= Azerbaijan at the Olympics =

- IOC code: AZE
- NOC: National Olympic Committee of the Republic of Azerbaijan
- Website: www.olympic.az (in Azerbaijani and English)
- Medals Ranked 61st: Gold 9 Silver 16 Bronze 31 Total 56

Summer appearances
- 1996; 2000; 2004; 2008; 2012; 2016; 2020; 2024; 2028

Winter appearances
- 1998; 2002; 2006; 2010; 2014; 2018; 2022; 2026

Other related appearances
- Russian Empire (1900–1912); Soviet Union (1952–1988); Unified Team (1992)

Azerbaijan first participated at the Olympic Games as an independent nation in 1996, and has sent athletes to compete in every Games since then. Previously, Azerbaijani athletes competed as part of the Soviet Union from 1952 to 1988, and after the dissolution of the Soviet Union, Azerbaijan was part of the Unified Team in 1992. Azerbaijani athletes have won a total of 56 medals at the Summer Olympic Games. The nation has not won any medals at the Winter Olympic Games. The National Olympic Committee of the Republic of Azerbaijan was created in 1992 and recognized by the International Olympic Committee in 1993.

In 2016, Azerbaijan became one of only two nations (the other being Great Britain, also between 2000 and 2016) ever to increase the number of medals achieved in five consecutive Games. Azerbaijan is particularly strong in combative sports, with 40 of their 45 medals being awarded in wrestling, boxing, judo and taekwondo.

== Medal tables ==
=== Medals by Summer Games ===
Games	Athletes	Gold	Silver	Bronze	Total	Rank
1900–1912	as part of the Russian Empire					
1920–1948	did not participate					
1952–1988	as part of the Soviet Union					
1992 Barcelona	as part of the Unified Team					
1996 Atlanta	23	0	1	0	1	61
2000 Sydney	31	2	0	1	3	34
2004 Athens	36	1	0	4	5	50
2008 Beijing	44	1	1	4	6	40
2012 London	53	2	2	5	9	32
2016 Rio de Janeiro	56	1	7	10	18	39
2020 Tokyo	44	0	3	4	7	67
2024 Paris	48	2	2	3	7	30
2028 Los Angeles	future event					
2032 Brisbane	future event					
Total		9	16	31	56	61

=== Medals by Winter Games ===
Games	Athletes	Gold	Silver	Bronze	Total	Rank
1956–1988	as part of the Soviet Union					
1992 Albertville	did not participate					
1994 Lillehammer	did not participate					
1998 Nagano	4	0	0	0	0	–
2002 Salt Lake City	4	0	0	0	0	–
2006 Turin	2	0	0	0	0	–
2010 Vancouver	2	0	0	0	0	–
2014 Sochi	4	0	0	0	0	–
2018 Pyeongchang	1	0	0	0	0	–
2022 Beijing	2	0	0	0	0	–
2026 Milano Cortina	2	0	0	0	0	–
2030 French Alps	future event					
2034 Utah	future event					
Total		0	0	0	0	–

=== Medals by summer sport ===
Sport	Gold	Silver	Bronze	Total
Wrestling	4	8	16	28
Judo	3	2	2	7
Taekwondo	1	1	2	4
Shooting	1	0	2	3
Boxing	0	2	8	10
Karate	0	2	0	2
Canoeing	0	1	1	2
Totals (7 entries)	9	16	31	56

== Medalists ==
Medal	Name	Games	Sport	Event
Silver	Namig Abdullayev	1996 Atlanta	Wrestling	Men's freestyle flyweight
Gold	Zemfira Meftahatdinova	2000 Sydney	Shooting	Women's skeet
Gold	Namig Abdullayev	2000 Sydney	Wrestling	Men's freestyle flyweight
Bronze	Vugar Alakbarov	2000 Sydney	Boxing	Men's middleweight
Gold	Farid Mansurov	2004 Athens	Wrestling	Men's Greco-Roman lightweight
Bronze	Fuad Aslanov	2004 Athens	Boxing	Men's flyweight
Bronze	Aghasi Mammadov	2004 Athens	Boxing	Men's bantamweight
Bronze	Irada Ashumova	2004 Athens	Shooting	Women's 25 m pistol
Bronze	Zemfira Meftahatdinova	2004 Athens	Shooting	Women's skeet
Gold	Elnur Mammadli	2008 Beijing	Judo	Men's 73 kg
Silver	Rovshan Bayramov	2008 Beijing	Wrestling	Men's Greco-Roman 55 kg
Bronze	Shahin Imranov	2008 Beijing	Boxing	Men's featherweight
Bronze	Movlud Miraliyev	2008 Beijing	Judo	Men's 100 kg
Bronze	Mariya Stadnik	2008 Beijing	Wrestling	Women's freestyle 48 kg
Bronze	Khetag Gazyumov	2008 Beijing	Wrestling	Men's freestyle 96 kg
Gold	Toghrul Asgarov	2012 London	Wrestling	Men's freestyle 60 kg
Gold	Sharif Sharifov	2012 London	Wrestling	Men's freestyle 84 kg
Silver	Rovshan Bayramov	2012 London	Wrestling	Men's Greco-Roman 55 kg
Silver	Mariya Stadnik	2012 London	Wrestling	Women's freestyle 48 kg
Bronze	Teymur Mammadov	2012 London	Boxing	Men's heavyweight
Bronze	Magomedrasul Majidov	2012 London	Boxing	Men's super heavyweight
Bronze	Khetag Gazyumov	2012 London	Wrestling	Men's freestyle 96 kg
Bronze	Emin Ahmadov	2012 London	Wrestling	Men's Greco-Roman 74 kg
Bronze	Yuliya Ratkevich	2012 London	Wrestling	Women's freestyle 55 kg
Gold	Radik Isayev	2016 Rio de Janeiro	Taekwondo	Men's +80 kg
Silver	Lorenzo Sotomayor	2016 Rio de Janeiro	Boxing	Men's light welterweight
Silver	Valentin Demyanenko	2016 Rio de Janeiro	Canoeing	Men's C-1 200 metres
Silver	Rustam Orujov	2016 Rio de Janeiro	Judo	Men's 73 kg
Silver	Elmar Gasimov	2016 Rio de Janeiro	Judo	Men's 100 kg
Silver	Toghrul Asgarov	2016 Rio de Janeiro	Wrestling	Men's freestyle 65 kg
Silver	Khetag Gazyumov	2016 Rio de Janeiro	Wrestling	Men's freestyle 97 kg
Silver	Mariya Stadnik	2016 Rio de Janeiro	Wrestling	Women's freestyle 48 kg
Bronze	Kamran Shakhsuvarly	2016 Rio de Janeiro	Boxing	Men's middleweight
Bronze	Inna Osypenko-Radomska	2016 Rio de Janeiro	Canoeing	Women's K-1 200 metres
Bronze	Milad Beigi	2016 Rio de Janeiro	Taekwondo	Men's 80 kg
Bronze	Patimat Abakarova	2016 Rio de Janeiro	Taekwondo	Women's 49 kg
Bronze	Haji Aliyev	2016 Rio de Janeiro	Wrestling	Men's freestyle 57 kg
Bronze	Jabrayil Hasanov	2016 Rio de Janeiro	Wrestling	Men's freestyle 74 kg
Bronze	Sharif Sharifov	2016 Rio de Janeiro	Wrestling	Men's freestyle 86 kg
Bronze	Rasul Chunayev	2016 Rio de Janeiro	Wrestling	Men's Greco-Roman 66 kg
Bronze	Sabah Shariati	2016 Rio de Janeiro	Wrestling	Men's Greco-Roman 130 kg
Bronze	Nataliya Synyshyn	2016 Rio de Janeiro	Wrestling	Women's freestyle 53 kg
Silver	Rafael Aghayev	2020 Tokyo	Karate	Men's 75 kg
Silver	Haji Aliyev	2020 Tokyo	Wrestling	Men's freestyle 65 kg
Silver	Irina Zaretska	2020 Tokyo	Karate	Women's +61 kg
Bronze	Iryna Kindzerska	2020 Tokyo	Judo	Women's +78 kg
Bronze	Loren Alfonso	2020 Tokyo	Boxing	Men's light heavyweight
Bronze	Rafig Huseynov	2020 Tokyo	Wrestling	Men's Greco-Roman 77 kg
Bronze	Mariya Stadnik	2020 Tokyo	Wrestling	Women's freestyle 50 kg
Gold	Hidayat Heydarov	2024 Paris	Judo	Men's 73 kg
Gold	Zelym Kotsoiev	2024 Paris	Judo	Men's 100 kg
Silver	Gashim Magomedov	2024 Paris	Taekwondo	Men's 58 kg
Silver	Loren Alfonso	2024 Paris	Boxing	Men's heavyweight
Bronze	Hasrat Jafarov	2024 Paris	Wrestling	Men's Greco-Roman 67 kg
Bronze	Giorgi Meshvildishvili	2024 Paris	Wrestling	Men's freestyle 125 kg
Bronze	Magomedkhan Magomedov	2024 Paris	Wrestling	Men's freestyle 97 kg

== Disqualified medalists ==
Medal	Name	Sport	Event	Date
Silver	Vitaliy Rahimov	Wrestling	Men's 60 kg	12 August 2008
Bronze	Valentin Hristov	Weightlifting	Men's 56 kg	29 July 2012

== Participants by sport ==
=== Summer Games ===
Sport		1996	2000	2004	2008	2012	Total
Athletics	Field events	2	3	3	2	2	18
Athletics	Track events	2	1	2	0	1	18
Boxing		2	5	9	2	8	26
Canoeing	Sprint	0	0	0	0	3	3
Cycling	Road	0	0	0	0	1	1
Diving	Platform	1	1	0	0	0	2
Equestrian	Show jumping	0	0	0	1	1	2
Fencing	Individual sabre	1	0	1	0	1	3
Gymnastics	Artistic	0	0	0	0	1	11
Gymnastics	Individual rhythmic	0	0	1	2	1	11
Gymnastics	Team rhythmic	0	0	0	0	6	11
Judo		2	4	3	6	8	23
Rowing	Single sculls	0	0	0	0	2	2
Shooting	Air & Sporting Pistol	1	1	1	0	1	8
Shooting	Skeet	1	1	1	1	0	8
Swimming	Breaststroke	0	0	1	1	1	9
Swimming	Butterfly	0	0	0	0	1	9
Swimming	Freestyle	1	2	1	1	0	9
Taekwondo		0	0	2	1	2	5
Weightlifting		2	2	5	5	6	20
Wrestling	Græco-Roman	2	2	3	6	5	53
Wrestling	Freestyle	6	7	4	10	8	53
Total		23	31	36	44	53	187

=== Winter Games ===
Sport		1998	2002	2006	2010	Total
Alpine skiing	Slalom	0	1	0	2	3
Figure skating	Singles	2	1	0	0	9
Figure skating	Pairs	2	2	2	0	9
Total		4	4	2	2	12

== Flagbearers ==
Summer Olympics
Games	Athlete	Sport
1996 Atlanta	Nazim Hüseynov	Judo
2000 Sydney	Namig Abdullayev	Freestyle wrestling
2004 Athens	Nizami Pashayev	Weightlifting
2008 Beijing	Farid Mansurov	Greco-Roman wrestling
2012 London	Elnur Mammadli	Judo
2016 Rio de Janeiro	Teymur Mammadov	Boxing
2020 Tokyo	Rustam Orujov & Farida Azizova	Judo (Orujov) & taekwando (Azizova)

Winter Olympics
Games	Athlete	Sport
1998 Nagano	Julia Vorobieva	Figure skating
2002 Salt Lake City	Sergey Rylov	Figure skating
2006 Turin	Mikhail Rakimov	Official
2010 Vancouver	Fuad Guliyev	Official
2014 Sochi	Rahman Khalilov	
2018 Pyeongchang	Patrick Brachner	Alpine skiing

== See also ==
- National Olympic Committee of Azerbaijan
- Olympic competitors for Azerbaijan
- Azerbaijan at the Paralympics
- List of Azerbaijani Olympic medalists
- List of flag bearers for Azerbaijan at the Olympics
