= Franklin Gómez =

Puerto Rican wrestler (born 1986)

Personal information
- Full name: Franklin Gómez Matos
- Nationality: Puerto Rico
- Born: August 5, 1986 (age 40) Puerto Plata, Dominican Republic
- Height: 168 cm (5 ft 6 in)
- Weight: 74 kg (163 lb)

Sport
- Sport: Wrestling
- Events: Freestyle and Folkstyle
- College team: Michigan State
- Club: Nittany Lion Wrestling Club
Medal record
Men's freestyle wrestling
Representing Puerto Rico
World Championships
Silver medal – second place	2011 Istanbul	60 kg
Pan American Games
Gold medal – first place	2011 Guadalajara	60 kg
Silver medal – second place	2019 Lima	74 kg
Bronze medal – third place	2015 Toronto	65 kg
Pan American Championships
Gold medal – first place	2011 Rionegro	60 kg
Silver medal – second place	2017 Lauro de Freitas	65 kg
Silver medal – second place	2020 Ottawa	74 kg
Bronze medal – third place	2019 Buenos Aires	74 kg
Central American and Caribbean Games
Gold medal – first place	2014 Veracruz	65 kg
Bronze medal – third place	2010 Mayagüez	60 kg
Dan Kolov – Nikola Petrov Grand Prix
Gold medal – first place	2016 Sofia	65 kg
Gold medal – first place	2014 Sofia	65 kg
Men's collegiate wrestling
Representing the Michigan State Spartans
NCAA Division I Championships
Gold medal – first place	2009 St. Louis	133 lb
Bronze medal – third place	2008 St. Louis	133 lb
Bronze medal – third place	2010 Omaha	133 lb
Big Ten Championships
Gold medal – first place	2008 Minneapolis	133 lb
Gold medal – first place	2009 University Park	133 lb
Bronze medal – third place	2010 Ann Arbor	133 lb

Franklin Gómez Matos (born August 5, 1986) is a Dominican-born Puerto Rican freestyle wrestler.

== Early years and education ==
Gómez was born in Puerto Plata Province in the Dominican Republic. His father, Eugenio Gómez, was a fisherman and his mother, Margarita Matos, was a housewife. In 1991, Franklin's father died as a consequence of medical malpractice. As a result, his mother decided to move to Puerto Rico, along with Franklin and her other two sons: Emanuel and Abel. During childhood, Gómez played basketball and baseball. He began wrestling when he was 12 years old, training at Club Sparta in San Juan.

He came to the United States and lived in New Jersey his freshman year of high school where he stayed with a host family, Bill and Diane McGrath, and attended St. Augustine Preparatory School in Richland, New Jersey. Gómez would then move to Brandon, Florida, where he attended Brandon High School.

Aside of wrestling, Gómez completed a Bachelor's degree in Human Resources, with a major in psychology from Michigan State, as well as a Master's degree in Business Administration from Walden University.

== Wrestling career ==
=== High school ===
While studying at St. Augustine Prep in New Jersey, Gómez won district and regional titles at 103 and 112-pounds. He then wrestled at Brandon High School in Brandon, Florida, and was the 2005 FHSAA 2A 119-pound state champion his senior year. Gómez also completed the triple crown of high school wrestling in 2005, winning a folkstyle national championship, along with the junior freestyle and junior Greco-Roman national championships.

=== College ===
Following high school, Gómez wrestled collegiately for Michigan State, where he won an NCAA Division I title at 133-pounds in 2009. After graduation, he was recruited to the Nittany Lion Wrestling Club at Penn State University, where he trained in freestyle wrestling.

=== Senior level ===
During the 2011 Pan American Games in Guadalajara, Mexico, Gómez won the first gold medal in the sport of wrestling for Puerto Rico. He would win his next three tournaments in Romania, Italy and Germany. In his last performance, he defeated the current world champion in the 60 kg, the Russian wrestler Besik Kudukhov, claiming the gold medal in the Grand Prix of Germany. After becoming the sub-champion and winning a silver medal in the 2011 World Championships, Gomez also won his country a spot at the 2012 London Olympics.

At the 2012 Olympics in London, Gómez faced Besik Kudukhov of Russia again but this time in the first round. Kudukhov defeated Gomez 3–1 and made the final but was defeated by Toghrul Asgarov of Azerbaijan. With Kudukhov making the final, Gomez was made eligible to wrestle for a medal in the repechage rounds. Gómez fought against Yogeshwar Dutt in the repechage rounds, but lost again 0–3, and Dutt eventually claimed the bronze medal.

At the 2014 World Wrestling Championships in the round of 16 he lost to Soslan Ramonov (by fall) of Russia and in the repechage round 2 he lost again to Ganzorigiin Mandakhnaran of Mongolia (4–7). In the match against Soslan Ramonov he wrestled with extreme, violent energy, intense determination, competed on equal terms with the eventual world champion, leading on points 10-8 before his losing.

At the 2016 Dan Kolov – Nikola Petrov Tournament Gómez held the gold medal after defeating the strong international wrestler Borislav Novachkov of Bulgaria.

At the 2016 Olympics in Rio de Janeiro, Brazil, Gómez faced Ikhtiyor Navruzov of Uzbekistan. Gómez and Navruzov were tied 5–5 in the second round. As the match was about to end, Gómez made a move that took Navruzov outside of the ring, initially warranting two points for Gómez. However, one of the officers argued that the move favored Navruzov, forcing Gómez' corner to challenge the call. When the officers decided against him, the bout ended 8–5 against Gómez.

The decision was controversial from the beginning, with various experts and sources calling the decision "insane", and saying that Gómez was "robbed" on Twitter. Some notable wrestlers and coaches that tweeted in support of Gómez were Eric Thompson, Jake Varner, Cael Sanderson, Mark Hemauer, and Ben Askren. Former Governor of Puerto Rico Aníbal Acevedo Vilá tweeted using the hashtag "#GomezGotRobbed". Meanwhile, current Governor Alejandro García Padilla vowed to protest what he called a "theft" to the sport.

Shortly after the match, the three officers in charge of the match were suspended by United World Wrestling because of "suspicious officiating". They also claimed that an investigation would be done, but their decision couldn't be overturned. On September 3, 2016, it was announced that the three officers were officially expelled from the UWW, without offering the reasons for the expulsion.

Gómez was inducted into the Michigan State University Athletic Hall of Fame in 2021, and the Florida Wrestling Hall of Fame in 2023.

== Achievements ==
- NCAA Division I champion at 133 pounds (2009)
- Athlete of the Year at Michigan State University (2009)
- Two-time Big Ten Conference champion (2008, 2009)
- Silver medal at the 2011 World Wrestling Championships in Istanbul, Turkey (2011)
- Gold medal at the 2011 Pan American Games in Guadalajara, Mexico (2011)
- Gold medal at the 2014 Central American and Caribbean Games in Veracruz, Mexico (2014)

== Freestyle record ==
Senior Freestyle Matches
Res.	Record	Opponent	Score	Date	Event	Location
2017 Clubs World Cup (silver) for Team USA at 70 kg
Loss	114–46	(Iran) Mohammad naderi	2–2	December 7–8, 2017	2017 Clubs World Cup	Tehran, Iran
Win	114–45	(Mongolia) Lutbayar Batbayar	5–3	December 7–8, 2017	2017 Clubs World Cup	Tehran, Iran
Win	113–45	(Bulgaria) Miroslav Hristov	13–4	December 7–8, 2017	2017 Clubs World Cup	Tehran, Iran
Loss	112–45	(India) Vinod Kumar	5–6	December 7–8, 2017	2017 Clubs World Cup	Tehran, Iran
Win	112–44	(Canada) FF	FF	December 7–8, 2017	2017 Clubs World Cup	Tehran, Iran
2017 World Championships 8th at 65 kg
Loss	111–44	(Cuba) Alejandro Valdés	2–11	August 6, 2017	2017 World Championships	Paris, France
Win	111–43	(Ukraine) Gor Ogannesyan	3–1	August 6, 2017	2017 World Championships	Paris, France
Win	110–43	(Peru) Sixto Auccapiña	8–0	August 6, 2017	2017 World Championships	Paris, France
2017 Pan American Championships (silver) at 65 kg
Win	109–43	(Colombia) Andres Castañeda	8–5	May 5–7, 2017	2017 Pan American Continental Championships	Lauro de Freitas, Brazil
Win	108–43	(Venezuela) Wilfredo Rodríguez	TF 13–2	May 5–7, 2017	2017 Pan American Continental Championships	Lauro de Freitas, Brazil
2016 Summer Olympics 9th at 65 kg
Loss	107–43	(Uzbekistan) Ikhtiyor Navruzov	5–8	August 21, 2016	2016 Summer Olympics	Rio de Janeiro, Brazil
Win	107–42	(Bulgaria) Borislav Novachkov	7–4	August 21, 2016	2016 Summer Olympics	Rio de Janeiro, Brazil
2016 Grand Prix of Spain (silver) at 65 kg
Loss	106–42	(Mongolia) Ganzorigiin Mandakhnaran	1–5	July 9–10, 2016	2016 Grand Prix of Spain	Madrid, Spain
Win	106–41	(Russia) Ivan Filippov	2–0	July 9–10, 2016	2016 Grand Prix of Spain	Madrid, Spain
Win	105–41	(Kazakhstan) Ilyas Zhumay	TF 10–0	July 9–10, 2016	2016 Grand Prix of Spain	Madrid, Spain
Win	104–41	(Germany) Kevin Henkel	8–6	July 9–10, 2016	2016 Grand Prix of Spain	Madrid, Spain
2016 Granma y Cerro Pelado International (gold) at 65 kg
Win	103–41	(Cuba) Yowlys Bonne		June 10–14, 2016	2016 Granma y Cerro Pelado International	Havana, Cuba
Win	102–41	(Cuba) Alejandro Valdés		June 10–14, 2016	2016 Granma y Cerro Pelado International	Havana, Cuba
2016 Pan American Olympic Qualification Tournament (silver) at 65 kg
Loss	101–41	(Cuba) Alejandro Valdés	3–8	March 5, 2016	2016 Pan American Olympic Qualification Tournament	(United States) Frisco, Texas
Win	101–40	(Colombia) Hernán Guzmán	8–4	March 5, 2016	2016 Pan American Olympic Qualification Tournament	(United States) Frisco, Texas
Win	100–40	(United States) Brent Metcalf	9–7	March 5, 2016	2016 Pan American Olympic Qualification Tournament	(United States) Frisco, Texas
2016 Yasar Dogu 7th at 65 kg
Loss	99–40	(Azerbaijan) Haji Aliyev	2–3	February 5–7, 2016	2016 Yasar Dogu International	Istanbul, Turkey
Win	99–39	(Turkey) Omer Uzan	TF 12–0	February 5–7, 2016	2016 Yasar Dogu International	Istanbul, Turkey
2016 Dan Kolov – Nikola Petrov Tournament (gold) at 65 kg
Win	98–39	(Bulgaria) Borislav Novachkov	4–0	January 29–31, 2016	2016 Dan Kolov – Nikola Petrov International	Sofia, Bulgaria
Win	97–39	(Iran) Mahdi Niazijengheshlaghi'nin	TF 10–0	January 29–31, 2016	2016 Dan Kolov – Nikola Petrov International	Sofia, Bulgaria
Win	96–39	(Bulgaria) Filip Novachkov	7–1	January 29–31, 2016	2016 Dan Kolov – Nikola Petrov International	Sofia, Bulgaria
2015 World Championships 28th at 65 kg
Loss	95–39	(Armenia) David Safaryan	4–6	September 10, 2015	[2015 World Championships	(United States) Las Vegas, Nevada
2015 Pan American Games (bronze) at 65 kg
Win	95–38	(Guatemala) Marbin Miranda	TF 10–0	July 17, 2015	2015 Pan American Games	Toronto, Canada
Loss	94–38	(United States) Brent Metcalf	8–10	July 17, 2015	2015 Pan American Games	Toronto, Canada
Win	94–37	(Venezuela) Wilfredo Henriquez	TF 10–0	July 17, 2015	2015 Pan American Games	Toronto, Canada
2014 Central American and Caribbean Games (gold) at 65 kg
Win	93–37	(Cuba) Alejandro Valdés	TF 14–3	October 20–24, 2014	2014 Central American and Caribbean Games	Veracruz, Mexico
Win	92–37	(El Salvador) Luis Portillo	TF 10–0	October 20–24, 2014	2014 Central American and Caribbean Games	Veracruz, Mexico
Win	91–37	(Venezuela) Elvis Fuentes	TF 11–0	October 20–24, 2014	2014 Central American and Caribbean Games	Veracruz, Mexico
2014 World Championships 8th at 65 kg
Loss	90–37	(Mongolia) Ganzorigiin Mandakhnaran	4–7	September 9, 2014	2014 World Championships	Tashkent, Uzbekistan
Win	90–36	(France) Christophe Clavier	TF 13–0	September 9, 2014	2014 World Championships	Tashkent, Uzbekistan
Loss	89–36	(Russia) Soslan Ramonov	Fall	September 9, 2014	2014 World Championships	Tashkent, Uzbekistan
Win	89–35	(Kyrgyzstan) Sayatbek Okassov	5–1	September 9, 2014	2014 World Championships	Tashkent, Uzbekistan
2014 Olympia (silver) at 65 kg
Loss	88–35	(Russia) Akhmed Chakaev	7–10	July 19–20, 2014	2014 Olympia Tournament	Olympia, Greece
Win	88–34	(Georgia (country)) Zurabi Iakobishvili	4–2	July 19–20, 2014	2014 Olympia Tournament	Olympia, Greece
Win	87–34	(Cyprus) Stelios Mama	TF 10–0	July 19–20, 2014	2014 Olympia Tournament	Olympia, Greece
2014 Central American and Caribbean Championships (gold) at 65 kg
Win	86–34	(Colombia) Hernán Darío Guzmán Ipuz		April 2–7, 2014	2014 Central American and Caribbean Championships	San Juan, Puerto Rico
Win	85–34	(Cuba) Dayron Lazaro	TF	April 2–7, 2014	2014 Central American and Caribbean Championships	San Juan, Puerto Rico
Win	84–34	(Mexico) Brandon Díaz		April 2–7, 2014	2014 Central American and Caribbean Championships	San Juan, Puerto Rico
2014 Dan Kolov – Nikola Petrov Tournament (gold) at 65 kg
Win	83–34	(China) Yiriken Ailixiati	Fall	February 21–23, 2014	2014 Dan Kolov – Nikola Petrov International	Sofia, Bulgaria
Win	82–34	(Turkey) Selahattin Kılıçsallayan	TF 12–0	February 21–23, 2014	2014 Dan Kolov – Nikola Petrov International	Sofia, Bulgaria
Win	81–34	(Romania) George Bucur	TF 12–2	February 21–23, 2014	2014 Dan Kolov – Nikola Petrov International	Sofia, Bulgaria
Win	80–34	(Poland) Rafal Statkiewicz	Fall	February 21–23, 2014	2014 Dan Kolov – Nikola Petrov International	Sofia, Bulgaria
2014 Dave Schultz Memorial International (silver) at 65 kg
Loss	79–34	(United States) Frank Molinaro	1–1	January 30 – February 1, 2014	2014 Dave Schultz Memorial International Open	(United States) Colorado Springs, Colorado
Win	79–33	(Bulgaria) Borislav Novachkov	8–2	January 30 – February 1, 2014	2014 Dave Schultz Memorial International Open	(United States) Colorado Springs, Colorado
Win	78–33	(United States) Drew Headlee	TF 14–3	January 30 – February 1, 2014	2014 Dave Schultz Memorial International Open	(United States) Colorado Springs, Colorado
Win	77–33	(United States) Brett Robbins	TF 14–4	January 30 – February 1, 2014	2014 Dave Schultz Memorial International Open	(United States) Colorado Springs, Colorado
2013 World Championships 7th at 60 kg
Loss	76–33	(Armenia) Artur Arakelyan	4–6	September 17, 2013	2013 World Championships	Budapest, Hungary
Win	76–32	(Moldova) Andrei Prepeliţă	5–1	September 17, 2013	2013 World Championships	Budapest, Hungary
Loss	75–32	(Russia) Bekkhan Goygereyev	5–13	September 17, 2013	2013 World Championships	Budapest, Hungary
Win	75–31	(North Korea) Hwang Ryon-ghak	8–6	September 17, 2013	2013 World Championships	Budapest, Hungary
Win	74–31	(Kyrgyzstan) Bazar Bazarguruev	Fall	September 17, 2013	2013 World Championships	Budapest, Hungary
2013 Poland Open (gold) at 60 kg
Win	73–31	(Poland) Krzysztof Bienkowski	8–0	August 10, 2013	2013 Poland Open	Spala, Poland
2013 Grand Prix of Spain (gold) at 60 kg
Win	72–31	(Slovakia) Nikolai Bolotnyuk	5–0	July 13, 2013	2013 Grand Prix of Spain	Madrid, Spain
Win	71–31			July 13, 2013	2013 Grand Prix of Spain	Madrid, Spain
Win	70–31			July 13, 2013	2013 Grand Prix of Spain	Madrid, Spain
2013 FILA Golden Grand Prix (silver) at 60 kg
Loss	69–31	(Georgia (country)) Vladimer Khinchegashvili		May 31, 2013	2013 FILA Golden Grand Prix	Sassari, Italy
2013 Ivan Yarygin Golden Grand Prix 19th at 60 kg
Loss	69–30	(Sakha Republic) Vladimir Flegontov	2–4, 1–0, 1–2	January 24, 2013	2013 Ivan Yarygin Golden Grand Prix	Krasnoyarsk, Russia
2012 Summer Olympics 15th at 60 kg
Loss	69–29	(India) Yogeshwar Dutt	0–1, 0–1	August 11, 2012	2012 Summer Olympics	(United Kingdom) London, England
Loss	69–28	(Russia) Besik Kudukhov	2–2, 0–1, 0–1	August 11, 2012	2012 Summer Olympics	(United Kingdom) London, England
2012 Germany Grand Prix (gold) at 60 kg
Win	69–27	(Russia) Besik Kudukhov		June 30, 2012	2012 Grand Prix of Germany	Dortmund, Germany
2012 Torneo Citta a Sassari (gold) at 60 kg
Win	69–27	(Italy) Salvatore Mannino		June 2, 2012	2012 Torneo Citta a Sassari	Sassari, Italy
2012 Ion Corneanu Memorial (gold) at 60 kg
Win	68–27	(Romania) Andrei Dukov		May 25, 2012	2012 Ion Corneanu Memorial	Targoviste, Romania
2011 Pan American Games (gold) at 60 kg
Win	67–27	(Mexico) Guillermo Torres	3–0, 6–0	October 20–24, 2011	2011 Pan American Games	Guadalajara, Mexico
Win	66–27	(Cuba) Yowlys Bonne	2–0, 3–0	October 20–24, 2011	2011 Pan American Games	Guadalajara, Mexico
Win	65–27	(Dominican Republic) Gabriel García	4–0, 4–0	October 20–24, 2011	2011 Pan American Games	Guadalajara, Mexico
2011 World Championships (silver) at 60 kg
Loss	64–27	(Russia) Besik Kudukhov	0–5, 0–1	September 17, 2011	2011 World Championships	Istanbul, Turkey
Win	63–26	(Kazakhstan) Dauren Zhumagaziyev	1–1, 0–1, 3–0	September 17, 2011	2011 World Championships	Istanbul, Turkey
Win	62–26	(Azerbaijan) Zelimkhan Huseynov	0–1, 1–0, 2–1	September 17, 2011	2011 World Championships	Istanbul, Turkey
Win	61–26	(South Korea) Lee Seung-chul	2–0, 3–0	September 17, 2011	2011 World Championships	Istanbul, Turkey
Win	60–26	(North Korea) Ri Jong-myong	1–0, 3–0	September 17, 2011	2011 World Championships	Istanbul, Turkey
Win	59–26	(Georgia (country)) Malkhaz Zarkua	4–0, 2–0	September 17, 2011	2011 World Championships	Istanbul, Turkey
2011 Spain Grand Prix (gold) at 60 kg
Win	58–26	(Germany) Tim Schleicher		July 7, 2011	2011 Grand Prix of Spain	Madrid, Spain
2011 Pan American Championships (gold) at 60 kg
Win	57–26	(Canada) Ryley Walker		May 6, 2011	2011 Pan American Continental Championships	Rionegro, Colombia
Win	56–26	(United States) Derek Moore	2–0, 5–0	March 17, 2011	2011 NCAA vs. USAW National Team All-Star Dual	(United States) Philadelphia, Pennsylvania
2011 Dave Schultz Memorial International (bronze) at 60 kg
Win	55–26	(United States) Nick Simmons	2–1, 1–0	February 2–5, 2011	2011 Dave Schultz Memorial International Open	(United States) Colorado Springs, Colorado
Win	54–26	(United States) Reece Humphrey	7–0, 0–1, 3–0	February 2–5, 2011	2011 Dave Schultz Memorial International Open	(United States) Colorado Springs, Colorado
Win	53–26	(United States) Coleman Scott	1–0, 1–1	February 2–5, 2011	2011 Dave Schultz Memorial International Open	(United States) Colorado Springs, Colorado
Win	52–26	(United States) Nick Fanthorpe	3–0, 1–0	February 2–5, 2011	2011 Dave Schultz Memorial International Open	(United States) Colorado Springs, Colorado
Loss	51–26	(Japan) Shogo Maeda	6–0, 0–1, 1–4	February 2–5, 2011	2011 Dave Schultz Memorial International Open	(United States) Colorado Springs, Colorado
Win	51–25	(Mexico) Alan Olvera	TF 6–0, 6–0	February 2–5, 2011	2011 Dave Schultz Memorial International Open	(United States) Colorado Springs, Colorado
2010 NYAC International Open at 60 kg
Loss	50–25	(United States) Reece Humphrey	0–1, 0–1	November 20–21, 2010	2010 Sunkist Kids International Open	(United States) New York, New York
Loss	50–24	(Russia) Rasul Murtazaliev	3–5, 0–2	November 20–21, 2010	2010 Sunkist Kids International Open	(United States) New York, New York
Win	50–23	(United States) Derek Moore	1–1, 4–0	November 20–21, 2010	2010 Sunkist Kids International Open	(United States) New York, New York
Win	49–23	(Canada) James Mancini	Fall	November 20–21, 2010	2010 Sunkist Kids International Open	(United States) New York, New York
2010 Sunkist Kids International Open 5th at 60 kg
Win	48–23	(United States) Steve Mytych	1–0, 2–3, 1–0	October 22–24, 2010	2010 Sunkist Kids International Open	(United States) Tempe, Arizona
Loss	47–23	(Japan) Seshito Shimizu	Fall	October 22–24, 2010	2010 Sunkist Kids International Open	(United States) Tempe, Arizona
Win	47–22	(United States) Craig Barker	7–0, 4–0	October 22–24, 2010	2010 Sunkist Kids International Open	(United States) Tempe, Arizona
Win	46–22	(United States) Marcus Pettis	4–0, 7–0	October 22–24, 2010	2010 Sunkist Kids International Open	(United States) Tempe, Arizona
Loss	45–22	(United States) Drew Headlee	0–1, 0–1	October 22–24, 2010	2010 Sunkist Kids International Open	(United States) Tempe, Arizona
2010 World Championships 20th at 60 kg
Loss	45–21	(Georgia (country)) Malkhaz Kurdiani	2–2, 0–2	September 11, 2010	2010 World Championships	Moscow, Russia
2009 US Northeast Regionals (bronze) at 60 kg
Win	45–20	(United States) Daryl Thomas	Fall	May 15–16, 2009	2009 US Northeast Regional Championships	(United States) Waterloo, Iowa
Win	44–20	(United States) Nick Trizzino	3–0, 7–0	May 15–16, 2009	2009 US Northeast Regional Championships	(United States) Waterloo, Iowa
Loss	43–20	(United States) Daniel Dennis	0–1, 2–0, 0–1	May 15–16, 2009	2009 US Northeast Regional Championships	(United States) Waterloo, Iowa
Win	43–19	(United States) Daryl Thomas	8–1, 1–0	May 15–16, 2009	2009 US Northeast Regional Championships	(United States) Waterloo, Iowa
2009 US University Nationals (bronze) at 60 kg
Win	42–19	(United States) Dylan Long	7–0, 3–0	April 24–26, 2009	2009 US University National Championships	(United States) Akron, Ohio
Win	41–19	(United States) Daniel Mitcheff	1–1, 6–0	April 24–26, 2009	2009 US University National Championships	(United States) Akron, Ohio
Win	40–19	(United States) Conor Beebe	4–2, 4–2	April 24–26, 2009	2009 US University National Championships	(United States) Akron, Ohio
Win	39–19	(United States) Jimmy Conror	2–0, 3–0	April 24–26, 2009	2009 US University National Championships	(United States) Akron, Ohio
Win	38–19	(United States) Jayson Ness	5–1, 1–3, 2–1	April 24–26, 2009	2009 US University National Championships	(United States) Akron, Ohio
Win	37–19	(United States) Quinton Leith	TF 6–0, 7–0	April 24–26, 2009	2009 US University National Championships	(United States) Akron, Ohio
Loss	36–19	(United States) Coleman Scott	0–4, 1–2	April 24–26, 2009	2009 US University National Championships	(United States) Akron, Ohio
Win	36–18	(United States) Nikkien Fauntleroy	TF 7–1, 7–1	April 24–26, 2009	2009 US University National Championships	(United States) Akron, Ohio
Win	35–18	(United States) Brian Marcoux	TF 6–0, 6–0	April 24–26, 2009	2009 US University National Championships	(United States) Akron, Ohio
2009 US Nationals at 60 kg
Loss	34–18	(United States) Drew Headlee	0–1, 4–3, 0–4	April 9–11, 2009	2009 US National Championships	(United States) Las Vegas, Nevada
Win	34–17	(United States) Teague Moore	4–0, 0–1, 0–7	April 9–11, 2009	2009 US National Championships	(United States) Las Vegas, Nevada
Loss	33–17	(United States) Tyler Graff	0–3, 1–0, 0–1	April 9–11, 2009	2009 US National Championships	(United States) Las Vegas, Nevada
2008 US University World Team Trials (bronze) at 60 kg
Loss	33–16	(United States) Reece Humphrey	0–1, 0–1	May 24, 2008	2008 US University World Team Trials	(United States) Colorado
Win	33–15	(United States) Drew Headlee	3–0, 3–7, 2–0	May 24, 2008	2008 US University World Team Trials	(United States) Colorado
2008 US Northeast Regionals (silver) at 60 kg
Loss	32–15	(United States) Angel Cejudo	1–1, 1–1	May 10, 2008	2008 US Northeast Regional Championships	(United States) Iowa
Win	32–14	(United States) Jayson Ness	1–1, 0–4, 2–1	May 10, 2008	2008 US Northeast Regional Championships	(United States) Iowa
Win	31–14	(United States) Ben Hanisch	6–0, 3–0	May 10, 2008	2008 US Northeast Regional Championships	(United States) Iowa
2008 US Nationals 8th at 60 kg
Loss	30–14	(United States) Drew Headlee	2–3, 0–6	April 26, 2008	2008 US National Championships	(United States) Nevada
Loss	30–13	(United States) Dylan Long	4–0, 0–1, 0–7	April 26, 2008	2008 US National Championships	(United States) Nevada
Win	30–12	(United States) Alex Tsirtsis	1–1, 2–0, 1–0	April 26, 2008	2008 US National Championships	(United States) Nevada
Loss	29–12	(United States) Michael Lightner	0–3, 1–3	April 26, 2008	2008 US National Championships	(United States) Nevada
Win	29–11	(United States) Tyler Graff	6–0, 4–2	April 26, 2008	2008 US National Championships (qualifiers)	(United States) Nevada
Loss	28–11	(United States) Dylan Long	2–3, 0–2	April 26, 2008	2008 US National Championships (qualifiers)	(United States) Nevada
Win	28–10	(United States) Melvin Lofton	1–1, 2–0, 4–1	April 26, 2008	2008 US National Championships (qualifiers)	(United States) Nevada
Win	27–10	(United States) Drew Headlee	2–1, 1–0	April 26, 2008	2008 US National Championships (qualifiers)	(United States) Nevada
2008 US University Nationals (silver) at 60 kg
Loss	26–10	(United States) Daniel Dennis	0–3, 0–3	April 13, 2008	2008 US University National Championships	(United States) Ohio
Win	26–9	(United States) Alex Tsirtsis	4–1, 0–1, 3–1	April 13, 2008	2008 US University National Championships	(United States) Ohio
Win	25–9	(United States) Chris Jenkins	7–0, 1–0	April 13, 2008	2008 US University National Championships	(United States) Ohio
Win	24–9	(United States) Ben Hanisch	TF 6–0, 6–0	April 13, 2008	2008 US University National Championships	(United States) Ohio
Win	23–9	(United States) Dalton Bullard	1–0, 6–0	April 13, 2008	2008 US University National Championships	(United States) Ohio
Win	22–9	(United States) Matthew Fisk	7–0, 1–1	April 13, 2008	2008 US University National Championships	(United States) Ohio
2007 US World Team Trials at 60 kg
Loss	21–9	(United States) Josh Keefe	2–0, 2–3, 0–3	July 10, 2007	2007 US World Team Trials	(United States) Nevada
Loss	21–8	(United States) Shawn Bunch	0–1, 3–4	July 10, 2007	2007 US World Team Trials	(United States) Nevada
Win	21–7	(United States) Eric Metzler	4–0, 3–0	July 10, 2007	2007 US World Team Trials	(United States) Nevada
2007 US University Nationals 7th at 60 kg
Win	20–7	(United States) Mike Grey	7–3, 7–3	April 22, 2007	2007 US University National Championships	(United States) Ohio
Loss	19–7	(United States) Javier Maldonado	0–1, 2–3	April 22, 2007	2007 US University National Championships	(United States) Ohio
Win	19–6	(United States) Terry Williams	4–1, 1–1, 1–0	April 22, 2007	2007 US University National Championships	(United States) Ohio
Loss	18–6	(United States) Josh Keefe	0–5, 1–2	April 22, 2007	2007 US University National Championships	(United States) Ohio
Win	18–5	(United States) Brent Clausing	5–0, 4–0	April 22, 2007	2007 US University National Championships	(United States) Ohio
Win	17–5	(United States) Francisco Manriquez	2–0, 7–0	April 22, 2007	2007 US University National Championships	(United States) Ohio
Win	16–5	(United States) Evan Forde	TF 7–0, 7–0	April 22, 2007	2007 US University National Championships	(United States) Ohio
2007 US Nationals at 60 kg
Loss	15–5	(United States) Joey Rivera	1–3, 5–3, 2–5	April 7, 2007	2007 US National Championships	(United States) Nevada
Loss	15–4	(United States) Mike Zadick	TF 0–7, 0–7	April 7, 2007	2007 US National Championships	(United States) Nevada
Win	15–3	(United States) Travis Drake	1–1, 5–1	April 7, 2007	2007 US National Championships (qualifiers)	(United States) Nevada
Win	14–3	(United States) Bryan Osuna	3–0, 6–0	April 7, 2007	2007 US National Championships (qualifiers)	(United States) Nevada
Win	13–3	(United States) Josh Keefe	6–0, 1–4, 4–3	April 7, 2007	2007 US National Championships (qualifiers)	(United States) Nevada
Win	12–3	(United States) Angel Alegre	TF 8–0, 6–0	April 7, 2007	2007 US National Championships (qualifiers)	(United States) Nevada
Loss	11–3	(United States) Danny Felix	0–1, 0–1	April 7, 2007	2007 US National Championships (qualifiers)	(United States) Nevada
2007 US Northeast Regionals (gold) at 60 kg
Win	11–2	(United States) Danny Felix	1–0, 1–0	March 25, 2007	2007 US Northeast Regional Championships	(United States) New York
Win	10–2	(United States) Jason Guffey	TF 7–0, 6–0	March 25, 2007	2007 US Northeast Regional Championships	(United States) New York
Win	9–2	(United States) Michael Watts	TF 8–0, 7–0	March 25, 2007	2007 US Northeast Regional Championships	(United States) New York
Win	8–2	(United States) Rob Labrake	4–2, 7–0	March 25, 2007	2007 US Northeast Regional Championships	(United States) New York
2006 US World Team Trials at 55 kg
Loss	7–2	(United States) Matt Azevedo	1–8, 0–2	May 28, 2006	2006 US World Team Trials	(United States) Iowa
Win	7–1	(United States) Adam Smith	Fall	May 28, 2006	2006 US World Team Trials	(United States) Iowa
Win	6–1	(United States) Michael Martinez	1–0, 3–5, 2–2	May 28, 2006	2006 US World Team Trials	(United States) Iowa
Loss	5–1	(United States) Henry Cejudo	1–0, 1–2, 1–3	May 28, 2006	2006 US World Team Trials	(United States) Iowa
Win	5–0	(United States) Luke Smith	4–2, 7–0	May 28, 2006	2006 US World Team Trials	(United States) Iowa
2006 US University Nationals (gold) at 55 kg
Win	4–0	(United States) Luke Smith	3–0, 3–0	April 30, 2006	2006 US University National Championships	(United States) Illinois
Win	3–0	(United States) Brad Pataky	3–0, 5–0	April 30, 2006	2006 US University National Championships	(United States) Illinois
Win	2–0	(United States) Tim Kephart	3–0, 6–0	April 30, 2006	2006 US University National Championships	(United States) Illinois
Win	1–0	(United States) Chris Heilman	TF 6–0, 7–0	April 30, 2006	2006 US University National Championships	(United States) Illinois
