= List of Azerbaijani Olympic medalists =

== Modern Olympics ==
=== Summer Olympics ===
Medal	Name	Country	Games	Sport	Event	Ref
Bronze	Jafar Salmasi	Iran	1948 London	Weightlifting	Featherweight	
Silver	Gholamreza Takhti	Iran	1952 Helsinki	Wrestling	Men's freestyle Middleweight	
Silver	Rashid Mammadbeyov	Soviet Union	1952 Helsinki	Wrestling	Men's freestyle Bantamweight	
Bronze	Tofigh Jahanbakht	Iran	1952 Helsinki	Wrestling	Men's freestyle Lightweight	
Bronze	Mahmoud Mollaghasemi Tabrizi	Iran	1952 Helsinki	Wrestling	Men's freestyle Flyweight	
Gold	Gholamreza Takhti	Iran	1956 Melbourne	Wrestling	Men's freestyle Light heavyweight	
Silver	Mohammad Ali Khojastehpour	Iran	1956 Melbourne	Wrestling	Men's freestyle Flyweight	
Silver	Gholamreza Takhti	Iran	1960 Rome	Wrestling	Men's freestyle Light heavyweight	
Bronze	Mohammad Paziraei	Iran	1960 Rome	Wrestling	Men's Greco-Roman Flyweight	
Bronze	Aydin Ibrahimov	Soviet Union	1964 Tokyo	Wrestling	Men's freestyle Bantamweight	
Gold	Abdollah Movahed	Iran	1968 Mexico	Wrestling	Men's freestyle 70 kg	
Bronze	Aboutaleb Talebi	Iran	1968 Mexico	Wrestling	Men's freestyle 57 kg	
Silver	Rahim Aliabadi	Iran	1972 Munich	Wrestling	Men's Greco-Roman 48 kg	
Gold	Rafiga Shabanova	Soviet Union	1976 Montreal	Handball	Women's tournament	
Gold	Ilgar Mammadov	Soviet Union	1988 Seoul	Fencing	Men's team foil	
Gold	Kamandar Madzhidov	Soviet Union	1988 Seoul	Wrestling	Men's Greco-Roman 62 kg	
Bronze	Vugar Orujov	(International Olympic Committee) Unified Team	1992 Barcelona	Wrestling	Men's freestyle 48 kg	
Gold	Nazim Huseynov	(International Olympic Committee) Unified Team	1992 Barcelona	Judo	Men's 60 kg	
Bronze	Karina Aznavourian	Russia	1996 Atlanta	Fencing	Women's team épée	
Gold	Ilgar Mammadov	Russia	1996 Atlanta	Fencing	Men's team foil	
Silver	Malik Beyleroğlu	Turkey	1996 Atlanta	Boxing	Middleweight	
Silver	Namig Abdullayev	Azerbaijan	1996 Atlanta	Wrestling	Men's freestyle 52 kg	
Gold	Namig Abdullayev	Azerbaijan	2000 Sydney	Wrestling	Men's freestyle 54 kg	
Gold	Hossein Rezazadeh	Iran	2000 Sydney	Weightlifting	Men's +105 kg	
Gold	Karina Aznavourian	Russia	2000 Sydney	Fencing	Women's team épée	
Bronze	Vugar Alakbarov	Azerbaijan	2000 Sydney	Boxing	Middleweight	
Bronze	Hadi Saei	Iran	2000 Sydney	Taekwondo	Men's 68 kg	
Gold	Hadi Saei	Iran	2004 Athens	Taekwondo	Men's 68 kg	
Gold	Hossein Rezazadeh	Iran	2004 Athens	Weightlifting	Men's +105 kg	
Gold	Farid Mansurov	Azerbaijan	2004 Athens	Wrestling	Men's Greco-Roman 66 kg	
Silver	Tamilla Abassova	Russia	2004 Athens	Cycling	Women's sprint	
Gold	Karina Aznavourian	Russia	2004 Athens	Fencing	Women's team épée	
Bronze	Yousef Karami	Iran	2004 Athens	Taekwondo	Men's 80 kg	
Silver	Heydar Mammadaliyev	Russia	2004 Athens	Wrestling	Men's Greco-Roman 55 kg	
Bronze	Irada Ashumova	Azerbaijan	2004 Athens	Shooting	Women's 25 metre pistol	
Bronze	Aghasi Mammadov	Azerbaijan	2004 Athens	Boxing	Bantamweight	
Bronze	Fuad Aslanov	Azerbaijan	2004 Athens	Boxing	Flyweight	
Gold	Hadi Saei	Iran	2008 Beijing	Taekwondo	Men's 80 kg	
Bronze	Servet Tazegül	Turkey	2008 Beijing	Taekwondo	Men's 68 kg	
Gold	Elnur Mammadli	Azerbaijan	2008 Beijing	Judo	Men's 73 kg	
Bronze	Movlud Miraliyev	Azerbaijan	2008 Beijing	Judo	Men's 100 kg	
Silver	Rovshan Bayramov	Azerbaijan	2008 Beijing	Wrestling	Men's Greco-Roman 55 kg	
Bronze	Shahin Imranov	Azerbaijan	2008 Beijing	Boxing	Featherweight	
Gold	Toghrul Asgarov	Azerbaijan	2012 London	Wrestling	Men's freestyle 60 kg	
Silver	Sajjad Anoushiravani	Iran	2012 London	Weightlifting	Men's +105 kg	
Silver	Rovshan Bayramov	Azerbaijan	2012 London	Wrestling	Men's Greco-Roman 55 kg	
Bronze	Emin Ahmadov	Azerbaijan	2012 London	Wrestling	Men's Greco-Roman 74 kg	
Gold	Servet Tazegül	Turkey	2012 London	Taekwondo	Men's 68 kg	
Gold	Saeid Mohammadpour	Iran	2012 London	Weightlifting	Men's 94 kg	
Bronze	Teymur Mammadov	Azerbaijan	2012 London	Boxing	Men's heavyweight	
Silver	Rustam Orujov	Azerbaijan	2016 Rio	Judo	Men's 73 kg	
Silver	Elmar Gasimov	Azerbaijan	2016 Rio	Judo	Men's 100 kg	
Bronze	Kamran Shakhsuvarly	Azerbaijan	2016 Rio	Boxing	Men's middleweight	
Gold	Nijat Rahimov	Kazakhstan	2016 Rio	Weightlifting	Men's 77 kg	
Bronze	Kimia Alizadeh	Iran	2016 Rio	Taekwondo	Women's 57 kg	
Silver	Toghrul Asgarov	Azerbaijan	2016 Rio	Wrestling	Men's freestyle 65 kg	
Bronze	Haji Aliyev	Azerbaijan	2016 Rio	Wrestling	Men's freestyle 57 kg	
Gold	Sajjad Ganjzadeh	Iran	2020 Tokyo	Karate	Men's +75 kg	
Silver	Rafael Aghayev	Azerbaijan	2020 Tokyo	Karate	Kumite −75 kg	
Silver	Haji Aliyev	Azerbaijan	2020 Tokyo	Wrestling	65 kg	
Silver	Saeid Mollaei	Mongolia	2020 Tokyo	Judo	Men's 81 kg	
Bronze	Rafig Huseynov	Azerbaijan	2020 Tokyo	Wrestling	77 kg	
Bronze	Jessica Gadirova	United Kingdom	2020 Tokyo	Gymnastics	Women's artistic team all-around	
Silver	Parviz Nasibov	Ukraine	2020 Tokyo	Wrestling	Men's 67 kg |	
Bronze	Jennifer Gadirova	United Kingdom	2020 Tokyo	Gymnastics	Women's artistic team all-around	
Bronze	Mobina Nematzadeh	Iran	2024 Paris	Taekwondo	Women's 49 kg |	
Gold	Hidayat Heydarov	Azerbaijan	2024 Paris	Judo	Men's 73 kg |	
Silver	Parviz Nasibov	Ukraine	2024 Paris	Wrestling	Men's 67 kg |	
Bronze	Hasrat Jafarov	Azerbaijan	2024 Paris	Wrestling	Men's 67 kg |	
Bronze	Kimia Alizadeh	Bulgaria	2024 Paris	Taekwondo	Women's 57 kg	
Silver	Gashim Magomedov	Azerbaijan	2024 Paris	Taekwondo	Men's 58 kg	

==== By games ====
Games	Gold	Silver	Bronze	Total
1948 London	0	0	1	1
1952 Helsinki	0	2	0	2
1956 Melbourne	1	0	0	1
1960 Rome	0	1	1	2
1964 Tokyo	0	0	1	1
1968 Mexico	0	0	1	1
1972 Munich	0	1	0	1
1976 Montreal	1	0	0	1
1988 Seoul	2	0	0	2
1992 Barcelona	0	0	1	1
1996 Atlanta	1	2	1	4
2000 Sydney	3	0	2	5
2004 Athens	4	2	4	10
2008 Beijing	2	1	3	6
2012 London	3	2	2	7
2016 Rio	1	3	3	7
2020 Tokyo	0	2	2	4
2024 Paris	1	1	3	5
Totals (18 entries)	19	17	25	61

==== By sport ====
Sport	Gold	Silver	Bronze	Total
Wrestling	6	13	10	29
Weightlifting	4	1	1	6
Fencing	4	0	1	5
Judo	3	3	1	7
Taekwondo	3	0	6	9
Karate	1	1	0	2
Handball	1	0	0	1
Boxing	0	1	6	7
Cycling	0	1	0	1
Gymnastics	0	0	2	2
Shooting	0	0	1	1
Totals (11 entries)	22	20	28	70

==== By country ====
Country	Gold	Silver	Bronze	Total
Iran	8	5	9	22
Azerbaijan	5	8	12	25
Russia	3	2	1	6
Soviet Union	3	1	1	5
Turkey	1	1	1	3
(International Olympic Committee) Unified Team	1	0	1	2
Kazakhstan	1	0	0	1
Ukraine	0	2	0	2
Mongolia	0	1	0	1
United Kingdom	0	0	2	2
Bulgaria	0	0	1	1
Totals (11 entries)	22	20	28	70

== See also ==
- Azerbaijan at the Olympics
- Iran at the Olympics
