= 2014 World Wrestling Championships – Men's freestyle 65 kg =

Men's freestyle 65 kg at the 2014 World Championships
- Venue: Gymnastics Sport Palace
- Dates: 9 September 2014
- Competitors: 32 from 32 nations

Medalists
gold medal	Soslan Ramonov	Russia
silver medal	Ahmad Mohammadi	Iran
bronze medal	Ganzorigiin Mandakhnaran	Mongolia
bronze medal	Mihail Sava	Moldova

The men's freestyle 65 kilograms is a competition featured at the 2014 World Wrestling Championships, and was held in Tashkent, Uzbekistan on 9 September 2014.

This freestyle wrestling competition consisted of a single-elimination tournament, with a repechage used to determine the winners of two bronze medals.

Russia's Soslan Ramonov won the gold medal, Ahmad Mohammadi of Iran got the silver and Mongolia's Ganzorigiin Mandakhnaran and Moldova's Mihail Sava both received the bronze.

== Results ==
Legend

- C — Won by 3 cautions given to the opponent
- F — Won by fall

=== Final ===
Final
Soslan Ramonov (RUS)	7^{F}
Ahmad Mohammadi (IRI)	0

=== Top half ===
Round of 32
Tital Dzhafarian (UKR)	5
Ganzorigiin Mandakhnaran (MGL)	15
David Safaryan (ARM)	4
Haislan Garcia (CAN)	2
Franklin Gómez (PUR)	5
Sayatbek Okassov (KAZ)	1
Christophe Clavier (FRA)	0
Soslan Ramonov (RUS)	12
Amit Kumar Dhankar (IND)	4
Azamat Nurykau (BLR)	7
Batyr Borjakow (TKM)	0
Borislav Novachkov (BUL)	10
Luis Portillo (ESA)	0
Daichi Takatani (JPN)	8^{F}
Ikhtiyor Navruzov (UZB)	11
Martin Daum (GER)	3

Round of 16
Ganzorigiin Mandakhnaran (MGL)	12
David Safaryan (ARM)	1
Franklin Gómez (PUR)	10
Soslan Ramonov (RUS)	10^{F}
Azamat Nurykau (BLR)	4
Borislav Novachkov (BUL)	4
Daichi Takatani (JPN)	11
Ikhtiyor Navruzov (UZB)	6

Quarterfinals
Ganzorigiin Mandakhnaran (MGL)	0
Soslan Ramonov (RUS)	11
Azamat Nurykau (BLR)	6
Daichi Takatani (JPN)	2

Semifinals
Soslan Ramonov (RUS)	10
Azamat Nurykau (BLR)	0

=== Bottom half ===
Round of 32
Park Seong-un (KOR)	0
Brent Metcalf (USA)	11
Mustafa Kaya (TUR)	10
Kim Ju-song (PRK)	6
Magomed Muslimov (AZE)	10
Vilson Ndregjoni (ALB)	0
Bazar Bazarguruev (KGZ)	11
Mahatia Razafimahova (MAD)	0
Ling Haiwei (CHN)	2^{F}
Abdulrahman Ibrahim (QAT)	0
Mihail Sava (MDA)	6
Malkhaz Zarkua (GEO)	2
Dejan Mitrov (MKD)	2
George Bucur (ROU)	5
Maximilian Ausserleitner (AUT)	0
Ahmad Mohammadi (IRI)	10

Round of 16
Brent Metcalf (USA)	4
Mustafa Kaya (TUR)	7
Magomed Muslimov (AZE)	10
Bazar Bazarguruev (KGZ)	2
Ling Haiwei (CHN)	10
Mihail Sava (MDA)	9^{F}
George Bucur (ROU)	0
Ahmad Mohammadi (IRI)	7

Quarterfinals
Mustafa Kaya (TUR)	10
Magomed Muslimov (AZE)	0
Mihail Sava (MDA)	11
Ahmad Mohammadi (IRI)	14

Semifinals
Mustafa Kaya (TUR)	10
Ahmad Mohammadi (IRI)	17

=== Repechage ===
Repechage round 1
Christophe Clavier (FRA)	0
Franklin Gómez (PUR)	13
Maximilian Ausserleitner (AUT)	0
George Bucur (ROU)	10

Repechage round 2
Franklin Gómez (PUR)	4
Ganzorigiin Mandakhnaran (MGL)	7
George Bucur (ROU)	2
Mihail Sava (MDA)	8

Bronze medals
Ganzorigiin Mandakhnaran (MGL)	8^{C}
Azamat Nurykau (BLR)	7
Mihail Sava (MDA)	16
Mustafa Kaya (TUR)	13
