= 2015 World Wrestling Championships – Men's freestyle 65 kg =

Men's freestyle 65 kg at the 2015 World Championships
- Venue: Orleans Arena
- Dates: 10 September 2015
- Competitors: 47 from 47 nations

Medalists
gold medal	Frank Chamizo	Italy
silver medal	Ikhtiyor Navruzov	Uzbekistan
bronze medal	Soslan Ramonov	Russia
bronze medal	Ahmad Mohammadi	Iran

The men's freestyle 65 kilograms is a competition featured at the 2015 World Wrestling Championships, and was held in Las Vegas, United States on 10 September 2015.

== Results ==
Legend

- F — Won by fall
- WO — Won by walkover

=== Finals ===
Semifinals		Final
Soslan Ramonov (RUS)	2
Ikhtiyor Navruzov (UZB)	2^{F}	Ikhtiyor Navruzov (UZB)	3
Frank Chamizo (ITA)	2^{F}	Frank Chamizo (ITA)	4
Ahmad Mohammadi (IRI)	2

=== Top half ===
==== Section 1 ====
Round of 64

Round of 32
Mark Popov (ISR)	0
Soslan Ramonov (RUS)	10
Maximilian Ausserleitner (AUT)	1
Tomotsugu Ishida (JPN)	5
Borislav Novachkov (BUL)	7
Kim Jun-chui (KOR)	1
Steven Graf (SUI)	0
Aleksandr Kontoev (BLR)	9

Round of 16
Soslan Ramonov (RUS)	8
Tomotsugu Ishida (JPN)	0
Borislav Novachkov (BUL)	5
Aleksandr Kontoev (BLR)	0

Quarterfinals
Soslan Ramonov (RUS)	11
Borislav Novachkov (BUL)	7

==== Section 2 ====
Round of 64

Round of 32
Ikhtiyor Navruzov (UZB)	11
Jason Afrikaner (NAM)	0
Samet Dülger (GER)	6
Tital Dzhafarian (UKR)	7
Luis Portillo (ESA)	4
Wilfredo Henríquez (VEN)	10
Ganzorigiin Mandakhnaran (MGL)	9
Bebeto Yewah (CMR)	7

Round of 16
Ikhtiyor Navruzov (UZB)	9
Tital Dzhafarian (UKR)	0
Wilfredo Henríquez (VEN)	0
Ganzorigiin Mandakhnaran (MGL)	10

Quarterfinals
Ikhtiyor Navruzov (UZB)	11
Ganzorigiin Mandakhnaran (MGL)	1

=== Bottom half ===
==== Section 3 ====
Round of 64
Magomedmurad Gadzhiev (POL)	11
Mihail Sava (MDA)	0
Sodiqkhoja Ismoilov (TJK)	5
Vilson Ndregjoni (ALB)	0
Kim Ju-song (PRK)	12
Jarvis Tarkong (PLW)	0
Chamara Perera (SRI)	1
Nguyễn Xuân Định (VIE)	12
Avtandil Kentchadze (GEO)	WO
Ulukman Mamatov (KGZ)
Franklin Gómez (PUR)	4
David Safaryan (ARM)	6
Toghrul Asgarov (AZE)	7
Sayatbek Okassov (KAZ)	2

Round of 32
Frank Chamizo (ITA)	4
Magomedmurad Gadzhiev (POL)	3
Sodiqkhoja Ismoilov (TJK)	0
Kim Ju-song (PRK)	4
Nguyễn Xuân Định (VIE)	0
Avtandil Kentchadze (GEO)	10
David Safaryan (ARM)	2
Toghrul Asgarov (AZE)	8

Round of 16
Frank Chamizo (ITA)	5
Kim Ju-song (PRK)	2
Avtandil Kentchadze (GEO)	2
Toghrul Asgarov (AZE)	9

Quarterfinals
Frank Chamizo (ITA)	10
Toghrul Asgarov (AZE)	5

==== Section 4 ====
Round of 64
Yeerlanbieke Katai (CHN)	16
Mustafa Kaya (TUR)	6
Norbert Lukács (HUN)	0
Brent Metcalf (USA)	11
Franklin Marén (CUB)	10
Batyr Borjakow (TKM)	0
Ahmad Mohammadi (IRI)	12
David Habat (SLO)	0
Lowe Bingham (NRU)	0
Haislan Garcia (CAN)	10
Zaur Efendiev (SRB)	11
Brandon Díaz (MEX)	0
Terry van Rensburg (RSA)	0
George Bucur (ROU)	13
Waldeci Silva (BRA)	0
Hernán Guzmán (COL)	6^{F}

Round of 32
Yeerlanbieke Katai (CHN)	3
Brent Metcalf (USA)	5
Franklin Marén (CUB)	0
Ahmad Mohammadi (IRI)	6
Haislan Garcia (CAN)	4
Zaur Efendiev (SRB)	0
George Bucur (ROU)	7
Hernán Guzmán (COL)	3

Round of 16
Brent Metcalf (USA)	4
Ahmad Mohammadi (IRI)	5
Haislan Garcia (CAN)	2
George Bucur (ROU)	3

Quarterfinals
Ahmad Mohammadi (IRI)	6
George Bucur (ROU)	1

=== Repechage ===
Repechage round 2
Jason Afrikaner (NAM)	0
Tital Dzhafarian (UKR)	8
Magomedmurad Gadzhiev (POL)	WO
Kim Ju-song (PRK)

Repechage round 3
Tital Dzhafarian (UKR)	12
Ganzorigiin Mandakhnaran (MGL)	13^{F}
Magomedmurad Gadzhiev (POL)	3
Toghrul Asgarov (AZE)	12

Bronze medals
Ganzorigiin Mandakhnaran (MGL)	1
Soslan Ramonov (RUS)	6
Toghrul Asgarov (AZE)	5
Ahmad Mohammadi (IRI)	15
