= Wrestling at the 2015 European Games – Men's freestyle 65 kg =

Men's freestyle 65 kg at the 2015 European Games
- Venue: Heydar Aliyev Arena
- Date: 17 June
- Competitors: 22 from 22 nations

Medalists
gold medal	Toghrul Asgarov	Azerbaijan
silver medal	Frank Chamizo	Italy
bronze medal	Mustafa Kaya	Turkey
bronze medal	Ilyas Bekbulatov	Russia

Men's freestyle 65 kg competition at the 2015 European Games in Baku, Azerbaijan, took place on 17 June at the Heydar Aliyev Arena.

== Schedule ==
All times are Azerbaijan Summer Time (UTC+05:00)

Date	Time	Event
Wednesday, 17 June 2015	10:00	Qualifications
Wednesday, 17 June 2015	11:00	1/8 finals
Wednesday, 17 June 2015	13:00	Quarterfinals
Wednesday, 17 June 2015	13:00	Semifinals
Wednesday, 17 June 2015	15:00	Repechage
Wednesday, 17 June 2015	19:00	Finals

== Results ==
Legend

- F — Won by fall

=== Final ===
Final
Frank Chamizo (ITA)	2
Toghrul Asgarov (AZE)	4^{F}

=== Top half ===
Qualifications

1/8 finals
Petteri Martikainen (FIN)	10
Yunier Castillo (ESP)	16
George Bucur (ROU)	12
Niko Arouzmanidis (GRE)	1
Arlind Curri (KOS)	1
Mustafa Kaya (TUR)	12
Frank Chamizo (ITA)	4
Avtandil Kentchadze (GEO)	4

Quarterfinals
Yunier Castillo (ESP)	0
George Bucur (ROU)	11
Mustafa Kaya (TUR)	7
Frank Chamizo (ITA)	10

Semifinals
George Bucur (ROU)	4
Frank Chamizo (ITA)	5

=== Bottom half ===
Qualifications
Mihai Sava (MDA)	3
Samet Dülger (GER)	3
Ilyas Bekbulatov (RUS)	7
Toghrul Asgarov (AZE)	8
Andriy Kvyatkovskyy (UKR)	2
Azamat Nurykau (BLR)	3
Maximilian Ausserleitner (AUT)	2
Mark Popov (ISR)	4
David Safaryan (ARM)	2
Dejan Mitrov (MKD)	2
Borislav Novachkov (BUL)	4
Norbert Lukács (HUN)	1

1/8 finals
Maxime Fiquet (FRA)	4
Steven Graf (SUI)	2
Mihai Sava (MDA)	0
Toghrul Asgarov (AZE)	10
Azamat Nurykau (BLR)	10
Mark Popov (ISR)	4
David Safaryan (ARM)	6
Borislav Novachkov (BUL)	8

Quarterfinals
Maxime Fiquet (FRA)	0
Toghrul Asgarov (AZE)	10
Azamat Nurykau (BLR)	4
Borislav Novachkov (BUL)	4

Semifinals
Toghrul Asgarov (AZE)	7
Azamat Nurykau (BLR)	2

=== Repechage ===
Repechage round 1
Ilyas Bekbulatov (RUS)	16
Mihai Sava (MDA)	6

Repechage round 2
Avtandil Kentchadze (GEO)	13
Mustafa Kaya (TUR)	14
Ilyas Bekbulatov (RUS)	12
Maxime Fiquet (FRA)	2

Bronze medal match
Mustafa Kaya (TUR)	10
George Bucur (ROU)	0
Ilyas Bekbulatov (RUS)	4
Azamat Nurykau (BLR)	1
