= Wrestling at the 2018 Asian Games – Men's freestyle 65 kg =

Men's freestyle 65 kg at the 2018 Asian Games
- Venue: Jakarta Convention Center
- Date: 19 August 2018
- Competitors: 21 from 21 nations

Medalists
gold medal	Bajrang Punia	India
silver medal	Daichi Takatani	Japan
bronze medal	Sirojiddin Khasanov	Uzbekistan
bronze medal	Sayatbek Okassov	Kazakhstan

The men's freestyle 65 kilograms wrestling competition at the 2018 Asian Games in Jakarta was held on 19 August 2018 at the Jakarta Convention Center Assembly Hall.

== Schedule ==
All times are Western Indonesia Time (UTC+07:00)

Date	Time	Event
Sunday, 19 August 2018	13:00	Qualifications
Sunday, 19 August 2018	13:00	1/8 finals
Sunday, 19 August 2018	13:00	Quarterfinals
Sunday, 19 August 2018	13:00	Semifinals
Sunday, 19 August 2018	13:00	Repechages
Sunday, 19 August 2018	20:00	Finals

== Results ==
Legend

- F — Won by fall

=== Main bracket ===
==== Final ====
Final
Bajrang Punia (IND)	11
Daichi Takatani (JPN)	8

==== Top half ====
Qualifications

1/8 finals
Bajrang Punia (IND)	13
Sirojiddin Khasanov (UZB)	3
Abdulqosim Fayziev (TJK)	12
Somsak Jindapan (THA)	2
Saroj Yadav (NEP)	0
Batchuluuny Batmagnai (MGL)	10
Kim Kuk-gwang (PRK)	10
Hussein Al-Azzani (YEM)	0

Quarterfinals
Bajrang Punia (IND)	12
Abdulqosim Fayziev (TJK)	2
Batchuluuny Batmagnai (MGL)	4
Kim Kuk-gwang (PRK)	3

Semifinals
Bajrang Punia (IND)	10
Batchuluuny Batmagnai (MGL)	0

==== Bottom half ====
Qualifications
Mudassar Hussain (PAK)	0
Daichi Takatani (JPN)	10
Nguyễn Xuân Định (VIE)	4
Lee Seung-chul (KOR)	10
Sayatbek Okassov (KAZ)	11
Mousa Jouda (PLE)	0
Mehran Nassiri (IRI)	7
Yeerlanbieke Katai (CHN)	8
Malik Jan Sadeed (AFG)	2
Alibek Osmonov (KGZ)	13

1/8 finals
Ardiansyah Darmansyah (INA)	1
Batyr Borjakow (TKM)	11
Chon Thoun (CAM)	0
Daichi Takatani (JPN)	6^{F}
Lee Seung-chul (KOR)	0
Sayatbek Okassov (KAZ)	9^{F}
Yeerlanbieke Katai (CHN)	13
Alibek Osmonov (KGZ)	4

Quarterfinals
Batyr Borjakow (TKM)	2
Daichi Takatani (JPN)	13
Sayatbek Okassov (KAZ)	9
Yeerlanbieke Katai (CHN)	5

Semifinals
Daichi Takatani (JPN)	4
Sayatbek Okassov (KAZ)	4

=== Repechage ===
Repechage round 1
Mudassar Hussain (PAK)	15
Chon Thoun (CAM)	5

Repechage round 2
Sirojiddin Khasanov (UZB)	10
Abdulqosim Fayziev (TJK)	0
Mudassar Hussain (PAK)	0
Batyr Borjakow (TKM)	11

Bronze medals
Sirojiddin Khasanov (UZB)	10
Batchuluuny Batmagnai (MGL)	6
Batyr Borjakow (TKM)	2
Sayatbek Okassov (KAZ)	5

== Final standing ==
Rank	Athlete
1st place, gold medalist(s)	Bajrang Punia (IND)
2nd place, silver medalist(s)	Daichi Takatani (JPN)
3rd place, bronze medalist(s)	Sirojiddin Khasanov (UZB)
3rd place, bronze medalist(s)	Sayatbek Okassov (KAZ)
5	Batchuluuny Batmagnai (MGL)
5	Batyr Borjakow (TKM)
7	Yeerlanbieke Katai (CHN)
8	Alibek Osmonov (KGZ)
9	Abdulqosim Fayziev (TJK)
10	Kim Kuk-gwang (PRK)
11	Mudassar Hussain (PAK)
12	Lee Seung-chul (KOR)
13	Mehran Nassiri (IRI)
14	Chon Thoun (CAM)
15	Nguyễn Xuân Định (VIE)
16	Somsak Jindapan (THA)
17	Malik Jan Sadeed (AFG)
18	Ardiansyah Darmansyah (INA)
19	Hussein Al-Azzani (YEM)
19	Saroj Yadav (NEP)
21	Mousa Jouda (PLE)
