= 2016 Dan Kolov & Nikola Petrov Tournament =

Dan Kolov & Nikola Petrov 2016
- Host city: Sofia, Bulgaria
- Dates: 29–31 January

Champions
- Freestyle: Poland
- Greco-Roman: Bulgaria
- Women: Bulgaria

The 54th Dan Kolov & Nikola Petrov Tournament was a sport wrestling event held in Sofia, Bulgaria between 29 and 31 January 2016.

This international tournament includes competition in both men's and women's freestyle wrestling and men's Greco-Roman wrestling. This tournament is held in honor of Dan Kolov who was the first European freestyle wrestling champion from Bulgaria and European and World Champion Nikola Petroff.

== Event videos ==
The event was aired freely on the Bulgarian Wrestling Federation Live YouTube channel.

Broadcast
29 January 2016-Qualification Mat A	29 January 2016-Qualification Mat B	29 January 2016-Qualification Mat C
29 January 2016-Finals Mat A	29 January 2016-Finals Mat B	
30 January 2016-Qualification Mat A	30 January 2016-Qualification Mat B	30 January 2016-Qualification Mat C
30 January 2016-Finals Mat A	30 January 2016-Finals Mat B	
31 January 2016-Qualification Mat A	31 January 2016-Qualification Mat B	31 January 2016-Qualification Mat C
31 January 2016-Finals Mat A	31 January 2016-Finals Mat B	

== Medal table ==
Rank	Nation	Gold	Silver	Bronze	Total
1	Bulgaria	8	10	12	30
2	Iran	3	2	5	10
3	Armenia	3	2	1	6
4	Ukraine	3	1	1	5
5	Poland	2	3	2	7
6	Moldova	2	2	1	5
7	China	1	0	0	1
7	Greece	1	0	0	1
7	Puerto Rico	1	0	0	1
10	Algeria	0	1	2	3
10	Egypt	0	1	2	3
12	Turkey	0	1	1	2
13	Argentina	0	1	0	1
14	Venezuela	0	0	3	3
15	Italy	0	0	2	2
15	Mongolia	0	0	2	2
17	Albania	0	0	1	1
17	Canada	0	0	1	1
17	Slovakia	0	0	1	1
17	Uzbekistan	0	0	1	1
Totals (20 entries)		24	24	38	86

== Medal overview ==
=== Men's freestyle ===
Event	Gold	Silver	Bronze
57 kg	Vladimir Dubov; Bulgaria	Mehmed Feraim; Bulgaria	John Pineda; Canada
57 kg	Vladimir Dubov; Bulgaria	Mehmed Feraim; Bulgaria	Georgi Vangelov; Bulgaria
61 kg	Peiman Biabani; Iran	Abolfazl Hajipour; Iran	Dimitar Ivanov; Bulgaria
61 kg	Peiman Biabani; Iran	Abolfazl Hajipour; Iran	Krum Chuchurov; Bulgaria
65 kg	Franklin Gómez; Puerto Rico	Borislav Novachkov; Bulgaria	Filip Novachkov; Bulgaria
65 kg	Franklin Gómez; Puerto Rico	Borislav Novachkov; Bulgaria	Batboldyn Nomin; Mongolia
70 kg	Magomedmurad Gadzhiev; Poland	Nikolay Kurtev; Bulgaria	Oktay Salim; Bulgaria
70 kg	Magomedmurad Gadzhiev; Poland	Nikolay Kurtev; Bulgaria	Georgi Zlatov; Bulgaria
74 kg	Evgeniy Nedyalko; Moldova	Krystian Brzozowski; Poland	Miroslav Kirov; Bulgaria
74 kg	Evgeniy Nedyalko; Moldova	Krystian Brzozowski; Poland	Rashid Kurbanov; Uzbekistan
86 kg	Ali Mojerloo; Iran	Zbigniew Baranowski; Poland	Sebastian Jezierzański; Poland
86 kg	Ali Mojerloo; Iran	Zbigniew Baranowski; Poland	Orgodolyn Üitümen; Mongolia
97 kg	Radosław Baran; Poland	Maciej Balawender; Poland	Jozef Jaloviar; Slovakia
97 kg	Radosław Baran; Poland	Maciej Balawender; Poland	Egzon Shala; Albania
125 kg	Deng Zhiwei; China	Amir Reza Amiri; Iran	Robert Baran; Poland
125 kg	Deng Zhiwei; China	Amir Reza Amiri; Iran	Elounes Bouzid; Algeria

=== Greco-Roman ===
Event	Gold	Silver	Bronze
59 kg	Aleksandar Kostadinov; Bulgaria	Gevorg Gharibyan; Armenia	Mohammad Reza Geraei; Iran
59 kg	Aleksandar Kostadinov; Bulgaria	Gevorg Gharibyan; Armenia	Ahmed Taha; Egypt
66 kg	Konstantin Stas; Bulgaria	Svilen Kostadinov; Bulgaria	Mohammad Hosseini; Iran
66 kg	Konstantin Stas; Bulgaria	Svilen Kostadinov; Bulgaria	Wuileixis Rivas; Venezuela
71 kg	Mihran Harutyunyan; Armenia	Akram Boudjemline; Algeria	Davide Cascavilla; Italy
75 kg	Karapet Chalyan; Armenia	Ilian Georgiev; Bulgaria	Luis Avendaño; Venezuela
75 kg	Karapet Chalyan; Armenia	Ilian Georgiev; Bulgaria	Daniel Aleksandrov; Bulgaria
80 kg	Mahdi Asgar Ebrahimi; Iran	Rashad Mahmoud; Egypt	Keyvan Rezaei Dalini; Iran
85 kg	Nikolai Bayrakov; Bulgaria	Maksim Manukyan; Armenia	Artur Shahinyan; Armenia
85 kg	Nikolai Bayrakov; Bulgaria	Maksim Manukyan; Armenia	Keyvan Rezaei Dalini; Iran
98 kg	Artur Aleksanyan; Armenia	Elis Guri; Bulgaria	Amir Hossein Hosseini; Iran
98 kg	Artur Aleksanyan; Armenia	Elis Guri; Bulgaria	Luillys Pérez; Venezuela
130 kg	Lyubomir Dimitrov; Bulgaria	Miloslav Metodiev; Bulgaria	Abdellatif Mohamed; Egypt

=== Women's freestyle ===
Event	Gold	Silver	Bronze
48 kg	Natalya Pulkovska; Ukraine	Patricia Bermúdez; Argentina	Miglena Selishka; Bulgaria
53 kg	Maria Prevolaraki; Greece	Natalia Budu; Moldova	Iulia Leorda; Moldova
53 kg	Maria Prevolaraki; Greece	Natalia Budu; Moldova	Aleksandrina Kashinova; Bulgaria
55 kg	Bilyana Dudova; Bulgaria	Elif Yanık; Turkey	Patricia Liuzzi; Italy
58 kg	Mimi Hristova; Bulgaria	Mariana Cherdivara; Moldova	Iryna Husyak; Ukraine
60 kg	Dzhanan Manolova; Bulgaria	Sofiya Georgieva; Bulgaria	Rabia Lamalsa; Algeria
63 kg	Yuliya Ostapchuk; Ukraine	Taybe Yusein; Bulgaria	Elina Vaseva; Bulgaria
69 kg	Alina Berezhna; Ukraine	Alla Cherkasova; Ukraine	Viktoria Bobeva; Bulgaria
76 kg	Svetlana Saenko; Moldova	Boryana Borisova; Bulgaria	Ayşegül Özbege; Turkey

== Participating nations ==
222 competitors from 27 nations participated.

- Albania (1)
- Algeria (19)
- Armenia (8)
- Belarus (3)
- Bulgaria (66)
- Canada (2)
- Chile (1)
- China (5)
- Egypt (6)
- Greece (1)
- Iran (22)
- Israel (1)
- Italy (14)
- Kosovo (1)
- Macedonia (7)
- Moldova (9)
- Mongolia (6)
- Poland (13)
- Puerto Rico (2)
- Russia (1)
- Slovakia (11)
- Tajikistan (1)
- Turkey (7)
- Ukraine (7)
- Uzbekistan (1)
- Venezuela (6)
