= Sayatbek Okassov =

Kazakhstani freestyle wrestler

Personal information
- Born: 7 July 1991 (age 35)
- Height: 166 cm (5 ft 5 in)

Sport
- Country: Kazakhstan
- Sport: Amateur wrestling
- Weight class: 65 kg
- Event: Freestyle
Medal record
Men's freestyle wrestling
Representing Kazakhstan
Asian Games
Bronze medal – third place	2018 Jakarta	65 kg
Asian Championships
Silver medal – second place	2019 Xi'an	65 kg

Sayatbek Okassov (born 7 July 1991) is a Kazakhstani freestyle wrestler. He won the silver medal in the men's 65 kg event at the 2019 Asian Wrestling Championships held in Xi'an, China.

== Career ==
In 2014, Okassov competed in the 65 kg event at the World Wrestling Championships in Tashkent, Uzbekistan where he lost his only match against Franklin Gómez of Puerto Rico. In the following year, 2015, he was also eliminated from the competition after one match, this time against Toghrul Asgarov of Azerbaijan.

In 2016, Okassov competed at the first qualification tournament hoping to qualify for the 2016 Summer Olympics in Rio de Janeiro, Brazil. This was unsuccessful as he was eliminated from the tournament in his second match.

In 2018, Okassov represented Kazakhstan at the Asian Games held in Indonesia and won one of the bronze medals in the men's 65 kg event.

== Achievements ==
Year	Tournament	Location	Result	Event
2018	Asian Games	Jakarta, Indonesia	3rd	Freestyle 65 kg
2019	Asian Championships	Xi'an, China	2nd	Freestyle 65 kg
