= Azerbaijan at the 2014 Winter Olympics =

- IOC code: AZE
- NOC: National Olympic Committee of the Republic of Azerbaijan
- Website: www.olympic.az (in Azerbaijani and English)

in Sochi
- Competitors: 4 in 2 sports
- Flag bearers: Rahman Khalilov (opening); Alexei Sitnikov (closing)
- Medals: Gold 0 Silver 0 Bronze 0 Total 0

Winter Olympics appearances (overview)
- 1998; 2002; 2006; 2010; 2014; 2018; 2022; 2026

Other related appearances
- Soviet Union (1956–1988)

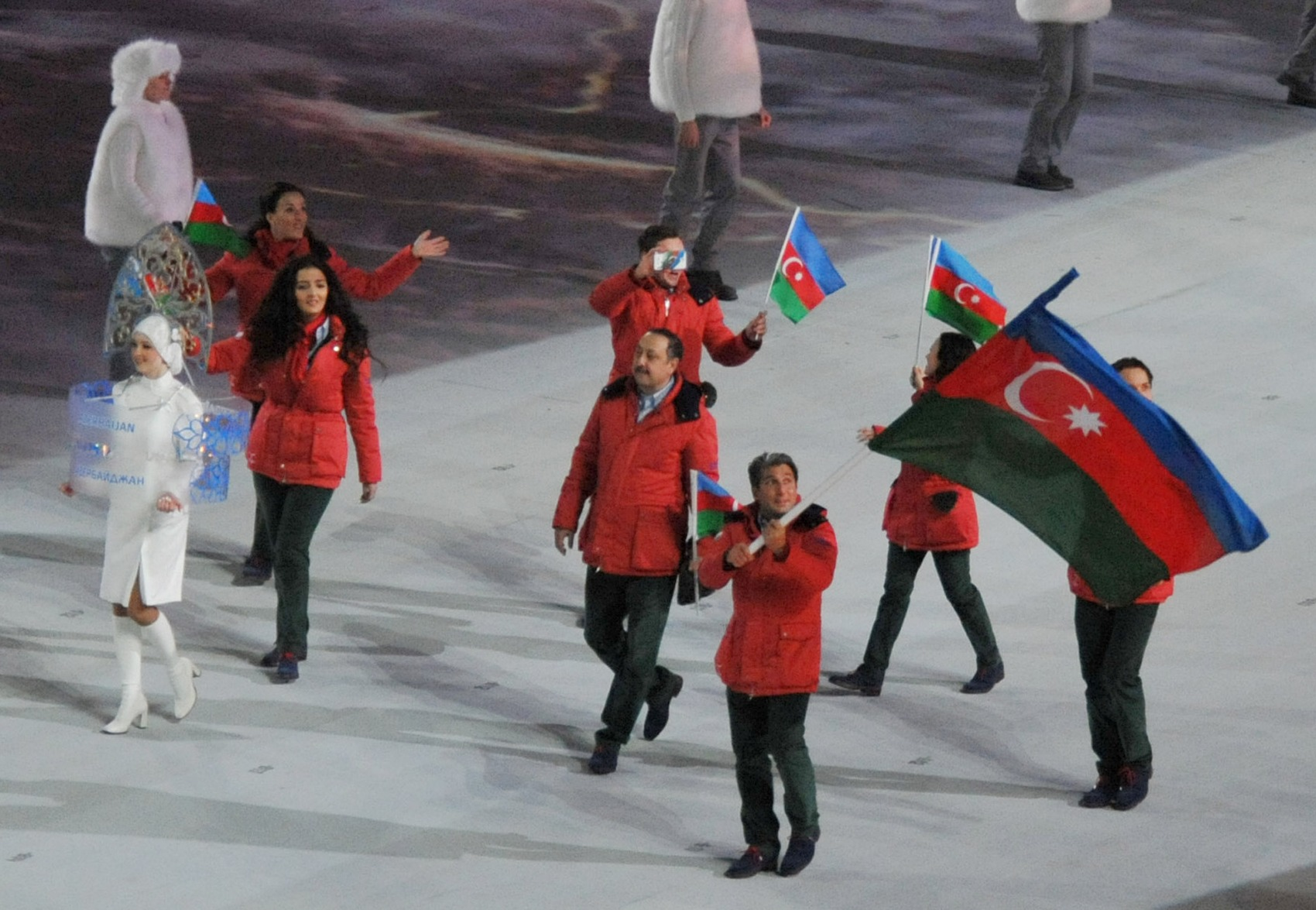
The Azerbaijani team at the opening ceremony

Azerbaijan competed at the 2014 Winter Olympics in Sochi, Russia from 7 to 23 February 2014. Even though all the athletes that competed for Azerbaijan were foreign-born, the head of the Azerbaijani delegation at the Sochi Olympics Kenul Nurullayeva said: "if Azerbaijan is mentioned, at least for three times during the opening ceremony of the Olympics, it will be a big deal for us. What else do we need besides the publicity? We work for this".

At the 2014 Winter Olympics Azerbaijan offered the biggest bonuses for medal-winning athletes among other competing countries ($510,000 for gold, $255,000 for silver and $130,000 for bronze medal).

Rahman Khalilov, president of the country's winter sport federation carried the flag during the opening ceremony.

== Alpine skiing ==
According to the quota allocation released on 20 January 2014, Azerbaijan has qualified two athletes. Gaia Bassani Antivari had to withdraw from competition, because she sustained an injury during training.

| Athlete | Event | Run 1 | | Run 2 | | Total | |
| Athlete | Event | Time | Rank | Time | Rank | Time | Rank |
|---|---|---|---|---|---|---|---|
| Patrick Brachner | Men's giant slalom | 1:31.32 | 60 | 1:32.31 | 53 | 3:03.63 | 53 |
| Patrick Brachner | Men's slalom | DNF | | | | | |
| Gaia Bassani Antivari | Women's slalom | DNS | | | | | |

== Figure skating ==
Azerbaijan has achieved the following quota places:

| Athlete | Event | OD | | FD | | Total | |
| Athlete | Event | Points | Rank | Points | Rank | Points | Rank |
|---|---|---|---|---|---|---|---|
| Julia Zlobina; Alexei Sitnikov | Ice dancing | 58.15 | 14 Q | 90.48 | 11 | 148.63 | 12 |
