= Ikhtiyor Navruzov =

Uzbekistani freestyle wrestler

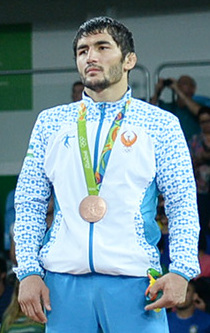
- Navruzov at the 2016 Olympics

Personal information
- Full name: Ikhtiyor Navruzov
- Nationality: Uzbekistan
- Born: 5 July 1989 (age 37) Bukhara, Uzbek SSR, Soviet Union
- Height: 1.66 m (5 ft 5 in)

Sport
- Country: Uzbekistan
- Sport: Wrestling
- Weight class: 65-74 kg
- Event: Freestyle

Achievements and titles
- Olympic finals: (bronze) (2016)
- World finals: (silver) (2015)
- Regional finals: (gold) (2018)
Medal record
Men's freestyle wrestling
Representing Uzbekistan
Olympic Games
| Bronze medal – third place | 2016 Rio de Janeiro | 65 kg |
World Championships
| Silver medal – second place | 2015 Las Vegas | 65 kg |
Asian Games
| Bronze medal – third place | 2014 Incheon | 65 kg |
Asian Championships
| Gold medal – first place | 2018 Bishkek | 70 kg |
| Silver medal – second place | 2017 New Delhi | 70 kg |
| Silver medal – second place | 2011 Tashkent | 66 kg |
| Bronze medal – third place | 2010 New Delhi | 66 kg |
| Bronze medal – third place | 2014 Astana | 70 kg |
| Bronze medal – third place | 2021 Almaty | 74 kg |
Islamic Solidarity Games
| Bronze medal – third place | 2021 Konya | 74 kg |
World Juniors Championships
| Bronze medal – third place | 2008 Istanbul | 66 kg |

Ikhtiyor Navruzov (born 5 July 1989 in Bukhara) is an Uzbek freestyle wrestler. He competed in the 66 kg event at the 2012 Summer Olympics and lost the quarter finals match against India's Sushil Kumar. He is a 2015 World Wrestling Championships silver medalist in the 65 kg, gold medalist of 2018 Bishkek, 2-time (2011 Tashkent, 2017 New Delhi) silver medalist and 2-time bronze medalist (2010 New Delhi, 2021 Almaty) of Asian Wrestling Championships.

== Biography ==
Navruzov was born on 5 July in 1989 in Bukhara, Uzbekistan. He started wrestling at the age of ten. He was brought to the section by his cousins. In 2001 he became the Uzbekistan youth champion. Success at the junior level allowed Ikhtiyor to study at the Republican College of Olympic Reserve. In 2008, Navruzov became the bronze medalist of the World Junior Wrestling Championships, that was held in Istanbul, Turkey. In 2010, Navruzov was close to winning a medal at the Asian Summer Games, but lost to Kazakhstani Leonid Spiridonov in the fight for third place. In March 2012, Ikhtiyor won a landslide victory in the Asian qualification tournament and received the right to compete at the London Olympics. In August 2012, Ikhtiyor Navruzov took part in the Summer Olympic Games in London. The Uzbek wrestler began his performances from the 1/8 final stage, where he defeated the bronze medalist of the 2008 Games, Georgian Otar Tushishvili. In the quarterfinals, Ihtiyor lost to Sushil Kumar after three rounds. After this defeat, Navruzov was able to continue his performances in the repechage round of the competition as Kumar became a finalist in the Olympic tournament. The first rival of Ihtiyork on the way to bronze was the Olympic champion Ramazan Shahin. The Uzbek wrestler was unable to offer serious resistance to his opponent and dropped out of the further fight for medals. In September 2014, Ikhtiyor Navruzov became the bronze medalist of the Asian Games. The Uzbek wrestler achieved the biggest success in his career in 2015. At the World Championships in American Las Vegas, Navruzov was able to reach the final in the category up to 65 kg, defeating two winners of the previous world championship, Mongolian wrestler Ganzorigiin Mandakhnaran and Russian Soslan Ramonov, during the tournament. The decisive fight was held in a stubborn struggle, but in the end, the Italian wrestler Frank Chamiso became the world champion.

== Rio 2016 ==
Navruzov won a bronze medal at the 2016 Summer Olympics in the 65 kg freestyle wrestling event against Mongolia's Ganzorigiin Mandakhnaran. The Mongolian coaches protested the loss, as Navruzov won a penalty point on a technicality in the final seconds of the match. Upon realizing he had won bronze, Navruzov twice screamed "Allahu Akbar," the Islamic Takbir. Before the bout against Ganzorigiin Mandakhnaran, Navruzov was also part of another controversy where he defeated Puerto Rico's Franklin Gómez, which would result of an investigation made by the United World Wrestling that would suspend four judges from Georgia, South Korea, Germany and Russia.

=== Match against Franklin Gómez ===
At the 2016 Olympics in Rio de Janeiro, Brazil, Navruzov faced Franklin Gómez of Puerto Rico. Gómez and Navruzov were tied 5–5 in the second round. As the fight was about to end, Gómez made a move that took Navruzov outside of the ring, initially warranting two points for Gómez. However, one of the officers argued that the move favored Navruzov, forcing Gómez' corner to challenge the call. When the officers decided against him, the bout ended 8–5 for Navruzov.

Shortly after the fight, at least three officers in charge of the match were suspended by United World Wrestling because of "suspicious officiating". They also claimed that an investigation would be done, but their decision couldn't be overturned. On 3 September 2016, it was announced that at least three officers were officially expelled from the UWW, without offering the reasons for the expulsion.

=== Match against Ganzorigiin Mandakhnaran ===
During the second bronze medal match between Navruzov and Mongolia's Ganzorigiin Mandakhnaran in the 65 kg freestyle wrestling caused controversy over Navruzov being awarded two penalty points toward the end of the match. During the final seconds, Mandakhnaran held a lead of 7–6 and began celebrating before the match had concluded. In response, Navruzov was awarded a penalty point for Mandakhnaran "failing to engage" during the end of the match, which resulted in Navruzov winning the bronze due to scoring the last point. The Mongolian coaches protested the point, which could not be challenged, by stripping in front of the judges on the mat, resulting in a shoe being sent into the judges' table. Navruzov would be awarded a second penalty point as the coaches were escorted away from the mat, leading to the final score being 7–8.
