= Wrestling at the 2014 Asian Games – Men's freestyle 65 kg =

Men's freestyle 65 kg at the 2014 Asian Games
- Venue: Dowon Gymnasium
- Date: 28 September 2014
- Competitors: 12 from 12 nations

Medalists
gold medal	Yogeshwar Dutt	India
silver medal	Zalimkhan Yusupov	Tajikistan
bronze medal	Yeerlanbieke Katai	China
bronze medal	Ikhtiyor Navruzov	Uzbekistan

The men's freestyle 65 kilograms wrestling competition at the 2014 Asian Games in Incheon was held on 28 September 2014 at the Dowon Gymnasium.

== Schedule ==
All times are Korea Standard Time (UTC+09:00)

Date	Time	Event
Sunday, 28 September 2014	13:00	1/8 finals
Sunday, 28 September 2014	13:00	Quarterfinals
Sunday, 28 September 2014	13:00	Semifinals
Sunday, 28 September 2014	13:00	Repechages
Sunday, 28 September 2014	19:00	Finals

== Results ==
Legend

- F — Won by fall

=== Main bracket ===
1/8 finals
Batchuluuny Batmagnai (MGL)	10
Chamara Perera (SRI)	0
Ghazwan Lazkani (SYR)	0
Tomotsugu Ishida (JPN)	10
Zalimkhan Yusupov (TJK)	4
Ulukman Mamatov (KGZ)	3
Ikhtiyor Navruzov (UZB)	10
Abdulrahman Ibrahim (QAT)	0

Quarterfinals
Dauren Zhumagaziyev (KAZ)	6
Yeerlanbieke Katai (CHN)	4^{F}
Yogeshwar Dutt (IND)	7
Kang Jin-hyok (PRK)	4
Batchuluuny Batmagnai (MGL)	2
Tomotsugu Ishida (JPN)	2
Zalimkhan Yusupov (TJK)	10
Ikhtiyor Navruzov (UZB)	8

Semifinals
Yeerlanbieke Katai (CHN)	7
Yogeshwar Dutt (IND)	9^{F}
Tomotsugu Ishida (JPN)	5
Zalimkhan Yusupov (TJK)	5

Gold medal
Yogeshwar Dutt (IND)	1
Zalimkhan Yusupov (TJK)	0

=== Repechage ===
Repechage
Ulukman Mamatov (KGZ)	0
Ikhtiyor Navruzov (UZB)	10

Bronze medals
Kang Jin-hyok (PRK)	6
Yeerlanbieke Katai (CHN)	11
Ikhtiyor Navruzov (UZB)	5
Tomotsugu Ishida (JPN)	5

== Final standing ==
Rank	Athlete
1st place, gold medalist(s)	Yogeshwar Dutt (IND)
2nd place, silver medalist(s)	Zalimkhan Yusupov (TJK)
3rd place, bronze medalist(s)	Yeerlanbieke Katai (CHN)
3rd place, bronze medalist(s)	Ikhtiyor Navruzov (UZB)
5	Kang Jin-hyok (PRK)
5	Tomotsugu Ishida (JPN)
7	Batchuluuny Batmagnai (MGL)
8	Ulukman Mamatov (KGZ)
9	Dauren Zhumagaziyev (KAZ)
10	Abdulrahman Ibrahim (QAT)
10	Ghazwan Lazkani (SYR)
10	Chamara Perera (SRI)
