= Russian National Freestyle 2016 – Men's freestyle 65 kg =

The men's freestyle 65 kg is a competition featured at the 2016 Russian National Freestyle Wrestling Championships, and was held in Yakutsk, Russia on May 29.

== Medalists ==
Gold	(North Ossetia–Alania) Soslan Ramonov
Silver	(Krasnoyarsk Krai) Israil Kasumov
Bronze	(Krasnoyarsk Krai) Murad Nukhkadiev
Bronze	(North Ossetia–Alania) Alan Gogaev

== Results ==
Legend

- F — Won by fall

=== Finals ===
Final
(Krasnoyarsk Krai) Israil Kasumov	3
(North Ossetia–Alania) Soslan Ramonov	8

=== Top half ===
Round of 32

Round of 16
(Krasnoyarsk Krai) Murad Nukhkadiev	15
(Saint Petersburg) Magomed Magomedv	12
(Sakha Republic) Rustam Masharipov	3
(Chuvashia) Ivan Philippov	5
(North Ossetia–Alania) Gamlet Ramonov	1
(Krasnoyarsk Krai) Israil Kasumov	7
(Sakha Republic) Viktor Stepanov	11
(Buryatia) Agvan Shadapov	0

Quarterfinals
(Krasnoyarsk Krai) Murad Nukhkadiev	6
(Chuvashia) Ivan Philippov	3
(Krasnoyarsk Krai) Israil Kasumov	2
(Sakha Republic) Viktor Stepanov	0

Semifinals
(Krasnoyarsk Krai) Murad Nukhkadiev	2
(Krasnoyarsk Krai) Israil Kasumov	6

=== Bottom half ===
Round of 32
(Moscow) Ratmir Kerefov	0
(Moscow) Arsen Yusupov	2
(Sakha Republic) Aleksey Ivanov	2
(Chechnya) Rasul Dzhukayev	6
(Buryatia) Aleksey Borovitsky	10
(Moscow Oblast) Ramazan Ramazanov	0
(North Ossetia–Alania) Alan Gogaev	10
(Tuva) Chudak Mengi	0

Round of 16
(North Ossetia–Alania) Soslan Ramonov	21^{F}
(Republic of Crimea (Russia)) Anzor Zakuev	12
(North Ossetia–Alania) Azamat Kabisov	8
(Samara Oblast) Grigor Seropyan	3
(Moscow) Arsen Yusupov	2
(Chechnya) Rasul Dzhukayev	5
(Buryatia) Aleksey Borovitsky	2
(North Ossetia–Alania) Alan Gogaev	6

Quarterfinals
(North Ossetia–Alania) Soslan Ramonov	7
(North Ossetia–Alania) Azamat Kabisov	4
(Chechnya) Rasul Dzhukayev	0
(North Ossetia–Alania) Alan Gogaev	8

Semifinals
(North Ossetia–Alania) Soslan Ramonov	4
(North Ossetia–Alania) Alan Gogaev	1

=== Repechage ===
Repechage round 2
(North Ossetia–Alania) Gamlet Ramonov	6
(Sakha Republic) Viktor Stepanov	0^{F}
(Republic of Crimea (Russia)) Anzor Zakuev	16
(North Ossetia–Alania) Azamat Kabisov	8

Bronze medals
(Sakha Republic) Viktor Stepanov	4
(Krasnoyarsk Krai) Murad Nukhkadiev	7
(Republic of Crimea (Russia)) Anzor Zakuev	2
(North Ossetia–Alania) Alan Gogaev	5
