= Gaia Bassani Antivari =

Italian-Azerbaijani alpine skier (born 1978)

Personal information
- Full name: Gaia Elena Bassani-Antivari
- Born: 8 July 1978 (age 48) Milan, Italy
- Height: 167 cm (5 ft 6 in)

Skiing career
- Sport: Alpine skiing
- Disciplines: Slalom, giant slalom

Olympics
- Teams: 2 – (2010, 2014)
- Medals: 0

World Championships
- Teams: 2 – (2001, 2009)
- Medals: 0
Medal record
Women's alpine skiing
Representing Azerbaijan

Gaia Bassani Antivari (born July 8, 1978) is an Italian-born alpine skier who competed for Azerbaijan at the 2010 Winter Olympics, and 2014.

She previously competed for Grenada, and attempted to compete for them at the 2002 Winter Olympics. However, she couldn't as the GOA did not submit paperwork. She withdrew from the slalom of 2014 Olympic Winter Games due to a serious injury suffered just three days before the race.
