= Zalimkhan Yusupov (wrestler) =

Tajikistani wrestler

Personal information
- Nationality: Russia
- Born: 19 February 1984 (age 42) Makhachkala, Dagestan, Russian SFSR, Soviet Union
- Height: 1.65 m (5 ft 5 in)

Sport
- Country: Russia; Tajikistan
- Sport: Wrestling
- Event: Freestyle
Medal record
Representing Tajikistan
Men's Freestyle wrestling
Asian Games
Silver medal – second place	2014 Incheon	65 kg

Zalimkhan Yusupov (born 19 February 1984 in Makhachkala) is a Russian-born Tajikistani freestyle wrestler. He competed in the freestyle 66 kg event at the 2012 Summer Olympics; after defeating Alan Gogayev in the qualifications, he was eliminated by Haislan Garcia in the 1/8 finals.
