= Azerbaijan at the 2010 Winter Olympics =

- IOC code: AZE
- NOC: National Olympic Committee of the Republic of Azerbaijan
- Website: www.olympic.az (in Azerbaijani and English)

in Vancouver
- Competitors: 2 in 1 sport
- Flag bearer: Fuad Guliyev
- Medals: Gold 0 Silver 0 Bronze 0 Total 0

Winter Olympics appearances (overview)
- 1998; 2002; 2006; 2010; 2014; 2018; 2022; 2026

Other related appearances
- Soviet Union (1956–1988)

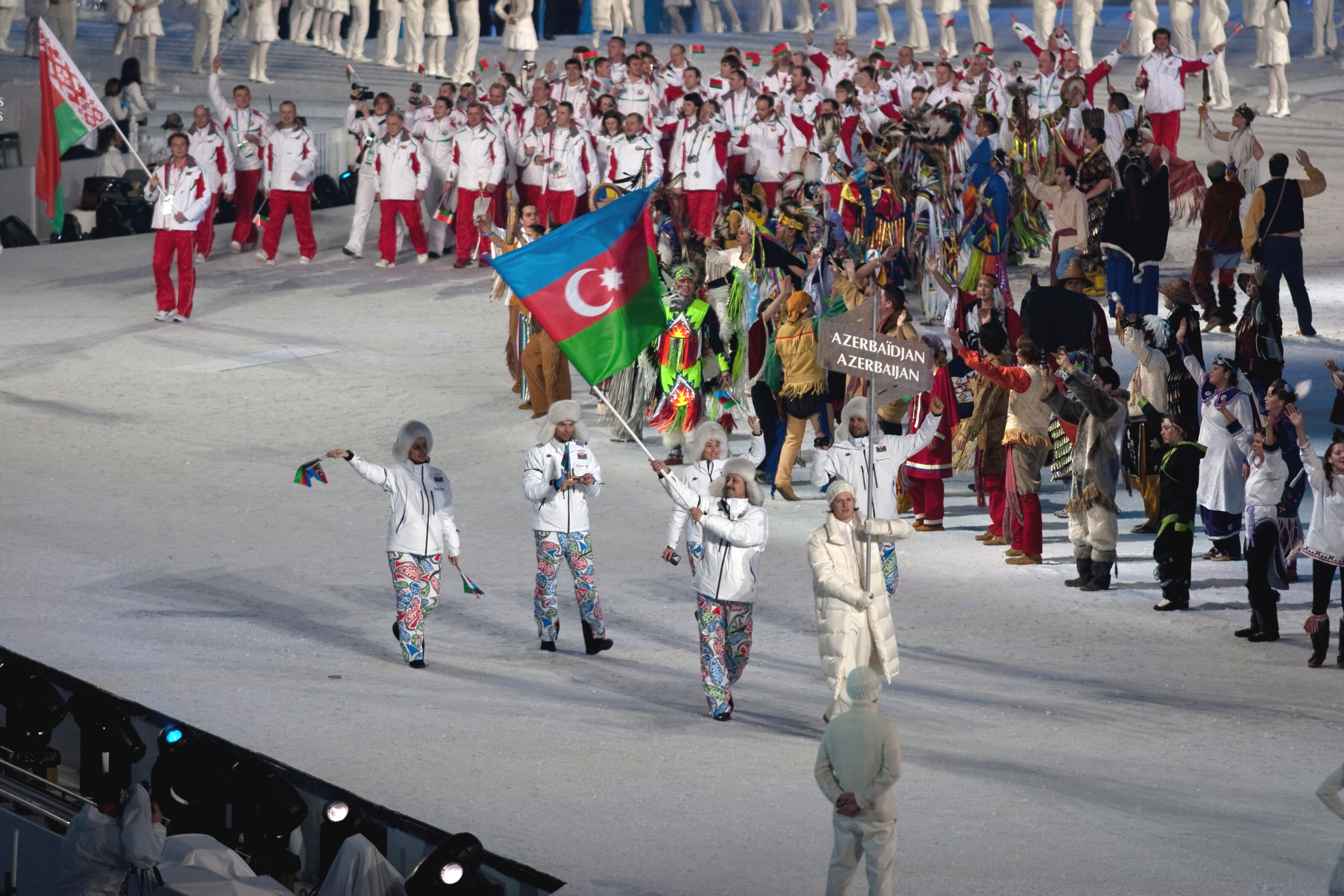
The Azerbaijani team at the opening ceremony

Azerbaijan sent a delegation to compete at the 2010 Winter Olympics in Vancouver, British Columbia, Canada from 12–28 February 2010. This was Azerbaijan's fourth Olympic Winter Games, having appeared in each Winter Games since 1998 in Nagano. The Azerbaijani delegation consisted of two alpine skiers, Gaia Bassani Antivari and Jedrij Notz. The nation's best finish was by Antivari, 57th place in the women's giant slalom.

== Background ==
The National Olympic Committee of the Republic of Azerbaijan was created in 1992 following the dissolution of the Soviet Union, and was recognized by the International Olympic Committee on 1 January 1993. Azerbaijan has sent delegations to every Olympics since the 1996 Summer Olympics, first entering the Winter Olympics in Nagano in 1998. While the nation has won many medals in the Summer Olympics, as of the close of the Vancouver Olympics, they have never medalled in the Winter Olympics. The Azerbaijani delegation to Vancouver consisted of two alpine skiers, Gaia Bassani Antivari and Jedrij Notz. Fuad Guliyev, an official, was chosen as the flag bearer for the opening ceremony, while Konul Nurullayera, the chef de mission, performed the flag bearer duties for the closing ceremony.

== Alpine skiing ==
Gaia Bassani Antivari was 31 years old at the time of the Vancouver Olympics, and was making her only appearance at the Olympics. Jedrij Notz was 35 years old, and likewise making his only appearance at an Olympic Games. On 23 February, Notz took part in the men's giant slalom, posting run times of 1 minute and 30 seconds and 1 minute and 35 seconds. His combined time of 3 minutes and 6 seconds put him in 72nd place for the competition, out of 81 competitors to finish both legs of the race. The next day, 24 February, Antivari raced in the women's giant slalom. Due to challenging weather conditions, the second run of the race was run on 25 February. On Wednesday she finished her first leg in a time of 1 minute and 30 seconds, and improved her time on the day after to 1 minute and 26 seconds. Her combined time of 2 minutes and 56 seconds put her into 57th position for the competition. On 26 February, she ran in the women's slalom, but failed to finish the first leg. On Saturday, in the last race in Vancouver, Notz would have the same fate as his compatriot in the men's slalom, also failing to finish.

Athlete	Event	Run 1	Run 2	Total	Rank
Jedrij Notz	Men's giant slalom	1:30.78	1:35.20	3:05.98	72
Jedrij Notz	Men's slalom	DNF			
Gaia Bassani Antivari	Women's giant slalom	1:30.82	1:26.05	2:56.87	57
Gaia Bassani Antivari	Women's slalom	DNF			

== See also ==
- Azerbaijan at the 2010 Summer Youth Olympics
