= Jedrij Notz =

Azerbaijani alpine skier (born 1974)

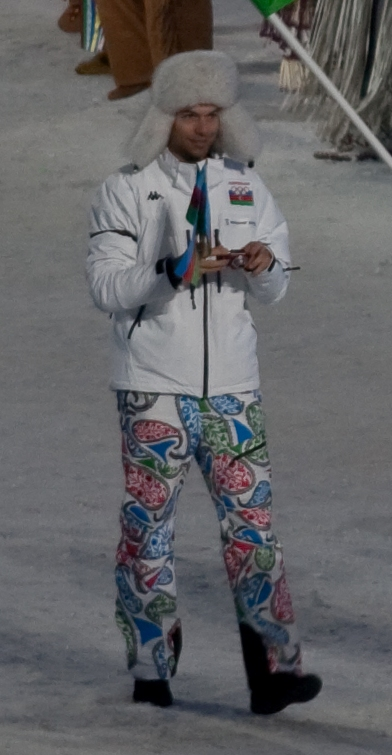
Jedrij Notz at 2010 Winter Olympics Opening Ceremony

Jedrij Notz (born 6 September 1974) is an Azerbaijani alpine skier who competed at the 2010 Winter Olympics.

Notz was the best man to Christopher O'Neill when O'Neill married the Swedish princess Madeleine.
