= Ahmad Mohammadi =

Iranian wrestler (born 1992)

Personal information
- Native name: سید احمد محمدی قادي کلایی
- Full name: Seyed Ahmad Mohammadi Gahdikolaei
- Nationality: Iran
- Born: January 11, 1992 (age 34) Qaem Shahr, Iran
- Height: 1.71 m (5 ft 7 in)
- Weight: 65 kg (143 lb)

Sport
- Country: Islamic Republic of Iran
- Sport: Wrestling
- Event: Freestyle
Medal record
Representing Iran
Men's freestyle wrestling
World Championships
Silver medal – second place	2014 Tashkent	65 kg
Bronze medal – third place	2015 Las Vegas	65 kg
Asian Championships
Gold medal – first place	2014 Astana	65 kg
World Cup
Gold medal – first place	2015 Los Angeles	65kg

Seyed Ahmad Mohammadi Ghadikalaei (Persian: سید احمد محمدی قادي کلایی, born 11 January 1992 in Qaem Shahr) is an Iranian wrestler who won the silver medal at the 2014 World Championships.
