= Yeerlanbieke Katai =

Chinese freestyle wrestler

Personal information
- Nationality: China
- Born: July 16, 1990 (age 36) Beijing, China
- Height: 169 cm (5 ft 7 in)
- Weight: 77 kg (170 lb)

Sport
- Country: China
- Sport: Wrestling
- Weight class: 65 kg
- Event: Freestyle
Medal record
Men's freestyle wrestling
Representing China
Asian Games
Bronze medal – third place	2014 Incheon	65 kg
Olympic Qualification Tournament
Silver medal – second place	2016 Astana	65 kg

Yeerlanbieke Katai (Chinese: 叶尔兰别克·卡泰, Kazakh: Ерланбек Кәтейұлы; born July 16, 1990) is a Chinese freestyle wrestler of Kazakh ethnicity. He competed in the men's freestyle 65 kg event at the 2016 Summer Olympics, in which he was eliminated in the round of 16 by Ganzorigiin Mandakhnaran.
