= Ganzorigiin Mandakhnaran =

Mongolian wrestler (born 1986)

Ganzorig Mandakhnaran
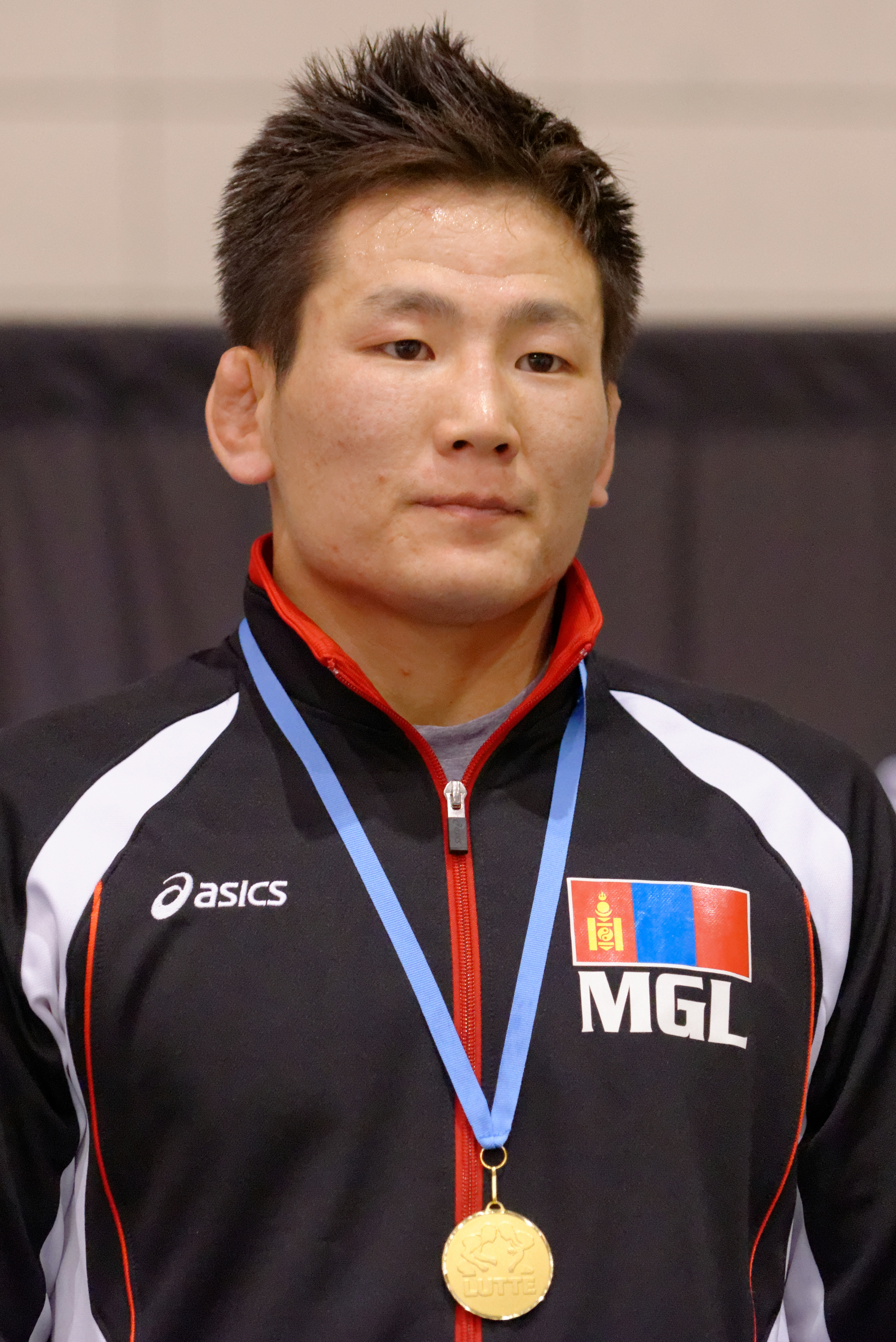
- At the 2014 Paris Golden Grand Prix

Personal information
- Native name: Ганзориг Мандахнаран
- Born: 11 May 1986 (age 40) Tuv, Mongolia
- Height: 1.65 m (5 ft 5 in)

Sport
- Country: Mongolia
- Sport: Wrestling
- Weight class: 65 kg (143 lb)
- Rank: Honored athlete of Mongolia
- Event: Freestyle
- Club: Aldar sports committee
- Coached by: Tserenbaataryn Khosbayar Tserenbaataryn Tsogtbayar

Achievements and titles
- Olympic finals: 5th (2016)
- World finals: (bronze) (2013) (bronze) (2014) 5th(2015)
- Regional finals: (gold) (2010) (silver) (2009) (silver) (2013) (silver) (2018) (bronze) (2015)
Medal record
Men's freestyle wrestling
Representing Mongolia
World Championships
Bronze medal – third place	2014 Tashkent	65 kg
Bronze medal – third place	2013 Budapest	66 kg
Asian Games
Gold medal – first place	2010 Guangzhou	60 kg
Asian Championships
Silver medal – second place	2018 Bishkek	74 kg
Silver medal – second place	2013 New Delhi	66 kg
Silver medal – second place	2009 Pattaya	60 kg
Bronze medal – third place	2015 Doha	65 kg
Summer Universiade
Bronze medal – third place	2013 Kazan	66 kg
Military World Games
Bronze medal – third place	2015 Mungyeong	70 kg
World Military Championships
Gold medal – first place	2014 New Jersey	70 kg
Golden Grand Prix Ivan Yarygin
Silver medal – second place	2019 Krasnoyarsk	70 kg
Bronze medal – third place	2016 Krasnoyarsk	65 kg
Ali Aliyev Tournament
Bronze medal – third place	2017 Kaspisk	70 kg
Yasar Dogu Tournament
Bronze medal – third place	2014 Istanbul	65 kg

Ganzorig Mandakhnaran (Mongolian: Ганзоригийн Мандахнаран; born 11 May 1986) is a male Mongolian wrestler who competes in the 66 kilograms (146 lb) category in freestyle wrestling. He was born in Töv province. He is a two-time world bronze medalist and Ivan Yarygin 2016 contestant.

He took bronze medal in the 66kg event at the 2013 World Championships, Mandakhnaran beat Semen Radulov 10–4, Gergõ Wöller 9–2, Andreas Triantafyllidis 11–3, lost by decision with a score of 6–6 to 2012 Olympic medalist Liván López in the semifinal, defeated Kang Jin-hyok 3–1.

He took second bronze medal in the 65kg event at the 2014 World Championships, Mandakhnaran beat Tital Dzhafarian 15–5, upsets reigning World champion David Safaryan by technical fall, lost to Soslan Ramonov by 0–11 in the quarterfinal, defeated 2011 vice World champion Franklin Gómez 6–4, and two-time Alexander Medved Prizes International champion Azamat Nurykau 8C–7.

He reached 5th place in the 2016 Summer Olympics in Rio de Janeiro after he was denied victory for not engaging with his opponent in the last seconds of their bronze medal contest. Mandakhnaran almost won bronze in the 65 kilograms (143 lb) event but in the final seconds when he was leading 7–6, he started prematurely celebrating in front of his opponent – Ikhtiyor Navruzov. A penalty point was awarded to Navruzov by the judges due to Mandakhnaran refusing to engage with his opponent during the round. Mandakhnaran's coach and trainer were so incensed by the decision that they took off their clothes in front of the judges, leading to another point being awarded to Navruzov for a final score of 7–8 with Navruzov becoming the victor. Both of his coaches would later be banned by the United World Wrestling until August 2019.

Mandakhnaran's career also includes victories over well-known wrestlers such as Zaurbek Sidakov, Magomedkhabib Kadimagomedov, and Yakup Gör.
