= Soslan Ramonov =

Russian freestyle wrestler

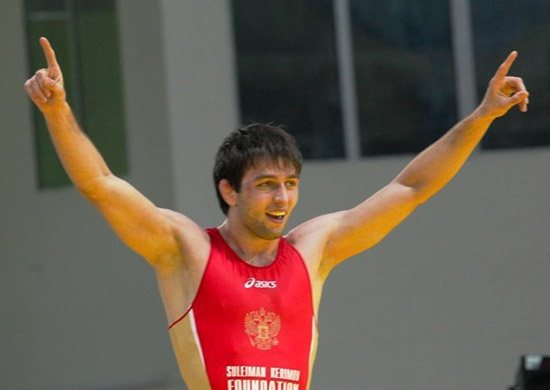
- Soslan Ramonov at the 2014 World Wrestling Championships in Tashkent, Uzbekistan

Personal information
- Full name: Soslan Lyudvikovich Ramonov
- Nationality: Russia
- Born: Сослан Людвикович Рамонов; 1 January 1991 (age 35) Tskhinvali, Georgian SSR, Soviet Union
- Height: 1.74 m (5 ft 9 in)

Sport
- Country: Russia
- Sport: Wrestling
- Weight class: 65 kg
- Event: Freestyle
- Club: Alania Wrestling Club; CSKA Wrestling Club
- Coached by: Anatoly Margiev

Achievements and titles
- Olympic finals: (gold) (2016)
- World finals: (gold) (2014) (bronze) (2015)
- National finals: (gold) (2014) (gold) (2016)
Medal record
Men's freestyle wrestling
Representing Russia
Olympic Games
| Gold medal – first place | 2016 Rio de Janeiro | 65 kg |
World Championships
| Gold medal – first place | 2014 Tashkent | 65 kg |
| Bronze medal – third place | 2015 Las Vegas | 65 kg |
World Cup
| Silver medal – second place | 2013 Tehran | 66 kg |
| Silver medal – second place | 2014 Los Angeles | 65 kg |
Military World Games
| Gold medal – first place | 2015 Mungyeong | 70 kg |
World Military Championships
| Gold medal – first place | 2017 Klaipėda | 70 kg |
| Gold medal – first place | 2018 Moscow | 70 kg |
European Nations Cup
| Gold medal – first place | 2011 Moscow | 66 kg |
| Gold medal – first place | 2012 Moscow | 66 kg |
| Gold medal – first place | 2013 Moscow | 65 kg |
Alexander Medved International
| Gold medal – first place | 2016 Minsk | 65 kg |
Golden Grand Prix Baku
| Bronze medal – third place | 2015 Baku | 65 kg |
Wenceslas Ziolkowski Memorial
| Gold medal – first place | 2011 Poznań | 66 kg |
| Gold medal – first place | 2014 Dąbrowa Górnicza | 70 kg |
European Cadets Championships
| Gold medal – first place | 2008 Daugavpils | 58 kg |
| Gold medal – first place | 2007 Warsaw | 54 kg |
Representing (North Ossetia–Alania) North Ossetia
Russian Championships
| Gold medal – first place | 2016 Yakutsk | 65 kg |
| Gold medal – first place | 2014 Yakutsk | 65 kg |
| Silver medal – second place | 2015 Kaspiisk | 65 kg |
| Silver medal – second place | 2013 Krasnoyarsk | 65 kg |
| Bronze medal – third place | 2012 Saint Petersburg | 66 kg |
Golden Grand Prix Ivan Yarygin
| Silver medal – second place | 2020 Krasnoyarsk | 65 kg |
| Bronze medal – third place | 2014 Krasnoyarsk | 65 kg |
| Bronze medal – third place | 2013 Krasnoyarsk | 66 kg |

Soslan Lyudvikovich Ramonov (Iron Ossetic: Рæмонаты Людвичы фырт Сослан; Russian: Сослан Людвикович Рамонов; born 1 January 1991) is a Russian retired freestyle wrestler of Ossetian origin. He is a 2016 Olympic gold medalist. In 2014 he won a national and a world title in the -65 kg category. He is coached by Anatoly Margiyev and his uncle, Stanislav Ramonov. His elder brother Alan and cousin Hamlet are also competitive wrestlers. In the final match of the Alexander Medved International tournament he beat the current World Champion Frank Chamizo of Italy. At the 2016 Olympics he beat Toghrul Asgarov of Azerbaijan in the final match.
