= Rahman Khalilov =

Azerbaijani-Swiss businessman

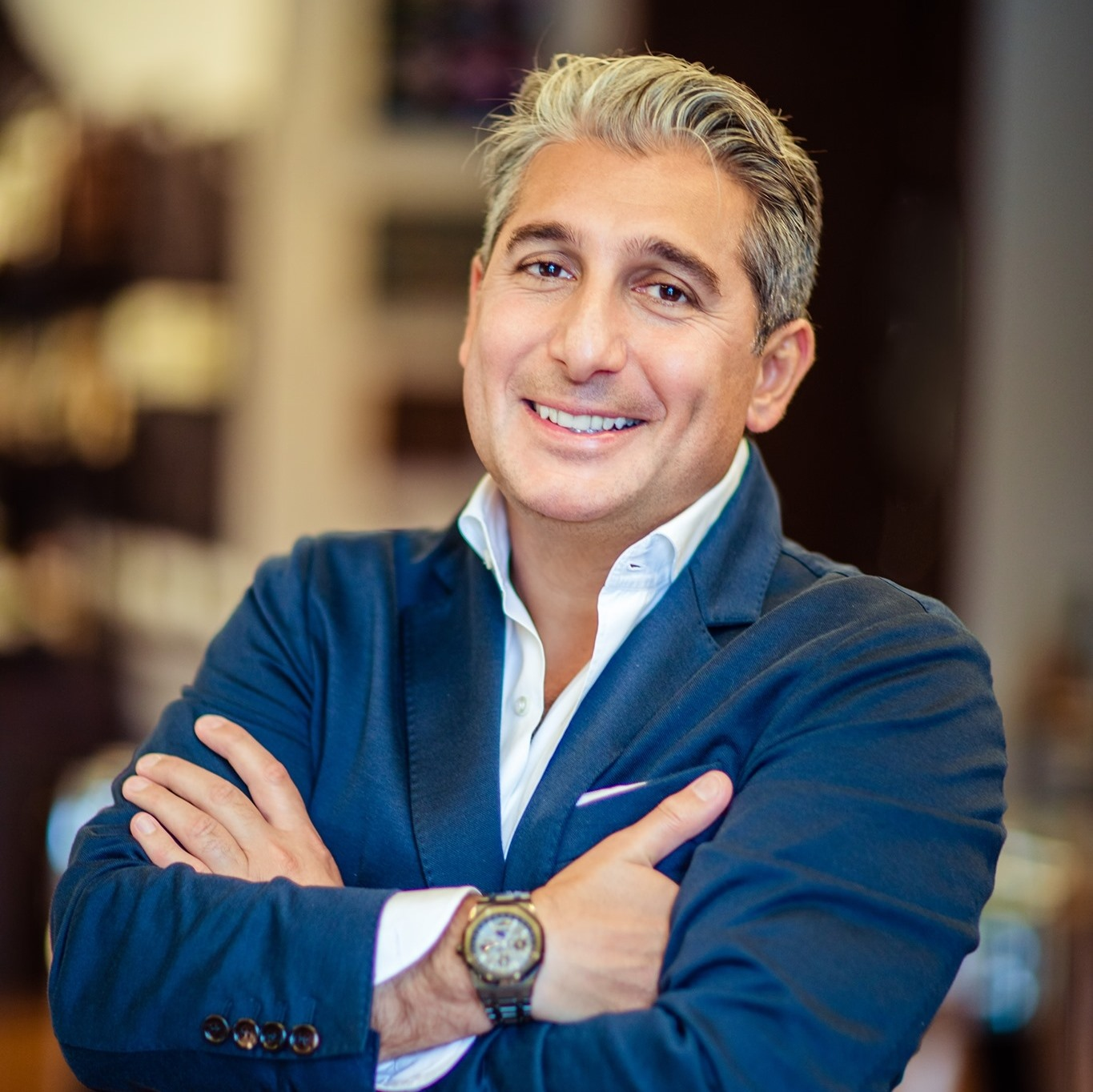
- Born: September 13, 1977 (age 48); Baku, Azerbaijan Soviet Socialist Republic, USSR
- Education: European University in Geneva (1998); International University of Geneva (2001)
- Known for: businessman and philanthropist

Rahman Khalilov (Azerbaijani: Rəhman Xəlilov, Russian: Рахман Халилов; born September 13, 1977, Baku, Azerbaijan) is a Russian and Azerbaijani businessman and philanthropist. The banner-bearer of the Azerbaijani national team at the opening ceremony of the 2014 Winter Olympics in Sochi. President of the Azerbaijan Winter Sports Federation (2013–2015).

== Biography ==
Born in Baku, grew up in Moscow in Russia. In 1998 he graduated from the European University in Geneva (Switzerland). In 2001 graduated from the Faculty of International Business of the International University of Geneva.

== Career ==
During the period from 1997 to 2007, he worked in various positions in the companies Lukoil-Turkey and Litasko S.A. (Switzerland), included in the structure of Lukoil PJSC, as well as in the position of the head of the oil trading company RIROIL (Switzerland).

In 2008, he founded REILGO (previously under the brand ISR Trans), a large business for the transportation of oil and petroleum products. The company specializes in providing freight forwarding services for the transportation of crude oil, liquefied hydrocarbon gases, petroleum products and petrochemical products by railway and water transport.

Under the leadership of Khalilov, the company became one of the leaders in the cargo transportation market and one of the largest owners of tank cars in Russia (3rd in the country). According to Khalilov, the company is one of the top three logistics companies in Russia, transporting 18 million tons of oil per year. The rolling stock fleet of RAILGO company includes over 30 thousand units. The volume of cargo transportation in 2019 was 30 million tons. The structure of RAILGO also includes a company providing services for transshipment of petroleum products in Taganrog – Kurgannefteprodukt LLC. This company operates the Taganrog fuel oil terminal (TMT LLC). The main Russian partners of the company are NC ROSNEFT PJSC and LUKOIL-MarinBunker LLC.

“It is difficult to manage a large business in Russia. Everyone has his own path. There is no need to be afraid of anything. If you do not take any action, you will be trampled. The main condition for business is to be brave and strong." – Rakhman Khalilov, interview to vzglyad.az

In 2022, he founded a group of companies in Azerbaijan, R Group Holding, specialized in the management and development of industrial assets. The group provides full-cycle services for the development of sustainable and reliable industrial ecosystems: consulting in the field of investments and management of the industrial sector, production and extraction, transportation and logistics, design and development of IT systems for supply chain management.

== Charity ==
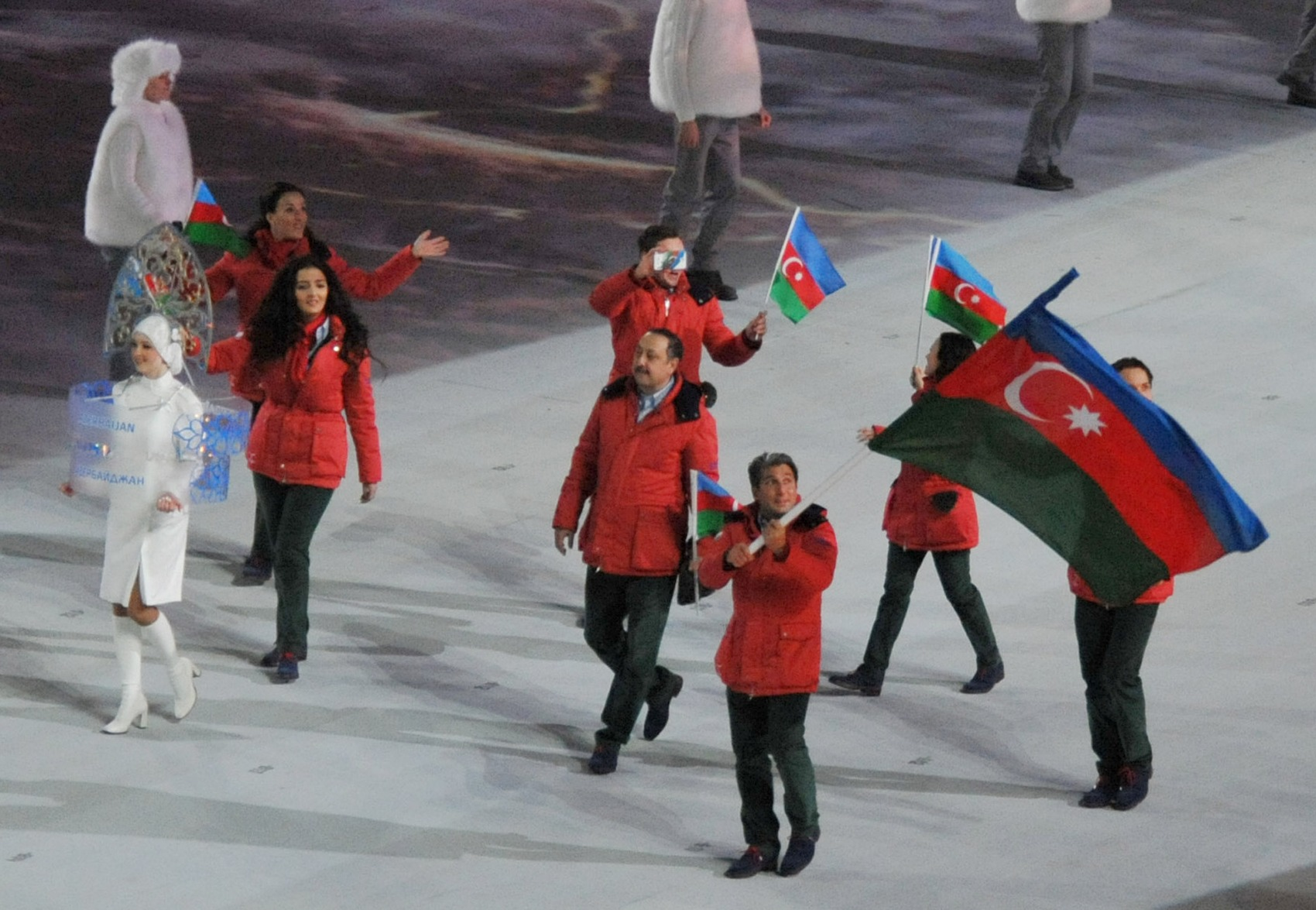
Mr. Khalilov carried the Azerbaijani flag during the opening ceremony of the Winter Olympic Games in Sochi

In 2017, he founded the charity project “Investing in the Future.” The project helps talented orphans, sportsmen and children from low-income families. Participants receive scholarship and targeted assistance and are involved in educational and cultural events.

== Parents ==
Father - Khalilov Iskender Agasalim hold a position of vice president of the oil company Lukoil and vice president of the state oil company Slavneft. At present, he is the founder and president of ISR-Holding, specializing in the production of iodine, automobile trading, development, hotel and restaurant business.
