= Wrestling at the 2016 Summer Olympics – Men's freestyle 65 kg =

Men's freestyle 65 kg at the Games of the XXXI Olympiad
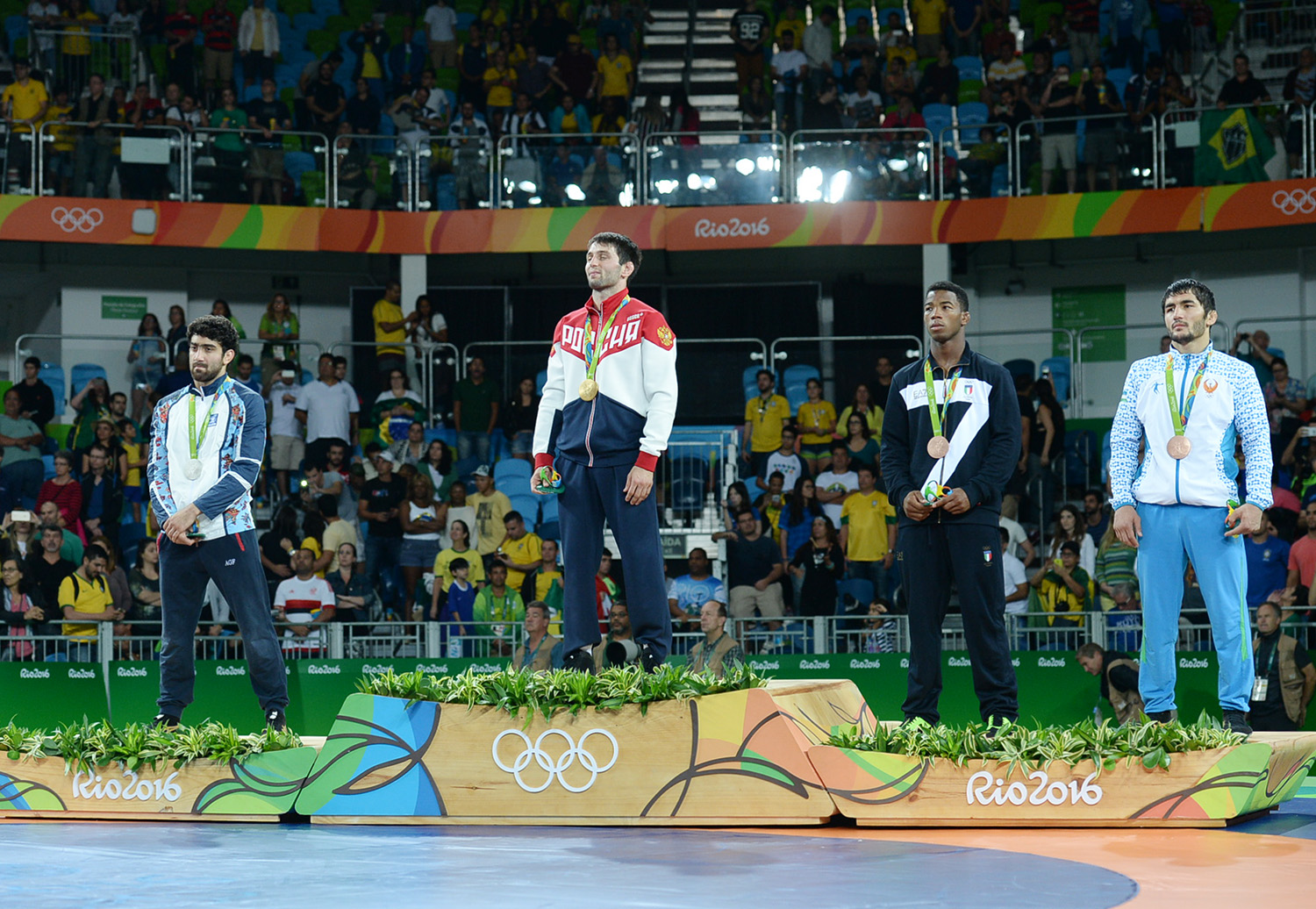
- Medalists
- Venue: Carioca Arena 2
- Date: 21 August 2016
- Competitors: 21 from 21 nations

Medalists
1st place, gold medalist(s)		Soslan Ramonov	Russia
2nd place, silver medalist(s)		Toghrul Asgarov	Azerbaijan
3rd place, bronze medalist(s)		Frank Chamizo	Italy
3rd place, bronze medalist(s)		Ikhtiyor Navruzov	Uzbekistan

Men's freestyle 65 kilograms competition at the 2016 Summer Olympics in Rio de Janeiro, Brazil, took place on August 21 at the Carioca Arena 2 in Barra da Tijuca.

This freestyle wrestling competition consists of a single-elimination tournament, with a repechage used to determine the winner of two bronze medals. The two finalists face off for gold and silver medals. Each wrestler who loses to one of the two finalists moves into the repechage, culminating in a pair of bronze medal matches featuring the semifinal losers each facing the remaining repechage opponent from their half of the bracket.

== Schedule ==
All times are Brasília Standard Time (UTC−03:00)

Date	Time	Event
21 August 2016	08:30	Qualification rounds
21 August 2016	13:00	Repechage
21 August 2016	13:45	Finals

== Results ==
Legend

- F — Won by fall

=== Final ===
Final
Toghrul Asgarov (AZE)	0
Soslan Ramonov (RUS)	11

=== Top half ===
Qualifications

1/8 finals
Frank Chamizo (ITA)	3
David Safaryan (ARM)	1
Zurabi Iakobishvili (GEO)	2
Amas Daniel (NGR)	1
Toghrul Asgarov (AZE)	12
Andriy Kviatkovskyi (UKR)	2
Frank Molinaro (USA)	2
Magomedmurad Gadzhiev (POL)	2

1/4 finals
Frank Chamizo (ITA)	4
Zurabi Iakobishvili (GEO)	3
Toghrul Asgarov (AZE)	10
Frank Molinaro (USA)	0

Semifinals
Frank Chamizo (ITA)	4
Toghrul Asgarov (AZE)	7

=== Bottom half ===
Qualifications
Borislav Novachkov (BUL)	10
Meisam Nassiri (IRI)	7
Yogeshwar Dutt (IND)	0
Ganzorigiin Mandakhnaran (MGL)	3
Yeerlanbieke Katai (CHN)	6
Sahit Prizreni (AUS)	1
Haislan Garcia (CAN)	1
Soslan Ramonov (RUS)	7
Alejandro Valdés (CUB)	4^{F}
Mustafa Kaya (TUR)	4

1/8 finals
Ikhtiyor Navruzov (UZB)	7
Adam Batirov (BRN)	7
Franklin Gómez (PUR)	7
Borislav Novachkov (BUL)	4
Ganzorigiin Mandakhnaran (MGL)	3
Yeerlanbieke Katai (CHN)	0
Soslan Ramonov (RUS)	11
Alejandro Valdés (CUB)	3

1/4 finals
Ikhtiyor Navruzov (UZB)	8
Franklin Gómez (PUR)	5
Ganzorigiin Mandakhnaran (MGL)	0
Soslan Ramonov (RUS)	6

Semifinals
Ikhtiyor Navruzov (UZB)	7
Soslan Ramonov (RUS)	18

=== Repechage ===
Repechage round 1
Haislan Garcia (CAN)	3
Alejandro Valdés (CUB)	3

Repechage round 2
Andriy Kviatkovskyi (UKR)	5
Frank Molinaro (USA)	8
Haislan Garcia (CAN)	0
Ganzorigiin Mandakhnaran (MGL)	3

Bronze medals
Frank Molinaro (USA)	3
Frank Chamizo (ITA)	5
Ganzorigiin Mandakhnaran (MGL)	7
Ikhtiyor Navruzov (UZB)	8

== Final standing ==
Rank	Athlete
1st place, gold medalist(s)	Soslan Ramonov (RUS)
2nd place, silver medalist(s)	Toghrul Asgarov (AZE)
3rd place, bronze medalist(s)	Frank Chamizo (ITA)
3rd place, bronze medalist(s)	Ikhtiyor Navruzov (UZB)
5	Frank Molinaro (USA)
5	Ganzorigiin Mandakhnaran (MGL)
7	Alejandro Valdés (CUB)
8	Borislav Novachkov (BUL)
9	Franklin Gómez (PUR)
10	Zurabi Iakobishvili (GEO)
11	Haislan Garcia (CAN)
12	Yeerlanbieke Katai (CHN)
13	Andriy Kviatkovskyi (UKR)
14	Adam Batirov (BRN)
15	Meisam Nassiri (IRI)
16	Magomedmurad Gadzhiev (POL)
17	Amas Daniel (NGR)
18	David Safaryan (ARM)
19	Sahit Prizreni (AUS)
20	Mustafa Kaya (TUR)
21	Yogeshwar Dutt (IND)
