= Borislav Novachkov =

Bulgarian American freestyle wrestler (born 1989)

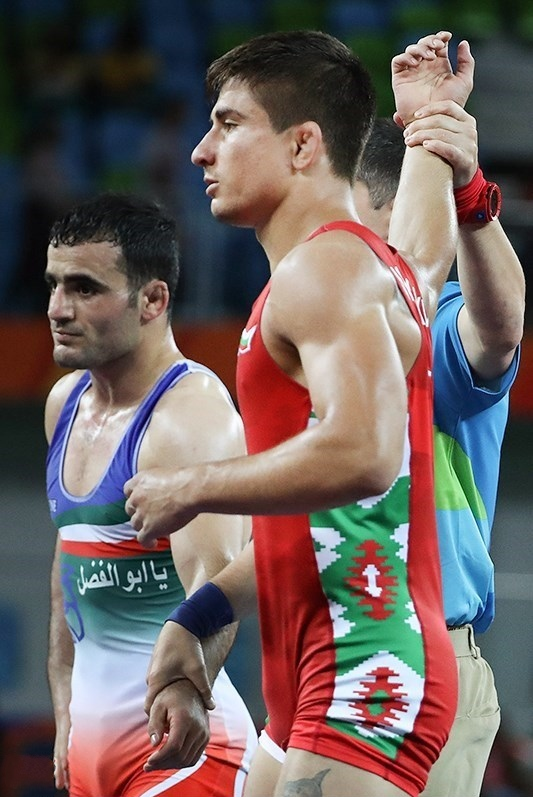
- Novachkov (right) at the 2016 Olympics

Personal information
- Nationality: (Bulgaria) Bulgarian
- Born: November 29, 1989 (age 36) Radnevo, People's Republic of Bulgaria
- Height: 170 cm (5 ft 7 in)
- Weight: 65 kg (143 lb)

Sport
- Sport: Freestyle wrestling
- Club: CSKA, Sofia; Illinois wrestling club
- Coached by: Valentin Raichev; Mark Perry; Jamill Kelly; Rakhmat Sofiadi
Medal record
Men's freestyle wrestling
Representing Bulgaria
European Wrestling Championships
Silver medal – second place	2017 Novi sad	65 kg
Bronze medal – third place	2014 Vantaa	65 kg
Yasar Dogu Tournament
Silver medal – second place	2015 Istanbul	65 kg
Dan Kolov & Nikola Petrov Tournament
Gold medal – first place	2015 Sofia	65 kg
Gold medal – first place	2017 Russe	65 kg
Silver medal – second place	2014 Sofia	65 kg
Silver medal – second place	2016 Sofia	65 kg
Collegiate Wrestling
Representing the Cal Poly Mustangs
NCAA Division I Championships
Silver medal – second place	2011 Philadelphia	141 lb
Bronze medal – third place	2012 St. Louis	141 lb

Borislav Novachkov (Bulgarian: Борислав Новачков; born 29 November 1989) is a Bulgarian American freestyle wrestler. Competing for Bulgaria in the 65 kg division he won a bronze medal at the 2014 European Championships and silver medal at the 2017 European Championships. He also represented Bulgaria at the 2016 Olympics, where he was eliminated in the second bout.

Novachkov qualified for the 2016 Summer Olympics in the 65 kg freestyle class by winning a last-chance qualifier in Turkey. He wrestled collegiately at Cal Poly, where he won Pac-12 titles in 2010 and 2011 and was a three-time NCAA All-American (seventh in 2010, runner-up in 2011, third in 2012). He wrestled for Fremont High School in Sunnyvale, California where he was a two-time CIF California state champion. He also won two Central Coast Section Championships after finishing 2nd as a sophomore. Novachkov moved from Bulgaria to Sunnyvale, California, as an 8th grader, but was enrolled in high school a year early in order to keep him at the same school as his elder brother Filip Novachkov. Filip is also a California State Wrestling Champion and NCAA Qualifier for Cal Poly. Boris holds dual citizenship in the United States and Bulgaria, but chose to compete for his birth country. He beat the reining Olympic champion Toghrul Asgarov of Azerbaijan with a score 13–5 at the 2014 European Championships and won the reining World champion Soslan Ramonov of Russia by fall at the 2015 Yasar Dogu Tournament.

Novachkov studied biokinetics at the Cal Poly, where he was named Male Athlete of the Year in 2011. Together with his brother, he runs the company Bulgarian Muscle, which provides wrestling training and medical services. In 2012 he also started working as an assistant wrestling coach at the University of Illinois Urbana-Champaign. He currently trains at Stanford University at the California Regional Training Center

He now trains and helps run the wrestling program at Odyssey Fitness in the Lake of the Ozarks in Missouri and fights professionally in MMA and is currently 2–1 in his MMA career.
