= Toghrul Asgarov =

Azerbaijani wrestler (born 1992)

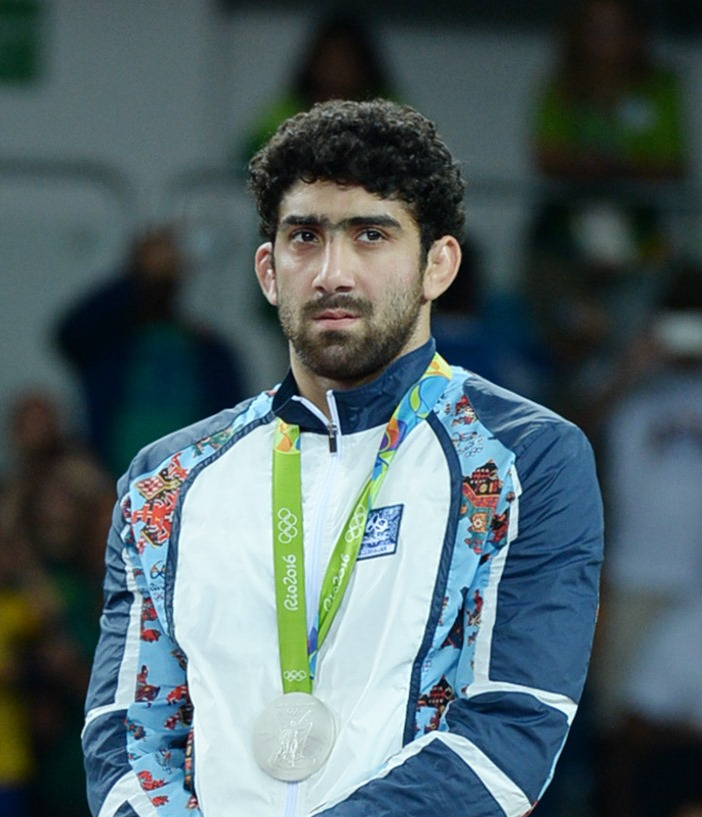
- Asgarov at the 2016 Summer Olympics

Personal information
- Native name: Toğrul Əsgərov
- Full name: Togrul Shahriyar oglu Asgarov
- Nationality: Azerbaijan
- Born: 17 September 1992 (age 33), Ganja, Azerbaijan
- Height: 170 cm (5 ft 7 in)

Sport
- Country: Azerbaijan
- Sport: Wrestling
- Weight class: 65 kg
- Event: Freestyle

Achievements and titles
- Olympic finals: (gold) (2012) (silver) (2016)
- World finals: (silver) (2010) 5th (2015)
- Regional finals: (gold) (2012)
Medal record
Men's freestyle wrestling
Representing Azerbaijan
Olympic Games
Gold medal – first place	2012 London	60 kg
Silver medal – second place	2016 Rio de Janeiro	65 kg
World Championships
Silver medal – second place	2010 Moscow	55 kg
World Cup
Bronze medal – third place	2015 Los Angeles	65 kg
European Games
Gold medal – first place	2015 Baku	65 kg
European Championships
Gold medal – first place	2012 Belgrade	60 kg
World Juniors Championships
Gold medal – first place	2011 Bucharest	60 kg
Silver medal – second place	2010 Budapest	55 kg
European Juniors Championships
Gold medal – first place	2010 Samokov	55 kg
World Juniors Cup
Gold medal – first place	2011 Plauen	60 kg
European Cadets Championships
Gold medal – first place	2009 Zrenjanin	54 kg
Gold medal – first place	2008 Daugavpils	46 kg

Toghrul Shahriyar oghlu Asgarov (Azerbaijani: Toğrul Əsgərov; born on September 17, 1992, Ganja, Azerbaijan) is an Azerbaijani wrestler. He is an Olympic and European champion in freestyle wrestling.

In 2012 Summer Olympics Toghrul Asgarov won Olympic wrestling gold medal in men's 60-kilogram freestyle, beating Besik Kudukhov of Russia by a score of (1–0, 5–0).

In May 2017, he was disqualified for one year due to the doping rules violation (higenamine).
