= Frank Chamizo =

Cuban-Italian freestyle wrestler (born 1992)

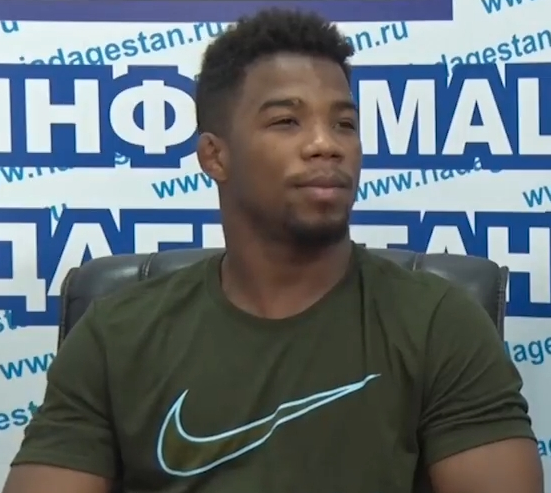
- Chamizo in 2017

Personal information
- Full name: Frank Chamizo Marquez
- Nationality: Cuban/Italian
- Born: 10 July 1992 (age 34) Matanzas, Cuba
- Home town: Ostia, Italy
- Height: 1.70 m (5 ft 7 in)
- Weight: 74 kg (163 lb)

Sport
- Country: Cuba; Italy (since 2013)
- Sport: Wrestling
- Weight class: 74 kg
- Event: Freestyle
- Club: Esercito Italiano; Gamid Gamidov wrestling club (formerly)
- Coached by: Filiberto Delgado (Cuba); Gaidar Gaidarov (Russia)
Medal record
Men's freestyle wrestling
Representing Italy
Olympic Games
Bronze medal – third place	2016 Rio de Janeiro	65 kg
World Championships
Gold medal – first place	2015 Las Vegas	65 kg
Gold medal – first place	2017 Paris	70 kg
Silver medal – second place	2019 Nur-Sultan	74 kg
Disqualified	2022 Belgrade	74 kg
European Championships
Gold medal – first place	2016 Riga	65 kg
Gold medal – first place	2017 Novi Sad	70 kg
Gold medal – first place	2019 Bucharest	74 kg
Gold medal – first place	2020 Rome	74 kg
Silver medal – second place	2022 Budapest	74 kg
Silver medal – second place	2023 Zagreb	74 kg
Bronze medal – third place	2018 Kaspiysk	74 kg
Bronze medal – third place	2021 Warsaw	74 kg
Bronze medal – third place	2024 Bucharest	79 kg
Individual World Cup
Silver medal – second place	2020 Belgrade	74 kg
European Games
Silver medal – second place	2015 Baku	65 kg
Mediterranean Games
Gold medal – first place	2018 Tarragona	74 kg
Italian National Championships
Gold medal – first place	2017 Ostia	70 kg
Representing Cuba
World Championships
Bronze medal – third place	2010 Moscow	55 kg
Pan American Championships
Gold medal – first place	2010 Monterrey	55 kg

Frank Chamizo Marquez (born 10 July 1992) is a Cuban-Italian freestyle wrestler who competes at 74 kilograms. Starting his career in Cuba, Chamizo became a World Cup champion, World Championship medalist, and Pan American champion at 55 kilograms in 2010 and 2011 before immigrating to Italy in 2011. Since then, Chamizo became the most successful Italian wrestler of all time, winning two World Championships (in 2015 at 65kg and 2017 at 70kg, plus a silver medal in 2019), an Olympic bronze medal in 2016, an Individual World Cup silver medal, a European Games silver medal, four European Championships, and others. He also holds wins over a record 12 World and Olympic champions.

Chamizo is known for his rivalry with seven-time Olympic and World champion Jordan Burroughs, against whom he has gone 2–4, but winning the last match.

== Personal life ==
Chamizo had a trying childhood. He grew up in poverty and was raised by his grandmother because both his parents lived abroad. He began wrestling at age seven after walking into a wrestling facility out of curiosity. The Cuban government eventually recognized his talent and helped him attend a secondary school where he could continue wrestling. In addition to his native Spanish, Chamizo is fluent in Italian and can also speak English.

== Career in Cuba ==
In 2010, Chamizo won a world bronze medal for Cuba; he was only 18 at the time. The next year, he returned to the world championships, where he placed 12th. After the 2011 World Wrestling Championships, however, Cuba's wrestling federation suspended him for two years for alleged difficulties with weight management. At a crossroads, he moved to Italy, where he would gain citizenship due to his marriage to fellow wrestler Dalma Caneva.

== Career in Italy ==
In 2015, Chamizo made his world debut for Italy and won a gold medal. Before then, no Italian had won a world or Olympic freestyle wrestling gold medal since 1980.

From there, Chamizo won three more world-level medals, including a bronze medal at the 2016 Summer Olympics and a gold medal at the 2017 world competition. Overall, Chamizo won four world-level medals for Italy and two world-level championships.

At the 2022 World Wrestling Championships in Belgrade, Serbia, he won the bronze medal by defeating Soner Demirtaş 5–3 in the men's freestyle 74 kg third-place match, but his medal was canceled due to doping and given to Demirtaş. He was only suspended for three months.

He won the silver medal at the 2023 European Wrestling Championships in Zagreb, Croatia, losing 3–1 to Tajmuraz Salkazanov of Slovakia in the men's freestyle 74 kg final match. He reached the final by defeating Dzhabrail Gadzhiev of Azerbaijan 9–4 in the second round, Soner Demirtaş 8–6 in the quarterfinals, and Ali-Pasha Umarpashaev of Bulgaria 9–0 in the semifinals.

Chamizo competed at the 2024 European Wrestling Olympic Qualification Tournament in Baku, Azerbaijan hoping to qualify for the 2024 Summer Olympics in Paris, France. He was eliminated in his fourth match and he did not qualify for the Olympics due to controversial judging. Several days later Chamizo claimed he was offered a bribe of 300 thousand dollars to deliberately lose a match to Turan Bayramov, an offer that he rejected. Weeks after the tournament, the refereeing body that officiated the match were suspended by the UWW, however, the result could not be changed. Still, he qualified for the Olympics when spots were reallocated after Russian and Belarusian wrestlers were declared ineligible.

== Freestyle record ==
Freestyle matches
Res.	Record	Opponent	Score	Date	Event	Location
2023 World Championships at 74 kg
Loss	160-30	(Japan) Daichi Takatani	2-7	29–30 March 2022	2023 World Wrestling Championships	Belgrade, Serbia
2023 European Championships at (silver) 74 kg
Loss	160-29	(Slovakia) Tajmuraz Salkazanov	1-3	29–30 March 2022	2022 European Wrestling Championships	Zagreb, Croatia
Win	160-28	(Bulgaria) Ali-Pasha Umarpashaev	9-0	29–30 March 2022	2022 European Wrestling Championships	Zagreb, Croatia
Win	159–28	(Turkey) Soner Demirtaş	8-6	29–30 March 2022	2022 European Wrestling Championships	Zagreb, Croatia
Win	158–28	(Azerbaijan) Khadzhimurad Gadzhiyev	9-4	29–30 March 2022	2022 European Wrestling Championships	Zagreb, Croatia
2022 World Championships at (bronze) (stripped) 74 kg
Win	157–28	(Turkey) Soner Demirtaş	5-3	29–30 March 2022	2022 World Wrestling Championships	Belgrade, Serbia
Loss	156–28	(Slovakia) Tajmuraz Salkazanov	0-3	29–30 March 2022	2022 World Wrestling Championships	Belgrade, Serbia
Win	156–27	(Serbia) Khetag Tsabolov	6-3	29–30 March 2022	2022 World Wrestling Championships	Belgrade, Serbia
Win	155–27	(South Korea) Lee Seung-bong	11-4	29–30 March 2022	2022 World Wrestling Championships	Belgrade, Serbia
Win	154–27	(Georgia (country)) Giorgi Sulava	14-8	29–30 March 2022	2022 World Wrestling Championships	Belgrade, Serbia
2022 European Championships (silver) at 74 kg
Loss	153–27	(Slovakia) Tajmuraz Salkazanov	7–5	29–30 March 2022	2022 European Continental Championships	Budapest, Hungary
Win	153–26	(Armenia) Hrayr Alikhanyan	7–1	29–30 March 2022	2022 European Continental Championships	Budapest, Hungary
Win	152–26	(Turkey) Soner Demirtaş	WO (5–0)	29–30 March 2022	2022 European Continental Championships	Budapest, Hungary
Win	151–26	(Georgia (country)) Giorgi Sulava	10–2	29–30 March 2022	2022 European Continental Championships	Budapest, Hungary
2020 Summer Olympics 5th at 74 kg
Loss	150–26	(United States) Kyle Dake	0–5	5–6 August 2021	2020 Summer Olympics	Tokyo, Japan
Loss	150–25	(Belarus) Magomedkhabib Kadimagomedov	7–9	5–6 August 2021	2020 Summer Olympics	Tokyo, Japan
Win	150–24	(Azerbaijan) Turan Bayramov	3–1	5–6 August 2021	2020 Summer Olympics	Tokyo, Japan
Win	149–24	(Georgia (country)) Avtandil Kentchadze	5–1	5–6 August 2021	2020 Summer Olympics	Tokyo, Japan
2021 Poland Open (silver) at 74 kg
Loss		(Iran) Mostafa Hosseinkhani	INJ	9 June 2021	2021 Poland Open	Warsaw, Poland
Win	148–24	(Ukraine) Semen Radulov	5–4	9 June 2021	2021 Poland Open	Warsaw, Poland
Win	147–24	(Kazakhstan) Daniyar Kaisanov	2–0	9 June 2021	2021 Poland Open	Warsaw, Poland
Win	146–24	(Germany) Lucas Kahnt	7–2	9 June 2021	2021 Poland Open	Warsaw, Poland
2021 European Championships (bronze) at 74 kg
Win	145–24	(Russia) Razambek Zhamalov	5–1	19–21 April 2021	2021 European Continental Championships	Warsaw, Poland
Win	144–24	(Georgia (country)) Avtandil Kentchadze	8–2	19–21 April 2021	2021 European Continental Championships	Warsaw, Poland
Win	143–24	(Switzerland) Marc Dietsche	TF 12–1	19–21 April 2021	2021 European Continental Championships	Warsaw, Poland
Loss	142–24	(Slovakia) Tajmuraz Salkazanov	2–6	19–21 April 2021	2021 European Continental Championships	Warsaw, Poland
Win	142–23	(Germany) Daniel Sartakov	4–0	19–21 April 2021	2021 European Continental Championships	Warsaw, Poland
2021 Matteo Pellicone Ranking Series (gold) at 74 kg
Win	141–23	(United States) Jordan Burroughs	3–2	7 March 2021	Matteo Pellicone Ranking Series 2021	Rome, Italy
Win	140–23	(Puerto Rico) Franklin Gómez	6–0	7 March 2021	Matteo Pellicone Ranking Series 2021	Rome, Italy
Win	139–23	(San Marino) Malik Amine	13–8	7 March 2021	Matteo Pellicone Ranking Series 2021	Rome, Italy
Win	138–23	(Kazakhstan) Nurkozha Kaipanov	6–0	7 March 2021	Matteo Pellicone Ranking Series 2021	Rome, Italy
2020 Individual World Cup (silver) at 74 kg
Loss	137–23	(Russia) Razambek Zhamalov	2–4	16–18 December 2020	2020 Individual World Cup	Belgrade, Serbia
Win	137–22	(Belarus) Azamat Nurykau	TF 10–0	16–18 December 2020	2020 Individual World Cup	Belgrade, Serbia
Win	136–22	(Armenia) Hrayr Alikhanyan	8–2	16–18 December 2020	2020 Individual World Cup	Belgrade, Serbia
Win	135–22	(Turkey) Fazlı Eryılmaz	Fall	16–18 December 2020	2020 Individual World Cup	Belgrade, Serbia
Win	134–22	(Guinea-Bissau) Augusto Midana	8–0	16–18 December 2020	2020 Individual World Cup	Belgrade, Serbia
Loss	133–22	(United States) Kyle Dake	3–4	25 July 2020	FloWrestling: Dake vs. Chamizo	(United States) Austin, Texas
2020 European Championships (gold) at 74 kg
Win	133–21	(Russia) Magomedrasul Gazimagomedov	5–3	16 February 2020	2020 European Continental Championships	Rome, Italy
Win	132–21	(Kazakhstan) Murad Kuramagomedov	6–0	16 February 2020	2020 European Continental Championships	Rome, Italy
Win	131–21	(Moldova) Valentin Borzin	8–0	16 February 2020	2020 European Continental Championships	Rome, Italy
Win	130–21	(Azerbaijan) Khadzhimurad Gadzhiyev	Fall	16 February 2020	2020 European Continental Championships	Rome, Italy
2019 World Championships (silver) at 74 kg
Loss	129–21	(Russia) Zaurbek Sidakov	2–5	21 September 2019	2019 World Championships	Nur-Sultan, Kazakhstan
Win	129–20	(France) Zelimkhan Khadjiev	4–1	21 September 2019	2019 World Championships	Nur-Sultan, Kazakhstan
Win	128–20	(Kazakhstan) Daniyar Kaisanov	Fall	21 September 2019	2019 World Championships	Nur-Sultan, Kazakhstan
Win	127–20	(South Korea) Lee Seung-chul	10–2	21 September 2019	2019 World Championships	Nur-Sultan, Kazakhstan
Win	126–20	(Switzerland) Marc Dietsche	TF 10–0	21 September 2019	2019 World Championships	Nur-Sultan, Kazakhstan
2019 Yaşar Doğu (silver) at 74 kg
Loss		(United States) Jordan Burroughs	INJ	11–14 July 2019	2019 Yaşar Doğu Ranking Series	Istanbul, Turkey
Win	125–20	(Kazakhstan) Alibek Abdikassymov	10–5	11–14 July 2019	2019 Yaşar Doğu Ranking Series	Istanbul, Turkey
Win	124–20	(Turkey) Fazlı Eryılmaz	10–6	11–14 July 2019	2019 Yaşar Doğu Ranking Series	Istanbul, Turkey
2019 Matteo Pellicone Memorial (gold) at 74 kg
Win	123–20	(Kazakhstan) Daniyar Kaisanov	6–4	23–25 May 2019	2019 Sassari City Matteo Pellicone Memorial	Sassari, Italy
Win	122–20	(Russia) Khetag Tsabolov	5–4	23–25 May 2019	2019 Sassari City Matteo Pellicone Memorial	Sassari, Italy
Win	121–20	(Belarus) Andrei Karpach	8–0	23–25 May 2019	2019 Sassari City Matteo Pellicone Memorial	Sassari, Italy
Win	120–20	(United States) Isaac Collier	TF 11–0	23–25 May 2019	2019 Sassari City Matteo Pellicone Memorial	Sassari, Italy
2019 European Championships (gold) at 74 kg
Win	119–20	(France) Zelimkhan Khadjiev	8–0	10 April 2019	2019 European Continental Championships	Bucharest, Romania
Win	118–20	(Azerbaijan) Khadzhimurad Gadzhiyev	6–2	10 April 2019	2019 European Continental Championships	Bucharest, Romania
Win	117–20	(Bulgaria) Miroslav Kirov	5–0	10 April 2019	2019 European Continental Championships	Bucharest, Romania
Win	116–20	(Russia) Timur Bizhoev	3–0	10 April 2019	2019 European Continental Championships	Bucharest, Romania
2019 Dan Kolov - Nikola Petrov (bronze) at 74 kg
Win	115–20	(Bulgaria) Ali-Pasha Umarpashaev	TF 13–2	28 February – 3 March 2019	2019 Dan Kolov - Nikola Petrov Ranking Series	Ruse, Bulgaria
Loss	114–20	(United States) Jordan Burroughs	2–9	28 February – 3 March 2019	2019 Dan Kolov - Nikola Petrov Ranking Series	Ruse, Bulgaria
Win	114–19	(Belarus) Azamat Nurykau	TF 12–2	28 February – 3 March 2019	2019 Dan Kolov - Nikola Petrov Ranking Series	Ruse, Bulgaria
2018 World Championships 5th at 74 kg
Loss	113–19	(United States) Jordan Burroughs	4–4	20–21 October 2018	2018 World Championships	Budapest, Hungary
Loss	113–18	(Russia) Zaurbek Sidakov	2–3	20–21 October 2018	2018 World Championships	Budapest, Hungary
Win	113–17	(Kazakhstan) Bolat Sakayev	6–1	20–21 October 2018	2018 World Championships	Budapest, Hungary
Win	112–17	(South Korea) Gong Byung-min	5–1	20–21 October 2018	2018 World Championships	Budapest, Hungary
Win	111–17	(Tajikistan) Gamid Dzhalilov	9–0	20–21 October 2018	2018 World Championships	Budapest, Hungary
2018 Dmitry Korkin Memorial International (silver) at 74 kg
Loss	110–17	(Russia) Nikita Suchkov	3–5	6–8 September 2018	2018 Dmitry Korkin Memorial International	Yakutsk, Russia
Win	110–16	(Russia) Israil Kasumov	14–11	6–8 September 2018	2018 Dmitry Korkin Memorial International	Yakutsk, Russia
Win	109–16	(Romania) Artiom Postica	TF 12–2	6–8 September 2018	2018 Dmitry Korkin Memorial International	Yakutsk, Russia
Win	108–16	(Russia) Alisher Usmanov	6–4	6–8 September 2018	2018 Dmitry Korkin Memorial International	Yakutsk, Russia
2018 Yaşar Doğu (gold) at 74 kg
Win	107–16	(United States) Jordan Burroughs	10–10	27–29 July 2018	2018 Yaşar Doğu Ranking Series	Istanbul, Turkey
Win	106–16	(Iran) Saeid Dadashpourkerikalaei	6–0	27–29 July 2018	2018 Yaşar Doğu Ranking Series	Istanbul, Turkey
Win	105–16	(Turkey) Yakup Gör	4–0	27–29 July 2018	2018 Yaşar Doğu Ranking Series	Istanbul, Turkey
Win	104–16	(Kazakhstan) Nurlan Bekzhanov	6–0	27–29 July 2018	2018 Yaşar Doğu Ranking Series	Istanbul, Turkey
2018 Mediterranean Games (gold) at 74 kg
Win	103–16	(Egypt) Samy Moustafa	PP	24–27 June 2018	2018 Mediterranean Games	Tarragone, Spain
Win	102–16	(Turkey) Muhammet Demir	PP	24–27 June 2018	2018 Mediterranean Games	Tarragone, Spain
Win	101–16	(Malta) David Galea	TF	24–27 June 2018	2018 Mediterranean Games	Tarragone, Spain
Loss	100–16	(United States) Jordan Burroughs	5–8	17 May 2018	2018 Beat The Streets: Team USA vs. The World All-Stars	(United States) New York City, New York
2018 European Championships (bronze) at 74 kg
Win	100–15	(Slovakia) Achsarbek Gulajev	TF 10–0	5 May 2018	2018 European Continental Championships	Kaspiysk, Russia
Loss	99–15	(Turkey) Soner Demirtaş	3–4	5 May 2018	2018 European Continental Championships	Kaspiysk, Russia
Win	99–14	(Russia) Khetag Tsabolov	Fall	5 May 2018	2018 European Continental Championships	Kaspiysk, Russia
Win	98–14	(Georgia (country)) Avtandil Kentchadze	9–4	5 May 2018	2018 European Continental Championships	Kaspiysk, Russia
2018 Dan Kolov - Nikola Petrov (gold) at 74 kg
Win	97–14	(Russia) Magomedkhabib Kadimagomedov	10–6	22–27 March 2018	2018 Dan Kolov - Nikola Petrov Ranking Series	Sofia, Bulgaria
Win	96–14	(Turkey) Muhammet Akdeniz	Fall	22–27 March 2018	2018 Dan Kolov - Nikola Petrov Ranking Series	Sofia, Bulgaria
Win	95–14	(Bulgaria) Dzhemal Ali	4–2	22–27 March 2018	2018 Dan Kolov - Nikola Petrov Ranking Series	Sofia, Bulgaria
2018 Ukrainian Memorial (gold) at 74 kg
Win	94–14	(Puerto Rico) Franklin Gómez	4–0	23–25 February 2018	XXII Outstanding Ukrainian Wrestlers and Coaches Memorial	Kyiv, Ukraine
Win	93–14	(Slovakia) Achsarbek Gulajev	5–0	23–25 February 2018	XXII Outstanding Ukrainian Wrestlers and Coaches Memorial	Kyiv, Ukraine
Win	92–14	(Japan) Taro Umebayashi	6–1	23–25 February 2018	XXII Outstanding Ukrainian Wrestlers and Coaches Memorial	Kyiv, Ukraine
Win	91–14	(Lithuania) Andrius Mazeika	TF 10–0	23–25 February 2018	XXII Outstanding Ukrainian Wrestlers and Coaches Memorial	Kyiv, Ukraine
Win	90–14	(Azerbaijan) Gadzhimurad Omarov	6–4	23–25 February 2018	XXII Outstanding Ukrainian Wrestlers and Coaches Memorial	Kyiv, Ukraine
2017 Alans International 5th at 70 kg
Loss	89–14	(Russia) Zaurbek Sidakov	6–9	17–25 November 2017	2017 Alans International	Vladikavkaz, Russia
Win	89–13	(Georgia (country)) Konstantin Khabalashvili	9–6	17–25 November 2017	2017 Alans International	Vladikavkaz, Russia
Win	88–13	(Russia) Magomed Muslimov	TF 11–1	17–25 November 2017	2017 Alans International	Vladikavkaz, Russia
2017 World Championships (gold) at 70 kg
Win	87–13	(United States) James Green	8–0	26 August 2017	2017 World Championships	Paris, France
Win	86–13	(Turkey) Yakup Gor	5–2	26 August 2017	2017 World Championships	Paris, France
Win	85–13	(Kazakhstan) Akzhurek Tanatarov	TF 12–0	26 August 2017	2017 World Championships	Paris, France
Win	84–13	(Kyrgyzstan) Elaman Dogdurbek Uulu	TF 12–0	26 August 2017	2017 World Championships	Paris, France
Win	83–13	(Uzbekistan) Ikhtiyor Navruzov	9–5	26 August 2017	2017 World Championships	Paris, France
2017 Ion Cornianu & Ladislau Simon (gold) at 70 kg
Win	82–13	(Ukraine) Andriy Kviatkovskyi	3–0	22–23 July 2017	2017 Ion Cornianu & Ladislau Simon Memorial International	Bucharest, Romania
Win	81–13	(Turkey) Enes Uslu	Fall	22–23 July 2017	2017 Ion Cornianu & Ladislau Simon Memorial International	Bucharest, Romania
Win	80–13	(Moldova) Andrei Zugrav	Fall	22–23 July 2017	2017 Ion Cornianu & Ladislau Simon Memorial International	Bucharest, Romania
Win	79–13	(Romania) Maxim Fricatel	TF 10–0	22–23 July 2017	2017 Ion Cornianu & Ladislau Simon Memorial International	Bucharest, Romania
2017 Ali Aliev Memorial International (gold) at 70 kg
Win	78–13	(Mongolia) Ganzorigiin Mandakhnaran	6–2	6–10 July 2017	2017 Ali Aliev Memorial International	Vladikavkaz, Russia
Win	77–13	(Russia) Murad Kuramagomedov	12–5	6–10 July 2017	2017 Ali Aliev Memorial International	Vladikavkaz, Russia
Win	76–13	(Russia) Alibek Akbaev	TF 11–0	6–10 July 2017	2017 Ali Aliev Memorial International	Vladikavkaz, Russia
Win	75–13	(United States) Jordan Oliver	7–6	17 May 2017	2017 Beat The Streets: Times Square	(United States) New York City, New York
2017 European Championships (gold) at 70 kg
Win	74–13	(Poland) Magomedmurad Gadzhiev	4–3	2–7 May 2017	2017 European Continental Championships	Novi Sad, Serbia
Win	73–13	(Romania) Adrian Moise	TF 10–0	2–7 May 2017	2017 European Continental Championships	Novi Sad, Serbia
Win	72–13	(Moldova) Mihai Sava	TF 10–0	2–7 May 2017	2017 European Continental Championships	Novi Sad, Serbia
Win	71–13	(Azerbaijan) Ruslan Dibirgadjiyev	6–0	2–7 May 2017	2017 European Continental Championships	Novi Sad, Serbia
2017 Dan Kolov - Nikola Petrov 7th at 70 kg
Loss	70–13	(Russia) Magomedrasul Gazimagomedov	2–4	8–9 April 2017	2017 Dan Kolov - Nikola Petrov Ranking Series	Ruse, Bulgaria
Win	70–12	(India) Vikas	TF 10–0	8–9 April 2017	2017 Dan Kolov - Nikola Petrov Ranking Series	Ruse, Bulgaria
2017 Italian Nationals (gold) at 70 kg
Win	69–13	(Italy) Gianluca Talamo	TF 11–1	5 March 2017	2017 Italian National Championships	Ostia, Italy
Win	68–13	(Italy) Massimiliano Chiara	Fall	5 March 2017	2017 Italian National Championships	Ostia, Italy
Win	67–13	(Italy) Giovanni Rogolino	TF 13–2	5 March 2017	2017 Italian National Championships	Ostia, Italy
Win	66–13	(Italy) Davide Turco	TF 15–4	5 March 2017	2017 Italian National Championships	Ostia, Italy
Win	65–13	(Italy) Davide Giordano	TF 14–0	5 March 2017	2017 Italian National Championships	Ostia, Italy
2017 Mälarcupen (gold) at 74 kg
Win	64–13	(Sweden) Khalid Kerchiev	TF 10–0	26 February 2017	2017 Mälarcupen Fristil	Västerås, Sweden
Win	63–12	(Sweden) Mohaydin Rahimi	Fall	26 February 2017	2017 Mälarcupen Fristil	Västerås, Sweden
Win	62–12	(Sweden) Asef Khierkha	Fall	26 February 2017	2017 Mälarcupen Fristil	Västerås, Sweden
2016 Summer Olympics (bronze) at 65 kg
Win	61–12	(United States) Frank Molinaro	5–3	21 August 2016	2016 Summer Olympics	Rio de Janeiro, Brazil
Loss	60–12	(Azerbaijan) Toghrul Asgarov	4–7	21 August 2016	2016 Summer Olympics	Rio de Janeiro, Brazil
Win	60–11	(Georgia (country)) Zurabi Iakobishvili	4–3	21 August 2016	2016 Summer Olympics	Rio de Janeiro, Brazil
Win	59–11	(Armenia) David Safaryan	3–1	21 August 2016	2016 Summer Olympics	Rio de Janeiro, Brazil
2016 European Championships (gold) at 65 kg
Win	58–11	(Turkey) Mustafa Kaya	8–6	8 March 2016	2016 European Continental Championships	Riga, Latvia
Win	57–11	(Azerbaijan) Aghahuseyn Mustafayev	TF 11–1	8 March 2016	2016 European Continental Championships	Riga, Latvia
Win	56–11	(Ukraine) Semen Radulov	TF 17–4	8 March 2016	2016 European Continental Championships	Riga, Latvia
Win	55–11	(Latvia) Eduards Frolos	TF 10–0	8 March 2016	2016 European Continental Championships	Riga, Latvia
Win	54–11	(Switzerland) Steven Graf	TF 10–0	8 March 2016	2016 European Continental Championships	Riga, Latvia
2016 Alexander Medved Prizes (silver) at 65 kg
Loss	53–11	(Russia) Soslan Ramonov	7–8	18–19 February 2016	2016 Medved Cup and Pahlavani	Minsk, Belarus
Win	53–10	(Belarus) Aliaksandr Kontoyeu	5–4	18–19 February 2016	2016 Medved Cup and Pahlavani	Minsk, Belarus
Win	52–10	(United States) Logan Stieber	10–8	18–19 February 2016	2016 Medved Cup and Pahlavani	Minsk, Belarus
Win	51–10	(Kazakhstan) Dauren Zhumagaziyev	TF 12–2	18–19 February 2016	2016 Medved Cup and Pahlavani	Minsk, Belarus
Win	50–10	(Russia) Gamlet Ramonov	TF 12–2	18–19 February 2016	2016 Medved Cup and Pahlavani	Minsk, Belarus
2015 World Championships (gold) at 65 kg
Win	49–10	(Uzbekistan) Ikhtiyor Navruzov	4–3	12 September 2015	2015 World Championships	(United States) Las Vegas, Nevada
Win	48–10	(Iran) Ahmad Mohammadi	Fall	12 September 2015	2015 World Championships	(United States) Las Vegas, Nevada
Win	47–10	(Azerbaijan) Toghrul Asgarov	10–5	12 September 2015	2015 World Championships	(United States) Las Vegas, Nevada
Win	46–10	(North Korea) Kim Ju-Song	5–2	12 September 2015	2015 World Championships	(United States) Las Vegas, Nevada
Win	45–10	(Poland) Magomedmurad Gadzhiev	4–3	12 September 2015	2015 World Championships	(United States) Las Vegas, Nevada
2015 Poland Open (gold) at 65 kg
Win	44–10	(Romania) George Bucur	3–3	24–26 July 2015	2015 Ziolkowski & Pytlasinski Memorial International	Warsaw, Poland
Win	43–10	(Ukraine) Andriy Kviatkovskyi	9–4	24–26 July 2015	2015 Ziolkowski & Pytlasinski Memorial International	Warsaw, Poland
Win	42–10	(Russia) Rashid Mostoi	TF 12–2	24–26 July 2015	2015 Ziolkowski & Pytlasinski Memorial International	Warsaw, Poland
Win	41–10	(Russia) Soslan Ramonov	4–3	24–26 July 2015	2015 Ziolkowski & Pytlasinski Memorial International	Warsaw, Poland
2015 Spain Grand Prix (silver) at 70 kg
Loss	40–10	(United States) James Green	5–5	11 July 2015	2015 Grand Prix of Spain	Madrid, Spain
Win	40–9	(Canada) Cruiz Manning	6–3	11 July 2015	2015 Grand Prix of Spain	Madrid, Spain
Win	39–9	(Spain) Airam Gonzalez	TF 10–0	11 July 2015	2015 Grand Prix of Spain	Madrid, Spain
2015 European Games (silver) at 65 kg
Loss	38–9	(Azerbaijan) Toghrul Asgarov	Fall	17 June 2015	2015 European Games	Baku, Azerbaijan
Win	38–8	(Romania) George Bucur	5–4	17 June 2015	2015 European Games	Baku, Azerbaijan
Win	37–8	(Turkey) Mustafa Kaya	10–7	17 June 2015	2015 European Games	Baku, Azerbaijan
Win	36–8	(Georgia (country)) Avtandil Kentchadze	4–4	17 June 2015	2015 European Games	Baku, Azerbaijan
2015 Copa Italia II (gold) at 65 kg
Win	35–8	(Italy) Gianluca Talamo	Fall	11 April 2015	2015 Segunda Fase Copa Italia	Naples, Italy
Win	34–8	(Italy) Giuseppe Cristiano	TF 10–0	11 April 2015	2015 Segunda Fase Copa Italia	Naples, Italy
Win	33–8	(Italy) Saverio Borsellino	Fall	11 April 2015	2015 Segunda Fase Copa Italia	Naples, Italy
2015 U23 European Championships (gold) at 65 kg
Win	32–8	(Georgia (country)) Zurabi Iakobishvili	6–0	24–29 March 2015	2015 U23 European Championships	Wałbrzych, Poland
Win	31–8	(Azerbaijan) Magomed Muslimov	12–11	24–29 March 2015	2015 U23 European Championships	Wałbrzych, Poland
Win	30–8	(Moldova) Maxim Perpelia	TF 10–0	24–29 March 2015	2015 U23 European Championships	Wałbrzych, Poland
Win	29–8	(Hungary) Norbert Lukacs	TF 10–0	24–29 March 2015	2015 U23 European Championships	Wałbrzych, Poland
Win	28–8	(Switzerland) Randy Vock	TF 10–0	24–29 March 2015	2015 U23 European Championships	Wałbrzych, Poland
2015 Alexander Medved Prizes 7th at 65 kg
Loss	27–8	(Mongolia) Ganzorigiin Mandakhnaran	3–9	5–7 March 2015	2015 Medved Cup and Pahlavani	Minsk, Belarus
Loss	27–7	(Russia) Magomed Kurbanaliev	3–5	5–7 March 2015	2015 Medved Cup and Pahlavani	Minsk, Belarus
Win	27–6	(Belarus) Aleksander Pauliachenko	TF 13–2	5–7 March 2015	2015 Medved Cup and Pahlavani	Minsk, Belarus
Win	26–6	(Georgia (country)) Malkhaz Zarkua	10–2	5–7 March 2015	2015 Medved Cup and Pahlavani	Minsk, Belarus
2014 Kunayev D.A. International (bronze) at 65 kg
Loss	25–6	(Mongolia) Ganzorigiin Mandakhnaran	2–5	26–27 July 2014	2014 Kunayev D.A. International	Taraz, Kazakhstan
Win	20–5	(Georgia (country)) Malkhaz Zarkua	6–1	26–27 July 2014	2014 Kunayev D.A. International	Taraz, Kazakhstan
Win	19–5	(Kazakhstan) Kanat Mussabekov	TF 12–2	26–27 July 2014	2014 Kunayev D.A. International	Taraz, Kazakhstan
2014 Spain Grand Prix (gold) at 65 kg
Win	18–5	(United States) Aaron Pico	4–2	5 July 2014	2014 Grand Prix of Spain	Madrid, Spain
Win	17–5	(Hungary) Istvan Nemeth	TF 10–0	5 July 2014	2014 Grand Prix of Spain	Madrid, Spain
Win	16–5	(Italy) Gianluca Coco	TF 14–1	5 July 2014	2014 Grand Prix of Spain	Madrid, Spain
2014 Sassari City 8th at 65 kg
Loss	15–5	(Armenia) David Safaryan	6–7	31 May 2014	2014 Sassari City Tournament	Sassari, Italy
Win	15–4	(Italy) Gianluca Coco	TF 12–2	31 May 2014	2014 Sassari City Tournament	Sassari, Italy
2014 Ali Aliev Memorial International (bronze) at 65 kg
Win	14–4	(Armenia) Narek Sirunyan	8–0	24–25 May 2014	2014 Ali Aliev Memorial International	Makhachkala, Russia
Loss	13–4	(Ukraine) Tital Dshafaroyan		24–25 May 2014	2014 Ali Aliev Memorial International	Makhachkala, Russia
Win	13–3	(Uzbekistan) Ikhtiyor Navruzov		24–25 May 2014	2014 Ali Aliev Memorial International	Makhachkala, Russia
Win	12–3	(Armenia) S. Hovsepyan	TF 12–2	24–25 May 2014	2014 Ali Aliev Memorial International	Makhachkala, Russia
2014 Yaşar Doğu (gold) at 65 kg
Win	11–3	(Azerbaijan) Magomed Muslimov	8–3	15 February 2014	2014 Yaşar Doğu Ranking Series	Istanbul, Turkey
Win	10–3	(Azerbaijan) Aghahuseyn Mustafayev	10–3	15 February 2014	2014 Yaşar Doğu Ranking Series	Istanbul, Turkey
Win	9–3	(Turkmenistan) Dovletmyrat Orazgylyjov	11–4	15 February 2014	2014 Yaşar Doğu Ranking Series	Istanbul, Turkey
Win	8–3	(Mongolia) Ganzorigiin Mandakhnaran	10–5	15 February 2014	2014 Yaşar Doğu Ranking Series	Istanbul, Turkey
Win	7–3	(Kyrgyzstan) Azat Mirakhimov	10–4	15 February 2014	2014 Yaşar Doğu Ranking Series	Istanbul, Turkey
2011 World Championships 12th at 65 kg
Loss	6–3	(Armenia) Mihran Jaburyan	3–7, 7–0, 2–3	18 September 2011	2011 World Championships	Istanbul, Turkey
Loss	6–2	(Russia) Viktor Lebedev	0–1, 1–1	18 September 2011	2011 World Championships	Istanbul, Turkey
Win	6–1	(Lithuania) Sarunas Jurcys	1–1, 6–0	18 September 2011	2011 World Championships	Istanbul, Turkey
Win	5–1	(India) Rahul Aware	1–2, 7–2, 4–1	18 September 2011	2011 World Championships	Istanbul, Turkey
2010 World Championships (bronze) at 55 kg
Win	4–1	(South Korea) Kim Hyo-Sub	1–0, 2–3, 5–1	10 September 2010	2010 World Championships	Moscow, Russia
Loss	3–1	(Russia) Viktor Lebedev	0–1, 0–1	10 September 2010	2010 World Championships	Moscow, Russia
Win	3–0	(Iran) Hassan Rahimi	1–0, 2–0	10 September 2010	2010 World Championships	Moscow, Russia
Win	2–0	(Ukraine) Serhiy Ratushniy	2–0, 2–0	10 September 2010	2010 World Championships	Moscow, Russia
Win	1–0	(United Kingdom) Krasimir Krastanov	1–1, 3–1	10 September 2010	2010 World Championships	Moscow, Russia

== Awards and honors ==
2019

- (silver) World Championships (74 kg)
- (bronze) Dan Kolov - Nikola Petrov Tournament (74 kg)

2018

- (gold) Yasar Dogu (74 kg)
- (gold) Mediterranean Games (74 kg)
- (bronze) European Championships (74 kg)
- (gold) Dan Kolov - Nikola Petrov Tournament (74 kg)
- (gold) International Ukrainian Tournament (74 kg)

2017

- (gold) World Championships (70 kg)
- (gold) Ion Corneanu & Ladislau Simon Memorial (70 kg)
- (gold) Ali Aliev Tournament (70 kg)
- (gold) European Championships (70 kg)

2016

- (bronze) Olympic Games (65 kg)
- (gold) European Championships (65 kg)
- (silver) Alexander Medved Prizes (65 kg)

2015

- (gold) World Championships (65 kg)
- (gold) Waclaw Ziolkowski Memorial (65 kg)
- (silver) Grand Prix of Spain (70 kg)
- (silver) European Games (65 kg)

2014

- (bronze) International D. A. Kunaev Tournament (65 kg)
- (gold) Grand Prix of Spain (65 kg)
- (bronze) Ali Aliev Tournament (65 kg)
- (gold) Yasar Dogu (65 kg)

2013

- (bronze) Henri Deglane Challenge (66 kg)
- (silver) Grand Prix of Spain (66 kg)

2011

- (gold) World Cup (55 kg)

2010

- (bronze) World Championships (55 kg)
- (gold) Pan American Championships (55 kg)
