= 2019 World Wrestling Championships – Men's freestyle 70 kg =

Men's freestyle 70 kg at the 2019 World Championships
- Venue: Barys Arena
- Dates: 20–21 September 2019
- Competitors: 30 from 30 nations

Medalists
gold medal	David Baev	Russia
silver medal	Nurkozha Kaipanov	Kazakhstan
bronze medal	Magomedmurad Gadzhiev	Poland
bronze medal	Younes Emami	Iran

The men's freestyle 70 kilograms is a competition featured at the 2019 World Wrestling Championships, and was held in Nur-Sultan, Kazakhstan on 20 and 21 September.

This freestyle wrestling competition consists of a single-elimination tournament, with a repechage used to determine the winner of two bronze medals. The two finalists face off for gold and silver medals. Each wrestler who loses to one of the two finalists moves into the repechage, culminating in a pair of bronze medal matches featuring the semifinal losers each facing the remaining repechage opponent from their half of the bracket.

== Results ==
Legend

- F — Won by fall

=== Final ===
Final
David Baev (RUS)	14
Nurkozha Kaipanov (KAZ)	2

=== Top half ===
Round of 32
Haydar Yavuz (TUR)	6
Aghahuseyn Mustafayev (AZE)	10
Magomedmurad Gadzhiev (POL)	4
Ganzorigiin Mandakhnaran (MGL)	2
James Green (USA)	10
Vincent De Marinis (CAN)	0
Karan Mor (IND)	0
Ikhtiyor Navruzov (UZB)	7
Ali-Pasha Umarpashaev (BUL)	5^{F}
Semen Radulov (UKR)	2
Andrei Karpach (BLR)	0
David Baev (RUS)	10
Mihail Sava (MDA)	1
Zurabi Iakobishvili (GEO)	2

Round of 16
Adam Batirov (BRN)	5
Aghahuseyn Mustafayev (AZE)	2
Magomedmurad Gadzhiev (POL)	4
James Green (USA)	3
Ikhtiyor Navruzov (UZB)	7
Ali-Pasha Umarpashaev (BUL)	6
David Baev (RUS)	7
Zurabi Iakobishvili (GEO)	0

Quarterfinals
Adam Batirov (BRN)	3
Magomedmurad Gadzhiev (POL)	3
Ikhtiyor Navruzov (UZB)	5
David Baev (RUS)	11

Semifinals
Magomedmurad Gadzhiev (POL)	2
David Baev (RUS)	5

=== Bottom half ===
Round of 32
Younes Emami (IRI)	11
Eriglent Prizreni (ALB)	0
Cai Zhongcheng (CHN)	4
Elaman Dogdurbek Uulu (KGZ)	9^{F}
Luis Barrios (HON)	0
Kojiro Shiga (JPN)	10
Abdulrahman Ibrahim (QAT)	6^{F}
Brahm Richards (NZL)	0
Han Dae-su (KOR)	10
Lou Hong Yeow (SGP)	0
Jarvis Tarkong (PLW)	0
Nicolae Cojocaru (GBR)	10
Joshua Riley (AUS)	4^{F}
Jacob Ntuyo (UGA)	1

Round of 16
Younes Emami (IRI)	6
Elaman Dogdurbek Uulu (KGZ)	0
Kojiro Shiga (JPN)	10
Abdulrahman Ibrahim (QAT)	0
Han Dae-su (KOR)	2
Nicolae Cojocaru (GBR)	5
Joshua Riley (AUS)	0
Nurkozha Kaipanov (KAZ)	10

Quarterfinals
Younes Emami (IRI)	11
Kojiro Shiga (JPN)	0
Nicolae Cojocaru (GBR)	0
Nurkozha Kaipanov (KAZ)	10

Semifinals
Younes Emami (IRI)	6
Nurkozha Kaipanov (KAZ)	7

=== Repechage ===
Repechage round 1
Andrei Karpach (BLR)	0
Zurabi Iakobishvili (GEO)	5

Repechage round 2
Zurabi Iakobishvili (GEO)	4
Ikhtiyor Navruzov (UZB)	1
Joshua Riley (AUS)	0
Nicolae Cojocaru (GBR)	4^{F}

Bronze medals
Zurabi Iakobishvili (GEO)	2
Magomedmurad Gadzhiev (POL)	3
Nicolae Cojocaru (GBR)	0
Younes Emami (IRI)	8^{F}
