= 2019 European Wrestling Championships – Men's freestyle 70 kg =

The men's freestyle 70 kg is a competition featured at the 2019 European Wrestling Championships, and was held in Bucharest, Romania on April 9 and April 10.

== Medalists ==
Gold	Mustafa Kaya; Turkey
Silver	Aghahuseyn Mustafayev; Azerbaijan
Bronze	Magomedrasul Gazimagomedov; Russia
Bronze	Magomedmurad Gadzhiev; Poland

== Results ==
Legend

- F — Won by fall

=== Main Bracket ===
Round of 16
Mihai Sava (MDA)	4
David Safaryan (ARM)	7
Aghahuseyn Mustafayev (AZE)	4
Magomedrasul Gazimagomedov (RUS)	3
Semen Radulov (UKR)	10
George Koliev (BLR)	3
Evghenii Volcov (ROU)	1
Mustafa Kaya (TUR)	9
Kevin Henkel (GER)	0
Ali Umarpashaev (BUL)	10
Zurabi Iakobishvili (GEO)	0
Magomedmurad Gadzhiev (POL)	7

Quarterfinals
Csaba Vida (HUN)	2
Nicolae Cojocaru (GBR)	12
David Safaryan (ARM)	2
Aghahuseyn Mustafayev (AZE)	12
Semen Radulov (UKR)	4
Mustafa Kaya (TUR)	9
Ali Umarpashaev (BUL)	2
Magomedmurad Gadzhiev (POL)	5

Semifinals
Nicolae Cojocaru (GBR)	0
Aghahuseyn Mustafayev (AZE)	6
Mustafa Kaya (TUR)	6
Magomedmurad Gadzhiev (POL)	6

Final
Aghahuseyn Mustafayev (AZE)	2
Mustafa Kaya (TUR)	6

=== Repechage ===
Repechage round 1
Magomedrasul Gazimagomedov (RUS)	7
David Safaryan (ARM)	1
Evghenii Volcov (ROU)	2
Semen Radulov (UKR)	10

Bronze medal match
Magomedrasul Gazimagomedov (RUS)	11
Nicolae Cojocaru (GBR)	0
Semen Radulov (UKR)	0
Magomedmurad Gadzhiev (POL)	6
