= 2017 World Wrestling Championships – Men's freestyle 70 kg =

Men's freestyle 70 kg at the 2017 World Championships
- Venue: AccorHotels Arena
- Dates: 26 August 2017
- Competitors: 27 from 27 nations

Medalists
gold medal	Frank Chamizo	Italy
silver medal	James Green	United States
bronze medal	Yuhi Fujinami	Japan
bronze medal	Akzhurek Tanatarov	Kazakhstan

The men's freestyle 70 kilograms is a competition featured at the 2017 World Wrestling Championships, and was held in Paris, France on 26 August.

This freestyle wrestling competition consisted of a single-elimination tournament, with a repechage used to determine the winners of two bronze medals.

== Results ==
Legend

- F — Won by fall

=== Final ===
Final
James Green (USA)	0
Frank Chamizo (ITA)	8

=== Top half ===
Round of 32
Ogbonna John (NGR)	0
Adrian Moise (ROU)	4^{F}
Mostafa Hosseinkhani (IRI)	10
Ilman Mukhtarov (FRA)	0
Yuhi Fujinami (JPN)	7^{F}
Gadzhimurad Omarov (AZE)	0
Miroslav Kirov (BUL)	4
Zsombor Gulyás (HUN)	2

Round of 16
James Green (USA)	8
Néstor Tafur (COL)	0
Zurabi Erbotsonashvili (GEO)	11
Hai Ri (CHN)	0
Adrian Moise (ROU)	0
Mostafa Hosseinkhani (IRI)	10
Yuhi Fujinami (JPN)	11
Miroslav Kirov (BUL)	0

Quarterfinals
James Green (USA)	3
Zurabi Erbotsonashvili (GEO)	2
Mostafa Hosseinkhani (IRI)	6
Yuhi Fujinami (JPN)	7

Semifinals
James Green (USA)	5
Yuhi Fujinami (JPN)	3

=== Bottom half ===
Round of 32
Lee Gun-woo (KOR)	1
Elaman Dogdurbek Uulu (KGZ)	4
Frank Chamizo (ITA)	9
Ikhtiyor Navruzov (UZB)	5
Ganzorigiin Mandakhnaran (MGL)	9
Michael Asselstine (CAN)	0
Akzhurek Tanatarov (KAZ)	9
Amit Kumar Dhankar (IND)	2
Mark Popov (ISR)	0
Yakup Gör (TUR)	11
Heorhi Kaliyeu (BLR)	6
Semen Radulov (UKR)	8
Lennard Wickel (GER)	3
Magomedkhabib Kadimagomedov (RUS)	14

Round of 16
Elaman Dogdurbek Uulu (KGZ)	0
Frank Chamizo (ITA)	12^{F}
Ganzorigiin Mandakhnaran (MGL)	3
Akzhurek Tanatarov (KAZ)	8
Yakup Gör (TUR)	7
Semen Radulov (UKR)	2
Magomedkhabib Kadimagomedov (RUS)	11
Mihail Sava (MDA)	0

Quarterfinals
Frank Chamizo (ITA)	12
Akzhurek Tanatarov (KAZ)	0
Yakup Gör (TUR)	6
Magomedkhabib Kadimagomedov (RUS)	5

Semifinals
Frank Chamizo (ITA)	5
Yakup Gör (TUR)	2

=== Repechage ===
Repechage round 1
Ikhtiyor Navruzov (UZB)	5
Elaman Dogdurbek Uulu (KGZ)	0

Repechage round 2
Néstor Tafur (COL)	6
Zurabi Erbotsonashvili (GEO)	7
Ikhtiyor Navruzov (UZB)	5
Akzhurek Tanatarov (KAZ)	8

Bronze medals
Zurabi Erbotsonashvili (GEO)	0
Yuhi Fujinami (JPN)	11
Akzhurek Tanatarov (KAZ)	4
Yakup Gör (TUR)	2
