= 2017 World Wrestling Championships – Men's freestyle 65 kg =

Men's freestyle 65 kg at the 2017 World Championships
- Venue: AccorHotels Arena
- Dates: 26 August 2017
- Competitors: 31 from 31 nations

Medalists
gold medal	Zurabi Iakobishvili	Georgia
silver medal	Magomedmurad Gadzhiev	Poland
bronze medal	Alan Gogaev	Russia
bronze medal	Alejandro Valdés	Cuba

The men's freestyle 65 kilograms is a competition featured at the 2017 World Wrestling Championships, and was held in Paris, France on 26 August 2017.

This freestyle wrestling competition consisted of a single-elimination tournament, with a repechage used to determine the winners of two bronze medals.

== Results ==
Legend

- F — Won by fall

=== Final ===
Final
Zurabi Iakobishvili (GEO)	3
Magomedmurad Gadzhiev (POL)	1

=== Top half ===
Round of 32
Bajrang Punia (IND)	6
Alexander Semisorow (GER)	2
Meirzhan Ashirov (KAZ)	6
Dmitrii Malencov (MDA)	3
Álbaro Rudesindo (DOM)	4
Mustafa Kaya (TUR)	10
Lee Seung-chul (KOR)	2
Alan Gogaev (RUS)	5
Meisam Nassiri (IRI)	11
Abdulrahman Ibrahim (QAT)	0
Adam Batirov (BRN)	10
Gui Jianglin (CHN)	0
Zain Retherford (USA)	10
David Habat (SLO)	0

Round of 16
Zurabi Iakobishvili (GEO)	6
Bajrang Punia (IND)	5
Meirzhan Ashirov (KAZ)	0
Mustafa Kaya (TUR)	8
Alan Gogaev (RUS)	6
Meisam Nassiri (IRI)	5
Adam Batirov (BRN)	6
Zain Retherford (USA)	4

Quarterfinals
Zurabi Iakobishvili (GEO)	12^{F}
Mustafa Kaya (TUR)	6
Alan Gogaev (RUS)	2
Adam Batirov (BRN)	1

Semifinals
Zurabi Iakobishvili (GEO)	3
Alan Gogaev (RUS)	3

=== Bottom half ===
Round of 32
Aghahuseyn Mustafayev (AZE)	13
Narmandakhyn Lkhamgarmaa (MGL)	2
Nikolay Kurtev (BUL)	3
Azamat Nurykau (BLR)	13
Haislan Garcia (CAN)	0
Magomedmurad Gadzhiev (POL)	3
Kim Kuk-gwang (PRK)	7
Masakazu Kamoi (JPN)	4
Maxime Fiquet (FRA)	6
Amas Daniel (NGR)	2
Norbert Lukács (HUN)	0
Alejandro Valdés (CUB)	10
Liam Neyland (AUS)	0
Hor Ohannesian (UKR)	12
Sixto Auccapiña (PER)	0
Franklin Gómez (PUR)	8

Round of 16
Aghahuseyn Mustafayev (AZE)	4
Azamat Nurykau (BLR)	5
Magomedmurad Gadzhiev (POL)	12
Kim Kuk-gwang (PRK)	1
Maxime Fiquet (FRA)	1
Alejandro Valdés (CUB)	12
Hor Ohannesian (UKR)	1
Franklin Gómez (PUR)	3

Quarterfinals
Azamat Nurykau (BLR)	1
Magomedmurad Gadzhiev (POL)	4
Alejandro Valdés (CUB)	11
Franklin Gómez (PUR)	2

Semifinals
Magomedmurad Gadzhiev (POL)	1
Alejandro Valdés (CUB)	1

=== Repechage ===
Repechage round 1
Haislan Garcia (CAN)	5
Kim Kuk-gwang (PRK)	5

Repechage round 2
Bajrang Punia (IND)	3
Mustafa Kaya (TUR)	8
Haislan Garcia (CAN)	9
Azamat Nurykau (BLR)	10

Bronze medals
Mustafa Kaya (TUR)	2
Alan Gogaev (RUS)	8
Azamat Nurykau (BLR)	2
Alejandro Valdés (CUB)	4
