= Centro Sportivo Esercito =

Sport section of the Italian Army

- Sport: 17 disciplines
- Jurisdiction: Italy
- Abbreviation: C.S. Esercito
- Founded: 1960
- Affiliation: CONI
- Headquarters: Rome

Official website
- www.esercito.difesa.it

The Centro Sportivo Esercito (sometimes known as Gruppo Sportivo Esercito or with the acronym CSE), is the sport section of the Italian Army.

== History ==
Centro Sportivo Esercito was born on 1 January 1960 on the occasion of the 1960 Summer Olympics that took place in Rome.

== Sections ==
- Olympic Sports Center of the Italian Army
- Alpine Training Centre - Sports Activities Department
- Section Parachuting of the Centro Sportivo Esercito
- Military Centre of Equestrianism
- Section Powerboating of the 2° Reggimento Genio Pontieri

== Sports ==
There are 17 disciplines and 5 sections.

- Athletics
- Equestrian
- Artistic gymnastics
- Judo
- Wrestling
- Karate
- Powerboating
- Parachuting
- Modern pentathlon
- Military pentathlon
- Boxing
- Fencing
- Weightlifting
- Taekwondo
- Shooting
- Triathlon
- Winter sports

== Notable athletes ==
Alpine skiing

- Camilla Alfieri
- Giuliano Razzoli

Artistic gymnastics

- Vanessa Ferrari

Athletics

- Elisa Cusma
- Daniele Meucci
- Marta Milani

Biathlon

- Samuela Comola
- Dominik Windisch

Cross-country skiing

- Marco Albarello
- Francesco De Fabiani
- Magda Genuin

Speed skating

- Riccardo Lorello

Swimming

- Fabio Scozzoli
- Dario Verani

== Best results ==
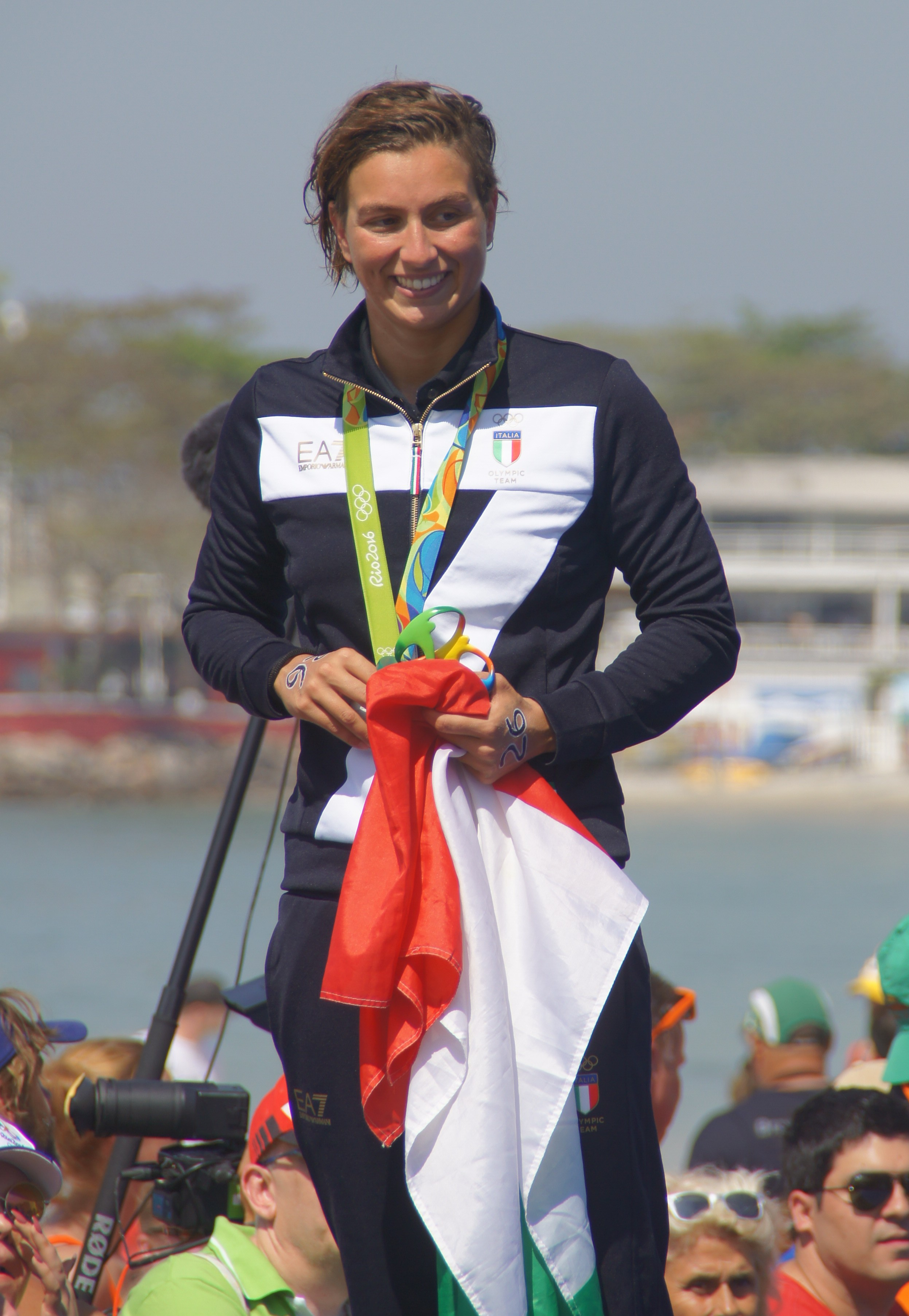
Rachele Bruni silver medal in open water swimming at Rio 2016.

Competition	Athlete	Event	Medal
Olympic Games
Milano Cortina 2026	Riccardo Lorello	Speed skating - 5000m	(bronze) Bronze
Paris 2024	Angela Andreoli	Gymnastics – Women's Team	Silver
Tokyo 2020	Vanessa Ferrari	Gymnastics – Women's Floor Exercise	Silver
Rio de Janeiro 2016	Fabio Basile	Judo - 66 Kg	Gold
Rio de Janeiro 2016	Diana Bacosi	Shooting - Skeet	Gold
Rio de Janeiro 2016	Odette Giuffrida	Judo - 52 Kg	Silver
Rio de Janeiro 2016	Rachele Bruni	Swimming - 10 Km	Silver
Rio de Janeiro 2016	Frank Chamizo	Wrestling freestyle - 65 Kg	Bronze
Rio de Janeiro 2016	Francesca Dallapè	Diving - Synchro 3 m springboard	Bronze
Rio de Janeiro 2016	Gabriele Detti	Swimming - 400 m	Bronze
Rio de Janeiro 2016	Gabriele Detti	Swimming - 1500 m	Bronze
Rio de Janeiro 2016	Monica Contrafatto	Athletics - 100 m T42	Bronze
London 2012	Mauro Sarmiento	Taekwondo - 80 Kg	Bronze
Beijing 2008	Mauro Sarmiento	Taekwondo - 80 Kg	Silver
World Championships
Budapest 2022	Dario Verani	Swimming - Open water 25 Km	Gold
Lienz 2016	Mattia Busato	Karate - Individual kata	Bronze
Las Vegas 2015	Frank Chamizo	Wrestling freestyle - 65 Kg	Gold
Bremen 2014	Sara Cardin	Karate - Kumite 55 kg	Gold
Shangai 2011	Alice Franco	Swimming - Open water 25 Km	Bronze
Shangai 2011	Fabio Scozzoli	Swimming - 50 m breaststroke	Silver
Shangai 2011	Fabio Scozzoli	Swimming - 100 m breaststroke	Silver
Rome 2009	Valerio Cleri	Swimming - Open water 25 Km	Gold
European Championships
Tomaszów Mazowiecki 2026	Riccardo Lorello	Speed skating - 5000m	Silver
Budapest 2020	Dario Verani	Open water swimming - 5 km	Bronze
Glasgow 2018	Fabio Scozzoli	Swimming - 50 m breaststroke	Silver
Glasgow 2018	Fabio Scozzoli	Swimming - 100 m mixed medley	Bronze
Novi Sad 2017	Frank Chamizo	Wrestling freestyle 70 Kg	Gold
Kocaeli 2017	Sara Cardin	Karate - Kumite 55 kg	Silver
Kocaeli 2017	Mattia Busato	Karate - Team kata	Gold
Kocaeli 2017	Mattia Busato	Karate - Individual kata	Bronze
Split 2017	Mirko Zanni	Weightlifting - Snatch 69 Kg	Silver
Amsterdam 2016	Veronica Inglese	athletics - Half marathon	Silver
Hoorn 2016	Simone Ruffini	Open water swimming - Team 5 km	Gold
Osijej 2013	Giuseppe Giordano	Shooting - 50 m pistol	Gold
Turin 2011	Noemi Batki	Diving - 10 m platform	Gold
Barcelona 2010	Daniele Meucci	Athletics - 10,000 m	Bronze
Eindhoven 2009	Elisa Cusma	Athletics - 800 m	Bronze

== See also ==
- Italian military sports bodies
- Athletes of Gruppo Sportivo Esercito
