= Haydar Yavuz =

Turkish freestyle wrestler

Personal information
- Born: 5 September 1994 (age 31) Kahramanmaraş, Turkey
- Height: 177 cm (5 ft 10 in)
- Weight: 70 kg (150 lb; 11 st)

Sport
- Country: Turkey
- Sport: Amateur wrestling
- Weight class: 70 kg
- Event: Freestyle
- Club: ASKİ Spor Club
Medal record
Men's freestyle wrestling
Representing Turkey
European Championships
Bronze medal – third place	2020 Rome	70 kg
Individual World Cup
Silver medal – second place	2020 Belgrade	70 kg
Yasar Dogu Tournament
Gold medal – first place	2025 Kocaeli	70 kg
Bronze medal – third place	2019 Istanbul	70 kg
Bronze medal – third place	2023 Istanbul	70 kg
Dan Kolov & Nikola Petrov Tournament
Silver medal – second place	2018 Sofia	70 kg
European U23 Championship
Silver medal – second place	2017 Istanbul	65 kg
World University Championship
Bronze medal – third place	2018 Goiana	70 kg

Haydar Yavuz (born 5 September 1994) is a Turkish freestyle wrestler. He won one of the bronze medals in the 70 kg event at the 2020 European Wrestling Championships held in Rome, Italy.

== Career ==
In 2018, he competed in the 70 kg event at the European Wrestling Championships held in Kaspiysk, Russia without winning a medal. In 2019, he competed in the 70 kg event at the World Wrestling Championships held in Nur-Sultan, Kazakhstan where he was eliminated in his first match by Aghahuseyn Mustafayev.

He won the silver medal in the 70 kg event at the 2020 Individual Wrestling World Cup held in Belgrade, Serbia. He lost his bronze medal match in the men's 70 kg event at the 2024 European Wrestling Championships held in Bucharest, Romania.

== Achievements ==
Year	Tournament	Venue	Result	Event
2020	European Championships	Rome, Italy	3rd	Freestyle 70 kg
2020	Individual Wrestling World Cup	Belgrade, Serbia	2rd	Freestyle 70 kg
