= 2016 European Wrestling Championships – Men's freestyle 65 kg =

The men's freestyle 65 kg is a competition featured at the 2016 European Wrestling Championships, and was held in Riga, Latvia on March 8.

== Medalists ==
Gold	Frank Chamizo; Italy
Silver	Mustafa Kaya; Turkey
Bronze	Semen Radulov; Ukraine
Bronze	Israil Kasumov; Russia

== Results ==
Legend

- F — Won by fall

=== Final ===
Final
Mustafa Kaya (TUR)	6
Frank Chamizo (ITA)	8

=== Top half ===
==== Section 1 ====
Round of 32

Round of 16
Maximilian Ausserleitner (AUT)	0
Israil Kasumov (RUS)	10
Andrei Prepeliţă (MDA)	1
Aleksandr Kontoev (BLR)	1
David Habat (SLO)	12
Mustafa Kaya (TUR)	20
Zurabi Iakobishvili (GEO)	4
George Bucur (ROM)	1

Quarterfinals
Israil Kasumov (RUS)	6
Aleksandr Kontoev (BLR)	0
Mustafa Kaya (TUR)	7
Zurabi Iakobishvili (GEO)	1

Semifinals
Israil Kasumov (RUS)	5
Mustafa Kaya (TUR)	8

=== Bottom half ===
Round of 32
Semen Radulov (UKR)	10
Stefanov Novachkov (BUL)	0
Frank Chamizo (ITA)	10
Steven Graf (SUI)	0
Tomas Baracevičius (LTU)	4
Eduards Frolos (LAT)	12
Mykola Bolotňuk (SVK)	0
Aghahuseyn Mustafayev (AZE)	11
Norbert Lukács (HUN)	4
Aimar Andruse (EST)	6
Niko Arouzmanidis (GRE)	10
Kane Charig (GBR)	0
Kevin Henkel (GER)	2
Iurii Siemakin (FRA)	12

Round of 16
Dejan Mitrov (MKD)	1
Semen Radulov (UKR)	10^{F}
Frank Chamizo (ITA)	10
Eduards Frolos (LAT)	0
Aghahuseyn Mustafayev (AZE)	10
Aimar Andruse (EST)	0
Niko Arouzmanidis (GRE)	0
Iurii Siemakin (FRA)	10

Quarterfinals
Semen Radulov (UKR)	4
Frank Chamizo (ITA)	17
Aghahuseyn Mustafayev (AZE)	6
Iurii Siemakin (FRA)	3

Semifinals
Frank Chamizo (ITA)	11
Aghahuseyn Mustafayev (AZE)	1

=== Repechage ===
Repechage round 1
Steven Graf (SUI)	14
Eduards Frolos (LAT)	3

Repechage round 2
David Habat (SLO)	3
Zurabi Iakobishvili (GEO)	6
Steven Graf (SUI)	0
Semen Radulov (UKR)	10

Bronze medals
Zurabi Iakobishvili (GEO)	4
Israil Kasumov (RUS)	13
Semen Radulov (UKR)	4^{F}
Aghahuseyn Mustafayev (AZE)	5
