= 2020 European Wrestling Championships – Men's freestyle 74 kg =

Wrestling competition

The men's freestyle 74 kg is a competition featured at the 2020 European Wrestling Championships, and was held in Rome, Italy on February 15 and February 16.

== Medalists ==
| Gold | Frank Chamizo; Italy |
| Silver | Magomedrasul Gazimagomedov; Russia |
| Bronze | Avtandil Kentchadze; Georgia |
| Bronze | Soner Demirtaş; Turkey |

== Results ==
Legend

- F — Won by fall
- WO — Won by walkover

=== Final ===
| Final |
| Magomedrasul Gazimagomedov (RUS) | 3 |
| Frank Chamizo (ITA) | 5 |

=== Top half ===
Round of 32

Round of 16
Mitch Finesilver (ISR) | 4
Kyrillos Binenmpaoum (GRE) | 5
Zaur Efendiev (SRB) | 0
Miroslav Kirov (BUL) | 5
Jonatan Álvarez (ESP) | 0
Magomedrasul Gazimagomedov (RUS) | 10
Avtandil Kentchadze (GEO) | 9
Hrayr Alikhanyan (ARM) | 2

Quarterfinals
Kyrillos Binenmpaoum (GRE) | 0
Miroslav Kirov (BUL) | 6
Magomedrasul Gazimagomedov (RUS) | 9
Avtandil Kentchadze (GEO) | 2

Semifinals
Miroslav Kirov (BUL) | 0
Magomedrasul Gazimagomedov (RUS) | 11

=== Bottom half ===
Round of 32
Charlie Bowling (GBR) | 3
Jakub Sýkora (SVK) | 13
Zurab Kapraev (ROU) | 3
Valentin Borzin (MDA) | 4
Denys Pavlov (UKR) | 10
Aimar Andruse (EST) | 0
Frank Chamizo (ITA) | 6
Soner Demirtaş (TUR) | 4
Patryk Ołenczyn (POL) | 2
Khadzhimurad Gadzhiyev (AZE) | 12

Round of 16
Charles Afa (FRA) | 3
Andrei Karpach (BLR) | 3
Murad Kuramagomedov (HUN) | 10
Jakub Sýkora (SVK) | 0
Valentin Borzin (MDA) | 4
Denys Pavlov (UKR) | 2
Frank Chamizo (ITA) | 5^{F}
Khadzhimurad Gadzhiyev (AZE) | 0

Quarterfinals
Andrei Karpach (BLR) | 2
Murad Kuramagomedov (HUN) | 6
Valentin Borzin (MDA) | 0
Frank Chamizo (ITA) | 8

Semifinals
Murad Kuramagomedov (HUN) | 0
Frank Chamizo (ITA) | 6

=== Repechage ===
Repechage round 1
Soner Demirtaş (TUR) | WO
Khadzhimurad Gadzhiyev (AZE)

Repechage round 2
Jonatan Álvarez (ESP) | 0
Avtandil Kentchadze (GEO) | 10
Soner Demirtaş (TUR) | 11
Valentin Borzin (MDA) | 0

Bronze medal match
Avtandil Kentchadze (GEO) | 8^{F}
Miroslav Kirov (BUL) | 0
Soner Demirtaş (TUR) | 5
Murad Kuramagomedov (HUN) | 0

== Final standing ==
| Rank | Athlete |
|---|---|
| 1st place, gold medalist(s) | Frank Chamizo (ITA) |
| 2nd place, silver medalist(s) | Magomedrasul Gazimagomedov (RUS) |
| 3rd place, bronze medalist(s) | Soner Demirtaş (TUR) |
| 3rd place, bronze medalist(s) | Avtandil Kentchadze (GEO) |
| 5 | Murad Kuramagomedov (HUN) |
| 5 | Miroslav Kirov (BUL) |
| 7 | Valentin Borzin (MDA) |
| 8 | Denys Pavlov (UKR) |
| 9 | Jakub Sýkora (SVK) |
| 10 | Khadzhimurad Gadzhiyev (AZE) |
| 11 | Andrei Karpach (BLR) |
| 12 | Kyrillos Binenmpaoum (GRE) |
| 13 | Mitch Finesilver (ISR) |
| 14 | Charles Afa (FRA) |
| 15 | Zurab Kapraev (ROU) |
| 16 | Charlie Bowling (GBR) |
| 17 | Hrayr Alikhanyan (ARM) |
| 18 | Patryk Ołenczyn (POL) |
| 19 | Zaur Efendiev (SRB) |
| 20 | Aimar Andruse (EST) |
| 21 | Jonatan Álvarez (ESP) |
