= 2020 European Wrestling Championships – Men's freestyle 70 kg =

Wrestling competition

The men's freestyle 70 kg is a competition featured at the 2020 European Wrestling Championships, and was held in Rome, Italy on February 14 and February 15.

== Medalists ==
Gold	Magomedmurad Gadzhiev; Poland
Silver	Ağahüseyn Mustafayev; Azerbaijan
Bronze	Haydar Yavuz; Turkey
Bronze	Mihai Sava; Moldova

== Results ==
Legend

- F — Won by fall

=== Final ===
Final
Magomedmurad Gadzhiev (POL)	2
Ağahüseyn Mustafayev (AZE)	0

=== Top half ===
Round of 32

Round of 16
Israil Kasumov (RUS)	5
Haydar Yavuz (TUR)	7
Magomedmurad Gadzhiev (POL)	10
Fati Vejseli (MKD)	0
Alban Sopa (KOS)	1
Gianluca Talamo (ITA)	11
Artem Auga (LTU)	0
Mirza Skhulukhia (GEO)	6

Quarterfinals
Haydar Yavuz (TUR)	0
Magomedmurad Gadzhiev (POL)	2
Gianluca Talamo (ITA)	2
Mirza Skhulukhia (GEO)	6

Semifinals
Magomedmurad Gadzhiev (POL)	4
Mirza Skhulukhia (GEO)	1

=== Bottom half ===
Round of 32
Gevorg Mkheyan (ARM)	8
Ağahüseyn Mustafayev (AZE)	15
Oleksii Boruta (UKR)	4
Nicolae Cojocaru (GBR)	1
Mihail Georgiev (BUL)	8
Kevin Henkel (GER)	0

Round of 16
Marc Dietsche (SUI)	0
Mihai Sava (MDA)	10
Eriglent Prizreni (ALB)	0
Roman Asharin (HUN)	10
Viktar Serada (BLR)	2
Ağahüseyn Mustafayev (AZE)	8
Oleksii Boruta (UKR)	15
Mihail Georgiev (BUL)	4

Quarterfinals
Mihai Sava (MDA)	11
Roman Asharin (HUN)	0
Ağahüseyn Mustafayev (AZE)	5
Oleksii Boruta (UKR)	2

Semifinals
Mihai Sava (MDA)	2
Ağahüseyn Mustafayev (AZE)	5

=== Repechage ===
Repechage round 1
Gevorg Mkheyan (ARM)	12
Viktar Serada (BLR)	2

Repechage round 2
Fati Vejseli (MKD)	1
Haydar Yavuz (TUR)	9
Gevorg Mkheyan (ARM)	7
Oleksii Boruta (UKR)	3

Bronze medal match
Haydar Yavuz (TUR)	7
Mirza Skhulukhia (GEO)	1
Gevorg Mkheyan (ARM)	7
Mihai Sava (MDA)	9

== Final standing ==
Rank	Athlete
1st place, gold medalist(s)	Magomedmurad Gadzhiev (POL)
2nd place, silver medalist(s)	Ağahüseyn Mustafayev (AZE)
3rd place, bronze medalist(s)	Haydar Yavuz (TUR)
3rd place, bronze medalist(s)	Mihai Sava (MDA)
5	Mirza Skhulukhia (GEO)
5	Gevorg Mkheyan (ARM)
7	Oleksii Boruta (UKR)
8	Gianluca Talamo (ITA)
9	Roman Asharin (HUN)
10	Mihail Georgiev (BUL)
11	Viktar Serada (BLR)
12	Israil Kasumov (RUS)
13	Nicolae Cojocaru (GBR)
14	Alban Sopa (KOS)
15	Fati Vejseli (MKD)
16	Artem Auga (LTU)
17	Kevin Henkel (GER)
18	Marc Dietsche (SUI)
19	Eriglent Prizreni (ALB)
