= Golden Grand Prix Ivan Yarygin 2018 – Men's freestyle 70 kg =

Freestyle wrestling event

The men's freestyle 70 kg is a competition featured at the Golden Grand Prix Ivan Yarygin 2018, and was held in Krasnoyarsk, Russia on 26 January.

== Medalists ==
Gold	(Dagestan) Magomed Kurbanaliev
Silver	(Dagestan) Magomedrasul Gazimagomedov
Bronze	(Ukraine) Andrii Kviatkovskyi
Bronze	(United States) Frank Molinaro

== Results ==
Legend

- F — Won by fall

=== Final ===
Final
(Dagestan) Magomed Kurbanaliev	2
(Dagestan) Magomedrasul Gazimagomedov	2

=== Top half ===
- qualification: Magomedrasul Gazimagomedov of Dagestan def. Abdullahgadzhi Magomedov of Dagestan (4–1)

==== Section 1 ====
Round of 8
(Turkmenistan) Batyr Nabiyev	6
(Mongolia) Narmandakhyn Lkhamgarmaa	8
(Uzbekistan) Mirzo Khayitov	1
(Dagestan) Magomed Kurbanaliev	8
(Mongolia) Tsogtgerel Buyantsogi	2
(Georgia (country)) Levan Kelekhasashvili	9
(Mongolia) Temuulen Enkhtuya	13
(Cuba) Franklin Castillo	17
(Turkey) Haydarv Yavuz	0
(Krasnoyarsk Krai) Israil Kasumov	12
(Dagestan) Magomedrasul Gazimagomedov	11
(Georgia (country)) Ramazan Malakoevi	0
(Ukraine) Andrii Kviatkovskyi	10
(Turkmenistan) Batyr Orazgylyjov	0

Quarterfinals
(United States) Frank Molinaro	11
(Mongolia) Narmandakhyn Lkhamgarmaa	0
(Dagestan) Magomed Kurbanaliev	10
(Georgia (country)) Levan Kelekhasashvili	0
(Cuba) Franklin Castillo	0
(Krasnoyarsk Krai) Israil Kasumov	7
(Dagestan) Magomedrasul Gazimagomedov	4
(Ukraine) Andrii Kviatkovskyi	2

Semifinals
(United States) Frank Molinaro	5
(Dagestan) Magomed Kurbanaliev	8
(Krasnoyarsk Krai) Israil Kasumov	1
(Dagestan) Magomedrasul Gazimagomedov	7

Final

== Repechage ==
Repechage round 1
-
-
-
-

Repechage round 2
(Uzbekistan) Mirzo Khayitov	1
(Georgia (country)) Levan Kelekhasashvili	12
(Georgia (country)) Ramazan Malakoevi	3
(Ukraine) Andrii Kviatkovskyi	8

Bronze medals
(Georgia (country)) Levan Kelekhasashvili	3
(United States) Frank Molinaro	5
(Ukraine) Andrii Kviatkovskyi	13
(Krasnoyarsk Krai) Israil Kasumov	2
