= Magomedmurad Gadzhiev =

Polish freestyle wrestler

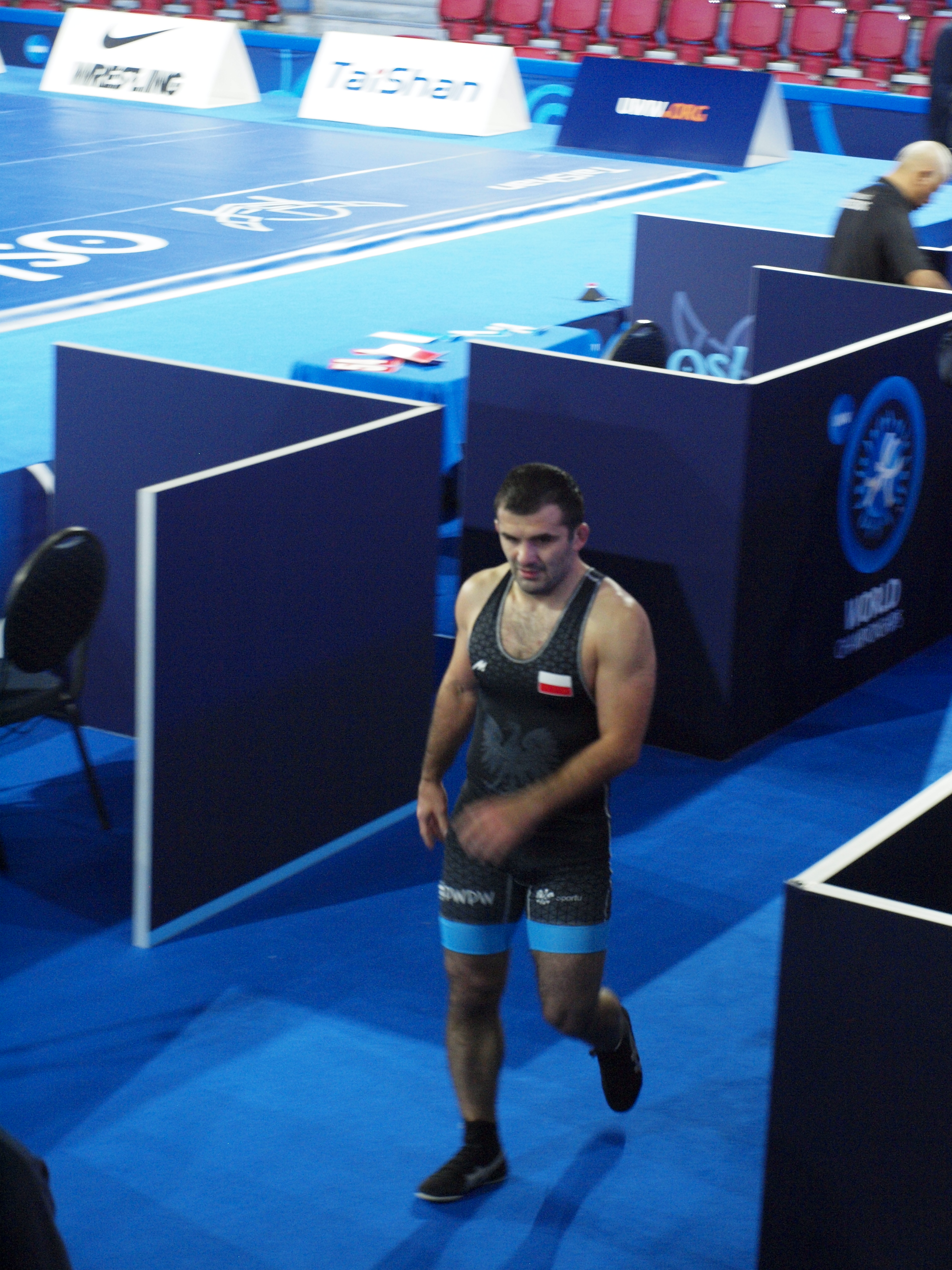
- Magomedmurad Gadzhiev at the 2021 World Wrestling Championships in Oslo, Norway

Personal information
- Native name: Магомедмурад Саидпашаевич Гаджиев
- Full name: Magomedmurad Saidpashievich Gadzhiev
- Nationality: Russian; Polish
- Born: 15 February 1988 (age 38) Gurbuki, Dagestan ASSR, Russian SFSR, Soviet Union
- Height: 1.65 m (5 ft 5 in)

Sport
- Country: Poland (since 2014); Russia
- Sport: Wrestling
- Weight class: 70 kg
- Rank: Number one in the ranking UWW (April 2016), International Master of Sports.
- Event: Freestyle
- Club: Gadzhi Makhachev WC (Makhachkala)
- Coached by: Magomed Dibirov, Yusup Abdusalamov
Medal record
Men's freestyle wrestling
Representing Poland
World Championships
Gold medal – first place	2021 Oslo	70 kg
Silver medal – second place	2017 Paris	65 kg
Bronze medal – third place	2019 Nur-Sultan	70 kg
Individual World Cup
Gold medal – first place	2020 Belgrade	70 kg
European Games
Silver medal – second place	2015 Baku	70 kg
European Championships
Gold medal – first place	2016 Riga	70 kg
Gold medal – first place	2020 Rome	70 kg
Silver medal – second place	2017 Novi Sad	70 kg
Silver medal – second place	2018 Kaspiysk	70 kg
Bronze medal – third place	2019 Bucharest	70 kg
Intercontinental Cup
Gold medal – first place	2015 Khasavyurt	70 kg
Representing Russia
European Championships
Silver medal – second place	2010 Baku	66 kg
World Cup
Gold medal – first place	2010 Makhachkala	66 kg
Golden Grand Prix Ivan Yarygin
Gold medal – first place	2010 Krasnoyarsk	66 kg
Bronze medal – third place	2009 Krasnoyarsk	66 kg
Bronze medal – third place	2011 Krasnoyarsk	66 kg
Russian National Championships
Bronze medal – third place	2010 Volgograd	66 kg
Ramzan Kadyrov and Adlan Varayev Cup
Bronze medal – third place	2010 Grozny	66 kg
Junior World Championships
Gold medal – first place	2008 Istanbul	66 kg

Magomedmurad Saidpashievich Gadzhiev (Russian: Магомедмурад Саидпашаевич Гаджиев, Polish: Magomedmurad Gadżijew; born 15 February 1988) is a Russian-born Polish former freestyle wrestler who claimed 2021 world gold medal.

== Life and career ==
He originates from Dagestan and started practicing wrestling in 2000. Until 2012, he represented Russia. Since 2012, he has been representing Poland after having been granted Polish citizenhip.

He is the International Master of Sports in Freestyle Wrestling. He is bronze medalist of 2010 Russian Freestyle Wrestling Nationals. At 2015 World Wrestling Championships in the second round he lost to World Champion Frank Chamizo (3-4) European Games 2015 runner-up, who competed in the men's freestyle 70 kg category at the 2015 European Games and won the silver medal. Golden Grand prix Ivan Yarygin 2010 champion, bronze medalist in 2009 and 2011, European Championships 2010 runner-up, Ramzan Kadyrov Cup 3rd 2010 and World Cup 2011 winner. Gadzhiev took part in the 2016 Summer Olympic Games and the 2020 Summer Olympic Games.

== Championships and accomplishments ==
- Junior level:
  - 2008 Junior World Championships gold medalist – 66 kg
- Senior Level:
  - 2010 Russian Nationals bronze medalist – 66 kg
  - 2010 World Cup gold medalist – 66 kg
  - 2010 European Championships silver medalist – 66 kg
  - 2010 Ivan Yarygin international runner-up – 66 kg
  - 2009, 2011 Ivan Yarygin international 3rd – 66 kg
  - 2010 Ramzan Kadyrov and Adlan Varayev Cup 3rd – 66 kg
  - 2014 intercontinental Cup winner – 70 kg
  - 2015 World Wrestling Championships 7th – 65 kg
  - 2015 European Games silver medalist – 70 kg
  - 2016 European Championships gold medalist – 70 kg
  - 2017 World Championships silver medalist – 65 kg
  - 2018 European Championships silver medalist – 70 kg
  - 2019 European Championships bronze medalist – 70 kg
  - 2019 World Championships bronze medalist – 70 kg
  - 2021 World Championships gold medalist – 70 kg
