= 2017 European Wrestling Championships – Men's freestyle 70 kg =

The men's freestyle 70 kg is a competition featured at the 2017 European Wrestling Championships, and was held in Novi Sad, Serbia on May 5.

== Medalists ==
Gold	Frank Chamizo (ITA)
Silver	Magomedmurad Gadzhiev (POL)
Bronze	Ruslan Dibirgadzhiyev (AZE)
Bronze	Israil Kasumov (RUS)

== Results ==
Legend

- F — Won by fall

=== Final ===
Final
Frank Chamizo (ITA)	4
Magomedmurad Gadzhiev (POL)	3

=== Top half ===
==== Section 1 ====
Round of 32

Round of 16
Ruslan Dibirgadzhiyev (AZE)	0
Frank Chamizo (ITA)	6
Nikola Gajić (SRB)	0
Mihai Sava (MDA)	10
Adrian Moise (ROU)	8
Mark Popov (ISR)	2
Jere Kunnas (FIN)	0
Zsombor Gulyás (HUN)	6

Quarterfinals
Frank Chamizo (ITA)	10
Mihai Sava (MDA)	0
Adrian Moise (ROU)	5
Zsombor Gulyás (HUN)	1

Semifinals
Frank Chamizo (ITA)	10
Adrian Moise (ROU)	0

=== Bottom half ===
Round of 32
Israil Kasumov (RUS)	12
Tim Müller (GER)	2

Round of 16
Semen Radulov (UKR)	10
Surkho Rashytkhanau (BLR)	3
Nikolay Kurtev (BUL)	1
Magomedmurad Gadzhiev (POL)	5
Davit Tlashadze (GEO)	6
Yakup Gör (TUR)	7
Valter Margaryan (ARM)	0
Israil Kasumov (RUS)	11

Quarterfinals
Semen Radulov (UKR)	1
Magomedmurad Gadzhiev (POL)	7
Yakup Gör (TUR)	0
Israil Kasumov (RUS)	10

Semifinals
Magomedmurad Gadzhiev (POL)	6
Israil Kasumov (RUS)	4

=== Repechage ===
Repechage round 2
Ruslan Dibirgadzhiyev (AZE)	7
Mihai Sava (MDA)	0
Nikolay Kurtev (BUL)	7
Semen Radulov (UKR)	6

Bronze medals
Ruslan Dibirgadzhiyev (AZE)	4
Adrian Moise (ROU)	0
Nikolay Kurtev (BUL)	4
Israil Kasumov (RUS)	14
