= 2018 European Wrestling Championships – Men's freestyle 74 kg =

The men's freestyle 74 kg is a competition featured at the 2018 European Wrestling Championships, and was held in Kaspiysk, Russia on May 5 and May 6.

== Medalists ==
Gold	Soner Demirtaş; Turkey
Silver	Zelimkhan Khadjiev; France
Bronze	Andrei Karpach; Belarus
Bronze	Frank Chamizo; Italy

== Results ==
Legend

- F — Won by fall

=== Final ===
Final
Zelimkhan Khadjiev (FRA)	0
Soner Demirtaş (TUR)	2

=== Top half ===
Round of 32

Round of 16
Hanoch Rachamin (ISR)	8
Zaur Efendiev (SRB)	9
Kyrillos Binenmpaoum (GRE)	1
Zelimkhan Khadjiev (FRA)	11
Joshgun Azimov (AZE)	6
Andrius Mažeika (LTU)	8^{F}
Andrei Karpach (BLR)	6
Alberts Jurčenko (LAT)	4

Quarterfinals
Zaur Efendiev (SRB)	0
Zelimkhan Khadjiev (FRA)	11
Andrius Mažeika (LTU)	7
Andrei Karpach (BLR)	8

Semifinals
Zelimkhan Khadjiev (FRA)	7
Andrei Karpach (BLR)	2

=== Bottom half ===
Round of 32
Akhsarbek Gulaev (SVK)	0
Soner Demirtaş (TUR)	4
Vasile Minzala (ROU)	2
Zsombor Gulyás (HUN)	1

Round of 16
Avtandil Kentchadze (GEO)	4
Frank Chamizo (ITA)	9
Khetag Tsabolov (RUS)	7
Vasyl Mykhailov (UKR)	0
Grigor Grigoryan (ARM)	2
Ali Umarpashaev (BUL)	13
Soner Demirtaş (TUR)	7
Vasile Minzala (ROU)	0

Quarterfinals
Frank Chamizo (ITA)	5^{F}
Khetag Tsabolov (RUS)	0
Ali Umarpashaev (BUL)	1
Soner Demirtaş (TUR)	8

Semifinals
Frank Chamizo (ITA)	3
Soner Demirtaş (TUR)	4

=== Repechage ===
Repechage round 1
Achsarbek Gulajev (SVK)	4
Vasile Minzala (ROU)	0

Repechage round 2
Kyrillos Binenmpaoum (GRE)	0
Zaur Efendiev (SRB)	10
Akhsarbek Gulaev (SVK)	6
Ali Umarpashaev (BUL)	2

Bronze medal match
Zaur Efendiev (SRB)	0
Andrei Karpach (BLR)	10
Achsarbek Gulajev (SVK)	0
Frank Chamizo (ITA)	10
