= 2022 European Wrestling Championships – Men's freestyle 70 kg =

Wrestling competition

Men's freestyle 70 kg at the 2022 European Wrestling Championships
- Venue: BOK Sports Hall
- Location: Budapest, Hungary
- Dates: 28-29 March
- Competitors: 16

Medalists
gold medal	Zurabi Iakobishvili	Georgia
silver medal	Arman Andreasyan	Armenia
bronze medal	Ramazan Ramazanov	Bulgaria
bronze medal	Nicolai Grahmez	Moldova

The men's freestyle 70 kg was a competition featured at the 2022 European Wrestling Championships, and was held in Budapest, Hungary on March 28 and 29.

== Results ==
Legend

- F — Won by fall

=== Main Bracket ===
1/8 finals
Zurabi Iakobishvili (GEO)	5
Marc Dietsche (SUI)	1
Daniel Chomanič (SVK)	4
Ramazan Ramazanov (BUL)	14
Fati Vejseli (MKD)	13
Gianluca Talamo (ITA)	3
Ziraddin Bayramov (AZE)	10
Dániel Antal (HUN)	6
Nicolai Grahmez (MDA)	11
Orges Lila (ALB)	1
Patryk Ołenczyn (POL)	12
Raul Zarbaliev (ISR)	2
Alban Sopa (KOS)	0
Kevin Henkel (GER)	12
Selahattin Kılıçsallayan (TUR)	1
Arman Andreasyan (ARM)	3

Quarterfinals
Zurabi Iakobishvili (GEO)	12
Ramazan Ramazanov (BUL)	2
Fati Vejseli (MKD)	4
Ziraddin Bayramov (AZE)	9
Nicolai Grahmez (MDA)	14
Patryk Ołenczyn (POL)	9
Kevin Henkel (GER)	1
Arman Andreasyan (ARM)	5

Semifinals
Zurabi Iakobishvili (GEO)	4
Ziraddin Bayramov (AZE)	3
Nicolai Grahmez (MDA)	2
Arman Andreasyan (ARM)	6

Final
Zurabi Iakobishvili (GEO)	2
Arman Andreasyan (ARM)	1

=== Repechage ===
Repechage round 1
Marc Dietsche (SUI)	3
Ramazan Ramazanov (BUL)	11
Selahattin Kılıçsallayan (TUR)	10
Kevin Henkel (GER)	8

Bronze medal match
Ramazan Ramazanov (BUL)	11^{F}
Ziraddin Bayramov (AZE)	7
Selahattin Kılıçsallayan (TUR)	4
Nicolai Grahmez (MDA)	11^{F}

== Final standing ==
Rank	Wrestler	UWW Points
1st place, gold medalist(s)	Zurabi Iakobishvili (GEO)	13000
2nd place, silver medalist(s)	Arman Andreasyan (ARM)	11000
3rd place, bronze medalist(s)	Nicolai Grahmez (MDA)	9500
3rd place, bronze medalist(s)	Ramazan Ramazanov (BUL)	9500
5	Ziraddin Bayramov (AZE)	8000
5	Selahattin Kılıçsallayan (TUR)	8000
7	Kevin Henkel (GER)	7400
8	Patryk Ołenczyn (POL)	7000
9	Fati Vejseli (MKD)	6500
10	Marc Dietsche (SUI)	6100
11	Dániel Antal (HUN)	4000
12	Daniel Chomanič (SVK)	3800
13	Gianluca Talamo (ITA)	3600
14	Raul Zarbaliev (ISR)	3400
15	Orges Lila (ALB)	3200
16	Alban Sopa (KOS)	3100
