= Yuhi Fujinami =

Japanese freestyle wrestler (born 1996)

Personal information
- Native name: 藤波勇飛
- Born: May 27, 1996 (age 30) Mie, Japan
- Height: 1.73 m (5 ft 8 in)
- Relative: Akari Fujinami (sister)

Sport
- Sport: Wrestling
- Weight class: 74 kg
- Event: Freestyle
- Coached by: Yuji Takada (club); Shigeki Nishiguchi (national); Kenji Inoue (national)
Medal record
Men's freestyle wrestling
Representing Japan
World Championships
Bronze medal – third place	2017 Paris	70 kg
World Cup
Bronze medal – third place	2018 Iowa	Team
Asian Games
Bronze medal – third place	2018 Jakarta	74 kg
Junior World Championships
Silver medal – second place	2015 Salvador da Bahia	66 kg
Bronze medal – third place	2016 Macon	66 kg
Junior Asian Championships
Silver medal – second place	2014 Ulaanbaatar	66 kg
Cadet World Championships
Silver medal – second place	2013 Zrenjanin	63 kg

Yuhi Fujinami (藤波勇飛, Fujinami Yuhi; born May 27, 1996) is a Japanese freestyle wrestler. A former Japan national champion, he won bronze medals at the 2017 World Championships and 2018 Asian Games. He took up wrestling aged eight at the wrestling gym of his father, Toshikazu Fujinami, a wrestling coach and a former wrestler. He has a degree in law from the Yamanashi Gakuin University.
