= 2016 European Wrestling Championships – Men's freestyle 70 kg =

The men's freestyle 70 kg is a competition featured at the 2016 European Wrestling Championships, and was held in Riga, Latvia on March 11.

== Medalists ==
Gold	Magomedmurad Gadzhiev; Poland
Silver	Davit Tlashadze; Georgia
Bronze	Nikolay Kurtev; Bulgaria
Bronze	Azamat Nurykau; Belarus

== Results ==
Legend

- R — Retired
- F — Won by fall

=== Final ===
Final
Davit Tlashadze (GEO)	0
Magomedmurad Gadzhiev (POL)	7

=== Top half ===
==== Section 1 ====
Round of 32

Round of 16
Yves Neyer (SUI)	0
Zsombor Gulyas (HUN)	11
Philipp Crepaz (AUT)	0
Adrian Moise (ROM)	12
Andreas Triantafyllids (GRE)	2
Nikolay Kurtev (BUL)	4
Davit Tlashadze (GEO)	0
Petteri Martinkainen (FIN)	0^{R}

Quarterfinals
Zsombor Gulyas (HUN)	1
Adrian Moise (ROM)	5^{F}
Nikolay Kurtev (BUL)	1
Davit Tlashadze (GEO)	3

Semifinals
Adrian Moise (ROM)	4
Davit Tlashadze (GEO)	8

=== Bottom half ===
Round of 32
David Safaryan (ARM)	7
Lennard Wickel (GER)	0
Angelo Costa (ITA)	0
Muhammed Ilkhan (TUR)	10
Magomedmurad Gadzhiev (POL)	4
Zaurbek Sidakov (RUS)	4

Round of 16
Azamat Nurykau (BLR)	7
Gitinomagomed Gadzhiev (AZE)	5
Nicolai Chireacov (MDA)	0
Andrii Kviatkovskyi (UKR)	13
Alans Amirovs (LAT)	3
David Safaryan (ARM)	14
Muhammed Ilkhan (TUR)	0
Magomedmurad Gadzhiev (POL)	10^{F}

Quarterfinals
Azamat Nurykau (BLR)	3
Andrii Kviatkovskyi (UKR)	2
David Safaryan (ARM)	0
Magomedmurad Gadzhiev (POL)	6

Semifinals
Azamat Nurykau (BLR)	8
Magomedmurad Gadzhiev (POL)	9

=== Repechage ===
Repechage round 1
Zaurbek Sidakov (RUS)	4
Muhammed Ilkhan (TUR)	2

Repechage round 2
Petteri Martinkainen (FIN)	0^{R}
Nikolay Kurtev (BUL)	0
Zaurbek Sidakov (RUS)	9
David Safaryan (ARM)	4

Bronze medals
Nikolay Kurtev (BUL)	9
Adrian Moise (ROM)	2
Zaurbek Sidakov (RUS)	7
Azamat Nurykau (BLR)	9
