= Andriy Kviatkovskyi =

Ukrainian freestyle wrestler (born 1990)

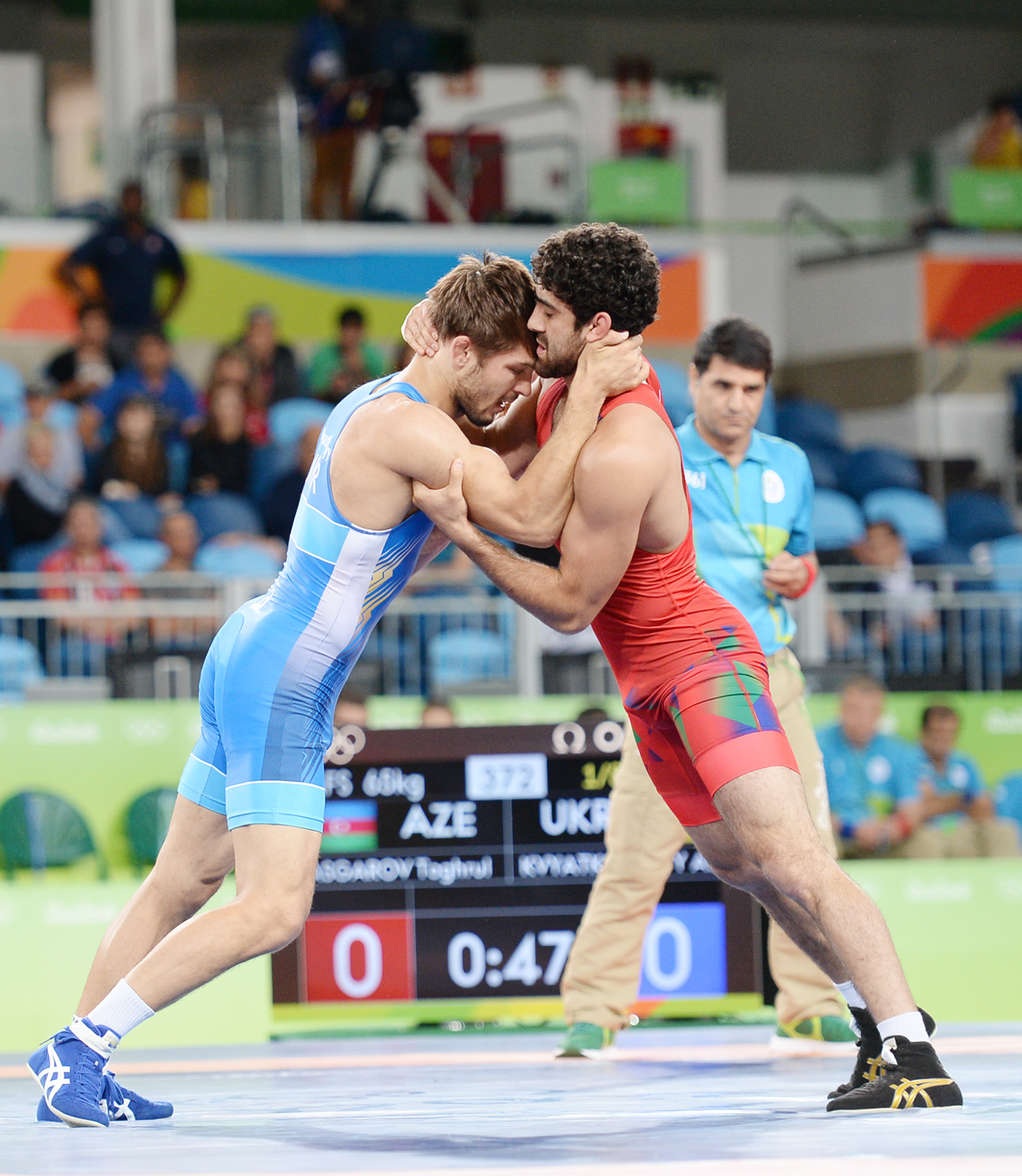
- 2016 Summer Olympics, Asgarov vs Kvyatkovskyy

Personal information
- Native name: Андрій Квятковський
- Nationality: Ukraine
- Born: February 2, 1990 (age 36) Kalush, Ukrainian SSR, Soviet Union
- Height: 173 cm (5 ft 8 in)

Sport
- Country: Ukraine
- Sport: Wrestling
- Weight class: 65-70 kg
- Event: Freestyle
- Club: Lider Lviv
- Coached by: Yuri Kopitko Mariana Kviatkovska

Achievements and titles
- World finals: 5th (2018)
- Regional finals: 5th (2018)
Medal record
Men's freestyle wrestling
Representing Ukraine
Golden Grand Prix Ivan Yarygin
Bronze medal – third place	2018 Krasnoyarsk	70 kg
Ali Aliyev Tournament
Bronze medal – third place	2014 Makhachkala	70 kg
Olympic Qualification Tournament
Silver medal – second place	2016 Zrenjanin	65 kg
Bronze medal – third place	2012 Taiyuan	66 kg
European Juniors Championships
Bronze medal – third place	2010 Samokov	66 kg
European Cadets Championships
Bronze medal – third place	2007 Warsaw	63 kg

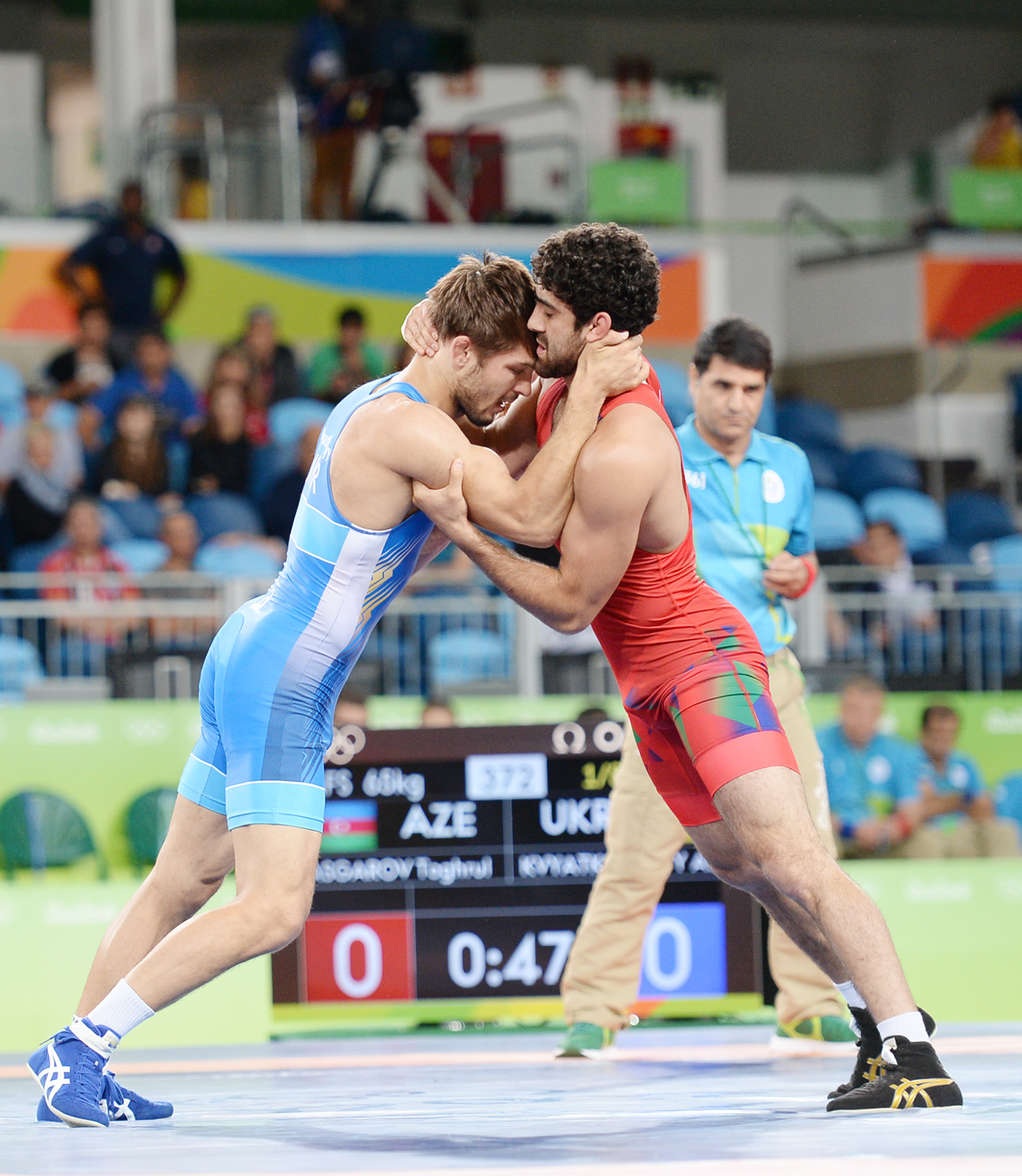

Andriy Kvyatkovskyi (Ukrainian: Андрій Квятковський, also transliterated Andrii Kviatkovskyi, born 2 February 1990 in Kalush) is a Ukrainian freestyle wrestler. He competed in the 66 kg event at the 2012 and 2016 Summer Olympics.

== Career ==
At the 2012 Summer Olympics, he reached the second round, where he lost to Akzhurek Tanatarov.

He competed in the freestyle 70 kg event at the 2016 European Wrestling Championships; after defeating Nicolai Chireacov of Moldova in the round 16, he was eliminated by Azamat Nurykau of Belarus in quarterfinals.

In May 2016, he was provisionally suspended due to use of meldonium. Later that decision was reverted.

During the men's freestyle 65 kg quarterfinals of the 2016 Summer Olympics Kvyatkovskyi bit opponent Frank Molinaro on the forearm and attempted to injure Molinaro with a move designed to break his knee prior.

At the Golden Grand Prix Ivan Yarygin 2018 he won the bronze medal at 70 kilos.
