= Hor Ohannesian =

Ukrainian freestyle wrestler

Personal information
- Full name: Hor Vardanovych Ohannesian
- Nationality: Ukraine
- Born: 7 August 1994 (age 31) Melitopol, Zaporizhzhia Oblast, Ukraine
- Height: 1.72 m (5 ft 7 1/2 in)
- Weight: 65 kg (143 lb)

Sport
- Style: Freestyle
- Club: Armed Forces of Ukraine
- Coach: Valentyn Rusanov
Medal record
Representing Ukraine
European Games
Bronze medal – third place	2019 Minsk	65 kg

Gor Ohannesian (Ukrainian: Гор Варданович Оганнесян; born August 7, 1994, in Melitopol) is a Ukrainian freestyle wrestler. He was a bronze medalist in the 2019 European Games.

== Sports career ==
At the 2017 European Championships, Ohannesian ranked 5th losing in semifinals against Borislav Novachkov from Bulgaria and in bronze medal bout against David Habat from Slovenia. Ohannesian reached round of 16 at the 2017 World Championships.

His first international success came in 2018. He won bronze medal at the 2019 European Games in Minsk. At the tournament, he won against Selahattin Kılıçsallayan from Turkey in the round of 16 and against Abdellatif Mansour from Italy in the quarterfinals. Though he lost to Haji Aliyev from Azerbaijan in the semifinals, he was victorious in the bronze medal bout against Valodya Frangulyan from Armenia. He received a medal from the President of Ukraine for this achievement. 2019 World Championships was not successful for Ohannesian: he lost in the first round against Vazgen Tevanyan from Armenia.

Ohannesian competed for a quota place for the 2020 Summer Olympics. At the World Olympic Qualification Tournament, he reached quarterfinals where he lost to Jordan Oliver from the United States.
