= 2020 Individual Wrestling World Cup – Men's freestyle 70 kg =

The men's freestyle 70 kilograms is a competition featured at the 2020 Individual Wrestling World Cup, and was held in Belgrade, Serbia on 16 and 17 December 2020.

== Medalists ==
Gold	Magomedmurad Gadżijew; Poland
Silver	Haydar Yavuz; Turkey
Bronze	Islambek Orozbekov; Kyrgyzstan
Bronze	Arman Andreasyan; Armenia

== Results ==
Legend

- F — Won by fall
- R — Retired
- WO — Won by walkover

1/16 finals
	Score	
Dániel Antal (HUN)	12–1	Dzianis Salavei (BLR)
Valentin Borzin (MDA)	2–4	Arman Andreasyan (ARM)
Daniel Chomanič (SVK)	0–10	Magomedmurad Gadżijew (POL)

1/8 finals
George Bucur (ROU)	1
Haydar Yavuz (TUR)	3
Mohammad Abdulkareem (KUW)	0
Gitinomagomed Gadzhiyev (AZE)	10
Islambek Orozbekov (KGZ)	WO
~~Eriglent Prizreni (ALB)~~
Shamil Ustaev (GER)	4
Naveen (IND)	8
Mustafa Akhmedov (TJK)	1
Ihor Nykyforuk (UKR)	8
Nicolae Cojocaru (GBR)	0
Chermen Valiev (RUS)	8
~~Haithem Dakhlaoui (TUN)~~
Dániel Antal (HUN)	WO
Arman Andreasyan (ARM)	1
Magomedmurad Gadżijew (POL)	4

Quarterfinals
Haydar Yavuz (TUR)	6
Gitinomagomed Gadzhiyev (AZE)	0
Islambek Orozbekov (KGZ)	12
Naveen (IND)	2
Ihor Nykyforuk (UKR)	0
Chermen Valiev (RUS)	4
Dániel Antal (HUN)	0
Magomedmurad Gadżijew (POL)	10

Semifinals
Haydar Yavuz (TUR)	6
Islambek Orozbekov (KGZ)	0
Chermen Valiev (RUS)
Magomedmurad Gadżijew (POL)	WO

Final
Haydar Yavuz (TUR)	0^{R}
Magomedmurad Gadżijew (POL)	5

Repechage round 1
Daniel Chomanič (SVK)	0
Arman Andreasyan (ARM)	10

Repechage round 2
George Bucur (ROU)	0
Gitinomagomed Gadzhiyev (AZE)	8
Arman Andreasyan (ARM)	7
Dániel Antal (HUN)	0

Bronze medals
Gitinomagomed Gadzhiyev (AZE)	5
Islambek Orozbekov (KGZ)	6
Arman Andreasyan (ARM)	WO
Chermen Valiev (RUS)
