= Murtazali Muslimov =

Azerbaijani freestyle wrestler

Sport
- Country: Azerbaijan
- Sport: Amateur wrestling
- Event: Freestyle
Medal record
Men's freestyle wrestling
Representing Azerbaijan
European Championships
Bronze medal – third place	2018 Kaspiysk	70 kg
Islamic Solidarity Games
Silver medal – second place	2017 Baku	70 kg

Murtazali Muslimov is an Azerbaijani freestyle wrestler. He won one of the bronze medals in the 70 kg event at the 2018 European Wrestling Championships held in Kaspiysk, Russia.

In 2017, he won the silver medal in the 70 kg event at the Islamic Solidarity Games held in Baku, Azerbaijan.

A sample collected from the athlete on 12 July 2019, during the Yasar Dogu, has revealed the presence of the prohibited substances drostanolone metabolite and oxandrolone metabolites. The athlete was suspended for a period of ineligibility of 4 years from 12 July 2019 until 11 July 2023.

== Major results ==
Year	Tournament	Location	Result	Event
2017	Islamic Solidarity Games	Baku, Azerbaijan	2nd	Freestyle 70 kg
2018	European Championships	Kaspiysk, Russia	3rd	Freestyle 70 kg
