= 2018 World Wrestling Championships – Men's freestyle 70 kg =

Men's freestyle 70 kg at the 2018 World Championships
- Venue: László Papp Budapest Sports Arena
- Dates: 22–23 October 2018
- Competitors: 28 from 28 nations

Medalists
| gold medal | Magomedrasul Gazimagomedov | Russia |
| silver medal | Adam Batirov | Bahrain |
| bronze medal | Franklin Marén | Cuba |
| bronze medal | Zurabi Iakobishvili | Georgia |

The men's freestyle 70 kilograms is a competition featured at the 2018 World Wrestling Championships, and was held in Budapest, Hungary on 22 and 23 October.

This freestyle wrestling competition consists of a single-elimination tournament, with a repechage used to determine the winner of two bronze medals. The two finalists face off for gold and silver medals. Each wrestler who loses to one of the two finalists moves into the repechage, culminating in a pair of bronze medal matches featuring the semifinal losers each facing the remaining repechage opponent from their half of the bracket.

Magomedrasul Gazimagomedov from Russia won the gold medal.

== Results ==
Legend

- F — Won by fall

=== Final ===
| Final |
| Adam Batirov (BRN) | 6 |
| Magomedrasul Gazimagomedov (RUS) | 7 |

=== Top half ===
Round of 32
Batyr Borjakow (TKM) | 9
Mihail Georgiev (BUL) | 3
Emrach Gasanov (ISR) | 14
Paul Aguon (GUM) | 4
Norbert Lukács (HUN) | 1
David Safaryan (ARM) | 4
Adam Batirov (BRN) | 5
Franklin Marén (CUB) | 1
Amandyk Bakeyev (KAZ) | 8
Mihail Sava (MDA) | 13

Round of 16
Andriy Kviatkovskyi (UKR) | 4
George Koliev (BLR) | 2
Elaman Dogdurbek Uulu (KGZ) | 10
Batyr Borjakow (TKM) | 0
Emrach Gasanov (ISR) | 0
David Safaryan (ARM) | 10
Adam Batirov (BRN) | 2^{F}
Mihail Sava (MDA) | 0

Quarterfinals
Andriy Kviatkovskyi (UKR) | 6
Elaman Dogdurbek Uulu (KGZ) | 3
David Safaryan (ARM) | 0
Adam Batirov (BRN) | 10

Semifinals
Andriy Kviatkovskyi (UKR) | 0
Adam Batirov (BRN) | 10

=== Bottom half ===
Round of 32
Khadzhimurad Gadzhiyev (AZE) | 5
James Green (USA) | 6
Bat-Erdeniin Byambadorj (MGL) | 10
Dawood Salman (IRQ) | 0
Haislan Garcia (CAN) | 4
Lee Seung-bong (KOR) | 1
Magomedrasul Gazimagomedov (RUS) | 6
Mustafa Kaya (TUR) | 4
Pankaj Rana (IND) | 10
Jarvis Tarkong (PLW) | 0
Ikhtiyor Navruzov (UZB) | 12
Keisuke Otoguro (JPN) | 1
Tajmuraz Salkazanov (SVK) | 7
Younes Emami (IRI) | 7

Round of 16
James Green (USA) | 2
Bat-Erdeniin Byambadorj (MGL) | 4
Haislan Garcia (CAN) | 0
Magomedrasul Gazimagomedov (RUS) | 2
Pankaj Rana (IND) | 0
Ikhtiyor Navruzov (UZB) | 10
Tajmuraz Salkazanov (SVK) | 1
Zurabi Iakobishvili (GEO) | 2

Quarterfinals
Bat-Erdeniin Byambadorj (MGL) | 0
Magomedrasul Gazimagomedov (RUS) | 5
Ikhtiyor Navruzov (UZB) | 1
Zurabi Iakobishvili (GEO) | 5

Semifinals
Magomedrasul Gazimagomedov (RUS) | 3
Zurabi Iakobishvili (GEO) | 1

=== Repechage ===
Repechage round 1
Franklin Marén (CUB) | 10
Mihail Sava (MDA) | 0
Mustafa Kaya (TUR) | 7
Haislan Garcia (CAN) | 1

Repechage round 2
Franklin Marén (CUB) | 12
David Safaryan (ARM) | 2
Mustafa Kaya (TUR) | 6
Bat-Erdeniin Byambadorj (MGL) | 8^{F}

Bronze medals
Franklin Marén (CUB) | 11
Andriy Kviatkovskyi (UKR) | 1
Bat-Erdeniin Byambadorj (MGL) | 0
Zurabi Iakobishvili (GEO) | 10
