= 2018 European Wrestling Championships – Men's freestyle 70 kg =

The men's freestyle 70 kg is a competition featured at the 2018 European Wrestling Championships, and was held in Kaspiysk, Russia on May 4 and May 5.

== Medalists ==
Gold	Magomed Kurbanaliev; Russia
Silver	Magomedmurad Gadzhiev; Poland
Bronze	Zurabi Iakobishvili; Georgia
Bronze	Murtazali Muslimov; Azerbaijan

== Results ==
Legend

- F — Won by fall

=== Main Bracket ===
1/8 finals
Tajmuraz Salkazanov (SVK)	10^{F}
George Bucur (ROU)	0
Andrii Kviatkovskyi (UKR)	4
Magomed Kurbanaliev (RUS)	6
Valter Margaryan (ARM)	10
Maximilian Ausserleitner (AUT)	0
Norbert Lukács (HUN)	1
Miroslav Kirov (BUL)	6
Alexander Semisorow (GER)	8
Murtazali Muslimov (AZE)	9
Magomedmurad Gadzhiev (POL)	6
Azamat Nurykau (BLR)	4
Emrach Gasanov (ISR)	2
Haydar Yavuz (TUR)	12

Quarterfinals
Zurabi Iakobishvili (GEO)	6
Tajmuraz Salkazanov (SVK)	2
Magomed Kurbanaliev (RUS)	9
Valter Margaryan (ARM)	6
Miroslav Kirov (BUL)	2
Murtazali Muslimov (AZE)	7
Magomedmurad Gadzhiev (POL)	6
Haydar Yavuz (TUR)	4

Semifinals
Zurabi Iakobishvili (GEO)	5
Magomed Kurbanaliev (RUS)	5
Murtazali Muslimov (AZE)	2
Magomedmurad Gadzhiev (POL)	3

Final
Magomed Kurbanaliev (RUS)	3
Magomedmurad Gadzhiev (POL)	1

=== Repechage ===
Repechage round 1
Andrii Kviatkovskyi (UKR)	5
Valter Margaryan (ARM)	2
Azamat Nurykau (BLR)	8
Haydar Yavuz (TUR)	6

Bronze medal match
Andrii Kviatkovskyi (UKR)	1
Zurabi Iakobishvili (GEO)	3
Azamat Nurykau (BLR)	2
Murtazali Muslimov (AZE)	9
