= 2017 European Wrestling Championships – Men's freestyle 65 kg =

The men's freestyle 65 kg is a competition featured at the 2017 European Wrestling Championships, and was held in Novi Sad, Serbia on May 3.

== Medalists ==
| Gold | Ilyas Bekbulatov; Russia |
| Silver | Borislav Novachkov; Bulgaria |
| Bronze | David Habat; Slovenia |
| Bronze | Zurabi Iakobishvili; Georgia |

== Results ==
Legend

- F — Won by fall

=== Final ===
| Final |
| Borislav Novachkov (BUL) | 0 |
| Ilyas Bekbulatov (RUS) | 10 |

=== Top half ===
==== Section 1 ====
Round of 32

Round of 16
Viktar Serada (BLR) | 4
Maxime Fiquet (FRA) | 3
Borislav Novachkov (BUL) | 6
David Habat (SLO) | 2
Maxim Prepeliță (MDA) | 3
Hor Ohannesian (UKR) | 5
Emrach Gasanov (ISR) | 1
Norbert Lukács (HUN) | 5

Quarterfinals
Viktar Serada (BLR) | 0
Borislav Novachkov (BUL) | 2^{F}
Hor Ohannesian (UKR) | 10
Norbert Lukács (HUN) | 0

Semifinals
Borislav Novachkov (BUL) | 8
Hor Ohannesian (UKR) | 0

=== Bottom half ===
Round of 32
George Bucur (ROU) | 12
Gabriel Janatsch (AUT) | 2
Zurabi Iakobishvili (GEO) | 10
Perica Dimitrijević (SRB) | 0
Narek Sirunyan (ARM) | 0
Alexander Semisorow (GER) | 11

Round of 16
Elbrus Čertkojev (SVK) | 0
Ilyas Bekbulatov (RUS) | 12
Gitinomagomed Gadzhiyev (AZE) | 4
Krzysztof Bieńkowski (POL) | 1
Mustafa Kaya (TUR) | 5
George Bucur (ROU) | 2
Zurabi Iakobishvili (GEO) | 4
Alexander Semisorow (GER) | 2

Quarterfinals
Ilyas Bekbulatov (RUS) | 10
Gitinomagomed Gadzhiyev (AZE) | 0
Mustafa Kaya (TUR) | 0
Zurabi Iakobishvili (GEO) | 11

Semifinals
Ilyas Bekbulatov (RUS) | 10
Zurabi Iakobishvili (GEO) | 0

=== Repechage ===
Repechage round 2
David Habat (SLO) | 14
Viktar Serada (BLR) | 4
Elbrus Čertkojev (SVK) | 6
Gitinomagomed Gadzhiyev (AZE) | 8

Bronze medals
David Habat (SLO) | 11
Hor Ohannesian (UKR) | 3
Gitinomagomed Gadzhiyev (AZE) | 4
Zurabi Iakobishvili (GEO) | 9
