= Islambek Orozbekov =

Kyrgyzstani freestyle wrestler

Personal information
- Native name: Исламбек Орозбеков
- Nationality: Kyrgyzstan
- Born: 1996 (age 29–30)
- Height: 170 cm (5 ft 7 in)

Sport
- Country: Kyrgyzstan
- Sport: Amateur wrestling
- Weight class: 70 kg
- Event: Freestyle
Medal record
Men's freestyle wrestling
Representing Kyrgyzstan
Individual World Cup
Bronze medal – third place	2020 Belgrade	70 kg
Asian Championships
Bronze medal – third place	2020 New Delhi	70 kg
Bronze medal – third place	2021 Almaty	70 kg
Bronze medal – third place	2022 Ulaanbaatar	74 kg
Yasar Dogu Tournament
Bronze medal – third place	2022 Istanbul	74 kg

Islambek Orozbekov is a Kyrgyzstani freestyle wrestler. He is a three-time bronze medalist at the Asian Wrestling Championships.

== Career ==
In 2020, Orozbekov won one of the bronze medals in the 70 kg event at the Individual Wrestling World Cup held in Belgrade, Serbia.

In 2022, Orozbekov won one of the bronze medals in his event at the Yasar Dogu Tournament held in Istanbul, Turkey. He competed in the 74 kg event at the 2022 World Wrestling Championships held in Belgrade, Serbia.

== Achievements ==
Year	Tournament	Location	Result	Event
2020	Asian Championships	New Delhi, India	3rd	Freestyle 70 kg
2021	Asian Championships	Almaty, Kazakhstan	3rd	Freestyle 70 kg
2022	Asian Championships	Ulaanbaatar, Mongolia	3rd	Freestyle 74 kg
