= Gurbuki =

Gurbuki Гурбуки ГъурбукIи
- Selo
- Location within Republic of Dagestan Location within Russia
- Coordinates: 42°36′N 47°35′E
- Country: Russia
- Region: Republic of Dagestan
- District: Karabudakhkentsky District
- Time zone: UTC+3:00

Gurbuki (Russian: Гурбуки; Dargwa: ГъурбукIи) is a rural locality (a selo) in Karabudakhkentsky District, Republic of Dagestan, Russia. The population was 5,322 as of 2010. There are 56 streets.

== Geography ==
Gurbuki is located 14 km south of Karabudakhkent (the district's administrative centre) by road. Gubden and Karabudakhkent are the nearest rural localities.

== Nationalities ==
Dargins live there.
