= Akzhurek Tanatarov =

Kazakh freestyle wrestler

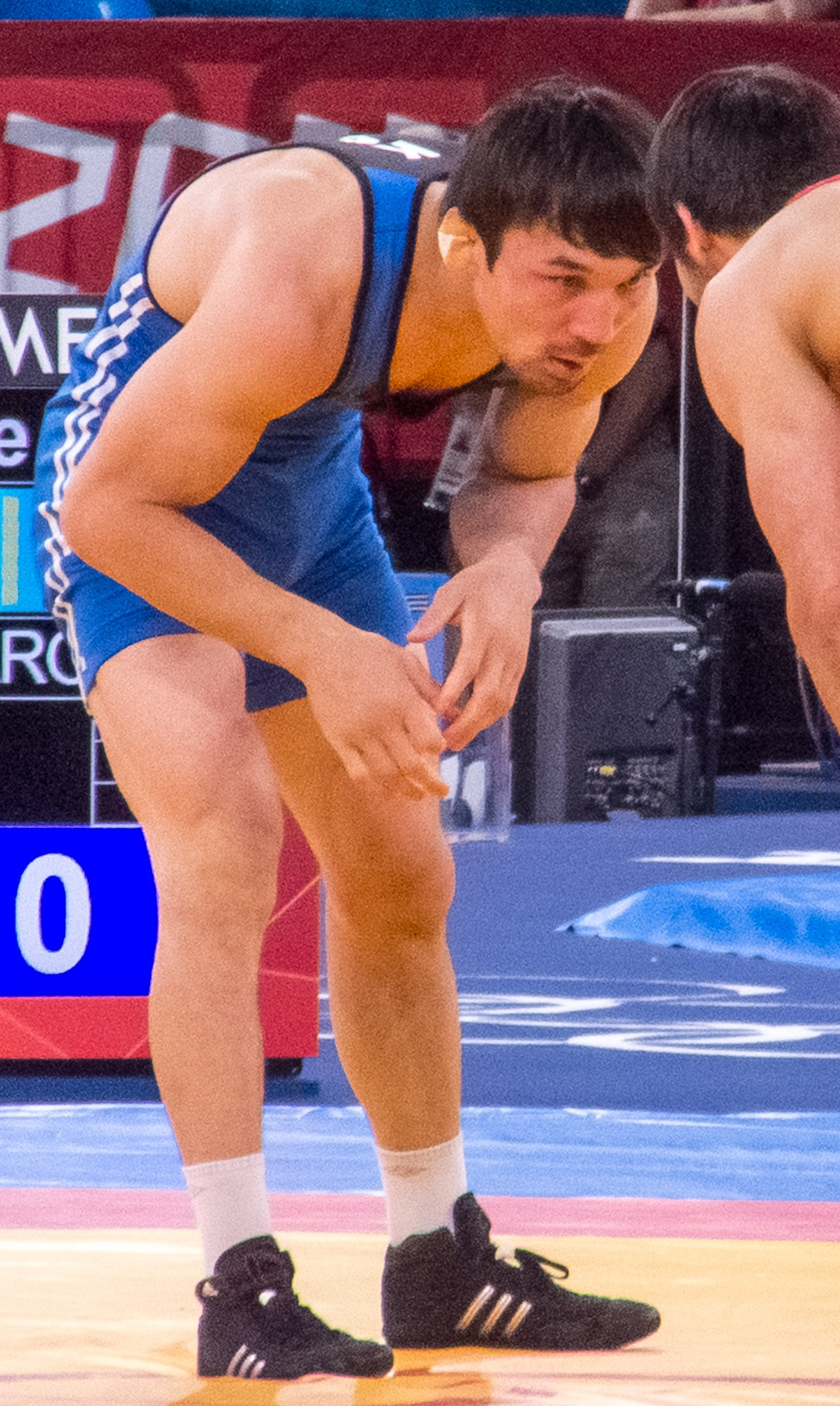
- Akzhurek Tanatarov in 2012

Personal information
- Native name: Ақжүрек Достықұлы Таңатаров;
- Full name: Akzhurek Dostykuly Tanatarov
- Nationality: Kazakhstan
- Born: 15 August 1985 (age 40) Alma-Ata, Kazakh SSR, Soviet Union
- Height: 170 cm (5 ft 7 in)

Sport
- Country: Kazakhstan
- Sport: Wrestling
- Weight class: 66-70 kg
- Event: Freestyle
- Club: national team of Kazakhstan
Medal record
Men's freestyle wrestling
Representing Kazakhstan
Olympic Games
Bronze medal – third place	2012 London	66 kg
World Championships
Bronze medal – third place	2017 Paris	70 kg
Asian Championships
Gold medal – first place	2017 New Delhi	70 kg

Akzhurek Dostykuly Tanatarov (Kazakh: Ақжүрек Достықұлы Таңатаров; born 3 September 1986) is a Kazakh freestyle wrestler. At the 2012 Summer Olympics he was defeated in the semifinal round of the 66 kg freestyle event by Sushil Kumar of India. Kumar, who was beaten in the final by Japan's Tatsuhiro Yonemitsu after losing the first two rounds, had entered the final amid some controversy. The Kazakh athlete claimed Kumar had bitten his ear, which was denied by the latter.

Tanatarov won a bronze medal in the repechage round, beating Ramazan Şahin in his bronze medal match.
