= Zurabi Iakobishvili =

Georgian freestyle wrestler

Zurabi Iakobishvili ზურაბ იაკობიშვილი
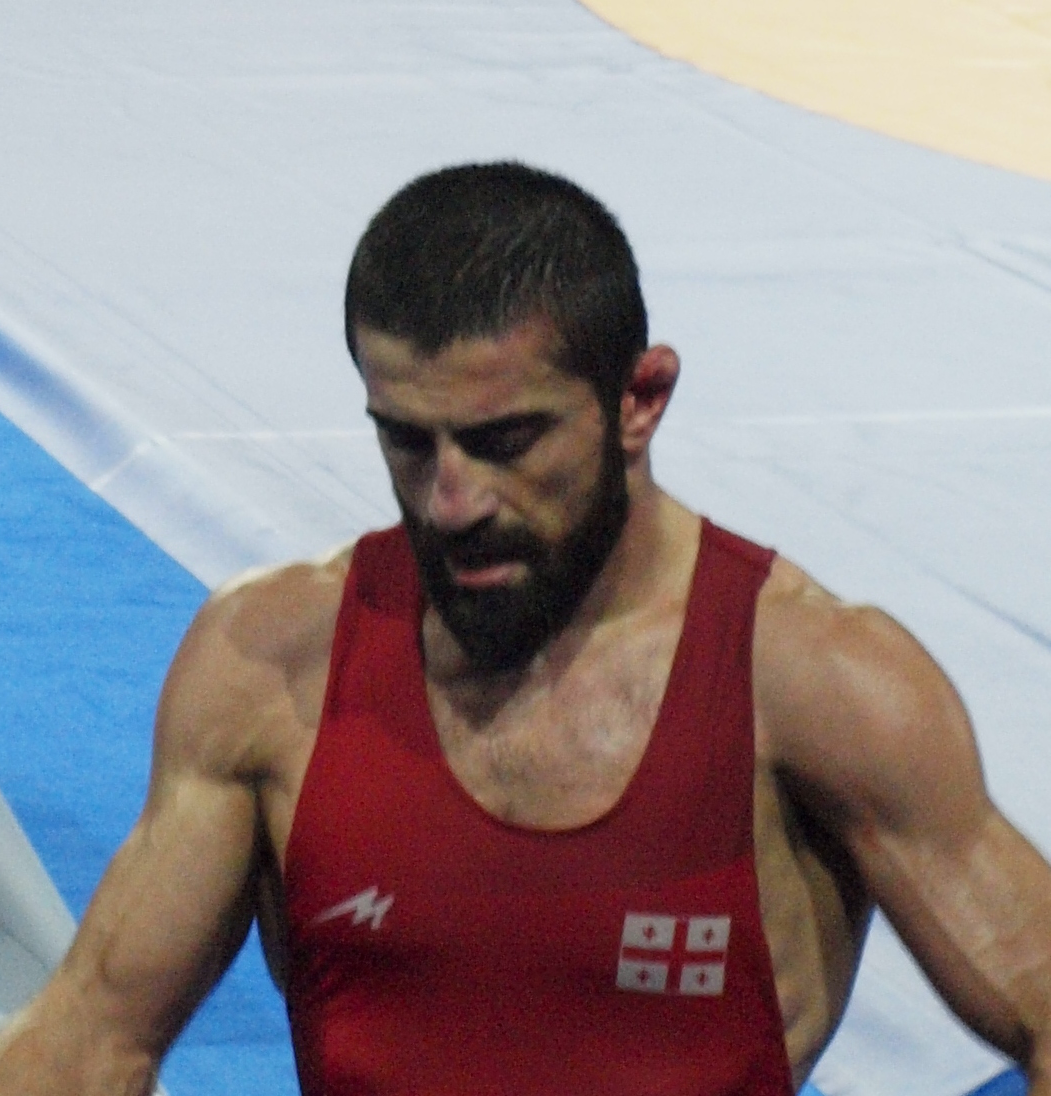
- Iakobishvili at the 2021 World Wrestling Championships in Oslo, Norway

Personal information
- Native name: ზურაბ იაკობიშვილი
- Born: Zurabi Iakobishvili; 4 February 1992 (age 34) Kvareli, Georgia
- Height: 173 cm (5 ft 8 in)

Sport
- Country: Georgia
- Sport: Wrestling
- Weight class: 70 kg
- Event: Freestyle
- Coached by: Givi Metreveli; since 2000 - David Otiashvili, since 2009
- Now coaching: Grace Bullen

Achievements and titles
- World finals: (gold) (2017)
- Regional finals: (gold) (2022)
Medal record
Men's freestyle Wrestling
Representing Georgia
World Championships
Gold medal – first place	2017 Paris	65 kg
Bronze medal – third place	2018 Budapest	70 kg
Bronze medal – third place	2021 Oslo	70 kg
Bronze medal – third place	2022 Belgrade	70 kg
European Championships
Gold medal – first place	2022 Budapest	70 kg
Bronze medal – third place	2017 Novi Sad	65 kg
Bronze medal – third place	2018 Kaspiysk	70 kg
European U23 Championships
Silver medal – second place	2015 Walbrzych	65 kg

Zurabi Iakobishvili (Georgian: ზურაბ იაკობიშვილი; born February 4, 1992) is a Georgian freestyle wrestler and wrestling coach. He is a World Championships gold and three-time bronze medallist, and European Championships gold and two-time bronze medallist. Iakobishvili won the gold medal in the freestyle 65 kg event at the 2017 World Championships and the freestyle 70 kg event at the 2022 European Championships. He is currently the head coach of the Norwegian female national wrestling team.

Iakobishvili won bronze medals in the freestyle 70 kg event at the World Championships in 2018, 2021 and 2022, and the freestyle 65 kg event and freestyle 70 kg event at the 2017 and 2018 European Championships respectively. He's also a European U23 Championships silver medallist. Iakobishvili competed in the men's freestyle 65 kg event at the 2016 Summer Olympics in Rio, where he reached the quarterfinals and placed tenth.

== Career ==
Iakobishvili competed at his first senior European Championships at the 2016 Championships in Riga, where he placed fifth in the freestyle 65 kg event. He represented Georgia at the 2016 Summer Olympics in Rio and competed in the men's freestyle 65 kg event, where he reached the quarterfinals and placed tenth. Iakobishvili placed third in the freestyle 65 kg event at the 2017 European Championships in Novi Sad and won the gold medal in the freestyle 65 kg event at the 2017 World Championships in Paris.

Iakobishvili switched to the 70 kg weight class for the 2018 European Championships in Kaspiysk, where he won a bronze medal. That same year, he won the gold medal in the freestyle 70 kg event at the Tbilisi Grand Prix and Poland Open. He placed third in the freestyle 70 kg event at the 2018 World Championships in Budapest. In 2019, he placed 13th at the European Championships in Bucharest and fifth at the World Championships in Nur-Sultan in the freestyle 70 kg.

In 2021, Iakobishvili won a bronze medal in the freestyle 70 kg event at the World Championships in Oslo. The following year, he won the gold medal in the freestyle 70 kg event at the European Championships in Budapest, and a bronze medal at the World Championships in Belgrade and the Yasar Dogu Tournament in Istanbul.

In 2022, Iakobishvili began coaching Norwegian freestyle wrestler Grace Bullen and coached her to a silver medal at the 2022 World Championships. Bullen won a silver medal at the 2023 European Championships and a bronze medal at the 2023 World Championships. Iakobishvili coached Bullen to a gold medal at the 2024 European Championships and a bronze medal in the women's freestyle 62 kg event at the 2024 Summer Olympics. He became the head coach of the Norwegian female national wrestling team in October 2024.
