= Adam Batirov =

Russian-Bahraini freestyle wrestler (born 1985)

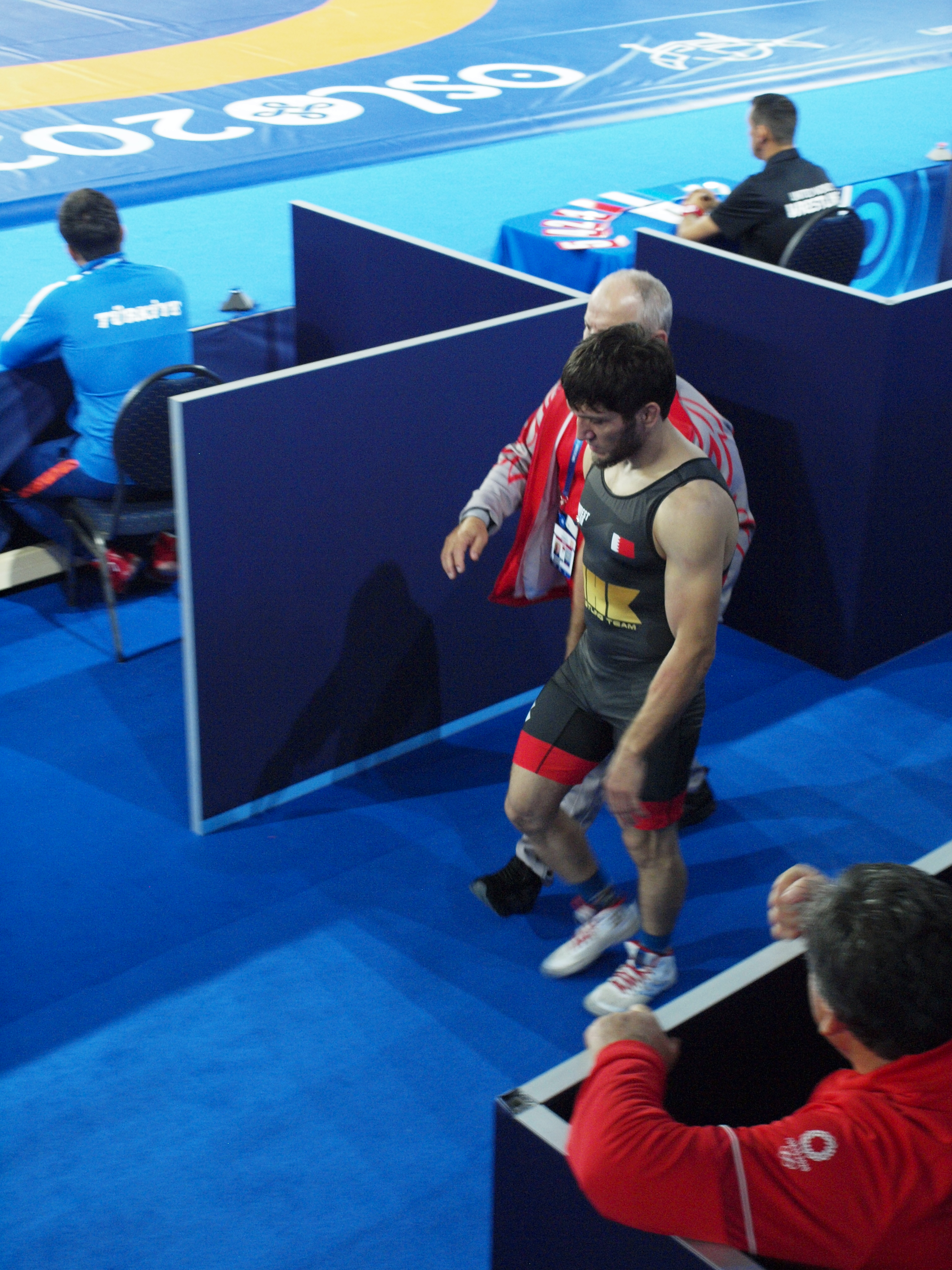
- Adam at the 2021 World Championships in Oslo, Norway

Personal information
- Full name: Adam Alavdinovich Batirov
- Nationality: Bahrain; Russia
- Born: January 13, 1985 (age 41) Khasavyurt, Dagestan, Russia
- Height: 1.65 m (5 ft 5 in)
- Weight: 74 kg (163 lb)

Sport
- Country: Bahrain
- Sport: Wrestling
- Weight class: 74 kg
- Event: Freestyle
- Club: Shamil Umakhanov Wrestling Club (им. Шамиля Умаханова); KHK MMA; Armor Functional Training Center
- Coached by: Saigidpasha Umakhanov, Abdurakhman Mirzaev, Salim Nutsalkhanov, Ali Akhmedov
Medal record
Men's freestyle wrestling
Representing Bahrain
World Championships
| Silver medal – second place | 2018 Budapest | 70 kg |
Asian Championships
| Gold medal – first place | 2016 Bangkok | 70 kg |
| Bronze medal – third place | 2019 Xi'an | 74 kg |
Islamic Solidarity Games
| Bronze medal – third place | 2017 Baku | 70 kg |
Representing Russia
World Cup
| Bronze medal – third place | 2010 Moscow | 66 kg |
European Championships
| Bronze medal – third place | 2011 Dortmund | 60 kg |
| Silver medal – second place | 2009 Vilnius | 60 kg |
| Silver medal – second place | 2004 Ankara | 55 kg |
Russian Championships
| Silver medal – second place | 2012 St.Petersburg | 66 kg |
| Gold medal – first place | 2011 Yakutsk | 66 kg |
| Bronze medal – third place | 2009 Kazan | 66 kg |
| Gold medal – first place | 2007 Moscow | 60 kg |
| Silver medal – second place | 2004 Saint Petersburg | 55 kg |
Golden Grand Prix Ivan Yarygin
| Gold medal – first place | 2007 Krasnoyarsk | 66 kg |
| Gold medal – first place | 2009 Krasnoyarsk | 60 kg |
| Gold medal – first place | 2011 Krasnoyarsk | 66 kg |
| Bronze medal – third place | 2012 Krasnoyarsk | 66 kg |
Junior World Championships
| Silver medal – second place | 2003 Istanbul | 55 kg |
Junior European Championships
| Silver medal – second place | 2002 Tirana | 50 kg |
Cadet World Championships
| Silver medal – second place | 2004 Ankara | 55 kg |
Cadet European Championships
| Gold medal – first place | 2002 Vilnius | 50 kg |
| Gold medal – first place | 2001 İzmir | 46 kg |

Adam Alavdinovich Batirov (Russian: Адам Алавдинович Бати́ров, Avar: ГӀалаудинил Адам Батиров; born 13 January 1985) is a Russian and Bahraini former freestyle wrestler. He is a world cadet championships runner-up and Cadet European Champion (2002). He thrice won the Ivan Yarygin tournament and was 2007 national Russian national champion. In 2009, he won his first European Championships. At the 2016 Asian Wrestling Championships he won the gold medal, where he beat Kumar Vinod of India in the final match. He is a 2018 World Championships runner-up.

Adam is the younger brother of two-time Olympic Champion Mavlet Batirov. After winning 2016 World Wrestling Olympic Qualification Tournament 1, he competed for Bahrain which led to its qualification for the 2016 Summer Olympics. There he lost in the first round to Ikhtiyor Navruzov from Uzbekistan.

At the 2018 World Championships, he placed second, in the final match he lost to his countryman Magomedrasul Gazimagomedov by scores.
