= Israil Kasumov =

Russian wrestler (born 1990)

Israil Kasumov Исраил Касумов
Personal information
- Native name: Касумов Исраил Аслудиевич
- Full name: Israil Asludievich Kasumov
- Nationality: (Russia) Russian
- Born: June 2, 1990 (age 36) Serzhen-Yurt, Shalinsky District, Checheno-Ingush SSR, Russian SSR
- Height: 172 cm (5 ft 8 in)
- Weight: 74 kg (163 lb)

Sport
- Country: (Russia) Russian
- Sport: Wrestling
- Weight class: 70 kg
- Rank: International Master of Sports of Russia in freestyle wrestling
- Event: Freestyle
- Club: Olympic Wrestling Reserve, Moscow and Akhmat Wrestling Club, Grozny
- Coached by: V. Alekseev, A. Manuylov, A. Buzin
Medal record
Men's freestyle wrestling
Representing Russia
European Championships
Gold medal – first place	2021 Warsaw	70 kg
Bronze medal – third place	2017 Novi Sad	70 kg
Bronze medal – third place	2016 Riga	65 kg
European Cadets Championships
Bronze medal – third place	2007 Warsaw	63 kg
Representing Krasnoyarsk Krai
Russian National Championships
Gold medal – first place	2022 Kyzyl	70 kg
Gold medal – first place	2021 Ulan-Ude	70 kg
Silver medal – second place	2016 Yakutsk	65 kg
Silver medal – second place	2015 Kaspiysk	70 kg
Silver medal – second place	2014 Yakutsk	70 kg
Golden Grand Prix Ivan Yarygin
Gold medal – first place	2020 Krasnoyarsk	70 kg
Gold medal – first place	2017 Krasnoyarsk	70 kg
Gold medal – first place	2016 Krasnoyarsk	65 kg
Gold medal – first place	2014 Krasnoyarsk	70 kg
Bronze medal – third place	2015 Krasnoyarsk	70 kg
Bronze medal – third place	2011 Krasnoyarsk	66 kg

Israil Asludievich Kasumov (Russian: Касумов, Исраил Аслудиевич; born 2 June 1990 in Serzhen-Yurt.) is a Russian freestyle wrestler of Chechen ethnicity. Kasumov is a four-time Ivan Yarygin Golden Grand Prix gold-medallist, from 2014, 2016, 2017 and 2020) and the 2021 European Champion, which took place in Warsaw, Poland
