= Andrei Karpach =

Belarusian freestyle wrestler

Personal information
- Born: 6 June 1994 (age 32)
- Height: 175 cm (5 ft 9 in)

Sport
- Country: Belarus
- Sport: Amateur wrestling
- Event: Freestyle
Medal record
Men's freestyle wrestling
Representing Belarus
European Championships
Bronze medal – third place	2018 Kaspiysk	74 kg

Andrei Karpach (born 6 June 1994) is a Belarusian freestyle wrestler. He won one of the bronze medals in the 74 kg event at the 2018 European Wrestling Championships held in Kaspiysk, Russia.

== Achievements ==
Year	Tournament	Location	Result	Event
2018	European Championships	Kaspiysk, Russia	3rd	Freestyle 74 kg
