= Mihail Sava =

Moldovan freestyle wrestler

Personal information
- Native name: Mihail Sava
- Nationality: Moldova
- Born: 3 September 1991 (age 34)
- Height: 167 cm (5 ft 6 in)
- Weight: 72 kg (159 lb)

Sport
- Country: Moldova
- Sport: Amateur wrestling
- Weight class: 65–70 kg
- Event: Freestyle
Medal record
Men's freestyle wrestling
Representing Moldova
World Championships
Bronze medal – third place	2014 Tashkent	65 kg
European Championships
Bronze medal – third place	2020 Rome	70 kg
World University Championships
Silver medal – second place	2016 Corum	65 kg
Bronze medal – third place	2014 Pecs	65 kg

Mihail Sava (born 3 September 1991) is a Moldovan freestyle wrestler. He won one of the bronze medals in the 70 kg event at the 2020 European Wrestling Championships held in Rome, Italy.

== Career ==
In 2014, he won one of the bronze medals in the 65 kg event at the World Wrestling Championships held in Tashkent, Uzbekistan. In his bronze medal match he defeated Mustafa Kaya of Turkey.

In 2015, he competed in the men's freestyle 65 kg event at the European Games without winning a medal. In 2016, he won the silver medal in the men's 65 kg event at the 2016 World University Wrestling Championships held in Çorum, Turkey. He also competed in the 70 kg event at the 2018 World Wrestling Championships without winning a medal. He was eliminated in his second match by Adam Batirov.

== Achievements ==
Year	Tournament	Venue	Result	Event
2014	World Championships	Tashkent, Uzbekistan	3rd	Freestyle 65 kg
2020	European Championships	Rome, Italy	3rd	Freestyle 70 kg
