= Semen Radulov =

Ukrainian freestyle wrestler

Medal record

Representing Ukraine

Men's Freestyle Wrestling

European Championships
Bronze medal – third place	2016 Riga	65 kg

Summer Universiade
Bronze medal – third place	2013 Kazan	66 kg

Semen Radulov (born 30 August 1989, in Odessa) is a Ukrainian freestyle wrestler. He won a bronze medal in the 2016 European Wrestling Championships held in Riga, Latvia. He is an ethnic Gagauz.
