= Aghahuseyn Mustafayev =

Azerbaijani freestyle wrestler (born 1989)

Ağahüseyn Mustafayev
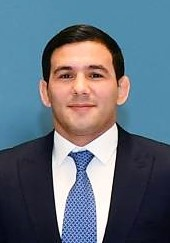

Personal information
- Native name: Ağahüseyn Mustafayev
- Born: 11 April 1989 (age 37)
- Height: 167 cm (5 ft 6 in)

Sport
- Country: Azerbaijan
- Sport: Amateur wrestling
- Weight class: 70 kg
- Event: Freestyle
Medal record
Men's freestyle wrestling
Representing Azerbaijan
European Championships
Silver medal – second place	2019 Bucharest	70 kg
Silver medal – second place	2020 Rome	70 kg
Military World Games
Bronze medal – third place	2015 Mungyeong	65 kg

Ağahüseyn Mustafayev (born 11 April 1989) is an Azerbaijani freestyle wrestler. He won the silver medal in the 70 kg event at the 2020 European Wrestling Championships held in Rome, Italy. In 2019, he also won the silver medal in this event.

In 2013, he competed at the Summer Universiade held in Kazan, Russia without winning a medal. He represented Azerbaijan at the 2015 Military World Games where he won one of the bronze medals in the 65 kg event.

== Achievements ==
Year	Tournament	Venue	Result	Event
2015	Military World Games	Mungyeong, South Korea	3rd	Freestyle 65 kg
2016	Military World Championships	Skopje, North Macedonia	1st	Freestyle 65 kg
2019	European Championships	Bucharest, Romania	2nd	Freestyle 70 kg
2020	European Championships	Rome, Italy	2nd	Freestyle 70 kg
