= Zaurbek Sidakov =

Russian freestyle wrestler

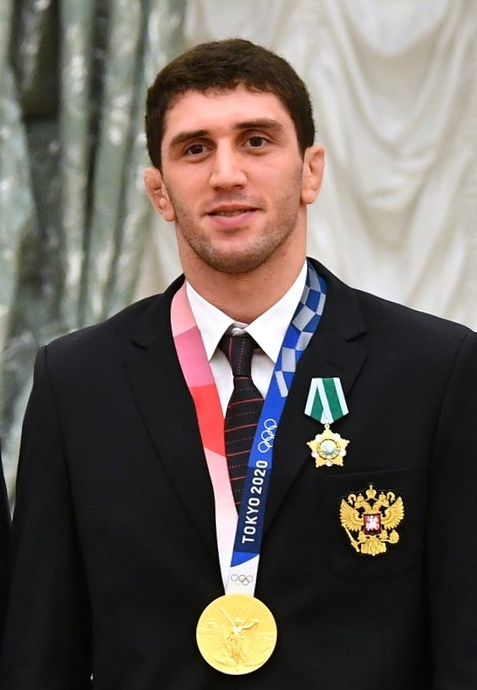
- Sidakov in 2021

Personal information
- Native name: Заурбек Казбекович Сидаков
- Full name: Zaurbek Kazbekovhich Sidakov
- Nickname: Sidr
- Nationality: Russia
- Born: 14 March 1996 (age 30) Beslan, North Ossetia–Alania, Russia
- Height: 1.77 m (5 ft 10 in)

Sport
- Country: Russia
- Sport: Wrestling
- Weight class: 74 kg
- Rank: International Master of Sport in Freestyle Wrestling
- Event: Freestyle
- Club: Wrestling Academy of Aslan Khadarstev; CSKA Wrestling Club
- Coached by: Totraz Archegov; Elbrus Dudaev

Achievements and titles
- Olympic finals: (gold) (2020)
- World finals: (gold) (2018) (gold) (2019) (gold) (2023) (bronze) (2025)
- Regional finals: (silver) (2025)
Medal record
Representing (Russia) ROC
Olympic Games
Gold medal – first place	2020 Tokyo	74 kg
Representing UWW
World Championships
Bronze medal – third place	2025 Zagreb	74 kg
European Championships
Silver medal – second place	2025 Bratislava	74 kg
Representing Russia
World Championships
Gold medal – first place	2018 Budapest	74 kg
Gold medal – first place	2019 Nur-Sultan	74 kg
Gold medal – first place	2023 Belgrade	74 kg
World Cup
Gold medal – first place	2019 Yakutsk	74 kg
European Games
Gold medal – first place	2019 Minsk	74kg
World Military Championships
Gold medal – first place	2018 Moscow	74 kg
European U23 Championships
Gold medal – first place	2018 Istanbul	74 kg
Silver medal – second place	2017 Szombathely	70 kg
World Juniors Championships
Bronze medal – third place	2015 Salvador da Bahia	66 kg
European Juniors Championships
Silver medal – second place	2016 Bucharest	74 kg
Representing (North Ossetia–Alania) North Ossetia
Golden Grand Prix Ivan Yarygin
Gold medal – first place	2016 Krasnoyarsk	70 kg
Gold medal – first place	2019 Krasnoyarsk	74 kg
Gold medal – first place	2023 Krasnoyarsk	74 kg
Gold medal – first place	2025 Krasnoyarsk	74 kg
Silver medal – second place	2017 Krasnoyarsk	70 kg
Silver medal – second place	2018 Krasnoyarsk	74 kg
Bronze medal – third place	2015 Krasnoyarsk	65 kg
Bronze medal – third place	2026 Krasnoyarsk	74 kg
Russian National Championships
Gold medal – first place	2016 Yakutsk	70 kg
Gold medal – first place	2018 Odintsovo	74 kg
Gold medal – first place	2021 Ulan-Ude	74 kg
Bronze medal – third place	2020 Naro-Fominsk	74 kg

Zaurbek Kazbekovhich Sidakov (Note: Russian: Заурбек Казбекович Сидаков pronounced [zəʊrˈbʲek sʲɪˈdakəf] Iron Ossetic: Сидахъаты Хъазыбеджы-фырт Зауырбег, romanized: Sidakati Kazibejifirt Zaurbeg) (born 14 March 1996) is a Russian freestyle wrestler, who competes at 74 kilograms. Sidakov is the 2020 Olympic champion in the 74 kg and a three-time World Champion, claiming his titles in 2018 and 2019 and 2023.

Sidakov is also a European Games Gold medalist, World Cup champion, three-time Russian National Champion, three-time Ivan Yarygin International champion (four-time finalist, five-time medalist), Military World Champion and U23 European Champion (two-time finalist).

Sidakov has supported the Russian invasion of Ukraine by participating in a pro-war rally in Luzhniki Stadium in March 2022.

== Beslan terrorist attack ==
On September 1st 2004, the school Sidakov attended – School no.1 in Beslan – was overtaken by Chechen terrorists in the Beslan school siege, which resulted in over 1,100 victims being held hostage and 334 victims murdered by Chechen terrorists over a three-day period where they would be held in the school's gym-hall without any food or water. Despite being children at the time, they understood what was happening when being evacuated from school, said Sidakov and he had friends and training partners who were being held as hostages. Future Olympic Wrestling teammate Artur Naifonov, a bronze medalist, also survived the siege.

== Wrestling career ==
=== 2018 ===
Sidakov has won many medals throughout his career; he has won bronze, two silvers and three gold medals at the Ivan Yarygin Golden Grand Prix from 2015 to 2023 – most recently, a gold at the Ivan Yarygin 2023. In 2016 he captured his first gold medal at the Grand Prix by defeating Russian National champion, Khusein Suyunchev. At the 2018 Yarygin Grand Prix, Zidakov entered at the quarter-final round and wrestled Turkish wrestler Muhammet Demir and won by 13–2 technical fall, in the semi-final round; he faced fellow training partner and Ossetian, Khakhaber Khubezthy by 5–0, thus advancing to the final round. Sidakov faced another training partner of his, Khetag Tsabolov and lost after giving up a last minute takedown, and lost by the score of 1–3, ultimately resulting in Sidakov taking the silver medal.

==== 2018 Russian National Championships ====
Sidakov entered the 2018 Russian National Freestyle Wrestling Championships in Odintsovo, Moscow Oblast in August 2018. In the round of 16, he defeated Konstantin Korolyov of Krasnoyarsk by 14–1 technical fall; Sidakov went on to defeat Magomed Magomedov of Moscow by 9–0 in the round of 8. In the quarter-finals, Sidakov defeated Timur Bizhoev of Krasnodar by 3–1 and advanced to the semi-finals where he defeated Evgeny Lapishov of Tatarstan by 10–0 technical superiority, thus advancing Sidakov to the finals, where he would face former opponent and training partner, Khetag Tsabolov. Sidakov ultimately got his revenge and the gold medal this time, as he won by 2–2 criteria scoring a takedown in the last 30 seconds.

==== 2018 World Championships ====
Sidakov made his first appearance on the world stage when he entered the 2018 World Championships in Budapest, Hungary. In Sidakov's opening match, he faced and defeated Bulgaria's Miroslav Kirov by 10–0 technical-fall, and then defeated Franklin Gomez to advance to the quarter-finals. In the quarter-final, he beat NCAA champion, Olympic gold medalist and four-time world champion Jordan Burroughs 6–5, and Sidakov then beat Olympic Bronze medalist, and two-time European and World champion, Frank Chamizo by 3–2, advancing Sidakov to the final, opposite Georgia's Avtandil Kentchadze, a 2018 U23 European Championships Bronze Medalist – whom Sidakov defeated at the U23 Senior European Championships in the semi-final. After a hard-fought match between Sidakov and Kentchadze, Sidakov won by the score of 2*-2; winning by criteria; the gold medal; first place on the podium and his first senior world title.

=== 2019 ===
In 2019, World Champion Sidakov returned to the annually held Ivan Yarygin tournament in Krasnoyarsk. Zaurbek stormed his way into the finals, where he wrestled against Yakup Gor of Turkey, whom he defeated 5–4 to capture the gold medal.

In March, Sidakov was part of the Russian team at the Freestyle Wrestling World Cup held in Yakutsk. Sidakov, who was part of the first team, faced four-time World Championships medalist, Geandry Garzon of Cuba, whom Sidakov quickly dispatched by fall as a result of a well-timed cradle from a defended single leg. In Sidakov's second match, he wrestled Iranian Reza Afzali, whom Sidakov defeated by 6–0. Russia would then go on to win the World Cup with a score of 9–1 against Iran.

==== 2019 European Games ====
Sidakov was then placed on the Russian squad to wrestle at the 2019 European Games held in the capital of Belarus, Minsk. Entering into the tournament, Sidakov first met rival Avtandil Kentchadze of Georgia, who he defeated by the score of 5–3. In the semi-finals, Sidakov faced Azamat Nurykau and defeated him by a score of 6–4. In the final, Sidakov wrestled with three-time European Champion and World medalist, Soner Demirtaş of Turkey. After a minute of hand-fighting, Sidakov would shoot a single-leg causing Demirtas to sprawl out, after turning away, Sidakov would lock in a cradle and would go on to pin Demirtaş, declaring Sidakov the victory by fall, giving Sidakov the gold medal at the European Games.

==== 2019 World Championships ====
At the 2019 World Championships, Sidakov first defeated Mexican representative, Victor Hernandez, by a technical fall, 10–0. He went on defeating Kamil Rybycki 8–0 and Mao Okui, Japanese Academic World medalist, in the quarter-finals by a score of 6–0. In the semi-finals, Sidakov faced four-time World Champion and former Olympic Champion, Jordan Burroughs – a rematch of the 2018 World Wrestling Championships quarter-finals – and won in the same fashion as he did in 2018, by a last-second step-out to score 4–3. In 2019, Sidakov once again defeated Burroughs with a last-second step-out and after a failed challenge for a score of 4–3.

In what would be a rematch of the 2018 World Championships semi-finals, Sidakov faced two-time World Champion, Frank Chamizo, in the final. Sidakov used his tie-ups and hand-fighting to control most of the match, leaving Chamizo without any scoring chances; Chamizo was put on the shot-clock giving Sidakov a one-point lead for passivity at the half-way point. In the second period, Chamizo found a way to a single leg takedown and finish it for two-points to lead by a score of 2–1. After being down, Sidakov almost immediately began applying more pressure and managed to get a takedown of his own around 20 seconds later; leading 3–2, in the last twenty seconds, he would land another brief two-point takedown and defended his world title by a score of 5–2, ultimately resulting in Sidakov become a two-time Wrestling World Champion. Following his victory at the World Championships, Sidakov dedicated his victory to all those deceased as a result of the 2004 Beslan terrorist school attack.

=== 2020 ===
==== 2020 Russian National Championships ====
Following the ongoing COVID-19 pandemic, many of the wrestling tournaments had been cancelled nationally and internationally; thus Sidakov's first tournament in over a year would be at the 2020 Russian National Freestyle Wrestling Championships. In Sidakov's first match in over a year, he would suffer a shock upset defeat to teammate and friend, Khetag Tsabolov and lose 9–3; with Tsabolov reaching the final, Sidakov would be pulled into repechage. Sidakov would be faced with Azamat Khadzaragov of the same republic (North Ossetia-Alania), Sidakov was the victor by technical fall, which would allow him to the chance to wrestle for one of the two bronze medals. Opposite Sidakov, was 2016 world champion, Magomed Kurbanaliev, whom was defeated by the score of 9–1 – resulting in a bronze medal for Sidakov.

=== 2021 ===
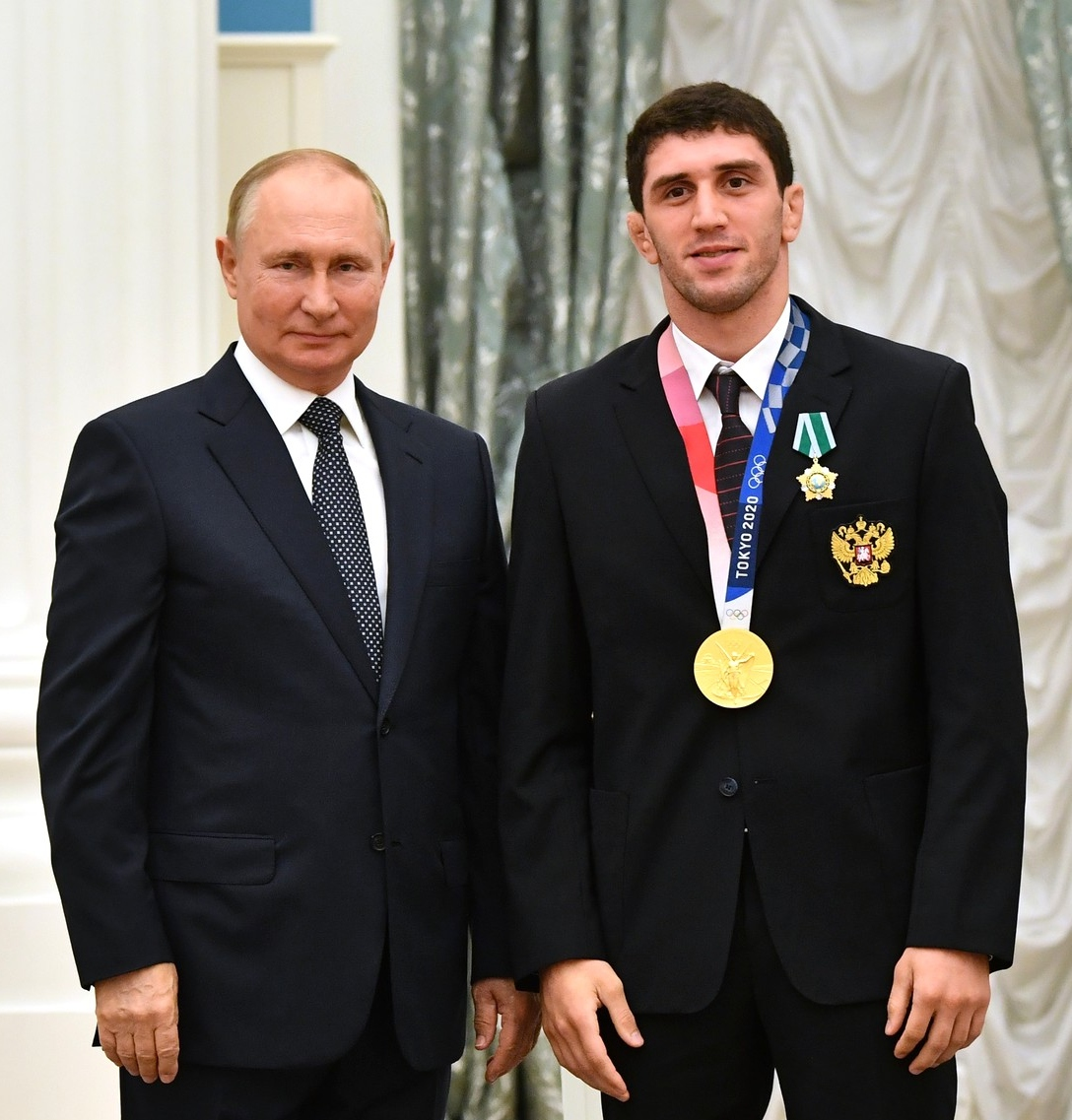
Sidakov with Vladimir Putin in the Kremlin in 2021

==== 2021 Russian National Championships ====
Following Sidakov's unsuccessful 2020 National championships run, he would return at the 2021 national championships held in Ulan-Ude, Buryatia. Sidakov would start his run with a fall win over Khanty-Mansiysk's Tsyrenov, followed by a 4–0 shut-out against Dagestan representative Dzhaparov. In the quarter-final, Sidakov would be matched up with Dagestan's Kurbanaliev, whom Sidakov defeated by the score of 5–3; the semi-final consisted of a match-up with Kabardino-Balkaria's Timur Bizhoev, which was a tightly fought match; ultimately decided by Sidakov's strong defense and ability to keep a lead with a 5–3 win. In the final match, Sidakov faced Dagestan representative Razambek Zhamalov, who trains under the Saitiev brothers, in Khasavyurt. In what would be the closest match of Sidakov's run, two push-outs were scored within the last 15 seconds, giving Sidakov a 2*-2 criteria lead, and a failed challenge from Zhamalov's team gave Sidakov the 3–2 win and his third Russian National title. With the win at the 2021 Russian Nationals, Sidakov would be chosen to represent the Russian Olympic Committee at the Tokyo 2020 Olympics, which would be rescheduled for 2021, because of the ongoing pandemic.

==== 2021 Sassari International Tournament ====
Almost two months prior to the start of the Olympic games, Sidakov and most of the Russian National team would be sent to the Sassari City International to gain some pre-Olympic experience; Sidakov would win the gold medal after winning his three matches by two tech-falls and a pin.

==== 2020 Tokyo Olympics ====
With his gold medal and first place win at the 2021 Russian National Championships, Sidakov successfully qualified for the 2020 Summer Olympics held in Tokyo, with a third place seed. On 5 August, in the round of 8, Sidakov was matched up with former Olympian, Augusto Midana of Guinea-Bissau, who was defeated by a 12–2 tech-fall, resulting in a successful Olympic debut. In the quarter-final, Uzbekistan's two-time Asian Champion, and Asian Games Champion, Bekzod Abdurakhmonov stood in the way; after a fairly competitive, Sidakov would be declared the winner with a 12–6 score; advancing Sidakov to the semi-final, opposite second seeded, Daniyar Kaisanov of Kazakhstan. Sidakov would fairly easily dispatch of Kaisanov by a 11–0 tech-fall, resulting in an advancement into the 74 kg finals opposite former Russian, and now Belarusian representative, Magomedkhabib Kadimagomedov. In the final against Kadimagomedov, Sidakov controlled ties and always had strong wrist control, which rendered Kadimagomedov's strong over-hook offense ineffective and never afforded his opponent to get in a good shooting position; Sidakov would win by 7–0, accumulating one passivity point, a takedown, a cradle attempt and two push-outs to win the gold medal.

=== 2022 ===
To start 2022, Sidakov wrestled at the Ivan Poddubny Wrestling League, defeating Azamat Nurykau and teammates, Chermen Valiev and David Baev in the process to capture gold. In the final match against Baev, Sidakov sustained a knee injury which would render him unable to compete for most of 2022.

Sidakov returned at the Dmitry Korkin Memorial where he defeated Kurban Shiraev in the final, winning the gold medal.

=== 2023 ===
Sidakov started the wrestling season with a gold medal at the Ivan Yarygin Golden Grand Prix after defeating Timur Bizhoev 4-0 in the final.

Sidakov planned to wrestle at the Russian National Championships, held in Kaspiysk, Dagestan, but had to withdraw due to illness. Instead, Sidakov returned at the Commonwealth Cup, held in his home of Vladikavkaz, North Ossetia-Alania. Despite making it to the final, Sidakov suffered a shocking defeat to Timur Bizhoev.

Despite the loss, Sidakov was able to compete for the 74 kg spot on the national team that would be sent to the 2023 World Championships. Sidakov wrestled against 2023 Russian National Champion, Chermen Valiev. In a tightly contested match, Sidakov defeated his teammate by the score 3-2, winning a ticket to the 2023 World Wrestling Championships.

==== 2023 World Championships ====
Due to not being able to compete, Sidakov was unseeded going into the World Championships. To start the championships, Sidakov beat Avtandil Kentchadze in a 8-7 wild match. He then defeated Bekzod Abdurakhmonov 3-0 in the round of 16, then beating Younes Emami 6-0 in the round of 8. In the quarter-final Sidakov took on 2014 World Champion and former teammate, Khetag Tsabolov, defeating the Serbian-transfer by 6-4 in a competitive match. Sidakov then faced former U23 World Champion, Turan Bayramov in the semi-final; however, Sidakov defeated the Azeri wrestler 5-1, thus winning an Olympic quota and setting up a highly anticipated final with Kyle Dake.

In the final, Sidakov wrestled 4x World Champion and Olympic Bronze Medallist, Kyle Dake which resulted in a 17-point exhilarating final. After a passivity point and takedown from Sidakov answered by a push-out and takedown by Dake, Dake was up by criteria going into the last minute. Sidakov shot for a takedown, scoring two on an exposure; Dake responded with his own questionable exposure for two; Sidakov again with an exposure and reversal point, giving him three; Dake then scored his own exposure to end the exchange and Sidakov was up 8-7 after a challenge from Dake's team. Dake then tried a desperate attack with five seconds left, which resulted in Sidakov rolling Dake over his own back, giving Sidakov a further two points and after another challenge, Sidakov won the match by the score 10-7, and in the process, winning a third world title.

== Freestyle record ==
Freestyle matches
Res.	Record	Opponent	Score	Date	Event	Location
Denis Tsargush 74 kg Grand Prix (gold)
Win	114-14	(Dagestan) Magoma Dibirgadzhiev	3-1	1 June 2024	Denis Tsargush 74 kg Grand Prix	(Russia) Kislovodsk, Stavropol Krai
Win	113-14	(Dagestan) Magomedrasul Asluev	4-1	1 June 2024	Denis Tsargush 74 kg Grand Prix	(Russia) Kislovodsk, Stavropol Krai
Win	112-14	(Dagestan) Mustafo Akhmedov	12-1	1 June 2024	Denis Tsargush 74 kg Grand Prix	(Russia) Kislovodsk, Stavropol Krai
Win	111-14	(Dagestan) Aznaur Tavaev	6–0	1 June 2024	Denis Tsargush 74 kg Grand Prix	(Russia) Kislovodsk, Stavropol Krai
2023 World Championships (gold) at 74kg
Win	110-14	(United States) Kyle Dake	10–7	18 September 2023	2023 World Wrestling Championships	Belgrade, Serbia
Win	109-14	(Azerbaijan) Turan Bayramov	5–1	17 September 2023	2023 World Wrestling Championships	Belgrade, Serbia
Win	108-14	(Serbia) Khetag Tsabolov	6–4	17 September 2023	2023 World Wrestling Championships	Belgrade, Serbia
Win	107-14	(Iran) Younes Emami	6–0	17 September 2023	2023 World Wrestling Championships	Belgrade, Serbia
Win	106-14	(Uzbekistan) Bekzod Abdurakhmonov	3–0	17 September 2023	2023 World Wrestling Championships	Belgrade, Serbia
Win	105-14	(Georgia (country)) Avtandil Kentchadze	7–6	17 September 2023	2023 World Wrestling Championships	Belgrade, Serbia
Win	104-14	(North Ossetia–Alania) Chermen Valiev	3-2	19 August 2023	Team Sidakov vs. Team Sadulaev Wrestle-off	Sirius, Russia
Commonwealth Cup (silver) at 74kg
Loss	103-14	(Kabardino-Balkaria) Timur Bizhoev	2-3	28 July 2023	Commonwealth Cup	Vladikavkaz, Russia
Win	103-13	(North Ossetia–Alania) Robert Dzukaev	9-0	27 July 2023	Commonwealth Cup	Vladikavkaz, Russia
Win	102-13	(Sakha Republic) Stanislav Svinoboev	11-0	27 July 2023	Commonwealth Cup	Vladikavkaz, Russia
2023 Ivan Yarygin Golden Grand Prix (gold) at 74kg
Win	101-13	(Kabardino-Balkaria) Timur Bizhoev	4-0	28 January 2023	Ivan Yarygin Grand Prix 2023	Krasnoyarsk, Russia
Win	100-13	(North Ossetia–Alania) Chermen Valiev	6-5	27 January 2023	Ivan Yarygin Grand Prix 2023	Krasnoyarsk, Russia
Win	99-13	(Buryatia) Aleksandr Baltuev	9-0	27 January 2023	Ivan Yarygin Grand Prix 2023	Krasnoyarsk, Russia
Win	98-13	(Moldova) Vasile Diacon	10-0	27 January 2023	Ivan Yarygin Grand Prix 2023	Krasnoyarsk, Russia
Win	97–13	(Iran) Younes Emami	6-4	20 December 2022	Podubbny Wrestling League	Bishkek, Kyrgyzstan
Loss	96–13	(Iran) Ali Savadkouhi	2-2*	18 November 2022	Iranian Premier League	Tehran, Iran
Win	96–12	(Iran) Amirhossein Hausi			Iranian Premier League	Tehran, Iran
(gold) at Dmitry Korkin Memorial Cup 2022
Win	95–12	(Dagestan) Kurban Shiraev	4-0	29 October 2022	Dmitry Korkin Memorial	Yakutsk, Russia
Win	94–12	(Kabardino-Balkaria) Timur Bizhoev	3-1	28 October 2022	Dmitry Korkin Memorial	Yakutsk, Russia
Win	93–12	(Buryatia) Aleksei Borovitsky	10-2	28 October 2022	Dmitry Korkin Memorial	Yakutsk, Russia
Win	92–12	(Sakha Republic) Timur Nikolaev	10-0	28 October 2022	Dmitry Korkin Memorial	Yakutsk, Russia
(gold) at Ivan Podubbny Wrestling League 2022
Win	91–12	(North Ossetia–Alania) David Baev	3-1	20 May 2022	Poddubny Wrestling League	Moscow, Russia
Win	90–12	(North Ossetia–Alania) Chermen Valiev	4-0	19 May 2022	Poddubny Wrestling League	Moscow, Russia
Win	89–12	(Belarus) Azamat Nurykau	7-0	19 May 2022	Poddubny Wrestling League	Moscow, Russia
Win	88–12	(Belarus) Magomedkhabib Kadimagomedov	6–1	3 December 2021	2021 Alrosa Cup	Moscow, Russia
2020 Summer Olympics (gold) at 74 kg
Win	87–12	(Belarus) Magomedkhabib Kadimagomedov	7–0	6 August 2021	2020 Summer Olympics	Tokyo, Japan
Win	86–12	(Kazakhstan) Daniyar Kaisanov	TF 11–0	5 August 2021	2020 Summer Olympics	Tokyo, Japan
Win	85–12	(Uzbekistan) Bekzod Abdurakhmonov	13–6	5 August 2021	2020 Summer Olympics	Tokyo, Japan
Win	84–12	(Guinea-Bissau) Augusto Midana	TF 12–2	5 August 2021	2020 Summer Olympics	Tokyo, Japan
2021 Sassari City (gold) at 74 kg
Win	83–12	(Canada) Jasmit Phulka	TF 10–0	18 June–19, 2021	2021 Sassari City International	Sassari, Italy
Win	82–12	(Malta) Andrew Azzopardi	TF 11–0	18 June–19, 2021	2021 Sassari City International	Sassari, Italy
Win	81–12	(Guinea-Bissau) Augusto Midana	Fall	18 June–19, 2021	2021 Sassari City International	Sassari, Italy
2021 Russian Nationals (gold) at 74 kg
Win	80–12	(Dagestan) Razambek Zhamalov	3–2	11–12 March 2021	2021 Russian National Freestyle Wrestling Championships	Ulan-Ude, Russia
Win	79–12	(Krasnodar) Timur Bizhoev	5–3	11–12 March 2021	2021 Russian National Freestyle Wrestling Championships	Ulan-Ude, Russia
Win	78–12	(Dagestan) Magomed Kurbanaliev	5–3	11–12 March 2021	2021 Russian National Freestyle Wrestling Championships	Ulan-Ude, Russia
Win	77–12	(Dagestan) Darsam Dzhaparov	4–0	11–12 March 2021	2021 Russian National Freestyle Wrestling Championships	Ulan-Ude, Russia
Win	76–12	(Khanty-Mansi Autonomous Okrug) Buyan Tsyrenov	Fall	11–12 March 2021	2021 Russian National Freestyle Wrestling Championships	Ulan-Ude, Russia
2020 Russian Nationals (bronze) at 74kg
Win	75–12	(Dagestan) Magomed Kurbanaliev	9–1	17 October 2020	2020 Russian National Freestyle Wrestling Championships	Naro-Fominsk, Russia
Win	74–12	(North Ossetia–Alania) Azamat Khadzaragov	TF 12–2	17 October 2020	2020 Russian National Freestyle Wrestling Championships	Naro-Fominsk, Russia
Loss	73–12	(North Ossetia–Alania) Khetag Tsabolov	3–9	17 October 2020	2020 Russian National Freestyle Wrestling Championships	Naro-Fominsk, Russia
2019 World Championships (gold) at 74kg
Win	73–11	(Italy) Frank Chamizo	5–2	21 September 2019	2019 World Wrestling Championships	Nur-Sultan, Kazakhstan
Win	72–11	(United States) Jordan Burroughs	4–3	20 September 2019	2019 World Wrestling Championships	Nur-Sultan, Kazakhstan
Win	71–11	(Japan) Mao Okui	6–0	20 September 2019	2019 World Wrestling Championships	Nur-Sultan, Kazakhstan
Win	70–11	(Poland) Kamil Rybicki	8–0	20 September 2019	2019 World Wrestling Championships	Nur-Sultan, Kazakhstan
Win	69–11	(Mexico) Victor Hernández	TF 10–0	20 September 2019	2019 World Wrestling Championships	Nur-Sultan, Kazakhstan
Win	68–11	(Russia) Magomed Kurbanaliev	2–1	16 August 2019	2019 Russian World Team Wrestle-offs	Sochi, Russia
2019 European Games (gold) at 74kg
Win	67–11	(Turkey) Soner Demirtaş	Fall	25 June-26, 2019	2019 European Games	Minsk, Belarus
Win	66–11	(Belarus) Azamat Nurykau	6–4	25 June-26, 2019	2019 European Games	Minsk, Belarus
Win	65–11	(Georgia (country)) Avtandil Kentchadze	5–3	25 June-26, 2019	2019 European Games	Minsk, Belarus
2019 World Cup (gold) at 74kg
Win	64–11	(Iran) Reza Afzali	6–0	16 March-17, 2019	2019 Wrestling World Cup	Yakutsk, Russia
Win	63–11	(Cuba) Geandry Garzón	Fall	16 March-17, 2019	2019 Wrestling World Cup	Yakutsk, Russia
2019 Ivan Yarygin Golden Grand Prix (gold) at 74kg
Win	62–11	(Turkey) Yakup Gör	5–4	24 January-27, 2019	Golden Grand Prix Ivan Yarygin 2019	Krasnoyarsk, Russia
Win	61–11	(Belarus) Azamat Nurykau	7–1	24 January-27, 2019	Golden Grand Prix Ivan Yarygin 2019	Krasnoyarsk, Russia
Win	60–11	(Krasnodar) Timur Bizhoev	2–2	24 January-27, 2019	Golden Grand Prix Ivan Yarygin 2019	Krasnoyarsk, Russia
Win	59–11	(Japan) Ken Hosaka	TF 12–1	24 January-27, 2019	Golden Grand Prix Ivan Yarygin 2019	Krasnoyarsk, Russia
2018 World Championships (gold) at 74kg
Win	58–11	(Georgia (country)) Avtandil Kentchadze	2–2	20 October-21, 2018	2018 World Wrestling Championships	Budapest, Hungary
Win	57–11	(Italy) Frank Chamizo	3–2	20 October-21, 2018	2018 World Wrestling Championships	Budapest, Hungary
Win	56–11	(United States) Jordan Burroughs	6–5	20 October-21, 2018	2018 World Wrestling Championships	Budapest, Hungary
Win	55–11	(Puerto Rico) Franklin Gómez	6–0	20 October-21, 2018	2018 World Wrestling Championships	Budapest, Hungary
Win	54–11	(Bulgaria) Miroslav Kirov	TF 10–0	20 October-21, 2018	2018 World Wrestling Championships	Budapest, Hungary
2018 Russian Nationals (gold) at 74kg
Win	53–11	(North Ossetia–Alania) Khetag Tsabolov	2–2	3 August-5, 2018	2018 Russian National Freestyle Wrestling Championships	Odintsovo, Russia
Win	52–11	(Tatarstan) Evgeny Lapshov	TF 10–0	3 August-5, 2018	2018 Russian National Freestyle Wrestling Championships	Odintsovo, Russia
Win	51–11	(Krasnodar) Timur Bizhoev	3–1	3 August-5, 2018	2018 Russian National Freestyle Wrestling Championships	Odintsovo, Russia
2018 U23 European Championships (gold) at 74kg
Win	50–11	(Slovakia) Achsarbek Gulajev	3–1	4 June-10, 2018	2018 European U23 Wrestling Championship	Istanbul, Turkey
Win	49–11	(Georgia (country)) Avtandil Kentchadze	TF 12–1	4 June-10, 2018	2018 European U23 Wrestling Championship	Istanbul, Turkey
Win	48–11	(Germany) Johann Steinforth	7–0	4 June-10, 2018	2018 European U23 Wrestling Championship	Istanbul, Turkey
Win	47–11	(Bulgaria) Dzhemal Rushen Ali	TF 11–0	4 June-10, 2018	2018 European U23 Wrestling Championship	Istanbul, Turkey
2018 World Military Championships (gold) at 74kg
Win	46–11	(Iran) Hamed Rashidi	11–3	14 May-20, 2018	2018 World Military Championships	Moscow, Russia
Win	45–11	(Kazakhstan) Baibolsyn Kurmanbekov	TF 11–0	14 May-20, 2018	2018 World Military Championships	Moscow, Russia
Win	44–11	(Germany) Johann Steinforth	TF 11–0	14 May-20, 2018	2018 World Military Championships	Moscow, Russia
2018 Ivan Yarygin Golden Grand Prix (silver) at 74kg
Loss	43–11	(Russia) Khetag Tsabolov	1–3	28 January 2018	Golden Grand Prix Ivan Yarygin 2018	Krasnoyarsk, Russia
Win	43–10	(Russia) Kakhaber Khubezhty	5–0	28 January 2018	Golden Grand Prix Ivan Yarygin 2018	Krasnoyarsk, Russia
Win	42–10	(Turkey) Muhammet Akdeniz	TF 13–2	28 January 2018	Golden Grand Prix Ivan Yarygin 2018	Krasnoyarsk, Russia
2017 Alans (silver) at 70kg
Loss	41–10	(Russia) Magomed Kurbanaliev	5–7	17 November-19, 2017	2017 Alany Cup	Vladikavkaz, Russia
Win	41–9	(Italy) Frank Chamizo	9–6	17 November-19, 2017	2017 Alany Cup	Vladikavkaz, Russia
Win	40–9	(Georgia (country)) Shmagi Todua	TF 10–0	17 November-19, 2017	2017 Alany Cup	Vladikavkaz, Russia
Win	39–9	(Bulgaria) Miroslav Kirov	TF 10–0	17 November-19, 2017	2017 Alany Cup	Vladikavkaz, Russia
2017 Alrosa Cup (gold) at 70kg
Win	38–9	(Azerbaijan) Murtazali Muslimov	Points	9 November-13, 2017	2017 Alrosa Cup	Moscow, Russia
Win	37–9	(Moldova) Dmitri Malencov	TF	9 November-13, 2017	2017 Alrosa Cup	Moscow, Russia
Win	36–9	(Georgia (country)) Levan Kelekhsashvili	Points	9 November-13, 2017	2017 Alrosa Cup	Moscow, Russia
2017 Yugra Cup (silver) at 70kg
Loss	35–9	(Russia) Israil Kasumov	4–5	28 October-29, 2017	2017 Prix of Vladimir Semenov "Yugra Cup"	Nefteyugansk, Russia
Win	35–8	(Russia) Anzor Zakuev	11–6	28 October-29, 2017	2017 Prix of Vladimir Semenov "Yugra Cup"	Nefteyugansk, Russia
Win	34–8	(Russia) Ramazan Archikhanov	10–4	28 October-29, 2017	2017 Prix of Vladimir Semenov "Yugra Cup"	Nefteyugansk, Russia
2017 Stepan Sargsyan Cup (gold) at 70kg
Win	33–8	(Georgia (country)) Konstantine Khabalashvili	TF 10–0	7 October-8, 2017	2017 Stepan Sargsyan Cup	Vanadzor, Armenia
Win	32–8	(Georgia (country)) Omari Gurjidze	TF 10–0	7 October-8, 2017	2017 Stepan Sargsyan Cup	Vanadzor, Armenia
Win	31–8	(Georgia (country)) Giorgi Sanodze	Fall	7 October-8, 2017	2017 Stepan Sargsyan Cup	Vanadzor, Armenia
Win	30–8	(Russia) Arsen Tomaev	TF 11–0	7 October-8, 2017	2017 Stepan Sargsyan Cup	Vanadzor, Armenia
2017 U23 European Championships (silver) at 70kg
Loss	29–8	(Azerbaijan) Gadjimurad Omarov	1–1	28 March – 2 April 2017	2017 U23 European Championships	Szombathely, Hungary
Win	29–7	(Turkey) Muhammet Akdeniz	TF 13–3	28 March – 2 April 2017	2017 U23 European Championships	Szombathely, Hungary
Win	28–7	(Ukraine) Vasyl Mykhailov	11–2	28 March – 2 April 2017	2017 U23 European Championships	Szombathely, Hungary
Win	27–7	(Latvia) Alberts Jurcenko	TF 11–0	28 March – 2 April 2017	2017 U23 European Championships	Szombathely, Hungary
2017 Ivan Yarygin Golden Grand Prix (silver) at 70kg
Loss	26–7	(Russia) Israil Kasumov	2–5	27 January-29, 2017	Golden Grand Prix Ivan Yarygin 2017	Krasnoyarsk, Russia
Win	26–6	(Belarus) Magomedkhabib Kadimagomedov	9–7	27 January-29, 2017	Golden Grand Prix Ivan Yarygin 2017	Krasnoyarsk, Russia
Win	25–6	(Russia) Timur Bizhoev	3–1	27 January-29, 2017	Golden Grand Prix Ivan Yarygin 2017	Krasnoyarsk, Russia
Win	24–6	(Russia) Timur Nikolaev	3–0	27 January-29, 2017	Golden Grand Prix Ivan Yarygin 2017	Krasnoyarsk, Russia
Win	23–6	(Russia) Rasul Dzhukayev	5–0	27 January-29, 2017	Golden Grand Prix Ivan Yarygin 2017	Krasnoyarsk, Russia
2016 Russian Nationals (gold) at 70kg
Win	22–6	(North Ossetia–Alania) Radik Valiev	4–2	27 May 2016	2016 Russian National Freestyle Wrestling Championships	Yakutsk, Russia
Win	21–6	(Tatarstan) Ildus Giniatullin	TF 12–0	27 May 2016	2016 Russian National Freestyle Wrestling Championships	Yakutsk, Russia
Win	20–6	(Buryatia) Yevgeny Zherbaev	12–3	27 May 2016	2016 Russian National Freestyle Wrestling Championships	Yakutsk, Russia
Win	19–6	(Dagestan) Khabib Magomedov	7–2	27 May 2016	2016 Russian National Freestyle Wrestling Championships	Yakutsk, Russia
2016 European Championships 5th at 70kg
Loss	18–6	(Belarus) Azamat Nurykau	7–9	11 March 2016	2016 European Wrestling Championships	Riga, Latvia
Win	18–5	(Armenia) David Safaryan	9–4	11 March 2016	2016 European Wrestling Championships	Riga, Latvia
Win	17–5	(Turkey) Muhammed Ilkhan	4–2	11 March 2016	2016 European Wrestling Championships	Riga, Latvia
Loss	16–5	(Poland) Magomedmurad Gadzhiev	4–4	11 March 2016	2016 European Wrestling Championships	Riga, Latvia
2016 Ivan Yarygin Golden Grand Prix (gold) at 70kg
Win	16–4	(Russia) Khusey Suyunchev	2–2	27 January-29, 2016	Golden Grand Prix Ivan Yarygin 2016	Krasnoyarsk, Russia
Win	15–4	(Russia) Atsamaz Sanakoev	1–1	27 January-29, 2016	Golden Grand Prix Ivan Yarygin 2016	Krasnoyarsk, Russia
Win	14–4	(Russia) Kamal Malikov	6–4	27 January-29, 2016	Golden Grand Prix Ivan Yarygin 2016	Krasnoyarsk, Russia
Win	13–4	(Russia) Alibek Akbaev	9–2	27 January-29, 2016	Golden Grand Prix Ivan Yarygin 2016	Krasnoyarsk, Russia
Win	12–4	(Mongolia) Buyanjavyn Batzorig	10–1	27 January-29, 2016	Golden Grand Prix Ivan Yarygin 2016	Krasnoyarsk, Russia
2015 Olympia (gold) at 70kg
Win	11–4	(Greece) Andreas Triantafyllidis	8–0	16 May-17, 2015	2015 Olympia	Olympia, Greece
Win	10–4	(Mexico) V. Longs	TF 11–0	16 May-17, 2015	2015 Olympia	Olympia, Greece
Win	9–4	(Moldova) Mihai Sava	10–4	16 May-17, 2015	2015 Olympia	Olympia, Greece
Win	8–4	(Albania) Vilson Ndregjoni	TF 10–0	16 May-17, 2015	2015 Olympia	Olympia, Greece
2015 World Cup at 65kg
Loss	7–4	(Azerbaijan) Magomed Muslimov	0–6	11 April-12, 2015	2015 World Wrestling Cup	(United States) Los Angeles, California
Loss	7–3	(Cuba) Franklin Maren	3–4	11 April-12, 2015	2015 World Wrestling Cup	(United States) Los Angeles, California
Loss	7–2	(Mongolia) Ganzorigiin Mandakhnaran	4–6	11 April-12, 2015	2015 World Wrestling Cup	(United States) Los Angeles, California
2015 Ivan Yarygin Golden Grand Prix (bronze) at 65kg
Win	7–1	(Russia) Alibeggadzhi Emeev	3–2	22 January-26, 2015	Golden Grand Prix Ivan Yarygin 2015	Krasnoyarsk, Russia
Win	6–1	(Russia) Viktor Stepanov	11–8	22 January-26, 2015	Golden Grand Prix Ivan Yarygin 2015	Krasnoyarsk, Russia
Loss	5–1	(United States) Brent Metcalf	1–9	22 January-26, 2015	Golden Grand Prix Ivan Yarygin 2015	Krasnoyarsk, Russia
Win	5–0	(Kazakhstan) Meirzhan Ashirov	7–6	22 January-26, 2015	Golden Grand Prix Ivan Yarygin 2015	Krasnoyarsk, Russia
Win	4–0	(Turkey) Khalil Kupeli	TF 11–0	22 January-26, 2015	Golden Grand Prix Ivan Yarygin 2015	Krasnoyarsk, Russia
2014 Brazil Cup (gold) at 65kg
Win	3–0	(Russia) Shiksaid Dzhalilov	2–1	28 November-30, 2014	2014 Brazil Cup	Rio de Janeiro, Brazil
Win	2–0	(Japan) Kotaro Tanaka	10–2	28 November-30, 2014	2014 Brazil Cup	Rio de Janeiro, Brazil
Win	1–0	(Peru) Sixto Pedragas	TF 10–0	28 November-30, 2014	2014 Brazil Cup	Rio de Janeiro, Brazil
