= Russian National Freestyle 2017 – Men's freestyle 74 kg =

The men's freestyle 74 kg is a competition featured at the 2017 Russian National Freestyle Wrestling Championships, and was held in Nazran, Ingushetia, Russia on June 14.

== Medalists ==
Gold	(North Ossetia–Alania) Khetag Tsabolov
Silver	(Dagestan) Gadzhi Nabiev
Bronze	(North Ossetia–Alania) Alan Zaseev
Bronze	(Krasnoyarsk Krai) Nikita Suchkov

== Results ==
Legend

- F — Won by fall
- WO — Won by walkover (bye)

=== Finals ===
Final
(Dagestan) Gadzhi Nabiev	2
(North Ossetia–Alania) Khetag Tsabolov	7

=== Top half ===
==== Section 1 ====
Round of 32
(Krasnoyarsk Krai) Dmitriy Zyinidinov	10
(Krasnoyarsk Krai) Azret Ulimbashev	0
(Dagestan) Iakub Shikhdzamalov	3
(Bryansk Oblast) Gadzhimurad Alimkhaev	1
(Moscow Oblast) Askhab Geriev	3
(Dagestan) Gadzhi Nabiev	3
(Stavropol Krai) Murtazali Yusupov	3
(North Ossetia–Alania) Slavik Naniev	6
(Ingushetia) Dzhameleil Baymurzaev	2
(North Ossetia–Alania) Radik Valiev	13
(Tatarstan) Evgeny Lapshov	8
(North Ossetia–Alania) Alan Zaseev	14
(Leningrad Oblast) Tadzhi Daudov	2
(Krasnoyarsk Krai) Marik Shebzukhov	1

Round of 16
(North Ossetia–Alania) Khakhaber Khubezhti	11^{F}
(Krasnoyarsk Krai) Dmitriy Zyinidinov	0
(Dagestan) Iakub Shikhdzamalov	3
(Dagestan) Gadzhi Nabiev	5
(North Ossetia–Alania) Slavik Naniev	0
(North Ossetia–Alania) Radik Valiev	10
(North Ossetia–Alania) Alan Zaseev	10
(Leningrad Oblast) Tadzhi Daudov	0

Quarterfinals
(North Ossetia–Alania) Khakhaber Khubezhti	8
(Dagestan) Gadzhi Nabiev	10
(North Ossetia–Alania) Radik Valiev	5
(North Ossetia–Alania) Alan Zaseev	5

Semifinals
(Dagestan) Gadzhi Nabiev	2
(North Ossetia–Alania) Alan Zaseev	2

==== Section 2 ====
Round of 32
(North Ossetia–Alania) Stanislav Khachirov	1
(North Ossetia–Alania) Atsamaz Sanakoev	3
(Dagestan) Khalil Aminov	2
(Krasnoyarsk Krai) Nikita Suchkov	4
(North Ossetia–Alania) Murat Gokonaev	10
(Yakutia) Duylis Sivtsev	0
(Karachay-Cherkessia) Khusey Suyunchev	2
(Dagestan) Adam Khasiev	3^{F}
(Krasnodar Krai) Timur Bizhoev	0
(North Ossetia–Alania) Khetag Tsabolov	10
(Volgograd Oblast) Isa Daudov	0
(Chechnya) Musa Baziev	6^{F}
(Dagestan) Khabib Magomedov	3
(Moscow Oblast) Magomed Mutalibov	6
(Ingushetia) Movsar Bokov	0
(Moscow Oblast) Rasul Shapiev	10

Round of 16
(North Ossetia–Alania) Atsamaz Sanakoev	3
(Krasnoyarsk Krai) Nikita Suchkov	3
(North Ossetia–Alania) Murat Gokonaev	4
(Dagestan) Adam Khasiev	16
(North Ossetia–Alania) Khetag Tsabolov	10
(Chechnya) Musa Baziev	0
(Moscow Oblast) Magomed Mutalibov	0
(Moscow Oblast) Rasul Shapiev	10

Quarterfinals
(Krasnoyarsk Krai) Nikita Suchkov	11
(Dagestan) Adam Khasiev	3
(North Ossetia–Alania) Khetag Tsabolov	14
(Moscow Oblast) Rasul Shapiev	6

Semifinals
(Krasnoyarsk Krai) Nikita Suchkov	4
(North Ossetia–Alania) Khetag Tsabolov	14

=== Repechage ===
Repechage round 1
(Moscow Oblast) Askhab Geriev	2
(Dagestan) Iakub Shikhdzamalov	6
(Krasnodar Krai) Timur Bizhoev	2
(Chechnya) Musa Baziev	7

Repechage round 2
(Dagestan) Iakub Shikhdzamalov	4
(North Ossetia–Alania) Khakhaber Khubezhti	10^{F}
(Chechnya) Musa Baziev	2
(Moscow Oblast) Rasul Shapiev	2

Bronze medals
(North Ossetia–Alania) Alan Zaseev	11
(North Ossetia–Alania) Khakhaber Khubezhti	6
(Chechnya) Musa Baziev	10
(Krasnoyarsk Krai) Nikita Suchkov	15
