= Russian National Freestyle 2016 – Men's freestyle 70 kg =

The men's freestyle 70 kg is a competition featured at the 2016 Russian National Freestyle Wrestling Championships, and was held in Yakutsk, Russia on May 27.

== Medalists ==
Gold	(North Ossetia–Alania) Zaurbek Sidakov
Silver	(North Ossetia–Alania) Radik Valiev
Bronze	(Tatarstan) Ildus Giniatullin
Bronze	(Karachay-Cherkessia) Alibek Akbaev

== Results ==
Legend

- F — Won by fall
- WO — Won by walkover

=== Finals ===
Final
(North Ossetia–Alania) Radik Valiev	2
(North Ossetia–Alania) Zaurbek Sidakov	4

=== Top half ===
Round of 32
(Komi Republic) Yusup Mutaliev	0
(North Ossetia–Alania) Radik Valiev	11
(Dagestan) Arslan Arslanov	4
(Karachay-Cherkessia) Alibek Akbaev	4
(Astrakhan Oblast) Shamil Dzhakhparov	2
(Moscow Oblast) Khastemir Tiashinov	6
(Voronezh Oblast) Nasrullah Saygitov	0
(Moscow Oblast) David Suynuchhanov	10
(Leningrad Oblast) Magomedsharip Sharipov	0
(Yakutia) Timur Nikolaev	4
(Stavropol Krai) Ramazan Archikhanov	10
(Republic of Crimea (Russia)) Amin Tekushev	7

Round of 16
(Kabardino-Balkaria) Mulid Lampazhev	4
(Moscow Oblast) Ruslan Rubaev	1
(North Ossetia–Alania) Radik Valiev	5
(Karachay-Cherkessia) Alibek Akbaev	1
(Moscow Oblast) Khastemir Tliashinov	2
(Moscow Oblast) David Suynuchhanov	2
(Yakutia) Timur Nikolaev	1
(Stavropol Krai) Ramazan Archikhanov	5

Quarterfinals
(Kabardino-Balkaria) Mulid Lampazhev	0
(North Ossetia–Alania) Radik Valiev	6
(Moscow Oblast) Khastemir Tliashinov	4
(Stavropol Krai) Ramazan Archikhanov	5

Semifinals
(North Ossetia–Alania) Radik Valiev	WO
(Stavropol Krai) Ramazan Archikhanov

=== Bottom half ===
Round of 32
(Buryatia) Ivan Garmaev	0
(Dagestan) Khalil Aminov	10
(Yakutia) German Ustinov	2
(Yakutia) Ivan Efremov	1
(North Ossetia–Alania) Zaurbek Sidakov	7
(Dagestan) Khabib Magomedov	2
(Moscow Oblast) Geogrgi Dzhinkaev	0
(Buryatia) Yevgeny Zherbaev	10
(Kemerovo Oblast) Artur Khutsistov	2
(Tatarstan) Ildus Giniatullin	4
(Krasnoyarsk Krai) Arbak Sat	10
(Leningrad Oblast) Danil Egorov	0
(Dagestan) Magomedkhabib Kadimagomedov	6
(Krasnoyarsk Krai) Nadirbek Khizriev	6
(North Ossetia–Alania) Azamat Khadzaragov	1
(Buryatia) Bair Bazarov	3

Round of 16
(Dagestan) Khalil Aminov	6
(Yakutia) German Ustinov	5
(North Ossetia–Alania) Zaurbek Sidakov	12
(Buryatia) Yevgeny Zherbaev	3
(Tatarstan) Ildus Giniatullin	14
(Krasnoyarsk Krai) Arbak Sat	13
(Dagestan) Magomedkhabib Kadimagomedov	5
(Buryatia) Bair Bazarov	3

Quarterfinals
(Dagestan) Khalil Aminov
(North Ossetia–Alania) Zaurbek Sidakov	WO
(Tatarstan) Ildus Giniatullin	WO
(Dagestan) Magomedkhabib Kadimagomedov

Semifinals
(North Ossetia–Alania) Zaurbek Sidakov	12
(Tatarstan) Ildus Giniatullin	0

=== Repechage ===
Repechage round 2
(Komi Republic) Yusup Mutaliev	0
(Karachay-Cherkessia) Alibek Akbaev	9
(Dagestan) Khalil Aminov
(Buryatia) Yevgeny Zherbaev	WO

Bronze medals
(Kabardino-Balkaria) Mulid Lampazhev	3
(Karachay-Cherkessia) Alibek Akbaev	4
(Buryatia) Yevgeny Zherbaev	6
(Tatarstan) Ildus Giniatullin	6
