= Golden Grand Prix Ivan Yarygin 2017 – Men's freestyle 74 kg =

The men's freestyle 74 kg is a competition featured at the Golden Grand Prix Ivan Yarygin 2017, and was held in Krasnoyarsk, Russia on January 27.

== Medalists ==
Gold	(Dagestan) Akhmed Gadzhimagomedov
Silver	(North Ossetia–Alania) Atsamaz Sanakoev
Bronze	(North Ossetia–Alania) Radik Valiev
Bronze	(North Ossetia–Alania) Khakhaber Khubezhti

== Results ==
Legend

- F — Won by fall
- D — Won by disqualification
- R — Won by retire

=== Final ===
Final
(North Ossetia–Alania) Atsamaz Sanakoev	0^{R}
(Dagestan) Akhmed Gadzhimagomedov	5

=== Top half ===
Round of 32
(Japan) Sohsuke Takatani	13
(North Ossetia–Alania) Alan Zaseev	10
(China) Mengkheijigan	1
(Kabardino-Balkaria) Azret Ulimbashev	12

Round of 16
(Mongolia) Bat-Erdene Byambadorj	2
(Tuva) Ertine Mortuy-ool	6^{F}
(Dagestan) Khabib Batirov	3
(Kazakhstan) Almaz Amalbek	0
(North Ossetia–Alania) Radik Valiev	1
(North Ossetia–Alania) Atsamaz Sanakoev	4
(Japan) Sohsuke Takatani	7
(Kabardino-Balkaria) Azret Ulimbashev	4

Quarterfinals
(Tuva) Ertine Mortuy-ool	0
(Dagestan) Khabib Batirov	10
(North Ossetia–Alania) Atsamaz Sanakoev	8
(Japan) Sohsuke Takatani	6

Semifinals
(Dagestan) Khabib Batirov	4
(North Ossetia–Alania) Atsamaz Sanakoev	4

=== Bottom half ===
Round of 32
(Kabardino-Balkaria) Artem Umarov	11
(Moscow Oblast) Khastemir Tliashinov	0
(Japan) Mao Okui	2
(Dagestan) Gadzhi Nabiev	8
(China) Aorigileng	0
(North Ossetia–Alania) Khakhaber Khubezhti	10
(Kazakhstan) Bolat Sakaev	9
(Moscow Oblast) Tazhitin Akaev	5
(North Ossetia–Alania) Zaur Makiev	2
(North Ossetia–Alania) Khetag Tsabolov	3
(Krasnoyarsk Krai) Nikita Suchkov	12
(Kazakhstan) Aidar Baldanbayev	6
(Buryatia) Arsalan Budazhapov	3
(Tatarstan) Evgeniy Lapshov	0
(Dagestan) Akhmed Gadzhimagomedov	6
(Chechnya) Baziyev Musa	2

Round of 16
(Kabardino-Balkaria) Artem Umarov	1
(Dagestan) Gadzhi Nabiev	4
(North Ossetia–Alania) Khakhaber Khubezhti	8
(Kazakhstan) Bolat Sakaev	5
(North Ossetia–Alania) Khetag Tsabolov	12
(Krasnoyarsk Krai) Nikita Suchkov	2
(Buryatia) Arsalan Budazhapov	4
(Dagestan) Akhmed Gadzhimagomedov	7

Quarterfinals
(Dagestan) Gadzhi Nabiev	6
(North Ossetia–Alania) Khakhaber Khubezhti	6
(North Ossetia–Alania) Khetag Tsabolov	0
(Dagestan) Akhmed Gadzhimagomedov	8

Semifinals
(North Ossetia–Alania) Khakhaber Khubezhti	3
(Dagestan) Akhmed Gadzhimagomedov	3

=== Repechage ===
Repechage round 1
-
-
(Chechnya) Musa Baziev	13
(Buryatia) Arsalan Budazhapov	0

Repechage round 2
(North Ossetia–Alania) Radik Valiev	6
(Japan) Sohsuke Takatani	1
(North Ossetia–Alania) Khetag Tsabolov	10
(Chechnya) Musa Baziev	0

Bronze medals
(North Ossetia–Alania) Radik Valiev	4
(Dagestan) Khabib Batirov	0^{D}
(North Ossetia–Alania) Khetag Tsabolov	2
(North Ossetia–Alania) Khakhaber Khubezhti	4^{F}
