= 2014 World Wrestling Championships – Men's freestyle 70 kg =

Men's freestyle 70 kg at the 2014 World Championships
- Venue: Gymnastics Sport Palace
- Dates: 8 September 2014
- Competitors: 29 from 29 nations

Medalists
gold medal	Khetag Tsabolov	Russia
silver medal	Yakup Gör	Turkey
bronze medal	Bekzod Abdurakhmonov	Uzbekistan
bronze medal	Ali Shabanau	Belarus

The men's freestyle 70 kilograms is a competition featured at the 2014 World Wrestling Championships, and was held in Tashkent, Uzbekistan on 8 September 2014.

This freestyle wrestling competition consisted of a single-elimination tournament, with a repechage used to determine the winners of two bronze medals.

== Results ==
Legend

- F — Won by fall

=== Final ===
Final
Yakup Gör (TUR)	0
Khetag Tsabolov (RUS)	10

=== Top half ===
Round of 32
Evgheni Nedealco (MDA)	11
Eduardo Valencia (MEX)	0
Zsombor Gulyás (HUN)	0
Bekzod Abdurakhmonov (UZB)	11
Miroslav Kirov (BUL)	1
Mostafa Hosseinkhani (IRI)	2
Ken Hosaka (JPN)	3
Mark Popov (ISR)	1
Ayad Ibrahim (EGY)	0
Yakup Gör (TUR)	11

Round of 16
Zalimkhan Yusupov (TJK)	11
Batchuluuny Ankhbayar (MGL)	0
Ruslan Dibirgadjiyev (AZE)	6
Evgheni Nedealco (MDA)	4
Bekzod Abdurakhmonov (UZB)	3
Mostafa Hosseinkhani (IRI)	3
Ken Hosaka (JPN)	0
Yakup Gör (TUR)	11

Quarterfinals
Zalimkhan Yusupov (TJK)	3
Ruslan Dibirgadjiyev (AZE)	0
Bekzod Abdurakhmonov (UZB)	1
Yakup Gör (TUR)	4

Semifinals
Zalimkhan Yusupov (TJK)	0
Yakup Gör (TUR)	7

=== Bottom half ===
Round of 32
Cleopas Ncube (CAN)	11
Arun Kumar (IND)	0
Kim Dai-sung (KOR)	15
Adrian Moise (ROU)	5
Andreas Triantafyllidis (GRE)	0
Khetag Tsabolov (RUS)	10^{F}
Yoan Blanco (ECU)	5
Aleksandre Jatchvadze (GEO)	4
Rostyslav Pervachuk (UKR)	1
Ali Shabanau (BLR)	11
Pedro Soto (PUR)	4
Elaman Dogdurbek Uulu (KGZ)	2
Gui Yunfei (CHN)	1
Grigor Grigoryan (ARM)	9
Nick Marable (USA)	2
Akzhurek Tanatarov (KAZ)	1

Round of 16
Cleopas Ncube (CAN)	4
Kim Dai-sung (KOR)	2
Khetag Tsabolov (RUS)	9
Yoan Blanco (ECU)	4
Ali Shabanau (BLR)	12
Pedro Soto (PUR)	0
Grigor Grigoryan (ARM)	2
Nick Marable (USA)	4

Quarterfinals
Cleopas Ncube (CAN)	6
Khetag Tsabolov (RUS)	8
Ali Shabanau (BLR)	5
Nick Marable (USA)	2

Semifinals
Khetag Tsabolov (RUS)	11
Ali Shabanau (BLR)	0

=== Repechage ===
Repechage round 1
Ayad Ibrahim (EGY)	8
Ken Hosaka (JPN)	4
Andreas Triantafyllidis (GRE)	2
Yoan Blanco (ECU)	5

Repechage round 2
Ayad Ibrahim (EGY)	0
Bekzod Abdurakhmonov (UZB)	10
Yoan Blanco (ECU)	0
Cleopas Ncube (CAN)	8

Bronze medals
Bekzod Abdurakhmonov (UZB)	7
Zalimkhan Yusupov (TJK)	3
Cleopas Ncube (CAN)	1
Ali Shabanau (BLR)	13
