= 2021 World Wrestling Championships – Men's freestyle 74 kg =

Wrestling competitions

Men's freestyle 74 kg at the 2021 World Championships
- Venue: Nye Jordal Amfi
- Dates: 2–3 October 2021
- Competitors: 29 from 29 nations

Medalists
gold medal	Kyle Dake	United States
silver medal	Tajmuraz Salkazanov	Slovakia
bronze medal	Fazlı Eryılmaz	Turkey
bronze medal	Timur Bizhoev	RWF

The men's freestyle 74 kilograms is a competition featured at the 2021 World Wrestling Championships, and was held in Oslo, Norway on 2 and 3 October.

This freestyle wrestling competition consists of a single-elimination tournament, with a repechage used to determine the winner of two bronze medals. The two finalists face off for gold and silver medals. Each wrestler who loses to one of the two finalists moves into the repechage, culminating in a pair of bronze medal matches featuring the semifinal losers each facing the remaining repechage opponent from their half of the bracket.

Kyle Dake from the United States won the gold medal.

== Results ==
=== Final ===
Final
Kyle Dake (USA)	7
Tajmuraz Salkazanov (SVK)	3

=== Top half ===
Round of 32
Aimar Andruse (EST)	0
Vasile Diacon (MDA)	4
Fazlı Eryılmaz (TUR)	10
Lakmal Wijesooriya (SRI)	0
Murad Kuramagomedov (HUN)	0
Zielimkhan Tohuzov (UKR)	10
Khetag Tsabolov (SRB)	10
Kamil Rybicki (POL)	0
Néstor Tafur (COL)	10
Jasmit Phulka (CAN)	0
Joshgun Azimov (AZE)	10
Mathayo Mahabila (KEN)	0
Azamat Nurykau (BLR)	7
Mitch Finesilver (ISR)	3

Round of 16
Kyle Dake (USA)	11
Vasile Diacon (MDA)	0
Fazlı Eryılmaz (TUR)	7
Zielimkhan Tohuzov (UKR)	1
Khetag Tsabolov (SRB)	12
Néstor Tafur (COL)	1
Joshgun Azimov (AZE)	2
Azamat Nurykau (BLR)	2

Quarterfinals
Kyle Dake (USA)	5
Fazlı Eryılmaz (TUR)	0
Khetag Tsabolov (SRB)	7
Azamat Nurykau (BLR)	7

Semifinals
Kyle Dake (USA)	9
Azamat Nurykau (BLR)	1

=== Bottom half ===
Round of 32
Ali-Pasha Umarpashaev (BUL)	11
Suresh Chunara (NEP)	0
Yash Tushir (IND)	0
Timur Bizhoev (RWF)	7
Victor Hernández (MEX)	6
Malik Amine (SMR)	7
Kubilay Cakici (GER)	0
Avtandil Kentchadze (GEO)	11
Masaki Sato (JPN)	2
Gong Byung-min (KOR)	2
Younes Emami (IRI)	12
Enkhbayaryn Byambadorj (MGL)	2

Round of 16
Tajmuraz Salkazanov (SVK)	3
Ali-Pasha Umarpashaev (BUL)	0
Timur Bizhoev (RWF)	10
Malik Amine (SMR)	0
Avtandil Kentchadze (GEO)	13
Masaki Sato (JPN)	2
Younes Emami (IRI)	12
Nurkozha Kaipanov (KAZ)	0

Quarterfinals
Tajmuraz Salkazanov (SVK)	2
Timur Bizhoev (RWF)	2
Avtandil Kentchadze (GEO)	10
Younes Emami (IRI)	1

Semifinals
Tajmuraz Salkazanov (SVK)	5
Avtandil Kentchadze (GEO)	0

=== Repechage ===
Repechage round 2
Vasile Diacon (MDA)	0
Fazlı Eryılmaz (TUR)	3
Ali-Pasha Umarpashaev (BUL)	2
Timur Bizhoev (RWF)	5

Bronze medals
Fazlı Eryılmaz (TUR)	2
Azamat Nurykau (BLR)	1
Timur Bizhoev (RWF)	8
Avtandil Kentchadze (GEO)	6

== Final standing ==
Rank	Athlete
1st place, gold medalist(s)	Kyle Dake (USA)
2nd place, silver medalist(s)	Tajmuraz Salkazanov (SVK)
3rd place, bronze medalist(s)	Fazlı Eryılmaz (TUR)
3rd place, bronze medalist(s)	Timur Bizhoev (RWF)
5	Azamat Nurykau (BLR)
5	Avtandil Kentchadze (GEO)
7	Khetag Tsabolov (SRB)
8	Younes Emami (IRI)
9	Ali-Pasha Umarpashaev (BUL)
10	Joshgun Azimov (AZE)
11	Zielimkhan Tohuzov (UKR)
12	Néstor Tafur (COL)
13	Masaki Sato (JPN)
14	Malik Amine (SMR)
15	Vasile Diacon (MDA)
16	Victor Hernández (MEX)
17	Mitch Finesilver (ISR)
18	Gong Byung-min (KOR)
19	Enkhbayaryn Byambadorj (MGL)
20	Aimar Andruse (EST)
21	Yash Tushir (IND)
22	Lakmal Wijesooriya (SRI)
23	Murad Kuramagomedov (HUN)
24	Kamil Rybicki (POL)
25	Jasmit Phulka (CAN)
26	Mathayo Mahabila (KEN)
27	Suresh Chunara (NEP)
28	Kubilay Cakici (GER)
29	Nurkozha Kaipanov (KAZ)
