= 2018 World Wrestling Championships – Men's freestyle 74 kg =

Men's freestyle 74 kg at the 2018 World Championships
- Venue: László Papp Budapest Sports Arena
- Dates: 20–21 October 2018
- Competitors: 32 from 32 nations

Medalists
| gold medal | Zaurbek Sidakov | Russia |
| silver medal | Avtandil Kentchadze | Georgia |
| bronze medal | Jordan Burroughs | United States |
| bronze medal | Bekzod Abdurakhmonov | Uzbekistan |

The men's freestyle 74 kilograms is a competition featured at the 2018 World Wrestling Championships, and was held in Budapest, Hungary on 20 and 21 October.

This freestyle wrestling competition consists of a single-elimination tournament, with a repechage used to determine the winner of two bronze medals. The two finalists face off for gold and silver medals. Each wrestler who loses to one of the two finalists moves into the repechage, culminating in a pair of bronze medal matches featuring the semifinal losers each facing the remaining repechage opponent from their half of the bracket.

== Results ==
Legend

- F — Won by fall
- WO — Won by walkover

=== Final ===
| Final |
| Zaurbek Sidakov (RUS) | 2 |
| Avtandil Kentchadze (GEO) | 2 |

=== Top half ===
Round of 32
Frank Chamizo (ITA) | 9
Gamid Dzhalilov (TJK) | 0
Ivan Kuskyak (UKR) | 4
Gong Byung-min (KOR) | 7
Zsombor Gulyás (HUN) | 3
Adanabasier (CHN) | 5
Bolat Sakayev (KAZ) | 9
Evgheni Nedealco (MDA) | 3
Miroslav Kirov (BUL) | 0
Zaurbek Sidakov (RUS) | 10
Franklin Gómez (PUR) | 13
Néstor Tafur (COL) | 2
Guy Delumeau (PLW) | 0
Mostafa Hosseinkhani (IRI) | 11
~~Venecious Juah (LBR)~~
Jordan Burroughs (USA) | WO

Round of 16
Frank Chamizo (ITA) | 5
Gong Byung-min (KOR) | 1
Adanabasier (CHN) | 0
Bolat Sakayev (KAZ) | 4^{F}
Zaurbek Sidakov (RUS) | 6
Franklin Gómez (PUR) | 0
Mostafa Hosseinkhani (IRI) | 3
Jordan Burroughs (USA) | 4

Quarterfinals
Frank Chamizo (ITA) | 6
Bolat Sakayev (KAZ) | 1
Zaurbek Sidakov (RUS) | 6
Jordan Burroughs (USA) | 5

Semifinals
Frank Chamizo (ITA) | 2
Zaurbek Sidakov (RUS) | 3

=== Bottom half ===
Round of 32
Achsarbek Gulajev (SVK) | 5
Jitender Kinha (IND) | 3
John Rojas (GUM) | 0
Soner Demirtaş (TUR) | 11
Rubén Espinoza (BOL) | 0
Yuhi Fujinami (JPN) | 10
Azamat Nurykau (BLR) | 10
Valter Margaryan (ARM) | 4
Abubakr Abakarov (AZE) | 10
Hanoch Rachamin (ISR) | 0
Zaur Efendiev (SRB) | 0
Ganzorigiin Mandakhnaran (MGL) | 8
Mustafa Mohamed Ali (SUD) | 0
Andrzej Sokalski (POL) | 10
Avtandil Kentchadze (GEO) | 12
Bekzod Abdurakhmonov (UZB) | 12

Round of 16
Achsarbek Gulajev (SVK) | 0
Soner Demirtaş (TUR) | 5
Yuhi Fujinami (JPN) | 6
Azamat Nurykau (BLR) | 8
Abubakr Abakarov (AZE) | 6
Ganzorigiin Mandakhnaran (MGL) | 5
Andrzej Sokalski (POL) | 2
Avtandil Kentchadze (GEO) | 12

Quarterfinals
Soner Demirtaş (TUR) | 2
Azamat Nurykau (BLR) | 0
Abubakr Abakarov (AZE) | 2
Avtandil Kentchadze (GEO) | 5

Semifinals
Soner Demirtaş (TUR) | 1
Avtandil Kentchadze (GEO) | 8^{F}

=== Repechage ===
Repechage round 1
Miroslav Kirov (BUL) | 6
Franklin Gómez (PUR) | 5
Bekzod Abdurakhmonov (UZB) | 12
Andrzej Sokalski (POL) | 1

Repechage round 2
Miroslav Kirov (BUL) | 0
Jordan Burroughs (USA) | 9
Bekzod Abdurakhmonov (UZB) | 7
Abubakr Abakarov (AZE) | 0

Bronze medals
Jordan Burroughs (USA) | 4
Frank Chamizo (ITA) | 4
Bekzod Abdurakhmonov (UZB) | 3
Soner Demirtaş (TUR) | 2
