= 2023 World Wrestling Championships – Men's freestyle 74 kg =

Wrestling competitions

Men's freestyle 74 kg at the 2023 World Championships
- Venue: Štark Arena
- Dates: 17–18 September 2023
- Competitors: 45 from 42 nations

Medalists
gold medal	Zaurbek Sidakov
silver medal	Kyle Dake	United States
bronze medal	Khetag Tsabolov	Serbia
bronze medal	Daichi Takatani	Japan

The men's freestyle 74 kilograms is a competition featured at the 2023 World Wrestling Championships, and was held in Belgrade, Serbia on 17 and 18 September 2023.

This freestyle wrestling competition consists of a single-elimination tournament, with a repechage used to determine the winner of two bronze medals. The two finalists face off for gold and silver medals. Each wrestler who loses to one of the two finalists moves into the repechage, culminating in a pair of bronze medal matches featuring the semifinal losers each facing the remaining repechage opponent from their half of the bracket.

== Results ==
Legend

- C — Won by 3 cautions given to the opponent
- F — Won by fall

=== Finals ===
Semifinals		Final
Turan Bayramov (AZE)	1
Zaurbek Sidakov (AIN)	5	Zaurbek Sidakov (AIN)	10
Georgios Kougioumtsidis (GRE)	1	Kyle Dake (USA)	7
Kyle Dake (USA)	4

=== Top half ===
==== Section 1 ====
Round of 64
Hrayr Alikhanyan (ARM)	7
Anthony Montero (VEN)	6
Tobias Portmann (SUI)	6
Naveen Malik (UWW)	12
Arsalan Budazhapov (KGZ)	3
Tim Müller (GER)	1

Round of 32
Soner Demirtaş (TUR)	10
Tymur Hudyma (UKR)	0
Abdul Jamal Spartan (UGA)	0
Hrayr Alikhanyan (ARM)	12^{F}
Naveen Malik (UWW)	4
Arsalan Budazhapov (KGZ)	6
Magomedrasul Asluev (BRN)	0
Turan Bayramov (AZE)	10

Round of 16
Soner Demirtaş (TUR)	3
Hrayr Alikhanyan (ARM)	0
Arsalan Budazhapov (KGZ)	0
Turan Bayramov (AZE)	8^{F}

Quarterfinals
Soner Demirtaş (TUR)	4
Turan Bayramov (AZE)	5

==== Section 2 ====
Round of 64
Adam Thomson (CAN)	11
Malik Amine (SMR)	6
Anthony Wesley (CPV)	0
Lu Feng (CHN)	10
Bekzod Abdurakhmonov (UZB)	12
Kamil Rybicki (POL)	1
Avtandil Kentchadze (GEO)	6
Zaurbek Sidakov (AIN)	7

Round of 32
Olonbayaryn Süldkhüü (MGL)	1
Khetag Tsabolov (SRB)	11
Adam Thomson (CAN)	0
Lu Feng (CHN)	10
Bekzod Abdurakhmonov (UZB)	0
Zaurbek Sidakov (AIN)	3
Ali-Pasha Umarpashaev (BUL)	0
Younes Emami (IRI)	6

Round of 16
Khetag Tsabolov (SRB)	13
Lu Feng (CHN)	2
Zaurbek Sidakov (AIN)	6
Younes Emami (IRI)	0

Quarterfinals
Khetag Tsabolov (SRB)	4
Zaurbek Sidakov (AIN)	6

=== Bottom half ===
==== Section 3 ====
Round of 64
Lee Seung-chul (KOR)	0
Rasul Shapiev (MKD)	8
Kakageldi Agaýew (TKM)	0
Shane Jones (PUR)	10
Georgios Kougioumtsidis (GRE)	7
Mahamedkhabib Kadzimahamedau (AIN)	6

Round of 32
Tajmuraz Salkazanov (SVK)	8
Vasile Diacon (MDA)	2
Inayat Ullah (PAK)	2
Rasul Shapiev (MKD)	3
Shane Jones (PUR)	3
Georgios Kougioumtsidis (GRE)	12
Mathayo Mahabila (KEN)	1
Mitch Finesilver (ISR)	11

Round of 16
Tajmuraz Salkazanov (SVK)	4
Rasul Shapiev (MKD)	3
Georgios Kougioumtsidis (GRE)	8
Mitch Finesilver (ISR)	4

Quarterfinals
Tajmuraz Salkazanov (SVK)	3
Georgios Kougioumtsidis (GRE)	4

==== Section 4 ====
Round of 64
Daichi Takatani (JPN)	7
Frank Chamizo (ITA)	2
Anthony Valencia (MEX)	10^{F}
Iakub Shikhdzamalov (ROU)	14
Erik Reinbok (EST)	4
Simon Marchl (AUT)	2

Round of 32
Murad Kuramagomedov (HUN)	10
Cesar Alvan (BRA)	0
Daichi Takatani (JPN)	17
Anthony Valencia (MEX)	5
Erik Reinbok (EST)	0
Nurkozha Kaipanov (KAZ)	10
Magomet Evloev (TJK)	2
Kyle Dake (USA)	12

Round of 16
Murad Kuramagomedov (HUN)	0
Daichi Takatani (JPN)	5
Nurkozha Kaipanov (KAZ)	4
Kyle Dake (USA)	9

Quarterfinals
Daichi Takatani (JPN)	4
Kyle Dake (USA)	6

=== Repechage ===
Repechage round 1
Avtandil Kentchadze (GEO)	10
Bekzod Abdurakhmonov (UZB)	4

Repechage round 2
Avtandil Kentchadze (GEO)	0
Younes Emami (IRI)	10
Magomet Evloev (TJK)	1
Nurkozha Kaipanov (KAZ)	6

Repechage round 3
Younes Emami (IRI)	4
Khetag Tsabolov (SRB)	11
Nurkozha Kaipanov (KAZ)	3
Daichi Takatani (JPN)	5

Bronze medals
Khetag Tsabolov (SRB)	6
Turan Bayramov (AZE)	4
Daichi Takatani (JPN)	6^{F}
Georgios Kougioumtsidis (GRE)	4

Olympic wrestle-off
Turan Bayramov (AZE)	8
Georgios Kougioumtsidis (GRE)	8^{C}

== Final standing ==
Rank	Athlete
1st place, gold medalist(s)	Zaurbek Sidakov (AIN)
2nd place, silver medalist(s)	Kyle Dake (USA)
3rd place, bronze medalist(s)	Khetag Tsabolov (SRB)
3rd place, bronze medalist(s)	Daichi Takatani (JPN)
5	Georgios Kougioumtsidis (GRE)
5	Turan Bayramov (AZE)
7	Lu Feng (CHN)
8	Nurkozha Kaipanov (KAZ)
9	Hrayr Alikhanyan (ARM)
10	Younes Emami (IRI)
11	Soner Demirtaş (TUR)
12	Tajmuraz Salkazanov (SVK)
13	Rasul Shapiev (MKD)
14	Anthony Valencia (MEX)
15	Arsalan Budazhapov (KGZ)
16	Bekzod Abdurakhmonov (UZB)
17	Mitch Finesilver (ISR)
18	Shane Jones (PUR)
19	Murad Kuramagomedov (HUN)
20	Naveen Malik (UWW)
21	Avtandil Kentchadze (GEO)
22	Adam Thomson (CAN)
23	Erik Reinbok (EST)
24	Magomet Evloev (TJK)
25	Anthony Montero (VEN)
26	Mahamedkhabib Kadzimahamedau (AIN)
27	Malik Amine (SMR)
28	Tobias Portmann (SUI)
29	Inayat Ullah (PAK)
30	Simon Marchl (AUT)
31	Frank Chamizo (ITA)
32	Vasile Diacon (MDA)
33	Tim Müller (GER)
34	Olonbayaryn Süldkhüü (MGL)
35	Mathayo Mahabila (KEN)
36	Kamil Rybicki (POL)
37	Iakub Shikhdzamalov (ROU)
38	Ali-Pasha Umarpashaev (BUL)
39	Lee Seung-chul (KOR)
40	Tymur Hudyma (UKR)
41	Magomedrasul Asluev (BRN)
42	Anthony Wesley (CPV)
43	Kakageldi Agaýew (TKM)
44	Cesar Alvan (BRA)
45	Abdul Jamal Spartan (UGA)

Qualified for the 2024 Summer Olympics
