= Wrestling at the 2020 Summer Olympics – Men's freestyle 74 kg =

Men's freestyle 74 kg at the Games of the XXXII Olympiad
- Venue: Makuhari Messe
- Date: 5–6 August 2021
- Competitors: 16 from 16 nations

Medalists
1st place, gold medalist(s)		Zaurbek Sidakov	ROC
2nd place, silver medalist(s)		Mahamedkhabib Kadzimahamedau	Belarus
3rd place, bronze medalist(s)		Kyle Dake	United States
3rd place, bronze medalist(s)		Bekzod Abdurakhmonov	Uzbekistan

The men's freestyle 74 kilograms competition at the 2020 Summer Olympics in Tokyo, Japan, took place on 5–6 August 2021 at the Makuhari Messe in Mihama-ku.

This freestyle wrestling competition consists of a single-elimination tournament, with a repechage used to determine the winner of two bronze medals. The two finalists face off for gold and silver medals. Each wrestler who loses to one of the two finalists moves into the repechage, culminating in a pair of bronze medal matches featuring the semifinal losers each facing the remaining repechage opponent from their half of the bracket.

== Schedule ==
All times are Japan Standard Time (UTC+09:00)

Date	Time	Event
5 August 2021	11:00	Qualification rounds
5 August 2021	18:15	Semifinals
6 August 2021	11:00	Repechage
6 August 2021	19:30	Finals

== Results ==
Legend

- F — Won by fall

=== Main bracket ===
1/8 finals
Frank Chamizo (ITA)	5
Avtandil Kentchadze (GEO)	1
Turan Bayramov (AZE)	4
Vasyl Mykhailov (UKR)	2
Geandry Garzón (CUB)	8
Mahamedkhabib Kadzimahamedau (BLR)	12
Kyle Dake (USA)	4
Mostafa Hosseinkhani (IRI)	0
Zaurbek Sidakov (ROC)	12
Augusto Midana (GBS)	2
Franklin Gómez (PUR)	0
Bekzod Abdurakhmonov (UZB)	10
Amr Reda Hussen (EGY)	6
Kamil Rybicki (POL)	1
Keisuke Otoguro (JPN)	2
Daniyar Kaisanov (KAZ)	2^{F}

1/4 finals
Frank Chamizo (ITA)	3
Turan Bayramov (AZE)	1
Mahamedkhabib Kadzimahamedau (BLR)	11
Kyle Dake (USA)	0
Zaurbek Sidakov (ROC)	13
Bekzod Abdurakhmonov (UZB)	6
Amr Reda Hussen (EGY)	5
Daniyar Kaisanov (KAZ)	8

Semifinals
Frank Chamizo (ITA)	7
Mahamedkhabib Kadzimahamedau (BLR)	9
Zaurbek Sidakov (ROC)	11
Daniyar Kaisanov (KAZ)	0

Final
Mahamedkhabib Kadzimahamedau (BLR)	0
Zaurbek Sidakov (ROC)	7

=== Repechage ===
Repechage
Geandry Garzón (CUB)	0
Kyle Dake (USA)	10
Augusto Midana (GBS)	0
Bekzod Abdurakhmonov (UZB)	10

Bronze medal matches
Kyle Dake (USA)	5
Frank Chamizo (ITA)	0
Bekzod Abdurakhmonov (UZB)	13
Daniyar Kaisanov (KAZ)	2

== Final standing ==
Rank	Athlete
1st place, gold medalist(s)	Zaurbek Sidakov (ROC)
2nd place, silver medalist(s)	Mahamedkhabib Kadzimahamedau (BLR)
3rd place, bronze medalist(s)	Kyle Dake (USA)
3rd place, bronze medalist(s)	Bekzod Abdurakhmonov (UZB)
5	Frank Chamizo (ITA)
5	Daniyar Kaisanov (KAZ)
7	Amr Reda Hussen (EGY)
8	Turan Bayramov (AZE)
9	Geandry Garzón (CUB)
10	Vasyl Mykhailov (UKR)
11	Augusto Midana (GBS)
12	Avtandil Kentchadze (GEO)
13	Kamil Rybicki (POL)
14	Keisuke Otoguro (JPN)
15	Mostafa Hosseinkhani (IRI)
16	Franklin Gómez (PUR)
