= 2023 Golden Grand Prix Ivan Yarygin =

Ivan Yarygin 2023
- Host city: Krasnoyarsk, Russia
- Dates: 26-29 January 2023
- Stadium: Ivan Yarygin Sports Palace

The XXXIV Golden Grand Prix Ivan Yarygin 2023, also known as Ivan Yarygin (Yariguin) 2023 is a freestyle wrestling international tournament was held in Krasnoyarsk, Russia between 26 and 29 January 2023.

== Event videos ==
The event will air freely on the wrestlingtv.ru channel.

Broadcasting
| 26 January 2023 Mat A | 26 January 2023 Mat B | 26 January 2023 Mat C |
| 27 January 2023 Mat A | 27 January 2023 Mat B | 27 January 2023 Mat C |
| 28 January 2023 Mat A | 28 January 2023 Mat B | 28 January 2023 Mat C |
| 29 January 2023 Mat A | 29 January 2023 Mat B | 29 January 2023 Mat C |

== Medal table ==
| Rank | Nation | Gold | Silver | Bronze | Total |
|---|---|---|---|---|---|
| 1 | Russia | 6 | 5 | 12 | 23 |
| 2 | Mongolia | 4 | 4 | 3 | 11 |
| 3 | Dagestan | 4 | 2 | 6 | 12 |
| 4 | (North Ossetia–Alania) North Ossetia-Alania | 3 | 2 | 7 | 12 |
| 5 | Belarus | 1 | 2 | 2 | 5 |
| 6 | Buryatia | 1 | 0 | 0 | 1 |
| 6 | Moscow Oblast | 1 | 0 | 0 | 1 |
| 8 | Kabardino-Balkaria | 0 | 2 | 2 | 4 |
| 9 | Bryansk Oblast | 0 | 1 | 0 | 1 |
| 9 | Chechnya | 0 | 1 | 0 | 1 |
| 9 | Kemerovo Oblast | 0 | 1 | 0 | 1 |
| 12 | Krasnoyarsk Krai | 0 | 0 | 2 | 2 |
| 13 | Greece | 0 | 0 | 1 | 1 |
| 13 | Iran | 0 | 0 | 1 | 1 |
| 13 | Kaliningrad | 0 | 0 | 1 | 1 |
| 13 | Kyrgyzstan | 0 | 0 | 1 | 1 |
| 13 | Sakha Republic | 0 | 0 | 1 | 1 |
| 13 | Uzbekistan | 0 | 0 | 1 | 1 |
| Totals (18 entries) | | 20 | 20 | 40 | 80 |

== Medal overview ==
=== Men's freestyle ===
| Event | Gold | Silver | Bronze |
|---|---|---|---|
| 57 kg | Zaur Uguev; Dagestan | Akhmed Idrisov; Dagestan | Ramiz Gamzatov; Dagestan |
| 57 kg | Zaur Uguev; Dagestan | Akhmed Idrisov; Dagestan | Azamat Tuskaev; North Ossetia |
| 61 kg | Muslim Mekhtikhanov; Dagestan | Tümenbilegiin Tüvshintulga; Mongolia | Abasgadzhi Magomedov; Dagestan |
| 61 kg | Muslim Mekhtikhanov; Dagestan | Tümenbilegiin Tüvshintulga; Mongolia | Chermen Tavitov; North Ossetia |
| 65 kg | Shamil Mamedov; Moscow Oblast | Gadzhimurad Rashidov; Dagestan | Ibragim Ibragimov; Dagestan |
| 65 kg | Shamil Mamedov; Moscow Oblast | Gadzhimurad Rashidov; Dagestan | Daniil Kharchilava; Kaliningrad Oblast |
| 70 kg | Yevgeny Zherbaev; Buryatia | Inalbek Sheriev; Kabardino-Balkaria | Kurban Shiraev; Dagestan |
| 70 kg | Yevgeny Zherbaev; Buryatia | Inalbek Sheriev; Kabardino-Balkaria | Konstantin Kapranov; Yakutia |
| 74 kg | Zaurbek Sidakov; North Ossetia | Timur Bizhoev; Kabardino-Balkaria | Chermen Valiev; North Ossetia |
| 74 kg | Zaurbek Sidakov; North Ossetia | Timur Bizhoev; Kabardino-Balkaria | David Baev; North Ossetia |
| 79 kg | Akhmed Usmanov; Dagestan | Gadzhimurad Alikhmaev; Bryansk Oblast | Radik Valiev; North Ossetia |
| 79 kg | Akhmed Usmanov; Dagestan | Gadzhimurad Alikhmaev; Bryansk Oblast | Azret Ulimbashev; Kabardino-Balkaria |
| 86 kg | Arslan Bagaev; North Ossetia | Ruslan Chertkoev; North Ossetia | Arseniy Dzhioev; North Ossetia |
| 86 kg | Arslan Bagaev; North Ossetia | Ruslan Chertkoev; North Ossetia | Omar Ziyautdinov; Dagestan |
| 92 kg | Alan Bagaev; North Ossetia | Vladislav Valiev; North Ossetia | Azamat Zakuev; Kabardino-Balkaria |
| 92 kg | Alan Bagaev; North Ossetia | Vladislav Valiev; North Ossetia | Askhab Saadulaev; Dagestan |
| 97 kg | Magomed Kurbanov; Dagestan | Alikhan Zhabrailov; Chechnya | Igor Ovsyannikov; Krasnoyarsk Krai |
| 97 kg | Magomed Kurbanov; Dagestan | Alikhan Zhabrailov; Chechnya | Georgy Dzhioev; North Ossetia |
| 125 kg | Dzianis Khramiankou; Belarus | Ostap Pasenok; Kemerovo Oblast | Erik Dzhioev; Krasnoyarsk Krai |
| 125 kg | Dzianis Khramiankou; Belarus | Ostap Pasenok; Kemerovo Oblast | Mostafa Tagani; Iran |

=== Women's freestyle ===
| Event | Gold | Silver | Bronze |
|---|---|---|---|
| 50 kg | Maria Tiumerekova; Russia | Tsogt-Ochiryn Namuuntsetseg; Mongolia | Aleksandara Karamzina; Russia |
| 50 kg | Maria Tiumerekova; Russia | Tsogt-Ochiryn Namuuntsetseg; Mongolia | Polina Lukina; Russia |
| 53 kg | Milana Dadasheva; Russia | Ekaterina Verbina; Russia | Natalia Malysheva; Russia |
| 53 kg | Milana Dadasheva; Russia | Ekaterina Verbina; Russia | Maria Prevolaraki; Greece |
| 55 kg | Irina Ologonova; Russia | Ekaterina Poleshchuk; Russia | Otgonjargal Ganbaatar; Mongolia |
| 55 kg | Irina Ologonova; Russia | Ekaterina Poleshchuk; Russia | Sevil Nazarova; Russia |
| 57 kg | Erdenechimegiin Sumiyaa; Mongolia | Anastasiia Sidelnikova; Russia | Alexandra Andreeva; Russia |
| 57 kg | Erdenechimegiin Sumiyaa; Mongolia | Anastasiia Sidelnikova; Russia | Kristina Mikheeva; Russia |
| 59 kg | Erkhembayaryn Davaachimeg; Mongolia | Yuliya Pisarenka; Belarus | Svetlana Lipatova; Russia |
| 59 kg | Erkhembayaryn Davaachimeg; Mongolia | Yuliya Pisarenka; Belarus | Khürelkhüügiin Bolortuyaa; Mongolia |
| 62 kg | Boldsaikhan Khongorzul; Mongolia | Anastasia Yakovleva; Russia | Kristina Tamrazyan; Russia |
| 62 kg | Boldsaikhan Khongorzul; Mongolia | Anastasia Yakovleva; Russia | Veranika Ivanova; Belarus |
| 65 kg | Zlatoslava Stepanova; Russia | Purevsuren Ulziisaykhan; Mongolia | Mariia Lachugina; Russia |
| 65 kg | Zlatoslava Stepanova; Russia | Purevsuren Ulziisaykhan; Mongolia | Tatsiana Paulava; Belarus |
| 68 kg | Khanum Velieva; Russia | Kseniia Burakova; Russia | Enkhsaikhan Delgermaa; Mongolia |
| 68 kg | Khanum Velieva; Russia | Kseniia Burakova; Russia | Nurzat Nurtayeva; Kyrgyzstan |
| 72 kg | Ochirbatyn Burmaa; Mongolia | Davaanasan Enkh-Amar; Mongolia | Marina Surovtseva; Russia |
| 72 kg | Ochirbatyn Burmaa; Mongolia | Davaanasan Enkh-Amar; Mongolia | Mardona Kadamova; Uzbekistan |
| 76 kg | Ekaterina Bukina; Russia | Anastasia Zimenkova; Belarus | Evgeniia Zakharchenko; Russia |
| 76 kg | Ekaterina Bukina; Russia | Anastasia Zimenkova; Belarus | Rita Talismanova; Russia |
