= 2015 European U23 Wrestling Championships =

2015 European U23 Wrestling Championship
- Host city: Wałbrzych, Poland
- Dates: March 24–29, 2015

Champions
- Freestyle: Russia
- Greco-Roman: Russia
- Women: Russia

The 2015 European U23 Wrestling Championships was the first edition of European U23 Wrestling Championships of combined events, and took place from March 24 to 29 in Wałbrzych, Poland.

== Medal table ==
* Host nation (Poland)

Rank	Nation	Gold	Silver	Bronze	Total
1	Russia	7	2	7	16
2	Georgia	3	2	4	9
3	Belarus	2	2	4	8
4	Moldova	2	0	3	5
5	Ukraine	1	3	3	7
6	Azerbaijan	1	2	6	9
7	Armenia	1	2	1	4
8	Germany	1	1	1	3
9	Finland	1	1	0	2
9	Serbia	1	1	0	2
9	Sweden	1	1	0	2
12	Turkey	1	0	9	10
13	Poland*	1	0	2	3
14	Italy	1	0	0	1
15	Bulgaria	0	3	1	4
16	Croatia	0	1	0	1
16	Czech Republic	0	1	0	1
16	Estonia	0	1	0	1
16	Romania	0	1	0	1
20	Hungary	0	0	5	5
21	North Macedonia	0	0	1	1
21	Norway	0	0	1	1
Totals (22 entries)		24	24	48	96

== Team ranking ==
Rank	Men's freestyle		Men's Greco-Roman		Women's freestyle	
Rank	Team	Points	Team	Points	Team	Points
1	Russia	62	Russia	50	Russia	56
2	Georgia	57	Georgia	40	Belarus	51
3	Azerbaijan	48	Turkey	35	Ukraine	50
4	Turkey	44	Moldova	34	Turkey	43
5	Armenia	36	Belarus	32	Azerbaijan	34

== Medal summary ==
=== Men's freestyle ===
Event	Gold	Silver	Bronze
57 kg	(Russia) Ismail Musukaev	(Bulgaria) Georgi Vangelov	(Georgia (country)) Beka Budjiashvili
57 kg	(Russia) Ismail Musukaev	(Bulgaria) Georgi Vangelov	(Turkey) Nebi Uzun
61 kg	(Armenia) Valodya Frangulyan	(Ukraine) Andrii Svryd	(Moldova) Mihai Esanu
61 kg	(Armenia) Valodya Frangulyan	(Ukraine) Andrii Svryd	(Turkey) Recep Topal
65 kg	(Italy) Frank Chamizo	(Georgia (country)) Zurabi Iakobishvili	(Azerbaijan) Magomed Muslimov
65 kg	(Italy) Frank Chamizo	(Georgia (country)) Zurabi Iakobishvili	(Russia) Yevgeny Zherbaev
70 kg	(Russia) Rasul Arsanaliev	(Ukraine) Ivan Kusyak	(Belarus) Andrei Karpach
70 kg	(Russia) Rasul Arsanaliev	(Ukraine) Ivan Kusyak	(Moldova) Alexandru Codreanu
74 kg	(Georgia (country)) Zurab Erbotsonashvili	(Armenia) Armen Azaryan	(Turkey) Murat Ertürk
74 kg	(Georgia (country)) Zurab Erbotsonashvili	(Armenia) Armen Azaryan	(Hungary) Mihaly Nagy
86 kg	(Belarus) Aliaksandr Hushtyn	(Azerbaijan) Magomedgadzhi Khatiyev	(Russia) Shamil Kudiyamagomedov
86 kg	(Belarus) Aliaksandr Hushtyn	(Azerbaijan) Magomedgadzhi Khatiyev	(North Macedonia) Halil Zubairov
97 kg	(Georgia (country)) Omar Gusoshvili	(Azerbaijan) Nurmagomed Gadzhiev	(Russia) Zaynulla Kurbanov
97 kg	(Georgia (country)) Omar Gusoshvili	(Azerbaijan) Nurmagomed Gadzhiev	(Turkey) Yusuf Can Zeybek
125 kg	(Russia) Muradin Kushkhov	(Georgia (country)) Giorgi Meshvildishvili	(Poland) Robert Baran
125 kg	(Russia) Muradin Kushkhov	(Georgia (country)) Giorgi Meshvildishvili	(Azerbaijan) Ali Magomedabirov

=== Men's Greco-Roman ===
Event	Gold	Silver	Bronze
59 kg	(Moldova) Victor Ciobanu	(Russia) Zaur Kabaloev	(Azerbaijan) Eldaniz Azizli
59 kg	(Moldova) Victor Ciobanu	(Russia) Zaur Kabaloev	(Georgia (country)) Khvicha Tchitava
66 kg	(Russia) Artem Surkov	(Croatia) Dominik Etlinger	(Georgia (country)) Giori Davitaia
66 kg	(Russia) Artem Surkov	(Croatia) Dominik Etlinger	(Turkey) Enes Başar
71 kg	(Moldova) Daniel Cataraga	(Sweden) Daniel Soini	(Russia) Aleksei Kiiankin
71 kg	(Moldova) Daniel Cataraga	(Sweden) Daniel Soini	(Hungary) Zoltán Lévai
75 kg	(Serbia) Viktor Nemes	(Belarus) Kazbek Kilou	(Armenia) Karapet Chalyan
75 kg	(Serbia) Viktor Nemes	(Belarus) Kazbek Kilou	(Moldova) Petru Sevciuc
80 kg	(Georgia (country)) Lasha Gobadze	(Armenia) Sargis Kocharyan	(Turkey) Doğan Göktaş
80 kg	(Georgia (country)) Lasha Gobadze	(Armenia) Sargis Kocharyan	(Belarus) Radik Kuliev
85 kg	(Germany) Denis Kudla	(Serbia) Vladimir Stankic	(Azerbaijan) Islam Abbasov
85 kg	(Germany) Denis Kudla	(Serbia) Vladimir Stankic	(Poland) Krystian Formela
98 kg	(Turkey) Fatih Başköy	(Finland) Toumas Lahti	(Bulgaria) Evgeni Gechev
98 kg	(Turkey) Fatih Başköy	(Finland) Toumas Lahti	(Georgia (country)) Kukuri Kirtskhalia
130 kg	(Russia) Sergey Semenov	(Ukraine) Mykola Kuchmii	(Germany) Christian John
130 kg	(Russia) Sergey Semenov	(Ukraine) Mykola Kuchmii	(Norway) Felix Baldauf

=== Women's freestyle ===
Event	Gold	Silver	Bronze
48 kg	(Russia) Nadezhda Fedorova	(Romania) Alina Vuc	(Belarus) Vanesa Kaladzinskaya
48 kg	(Russia) Nadezhda Fedorova	(Romania) Alina Vuc	(Turkey) Evin Demirhan
53 kg	(Ukraine) Lilya Horishna	(Belarus) Iryna Kurachkina	(Russia) Olga Khoroshavtseva
53 kg	(Ukraine) Lilya Horishna	(Belarus) Iryna Kurachkina	(Azerbaijan) Solmaz Hashimzade
55 kg	(Azerbaijan) Alyona Kolesnik	(Bulgaria) Evelina Nikolova	(Belarus) Zalina Sidakova
55 kg	(Azerbaijan) Alyona Kolesnik	(Bulgaria) Evelina Nikolova	(Ukraine) Larysa Skoblyuk
58 kg	(Russia) Valeriia Koblova	(Bulgaria) Mimi Hristova	(Ukraine) Tetiana Omelchenko
58 kg	(Russia) Valeriia Koblova	(Bulgaria) Mimi Hristova	(Hungary) Ramona Galambos
60 kg	(Finland) Petra Olli	(Russia) Svetlana Lipatova	(Ukraine) Oksana Herhel
60 kg	(Finland) Petra Olli	(Russia) Svetlana Lipatova	(Turkey) Hafize Şahin
63 kg	(Belarus) Maryia Mamashuk	(Czech Republic) Adéla Hanzlíčková	(Turkey) Buse Tosun
63 kg	(Belarus) Maryia Mamashuk	(Czech Republic) Adéla Hanzlíčková	(Azerbaijan) Elmira Gambarova
69 kg	(Sweden) Fanny Grandin	(Germany) Anna Schell	(Russia) Tatiana Morozova
69 kg	(Sweden) Fanny Grandin	(Germany) Anna Schell	(Hungary) Klaudia Sandor
75 kg	(Poland) Daria Osocka	(Estonia) Epp Mae	(Russia) Anzhela Kataeva
75 kg	(Poland) Daria Osocka	(Estonia) Epp Mae	(Hungary) Zsanett Nemeth
