= Golden Grand Prix Ivan Yarygin 2018 – Men's freestyle 74 kg =

The men's freestyle 74 kg is a wrestling competition featured at the Golden Grand Prix Ivan Yarygin 2018, and was held in Krasnoyarsk, Russia on the 28 January.

== Medalists ==
Gold	(North Ossetia–Alania) Khetag Tsabolov
Silver	(North Ossetia–Alania) Zaurbek Sidakov
Bronze	(North Ossetia–Alania) Kakhaber Khubezthy
Bronze	(Turkmenistan) Döwletmyrat Orazgylyjow

== Results ==
Legend

- F — Won by fall

=== Final ===
Final
(North Ossetia–Alania) Zaurbek Sidakov	1
(North Ossetia–Alania) Khetag Tsabolov	3

=== Top half ===
- qualification: Zaurbek Sidakov of North Ossetia-Alania def. Nikita Suchkov of Krasnoyarsk (11–6)
- qualification: Kakhaber Khubezthy of North Ossetia-Alania def. Magomedkhabib Kadikmagomedov of Dagestan (6-3)

==== Section 1 ====
Round of 8
(China) Wei Wu	0
(North Ossetia–Alania) Khetag Tsabolov	10
(Turkmenistan) Döwletmyrat Orazgylyjow	13
(United States) Joseph Tavoso	0
(Mongolia) Ganzorigiin Mandakhnaran	5
(Turkey) Muhammet Akdeniz	2
(Bulgaria) Ali Umarpashaev	10
(Kyrgyzstan) Bekzhan Dzhambulov	6

Quarterfinals
(North Ossetia–Alania) Zaurbek Sidakov	13
(Turkey) Muhammet Demir	2
(Mongolia) Sumiyabazar Zandanbud	0
(North Ossetia–Alania) Kakhaber Khubezthy	10
(North Ossetia–Alania) Khetag Tsabolov	13
(Turkmenistan) Döwletmyrat Orazgylyjow	2
(Mongolia) Ganzorigiin Mandakhnaran	16
(Bulgaria) Ali Umarpashaev	6

Semifinals
(North Ossetia–Alania) Zaurbek Sidakov	5
(North Ossetia–Alania) Kakhaber Khubezthy	0
(North Ossetia–Alania) Khetag Tsabolov	5
(Mongolia) Ganzorigiin Mandakhnaran	3

Final
-

== Repechage ==
Repechage round 1
-
-
-
-

Repechage round 2
-
-
(China) Wei Wu	0
(Turkmenistan) Döwletmyrat Orazgylyjow	10

Bronze medals
(Turkey) Muhammet Demir	0
(North Ossetia–Alania) Kakhaber Khubezthy	10
(Turkmenistan) Döwletmyrat Orazgylyjow	9
(Mongolia) Ganzorigiin Mandakhnaran	0
