= 2019 European Wrestling Championships – Men's freestyle 74 kg =

The men's freestyle 74 kg is a competition featured at the 2019 European Wrestling Championships, and was held in Bucharest, Romania on April 9 and April 10.

== Medalists ==
Gold	Frank Chamizo; Italy
Silver	Zelimkhan Khadjiev; France
Bronze	Timur Bizhoev; Russia
Bronze	Avtandil Kentchadze; Georgia

== Results ==
Legend

- F — Won by fall
- WO — Won by walkover

=== Final ===
Final
Frank Chamizo (ITA)	8
Zelimkhan Khadjiev (FRA)	0

=== Top half ===
Round of 32

Round of 16
Andrius Mažeika (LTU)	0
Miroslav Kirov (BUL)	7
Timur Bizhoev (RUS)	0
Frank Chamizo (ITA)	3
Maxim Vasilioglo (ROU)	6
Dániel Antal (HUN)	0
Gheorghi Pascalov (MDA)	1
Khadzhimurad Gadzhiyev (AZE)	10

Quarterfinals
Miroslav Kirov (BUL)	0
Frank Chamizo (ITA)	5
Maxim Vasilioglo (ROU)	0
Khadzhimurad Gadzhiyev (AZE)	11

Semifinals
Frank Chamizo (ITA)	6
Khadzhimurad Gadzhiyev (AZE)	2

=== Bottom half ===
Round of 32
Kyrillos Binenmpaoum (GRE)	5
Jonathan Álvarez Díaz (ESP)	0
Johann Steinforth (GER)	2
Azamat Nurykau (BLR)	14
Yakup Gör (TUR)	10
Hanoch Rachamin (ISR)	0
Avtandil Kentchadze (GEO)	10
Varuzhan Kajoyan (ARM)	0
Aimar Andruse (EST)	12
Mateusz Kampik (POL)	3
Zelimkhan Khadjiev (FRA)	8
Simon Marchl (AUT)	0

Round of 16
Jakub Sýkora (SVK)	1
Vasyl Mykhailov (UKR)	12
Kyrillos Binenmpaoum (GRE)	4
Azamat Nurykau (BLR)	12
Yakup Gör (TUR)	0
Avtandil Kentchadze (GEO)	10
Aimar Andruse (EST)	1
Zelimkhan Khadjiev (FRA)	7

Quarterfinals
Vasyl Mykhailov (UKR)	5
Azamat Nurykau (BLR)	3
Avtandil Kentchadze (GEO)	3
Zelimkhan Khadjiev (FRA)	3

Semifinals
Vasyl Mykhailov (UKR)	2
Zelimkhan Khadjiev (FRA)	4

=== Repechage ===
Repechage round 1
Simon Marchl (AUT)	3
Aimar Andruse (EST)	5

Repechage round 2
Timur Bizhoev (RUS)	6^{F}
Miroslav Kirov (BUL)	0
Aimar Andruse (EST)	3
Avtandil Kentchadze (GEO)	12

Bronze medal match
Timur Bizhoev (RUS)	6
Khadzhimurad Gadzhiyev (AZE)	4
Avtandil Kentchadze (GEO)	12
Vasyl Mykhailov (UKR)	1
