= Fazlı Eryılmaz =

Turkish freestyle wrestler

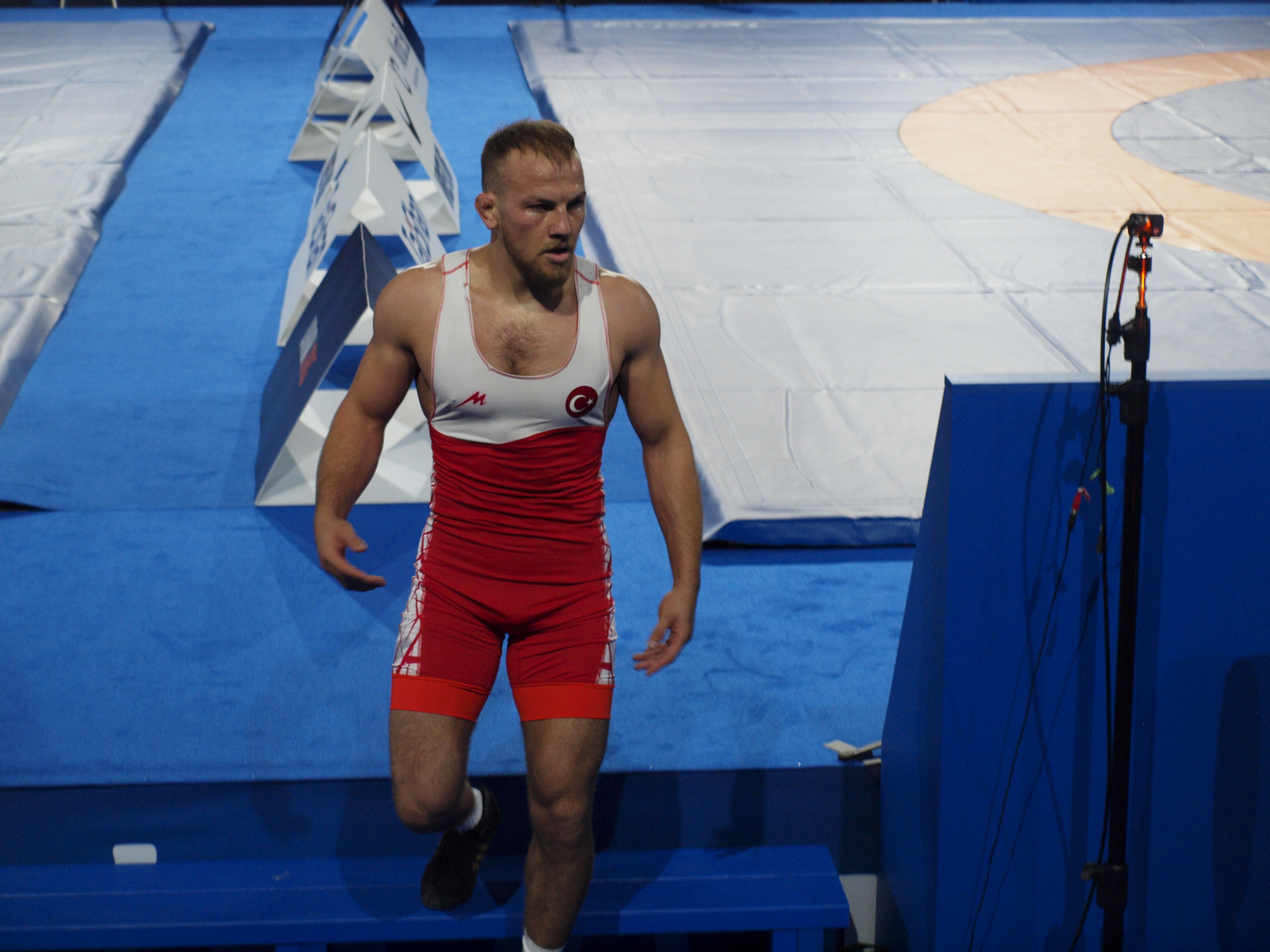
- Fazlı Eryılmaz at the 2021 World Wrestling Championships in Oslo, Norway

Personal information
- Born: 10 January 1997 (age 29) Tokat, Turkey
- Height: 1.75 m (5 ft 9 in)
- Weight: 74 kg (163 lb; 11.7 st)

Sport
- Country: Turkey
- Sport: Amateur wrestling
- Event: Freestyle
- Club: İstanbul Büyükşehir Belediyesi S.K.
Medal record
Men's freestyle wrestling
Representing Turkey
World Championships
Bronze medal – third place	2021 Oslo	74 kg
Individual World Cup
Bronze medal – third place	2020 Belgrade	74 kg
Islamic Solidarity Games
Bronze medal – third place	2021 Konya	74 kg
World Military Championships
Bronze medal – third place	2024 Yerevan	74 kg
Yasar Dogu Tournament
Silver medal – second place	2022 Istanbul	74 kg
Bronze medal – third place	2019 Istanbul	74 kg
Grand Prix
Bronze medal – third place	2020 Rome	74 kg
Bronze medal – third place	2023 Zagreb	74 kg

Fazlı Eryılmaz is a Turkish freestyle wrestler competing in the 74 kg division of Freestyle wrestling. He is a member of the İstanbul Büyükşehir Belediyesi S.K.

== Career ==
In 2020, he won the bronze medal in the men's 74 kg event at the 2020 Individual Wrestling World Cup held in Belgrade, Serbia.

Fazlı Eryılmaz took a bronze medal in the 2021 World Wrestling Championships held in Oslo on Oct. 3. Eryılmaz, 24, beat his Belarusian opponent Azamat Nurykau 2-1 in men's freestyle 74 kg bronze medal match to come third in this tournament.

In 2022, he won the silver medal in his event at the Yasar Dogu Tournament held in Istanbul, Turkey. He won one of the bronze medals in the men's 74 kg event at the 2021 Islamic Solidarity Games held in Konya, Turkey.
