= 2021 World Wrestling Championships – Men's freestyle 70 kg =

Wrestling competitions

Men's freestyle 70 kg at the 2021 World Championships
- Venue: Nye Jordal Amfi
- Dates: 4–5 October 2021
- Competitors: 26 from 26 nations

Medalists
gold medal	Magomedmurad Gadzhiev	Poland
silver medal	Ernazar Akmataliev	Kyrgyzstan
bronze medal	Yevgeny Zherbaev	RWF
bronze medal	Zurabi Iakobishvili	Georgia

The men's freestyle 70 kilograms is a competition featured at the 2021 World Wrestling Championships, and was held in Oslo, Norway on 4 and 5 October.

This freestyle wrestling competition consists of a single-elimination tournament, with a repechage used to determine the winner of two bronze medals. The two finalists face off for gold and silver medals. Each wrestler who loses to one of the two finalists moves into the repechage, culminating in a pair of bronze medal matches featuring the semifinal losers each facing the remaining repechage opponent from their half of the bracket.

== Results ==
Legend

- F — Won by fall

=== Final ===
Final
Ernazar Akmataliev (KGZ)	1
Magomedmurad Gadzhiev (POL)	2

=== Top half ===
Round of 32
Ivan Kusyak (UKR)	12
Dániel Antal (HUN)	2
Jintaro Motoyama (JPN)	0
Erfan Elahi (IRI)	8
Nicolai Grahmez (MDA)	6
Daniel Chomanič (SVK)	2
Anil Munasinghe (SRI)	0
Ernazar Akmataliev (KGZ)	10

Round of 16
Syrbaz Talgat (KAZ)	1
Yevgeny Zherbaev (RWF)	10
Batchuluuny Batmagnai (MGL)	5
Ivan Kusyak (UKR)	0
Erfan Elahi (IRI)	4
Nicolai Grahmez (MDA)	2
Ernazar Akmataliev (KGZ)	11
Arman Andreasyan (ARM)	2

Quarterfinals
Yevgeny Zherbaev (RWF)	9^{F}
Batchuluuny Batmagnai (MGL)	0
Erfan Elahi (IRI)	8
Ernazar Akmataliev (KGZ)	8

Semifinals
Yevgeny Zherbaev (RWF)	5
Ernazar Akmataliev (KGZ)	9

=== Bottom half ===
Round of 32
Magomedmurad Gadzhiev (POL)	9
Nicolae Cojocaru (GBR)	0
Zurabi Iakobishvili (GEO)	5
Sushil (IND)	2
Hussein Al-Azzani (YEM)	0
Mustafa Kaya (TUR)	10
Shamil Ustaev (GER)	4
Gianluca Talamo (ITA)	3
James Green (USA)	10
Lee Seung-chul (KOR)	0
Zaur Efendiev (SRB)	0
Adam Batirov (BRN)	8

Round of 16
Carlos Romero (CHI)	4
Magomedmurad Gadzhiev (POL)	15
Zurabi Iakobishvili (GEO)	7
Mustafa Kaya (TUR)	2
Shamil Ustaev (GER)	0
James Green (USA)	10
Adam Batirov (BRN)	2
Turan Bayramov (AZE)	3

Quarterfinals
Magomedmurad Gadzhiev (POL)	4
Zurabi Iakobishvili (GEO)	1
James Green (USA)	5
Turan Bayramov (AZE)	6

Semifinals
Magomedmurad Gadzhiev (POL)	4
Turan Bayramov (AZE)	2

=== Repechage ===
Repechage round 1
Anil Munasinghe (SRI)	0
Arman Andreasyan (ARM)	10
Nicolae Cojocaru (GBR)	14
Carlos Romero (CHI)	1

Repechage round 2
Arman Andreasyan (ARM)	6
Erfan Elahi (IRI)	5
Nicolae Cojocaru (GBR)	0
Zurabi Iakobishvili (GEO)	5

Bronze medals
Arman Andreasyan (ARM)	0
Yevgeny Zherbaev (RWF)	6
Zurabi Iakobishvili (GEO)	4
Turan Bayramov (AZE)	3

== Final standing ==
Rank	Athlete
1st place, gold medalist(s)	Magomedmurad Gadzhiev (POL)
2nd place, silver medalist(s)	Ernazar Akmataliev (KGZ)
3rd place, bronze medalist(s)	Yevgeny Zherbaev (RWF)
3rd place, bronze medalist(s)	Zurabi Iakobishvili (GEO)
5	Arman Andreasyan (ARM)
5	Turan Bayramov (AZE)
7	James Green (USA)
8	Erfan Elahi (IRI)
9	Mustafa Kaya (TUR)
10	Nicolae Cojocaru (GBR)
11	Ivan Kusyak (UKR)
12	Adam Batirov (BRN)
13	Nicolai Grahmez (MDA)
14	Batchuluuny Batmagnai (MGL)
15	Shamil Ustaev (GER)
16	Carlos Romero (CHI)
17	Gianluca Talamo (ITA)
18	Sushil (IND)
19	Daniel Chomanič (SVK)
20	Dániel Antal (HUN)
21	Syrbaz Talgat (KAZ)
22	Jintaro Motoyama (JPN)
23	Zaur Efendiev (SRB)
24	Hussein Al-Azzani (YEM)
25	Lee Seung-chul (KOR)
26	Anil Munasinghe (SRI)
