= 2020 Individual Wrestling World Cup – Men's freestyle 74 kg =

The men's freestyle 74 kilograms is a competition featured at the 2020 Individual Wrestling World Cup, and was held in Belgrade, Serbia on 16 and 17 December 2020.

== Medalists ==
Gold	Razambek Zhamalov; Russia
Silver	Frank Chamizo; Italy
Bronze	Tajmuraz Salkazanov; Slovakia
Bronze	Fazlı Eryılmaz; Turkey

== Results ==
Legend

- F — Won by fall
- WO — Won by walkover

1/16 finals
	Score	
Frank Chamizo (ITA)	8–0	Augusto Midana (GBS)
Zaur Efendiev (SRB)	WO	Fazlı Eryılmaz (TUR)
Kubilay Cakici (GER)	10–9	Narsingh Yadav (IND)
Hrayr Alikhanyan (ARM)	9–0	Andrzej Sokalski (POL)
Jonatan Álvarez (ESP)	0–10	Azamat Nurykau (BLR)
Saiakbai Usupov (KGZ)	8–1	Aimar Andruse (EST)
Marc Dietsche (SUI)	WO	~~Orges Lila (ALB)~~
Ali-Pasha Umarpashaev (BUL)	13–0	Charles-André Afa (FRA)

1/8 finals
Evgheni Nedealco (MDA)	1
Maxim Vasilioglo (ROU)	12
Tajmuraz Salkazanov (SVK)	7
Denys Pavlov (UKR)	0
Razambek Zhamalov (RUS)	10
Mitch Finesilver (ISR)	0
Murad Kuramagomedov (HUN)	10
León Peralta (CHI)	0
Frank Chamizo (ITA)	9^{F}
Fazlı Eryılmaz (TUR)	6
Kubilay Cakici (GER)	2
Hrayr Alikhanyan (ARM)	7
Azamat Nurykau (BLR)	4
Saiakbai Usupov (KGZ)	3
Marc Dietsche (SUI)	0
Ali-Pasha Umarpashaev (BUL)	11

Quarterfinals
Maxim Vasilioglo (ROU)	0
Tajmuraz Salkazanov (SVK)	10
Razambek Zhamalov (RUS)	6
Murad Kuramagomedov (HUN)	0
Frank Chamizo (ITA)	8
Hrayr Alikhanyan (ARM)	2
Azamat Nurykau (BLR)	8
Ali-Pasha Umarpashaev (BUL)	4

Semifinals
Tajmuraz Salkazanov (SVK)	0
Razambek Zhamalov (RUS)	5
Frank Chamizo (ITA)	10
Azamat Nurykau (BLR)	0

Final
Razambek Zhamalov (RUS)	4
Frank Chamizo (ITA)	2

Repechage round 1
Augusto Midana (GBS)	1
Fazlı Eryılmaz (TUR)	5

Repechage round 2
Mitch Finesilver (ISR)	1
Murad Kuramagomedov (HUN)	3
Fazlı Eryılmaz (TUR)	5
Hrayr Alikhanyan (ARM)	4

Bronze medals
Murad Kuramagomedov (HUN)	2
Tajmuraz Salkazanov (SVK)	2
Fazlı Eryılmaz (TUR)	7
Azamat Nurykau (BLR)	2
