= Cleopas Ncube =

Canadian wrestler

Personal information
- Nationality: Canadian
- Born: 21 November 1983 (age 41); Bulawayo, Zimbabwe
- Weight: 70 kg (150 lb)

Sport
- Sport: Freestyle wrestling
- Club: Montreal Wrestling Club

Cleopas Ncube (born November 21, 1983) is a Canadian wrestler. He finished in 4th place in the 70kg event at the 2014 World Wrestling Championships, losing the bronze medal final to Ali Shabanau of Belarus. He also ranked among the best in several international competitions, including the Dave Schultz International.
