= Yevgeny Zherbaev =

Russian freestyle wrestler

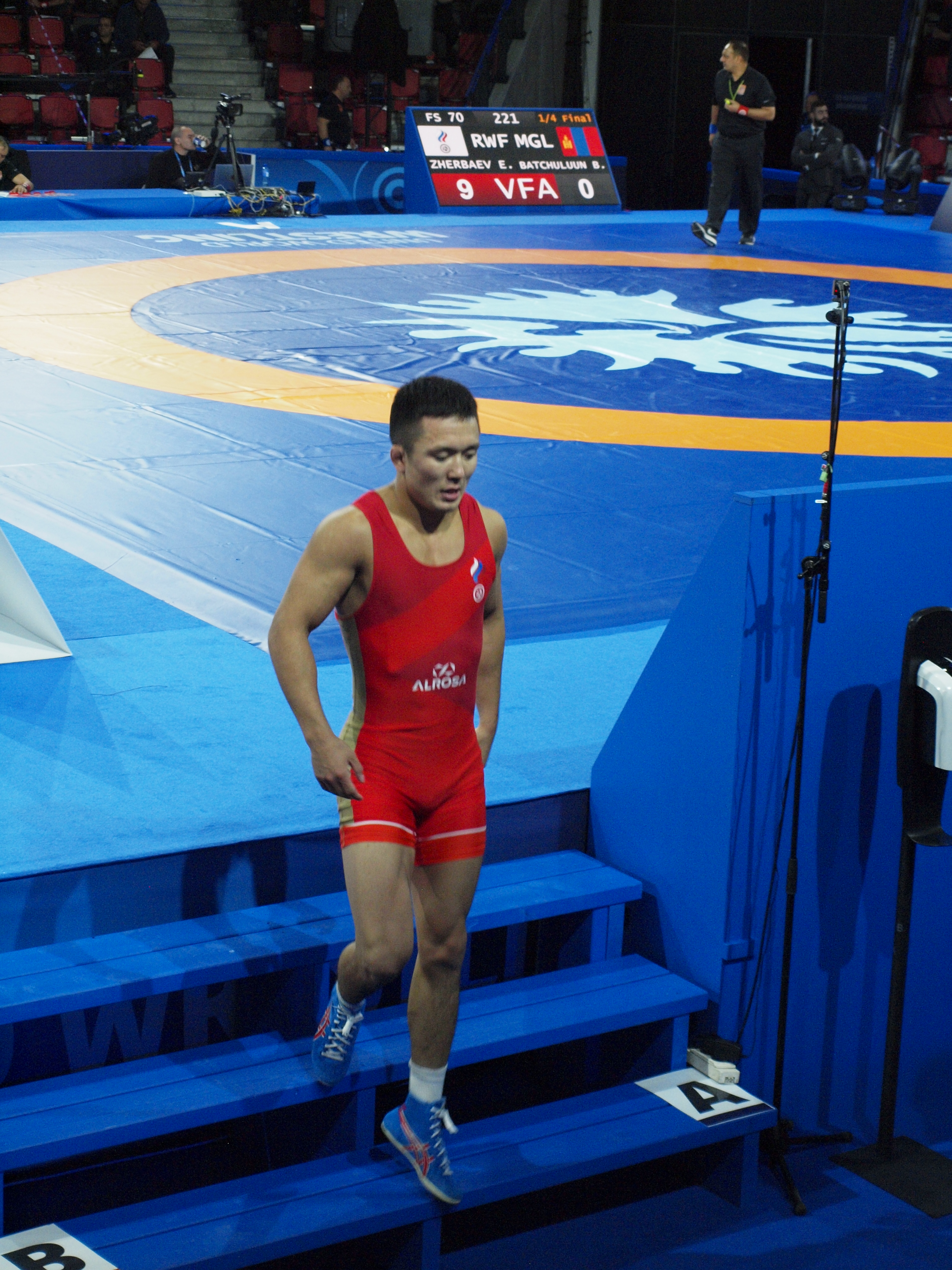
- Yevgeny Zherbaev at the 2021 World Wrestling Championships in Oslo, Norway

Personal information
- Native name: Евгений Александрович Жербаев
- Full name: Yevgeny Alexandrovich Zherbaev
- Nationality: Russia
- Born: 15 June 1994 (age 32) Ust-Orda Buryat Autonomous Okrug, Nukutsky District, Irkutsk, Russia
- Height: 175 cm (5 ft 9 in)

Sport
- Country: Russia
- Sport: Amateur wrestling
- Weight class: 70 kg
- Event: Freestyle

Achievements and titles
- World finals: (bronze) (2021)
- National finals: (gold) (2023)
Medal record
Men's freestyle wrestling
Representing Russian Wrestling Federation
World Championships
Bronze medal – third place	2021 Oslo	70 kg
Representing Russia
European U23 Championships
Bronze medal – third place	2015 Wlabrzych	65 kg
Representing Buryatia
Russian National Championships
Gold medal – first place	2023 Kaspiysk	70 kg
Silver medal – second place	2021 Ulan-Ude	70 kg
Bronze medal – third place	2019 Sochi	70 kg
Bronze medal – third place	2015 Kaspiysk	70 kg
Golden Grand Prix Ivan Yarygin
Gold medal – first place	2023 Krasnoyarsk	70 kg
Bronze medal – third place	2020 Krasnoyarsk	70 kg
Bronze medal – third place	2015 Krasnoyarsk	65 kg

Yevgeny Zherbaev is a Russian freestyle wrestler. He won one of the bronze medals in the men's 70 kg event at the 2021 World Wrestling Championships held in Oslo, Norway.

== Career ==
In January 2015, he won one of the bronze medals in the men's 65 kg event at the Golden Grand Prix Ivan Yarygin 2015 held in Krasnoyarsk, Russia. Two months later, at the 2015 European U23 Wrestling Championship held in Walbrzych, Poland, he also won one of the bronze medals in the men's 65 kg event. In that same year, he also won a bronze medal in the men's 70 kg event at the 2015 Russian National Freestyle Wrestling Championships held in Kaspiysk, Dagestan, Russia.

In the men's 70 kg event, he also won bronze at the 2019 Russian National Freestyle Wrestling Championships in Sochi, Russia and the Golden Grand Prix Ivan Yarygin 2020. A year later, he won silver in that event at the 2021 Russian National Freestyle Wrestling Championships in Ulan-Ude, Russia.

== Achievements ==
Year	Tournament	Venue	Result	Event
2021	World Championships	Oslo, Norway	3rd	Freestyle 70 kg
