= Timur Bizhoev =

Russian freestyle wrestler

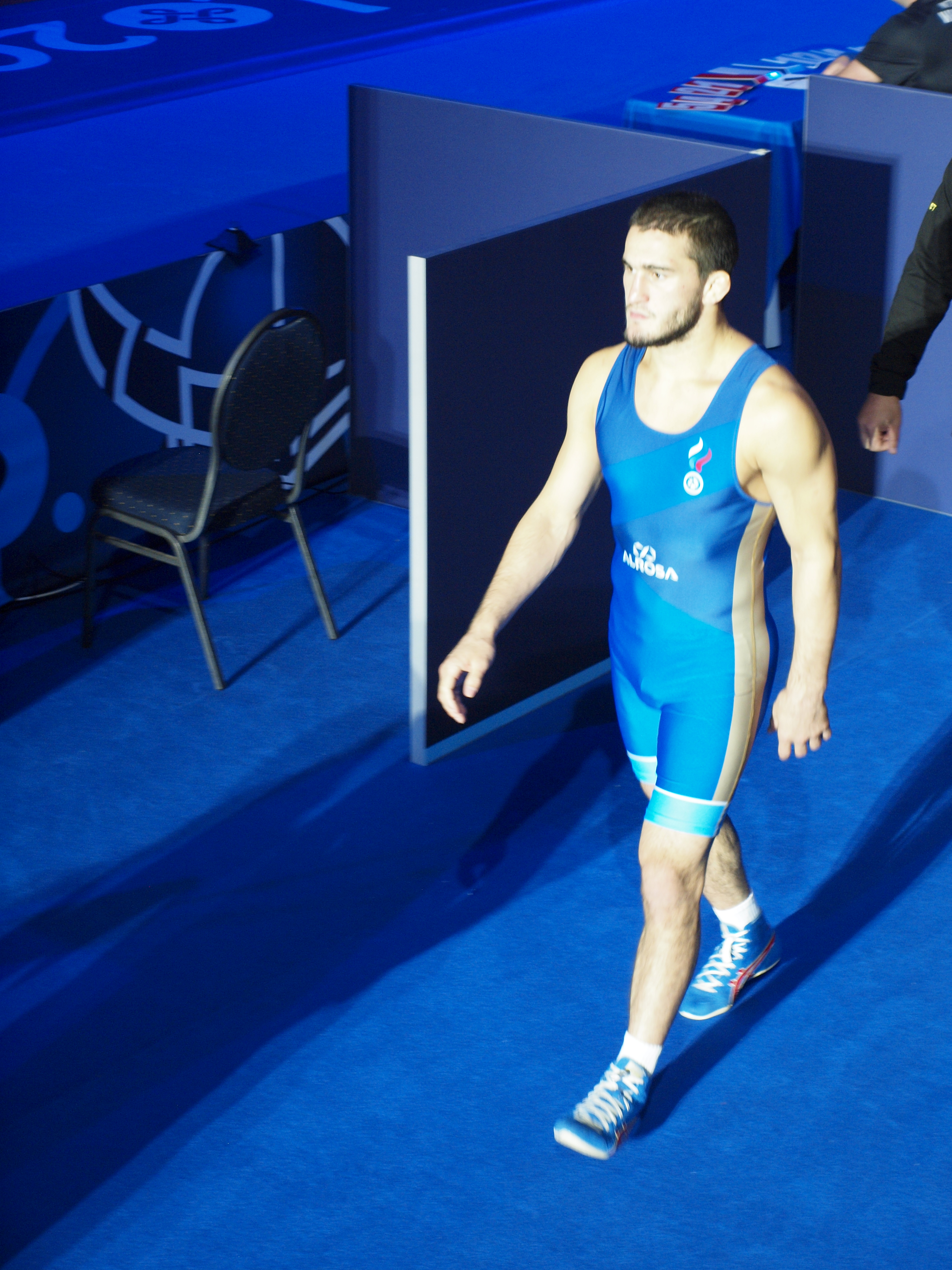
- Timur Bizhoev at the 2021 World Wrestling Championships in Oslo, Norway

Personal information
- Native name: Тимур Асланович Бижоев
- Full name: Timur Aslanovich Bizhoev
- Born: 22 March 1996 (age 30) Nartkala, Kabardino-Balkaria, Russia
- Height: 172 cm (5 ft 8 in)

Sport
- Country: Russia
- Sport: Amateur wrestling
- Weight class: 74 kg
- Event: Freestyle

Achievements and titles
- World finals: (bronze) (2021)
- Regional finals: (bronze) (2019)
Medal record
Men's freestyle wrestling
Representing UWW
European Championships
Bronze medal – third place	2026 Tirana	74 kg
Representing Russian Wrestling Federation
World Championships
Bronze medal – third place	2021 Oslo	74 kg
Representing Russia
World Cup
Gold medal – first place	2019 Yakutsk	74 kg
European Championships
Bronze medal – third place	2019 Bucharest	74 kg
World Military Championships
Bronze medal – third place	2023 Baku	74 kg
World U23 Championships
Bronze medal – third place	2018 Bucharest	74 kg
World Cadets Championships
Bronze medal – third place	2013 Zrenjanin	74 kg
Representing Kabardino-Balkaria
Golden Grand Prix Ivan Yarygin
Gold medal – first place	2026 Krasnoyarsk	74 kg
Silver medal – second place	2023 Krasnoyarsk	74 kg
Bronze medal – third place	2022 Krasnoyarsk	74 kg
Bronze medal – third place	2025 Krasnoyarsk	74 kg
Alany Tournament
Gold medal – first place	2018 Vladikavkas	74 kg
Bronze medal – third place	2017 Vladikavkas	74 kg
Bronze medal – third place	2019 Vladikavkas	74 kg
Russian National Championships
Silver medal – second place	2023 Kaspiysk	74 kg
Bronze medal – third place	2020 Naro-Fominsk	74 kg
Bronze medal – third place	2019 Sochi	74 kg
All-Russian Spartakiad
Bronze medal – third place	2022 Kazan	74 kg

Timur Bizhoev (Russian: Тимур Асланович Бижоев; born 22 March 1996) is a Russian freestyle wrestler. He is a bronze medalist in the men's 74 kg event at both the 2019 European Wrestling Championships held in Bucharest, Romania and the 2021 World Wrestling Championships held in Oslo, Norway.

== Career ==
He won one of the bronze medals in the 74 kg event at the 2019 European Wrestling Championships held in Bucharest, Romania. A year earlier, he also won one of the bronze medals in this event at the 2018 U23 World Wrestling Championships, also held in Bucharest, Romania.

In 2020, he won one of the bronze medals in the men's 74 kg event at the Russian National Freestyle Wrestling Championships.

== Achievements ==
Year	Tournament	Location	Result	Event
2019	European Championships	Bucharest, Romania	3rd	Freestyle 74 kg
2021	World Championships	Oslo, Norway	3rd	Freestyle 74 kg
