= Radik Valiev =

Russian freestyle wrestler

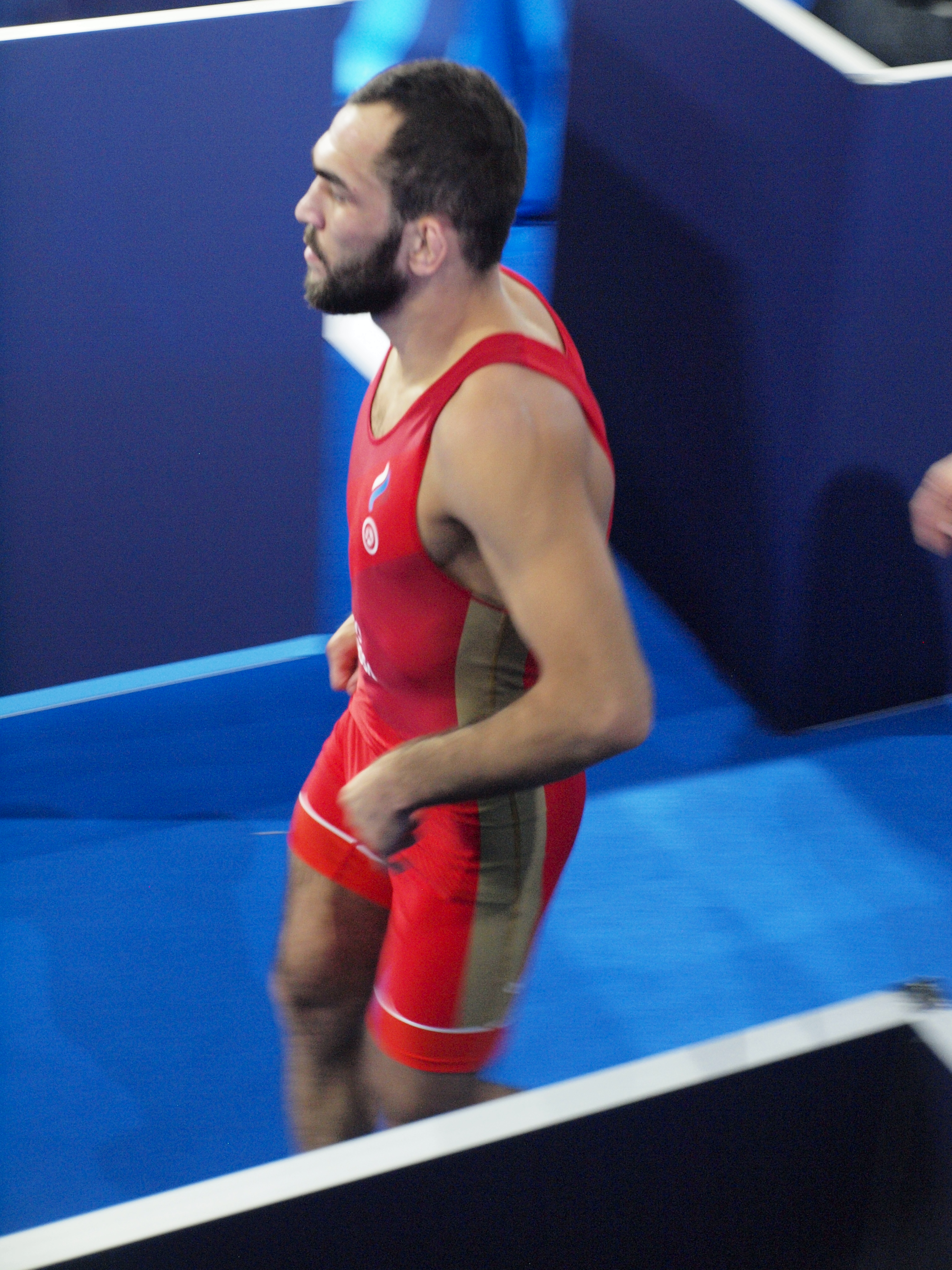
- Radik Valiev at the 2021 World Wrestling Championships in Oslo, Norway

Personal information
- Native name: Радик Юрьевич Валиев
- Full name: Radik Yurievich Valiev
- Born: 18 June 1997 (age 29) Vladikavkas, North Ossetia–Alania, Russia
- Height: 174 cm (5 ft 9 in)

Sport
- Country: Russia
- Sport: Amateur wrestling
- Weight class: 79 kg
- Event: Freestyle
- Club: CSKA Vladikavkaz/Wrestling Academy of Aslan Khadartsev
Medal record
Men's freestyle wrestling
Representing Russian Wrestling Federation
World Championships
Bronze medal – third place	2021 Oslo	79 kg
Representing Russia
World Cup
Silver medal – second place	2016 Los Angeles	70 kg
World U23 Championships
Bronze medal – third place	2019 Budapest	79 kg
European U23 Championship
Gold medal – first place	2018 Istanbul	79 kg
Gold medal – first place	2019 Novi Sad	79 kg
Representing (North Ossetia–Alania) North Ossetia
Russian National Championships
Silver medal – second place	2016 Yakutsk	70 kg
Bronze medal – third place	2022 Kyzyl	79 kg
Bronze medal – third place	2021 Ulan-Ude	79 kg
Golden Grand Prix Ivan Yarygin
Gold medal – first place	2022 Krasnoyarsk	79 kg
Bronze medal – third place	2023 Krasnoyarsk	79 kg
Bronze medal – third place	2018 Krasnoyarsk	79 kg
Bronze medal – third place	2017 Krasnoyarsk	74 kg
Poddubny Wrestling League
Silver medal – second place	2022 Moscow	79 kg

Radik Valiev (Russian: Радик Юрьевич Валиев, Iron Ossetic: Уалыты Юрийы фырт Чермен; born 18 June 1997) is a Russian freestyle wrestler. Valiev won one of the bronze medals in the men's 79 kg event at the 2021 World Wrestling Championships held in Oslo, Norway. In 2022, Valiev won a gold medal at the annually held prestigious tournament, the Ivan Yarygin Golden Gran Prix, held in Krasnoyarsk, Russia.
