= Khetag Tsabolov =

Russian freestyle wrestler

Khetag Nikolayevich Tsabolov Хетаг Николаевич Цаболов
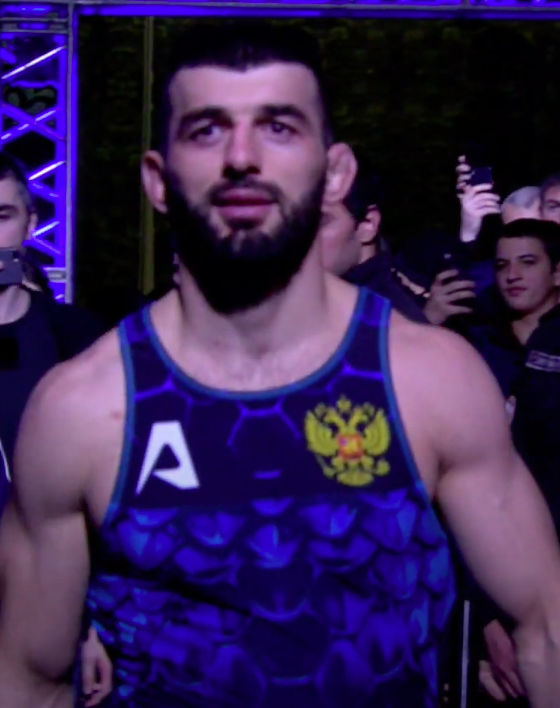
- Tsabolov before competing against James Green at the 2019 Alans International

Personal information
- Nickname: The Ankle Lace Machine
- Nationality: Russian; Serbian
- Born: November 17, 1991 (age 34) Vladikavkaz, North Ossetia–Alania, Russia, Soviet Union
- Height: 1.73 m (5 ft 8 in)
- Weight: 70 kg (154 lb)

Sport
- Country: Russia (2001–2021); Serbia (2021–present)
- Sport: Freestyle wrestling
- Club: Rvački klub Partizan
- Coached by: Tsabolov Timur
Medal record
Representing Serbia
World Championships
Bronze medal – third place	2023 Belgrade	74 kg
European Championships
Bronze medal – third place	2023 Zagreb	79 kg
Representing Russia
World Championships
Gold medal – first place	2014 Tashkent	70 kg
Silver medal – second place	2017 Paris	74 kg
World Cup
Silver medal – second place	2014 Los Angeles	70 kg
Golden Grand Prix Ivan Yarygin
Gold medal – first place	2018 Krasnoyarsk	74 kg
Bronze medal – third place	2014 Krasnoyarsk	74 kg
Silver medal – second place	2012 Krasnoyarsk	66 kg
Russian Nationals
Silver medal – second place	2020 Naro-Fominsk	74 kg
Silver medal – second place	2019 Sochi	74 kg
Silver medal – second place	2018 Odintsovo	74 kg
Gold medal – first place	2017 Nazran	74 kg
Gold medal – first place	2014 Yakutsk	70 kg
Military World Games
Gold medal – first place	2019 Wuhan	74 kg
Gold medal – first place	2015 Mungyeong	74 kg
Military World Championships
Gold medal – first place	2018 Moscow	79 kg
Gold medal – first place	2017 Klaipeda	74 kg
Gold medal – first place	2016 Skopje	74 kg
Junior World Championships
Gold medal – first place	2011 Bucharest	66 kg

Khetag Nikolayevich Tsabolov (Russian: Хетаг Николаевич Цаболов, Iron Ossetic: Цæболты Николайы фырт Хетæг; born 17 November 1991), also known as Khetik Tsabolov (Serbian: Хетик Цаболов, romanized: Hetik Cabolov), is a Russian and Serbian freestyle wrestler who competes at 74 kilograms. After competing for Russia throughout his career, Tsabolov transferred to Serbia in February 2021, and has since represented the latter. An accomplished athlete, he won the World Championship and the Russian Nationals in 2014 (70 kg), and claimed a World Championship silver medal after winning Russian Nationals in 2017. In February 2016, Khetag became the Alexander Medved Grand Prix champion in Belarus, where he pinned the future 2016 Olympic champion Hassan Yazdani in the final round (74 kg).

He was also the 2018 Ivan Yarygin Grand Prix champion (medalist in 2012 and 2014), a three-time Russian National runner-up (2018, 2019 and 2020), and a two-time Military World Games champion (2015 and 2019). A three-time Military World Champion, Tsabolov was also a '11 Junior World Champion.

He competed in the 74 kg event at the 2022 World Wrestling Championships held in Belgrade, Serbia. He won a bronze medal & thus qualified for the 2024 Summer Olympics.
