= Bekzod Abdurakhmonov =

Uzbekistani wrestler (born 1990)

Bekzod Abdurakhmonov Бекзод Абдурахмонов
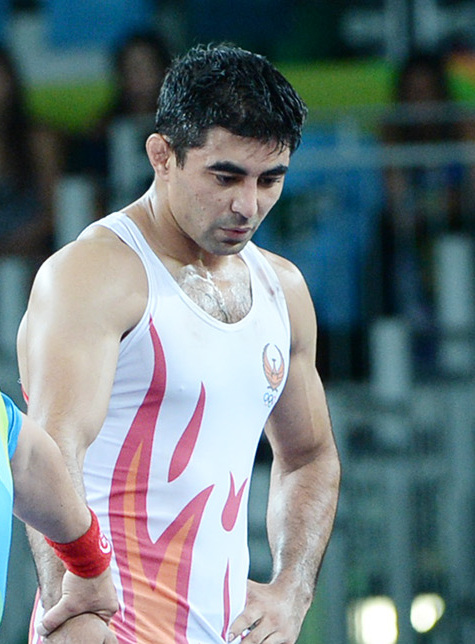
- Abdurakhmonov at the 2016 Summer Olympics
- Born: 15 March 1990 (age 36); Tashkent, Uzbek ASSR, Soviet Union (now Uzbekistan)
- Other names: The Uzbek Assassin
- Nationality: Uzbekistan
- Height: 5 ft 10 in (178 cm)
- Weight: 74 kg (163 lb; 11 st 9 lb)
- Division: Lightweight
- Reach: 70.0 in (178 cm)
- Fighting out of: Tashkent, Uzbekistan; Boston, Massachusetts
- Team: Team Sityodtong; Team Nowhere
- Rank: International Master of Sports in Wrestling
- Wrestling: Freestyle Wrestling
- Years active: 2013–present

Mixed martial arts record
- Total: 7
- Wins: 7
- By knockout: 3
- By submission: 3
- By decision: 1
- Losses: 0

Other information
- University: Clarion
- Spouse: Nigora Tursunkulova (m. 2021)
- Notable club: Nittany Lion Wrestling Club
- Mixed martial arts record from Sherdog

Bekzod Makhamadzhonovich Abdurakhmonov (Russian: Бекзод Махамаджонович Абдурахмонов; born 15 March 1990) is an Uzbekistani freestyle wrestler and mixed martial artist.

In collegiate wrestling, he was an All-American for Clarion University, and is a member of the Clarion University Sports Hall of Fame.

In freestyle wrestling, he was a two-time Asian Games winner (2014, 2018), two-time Asian Wrestling Championships winner (2015, 2017), and bronze medalist in the 2020 Summer Olympics.

He is the current assistant wrestling coach for Harvard University.

== Career ==
=== Collegiate wrestling ===
Born in Tashkent, Abdurakhmonov was kicked off the Uzbekistan junior national team for punching an opponent.

Without a place to train and speaking no English, he moved to America after being accepted to Colby Community College. He then transferred to Clarion University, where was an All-American in 2012.

Abdurakhmonov was inducted into the Colby Community College Alumni Hall of Fame in 2020, and the Clarion University Sports Hall of Fame in 2023.

=== Freestyle wrestling ===
He won the gold medal at the 2014 Asian Games in Men's 70 kg Freestyle wrestling.

At the 2016 Olympics Abdurakhmonov beat former gold medalist Jordan Burroughs of the United States 11–1, but lost in the bronze-medal match to Jabrayil Hasanov of Azerbaijan.

In 2017, he won the gold medal in the men's 74 kg event at the 2017 Asian Wrestling Championships in New Delhi, India. In the finals, he defeated Muslim Evloev of Kyrgyzstan.

He won the bronze medal in the men's 74 kg event at the 2020 Summer Olympics held in Tokyo, Japan.

Abdurakhmonov competed at the 2024 Asian Wrestling Olympic Qualification Tournament in Bishkek, Kyrgyzstan and he earned a quota place for Uzbekistan for the 2024 Summer Olympics in Paris, France.

He lost to Keegan O'Toole at RAF 10 on June 13, 2026 via decision. This fight earned him a Match of the Night award.

=== Coaching ===
Abdurakhmonov has been the assistant wrestling coach for Harvard University since 2014.

== Personal life ==
He is married to Uzbekistani taekwondo athlete Nigora Tursunkulova.

== Mixed martial arts record ==
Professional record breakdown
7 matches	7 wins	0 losses
By knockout	4	0
By submission	3	0

Res.	Record	Opponent	Method	Event	Date	Round	Time	Location	Notes
Win	7–0	Derik de Freitas do Amaral	TKO	Combat FC 4	June 16, 2023	1	N/A	Wilmington, Massachusetts, United States	
Win	6–0	Marcel Goncalves	TKO (punches)	Victory Combat Sports 6	June 6, 2014	1	1:13	Boston, Massachusetts, United States	
Win	5–0	Andrew Osborne	Submission (rear-naked choke)	CES MMA 21	January 24, 2014	1	3:54	Lincoln, Rhode Island, United States	
Win	4–0	Christian Leonard	Submission (arm-triangle choke)	CFFC 29: Smith vs. Kelleher	November 1, 2013	3	2:12	King of Prussia, Pennsylvania, United States	
Win	3–0	Phil Parrish	TKO (punches)	Sherman Cage Rage MMA 3	October 10, 2013	1	4:31	Stroudsburg, Pennsylvania, United States	
Win	2–0	Stephen Singleton	TKO (punches)	Quaker Steak and Lube Fight Night 1	August 10, 2013	1	1:54	Sharon, Pennsylvania, United States	
Win	1–0	Eric Calderon	Submission (rear-naked choke)	Gladiators of the Cage: The North Shore's Rise to Power 2	July 20, 2013	1	1:46	Pittsburgh, Pennsylvania, United States	
