= Tajmuraz Salkazanov =

Slovak freestyle wrestler (born 1996)

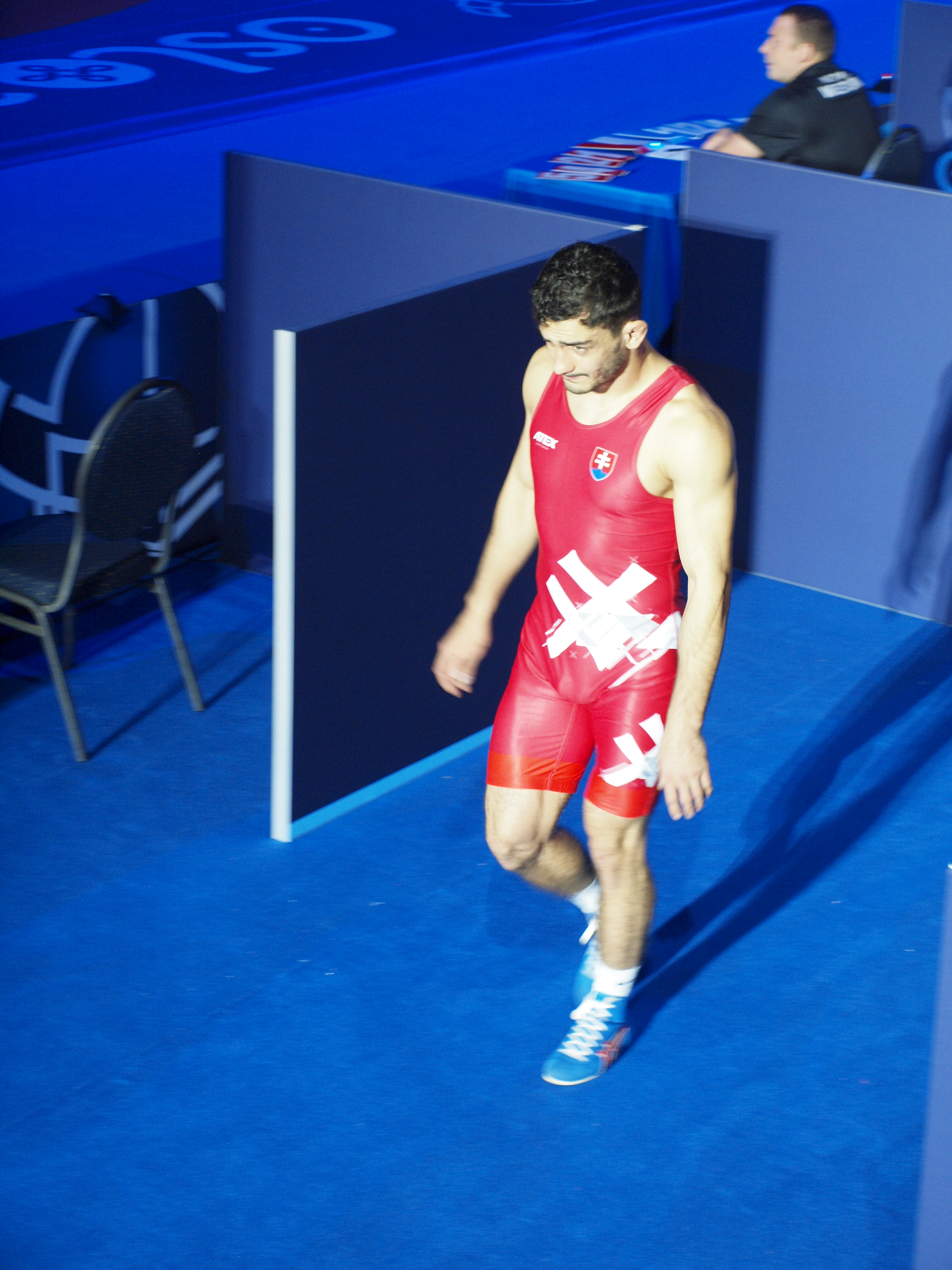
- Tajmuraz Salkazanov at the 2021 World Wrestling Championships in Oslo, Norway

Personal information
- Full name: Taimuraz Mairbekovich Salkazanov
- Nationality: Ossetian
- Born: Салказанов Таймураз Маирбекович; 6 April 1996 (age 30) Karman-Sindzikau, Digorsky District, North Ossetia-Alania, Russia
- Education: North Ossetian State University
- Height: 172 cm (5 ft 8 in)

Sport
- Country: Russia (2014–2015); Slovakia (2018–)
- Sport: Amateur wrestling
- Weight class: 74kg
- Event: Freestyle

Achievements and titles
- World finals: (bronze) (2019) (silver) (2021) (silver) (2022) (bronze) (2025)
- Regional finals: (gold) (2021) (gold) (2022) (gold) (2023) (gold) (2024) (gold) (2026)
Medal record
Men's freestyle wrestling
Representing Slovakia
World Championships
Silver medal – second place	2021 Oslo	74 kg
Silver medal – second place	2022 Belgrade	74 kg
Bronze medal – third place	2019 Nur-Sultan	79 kg
Bronze medal – third place	2025 Zagreb	74 kg
Individual World Cup
Bronze medal – third place	2020 Belgrade	74 kg
European Championships
Gold medal – first place	2021 Warsaw	74 kg
Gold medal – first place	2022 Budapest	74 kg
Gold medal – first place	2023 Zagreb	74 kg
Gold medal – first place	2024 Bucharest	74 kg
Gold medal – first place	2026 Tirana	74 kg
Bronze medal – third place	2025 Bratislava	74 kg
Grand Prix
Gold medal – first place	2022 Almaty	74 kg
Gold medal – first place	2022 Rome	74 kg
Gold medal – first place	2025 Zagreb	74 kg
Silver medal – second place	2025 Tirana	74 kg
Ali Aliyev Tournament
Bronze medal – third place	2018 Kaspisk	70 kg
Yasar Dogu Tournament
Bronze medal – third place	2019 Istanbul	74 kg
Dan Kolov & Nikola Petrov Tournament
Bronze medal – third place	2018 Sofia	70 kg
U23 World Championships
Gold medal – first place	2018 Bucharest	70 kg
Representing All-World Team
World Cup
Bronze medal – third place	2022 Coralville	Team

Tajmuraz Mairbekovich Salkazanov (Russian: Таймураз Маирбекович Салказанов, Iron Ossetic: Салхъазанты Мæирбеджы фырт Таймураз; born 6 April 1996) is a Slovak naturalized freestyle wrestler of Russian origins and Ossetian ethnicity who competes at 74 kilograms. He has represented Slovakia since 2018, and is a five-time European champion at 74 kg.

== Career ==
Salkazanov won the gold medal in the men's 70 kg event at the 2018 U23 World Wrestling Championships held in Bucharest, Romania. In 2019, he won a bronze medal in the men's 79 kg event at the World Wrestling Championships held in Nur-Sultan, Kazakhstan. In 2020, Salkazanov won a bronze medal in the 74 kg event at the Individual Wrestling World Cup held in Belgrade, Serbia.

In March 2021, Salkazanov competed at the European Qualification Tournament in Budapest, Hungary hoping to qualify for the 2020 Summer Olympics in Tokyo, Japan. He did not qualify at this tournament, and he also failed to qualify for the Olympics at the World Olympic Qualification Tournament held in Sofia, Bulgaria.

In April 2021, Salkazanov claimed the 2021 European Championship.

In 2022, Salkazanov won the gold medal in his event at the Matteo Pellicone Ranking Series 2022 held in Rome, Italy. He won the silver medal in the men's 74 kg event at the 2022 World Wrestling Championships held in Belgrade, Serbia.

Salkazanov won the gold medal by defeating Frank Chamizo of Italy 3-1 in the men's freestyle 74 kg final match at the 2023 European Wrestling Championships in Zagreb, Croatia. He reached the final by defeating Rasul Shapiev of Macedonia 5-0 in the second round, Armenian Hrayr Alikhanyan 3-0 in the quarterfinals and Georgian Avtandil Kentchadze 5-1 in the semifinals.

Salkazanov won the gold medal in the men's 74 kg event at the 2024 European Wrestling Championships held in Bucharest, Romania. He defeated Soner Demirtaş of Turkey in his gold medal match. Salkazanov competed at the 2024 European Wrestling Olympic Qualification Tournament in Baku, Azerbaijan hoping to qualify for the 2024 Summer Olympics in Paris, France. He was eliminated in his third match and he did not qualify for the Olympics. Salkazanov later qualified for the Olympics at the 2024 World Wrestling Olympic Qualification Tournament in Istanbul, Turkey. He competed in the men's freestyle 74 kg event at the Olympics.

== Achievements ==
Year	Tournament	Location	Result	Event
2019	World Championships	Nur-Sultan, Kazakhstan	3rd	Freestyle 79 kg
2021	European Championships	Warsaw, Poland	1st	Freestyle 74 kg
2021	World Championships	Oslo, Norway	2nd	Freestyle 74 kg
2022	European Championships	Budapest, Hungary	1st	Freestyle 74 kg
2022	World Championships	Belgrade, Serbia	2nd	Freestyle 74 kg
2023	European Championships	Zagreb, Croatia	1st	Freestyle 74 kg
2024	European Championships	Bucharest, Romania	1st	Freestyle 74 kg
2025	European Championships	Bratislava, Slovakia	3rd	Freestyle 74 kg
2025	World Championships	Zagreb, Croatia	3rd	Freestyle 74 kg

== Freestyle record ==
Senior Freestyle Matches
Res.	Record	Opponent	Score	Date	Event	Location
RAF 06 at 175 lbs.
Win	91–25	(United States) Keegan O'Toole	9–0	28 February 2026	RAF 06	(United States) Tempe, Arizona
RAF 02 at 165 lbs.
Win	90–25	(United States) James Green	4–4	25 October 2025	RAF 02	(United States) State College, Pennsylvania
2025 World Wrestling Championships (bronze) at 74 kg
Win	89–25	(Iran) Younes Emami	3–1	14–15 September 2025	2025 World Wrestling Championships	Zagreb, Croatia
Loss	88–25	(Japan) Kota Takahashi	4–6	14–15 September 2025	2025 World Wrestling Championships	Zagreb, Croatia
Win	88–24	(Bahrain) Magomedrasul Asluev	6–0	14–15 September 2025	2025 World Wrestling Championships	Zagreb, Croatia
Win	87–24	(Venezuela) Anthony Montero	5–0	14–15 September 2025	2025 World Wrestling Championships	Zagreb, Croatia
Win	86–24	(Spain) Mohammad Aliasghar Mottaghinia	5–0	14–15 September 2025	2025 World Wrestling Championships	Zagreb, Croatia
2025 Polyák Imre & Varga János Memorial Tournament 5th at 74 kg
Loss	85–24	(United States) David Carr	4–4	17–20 July 2025	2025 Polyák Imre & Varga János Memorial Tournament	Budapest, Hungary
Win	85–23	(Hungary) Murad Kuramagomedov	5–2	17–20 July 2025	2025 Polyák Imre & Varga János Memorial Tournament	Budapest, Hungary
Loss	84–23	(Japan) Kota Takahashi	6–6	17–20 July 2025	2025 Polyák Imre & Varga János Memorial Tournament	Budapest, Hungary
2025 European Wrestling Championships (bronze) at 74 kg
Win	84–22	(Hungary) Murad Kuramagomedov	3–0	8–9 April 2025	2025 European Wrestling Championships	Bratislava, Slovakia
Win	83–22	(North Macedonia) Rasul Shapiev	4–0	8–9 April 2025	2025 European Wrestling Championships	Bratislava, Slovakia
Loss	82–22	Zaurbek Sidakov	2–4	8–9 April 2025	2025 European Wrestling Championships	Bratislava, Slovakia
2025 Muhamet Malo Tournament (silver) at 74 kg
Loss	82–21	(Albania) Chermen Valiev	0–2	26 February–2 March 2025	2025 Muhamet Malo Tournament	Tirana, Albania
Win	82–20	Magoma Dibirgadzhiev	5–0	26 February–2 March 2025	2025 Muhamet Malo Tournament	Tirana, Albania
Win	81–20	(Georgia (country)) Georgi Elbakidze	5–0	26 February–2 March 2025	2025 Muhamet Malo Tournament	Tirana, Albania
Win	80–20	(Bulgaria) Ramazan Ramazanov	5–0	26 February–2 March 2025	2025 Muhamet Malo Tournament	Tirana, Albania
Win	79–20	(Hungary) Murad Kuramagomedov	2–1	26 February–2 March 2025	2025 Muhamet Malo Tournament	Tirana, Albania
2025 Grand Prix Zagreb Open (gold) at 74 kg
Win	78–20	(United States) David Carr	4–0	5–9 February 2025	2025 Grand Prix Zagreb Open	Zagreb, Croatia
Win	77–20	(Georgia (country)) Georgi Elbakidze	TF 11–0	5–9 February 2025	2025 Grand Prix Zagreb Open	Zagreb, Croatia
Win	76–20	(Azerbaijan) Aghanazar Novruzov	5–0	5–9 February 2025	2025 Grand Prix Zagreb Open	Zagreb, Croatia
2024 Summer Olympics 10th at 74 kg
Loss	75–20	Mahamedkhabib Kadzimahamedau	6–6	9–10 August 2024	2024 Summer Olympics	Paris, France
Loss	75–19	(Uzbekistan) Razambek Zhamalov	3–11	9–10 August 2024	2024 Summer Olympics	Paris, France
2024 World Wrestling Olympic Qualification Tournament (gold) at 74 kg
Win	75–18	(Turkey) Soner Demirtaş	4–2	9–12 May 2024	2024 World Wrestling Olympic Qualification Tournament	Istanbul, Turkey
Win	74–18	(India) Jaideep Jaideep	3–0	9–12 May 2024	2024 World Wrestling Olympic Qualification Tournament	Istanbul, Turkey
Win	73–18	(Switzerland) Tobias Portmann	TF 10–0	9–12 May 2024	2024 World Wrestling Olympic Qualification Tournament	Istanbul, Turkey
Win	72–18	(Turkmenistan) Arslan Amanmyradov	TF 11–0	9–12 May 2024	2024 World Wrestling Olympic Qualification Tournament	Istanbul, Turkey
2024 European Wrestling Olympic Qualification Tournament 5th at 74 kg
Loss	71–18	Mahamedkhabib Kadzimahamedau	2–4	5–7 April 2024	2024 European Wrestling Olympic Qualification Tournament	Baku, Azerbaijan
Win	71–17	(Bulgaria) Miroslav Kirov	4–3	5–7 April 2024	2024 European Wrestling Olympic Qualification Tournament	Baku, Azerbaijan
Win	70–17	(Ukraine) Vadym Tsurkan	6–0	5–7 April 2024	2024 European Wrestling Olympic Qualification Tournament	Baku, Azerbaijan
2024 European Wrestling Championships (gold) at 74 kg
Win	69–17	(Turkey) Soner Demirtaş	5–0	12–18 February 2024	2024 European Wrestling Championships	Bucharest, Romania
Win	68–17	(Azerbaijan) Turan Bayramov	7–1	12–18 February 2024	2024 European Wrestling Championships	Bucharest, Romania
Win	67–17	(Armenia) Mohammad Mottaghinia	4–1	12–18 February 2024	2024 European Wrestling Championships	Bucharest, Romania
Win	66–17	(Armenia) Hayk Papikyan	2–1	12–18 February 2024	2024 European Wrestling Championships	Bucharest, Romania
PWL: Dagestan vs. North Ossetia
Win	65–17	(Russia) Akhmed Usmanov	4–0	3 November 2023	PWL: Dagestan vs. North Ossetia	Moscow, Russia
2023 World Wrestling Championships DNP at 74 kg
Loss	64–17	(Greece) Georgios Kougioumtsidis	3–4	16–24 September 2023	2023 World Wrestling Championships	Belgrade, Serbia
Win	64–16	(North Macedonia) Rasul Shapiev	4-3	16–24 September 2023	2023 World Wrestling Championships	Belgrade, Serbia
Win	63–16	(Moldova) Vasile Diacon	8–2	16–24 September 2023	2023 World Wrestling Championships	Belgrade, Serbia
2023 European Wrestling Championships (gold) at 74 kg
Win	62–16	(Italy) Frank Chamizo	3-1	19 April 2023	2023 European Championships	Zagreb, Croatia
Win	61–16	(Georgia (country)) Avtandil Kentchadze	5-1	18 April 2023	2023 European Championships	Zagreb, Croatia
Win	60–16	(Armenia) Hrayr Alikhanyan	3-0	18 April 2023	2023 European Championships	Zagreb, Croatia
Win	59–16	(North Macedonia) Rasul Shapiev	5–0	18 April 2023	2023 European Championships	Zagreb, Croatia
Zagreb Grand Prix 2023 DNP at 74kg				18 April 2023		Zagreb, Croatia
Loss	58–16	(Japan) Kojiro Shiga	6-10	1 February 2023	Zagreb Grand Prix 2023	Zagreb, Croatia
Loss	58–15	(Iran) Younes Emami	0-6	1 February 2023	Zagreb Grand Prix 2023	Zagreb, Croatia
Wrestling World Cup (bronze) at 74kg
Win	58–14	(Georgia (country)) Giorgi Sulava	10-0	11 December 2022	Wrestling World Cup	(United States) Coralville, Iowa
Win	57–14	(Iran) Mohammed Firouzpour	9-0	10 December 2022	Wrestling World Cup	(United States) Coralville, Iowa
Win	56-14	(Japan) Kirin Kinoshita	10-0	10 December 2022		(United States) Coralville, Iowa
2022 World Championships (silver) at 74 kg						(United States) Coralville, Iowa
Loss	55–14	(United States) Kyle Dake	1-3	17 September 2022	2022 World Championships	Belgrade, Serbia
Win	55–13	(Italy) Frank Chamizo	3-0	16 September 2022	2022 World Championships	Belgrade, Serbia
Win	54-13	(Turkey) Soner Demirtaş	3-1	16 September 2022	2022 World Championships	Belgrade, Serbia
Win	53–13	(Japan) Daichi Takatani	3-1	16 September 2022	2022 World Championships	Belgrade, Serbia
Win	52–13	(Brazil) Cesar Alvan	13-0	16 September 2022	2022 World Championships	Belgrade, Serbia
Matteo Pellicone 2022 (gold) at 74 kg
Win	51–13	(Azerbaijan) Turan Bayramov	4-0	25 June 2022	Matteo Pellicone 2022	Rome, Italy
Win	50–13	(Turkey) Fazlı Eryılmaz	WO		Matteo Pellicone 2022	Rome, Italy
Win	49–13	(Georgia (country)) Dmitri Jioevi	7-1		Matteo Pellicone 2022	Rome, Italy
Win	48–13	(Azerbaijan) Khadzhimurad Gadzhiyev	3-2		Matteo Pellicone 2022	Rome, Italy
Bolat Turlykhanov Ranking Series 2022 (gold) at 74 kg						Rome, Italy
Win	47–13	(Mongolia) Bat-Erdeniin Byambadorj	8-0	5 June 2022	Bolat Turlykhanov Ranking Series 2022	Almaty, Kazakhstan
Win	46–13	(Kazakhstan) Nurkozha Kaipanov	3-1		Bolat Turlykhanov Ranking Series 2022	Almaty, Kazakhstan
Win	45–13	(Uzbekistan) Ikhtiyor Navruzov	3-0		Bolat Turlykhanov Ranking Series 2022	Almaty, Kazakhstan
2022 European Championships (gold) at 74 kg
Win	44–13	(Italy) Frank Chamizo	7-5	30 March 2022	2022 European Championships	Budapest, Hungary
Win	43–13	(Azerbaijan) Turan Bayramov	8-2	29 March 2022	2022 European Championships	Budapest, Hungary
Win	42–13	(Romania) Zurab Kapraev	12-1	29 March 2022	2022 European Championships	Budapest, Hungary
Win	41–13	(Poland) Kamil Rybicki	5–0	29 March 2022	2022 European Championships	Budapest, Hungary
2021 World Championships (silver) at 74 kg				29 March 2022		Budapest, Hungary
Loss	40–13	(United States) Kyle Dake	3–7	3 October 2021	2021 World Championships	Oslo, Norway
Win	40–12	(Georgia (country)) Avtandil Kentchadze	5–0	2 October 2021	2021 World Championships	Oslo, Norway
Win	39–12	(Russia) Timur Bizhoev	2–2	2 October 2021	2021 World Championships	Oslo, Norway
Win	38–12	(Bulgaria) Ali-Pasha Umarpashaev	3–0	2 October 2021	2021 World Championships	Oslo, Norway
2021 Alexander Medved Prizes (bronze) at 74 kg
Win	37–12	(Belarus) Vitali Ihnatovich	TF 10–0	10–12 September 2021	2021 Alexander Medved Prizes	Minsk, Belarus
Loss	36–12	(Russia) Magoma Dibirgadzhiev	6–8	10–12 September 2021	2021 Alexander Medved Prizes	Minsk, Belarus
Win	36–11	(Russia) Timur Nikolaev	3–0	10–12 September 2021	2021 Alexander Medved Prizes	Minsk, Belarus
2021 World Olympic Qualification Tournament (bronze) at 74 kg
Win	35–11	(Kyrgyzstan) Arsalan Budazhapov	5–2	6–7 May 2021	2021 World Olympic Qualification Tournament	Sofia, Bulgaria
Loss	34–11	(Belarus) Magomedkhabib Kadimagomedov	2–13	6–7 May 2021	2021 World Olympic Qualification Tournament	Sofia, Bulgaria
Win	34–10	(Bulgaria) Ali-Pasha Umarpashaev	6–4	6–7 May 2021	2021 World Olympic Qualification Tournament	Sofia, Bulgaria
Win	33–10	(Romania) Zurab Kapraev	TF 10–0	6–7 May 2021	2021 World Olympic Qualification Tournament	Sofia, Bulgaria
Win	32–10	(Switzerland) Marc Dietsche	TF 12–2	6–7 May 2021	2021 World Olympic Qualification Tournament	Sofia, Bulgaria
2021 European Championships (gold) at 74 kg
Win	31–10	(Bulgaria) Miroslav Kirov	TF 10–0	20–21 April 2021	2021 European Continental Championships	Warsaw, Poland
Win	30–10	(Russia) Razambek Zhamalov	6–5	20–21 April 2021	2021 European Continental Championships	Warsaw, Poland
Win	29–10	(Georgia (country)) Avtandil Kentchadze	6–5	20–21 April 2021	2021 European Continental Championships	Warsaw, Poland
Win	28–10	(Italy) Frank Chamizo	6–2	20–21 April 2021	2021 European Continental Championships	Warsaw, Poland
Win	27–10	(Switzerland) Marc Dietsche	5-2	20–21 April 2021	2021 European Continental Championships	Warsaw, Poland
2021 European Olympic Qualification Tournament 11th at 74 kg
Loss	26–10	(Bulgaria) Ali-Pasha Umarpashaev	Fall	18 March 2021	2021 European Olympic Qualification Tournament	Budapest, Hungary
Win	26–9	(Estonia) Erik Reinbok	8–1	18 March 2021	2021 European Olympic Qualification Tournament	Budapest, Hungary
2020 Individual World Cup (bronze) at 74 kg
Win	25–9	(Hungary) Murad Kuramagomedov	2–2	12–18 December 2020	2020 Individual World Cup	Belgrade, Serbia
Loss	24–9	(Russia) Razambek Zhamalov	0–5	12–18 December 2020	2020 Individual World Cup	Belgrade, Serbia
Win	24–8	(Romania) Maxim Vasilioglo	TF 10–0	12–18 December 2020	2020 Individual World Cup	Belgrade, Serbia
Win	23–8	(Ukraine) Denys Pavlov	7–0	12–18 December 2020	2020 Individual World Cup	Belgrade, Serbia
2019 World Championships (bronze) at 79 kg
Win	22–8	(Kazakhstan) Galymzhan Usserbayev	3–2	21–22 September 2019	2019 World Championships	Nur-Sultan, Kazakhstan
Loss	21–8	(Azerbaijan) Jabrayil Hasanov	3–4	21–22 September 2019	2019 World Championships	Nur-Sultan, Kazakhstan
Win	21–7	(India) Jitender Kumar	4–0	21–22 September 2019	2019 World Championships	Nur-Sultan, Kazakhstan
Win	20–7	(Mongolia) Dorjvaanchigiin Gombodorj	2–1	21–22 September 2019	2019 World Championships	Nur-Sultan, Kazakhstan
Win	19–7	(Tunisia) Ayoub Barraj	7–1	21–22 September 2019	2019 World Championships	Nur-Sultan, Kazakhstan
2019 Yasar Dogu (bronze) at 74 kg
Win	18–7	(Turkey) Yakup Gör	7–5	11–14 July 2019	2019 Yasar Dogu International	Istanbul, Turkey
Win	17–7	(Hungary) Csaba Vida	TF 12–2	11–14 July 2019	2019 Yasar Dogu International	Istanbul, Turkey
Loss	16–7	(United States) Jordan Burroughs	4–6	11–14 July 2019	2019 Yasar Dogu International	Istanbul, Turkey
Win	16–6	(Kazakhstan) Azat Sakayev	TF 10–0	11–14 July 2019	2019 Yasar Dogu International	Istanbul, Turkey
2018 U23 World Championships (gold) at 70 kg
Win	15–6	(Russia) David Baev	9–1	12–18 November 2018	2018 U23 World Championships	Bucharest, Romania
Win	14–6	(Ukraine) Oleksii Boruta	9–0	12–18 November 2018	2018 U23 World Championships	Bucharest, Romania
Win	13–6	(Japan) Jintaro Motoyama	TF 10–0	12–18 November 2018	2018 U23 World Championships	Bucharest, Romania
Win	12–6	(India) Naveen	TF 10–0	12–18 November 2018	2018 U23 World Championships	Bucharest, Romania
2018 World Championships 14th at 70 kg
Loss	11–6	(Georgia (country)) Zurabi Iakobishvili	1–2	22 October 2018	2018 World Championships	Budapest, Hungary
Win	11–5	(Iran) Younes Emami	7–7	22 October 2018	2018 World Championships	Budapest, Hungary
2018 Tbilisi Grand Prix (bronze) at 70 kg
Win	10–5	(Georgia (country)) Konstantin Khabalashvili	4–0	3–5 July 2018	2018 Tbilisi Grand Prix	(Georgia (country)) Tbilisi, Georgia
Loss	9–5	(Georgia (country)) Zurabi Iakobishvili	3–7	3–5 July 2018	2018 Tbilisi Grand Prix	(Georgia (country)) Tbilisi, Georgia
Win	9–4	(Georgia (country)) Giorgi Sulava	TF 11–0	3–5 July 2018	2018 Tbilisi Grand Prix	(Georgia (country)) Tbilisi, Georgia
Win	8–4	(Kazakhstan) Aidyn Tazhigali	TF 14–4	3–5 July 2018	2018 Tbilisi Grand Prix	(Georgia (country)) Tbilisi, Georgia
2018 U23 European Championships 10th at 70 kg
Loss	7–4	(Georgia (country)) Giorgi Sulava	2–2	8 June 2018	2018 U23 European Continental Championships	Istanbul, Turkey
2018 Ali Aliev Memorial (bronze) at 70 kg
Win	7–3	(Russia) Ramazan Ramazanov	TF 10–0	14–18 May 2018	2018 Ali Aliev Memorial	Kaspiysk, Dagestan
Loss	6–3	(Azerbaijan) Khadzhimurad Gadzhiyev	5–6	14–18 May 2018	2018 Ali Aliev Memorial	Kaspiysk, Dagestan
Win	6–2	(Russia) Ildus Giniyatullin	5–2	14–18 May 2018	2018 Ali Aliev Memorial	Kaspiysk, Dagestan
Win	5–2	(Kyrgyzstan) Mansur Syrgak Uulu	8–0	14–18 May 2018	2018 Ali Aliev Memorial	Kaspiysk, Dagestan
2018 European Championships 7th at 70 kg
Loss	4–2	(Georgia (country)) Zurabi Iakobishvili	2–6	4 May 2018	2018 European Continental Championships	Kaspiysk, Dagestan
Win	4–1	(Romania) George Bucur	Fall	4 May 2018	2018 European Continental Championships	Kaspiysk, Dagestan
2018 Dan Kolov - Nikola Petrov (bronze) at 70 kg
Win	3–1	(Turkey) Enes Uslu	4–1	22–25 March 2018	2018 Dan Kolov - Nikola Petrov	Sofia, Bulgaria
Loss	2–1	(Russia) Ilyas Bekbulatov		22–25 March 2018	2018 Dan Kolov - Nikola Petrov	Sofia, Bulgaria
Win	2–0	(Romania) George Bucur		22–25 March 2018	2018 Dan Kolov - Nikola Petrov	Sofia, Bulgaria
Win	1–0	(Georgia (country)) Giorgi Sulava		22–25 March 2018	2018 Dan Kolov - Nikola Petrov	Sofia, Bulgaria
