= 2025 World Wrestling Championships – Men's freestyle 74 kg =

Wrestling competitions

Men's freestyle 74 kg at the 2025 World Championships
- Venue: Arena Zagreb
- Dates: 14–15 September 2025
- Competitors: 35 from 33 nations

Medalists
gold medal	Kota Takahashi	Japan
silver medal	Chermen Valiev	Albania
bronze medal	Zaurbek Sidakov
bronze medal	Tajmuraz Salkazanov	Slovakia

The men's freestyle 74 kilograms is a competition featured at the 2025 World Wrestling Championships, and was held in Zagreb, Croatia on 14 and 15 September 2025.

This freestyle wrestling competition consists of a single-elimination tournament, with a repechage used to determine the winner of two bronze medals. The two finalists face off for gold and silver medals. Each wrestler who loses to one of the two finalists moves into the repechage, culminating in a pair of bronze medal matches, featuring the semifinal losers each facing the remaining repechage opponent from their half of the bracket.

== Results ==
Legend

- R — Retired

=== Final ===
Semifinals		Final
Chermen Valiev (ALB)	6
Zaurbek Sidakov (UWW)	4	Chermen Valiev (ALB)	2^{R}
Kota Takahashi (JPN)	6	Kota Takahashi (JPN)	8
Tajmuraz Salkazanov (SVK)	4

=== Top half ===
==== Section 1 ====
Round of 64
Luca Finizio (ITA)	2
Adam Thomson (CAN)	13

Round of 32
Chermen Valiev (ALB)	12
Erdenebatyn Tögsjargal (MGL)	2
Vikash Kumar (IND)	12
Ibragim Veliev (BEL)	12
Adam Thomson (CAN)	0
Ramazan Ramazanov (BUL)	11
Rasul Shapiev (MKD)	5
David Carr (USA)	9

Round of 16
Chermen Valiev (ALB)	12
Ibragim Veliev (BEL)	2
Ramazan Ramazanov (BUL)	0
David Carr (USA)	10

Quarterfinals
Chermen Valiev (ALB)	7
David Carr (USA)	5

==== Section 2 ====
Round of 64

Round of 32
Murad Kuramagomedov (HUN)	8
Alibek Abdikassymov (KAZ)	1
Vedran Luketin (CRO)	4
Han Dae-gil (KOR)	6
Turan Bayramov (AZE)	1
Zaurbek Sidakov (UWW)	5
Cristian Santiago (MEX)	0
Orozobek Toktomambetov (KGZ)	10

Round of 16
Murad Kuramagomedov (HUN)	7
Han Dae-gil (KOR)	0
Zaurbek Sidakov (UWW)	5
Orozobek Toktomambetov (KGZ)	0

Quarterfinals
Murad Kuramagomedov (HUN)	1
Zaurbek Sidakov (UWW)	5

=== Bottom half ===
==== Section 3 ====
Round of 64
Kota Takahashi (JPN)	10
Han Ok-chol (PRK)	0

Round of 32
Younes Emami (IRI)	6
Hrayr Alikhanyan (ARM)	0
Renato da Silva (BRA)	0
Soner Demirtaş (TUR)	10
Kota Takahashi (JPN)	12
Vitali Ihnatovich (UWW)	0
Mirzo Khayitov (UZB)	1
Giorgi Elbakidze (GEO)	7

Round of 16
Younes Emami (IRI)	3
Soner Demirtaş (TUR)	1
Kota Takahashi (JPN)	10
Giorgi Elbakidze (GEO)	0

Quarterfinals
Younes Emami (IRI)	4
Kota Takahashi (JPN)	11

==== Section 4 ====
Round of 64
Kamil Rybicki (POL)	3
Batuqinggele (CHN)	0

Round of 32
Magomedrasul Asluev (BRN)	11
Ivan Kusyak (UKR)	0
Ion Marcu (MDA)	10
Kamil Rybicki (POL)	0
Anthony Montero (VEN)	11
Egzon Xhoni (KOS)	0
Mohammad Mottaghinia (ESP)	0
Tajmuraz Salkazanov (SVK)	5

Round of 16
Magomedrasul Asluev (BRN)	6
Ion Marcu (MDA)	0
Anthony Montero (VEN)	0
Tajmuraz Salkazanov (SVK)	5

Quarterfinals
Magomedrasul Asluev (BRN)	0
Tajmuraz Salkazanov (SVK)	6

=== Repechage ===
Repechage round 1
Han Ok-chol (PRK)	10
Vitali Ihnatovich (UWW)	0

Repechage round 2
Erdenebatyn Tögsjargal (MGL)	11
Ibragim Veliev (BEL)	4
Han Ok-chol (PRK)	1
Giorgi Elbakidze (GEO)	6

Repechage round 3
Erdenebatyn Tögsjargal (MGL)	0
David Carr (USA)	10
Giorgi Elbakidze (GEO)	1
Younes Emami (IRI)	12

Bronze medals
David Carr (USA)	2
Zaurbek Sidakov (UWW)	2
Younes Emami (IRI)	1
Tajmuraz Salkazanov (SVK)	3

== Final standing ==
Rank	Athlete
1st place, gold medalist(s)	Kota Takahashi (JPN)
2nd place, silver medalist(s)	Chermen Valiev (ALB)
3rd place, bronze medalist(s)	Zaurbek Sidakov (UWW)
3rd place, bronze medalist(s)	Tajmuraz Salkazanov (SVK)
5	David Carr (USA)
5	Younes Emami (IRI)
7	Magomedrasul Asluev (BRN)
8	Murad Kuramagomedov (HUN)
9	Giorgi Elbakidze (GEO)
10	Soner Demirtaş (TUR)
11	Han Ok-chol (PRK)
12	Ibragim Veliev (BEL)
13	Adam Thomson (CAN)
14	Anthony Montero (VEN)
15	Ramazan Ramazanov (BUL)
16	Orozobek Toktomambetov (KGZ)
17	Ion Marcu (MDA)
18	Erdenebatyn Tögsjargal (MGL)
19	Han Dae-gil (KOR)
20	Kamil Rybicki (POL)
21	Vikash Kumar (IND)
22	Rasul Shapiev (MKD)
23	Vedran Luketin (CRO)
24	Luca Finizio (ITA)
25	Turan Bayramov (AZE)
26	Mirzo Khayitov (UZB)
27	Alibek Abdikassymov (KAZ)
28	Batuqinggele (CHN)
29	Mohammad Mottaghinia (ESP)
30	Hrayr Alikhanyan (ARM)
31	Cristian Santiago (MEX)
32	Renato da Silva (BRA)
33	Ivan Kusyak (UKR)
34	Egzon Xhoni (KOS)
35	Vitali Ihnatovich (UWW)
