= David Carr (wrestler) =

American wrestler (born 1999)

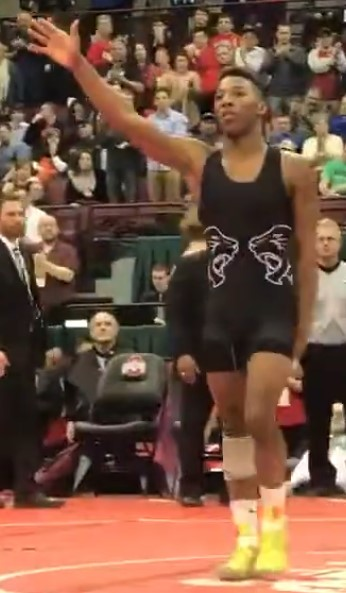
- Carr in 2018

Personal information
- Full name: David Aaron Carr
- Born: March 28, 1999 (age 27) Georgia, U.S.
- Home town: Canton, Ohio, U.S.
- Weight: 74 kg (163 lb)
- Parent: Nate Carr

Sport
- Country: United States
- Sport: Wrestling
- Events: Folkstyle and Freestyle
- College team: Iowa State
- Club: Cyclone Regional Training Center
- Coached by: Kevin Dresser

Achievements and titles
- World finals: 5th (2025)
Medal record
Men's freestyle wrestling
Representing the United States
Grand Prix
Gold medal – first place	2022 Warsaw	74 kg
Gold medal – first place	2024 Taraz	74 kg
Gold medal – first place	2026 Nice	74 kg
Gold medal – first place	2026 Zagreb	74 kg
Silver medal – second place	2025 Zagreb	74 kg
Bronze medal – third place	2025 Budapest	74 kg
U20 World Championships
Gold medal – first place	2019 Tallinn	74 kg
U17 World Championships
Bronze medal – third place	2016 Tbilisi	69 kg
Men's collegiate wrestling
Representing the Iowa State Cyclones
NCAA Division I Championships
Gold medal – first place	2021 St. Louis	157 lb
Gold medal – first place	2024 Kansas City	165 lb
Silver medal – second place	2023 Tulsa	165 lb
Bronze medal – third place	2022 Detroit	157 lb
Big 12 Championships
Gold medal – first place	2020 Tulsa	157 lb
Gold medal – first place	2021 Tulsa	157 lb
Gold medal – first place	2022 Tulsa	157 lb
Gold medal – first place	2023 Tulsa	165 lb
Silver medal – second place	2024 Tulsa	165 lb

David Aaron Carr (born March 28, 1999) is an American freestyle and former folkstyle wrestler who competes at 74 kilograms. In freestyle, Carr is a U20 World Champion and U17 World bronze medalist. Carr represented Team USA at the 2025 World Championships.

In folkstyle, he was a two-time NCAA Division I National champion and three-time finalist, as well as a four-time Big 12 Conference champion out of the Iowa State University. He competed in the Welterweight division of Real American Freestyle (RAF), where he was the former RAF Welterweight Champion.

== Career ==
Born in Georgia but raised in Ohio, Carr started wrestling at an early age, following his father and Olympic bronze medalist Nate Carr's footsteps.

=== High school ===
As an eighth grader, Carr moved to Kentucky and became a KHSAA state champion out of Woodford County High School, before moving back to Ohio. As a freshman in high school, he became a OHSAA state champion out of Dayton Christian High School, before transferring for a final time to Perry High School (Stark County, Ohio), becoming a four-time OHSAA state champion and five-time state champion overall.

Carr also earned a bronze medal at the 2016 U17 World Championships. The top-recruit at his weight class, Carr received the Dave Schultz High School Excellence Award for the class of 2018, in memory of Dave Schultz.

=== University ===
Carr arrived to ISU to wrestle as a Cyclone at 157 pounds after committing in October 2017.

==== 2018-19 ====
While redshirting, Carr compiled a 23–1 record wrestling unattached at open tournaments. He claimed titles at four of the five tournaments he competed in and third place at the tournament in which he lost.

==== 2019-20 ====
Carr had an outstanding freshman season competing as a Cyclone, compiling an 18–1 record overall and an unbeaten 9–0 at dual meets. His lone loss at the Cliff Keen Invitational to second-ranked Ryan Deakin. He became the fifth Cyclone freshman to claim a Big 12 Conference title, with notable wins over the #18 and #7-ranked wrestlers in the country. Carr was scheduled to compete at the NCAA championships as the third seed, however, the event was canceled due to the COVID-19 pandemic. After the season, he was named a first-team NCAA Division I All-American due to his performance through the season.

==== 2020-21 ====
In October 2020, the NCAA granted an extra year of eligibility to winter athletes due to the previous season being cut short. Carr competed as a sophomore, and compiled a 12–0 record with three falls, four technical falls, three majors and two decisions during regular season. He claimed his second straight Big 12 title and his first NCAA championship at 157 pounds.

2021-22

Carr competed at 157 pounds for the Cyclones and compiled a 26-1 record including 13-0 in dual meet competition. He finished with four major decisions, six tech falls and five falls. Carr won his 3rd straight Big 12 title at 157 pounds. He suffered a 2nd round loss at the 2022 NCAA Championships, but wrestled back to a 3rd place finish earning All-American honors for the 3rd consecutive year.

2022-23

Carr moved up to 165 pounds from 157 pounds in 2022. He finished the regular season undefeated with a 10-0 dual record including a win over the returning 165 pound NCAA Champion, U20 and U23 World Champion Keegan O'Toole. Carr won his 4th consecutive Big 12 title with a second win over O'Toole. He finished the year with a 27-1 record including wins over Quincy Monday and former national champion Shane Griffith. Carr lost to Missouri's O'Toole in the NCAA finals, taking a 2nd place trophy back to Ames.

2023-24

In 2024, Carr wrestled his senior season looking to avenge last year's NCAA finals loss. He wrestled to a 27-2 record with a 65% bonus rate. He finished 3rd at the Cliff Keen Invitational and 2nd at the Big 12 Championship. He helped lead the Cyclones to their first Big 12 team title since 2010. Carr entered the 2024 NCAA Championships as a #4 seed, the lowest of his career. He beat the #1 seed O'Toole in the semi finals, taking a 3-2 series lead on O'Toole. In the finals, he beat the #2 seed, U20 World Champion, Mitchell Mesenbrink 9-8 to claim his 2nd National Championship. He finished his collegiate career as a two-time NCAA Champion, four-time Big 12 Champion, and a five-time NCAA All-American with a 125-6 career record.

After the 2023–24 season, Carr was named by the Big 12 as the men's recipient of the Bob Bowlsby Award, described by the conference as its "most prestigious individual accolade." The award, voted on by Big 12 athletic directors, is presented to the men's and women's athletes deemed "the absolute best in the Big 12 for their leadership and excellence, on and off the field of competition."

== Freestyle career ==
=== Cadet & Junior ===
Carr was a standout youth-level freestyle wrestler and his eligibility to compete at this level expired in early 2020. As a cadet, he was a World bronze-medalist, a US National champion and a two-time National finalist. As a junior, he became the 19' World Champion and was also a US Open and Fargo National champion.

=== Senior ===
==== 2019 ====
Carr made his senior debut as an 18-year old at the Dave Schultz Memorial International. He won his first two bouts in a row with a notable win over four-time NCAA Division I All-American Dylan Ness before being thrown to the consolation bracket by the accomplished Olympian Frank Molinaro in a very close 8-9 decision. He then faced another DI All-American in Sammy Sasso, whom he also lost to on points.

Carr then went on to compete at the Granma y Cerro Pelado International. He once again defeated two opponents in a row with a victory over an NCAA Division I All-American in Anthony Collica. He was then defeated by four-time All-American Brandon Sorensen and three-timer Lavion Mayes, but still competed for the bronze-medal against Franklin Maren, whom he defeated to claim the medal.

==== 2020 ====
Carr competed at the US National Championships (where he was the fifth seed) on October 10–11, making his senior debut at 74 kilograms. After a four-match winning streak (including a victory over Dan Hodge Trophy finalist Ryan Deakin), he was defeated three times in a row by the defending US National title holder Logan Massa, three-time All-American and U23 World Team Member Hayden Hidlay and Deakin, respectively, placing sixth.

== Personal life ==
Carr is the son of Olympic medalist and former Iowa State Cyclone Nate Carr. Carr is a Christian.

== Freestyle record ==
Senior Freestyle Matches
Res.	Record	Opponent	Score	Date	Event	Location
2026 US World Team Trials (silver) at 74 kg
Loss	66–20	(United States) James Green	1–4	June 19, 2026	2026 Final X	(United States) Newark, New Jersey
Win	66–19	(United States) James Green	6–5	June 19, 2026	2026 Final X	(United States) Newark, New Jersey
Loss	65–19	(United States) James Green	3–6	June 19, 2026	2026 Final X	(United States) Newark, New Jersey
Win	65–18	(United States) Jayden James	9–7	May 14–15, 2026	2026 US World Team Trials Challenge	(United States) Louisville, Kentucky
Win	64–18	(United States) Evan Wick	6–5	May 14–15, 2026	2026 US World Team Trials Challenge	(United States) Louisville, Kentucky
Win	63–18	(United States) Jarrett Jacques	5–3	May 14–15, 2026	2026 US World Team Trials Challenge	(United States) Louisville, Kentucky
2026 US Open 4th at 74 kg
Loss	62–18	(United States) Joe Sealey	3–5	April 25, 2026	2025 US Open National Championships	(United States) Las Vegas, Nevada
Win		(United States) Quincy Monday	FF	April 25, 2026	2025 US Open National Championships	(United States) Las Vegas, Nevada
Win	62–17	(United States) Will Lewan	8–0	April 25, 2026	2025 US Open National Championships	(United States) Las Vegas, Nevada
Win	61–17	(United States) Bryce Andonian	TF 10–0	April 25, 2026	2025 US Open National Championships	(United States) Las Vegas, Nevada
Loss	60–17	(United States) Cam Amine	3–6	April 25, 2026	2025 US Open National Championships	(United States) Las Vegas, Nevada
Win	60–16	(United States) Ryder Downey	TF 11–0	April 25, 2026	2025 US Open National Championships	(United States) Las Vegas, Nevada
Win	59–16	(United States) Caleb Fish	TF 13–1	April 25, 2026	2025 US Open National Championships	(United States) Las Vegas, Nevada
Win	58-16	(United States) Bubba Jenkins	TF 13-2	February 28, 2026	RAF 06	(United States) Tempe, Arizona
2026 Grand Prix Zagreb Open (gold) at 74 kg
Win	57-16	(Japan) Yoshinosuke Aoyagi	4–1	February 4, 2026	2026 Grand Prix Zagreb Open	Zagreb, Croatia
Win	56-16	(Georgia (country)) Giorgi Elbakidze	TF 12-1	February 4, 2026	2026 Grand Prix Zagreb Open	Zagreb, Croatia
Win	55-16	(United States) Jarrett Jacques	9-2	February 4, 2026	2026 Grand Prix Zagreb Open	Zagreb, Croatia
Win	54-16	(Iran) Ali Akbar Fazli	Fall	February 4, 2026	2026 Grand Prix Zagreb Open	Zagreb, Croatia
2026 Henri Deglane Grand Prix (gold) at 74 kg
Win	53-16	(France) Seyfullah Itaev	5-1	January 10, 2026	2026 Henri Deglane Grand Prix	Nice, France
Win	52-16	(United States) Terrell Barraclough	4-0	January 10, 2026	2026 Henri Deglane Grand Prix	Nice, France
Win	51-16	(Austria) Muhamed Bektemirov	TF 13-2	January 10, 2026	2026 Henri Deglane Grand Prix	Nice, France
Win	50-16	(France) Abdoullah Nakaev	6-2	January 10, 2026	2026 Henri Deglane Grand Prix	Nice, France
Win	49-16	(Palestine) Belal Muhammad	TF 10-0	December 20, 2025	RAF 04	(United States) Fishers, Indiana
Win	48–16	(Egypt) Amr Reda Hussen	18–6	October 25, 2025	RAF 02	(United States) State College, Pennsylvania
2025 World Championships 5th at 74 kg
Loss	47-16	Zaurbek Sidakov	2-2	September 14-15, 2025	2025 World Championships	Zagreb, Croatia
Win	47-15	(Mongolia) Erdenebatyn Tögsjargal	TF 10-0	September 14-15, 2025	2025 World Championships	Zagreb, Croatia
Loss	46-15	(Albania) Chermen Valiev	5-7	September 14-15, 2025	2025 World Championships	Zagreb, Croatia
Win	46-14	(Bulgaria) Ramazan Ramazanov	TF 10-0	September 14-15, 2025	2025 World Championships	Zagreb, Croatia
Win	45-14	(North Macedonia) Rasul Shapiev	9-5	September 14-15, 2025	2025 World Championships	Zagreb, Croatia
2025 Polyák Imre & Varga János Memorial Tournament (bronze) 74 kg
Win	44–14	(Slovakia) Tajmuraz Salkazanov	4–4	Jul 17-18, 2025	2025 Polyák Imre & Varga János Memorial Tournament	Budapest, Hungary
Loss	43–14	(Japan) Kota Takahashi	7–9	Jul 17-18, 2025	2025 Polyák Imre & Varga János Memorial Tournament	Budapest, Hungary
Win	43–13	(Kyrgyzstan) Orozobek Toktomambetov	8–0	Jul 17-18, 2025	2025 Polyák Imre & Varga János Memorial Tournament	Budapest, Hungary
Win	42–13	(Azerbaijan) Turan Bayramov	5–3	Jul 17-18, 2025	2025 Polyák Imre & Varga János Memorial Tournament	Budapest, Hungary
2025 US World Team Trials (gold) at 74 kg
Win	41–13	(United States) Mitchell Mesenbrink	4–4	June 14, 2025	2025 Final X	(United States) Newark, New Jersey
Win	40–13	(United States) Mitchell Mesenbrink	4–3	June 14, 2025	2025 Final X	(United States) Newark, New Jersey
Win	39–13	(United States) Jarrett Jacques	4–0	May 16–17, 2025	2025 US World Team Trials Challenge	(United States) Louisville, Kentucky
Win	38–13	(United States) Terrell Barraclough	6–3	May 16–17, 2025	2025 US World Team Trials Challenge	(United States) Louisville, Kentucky
Win	37–13	(United States) Edward Scott	TF 13–3	May 16–17, 2025	2025 US World Team Trials Challenge	(United States) Louisville, Kentucky
2025 US Open (silver) at 74 kg
Loss	36–13	(United States) Mitchell Mesenbrink	TF 6–16	April 25–26, 2025	2025 US Open National Championships	(United States) Las Vegas, Nevada
Win	36–12	(United States) Jarrett Jacques	TF 11–0	April 25–26, 2025	2025 US Open National Championships	(United States) Las Vegas, Nevada
Win	35–12	(United States) Edward Scott	TF 11–0	April 25–26, 2025	2025 US Open National Championships	(United States) Las Vegas, Nevada
Win	34–12	(United States) Steven Villalobos	TF 10–0	April 25–26, 2025	2025 US Open National Championships	(United States) Las Vegas, Nevada
Win	33–12	(United States) Kanaipon Tapia	TF 10–0	April 25–26, 2025	2025 US Open National Championships	(United States) Las Vegas, Nevada
Win	32–12	(Japan) Daichi Takatani	10–7	February 26, 2025	FloWrestling: Night in America – 76 kg	(United States) Coralville, Iowa
2025 Grand Prix Zagreb Open (silver) at 74 kg
Loss	31–12	(Slovakia) Tajmuraz Salkazanov	0–4	February 5, 2024	2025 Grand Prix Zagreb Open	Zagreb, Croatia
Win	31–11	(Hungary) Murad Kuramagomedov	TF 12–2	February 5, 2024	2025 Grand Prix Zagreb Open	Zagreb, Croatia
Win	30–11	(Poland) Kamil Rybicki	TF 10–0	February 5, 2024	2025 Grand Prix Zagreb Open	Zagreb, Croatia
Win	29–11	(Poland) Szymon Wojtkowski	TF 11–0	February 5, 2024	2025 Grand Prix Zagreb Open	Zagreb, Croatia
2024 D.A. Kunaev International (gold) at 74 kg
Win	28–11	(Kazakhstan) Yegor Anchugin	TF 10–0	December 20, 2024	2024 D.A. Kunaev International	Taraz, Kazakhstan
Win	27–11	(Mongolia) Batbayar Batsukh	TF 11–0	December 20, 2024	2024 D.A. Kunaev International	Taraz, Kazakhstan
Win	26–11	(Uzbekistan) Zafarbek Otakhonov	13–9	December 20, 2024	2024 D.A. Kunaev International	Taraz, Kazakhstan
Win	25–11	(China) Awusayiman Kelan	TF 10–0	December 20, 2024	2024 D.A. Kunaev International	Taraz, Kazakhstan
Win	24–11	(Kyrgyzstan) Omurbek Talaibek Uulu	TF 10–0	December 20, 2024	2024 D.A. Kunaev International	Taraz, Kazakhstan
2024 US World Team Trials (bronze) at 79 kg
Win	23–12	(United States) Levi Haines	8–2	September 14–15, 2024	2024 US World Team Trials	(United States) Lincoln, Nebraska
Win		(United States) Alex Dieringer	FF	September 14–15, 2024	2024 US World Team Trials	(United States) Lincoln, Nebraska
Win	22–12	(United States) Kennedy Monday	8–4	September 14–15, 2024	2024 US World Team Trials	(United States) Lincoln, Nebraska
Win	21–12	(United States) Sam Beckett	TF 12–0	September 14–15, 2024	2024 US World Team Trials	(United States) Lincoln, Nebraska
Loss	20–12	(United States) Keegan O'Toole	4–9	September 14–15, 2024	2024 US World Team Trials	(United States) Lincoln, Nebraska
Win	20–11	(United States) Matt Bianchi	5–1	September 14–15, 2024	2024 US World Team Trials	(United States) Lincoln, Nebraska
2022 U23 World Championships 11th at 74 kg
Loss	19–11	(Georgia (country)) Temuri Beruashvili	3–4	October 2, 2022	2022 U23 World Championships	Pontevedra, Spain
Win	19–10	(Puerto Rico) Sonny Santiago	TF 13–2	October 2, 2022	2022 U23 World Championships	Pontevedra, Spain
2022 Poland Open (gold) at 74 kg
Win	18–10	(Ukraine) Zelimkhan Tohuzov	TF 11–0	July 20, 2022	2022 Poland Open	Warsaw, Poland
Win	17–10	(Georgia (country)) Giorgi Sulava	TF 10–0	July 20, 2022	2022 Poland Open	Warsaw, Poland
Win	16–10	(China) Shengsong Xia	TF 12–1	July 20, 2022	2022 Poland Open	Warsaw, Poland
Win	15–10	(China) Menghejigan Menghejigan	TF 13–2	July 20, 2022	2022 Poland Open	Warsaw, Poland
2022 US World Team Trials (bronze) at 74 kg
Win	14–10	(United States) Joey Lavallee	TF 16–6	June 3, 2022	2022 Final X: Stillwater	(United States) Stillwater, Oklahoma
Win	13–10	(United States) Thomas Gantt	TF 10–0	May 21–22, 2022	2022 US World Team Trials	(United States) Coralville, Iowa
Win	12–10	(United States) Josh Shields	9–4	May 21–22, 2022	2022 US World Team Trials	(United States) Coralville, Iowa
Loss	11–10	(United States) Jason Nolf	Fall	May 21–22, 2022	2022 US World Team Trials	(United States) Coralville, Iowa
Win	11–9	(United States) Collin Purinton	15–6	May 21–22, 2022	2022 US World Team Trials	(United States) Coralville, Iowa
2020 US Olympic Team Trials DNP at 74 kg
Loss	10–9	(United States) Thomas Gantt	1–7	April 2–3, 2021	2020 US Olympic Team Trials	(United States) Fort Worth, Texas
Loss	10–8	(United States) Jason Nolf	TF 0–10	April 2–3, 2021	2020 US Olympic Team Trials	(United States) Fort Worth, Texas
Win	10–7	(United States) Logan Massa	8–0	April 2–3, 2021	2020 US Olympic Team Trials	(United States) Fort Worth, Texas
2020 US Nationals 6th at 74 kg
Loss	9–7	(United States) Ryan Deakin	2–5	October 10–11, 2020	2020 US National Championships	(United States) Coralville, Iowa
Loss	9–6	(United States) Hayden Hidlay	5–10	October 10–11, 2020	2020 US National Championships	(United States) Coralville, Iowa
Loss	9–5	(United States) Logan Massa	0–4	October 10–11, 2020	2020 US National Championships	(United States) Coralville, Iowa
Win	9–4	(United States) Ryan Deakin	6–5	October 10–11, 2020	2020 US National Championships	(United States) Coralville, Iowa
Win	8–4	(United States) Renaldo Rodriguez-Spencer	TF 12–1	October 10–11, 2020	2020 US National Championships	(United States) Coralville, Iowa
Win	7–4	(United States) Jacob Wright	TF 10–0	October 10–11, 2020	2020 US National Championships	(United States) Coralville, Iowa
Win	6–4	(United States) Andy Hurla	TF 10–0	October 10–11, 2020	2020 US National Championships	(United States) Coralville, Iowa
2019 Granma y Cerro Pelado (bronze) at 70 kg
Win	5–4	(Cuba) Franklin Maren		February 15–23, 2019	2019 Granma y Cerro Pelado International	Havana, Cuba
Loss	4–4	(United States) Lavion Mayes		February 15–23, 2019	2019 Granma y Cerro Pelado International	Havana, Cuba
Loss	4–3	(United States) Brandon Sorensen		February 15–23, 2019	2019 Granma y Cerro Pelado International	Havana, Cuba
Win	4–2	(United States) Anthony Collica		February 15–23, 2019	2019 Granma y Cerro Pelado International	Havana, Cuba
Win	3–2	(United States) Justin DeAngelis		February 15–23, 2019	2019 Granma y Cerro Pelado International	Havana, Cuba
2019 Dave Schultz M. International DNP at 70 kg
Loss	2–2	(United States) Sammy Sasso	2–7	January 24–26, 2019	2019 Dave Schultz Memorial International	(United States) Colorado Springs, Colorado
Loss	2–1	(United States) Frank Molinaro	8–9	January 24–26, 2019	2019 Dave Schultz Memorial International	(United States) Colorado Springs, Colorado
Win	2–0	(United States) Dylan Ness	7–1	January 24–26, 2019	2019 Dave Schultz Memorial International	(United States) Colorado Springs, Colorado
Win	1–0	(United States) Justin Deangelis	11–2	January 24–26, 2019	2019 Dave Schultz Memorial International	(United States) Colorado Springs, Colorado
