= 2021 European Wrestling Championships – Men's freestyle 74 kg =

Wrestling competition

The men's freestyle 74 kg is a competition featured at the 2021 European Wrestling Championships, and was held in Warsaw, Poland on April 20 and April 21.

== Medalists ==
Gold	Tajmuraz Salkazanov; Slovakia
Silver	Miroslav Kirov; Bulgaria
Bronze	Mitch Finesilver; Israel
Bronze	Frank Chamizo; Italy

== Results ==
Legend

- F — Won by fall

=== Final ===
Final
Miroslav Kirov (BUL)	0
Tajmuraz Salkazanov (SVK)	10

=== Top half ===
Round of 32

Round of 16
Kamil Rybicki (POL)	3
Zurab Kapraev (ROU)	4
Valentin Borzin (MDA)	2
Simon Marchl (AUT)	1
Davud Alizalau (BLR)	2
Mitch Finesilver (ISR)	8
Miroslav Kirov (BUL)	5
Malik Amine (SMR)	1

Quarterfinals
Zurab Kapraev (ROU)	2
Valentin Borzin (MDA)	3
Mitch Finesilver (ISR)	3
Miroslav Kirov (BUL)	8

Semifinals
Valentin Borzin (MDA)	0
Miroslav Kirov (BUL)	7

=== Bottom half ===
Round of 32
Fazlı Eryılmaz (TUR)	3
Ashraf Ashirov (AZE)	2
Csaba Vida (HUN)	2
Semen Radulov (UKR)	13^{F}
Marc Dietsche (SUI)	2
Tajmuraz Salkazanov (SVK)	5
Frank Chamizo (ITA)	4
Daniel Sartakov (GER)	0
Khetag Tsabolov (SRB)	7
Avtandil Kentchadze (GEO)	10
Aimar Andruse (EST)	14
Charlie Bowling (GBR)	3

Round of 16
Hrayr Alikhanyan (ARM)	0
Razambek Zhamalov (RUS)	10
Fazlı Eryılmaz (TUR)	1
Semen Radulov (UKR)	2
Tajmuraz Salkazanov (SVK)	6
Frank Chamizo (ITA)	2
Avtandil Kentchadze (GEO)	13
Aimar Andruse (EST)	8

Quarterfinals
Razambek Zhamalov (RUS)	11
Semen Radulov (UKR)	1
Tajmuraz Salkazanov (SVK)	6
Avtandil Kentchadze (GEO)	5

Semifinals
Razambek Zhamalov (RUS)	5
Tajmuraz Salkazanov (SVK)	6

=== Repechage ===
Repechage round 1
Marc Dietsche (SUI)	1
Frank Chamizo (ITA)	12

Repechage round 2
Malik Amine (SMR)	3
Mitch Finesilver (ISR)	4
Frank Chamizo (ITA)	8
Avtandil Kentchadze (GEO)	2

Bronze medal match
Mitch Finesilver (ISR)	4
Valentin Borzin (MDA)	0
Frank Chamizo (ITA)	5
Razambek Zhamalov (RUS)	1

== Final standing ==
Rank	Athlete
1st place, gold medalist(s)	Tajmuraz Salkazanov (SVK)
2nd place, silver medalist(s)	Miroslav Kirov (BUL)
3rd place, bronze medalist(s)	Mitch Finesilver (ISR)
3rd place, bronze medalist(s)	Frank Chamizo (ITA)
5	Valentin Borzin (MDA)
5	Razambek Zhamalov (RUS)
7	Semen Radulov (UKR)
8	Avtandil Kentchadze (GEO)
9	Aimar Andruse (EST)
10	Zurab Kapraev (ROU)
11	Fazlı Eryılmaz (TUR)
12	Malik Amine (SMR)
13	Marc Dietsche (SUI)
14	Khetag Tsabolov (SRB)
15	Kamil Rybicki (POL)
16	Charlie Bowling (GBR)
17	Ashraf Ashirov (AZE)
18	Davud Alizalau (BLR)
19	Simon Marchl (AUT)
20	Csaba Vida (HUN)
21	Daniel Sartakov (GER)
22	Hrayr Alikhanyan (ARM)
