= 2021 U23 World Wrestling Championships – Men's freestyle 74 kg =

Wrestling Championship

The men's freestyle 74 kilograms is a competition featured at the 2021 U23 World Wrestling Championships, and was held in Belgrade, Serbia on 6 and 7 November.

== Medalists ==
Gold	Chermen Valiev (RUS)
Silver	Mohammad Sadegh Firouzpour (IRI)
Bronze	Temuri Beruashvili (GEO)
Bronze	Hrayr Alikhanyan (ARM)

== Results ==
Legend

- F — Won by fall
- WO — Won by walkover

=== Final ===
Final
Chermen Valiev (RUS)	7
Mohammad Sadegh Firouzpour (IRI)	6

=== Top half ===
Round of 32
Peyton Robb (USA)	10
Hassan Alharthi (KSA)	0
Vasile Diacon (MDA)	WO
~~Sheku Kassegbama (SLE)~~
Chermen Valiev (RUS)	11
Tino Rettinger (GER)	0
Vadym Kurylenko (UKR)	0
Turan Bayramov (AZE)	6

Round of 16
İsa Demir (TUR)	4
Nikolay Dimitrov (BUL)	0
Jacopo Masotti (ITA)	0
Temuri Beruashvili (GEO)	11
Peyton Robb (USA)	4
Vasile Diacon (MDA)	6
Chermen Valiev (RUS)	8
Turan Bayramov (AZE)	3

Quarterfinals
İsa Demir (TUR)	5
Temuri Beruashvili (GEO)	13
Vasile Diacon (MDA)	0
Chermen Valiev (RUS)	9

Semifinals
Temuri Beruashvili (GEO)	0
Chermen Valiev (RUS)	6

=== Bottom half ===
Round of 32
Caetano António Sá (GBS)	1
Parveen Malik (IND)	12
Szymon Wojtkowski (POL)	0
Mohammad Sadegh Firouzpour (IRI)	10
Naftali Horowitz (ISR)	5
Serhan Shakirov (MKD)	15
Simon Marchl (AUT)	WO
~~Rabii Regani (MAR)~~
Krisztian Biro (ROU)	10
Jonathan Parrilla (PUR)	0
Asomiddin Hasanov (UZB)	11
Devan Larkin (CAN)	0
Davud Alizalau (BLR)	0
Nurkozha Kaipanov (KAZ)	8
~~Mathayo Mahabila (KEN)~~
Hrayr Alikhanyan (ARM)	WO

Round of 16
Parveen Malik (IND)	2
Mohammad Sadegh Firouzpour (IRI)	10
Serhan Shakirov (MKD)	0
Simon Marchl (AUT)	10
Krisztian Biro (ROU)	5
Asomiddin Hasanov (UZB)	11
Nurkozha Kaipanov (KAZ)	6
Hrayr Alikhanyan (ARM)	6

Quarterfinals
Mohammad Sadegh Firouzpour (IRI)	14
Simon Marchl (AUT)	6
Asomiddin Hasanov (UZB)	0
Hrayr Alikhanyan (ARM)	10^{F}

Semifinals
Mohammad Sadegh Firouzpour (IRI)	4
Hrayr Alikhanyan (ARM)	2

=== Repechage ===
Repechage round 1
Tino Rettinger (GER)	0
Turan Bayramov (AZE)	7
Szymon Wojtkowski (POL)	18
Parveen Malik (IND)	8

Repechage round 2
Turan Bayramov (AZE)	5
Vasile Diacon (MDA)	6
Szymon Wojtkowski (POL)	0
Simon Marchl (AUT)	4

Bronze medals
Vasile Diacon (MDA)	3
Temuri Beruashvili (GEO)	3
Simon Marchl (AUT)	0
Hrayr Alikhanyan (ARM)	10
