= Wrestling at the 2019 European Games – Men's freestyle 74 kg =

Men's freestyle 74 kg at the 2019 European Games
- Venue: Minsk Sports Palace
- Date: 25 June and 26 June
- Competitors: 14 from 14 nations

Medalists
gold medal	Zaurbek Sidakov	Russia
silver medal	Soner Demirtaş	Turkey
bronze medal	Avtandil Kentchadze	Georgia
bronze medal	Khadzhimurad Gadzhiyev	Azerbaijan

The men's freestyle 74 kilograms wrestling competition at the 2019 European Games in Minsk was held on 25 to 26 June 2019 at the Minsk Sports Palace.

== Schedule ==
All times are in FET (UTC+03:00)

Date	Time	Event
Tuesday, 25 June 2019	11:20	1/8 finals
Tuesday, 25 June 2019	13:00	Quarterfinals
Tuesday, 25 June 2019	18:20	Semifinals
Wednesday, 26 June 2019	11:00	Repechage
Wednesday, 26 June 2019	19:00	Finals

== Results ==
Legend

- F — Won by fall
- R — Retired

=== Main bracket ===
1/8 finals
Magomedmurad Gadzhiev (POL)	2
Miroslav Kirov (BUL)	0
Simon Marchl (AUT)	0
Azamat Nurykau (BLR)	11
Kyrillos Binenmpaoum (GRE)	8
Aimar Andruse (EST)	6
Soner Demirtaş (TUR)	4
Khadzhimurad Gadzhiyev (AZE)	3
Maxim Vasilioglo (ROU)	11
Kubilay Cakici (GER)	6
Achsarbek Gulajev (SVK)	2
Vasyl Mykhailov (UKR)	3

Quarterfinals
Avtandil Kentchadze (GEO)	3
Zaurbek Sidakov (RUS)	5
Magomedmurad Gadzhiev (POL)	3^{R}
Azamat Nurykau (BLR)	4
Kyrillos Binenmpaoum (GRE)	4
Soner Demirtaş (TUR)	15
Maxim Vasilioglo (ROU)	2
Vasyl Mykhailov (UKR)	2

Semifinals
Zaurbek Sidakov (RUS)	6
Azamat Nurykau (BLR)	4
Soner Demirtaş (TUR)	5
Vasyl Mykhailov (UKR)	2

Final
Zaurbek Sidakov (RUS)	4^{F}
Soner Demirtaş (TUR)	0

=== Repechage ===
Repechage round 1
Khadzhimurad Gadzhiyev (AZE)	10
Kyrillos Binenmpaoum (GRE)	3

Bronze medals
Avtandil Kentchadze (GEO)	8
Azamat Nurykau (BLR)	5
Khadzhimurad Gadzhiyev (AZE)	9
Vasyl Mykhailov (UKR)	1
