= Wrestling at the 2024 Summer Olympics – Men's freestyle 74 kg =

Men's freestyle 74 kg at the Games of the XXXIII Olympiad
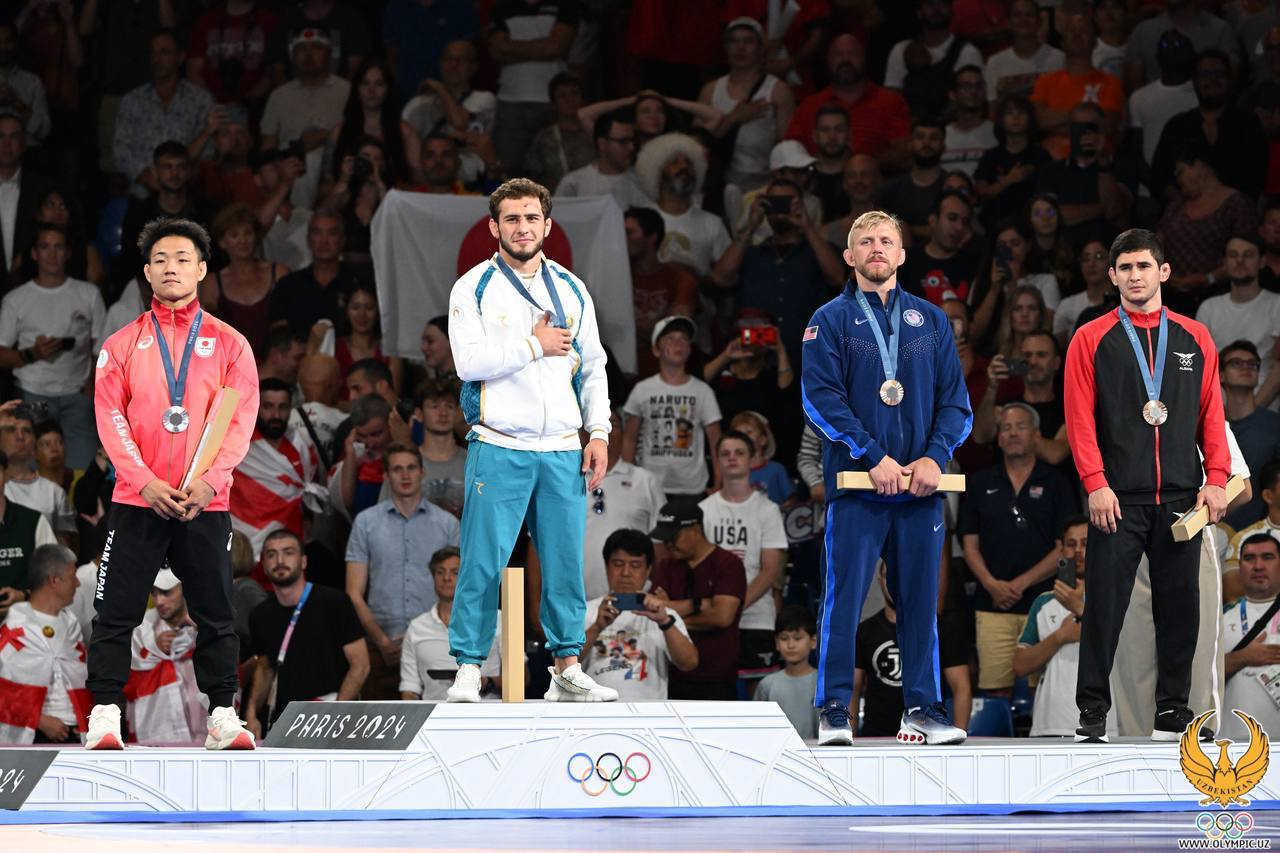
- Medalists Daichi Takatani, Razambek Zhamalov, Kyle Dake, and Chermen Valiev stand on the podium at the award ceremony
- Venue: Grand Palais Éphémère
- Date: 9–10 August 2024
- Competitors: 18 from 18 nations

Medalists
1st place, gold medalist(s)		Razambek Zhamalov	Uzbekistan
2nd place, silver medalist(s)		Daichi Takatani	Japan
3rd place, bronze medalist(s)		Kyle Dake	United States
3rd place, bronze medalist(s)		Chermen Valiev	Albania

Men's freestyle 74 kilograms competition at the 2024 Summer Olympics in Paris, France, took place on 9–10 August 2024 at the Grand Palais Éphémère in Champ de Mars.

== Background ==
This is the 25th appearance of men's freestyle welterweight category, debut as a demonstration in 1904 as 71.7kg, except for 1908-1920, and it has been appeared in every games since them.

- 1904: 71.7kg
- 1924-1936: 72kg
- 1948-1960: 73kg
- 1964-1968: 78kg
- 1972-1996: 74kg
- 2000: 76kg
- 2004-current: 74kg

Razambek Zhamalov won the event by defeating Daichi Takatani in the final, returned bronze medalist Kyle Dake and Chermen Valiev won the bronze medals with Valiev going through repechage round two.

== Format ==
This freestyle wrestling competition consists of a single-elimination tournament, with a repechage used to determine the winner of two bronze medals. The two finalists face off for gold and silver medals. Each wrestler who loses to one of the two finalists moves into the repechage, culminating in a pair of bronze medal matches featuring the semifinal losers each facing the remaining repechage opponent from their half of the bracket.

== Rules ==
A typical bout consists of two halves of three minutes each separated by a 30-second break. The two competitors compete on a mat, which is nine meters in diameter. Wrestlers try to score points by executing various legal maneuvers. Points ranging from one to five are awarded by the mat referee depending on the degree of difficulty of the maneuvers. Points are also awarded to the opponent in case of infractions such as illegal holds, passivity etc. A wrestler is automatically disqualified if three cautions are awarded during a bout. Forcing an opponent's shoulders to the mat results in an instant victory by fall.

During the course of a match, if a wrestler builds a 10-point advantage over the opponent, the bout is stopped and the leader is declared as the winner by technical superiority. The total scores are totaled at the end of the stipulated six-minute period, and the wrestler with the maximum points wins. In case of a tie, the wrestler who has scored the last point is declared the winner. A competitor might also be declared a winner if the opponent does not turn up or is medically unfit to compete.

== Qualification ==
Sixteen quota places were available with each nation restricted to a maximum of one spot. Five quota places were awarded at the 2023 World Wrestling Championships, which took place from the 16th to 24th of September in Belgrade, Serbia. The finalists of each category in the four continental qualification tournaments (Asia, Europe, the Americas, and the joint Africa & Oceania) were awarded quota places. The remainder of the total quota was allocated at the 2024 World Wrestling Olympic Qualification Tournament, offering a minimum of three quota places.

== Schedule ==
All times are Central European Time (UTC+02:00)

Date	Time	Event
9 August 2024	11:30	Qualification rounds
9 August 2024	18:15	Semifinals
10 August 2024	11:00	Repechage
10 August 2024	19:30	Finals

== Results ==
Sixteen athletes qualified for the competition and one additional entry was given for the Refugee Olympic Team.

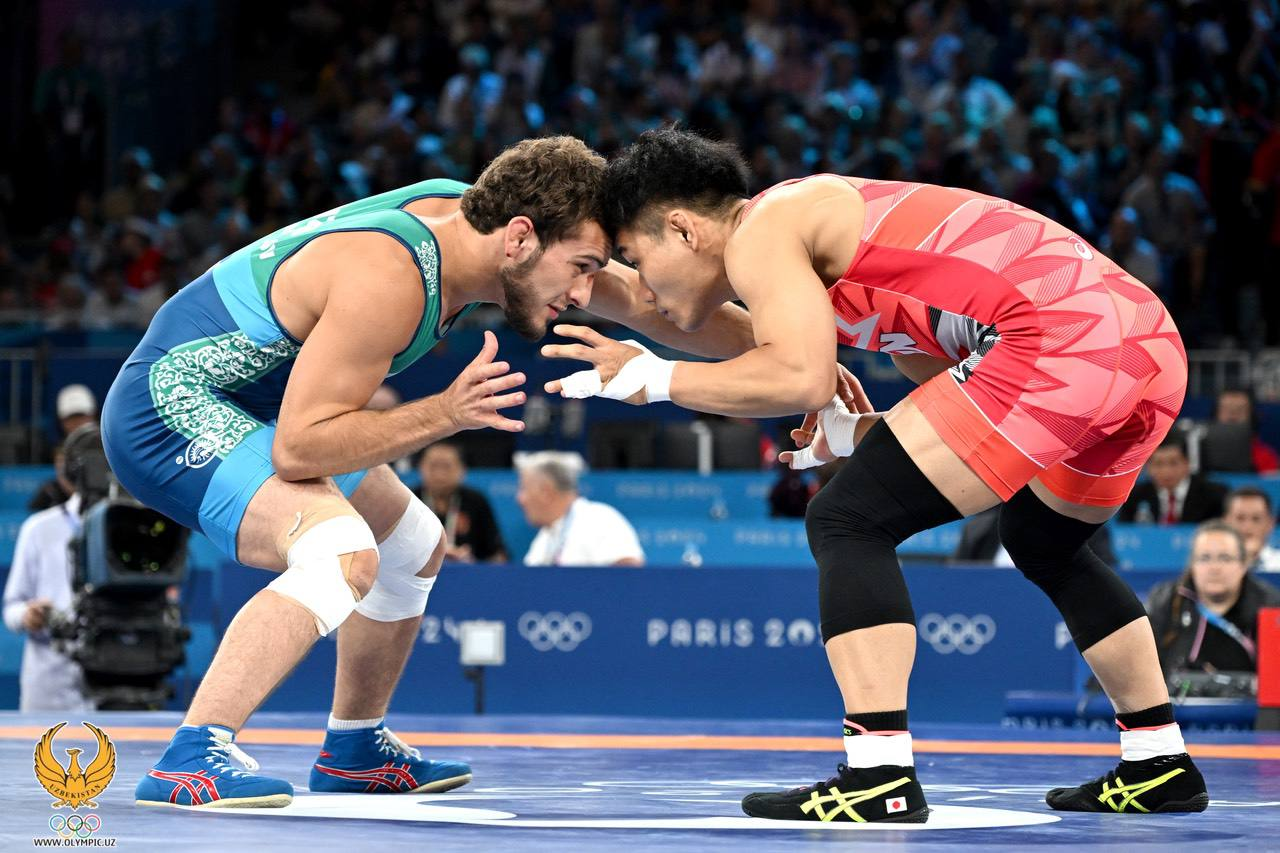
During the final match

Legend

- F — Won by fall
- WO — Won by walkover

=== Final ===
Final
Daichi Takatani (JPN)	0
Razambek Zhamalov (UZB)	5^{F}

=== Top Half ===
Round of 32
Frank Chamizo (ITA)	4
Younes Emami (IRI)	9

Round of 16
Kyle Dake (USA)	10
Anthony Montero (VEN)	0
Younes Emami (IRI)	10
Bacar Ndum (GBS)	0
Khetag Tsabolov (SRB)	10
Iman Mahdavi (EOR)	0
Geandry Garzón (CUB)	0
Daichi Takatani (JPN)	10

Quarterfinals
Kyle Dake (USA)	11^{F}
Younes Emami (IRI)	1
Khetag Tsabolov (SRB)	0
Daichi Takatani (JPN)	10

Semifinals
Kyle Dake (USA)	12
Daichi Takatani (JPN)	20

=== Bottom Half ===
Round of 32
Razambek Zhamalov (UZB)	8
Mahamedkhabib Kadzimahamedau (AIN)	0

Round of 16
Georgios Kougioumtsidis (GRE)	2
Viktor Rassadin (TJK)	8
Amr Reda Hussen (EGY)	4
Lu Feng (CHN)	14
Tajmuraz Salkazanov (SVK)	3
Razambek Zhamalov (UZB)	11
Chermen Valiev (ALB)	4
Turan Bayramov (AZE)	3

Quarterfinals
Viktor Rassadin (TJK)	7
Lu Feng (CHN)	4
Razambek Zhamalov (UZB)	6
Chermen Valiev (ALB)	5

Semifinals
Viktor Rassadin (TJK)	2
Razambek Zhamalov (UZB)	8

=== Repechage ===
Repechage round 1
Mahamedkhabib Kadzimahamedau (AIN)	6
Tajmuraz Salkazanov (SVK)	6

Repechage round 2
Geandry Garzón (CUB)
Khetag Tsabolov (SRB)	WO
Mahamedkhabib Kadzimahamedau (AIN)	2
Chermen Valiev (ALB)	12

Bronze medal matches
Khetag Tsabolov (SRB)	4
Kyle Dake (USA)	10
Chermen Valiev (ALB)	6
Viktor Rassadin (TJK)	2

== Final standing ==
Rank	Athlete
1st place, gold medalist(s)	Razambek Zhamalov (UZB)
2nd place, silver medalist(s)	Daichi Takatani (JPN)
3rd place, bronze medalist(s)	Kyle Dake (USA)
3rd place, bronze medalist(s)	Chermen Valiev (ALB)
5	Khetag Tsabolov (SRB)
5	Viktor Rassadin (TJK)
7	Younes Emami (IRI)
8	Lu Feng (CHN)
9	Mahamedkhabib Kadzimahamedau (AIN)
10	Tajmuraz Salkazanov (SVK)
11	Frank Chamizo (ITA)
12	Amr Reda Hussen (EGY)
13	Turan Bayramov (AZE)
14	Georgios Kougioumtsidis (GRE)
15	Bacar Ndum (GBS)
16	Anthony Montero (VEN)
17	Iman Mahdavi (EOR)
LFO	Geandry Garzón (CUB)
