= 2025 European Wrestling Championships – Men's freestyle 74 kg =

Wrestling competition

Men's freestyle 74 kg at the 2025 European Wrestling Championships
- Venue: X-Bionic Sphere
- Location: Bratislava, Slovakia
- Dates: 8-9 April
- Competitors: 14

Medalists
gold medal	Chermen Valiev	Albania
silver medal	Zaurbek Sidakov
bronze medal	Aghanazar Novruzov	Azerbaijan
bronze medal	Tajmuraz Salkazanov	Slovakia

The men's freestyle 74 kg is a competition featured at the 2025 European Wrestling Championships, and was held in Bratislava, Slovakia on April 8 and 9.

== Results ==
Legend

- F — Won by fall

Round of 16
Ion Marcu (MDA)	3
Ramazan Ramazanov (BUL)	14
Yahor Akulich (UWW)	0
Aghanazar Novruzov (AZE)	10
Ivan Kusyak (UKR)	1
Giorgi Elbakidze (GEO)	7
Murad Kuramagomedov (HUN)	5
Narek Harutyunyan (ARM)	1
Fazlı Eryılmaz (TUR)	8
Kamil Rybicki (POL)	2
Zaurbek Sidakov (UWW)	11
Rasul Shapiev (MKD)	0

Quarterfinals
Chermen Valiev (ALB)	10
Ramazan Ramazanov (BUL)	0
Aghanazar Novruzov (AZE)	5
Giorgi Elbakidze (GEO)	3
Murad Kuramagomedov (HUN)	11
Fazlı Eryılmaz (TUR)	0
Zaurbek Sidakov (UWW)	4
Tajmuraz Salkazanov (SVK)	2

Semifinals
Chermen Valiev (ALB)	6
Aghanazar Novruzov (AZE)	0
Murad Kuramagomedov (HUN)	0
Zaurbek Sidakov (UWW)	2

Final
Chermen Valiev (ALB)	4
Zaurbek Sidakov (UWW)	2

Repechage round 1
Rasul Shapiev (MKD)	0
Tajmuraz Salkazanov (SVK)	4

Bronze medal match
Ramazan Ramazanov (BUL)	4
Aghanazar Novruzov (AZE)	6
Tajmuraz Salkazanov (SVK)	3
Murad Kuramagomedov (HUN)	0

== Final standing ==
Rank	Athlete
1st place, gold medalist(s)	Chermen Valiev (ALB)
2nd place, silver medalist(s)	Zaurbek Sidakov (UWW)
3rd place, bronze medalist(s)	Aghanazar Novruzov (AZE)
3rd place, bronze medalist(s)	Tajmuraz Salkazanov (SVK)
5	Ramazan Ramazanov (BUL)
5	Murad Kuramagomedov (HUN)
7	Giorgi Elbakidze (GEO)
8	Fazlı Eryılmaz (TUR)
9	Ion Marcu (MDA)
10	Kamil Rybicki (POL)
11	Narek Harutyunyan (ARM)
12	Ivan Kusyak (UKR)
13	Yahor Akulich (UWW)
14	Rasul Shapiev (MKD)
