= Zaur Makiev =

Russian freestyle wrestler

Zaur Makiev Заур Макиев
Personal information
- Full name: Zaur Yurevich Makiev
- National team: Russia
- Born: March 24, 1992 (age 34) Vladikavkaz, North Ossetia-Alania, Russia
- Height: 170 cm (5 ft 7 in)
- Weight: 86 kg (190 lb)

Sport
- Country: Russia
- Sport: Wrestling
- Weight class: 74 kg (163 lb); 79 kg (174 lb); 86 kg (190 lb)
- Event: Freestyle
- Coached by: Mairbek Samaev, Anatoly Tavgazov
Medal record
Men's freestyle wrestling
Representing Russia
European Championships
Bronze medal – third place	2016 Riga	74 kg
Russian National Championships
Bronze medal – third place	2014 Yakutsk	74 kg
Golden Grand Prix Ivan Yarygin
Gold medal – first place	2016 Krasnoyarsk	74 kg
Ramzan Kadyrov & Adlan Varayev Cup
Bronze medal – third place	2014 Grozny	74 kg
Dmitry Korkin Memorial
Gold medal – first place	2012 Yakutsk	74 kg
Junior World Championships
Gold medal – first place	2012 Pattaya	74 kg

Zaur Yurevich Makiev (Russian: Заур Юрьевич Макиев; born 24 March 1992 in RNO-Alania) is a Russian former freestyle wrestler of Ossetian heritage. He is junior world champion. 2014 Russian nationals bronze medalist (74 kg). He participated at the 2016 European Championships. where he was eliminated by Soner Demirtaş of Turkey in the 1/8 finals, but came back and won the bronze medal against Andrzej Sokalski of Poland (11–0). He is international master of sports in freestyle wrestling,
