= 2022 European Wrestling Championships – Men's freestyle 74 kg =

Wrestling competition

Men's freestyle 74 kg at the 2022 European Wrestling Championships
- Venue: BOK Sports Hall
- Location: Budapest, Hungary
- Dates: 29-30 March
- Competitors: 17

Medalists
gold medal	Tajmuraz Salkazanov	Slovakia
silver medal	Frank Chamizo	Italy
bronze medal	Turan Bayramov	Azerbaijan
bronze medal	Giorgi Sulava	Georgia

The men's freestyle 74 kg was a competition featured at the 2022 European Wrestling Championships, and was held in Budapest, Hungary on March 29 and 30.

== Results ==
Legend

- F — Won by fall
- R — Retired
- WO — Won by walkover

=== Final ===
Final
Tajmuraz Salkazanov (SVK)	7
Frank Chamizo (ITA)	5

=== Top half ===
Round of 32
Mihail Sava (MDA)	3
Zurab Kapraev (ROU)	8

Round of 16
Tajmuraz Salkazanov (SVK)	5
Kamil Rybicki (POL)	0
Zurab Kapraev (ROU)	7
Malik Amine (SMR)	6
Artem Auga (LTU)	0
Aimar Andruse (EST)	6
Turan Bayramov (AZE)	4
Ali-Pasha Umarpashaev (BUL)	3

Quarterfinals
Tajmuraz Salkazanov (SVK)	12
Zurab Kapraev (ROU)	1
Aimar Andruse (EST)	0
Turan Bayramov (AZE)	10

Semifinals
Tajmuraz Salkazanov (SVK)	8
Turan Bayramov (AZE)	2

=== Bottom half ===
Round of 32

Round of 16
Khetag Tsabolov (SRB)	0^{R}
Hrayr Alikhanyan (ARM)	4
Charlie Bowling (GBR)	0
Murad Kuramagomedov (HUN)	11
Mitch Finesilver (ISR)	2
Soner Demirtaş (TUR)	7
Giorgi Sulava (GEO)	2
Frank Chamizo (ITA)	10

Quarterfinals
Hrayr Alikhanyan (ARM)	3
Murad Kuramagomedov (HUN)	0
Soner Demirtaş (TUR)	0^{R}
Frank Chamizo (ITA)	5

Semifinals
Hrayr Alikhanyan (ARM)	1
Frank Chamizo (ITA)	7

=== Repechage ===
Repechage round 1
Kamil Rybicki (POL)	0
Zurab Kapraev (ROU)	5
Giorgi Sulava (GEO)	WO
Soner Demirtaş (TUR)

Bronze medal match
Zurab Kapraev (ROU)	1
Turan Bayramov (AZE)	2
Giorgi Sulava (GEO)	17
Hrayr Alikhanyan (ARM)	5

== Final standing ==
Rank	Wrestler	UWW Points
1st place, gold medalist(s)	Tajmuraz Salkazanov (SVK)	15000
2nd place, silver medalist(s)	Frank Chamizo (ITA)	13000
3rd place, bronze medalist(s)	Turan Bayramov (AZE)	11500
3rd place, bronze medalist(s)	Giorgi Sulava (GEO)	11500
5	Zurab Kapraev (ROU)	10000
5	Hrayr Alikhanyan (ARM)	10000
7	Murad Kuramagomedov (HUN)	9400
8	Soner Demirtaş (TUR)	9000
9	Aimar Andruse (EST)	8500
10	Malik Amine (SMR)	8100
11	Ali-Pasha Umarpashaev (BUL)	6000
12	Mihail Sava (MDA)	5800
13	Mitch Finesilver (ISR)	5600
14	Khetag Tsabolov (SRB)	5400
15	Artem Auga (LTU)	5200
16	Kamil Rybicki (POL)	5100
17	Charlie Bowling (GBR)	0
