= 2016 European Wrestling Championships – Men's freestyle 74 kg =

The men's freestyle 74 kg is a competition featured at the 2016 European Wrestling Championships, and was held in Riga, Latvia on March 10.

== Medalists ==
Gold	Soner Demirtaş; Turkey
Silver	Jabrayil Hasanov; Azerbaijan
Bronze	Jakob Makarashvili; Georgia
Bronze	Zaur Makiev; Russia

== Results ==
Legend

- R — Retired
- F — Won by fall

=== Final ===
Final
Jabrayil Hasanov (AZE)	1
Soner Demirtaş (TUR)	2

=== Top half ===
==== Section 1 ====
Round of 32

Round of 16
Giya Chykhladze (UKR)	0
Ali Shabanau (BLR)	1^{R}
Jakob Makarashvili (GEO)	0
Jabrayil Hasanov (AZE)	5^{F}
Miroslav Kirov (BUL)	4^{F}
Amirkhan Vialimov (AUT)	2
Martin Obst (GER)	4
Georgios Savvoulidis (GRE)	2

Quarterfinals
Giya Chykhladze (UKR)	3
Jabrayil Hasanov (AZE)	4
Miroslav Kirov (BUL)	5
Georgios Savvoulidis (GRE)	3

Semifinals
Jabrayil Hasanov (AZE)	10
Miroslav Kirov (BUL)	0

==== Section 3 ====
Round of 32
Andrzej Sokalski (POL)	4
Balint Molnar (HUN)	2
Michal Duba (SVK)	4
Aleksandrs Pomjalovs (LAT)	2

Round of 16
Soner Demirtaş (TUR)	7
Zaur Makiev (RUS)	0
Grigor Grigoryan (ARM)	7
Evgheni Nedealco (MDA)	4
Hanoch Rachamin (ISR)	4
Henri Selenius (FIN)	6
Andrzej Sokalski (POL)	5
Michal Duba (SVK)	3

Quarterfinals
Soner Demirtaş (TUR)	12
Grigor Grigoryan (ARM)	1
Henri Selenius (FIN)	4
Andrzej Sokalski (POL)	8

Semifinals
Soner Demirtaş (TUR)	10
Andrzej Sokalski (POL)	0

=== Repechage ===
Repechage round 2
Jakob Makarashvili (GEO)	10
Giya Chykhladze (UKR)	0
Zaur Makiev (RUS)	10
Grigor Grigoryan (ARM)	0

Bronze medals
Jakob Makarashvili (GEO)	10
Miroslav Kirov (BUL)	0
Zaur Makiev (RUS)	11
Andrzej Sokalski (POL)	0
