= 2023 European Wrestling Championships – Men's freestyle 74 kg =

Wrestling competition

Men's freestyle 74 kg at the 2023 European Wrestling Championships
- Venue: Arena Zagreb
- Location: Zagreb, Croatia
- Dates: 18-19 April
- Competitors: 18

Medalists
gold medal	Tajmuraz Salkazanov	Slovakia
silver medal	Frank Chamizo	Italy
bronze medal	Avtandil Kentchadze	Georgia
bronze medal	Soner Demirtaş	Turkey

The Men's Freestyle 74 kg is a competition featured at the 2023 European Wrestling Championships, and was held in Zagreb, Croatia on April 18 and 19.

== Results ==
Legend

- F — Won by fall
- R — Retired
- WO — Won by walkover

=== Final ===
Final
Tajmuraz Salkazanov (SVK)	3
Frank Chamizo (ITA)	1

=== Top half ===
Round of 32
Murad Kuramagomedov (HUN)	10
Erik Reinbok (EST)	0

Round of 16
Tajmuraz Salkazanov (SVK)	5
Rasul Shapiev (MKD)	0
Murad Kuramagomedov (HUN)	3
Hrayr Alikhanyan (ARM)	5
Avtandil Kentchadze (GEO)	8
Semen Radulov (UKR)	0
Tobias Portmann (SUI)	4
Iakub Shikhdzamalov (ROU)	1

Quarterfinals
Tajmuraz Salkazanov (SVK)	3
Hrayr Alikhanyan (ARM)	0
Avtandil Kentchadze (GEO)	11
Tobias Portmann (SUI)	0

Semifinals
Tajmuraz Salkazanov (SVK)	5
Avtandil Kentchadze (GEO)	1

=== Bottom half ===
Round of 32
Simon Marchl (AUT)	1
Dzhabrail Gadzhiev (AZE)	6

Round of 16
Mitch Finesilver (ISR)	5
Szymon Wojtkowski (POL)	0
Malik Amine (SMR)	0
Ali-Pasha Umarpashaev (BUL)	4^{F}
Frank Chamizo (ITA)	9
Dzhabrail Gadzhiev (AZE)	4
Nicolai Grahmez (MDA)	0
Soner Demirtaş (TUR)	7

Quarterfinals
Mitch Finesilver (ISR)	3
Ali-Pasha Umarpashaev (BUL)	4
Frank Chamizo (ITA)	8
Soner Demirtaş (TUR)	6

Semifinals
Ali-Pasha Umarpashaev (BUL)	0^{R}
Frank Chamizo (ITA)	9

Repechage round 1
Rasul Shapiev (MKD)	2
Hrayr Alikhanyan (ARM)	3
Dzhabrail Gadzhiev (AZE)	4
Soner Demirtaş (TUR)	5

Bronze medal match
Hrayr Alikhanyan (ARM)	0
Avtandil Kentchadze (GEO)	8
Soner Demirtaş (TUR)	WO
Ali-Pasha Umarpashaev (BUL)

== Final standing ==
Rank	Athlete
1st place, gold medalist(s)	Tajmuraz Salkazanov (SVK)
2nd place, silver medalist(s)	Frank Chamizo (ITA)
3rd place, bronze medalist(s)	Soner Demirtaş (TUR)
3rd place, bronze medalist(s)	Avtandil Kentchadze (GEO)
5	Hrayr Alikhanyan (ARM)
5	Ali-Pasha Umarpashaev (BUL)
7	Murad Kuramagomedov (HUN)
8	Dzhabrail Gadzhiev (AZE)
9	Mitch Finesilver (ISR)
10	Tobias Portmann (SUI)
11	Rasul Shapiev (MKD)
12	Iakub Shikhdzamalovv (ROU)
13	Simon Marchl (AUT)
14	Malik Amine (SMR)
15	Szymon Wojtkowski (POL)
16	Nicolai Grahmez (MDA)
17	Semen Radulov (UKR)
18	Erik Reinbok (EST)
