= 2021 European Wrestling Championships – Men's freestyle 70 kg =

Wrestling competition

The men's freestyle 70 kg is a competition featured at the 2021 European Wrestling Championships, and was held in Warsaw, Poland on April 19 and April 20.

== Medalists ==
Gold	Israil Kasumov; Russia
Silver	Turan Bayramov; Azerbaijan
Bronze	Ihor Nykyforuk; Ukraine
Bronze	Arman Andreasyan; Armenia

== Results ==
Legend

- F — Won by fall
- R — Retired
- WO — Won by walkover

1/8 finals
Gianluca Talamo (ITA)	0
Dzianis Salavei (BLR)	10
Ihor Nykyforuk (UKR)	9
Orges Lila (ALB)	0
Nicolae Cojocaru (GBR)	0
Turan Bayramov (AZE)	10
Davit Tlashadze (GEO)	0
Haydar Yavuz (TUR)	10
Patryk Ołenczyn (POL)	11
Daniel Chomanič (SVK)	0
Artem Auga (LTU)	0
Arman Andreasyan (ARM)	10
Dániel Antal (HUN)	7
Fati Vejseli (MKD)	4
Israil Kasumov (RUS)	10
Mihail Sava (MDA)	0

Quarterfinals
Dzianis Salavei (BLR)	0
Ihor Nykyforuk (UKR)	10
Turan Bayramov (AZE)	3
Haydar Yavuz (TUR)	2^{R}
Patryk Ołenczyn (POL)	5
Arman Andreasyan (ARM)	10
Dániel Antal (HUN)	0
Israil Kasumov (RUS)	10

Semifinals
Ihor Nykyforuk (UKR)	0
Turan Bayramov (AZE)	5
Arman Andreasyan (ARM)	3
Israil Kasumov (RUS)	5

Final
Turan Bayramov (AZE)	1
Israil Kasumov (RUS)	3

Repechage round 1
Nicolae Cojocaru (GBR)	WO
Haydar Yavuz (TUR)
Mihail Sava (MDA)	10
Dániel Antal (HUN)	2

Bronze medal match
Nicolae Cojocaru (GBR)
Ihor Nykyforuk (UKR)	WO
Mihail Sava (MDA)	3
Arman Andreasyan (ARM)	4

== Final standing ==
Rank	Athlete
1st place, gold medalist(s)	Israil Kasumov (RUS)
2nd place, silver medalist(s)	Turan Bayramov (AZE)
3rd place, bronze medalist(s)	Ihor Nykyforuk (UKR)
3rd place, bronze medalist(s)	Arman Andreasyan (ARM)
5	Nicolae Cojocaru (GBR)
5	Mihail Sava (MDA)
7	Patryk Ołenczyn (POL)
8	Haydar Yavuz (TUR)
9	Dzianis Salavei (BLR)
10	Dániel Antal (HUN)
11	Fati Vejseli (MKD)
12	Orges Lila (ALB)
13	Gianluca Talamo (ITA)
14	Davit Tlashadze (GEO)
15	Artem Auga (LTU)
16	Daniel Chomanič (SVK)
