= 2019 World Wrestling Championships – Men's freestyle 79 kg =

Men's freestyle 79 kg at the 2019 World Championships
- Venue: Barys Arena
- Dates: 21–22 September 2019
- Competitors: 23 from 23 nations

Medalists
gold medal	Kyle Dake	United States
silver medal	Jabrayil Hasanov	Azerbaijan
bronze medal	Gadzhi Nabiev	Russia
bronze medal	Tajmuraz Salkazanov	Slovakia

The men's freestyle 79 kilograms is a competition featured at the 2019 World Wrestling Championships, and was held in Nur-Sultan, Kazakhstan on 21 and 22 September.

This freestyle wrestling competition consists of a single-elimination tournament, with a repechage used to determine the winner of two bronze medals. The two finalists face off for gold and silver medals. Each wrestler who loses to one of the two finalists moves into the repechage, culminating in a pair of bronze medal matches featuring the semifinal losers each facing the remaining repechage opponent from their half of the bracket.

== Results ==
Legend

- F — Won by fall

=== Final ===
Final
Kyle Dake (USA)	4
Jabrayil Hasanov (AZE)	2

=== Top half ===
Round of 32
Jang Woo-min (KOR)	2
Rashid Kurbanov (UZB)	12

Round of 16
Kyle Dake (USA)	12
Oibek Nasirov (KGZ)	2
Gadzhi Nabiev (RUS)	5
Yudai Takahashi (JPN)	0
Grigor Grigoryan (ARM)	7^{F}
Nika Kentchadze (GEO)	6
Rashid Kurbanov (UZB)	13
Bahman Teymouri (IRI)	10

Quarterfinals
Kyle Dake (USA)	5
Gadzhi Nabiev (RUS)	1
Grigor Grigoryan (ARM)	8
Rashid Kurbanov (UZB)	8

Semifinals
Kyle Dake (USA)	6
Rashid Kurbanov (UZB)	1

=== Bottom half ===
Round of 32
Gheorghi Pascalov (MDA)	2
Jitender Kumar (IND)	7
Tajmuraz Salkazanov (SVK)	7
Ayoub Barraj (TUN)	1
Dorjvaanchigiin Gombodorj (MGL)	11
Lin Zeping (CHN)	8
Hanoch Rachamin (ISR)	0
Galymzhan Usserbayev (KAZ)	10
Murad Gaidarov (BLR)	3
Omaraskhab Nazhmudinov (ROU)	6
Andrzej Sokalski (POL)	2
Dmytrii Tkachenko (UKR)	7

Round of 16
Muhammet Nuri Kotanoğlu (TUR)	1
Jitender Kumar (IND)	7
Tajmuraz Salkazanov (SVK)	2
Dorjvaanchigiin Gombodorj (MGL)	1
Galymzhan Usserbayev (KAZ)	4
Omaraskhab Nazhmudinov (ROU)	3
Dmytrii Tkachenko (UKR)	0
Jabrayil Hasanov (AZE)	7

Quarterfinals
Jitender Kumar (IND)	0
Tajmuraz Salkazanov (SVK)	4
Galymzhan Usserbayev (KAZ)	4
Jabrayil Hasanov (AZE)	13

Semifinals
Tajmuraz Salkazanov (SVK)	3
Jabrayil Hasanov (AZE)	4

=== Repechage ===
Repechage round 2
Oibek Nasirov (KGZ)	2
Gadzhi Nabiev (RUS)	8
Dmytrii Tkachenko (UKR)	1
Galymzhan Usserbayev (KAZ)	5

Bronze medals
Gadzhi Nabiev (RUS)	8
Rashid Kurbanov (UZB)	3
Galymzhan Usserbayev (KAZ)	2
Tajmuraz Salkazanov (SVK)	3

- Dmytrii Tkachenko of Ukraine originally finished 11th, but was disqualified later.
