= 2022 World Wrestling Championships – Men's freestyle 74 kg =

Wrestling competitions

Men's freestyle 74 kg at the 2022 World Championships
- Venue: Štark Arena
- Dates: 16–17 September 2022
- Competitors: 34 from 34 nations

Medalists
gold medal	Kyle Dake	United States
silver medal	Tajmuraz Salkazanov	Slovakia
bronze medal	Younes Emami	Iran
bronze medal	Soner Demirtaş	Turkey

The men's freestyle 74 kilograms is a competition featured at the 2022 World Wrestling Championships, and was held in Belgrade, Serbia on 16 and 17 September 2022.

== Results ==
Legend

- F — Won by fall

=== Finals ===
Semifinals		Final
Kyle Dake (USA)	2
Younes Emami (IRI)	2	Kyle Dake (USA)	3
Frank Chamizo (ITA)	0	Tajmuraz Salkazanov (SVK)	1
Tajmuraz Salkazanov (SVK)	3

=== Top half ===
==== Section 1 ====
Round of 64
Zielimkhan Tohuzov (UKR)	12
Franklin Marén (CUB)	2

Round of 32
Kyle Dake (USA)	10
Islambek Orozbekov (KGZ)	0
David Ste-Marie (MRI)	0
Olonbayaryn Süldkhüü (MGL)	10
Zielimkhan Tohuzov (UKR)	3
Diego Sandoval (MEX)	8
Sagar Jaglan (IND)	15
Mitch Finesilver (ISR)	4

Round of 16
Kyle Dake (USA)	12
Olonbayaryn Süldkhüü (MGL)	2
Diego Sandoval (MEX)	2
Sagar Jaglan (IND)	13

Quarterfinals
Kyle Dake (USA)	5^{F}
Sagar Jaglan (IND)	0

==== Section 2 ====
Round of 64

Round of 32
Younes Emami (IRI)	10
Enrique Pérez (GUA)	0
Menghejigan (CHN)	1
Aimar Andruse (EST)	11
Jasmit Phulka (CAN)	13
Mathayo Mahabila (KEN)	4
Miroslav Kirov (BUL)	0
Turan Bayramov (AZE)	5

Round of 16
Younes Emami (IRI)	10
Aimar Andruse (EST)	0
Jasmit Phulka (CAN)	0
Turan Bayramov (AZE)	9

Quarterfinals
Younes Emami (IRI)	8
Turan Bayramov (AZE)	4

=== Bottom half ===
==== Section 3 ====
Round of 64

Round of 32
Frank Chamizo (ITA)	14
Giorgi Sulava (GEO)	8
Malik Amine (SMR)	2
Lee Seung-bong (KOR)	4
Maxim Vasilioglo (ROU)	0
Hrayr Alikhanyan (ARM)	7
Kamil Rybicki (POL)	0
Khetag Tsabolov (SRB)	10

Round of 16
Frank Chamizo (ITA)	11
Lee Seung-bong (KOR)	4
Hrayr Alikhanyan (ARM)	0
Khetag Tsabolov (SRB)	2^{F}

Quarterfinals
Frank Chamizo (ITA)	6
Khetag Tsabolov (SRB)	3

==== Section 4 ====
Round of 64
Reagan Ndombasi (COD)	0
Vasile Diacon (MDA)	10

Round of 32
Soner Demirtaş (TUR)	10
Asomiddin Khasanov (UZB)	0
Franklin Gómez (PUR)	4
Vasile Diacon (MDA)	4
Daichi Takatani (JPN)	6
Nurkozha Kaipanov (KAZ)	6
Cesar Alvan (BRA)	0
Tajmuraz Salkazanov (SVK)	13

Round of 16
Soner Demirtaş (TUR)	6
Vasile Diacon (MDA)	3
Daichi Takatani (JPN)	1
Tajmuraz Salkazanov (SVK)	3

Quarterfinals
Soner Demirtaş (TUR)	1
Tajmuraz Salkazanov (SVK)	3

=== Repechage ===
Repechage round 2
Islambek Orozbekov (KGZ)	5
Olonbayaryn Süldkhüü (MGL)	6
Cesar Alvan (BRA)	0
Daichi Takatani (JPN)	10

Repechage round 3
Olonbayaryn Süldkhüü (MGL)	3
Sagar Jaglan (IND)	7
Daichi Takatani (JPN)	0
Soner Demirtaş (TUR)	5

Bronze medals
Sagar Jaglan (IND)	0
Younes Emami (IRI)	6
Soner Demirtaş (TUR)	3
Frank Chamizo (ITA)	5

== Final standing ==
Rank	Athlete
1st place, gold medalist(s)	Kyle Dake (USA)
2nd place, silver medalist(s)	Tajmuraz Salkazanov (SVK)
3rd place, bronze medalist(s)	Younes Emami (IRI)
3rd place, bronze medalist(s)	Soner Demirtaş (TUR)
5	Sagar Jaglan (IND)
6	Khetag Tsabolov (SRB)
7	Olonbayaryn Süldkhüü (MGL)
8	Vasile Diacon (MDA)
9	Daichi Takatani (JPN)
10	Turan Bayramov (AZE)
11	Zielimkhan Tohuzov (UKR)
12	Aimar Andruse (EST)
13	Diego Sandoval (MEX)
14	Lee Seung-bong (KOR)
15	Jasmit Phulka (CAN)
16	Hrayr Alikhanyan (ARM)
17	Giorgi Sulava (GEO)
18	Nurkozha Kaipanov (KAZ)
19	Islambek Orozbekov (KGZ)
20	Franklin Gómez (PUR)
21	Mathayo Mahabila (KEN)
22	Mitch Finesilver (ISR)
23	Malik Amine (SMR)
24	Franklin Marén (CUB)
25	Menghejigan (CHN)
26	Miroslav Kirov (BUL)
27	Maxim Vasilioglo (ROU)
28	David Ste-Marie (MRI)
29	Enrique Pérez (GUA)
30	Kamil Rybicki (POL)
31	Asomiddin Khasanov (UZB)
32	Reagan Ndombasi (COD)
33	Cesar Alvan (BRA)
DQ	Frank Chamizo (ITA)

- Frank Chamizo of Italy originally won the bronze medal, but was disqualified after he tested positive for cannabis.
