= 2026 European Wrestling Championships – Men's freestyle 74 kg =

Wrestling competition

Men's freestyle 74 kg at the 2026 European Wrestling Championships
- Venue: Tirana Olympic Park
- Location: Tirana, Albania
- Dates: 25-26 April
- Competitors: 14

Medalists
gold medal	Tajmuraz Salkazanov	Slovakia
silver medal	Turan Bayramov	Azerbaijan
bronze medal	Farhad Nouri
bronze medal	Timur Bizhoev

The men's freestyle 74 kg is a competition featured at the 2026 European Wrestling Championships, and was held in Tirana, Albania on April 25 and 26.

== Results ==
Legend

- F — Won by fall

=== Main bracket ===
Round of 16
Seifulla Itaev (FRA)	0
Ihor Nykyforuk (UKR)	4^{F}
Nikita Dmitrijevs Mayeuski (UWW)	4
Ömer Faruk Çayır (TUR)	2
Turan Bayramov (AZE)	3
Farhad Nouri (UWW)	2
Murad Kuramagomedov (HUN)	11
Mihail Georgiev (BUL)	0
Narek Harutyunyan (ARM)	5
Ion Marcu (MDA)	5
Timur Bizhoev (UWW)	11
Ibragim Veliev (BEL)	0

Quarterfinals
Giorgi Elbakidze (GEO)	8
Ihor Nykyforuk (UKR)	4
Nikita Dmitrijevs Mayeuski (UWW)	0
Turan Bayramov (AZE)	8
Murad Kuramagomedov (HUN)	8
Narek Harutyunyan (ARM)	0
Timur Bizhoev (UWW)	1
Tajmuraz Salkazanov (SVK)	2

Semifinals
Giorgi Elbakidze (GEO)	1
Turan Bayramov (AZE)	2
Murad Kuramagomedov (HUN)	1
Tajmuraz Salkazanov (SVK)	1

Final
Turan Bayramov (AZE)	2
Tajmuraz Salkazanov (SVK)	4

=== Repechage ===
Repechage round 1
Farhad Nouri (UWW)	9
Nikita Dmitrijevs Mayeuski (UWW)	6

Bronze medal matches
Farhad Nouri (UWW)	10
Giorgi Elbakidze (GEO)	8
Timur Bizhoev (UWW)	2
Murad Kuramagomedov (HUN)	1

== Final standing ==
Rank	Athlete
1st place, gold medalist(s)	Tajmuraz Salkazanov (SVK)
2nd place, silver medalist(s)	Turan Bayramov (AZE)
3rd place, bronze medalist(s)	Farhad Nouri (UWW)
3rd place, bronze medalist(s)	Timur Bizhoev (UWW)
5	Giorgi Elbakidze (GEO)
5	Murad Kuramagomedov (HUN)
7	Ihor Nykyforuk (UKR)
8	Nikita Dmitrijevs Mayeuski (UWW)
9	Narek Harutyunyan (ARM)
10	Ion Marcu (MDA)
11	Ömer Faruk Çayır (TUR)
12	Seyfulla Itaev (FRA)
13	Mihail Georgiev (BUL)
14	Ibragim Veliev (BEL)
