= Gadzhi Nabiev =

Russian freestyle wrestler

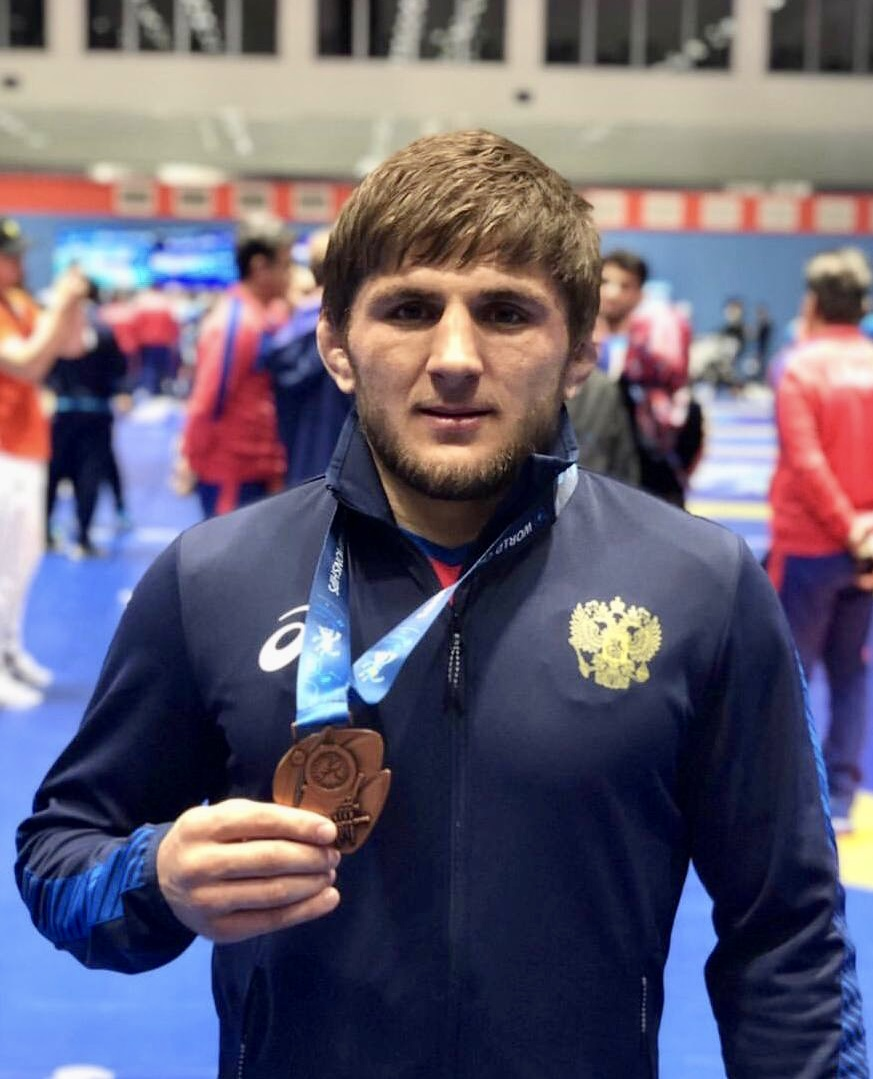

Personal information
- Native name: Гаджи Камилович Набиев
- Full name: Gadzhi Kamilovich Nabiev
- Nationality: Russia
- Born: June 5, 1996 (age 30) Makhachkala, Dagestan, Russia
- Height: 174 cm (5 ft 9 in)

Sport
- Country: Russia
- Sport: Amateur wrestling
- Weight class: 79 kg
- Event: Freestyle
Medal record
Men's freestyle wrestling
Representing Russia
World Championships
Bronze medal – third place	2019 Nur-Sultan	79 kg
Russian National Championships
Gold medal – first place	2019 Sochi	79 kg
Silver medal – second place	2017 Nazran	79 kg
Bronze medal – third place	2018 Odinzevo	79 kg
Bronze medal – third place	2020 Naro-Fominsk	79 kg
Bronze medal – third place	2021 Ulan-Ude	79 kg
Golden Grand Prix Ivan Yarygin
Bronze medal – third place	2022 Krasnoyarsk	79 kg
World U23 Championships
Gold medal – first place	2017 Bydgoszcz	74 kg
Silver medal – second place	2018 Bucharest	79 kg
World Juniors Championships
Gold medal – first place	2015 Salvador	74 kg

Gadzhi Kamilovich Nabiev (Russian: Гаджи Камилович Набиев; born 5 June 1996 in Dagestan) is a Russian freestyle wrestler who competes at 79 kilograms. He won a bronze medal at the 2019 World Championships after claiming the Russian National Championship (medaled in 2017, 2018, 2020 and 2021) and became the U23 World Champion in 2017 (runner–up in 2018). He was also the 2015 Junior World Champion.

== Major results ==
Year	Tournament	Location	Result	Event
2019	World Championships	Nur-Sultan, Kazakhstan	3rd	Freestyle 79 kg
