= Chermen Valiev =

Russian sport wrestler (born 1998)

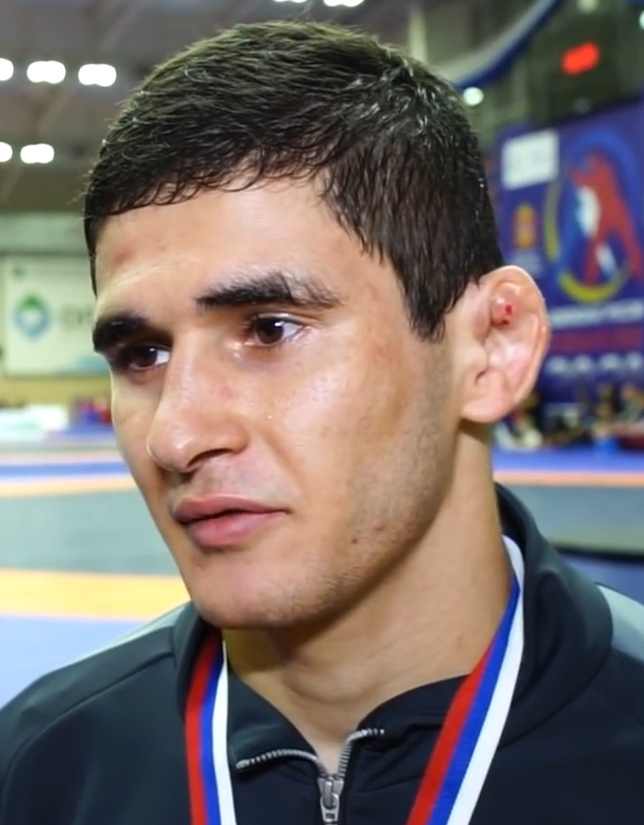
- Valiyev in 2020

Personal information
- Native name: Чермен Ахсарбекович Валиев
- Full name: Chermen Akhsarbekovich Valiev
- Born: 10 December 1998 (age 27) North Ossetia, Russia

Sport
- Country: Russia (2014–2024); Albania (2024–present)
- Sport: Wrestling
- Weight class: 74 kg
- Rank: International Master of Sport in freestyle wrestling
- Event: Freestyle
- Club: Wrestling Academy of Aslan Khadartsev
- Coached by: Kakhaber Dzukaev
Medal record
Men's freestyle wrestling
Representing Albania
Olympic Games
Bronze medal – third place	2024 Paris	74 kg
World Championships
Silver medal – second place	2025 Zagreb	74 kg
European Championships
Gold medal – first place	2025 Bratislava	74 kg
World Military Championships
Gold medal – first place	2025 Warendorf	74 kg
Grand Prix
Gold medal – first place	2024 Tirana	74 kg
Gold medal – first place	2025 Tirana	74 kg
Representing Russia
U23 World Championships
Gold medal – first place	2021 Serbia	74 kg
Silver medal – second place	2019 Budapest	70 kg
U23 European Championships
Gold medal – first place	2021 Skopje	74 kg
U20 European Championships
Gold medal – first place	2018 Rome	70 kg
Grand Prix
Bronze medal – third place	2023 Krasnoyarsk	74 kg
Bronze medal – third place	2022 Yakutsk	74 kg
Bronze medal – third place	2022 Nefteyugansk	74 kg
Bronze medal – third place	2022 Moscow	74 kg
Gold medal – first place	2022 Krasnoyarsk	74 kg
Bronze medal – third place	2020 Krasnoyarsk	70 kg
Gold medal – first place	2019 Vladikavkaz	70 kg
Bronze medal – third place	2019 Ulan-Ude	70 kg
Bronze medal – third place	2019 Kaspisk	70 kg
Gold medal – first place	2018 Nefteyugansk	70 kg
Bronze medal – third place	2017 Yakutsk	70 kg
Silver medal – second place	2017 Krasnoyarsk	65 kg
Russian National Championships
Gold medal – first place	2023 Kaspiysk	74 kg
Silver medal – second place	2022 Kyzyl	74 kg
Bronze medal – third place	2021 Ulan-Ude	70 kg
Gold medal – first place	2020 Naro-Fominsk	70 kg
Bronze medal – third place	2019 Sochi	70 kg

Chermen Akhsarbekovich Valiev (Russian: Чермен Ахсарбекович Валиев; born 10 December 1998) is a Russian-born Albanian freestyle wrestler of Ossetian heritage who competes at 74 kilograms. For his native Russia, Valiev was a U23 World and European champion, a Russian National champion and a multiple-time gold medalist at international tournaments.

After transferring to Albania in 2024, Valiev earned a bronze medal for Albania at the 2024 Summer Olympics, having qualified by placing third at the World Olympic Qualification Tournament.

After winning a gold medal at the 2025 European Wrestling Championships in Bratislava, Slovakia, Valiev was subjected to abuse by Russian Wrestling Federation president Mikhail Mamiashvili. Footage at the awards ceremony appeared to show Mamiashvili aggressively placing the gold medal on Valiev and saying something that upset Valiev before Mamiashvili grabbed him in both arms, shoved a bouquet into Valiev's hands and walked away. Valiev later said that Mamiashvili accused him of being a traitor over his transfer to Albania.
