= Avtandil Kentchadze =

Georgian wrestler (born 1995)

Avtandil Kentchadze ავთანდილ კენჭაძე
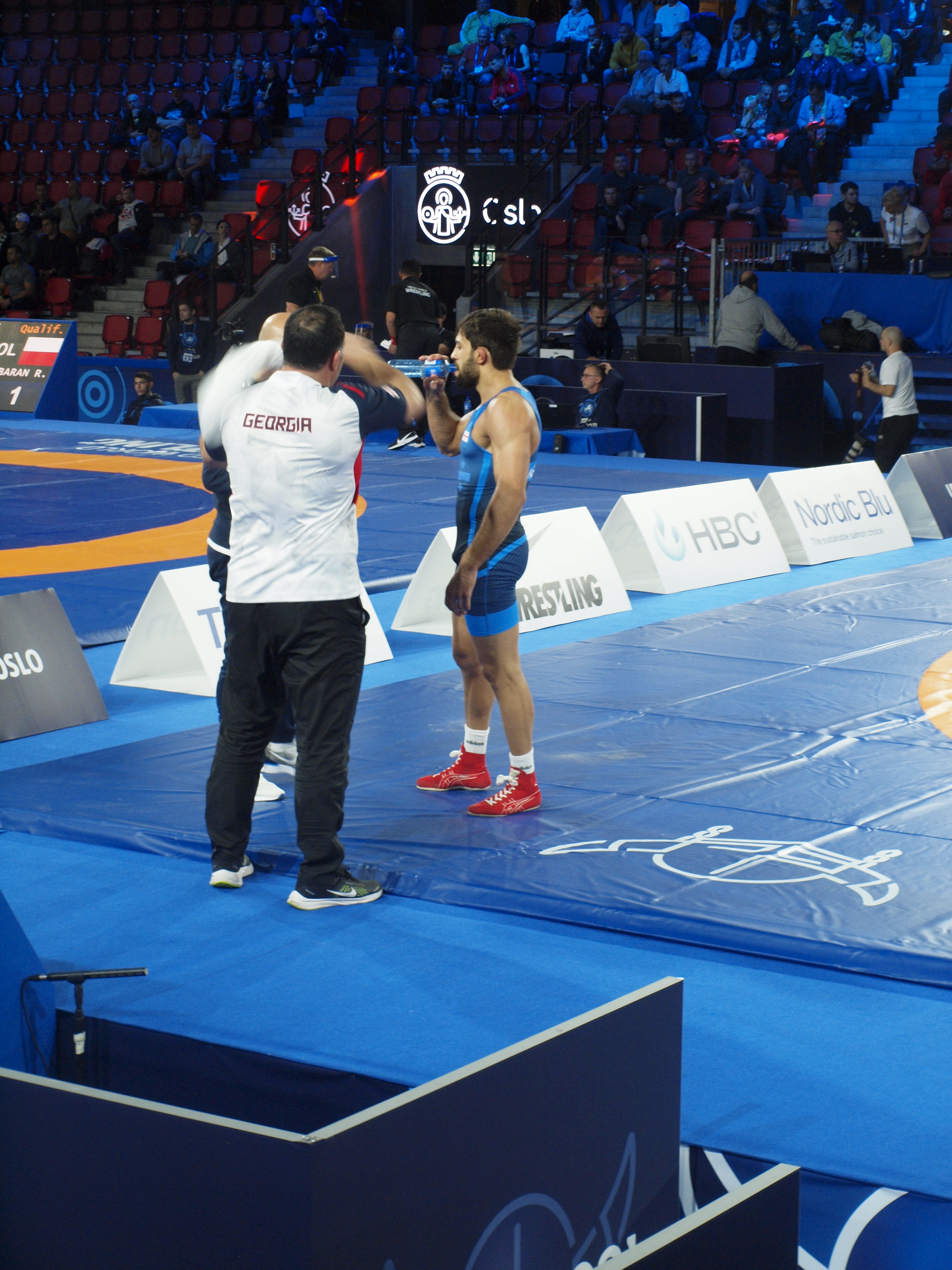
- 2021 World Wrestling Championships

Personal information
- Nationality: Georgian
- Born: December 22, 1995 (age 30) Ambrolauri, Georgia
- Height: 175 cm (5 ft 9 in)
- Weight: 70 kg (154 lb)-74kg

Sport
- Sport: Wrestling
- Event: Freestyle
- Club: Olympic Training Center, Tbilisi Wrestling Club
- Coached by: Giorgi Gogshelidze
Medal record
Representing Georgia
World Championships
Disqualified	2024 Tirana	79 kg
Silver medal – second place	2018 Budapest	74 kg
European Championships
Bronze medal – third place	2019 Bucharest	74 kg
Bronze medal – third place	2020 Rome	74 kg
Bronze medal – third place	2023 Zagreb	74 kg
Bronze medal – third place	2024 Bucharest	79 kg
European Games
Bronze medal – third place	2019 Minsk	74kg
Golden Grand Prix
Silver medal – second place	2016 Baku	74 kg
Grand Prix
Gold medal – first place	2017 Vanadzor	74 kg
Gold medal – first place	2018 Warsaw	74 kg
Gold medal – first place	2019 Kyiv	74 kg
Silver medal – second place	2018 Paris	70 kg
Silver medal – second place	2018 Vladikavkaz	74 kg
Silver medal – second place	2022 New York	79 kg
Silver medal – second place	2023 Zagreb	79 kg
Bronze medal – third place	2017 Warsaw	74 kg
World U23 Championships
Gold medal – first place	2018 Bucharest	74 kg
Bronze medal – third place	2017 Bydgoszcz	74 kg
European U23 Wrestling Championships
Gold medal – first place	2017 Szombathely	74 kg
Bronze medal – third place	2018 Istanbul	74 kg

Avtandil Kentchadze (Georgian: ავთანდილ კენჭაძე; born December 22, 1995) is a Georgian wrestler who won a silver medal at the 2018 World Wrestling Championships.

== Career ==
Kentchadze also captured a bronze medal at both the U23 Senior European Championships in 2018 and U23 senior World Champions held in 2017. In March 2021, he competed at the European Qualification Tournament in Budapest, Hungary hoping to qualify for the 2020 Summer Olympics in Tokyo, Japan. He competed in the men's 74 kg event at the 2020 Summer Olympics.

In 2025, Georgian wrestler Avtandil Kentchadze was sanctioned after testing positive for the prohibited substance clomifene. The positive results came from two in-competition samples collected on 31 October 2024 during the Senior World Championships and on 13 January 2025 during the 2025 Georgian National Wrestling Championships. The International Testing Agency (ITA), acting on behalf of United World Wrestling (UWW), imposed a 20-month period of ineligibility from 25 May 2025 until 24 January 2027, while his competitive results from 31 October 2024 to 4 September 2025 were disqualified.
