= Miroslav Kirov =

Bulgarian freestyle wrestler

Personal information
- Full name: Miroslav Stefanov Kirov
- Nationality: Bulgaria
- Born: Мирослав Стефанов Киров; 23 May 1991 (age 35) Sliven, Bulgaria
- Height: 175 cm (5 ft 9 in)

Sport
- Country: Bulgaria
- Sport: Amateur wrestling
- Weight class: 74 kg
- Event: Freestyle
- Club: Wrestling Club, Russe
- Coached by: Jordan Derev

Achievements and titles
- World finals: 5th(2015)
- Regional finals: (silver) (2021) (bronze) (2014)
Medal record
Men's freestyle wrestling
Representing Bulgaria
European Championships
| Silver medal – second place | 2021 Warsaw | 74 kg |
| Bronze medal – third place | 2014 Vantaa | 70 kg |
Alany Tournament
| Bronze medal – third place | 2017 Vladikavkaz | 70 kg |
World Juniors Championships
| Bronze medal – third place | 2011 Bucharest | 74 kg |

Miroslav Stefanov Kirov (born 23 May 1991) is a Bulgarian freestyle wrestler. He won the silver medal in the men's 74 kg event at the 2021 European Wrestling Championships held in Warsaw, Poland.

He competed in the 74 kg event at the 2022 World Wrestling Championships held in Belgrade, Serbia.

Kirov competed at the 2024 European Wrestling Olympic Qualification Tournament in Baku, Azerbaijan hoping to qualify for the 2024 Summer Olympics in Paris, France. He was eliminated in his third match and he did not qualify for the Olympics.

== Achievements ==
| Year | Tournament | Venue | Result | Event |
|---|---|---|---|---|
| 2014 | European Championships | Vantaa, Finland | 3rd | Freestyle 70 kg |
| 2021 | European Championships | Warsaw, Poland | 2nd | Freestyle 74 kg |
