= Turan Bayramov =

Azerbaijani freestyle wrestler and judoka

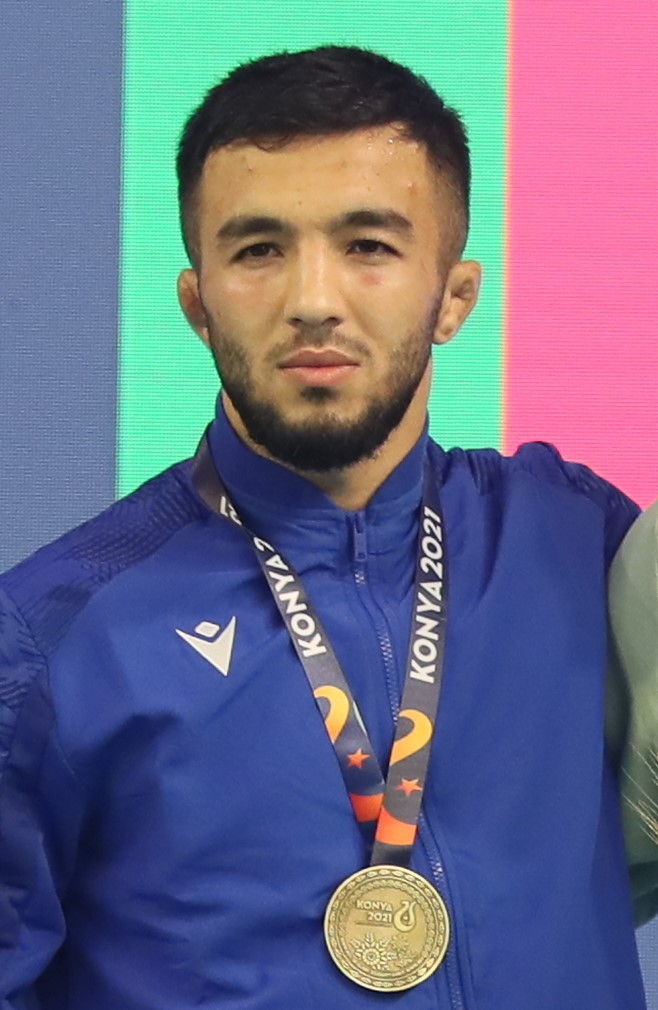
- Bayramov at 2021 Islamic Solidarity Games

Personal information
- Nationality: Azerbaijan
- Born: 11 January 2001 (age 25) Ganja, Azerbaijan
- Height: 170 cm (5 ft 7 in)

Sport
- Country: Azerbaijan
- Sport: Amateur wrestling
- Weight class: 74 kg
- Event: Freestyle

Achievements and titles
- Olympic finals: 8th(2020)
- World finals: 5th(2021)
- Regional finals: (silver) (2021) (bronze) (2022)
Medal record
Men's freestyle wrestling
Representing Azerbaijan
European Championships
Silver medal – second place	2021 Warsaw	70 kg
Silver medal – second place	2026 Tirana	74 kg
Bronze medal – third place	2022 Budapest	74 kg
Bronze medal – third place	2024 Bucharest	74 kg
Islamic Solidarity Games
Gold medal – first place	2021 Konya	74 kg
World Military Championships
Gold medal – first place	2023 Baku	74 kg
Yasar Dogu Tournament
Bronze medal – third place	2020 Istanbul	65 kg
Dan Kolov & Nikola Petrov Tournament
Silver medal – second place	2022 Veliko Tarnovo	74 kg
Grand Prix
Gold medal – first place	2023 Bishkek	74 kg
Gold medal – first place	2023 Warsaw	74 kg
Silver medal – second place	2022 Rome	74 kg
Bronze medal – third place	2021 Nice	65 kg
U23 World Championships
Gold medal – first place	2019 Budapest	65 kg
World Juniors Championships
Bronze medal – third place	2021 Ufa	74 kg
Bronze medal – third place	2019 Tallinn	65 kg
European Juniors Championships
Gold medal – first place	2019 Pontevedra	65 kg
Gold medal – first place	2021 Dortmund	70 kg
Youth Olympic Games
Gold medal – first place	2018 Buenos Aires	65 kg
World Cadets Championships
Gold medal – first place	2018 Zagreb	65 kg
Silver medal – second place	2017 Athens	58 kg
European Cadets Championships
Gold medal – first place	2018 Skopje	65 kg
Bronze medal – third place	2017 Sarajevo	58 kg

Turan Bayramov (Azerbaijani: Turan Rövşən oğlu Bayramov; born 11 January 2001) is an Azerbaijani freestyle wrestler who competes at 70 kilograms, and 74 kilograms. Bayramov claimed a silver medal from the 2021 European Championships (70kg), was the 2019 U23 World Champion and the 2018 Cadet World and Youth Olympic Champion, as well as a medalist at multiple high level age-group competitions.

== Wrestling career ==
=== Age-group level ===
As a cadet, Bayramov placed third and second at the 2017 European and World Championships respectively. The following year, he was able to claim both championships and also became the Youth Olympic Champion. As a junior, he went on to win the European Championship but placed third at the World Championships in 2019. After a second-place finish at the Senior European Championships, Bayramov claimed the Junior European Continental championship in 2021.

=== Senior level ===
==== 2019–2020 ====
Bayramov made his international freestyle debut aged 18 at the 2019 U23 European Championships, where he lost his first match to place 11th. Despite his placement at the European Championships, Bayramov was able to claim the U23 World Championship after four victories, becoming a three–time non–senior World and Olympic Champion. In 2020, he placed third at the prestigious Yasar Dogu International.

==== 2021 ====
To start off the Olympic year, Bayramov placed third at the Grand Prix de France Henri Deglane, only losing to World Championship silver medalist from the United States James Green. A month later, he placed third at the Ukrainian Memorial, notably defeating US Open champion Joseph McKenna and Junior World Champion Erik Arushanian. In April, Bayramov moved up to 70 kilograms and claimed a silver medal from the European Championships, losing to Israil Kasumov in the finale.

On August 5, Bayramov moved up to 74 kilograms and competed at the Summer Olympics, where after a win over Vasyl Mykhailov from Ukraine, he was downed by two-time World Champion Frank Chamizo Italy to place eight. He was able to compete at the 2020 Summer Olympics as Khadzhimurad Gadzhiyev was not able to compete due to injury.

==== 2022 ====
He won the gold medal in his event at the Matteo Pellicone Ranking Series 2022 held in Rome, Italy. He competed in the 74 kg event at the 2022 World Wrestling Championships held in Belgrade, Serbia.

==== 2024 and match fixing scandal ====
He won one of the bronze medals in the men's 74 kg event at the 2024 European Wrestling Championships held in Bucharest, Romania.

He competed at the 2024 European Wrestling Olympic Qualification Tournament in Baku, Azerbaijan, and advanced to the semifinals, where he met two-time World champion Frank Chamizo. Chamizo stated that he was offered a $300,000 bribe to lose to Bayramov, which Chamizo refused. Several of Chamizo's takedowns were not counted by the referee and the match was tied 8-8 into the final seconds, when Chamizo scored a takedown and earned two points. However, the referee overturned the points after Bayramov's coach challenged. This decision was heavily criticized by the Italian Wrestling Federation and other observers, as Bayramov's knees clearly touched the mat. Although the match was tied, Bayramov was declared the winner on criteria, and consequently moved into the finals and qualified for the Olympics. Chamizo accused the referee of match fixing. Two weeks after the tournament, the refereeing body that officiated the match were suspended by the UWW after two independent panels ruled the bout was scored incorrectly. However, due to a policy the result could not be changed after the winner is officially declared.

=== 2026 ===
On April 25, 2026, at the European Wrestling Championship in Tirana, he defeated Georgian athlete Georgi Elbakidze with a score of 2:1 and advanced to the final, where he lost to Taimuraz Salmazanov (Slovakia) and won a silver medal.

== Freestyle record ==
International Senior Freestyle Matches
Res.	Record	Opponent	Score	Date	Event	Location
2020 Summer Olympics 8th at 74 kg
Loss	17–6	(Italy) Frank Chamizo	1–3	August 5, 2021	2020 Summer Olympics	Tokyo, Japan
Win	17–5	(Ukraine) Vasyl Mykhailov	4–2	August 5, 2021	2020 Summer Olympics	Tokyo, Japan
2021 European Championships (silver) at 70 kg
Loss	16–5	(Russia) Israil Kasumov	1–3	April 19–20, 2021	2021 European Continental Championships	Warsaw, Poland
Win	16–4	(Ukraine) Ihor Nykyforuk	5–0	April 19–20, 2021	2021 European Continental Championships	Warsaw, Poland
Win	15–4	(Turkey) Haydar Yavuz	INJ (3–2)	April 19–20, 2021	2021 European Continental Championships	Warsaw, Poland
Win	14–4	(United Kingdom) Nicolae Cojocaru	TF 10–0	April 19–20, 2021	2021 European Continental Championships	Warsaw, Poland
2021 Ukrainian Memorial International (bronze) at 65 kg
Win	13–4	(Ukraine) Erik Arushanian	3–0	February 26–28, 2021	XXIV Outstanding Ukrainian Wrestlers and Coaches Memorial	Kyiv, Ukraine
Loss	12–4	(Kyrgyzstan) Ernazar Akmataliev	7–13	February 26–28, 2021	XXIV Outstanding Ukrainian Wrestlers and Coaches Memorial	Kyiv, Ukraine
Win	12–3	(United States) Joseph McKenna	5–1	February 26–28, 2021	XXIV Outstanding Ukrainian Wrestlers and Coaches Memorial	Kyiv, Ukraine
Win	11–3	(Belarus) Andrei Bekreneu	TF 11–0	February 26–28, 2021	XXIV Outstanding Ukrainian Wrestlers and Coaches Memorial	Kyiv, Ukraine
Win	10–3	(Ukraine) Gor Ohannesian	Fall	February 26–28, 2021	XXIV Outstanding Ukrainian Wrestlers and Coaches Memorial	Kyiv, Ukraine
2021 Henri Deglane Grand Prix (bronze) at 65 kg
Win	9–3	(France) Ilman Mukhtarov	3–1	February 16–17, 2021	Grand Prix de France Henri Deglane 2021	Nice, France
Loss	8–3	(United States) James Green	0–2	February 16–17, 2021	Grand Prix de France Henri Deglane 2021	Nice, France
Win	8–2	(Moldova) Maxim Saculțan	TF	February 16–17, 2021	Grand Prix de France Henri Deglane 2021	Nice, France
Win	7–2	(France) Ilman Mukhtarov	5–0	February 16–17, 2021	Grand Prix de France Henri Deglane 2021	Nice, France
2020 Yaşar Dogu (bronze) at 65 kg
Win	6–2	(Turkey) Cengizhan Erdoğan	FF	January 10–12, 2020	2020 Yaşar Dogu International	Istanbul, Turkey
Win	5–2	(Turkey) Cavit Acar	TF	January 10–12, 2020	2020 Yaşar Dogu International	Istanbul, Turkey
Loss	4–2	(Georgia (country)) Edemi Bolkvadze	Fall	January 10–12, 2020	2020 Yaşar Dogu International	Istanbul, Turkey
2019 U23 World Championships (gold) at 65 kg
Win	4–1	(Japan) Takuma Taniyama	3–2	October 29–30, 2019	2019 U23 World Championships	Budapest, Hungary
Win	3–1	(France) Ilman Mukhtarov	2–1	October 29–30, 2019	2019 U23 World Championships	Budapest, Hungary
Win	2–1	(Moldova) Maxim Saculțan	3–0	October 29–30, 2019	2019 U23 World Championships	Budapest, Hungary
Win	1–1	(Canada) Chris McIsaac	3–1	October 29–30, 2019	2019 U23 World Championships	Budapest, Hungary
2019 U23 European Championships 11th at 65 kg
Loss	0–1	(Russia) Saiyn Kazyryk	7–8	March 4–10, 2019	2019 U23 European Continental Championships	Novi Sad, Serbia
