= Soner Demirtaş =

Turkish freestyle wrestler

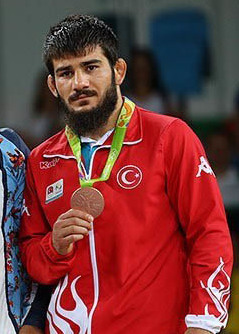
- Demirtaş at the 2016 Olympics

Personal information
- Nationality: Turkish
- Born: 25 June 1991 (age 35) Tokat, Turkey
- Home town: Istanbul, Turkey
- Education: Karamanoğlu Mehmetbey University
- Height: 172 cm (5 ft 8 in)
- Weight: 74 kg (163 lb)

Sport
- Country: Turkey
- Sport: Wrestling
- Event: Freestyle
- Club: Bueyueksehir Beledenyi; Ankara ASKI Sports Club
- Coached by: Adem Bereket
Medal record
Men's Freestyle wrestling
Representing Turkey
Olympic Games
Bronze medal – third place	2016 Rio de Janeiro	74 kg
World Championships
Bronze medal – third place	2017 Paris	74 kg
Bronze medal – third place	2022 Belgrade	74 kg
European Championships
Gold medal – first place	2016 Riga	74 kg
Gold medal – first place	2017 Novi Sad	74 kg
Gold medal – first place	2018 Kaspiysk	74 kg
Silver medal – second place	2024 Bucharest	74 kg
Bronze medal – third place	2014 Vantaa	74 kg
Bronze medal – third place	2020 Rome	74 kg
Bronze medal – third place	2023 Zagreb	74 kg
European Games
Silver medal – second place	2015 Baku	74 kg
Silver medal – second place	2019 Minsk	74 kg
Military World Games
Bronze medal – third place	2019 Wuhan	74 kg
Mediterranean Games
Gold medal – first place	2013 Mersin	74 kg
Islamic Solidarity Games
Silver medal – second place	2017 Baku	74 kg
Yasar Dogu Tournament
Gold medal – first place	2022 Istanbul	74 kg
Silver medal – second place	2012 Ankara	74 kg
Silver medal – second place	2013 Ankara	74 kg
Silver medal – second place	2015 Istanbul	74 kg
Bronze medal – third place	2014 Istanbul	74 kg
Bronze medal – third place	2016 Istanbul	74 kg
Dan Kolov - Nikola Petrov Tournament
Silver medal – second place	2018 Sofia	74 kg
Bronze medal – third place	2014 Sofia	74 kg
Grand Prix
Gold medal – first place	2013 Makhachkala	74 kg
Silver medal – second place	2014 Minsk	74 kg
Silver medal – second place	2020 Rome	74 kg
Bronze medal – third place	2012 Siedlce	74 kg
Bronze medal – third place	2016 Minsk	74 kg
Bronze medal – third place	2023 Alexandria	74 kg
World Juniors Championships
Silver medal – second place	2010 Budapest	74kg
European Juniors Championships
Silver medal – second place	2010 Samokov	74 kg

Soner Demirtaş (born 25 June 1991) is a Turkish freestyle wrestler who competes in the 74 kg division. He won the European title in 2016, 2017 and 2018. He was bronze medalist at the Rio Olympics. He is a member of the Ankara ASKI.

== Personal life ==
Soner Demirtaş was born to a butcher father as the third son of five in Çat village of Tokat on 25 June 1991. He is a student of physical education and sports at Karamanoğlu Mehmetbey University in Karaman. His three brothers are also sport wrestlers. He was inspired to take up wrestling by his eldest brother Bekir Demirtaş.

== Sports career ==
Demirtaş internationally debuted at the Freestyle Wrestling – Junior World Championships 2010 held in Budapest, Hungary, where he captured the silver medal.

He took part at the 2012 European Wrestling Championships in Belgrade, Serbia.

He participated at the 2013 European Championships in Tbilisi, Georgia. He won the gold medal at the 2013 Mediterranean Games in Mersin, Turkey. He lost to Belarusian Ali Shabanau in the round of 16 at the 2013 World Championships in Budapest, Hungary.

He won the bronze medal at the 2014 European Championships in Vantaa, Finland. Demirtaş lost to Jumber Kvelashvili of Georgia in the round of 32 at the 2014 World Championships in Tashkent, Uzbekistan.

He became silver medalist at the 2015 European Games in Baku, Azerbaijan. He lost to Narsingh Pancham Yadav from India in the round of 16 at the 2015 World Championships in Las Vegas, United States. Demirtaş became a second time European champion in 2017 at Novi Sad, Serbia.

In March 2021, he competed at the European Qualification Tournament in Budapest, Hungary hoping to qualify for the 2020 Summer Olympics in Tokyo, Japan.

In 2022, he won the gold medal in his event at the Yasar Dogu Tournament held in Istanbul, Turkey. He competed in the 74 kg event at the 2022 World Wrestling Championships held in Belgrade, Serbia.

In 2023, Soner Demirtaş, competing in the 2023 European Wrestling Championships freestyle 74 kilograms, defeated Azerbaijan's Dzhabrail Gadzhiev 5–4 in the repechage match. He won the bronze medal after his opponent Ali Pasha Umarpashaev, who competed for Bulgaria, did not compete due to injury.

He won the silver medal in the men's 74 kg event at the 2024 European Wrestling Championships held in Bucharest, Romania. He competed at the 2024 European Wrestling Olympic Qualification Tournament in Baku, Azerbaijan hoping to qualify for the 2024 Summer Olympics in Paris, France. He was eliminated in his second match and he did not qualify for the Olympics.
