= Kamil Rybicki =

Polish freestyle wrestler (born 1996)

Personal information
- Nationality: Polish
- Born: 4 September 1996 (age 29)
- Home town: Sochaczew, Poland
- Height: 173 cm (5 ft 8 in)

Sport
- Country: Poland
- Sport: Wrestling
- Weight class: 74 kg (163 lb)

Kamil Rybicki (born 4 September 1996) is a Polish wrestler. He competed in the men's freestyle 74 kg event at the 2020 Summer Olympics.

He competed in the men's 74 kg event at the 2019 World Wrestling Championships held in Nur-Sultan, Kazakhstan. He also competed in the men's 74 kg event at the 2021 European Wrestling Championships held in Warsaw, Poland and the 2021 World Wrestling Championships held in Oslo, Norway. He also competed in the men's 74 kg event at the 2022 European Wrestling Championships held in Budapest, Hungary.

He competed in the men's 74 kg event at the 2022 World Wrestling Championships held in Belgrade, Serbia.
