= 2011 World Wrestling Championships – Men's freestyle 74 kg =

Men's freestyle 74 kg at the 2011 World Championships
- Venue: Sinan Erdem Dome
- Dates: 18 September 2011
- Competitors: 45 from 45 nations

Medalists
gold medal	Jordan Burroughs	United States
silver medal	Sadegh Goudarzi	Iran
bronze medal	Ashraf Aliyev	Azerbaijan
bronze medal	Davit Khutsishvili	Georgia

The men's freestyle 74 kilograms is a competition featured at the 2011 World Wrestling Championships, and was held at the Sinan Erdem Dome in Istanbul, Turkey on 18 September 2011.

== Results ==
Legend

- F — Won by fall
- R — Retired

=== Finals ===
Semifinals				Final
Jordan Burroughs (USA)	0	5	3
Ashraf Aliyev (AZE)	2	4	0	Jordan Burroughs (USA)	3	4
Abdulkhakim Shapiyev (KAZ)	0	1	0	Sadegh Goudarzi (IRI)	2	1
Sadegh Goudarzi (IRI)	1	0	4

=== Top half ===
==== Section 1 ====
Round of 64

Round of 32
Jordan Burroughs (USA)	3	4
Dmytro Rochniak (UKR)	1	2
Denis Tsargush (RUS)	2	1
Pürevjavyn Önörbat (MGL)	0	0
Kiril Terziev (BUL)	7	1
Alberto Martínez (ESP)	0	0
Ricardo Roberty (VEN)	2	1
Pool Ambrocio (PER)	0	0

Round of 16
Jordan Burroughs (USA)	1	1	2
Denis Tsargush (RUS)	3	0	1
Kiril Terziev (BUL)	1	1	0
Ricardo Roberty (VEN)	0	2	1

Quarterfinals
Jordan Burroughs (USA)	2	1
Ricardo Roberty (VEN)	1	0

==== Section 2 ====
Round of 64

Round of 32
Yunierki Blanco (CUB)	2	2	1
Ryuta Takahashi (JPN)	2	0	0
Olegk Motsalin (GRE)	0	0
Musa Murtazaliev (ARM)	1	2
Marius Atofani (ROU)	0	2
Ashraf Aliyev (AZE)	2	3
Azat Donbaev (KGZ)	1	5
Daniel Malvino (BRA)	0	0

Round of 16
Yunierki Blanco (CUB)	1	0	1
Musa Murtazaliev (ARM)	0	1	1
Ashraf Aliyev (AZE)	1	2
Azat Donbaev (KGZ)	0	0

Quarterfinals
Musa Murtazaliev (ARM)	2	0
Ashraf Aliyev (AZE)	4	1

=== Bottom half ===
==== Section 3 ====
Round of 64
Azamat Sufiev (TJK)	0	0
Zhang Chongyao (CHN)	1	5
Andriy Shyyka (GER)	6	7
Philip Roberts (GBR)	0	0
Narsingh Yadav (IND)	2	0	1
Matt Gentry (CAN)	0	1	2
Luca Lampis (FRA)	0	0
Rashid Kurbanov (UZB)	1	3
Eduardo Valencia (MEX)	2	1
Batuhan Demirçin (TUR)	5	2

Round of 32
Gábor Hatos (HUN)	0	0
Abdulkhakim Shapiyev (KAZ)	1	1
Cấn Tất Dự (VIE)	0
Zhang Chongyao (CHN)	6^{F}
Andriy Shyyka (GER)	1	1	6
Matt Gentry (CAN)	2	1	0
Rashid Kurbanov (UZB)	2	1
Batuhan Demirçin (TUR)	0	0

Round of 16
Abdulkhakim Shapiyev (KAZ)	2	1
Zhang Chongyao (CHN)	0	0
Andriy Shyyka (GER)	0	2	0
Rashid Kurbanov (UZB)	2	0	2

Quarterfinals
Abdulkhakim Shapiyev (KAZ)	1	0	1
Rashid Kurbanov (UZB)	0	1	0

==== Section 4 ====
Round of 64
Alexandru Burcă (MDA)	7	3
Rosalio Medrano (COL)	0	2
Augusto Midana (GBS)	0	1
Sadegh Goudarzi (IRI)	1	2
Robert Ollé (SVK)	0	0
Murad Gaidarov (BLR)	6	3
Carmelo Lumia (ITA)	5	2
José Mercado (ECU)	0	1
Melchor Manibusan (GUM)	0	0
Lulzim Vrenezi (MKD)	1	7
Lee Yun-seok (KOR)	0	0
Krystian Brzozowski (POL)	3	3
Davit Khutsishvili (GEO)	5	1
Romeo Djoumessi (CMR)	0	0
Philipp Crepaz (AUT)	3	3
Richard Addinall (RSA)	0	2

Round of 32
Alexandru Burcă (MDA)	0	0
Sadegh Goudarzi (IRI)	3	2
Murad Gaidarov (BLR)	2	4
Carmelo Lumia (ITA)	1	0
Lulzim Vrenezi (MKD)	0	0
Krystian Brzozowski (POL)	5	3
Davit Khutsishvili (GEO)	1	2
Philipp Crepaz (AUT)	0	0

Round of 16
Sadegh Goudarzi (IRI)	3	1
Murad Gaidarov (BLR)	0	0
Krystian Brzozowski (POL)	0	1	0
Davit Khutsishvili (GEO)	1	0	3

Quarterfinals
Sadegh Goudarzi (IRI)	3	3
Davit Khutsishvili (GEO)	1	0

=== Repechage ===
Repechage round 1
Augusto Midana (GBS)	1	1
Alexandru Burcă (MDA)	0	0

Repechage round 2
Dmytro Rochniak (UKR)	0	2	0
Denis Tsargush (RUS)	2	0	1
Augusto Midana (GBS)	1	0	0
Murad Gaidarov (BLR)	0	3	1

Repechage round 3
Denis Tsargush (RUS)	0	1	0
Ricardo Roberty (VEN)	1	0	1
Murad Gaidarov (BLR)	1	1	R
Davit Khutsishvili (GEO)	0	3

Bronze medals
Ricardo Roberty (VEN)	2	0	0
Ashraf Aliyev (AZE)	0	2	1
Davit Khutsishvili (GEO)	1	1	2
Abdulkhakim Shapiyev (KAZ)	5	0	0
