= 2010 World Wrestling Championships – Men's freestyle 74 kg =

Men's freestyle 74 kg at the 2010 World Championships
- Venue: Olympic Stadium
- Dates: 12 September 2010
- Competitors: 35 from 35 nations

Medalists
gold medal	Denis Tsargush	Russia
silver medal	Sadegh Goudarzi	Iran
bronze medal	Gábor Hatos	Hungary
bronze medal	Abdulkhakim Shapiyev	Kazakhstan

The men's freestyle 74 kilograms is a competition featured at the 2010 World Wrestling Championships, and was held at the Olympic Stadium in Moscow, Russia on 12 September.

== Results ==
Legend

- F — Won by fall

=== Finals ===
Semifinals				Final
Gábor Hatos (HUN)	0	0
Denis Tsargush (RUS)	3	1		Denis Tsargush (RUS)	1	3
Iván Fundora (CUB)	1	3	0	Sadegh Goudarzi (IRI)	0	0
Sadegh Goudarzi (IRI)	2	1	4

=== Top half ===
==== Section 1 ====
Round of 64

Round of 32
Zhang Chongyao (CHN)	2	0	0
Augusto Midana (GBS)	0	1	4
Luca Lampis (FRA)	0	1	0
Kiril Terziev (BUL)	1	0	1
Batuhan Demirçin (TUR)	0	2
Gábor Hatos (HUN)	3	4
Katea Ueresi (SOL)	0	0
Aliaksandr Matyl (BLR)	3	7

Round of 16
Augusto Midana (GBS)	0
Kiril Terziev (BUL)	3^{F}
Gábor Hatos (HUN)	0	1	2
Aliaksandr Matyl (BLR)	1	0	0

Quarterfinals
Kiril Terziev (BUL)	1	0	0
Gábor Hatos (HUN)	0	1	3

==== Section 2 ====
Round of 64

Round of 32
Narsingh Yadav (IND)	2	1	4
Marco Riesen (SUI)	1	2	2
Richard Addinall (RSA)	0	0
Krystian Brzozowski (POL)	2	4
Lee Yun-seok (KOR)	6	3
Daniel Uthurburu (URU)	0	0
Denis Tsargush (RUS)	4^{F}
Roman Dermenji (MDA)	0

Round of 16
Narsingh Yadav (IND)	0	0
Krystian Brzozowski (POL)	4	2
Lee Yun-seok (KOR)	0	0
Denis Tsargush (RUS)	1	7

Quarterfinals
Krystian Brzozowski (POL)	0	0
Denis Tsargush (RUS)	1	1

=== Bottom half ===
==== Section 3 ====
Round of 64

Round of 32
Marius Atofani (ROU)	0	0
Iván Fundora (CUB)	1	1
Dušan Babrnák (SVK)	3	0
Chamsulvara Chamsulvarayev (AZE)	4	2
Ali Rakhmatov (TJK)	0	0
Olegk Motsalin (GRE)	4	6
Andriy Shyyka (GER)	2	2
Kazuyuki Nagashima (JPN)	0	0

Round of 16
Iván Fundora (CUB)	2	2
Chamsulvara Chamsulvarayev (AZE)	1	1
Olegk Motsalin (GRE)	0	1
Andriy Shyyka (GER)	1	3

Quarterfinals
Iván Fundora (CUB)	3	4
Andriy Shyyka (GER)	1	1

==== Section 4 ====
Round of 64
Suren Markosyan (ARM)	3	5
Philipp Crepaz (AUT)	0	0
Abdulkhakim Shapiyev (KAZ)	4	1
Travis Paulson (USA)	0	0
Myagmaryn Mendsaikhan (MGL)	3	7
Konstantin Ermakovich (AUS)	0	0

Round of 32
Gela Saghirashvili (GEO)	2	1	0
Matt Gentry (CAN)	1	1	2
Volodymyr Syrotyn (UKR)	2	6
Abdurauf Bazarbaev (UZB)	1	2
Sadegh Goudarzi (IRI)	1	2
Suren Markosyan (ARM)	0	1
Abdulkhakim Shapiyev (KAZ)	1	6
Myagmaryn Mendsaikhan (MGL)	0	0

Round of 16
Matt Gentry (CAN)	2	3
Volodymyr Syrotyn (UKR)	3	6
Sadegh Goudarzi (IRI)	2	2
Abdulkhakim Shapiyev (KAZ)	1	0

Quarterfinals
Volodymyr Syrotyn (UKR)	0	0
Sadegh Goudarzi (IRI)	2	2

=== Repechage ===
Repechage round 2
Roman Dermenji (MDA)	11	7
Lee Yun-seok (KOR)	5	2
Suren Markosyan (ARM)	0	0
Abdulkhakim Shapiyev (KAZ)	1	1

Repechage round 3
Roman Dermenji (MDA)	0	1
Krystian Brzozowski (POL)	2	3
Abdulkhakim Shapiyev (KAZ)	2	0	3
Volodymyr Syrotyn (UKR)	0	1	0

Bronze medals
Krystian Brzozowski (POL)	0	2
Gábor Hatos (HUN)	1	2
Abdulkhakim Shapiyev (KAZ)	1	0	1
Iván Fundora (CUB)	0	1	0
