= 2007 World Wrestling Championships – Men's freestyle 74 kg =

Men's freestyle 74 kg at the 2007 World Championships
- Venue: Heydar Aliyev Sports and Concert Complex
- Dates: 20 September 2007
- Competitors: 49 from 49 nations

Medalists
gold medal	Makhach Murtazaliev	Russia
silver medal	Ibragim Aldatov	Ukraine
bronze medal	Iván Fundora	Cuba
bronze medal	Chamsulvara Chamsulvarayev	Azerbaijan

The men's freestyle 74 kilograms is a competition featured at the 2007 World Wrestling Championships, and was held at the Heydar Aliyev Sports and Concert Complex in Baku, Azerbaijan on 20 September 2007.

== Results ==
Legend

- F — Won by fall

=== Finals ===
Semifinals				Final
Iván Fundora (CUB)	0	1
Ibragim Aldatov (UKR)	4	7		Ibragim Aldatov (UKR)	0	2
Makhach Murtazaliev (RUS)	1	1	3	Makhach Murtazaliev (RUS)	1	2
Joe Heskett (USA)	3	0	1

=== Top half ===
==== Section 1 ====
Round of 64

Round of 32
Andriy Shyyka (GER)	0	0
Soslan Tigiev (UZB)	1	2
Felipe Macedo (BRA)	0
Murad Gaidarov (BLR)	4^{F}
Enrique Cubas (PER)	0	0
Iván Fundora (CUB)	8	2
Richard Addinall (RSA)	1	0
Cho Byung-kwan (KOR)	2	8

Round of 16
Soslan Tigiev (UZB)	0	0
Murad Gaidarov (BLR)	1	1
Iván Fundora (CUB)	4	4
Cho Byung-kwan (KOR)	2	0

Quarterfinals
Murad Gaidarov (BLR)	1	1	0
Iván Fundora (CUB)	2	1	2

==== Section 2 ====
Round of 64
Salvatore Rinella (ITA)	0	0
Gheorghiță Ștefan (ROU)	3	1

Round of 32
Doudou Diop (SEN)	1	1
Miki Todorov (MKD)	3	1
Maamoun Al-Karrad (SYR)	0	0
Ibragim Aldatov (UKR)	6	6
Ahmet Gülhan (TUR)	1	1
Ruslan Kokaev (ARM)	0	0
Dumitru Socoliuc (ISR)	2	0	1
Gheorghiță Ștefan (ROU)	2	1	1

Round of 16
Miki Todorov (MKD)	0	0
Ibragim Aldatov (UKR)	6	7
Ahmet Gülhan (TUR)	0	2	0
Gheorghiță Ștefan (ROU)	1	0	1

Quarterfinals
Ibragim Aldatov (UKR)	6	5
Gheorghiță Ștefan (ROU)	0	1

=== Bottom half ===
==== Section 3 ====
Round of 64
Makhach Murtazaliev (RUS)	4	7
Jaime Espinal (PUR)	2	0
Krystian Brzozowski (POL)	0	1	3
Mihail Ganev (BUL)	3	0	2
Gela Saghirashvili (GEO)	3	6
Wissam Bassam (IRQ)	0	0
Semyon Semyonov (KAZ)	2	1
Matt Gentry (CAN)	3	4
Emzarios Bentinidis (GRE)	2	7
Eamonn Dorgan (IRL)	0	0
Carlos Domínguez (ESP)	0	0
Ali Abdo (AUS)	1	1
Chamsulvara Chamsulvarayev (AZE)	3	4^{F}
Raido Jalas (EST)	1	0
Alexandru Burcă (MDA)	1	0
Ramesh Kumar (IND)	3	2

Round of 32
Makhach Murtazaliev (RUS)	0	6	1
Krystian Brzozowski (POL)	1	2	0
Gela Saghirashvili (GEO)	6	0	1
Matt Gentry (CAN)	0	1	0
Emzarios Bentinidis (GRE)	3	2
Ali Abdo (AUS)	1	0
Chamsulvara Chamsulvarayev (AZE)	1	0	3
Ramesh Kumar (IND)	1	3	3

Round of 16
Makhach Murtazaliev (RUS)	2	1
Gela Saghirashvili (GEO)	1	0
Emzarios Bentinidis (GRE)	0	1
Chamsulvara Chamsulvarayev (AZE)	2	6

Quarterfinals
Makhach Murtazaliev (RUS)	1	5
Chamsulvara Chamsulvarayev (AZE)	0	2

==== Section 4 ====
Round of 64
Luca Lampis (FRA)	3^{F}
Yesid Meneses (COL)	0
Gábor Hatos (HUN)	7	6
Antans Azarevičs (LAT)	0	0
Dorjvaanchigiin Gombodorj (MGL)	1	2^{F}
Augusto Midana (GBS)	0	0
Alhassane Yattara (GUI)	0	0
Inal Dzagurov (SVK)	6	7
Lê Duy Hợi (VIE)	0	1
Talant Jekshenov (KGZ)	4	4^{F}
Ali Asghar Bazri (IRI)	7^{F}
Keitani Graham (FSM)	0
Joe Heskett (USA)	4	1
Wu Zijian (CHN)	3	0
Máximo Blanco (VEN)	0	0
Hiroki Kayamori (JPN)	1	1

Round of 32
Luca Lampis (FRA)	0	0
Gábor Hatos (HUN)	2	3^{F}
Dorjvaanchigiin Gombodorj (MGL)	1	2
Inal Dzagurov (SVK)	0	0
Talant Jekshenov (KGZ)	3	0	0
Ali Asghar Bazri (IRI)	2	3	4
Joe Heskett (USA)	1	6
Hiroki Kayamori (JPN)	0	0

Round of 16
Gábor Hatos (HUN)	1	1	1
Dorjvaanchigiin Gombodorj (MGL)	0	3	0
Ali Asghar Bazri (IRI)	0	4	0
Joe Heskett (USA)	4	0	2

Quarterfinals
Gábor Hatos (HUN)	0	5	1
Joe Heskett (USA)	1	0	1

=== Repechage ===
Repechage round 1
Jaime Espinal (PUR)	1	1	0
Krystian Brzozowski (POL)	0	3	1

Repechage round 2
Maamoun Al-Karrad (SYR)	0	7	3
Miki Todorov (MKD)	6	3	0
Krystian Brzozowski (POL)	0	0
Gela Saghirashvili (GEO)	3	1

Repechage round 3
Maamoun Al-Karrad (SYR)	1	1
Gheorghiță Ștefan (ROU)	1	1
Gela Saghirashvili (GEO)	3	0	1
Chamsulvara Chamsulvarayev (AZE)	1	1	1

Bronze medals
Gheorghiță Ștefan (ROU)	0	0
Iván Fundora (CUB)	3	3
Chamsulvara Chamsulvarayev (AZE)	2	3
Joe Heskett (USA)	0	1
