= 2009 World Wrestling Championships – Men's freestyle 74 kg =

Men's freestyle 74 kg at the 2009 World Championships
- Venue: Messecenter Herning
- Dates: 23 September 2009
- Competitors: 31 from 31 nations

Medalists
| gold medal | Denis Tsargush | Russia |
| silver medal | Chamsulvara Chamsulvarayev | Azerbaijan |
| bronze medal | Ramesh Kumar | India |
| bronze medal | Sadegh Goudarzi | Iran |

The men's freestyle 74 kilograms is a competition featured at the 2009 World Wrestling Championships, and was held at the Messecenter Herning exhibition center in Herning, Denmark on September 23.

This freestyle wrestling competition consists of a single-elimination tournament, with a repechage used to determine the winner of two bronze medals.

== Results ==
Legend

- F — Won by fall
- R — Retired

=== Final ===
| Final |
| Chamsulvara Chamsulvarayev (AZE) | 0 | 0 |
| Denis Tsargush (RUS) | 2 | 1 |

=== Top half ===
Round of 32
Alexandru Burcă (MDA) | 1 | 2
Ricardo Roberty (VEN) | 0 | 0
Jakub Kačeňák (SVK) | 0 | 0
Chamsulvara Chamsulvarayev (AZE) | 6 | 3
Apostolos Taskoudis (GRE) | 3 | 5 | 7
Evan MacDonald (CAN) | 5 | 0 | 6
Kazuyuki Nagashima (JPN) | 3 | 0 | 0
Kiril Terziev (BUL) | 1 | 2 | 2
Gela Saghirashvili (GEO) | 1 | 1 | 0
Suren Markosyan (ARM) | 1 | 1 | 2
László Szabolcs (ROU) | 1 | 0^{R}
Mike Grundy (GBR) | 0 | 2
Ramesh Kumar (IND) | 0 | 2 | 1
Dustin Schlatter (USA) | 1 | 0 | 1

Round of 16
Dorjvaanchigiin Gombodorj (MGL) | 2 | 2
Alexandru Burcă (MDA) | 6 | 3
Chamsulvara Chamsulvarayev (AZE) | 5 | 3
Apostolos Taskoudis (GRE) | 0 | 1
Kiril Terziev (BUL) | 3 | 5
Suren Markosyan (ARM) | 0 | 0
Mike Grundy (GBR) | 0 | 2
Ramesh Kumar (IND) | 1 | 3

Quarterfinals
Alexandru Burcă (MDA) | 0 | 0
Chamsulvara Chamsulvarayev (AZE) | 3 | 1
Kiril Terziev (BUL) | 0 | 3 | 1
Ramesh Kumar (IND) | 1 | 2 | 4

Semifinals
Chamsulvara Chamsulvarayev (AZE) | 3^{F}
Ramesh Kumar (IND) | 0

=== Bottom half ===
Round of 32
Andriy Shyyka (GER) | 4 | 4^{F}
Pedro Soto (PUR) | 1 | 0
Luca Lampis (FRA) | 3 | 0
Murad Gaidarov (BLR) | 5 | 4
Richard Addinall (RSA) | 1 | 0
Bi Shengfeng (CHN) | 2 | 4
Denis Tsargush (RUS) | 2 | 3
Ender Çoşkun (TUR) | 0 | 0
Gábor Hatos (HUN) | 0 | 2
Sadegh Goudarzi (IRI) | 1 | 4
Seifaddin Osmanov (KAZ) | 2 | 1 | 4
Krystian Brzozowski (POL) | 0 | 4 | 1
Giya Chykhladze (UKR) | 5 | 0 | 3
Iván Fundora (CUB) | 4 | 3 | 1
Cho Byung-kwan (KOR) | 0 | 3 | 1
Ilgiz Dzhakypbekov (KGZ) | 1 | 0 | 0

Round of 16
Andriy Shyyka (GER) | 1 | 1
Murad Gaidarov (BLR) | 1 | 1
Bi Shengfeng (CHN) | 1 | 0
Denis Tsargush (RUS) | 3 | 3
Sadegh Goudarzi (IRI) | 3 | 1
Seifaddin Osmanov (KAZ) | 0 | 0
Giya Chykhladze (UKR) | 0 | 1
Cho Byung-kwan (KOR) | 1 | 2

Quarterfinals
Murad Gaidarov (BLR) | 0 | 0
Denis Tsargush (RUS) | 1 | 1
Sadegh Goudarzi (IRI) | 1 | 0 | 3
Cho Byung-kwan (KOR) | 0 | 1 | 0

Semifinals
Denis Tsargush (RUS) | 1 | 1
Sadegh Goudarzi (IRI) | 0 | 1

=== Repechage ===
Repechage round 1
Jakub Kačeňák (SVK) | 0
Apostolos Taskoudis (GRE) | 6^{F}
Ender Çoşkun (TUR) | 2 | 0 | 2
Bi Shengfeng (CHN) | 1 | 2 | 3

Repechage round 2
Apostolos Taskoudis (GRE) | 0 | 0
Alexandru Burcă (MDA) | 1 | 3
Bi Shengfeng (CHN) | 0 | 0
Murad Gaidarov (BLR) | 6 | 6

Bronze medals
Alexandru Burcă (MDA) | 3 | 0 | 4
Ramesh Kumar (IND) | 0 | 2 | 5
Murad Gaidarov (BLR) | 0 | 0
Sadegh Goudarzi (IRI) | 1 | 3
