= Uzbekistan at the 2012 Summer Olympics =

- IOC code: UZB
- NOC: National Olympic Committee of the Republic of Uzbekistan
- Website: www.olympic.uz (in Uzbek and English)

in London
- Competitors: 54 in 13 sports
- Flag bearers: Elshod Rasulov (opening); Abbos Atoev (closing)
- Medals Ranked 75th: Gold 0 Silver 0 Bronze 3 Total 3

Summer Olympics appearances (overview)
- 1996; 2000; 2004; 2008; 2012; 2016; 2020; 2024

Other related appearances
- Russian Empire (1900–1912); Soviet Union (1952–1988); Unified Team (1992)

Uzbekistan competed at the 2012 Summer Olympics in London, from July 27 to August 12, 2012. This was the nation's fifth consecutive appearance at the Olympics. The National Olympic Committee of the Republic of Uzbekistan sent the nation's smallest delegation to the Games in the post-Soviet era. A total of 54 athletes, 36 men and 18 women, competed in 13 sports. There was only a single competitor in fencing, rhythmic and trampoline gymnastics, shooting and tennis.

Notable Uzbek athletes featured tennis player Denis Istomin (ranked thirty-fourth in the world by the Association of Tennis Professionals), road cyclist and former world junior champion Sergey Lagutin, and sprint canoer Vadim Menkov, who nearly missed out of the medal standings in Beijing. Sprinter Guzal Khubbiyeva and trampoline gymnast Ekaterina Khilko became the first Uzbek female athletes to compete in four Olympic games. Meanwhile, swimmers Ranohon Amanova and Yulduz Kuchkarova, both at age 18, were the youngest athletes of the team. Light heavyweight boxer and double Asian Games champion Elshod Rasulov was the nation's flag bearer at the opening ceremony.

Uzbekistan left London originally with four Olympic medals (one gold and three bronze), tying with Sydney for the nation's overall medal standings. Freestyle wrestler Artur Taymazov, who defended his super heavyweight title for the third time, became the most successful Uzbek athlete in history with a total of four Olympic medals. Another freestyle wrestler Soslan Tigiev collected his second Olympic medal in the men's middleweight division, by winning an Olympic bronze medal. Judoka Rishod Sobirov managed to repeat his bronze medal from Beijing. Boxer Abbos Atoev recaptured his nation's sporting success at these games, by winning an Olympic bronze medal after eight years.

On 7 November 2012, the International Olympic Committee stripped Soslan Tigiev of his bronze medal after testing positive for the prohibited substance methylhexaneamine. On 23 July 2019, the International Olympic Committee stripped Artur Taymazov of his gold medal after testing positive for the prohibited substance. In 2020, after the disqualification of a number of athletes in a weightlifting men's 105 kg event, the bronze medal in this event was redistributed to Ivan Efremov.

== Medalists ==
Medal	Name	Sport	Event	Date
Bronze	Rishod Sobirov	Judo	Men's 60 kg	28 July
Bronze	Abbos Atoev	Boxing	Men's middleweight	11 August
Bronze	Ivan Efremov	Weightlifting	Men's 105 kg	6 August
Bronze	Soslan Tigiev	Wrestling	Men's 74 kg	10 August
Gold	Artur Taymazov	Wrestling	Men's 120 kg	11 August

== Competitors ==
Sport	Men	Women	Total
Athletics	4	9	13
Boxing	6	0	6
Canoeing	1	1	2
Cycling	2	0	2
Fencing	1	0	1
Gymnastics	0	3	3
Judo	6	0	6
Shooting	0	1	1
Swimming	0	2	2
Taekwondo	2	1	3
Tennis	1	0	1
Weightlifting	5	1	6
Wrestling	8	0	8
Total	36	18	54

== Athletics ==
Uzbekistani athletes have so far achieved qualifying standards in the following athletics events (up to a maximum of 3 athletes in each event at the 'A' Standard, and 1 at the 'B' Standard):

Key

- Note – Ranks given for track events are within the athlete's heat only
- Q = Qualified for the next round
- q = Qualified for the next round as a fastest loser or, in field events, by position without achieving the qualifying target
- NR = National record
- N/A = Round not applicable for the event
- Bye = Athlete not required to compete in round

Men
Track & road events

Athlete	Event	Heat		Semifinal		Final	
Athlete	Event	Result	Rank	Result	Rank	Result	Rank
Artem Dyatlov	400 m hurdles	51.55	7	Did not advance			

Field events

Athlete	Event	Qualification		Final	
Athlete	Event	Distance	Position	Distance	Position
Suhrob Khodjaev	Hammer throw	65.88	38	Did not advance	
Ivan Zaytsev	Javelin throw	73.94	36	Did not advance	

Combined events – Decathlon

Athlete	Event	100 m	LJ	SP	HJ	400 m	110H	DT	PV	JT	1500 m	Final	Rank
Rifat Artikov	Result	11.37	6.41	14.11	1.93	51.91	14.74	43.53	4.40	56.62	5:09.52	7203	26
Rifat Artikov	Points	780	677	735	740	729	881	737	731	687	506	7203	26

Women
Track & road events

Athlete	Event	Heat		Quarterfinal		Semifinal		Final	
Athlete	Event	Result	Rank	Result	Rank	Result	Rank	Result	Rank
Nataliya Asanova	400 m hurdles	58.05	7	—N/a		Did not advance			
Guzal Khubbiyeva	100 m	Bye		11.22	4	Did not advance			

Field events

Athlete	Event	Qualification		Final	
Athlete	Event	Distance	Position	Distance	Position
Nadiya Dusanova	High jump	1.85	=20	Did not advance	
Anastasiya Juravleva	Triple jump	13.54	29	Did not advance	
Aleksandra Kotlyarova	Triple jump	13.55	28	Did not advance	
Svetlana Radzivil	High jump	1.96	1 Q	1.97	7
Elena Smolyanova	Shot put	14.43	30	Did not advance	
Anastasiya Svechnikova	Javelin throw	51.27	35	Did not advance	
Yuliya Tarasova	Long jump	NM	—	Did not advance	

== Boxing ==
Uzbekistan so far qualified boxers for the following events

Men

Athlete	Event	Round of 32	Round of 16	Quarterfinals	Semifinals	Final	
Athlete	Event	Opposition Result	Opposition Result	Opposition Result	Opposition Result	Opposition Result	Rank
Jasurbek Latipov	Flyweight	Bye	Abdelaal (EGY); W 21–11	Tögstsogt (MGL); L 10–15	Did not advance		
Orzubek Shayimov	Bantamweight	Vieira (BRA); L 7–13	Did not advance				
Fazliddin Gaibnazarov	Lightweight	Abdon (CMR); W 11–6	Ramírez (USA); W 15–11	Han S-C (KOR); L 13–16	Did not advance		
Uktamjon Rahmonov	Light welterweight	Rojas (ECU); W 16–10	Şener (TUR); W 16–8	Iglesias (CUB); L 15–21	Did not advance		
Abbos Atoev	Middleweight	Haddioui (MAR); W 11–9	Juratoni (ROU); W 12–10	Singh (IND); W 17–13	Murata (JPN); L 12–13	Did not advance	3rd place, bronze medalist(s)
Elshod Rasulov	Light heavyweight	Bye	El-Mekachari (TUN); W 13–6	Mekhontsev (RUS); L 15–19	Did not advance		

== Canoeing ==
=== Sprint ===
Uzbekistan qualified boats for the following events

Athlete	Event	Heats		Semifinals		Final	
Athlete	Event	Time	Rank	Time	Rank	Time	Rank
Vadim Menkov	Men's C-1 200 m	42.171	4 Q	42.944	6 FB	44.168	10
Vadim Menkov	Men's C-1 1000 m	4:05.895	2 Q	3:53.257	4 FA	3:49.255	4
Yuliya Borzova	Women's K-1 200 m	44.872	6 Q	44.426	8	Did not advance	
Yuliya Borzova	Women's K-1 500 m	2:03.893	6 Q	2:00.584	8	Did not advance	

Qualification Legend: FA = Qualify to final (medal); FB = Qualify to final B (non-medal)

== Cycling ==
=== Road ===
Athlete	Event	Time	Rank
Muradjan Halmuratov	Men's road race	Did not finish	
Sergey Lagutin	Men's road race	5:46:05	5

== Fencing ==
Uzbekistan qualified 1 fencer.

Men

Athlete	Event	Round of 32	Round of 16	Quarterfinal	Semifinal	Final / BM	
Athlete	Event	Opposition Score	Opposition Score	Opposition Score	Opposition Score	Opposition Score	Rank
Ruslan Kudayev	Individual épée	Park K-D (KOR); W 15–9	Fernández (VEN); L 3–15	Did not advance			

== Gymnastics ==
=== Artistic ===
Women

Athlete	Event	Qualification						Final					
Athlete	Event	Apparatus				Total	Rank	Apparatus				Total	Rank
Athlete	Event	F	V	UB	BB	Total	Rank	F	V	UB	BB	Total	Rank
Luiza Galiulina	All-around	Excluded (for doping test)*											

- Galiulina was initially suspended and later excluded from the games after testing positive for the banned diuretic drug furosemide.

=== Rhythmic ===
Athlete	Event	Qualification						Final					
Athlete	Event	Hoop	Ball	Clubs	Ribbon	Total	Rank	Hoop	Ball	Clubs	Ribbon	Total	Rank
Ulyana Trofimova	Individual	24.650	24.625	23.275	24.800	97.350	20	Did not advance					

=== Trampoline ===
Athlete	Event	Qualification		Final	
Athlete	Event	Score	Rank	Score	Rank
Ekaterina Khilko	Women's	99.290	12	Did not advance	

== Judo ==
Uzbekistan qualified 6 judokas. Abdullo Tangriev qualified in the men's +100 kg category, but withdrew from the Games.

Men

Athlete	Event	Round of 64	Round of 32	Round of 16	Quarterfinals	Semifinals	Repechage	Final / BM	
Athlete	Event	Opposition Result	Opposition Result	Opposition Result	Opposition Result	Opposition Result	Opposition Result	Opposition Result	Rank
Rishod Sobirov	−60 kg	Bye	Paischer (AUT); W 0210–0000	Guédez (VEN); W 1000–0000	Kitadai (BRA); W 0100–0001	Galstyan (RUS); L 0000–0011	Bye	Milous (FRA); W 0100–0003	3rd place, bronze medalist(s)
Mirzahid Farmonov	−66 kg	Bye	Elkawiseh (LBA); W 1011–0002	Cho J-H (KOR); L 0001–0011	Did not advance				
Navruz Jurakobilov	−73 kg	Dowabobo (NRU); W 0100–0001	Tritton (CAN); W 0002–0011	Boqiev (TJK); L 0001–1001	Did not advance				
Yakhyo Imamov	−81 kg	Bye	Kim J-b (KOR); L 0001–0001 YUS	Did not advance					
Dilshod Choriev	−90 kg	—N/a	Nyman (SWE); W 0101–0013	Madarász (HUN); W 1001–0001	Camilo (BRA); L 0001–0002	Did not advance	Nishiyama (JPN); L 0012–0012 YUS	Did not advance	7
Ramziddin Sayidov	−100 kg	—N/a	Vashkulat (USA); W 0100–0000	Despaigne (CUB); W 0102–010H	Naidangiin (MGL); L 0001–0100	Did not advance	Gasimov (AZE); W 1000–0000	Peters (GER); L 0010–0200	5

== Shooting ==
Women

Athlete	Event	Qualification		Final	
Athlete	Event	Points	Rank	Points	Rank
Sakina Mamedova	50 m rifle 3 positions	578	22	Did not advance	
Sakina Mamedova	10 m air rifle	389	49	Did not advance	

== Swimming ==
Uzbekistani swimmers have further achieved qualifying standards in the following events (up to a maximum of 2 swimmers in each event at the Olympic Qualifying Time (OQT), and potentially 1 at the Olympic Selection Time (OST)):

Women

Athlete	Event	Heat		Semifinal		Final	
Athlete	Event	Time	Rank	Time	Rank	Time	Rank
Ranohon Amanova	200 m individual medley	2:15.37	25	Did not advance			
Yulduz Kuchkarova	200 m backstroke	2:18.60	37	Did not advance			

== Taekwondo ==
Uzbekistan qualified the following quota places.

Athlete	Event	Round of 16	Quarterfinals	Semifinals	Repechage	Bronze Medal	Final	
Athlete	Event	Opposition Result	Opposition Result	Opposition Result	Opposition Result	Opposition Result	Opposition Result	Rank
Dmitriy Kim	Men's −68 kg	Silva (BRA); L 2–3 SDP	Did not advance					
Akmal Irgashev	Men's +80 kg	Keita (MLI); L 4–13	Did not advance					
Natalya Mamatova	Women's +67 kg	Graffe (FRA); L 9–17	Did not advance		Lee I-j (KOR); L 1–8	Did not advance		

== Tennis ==
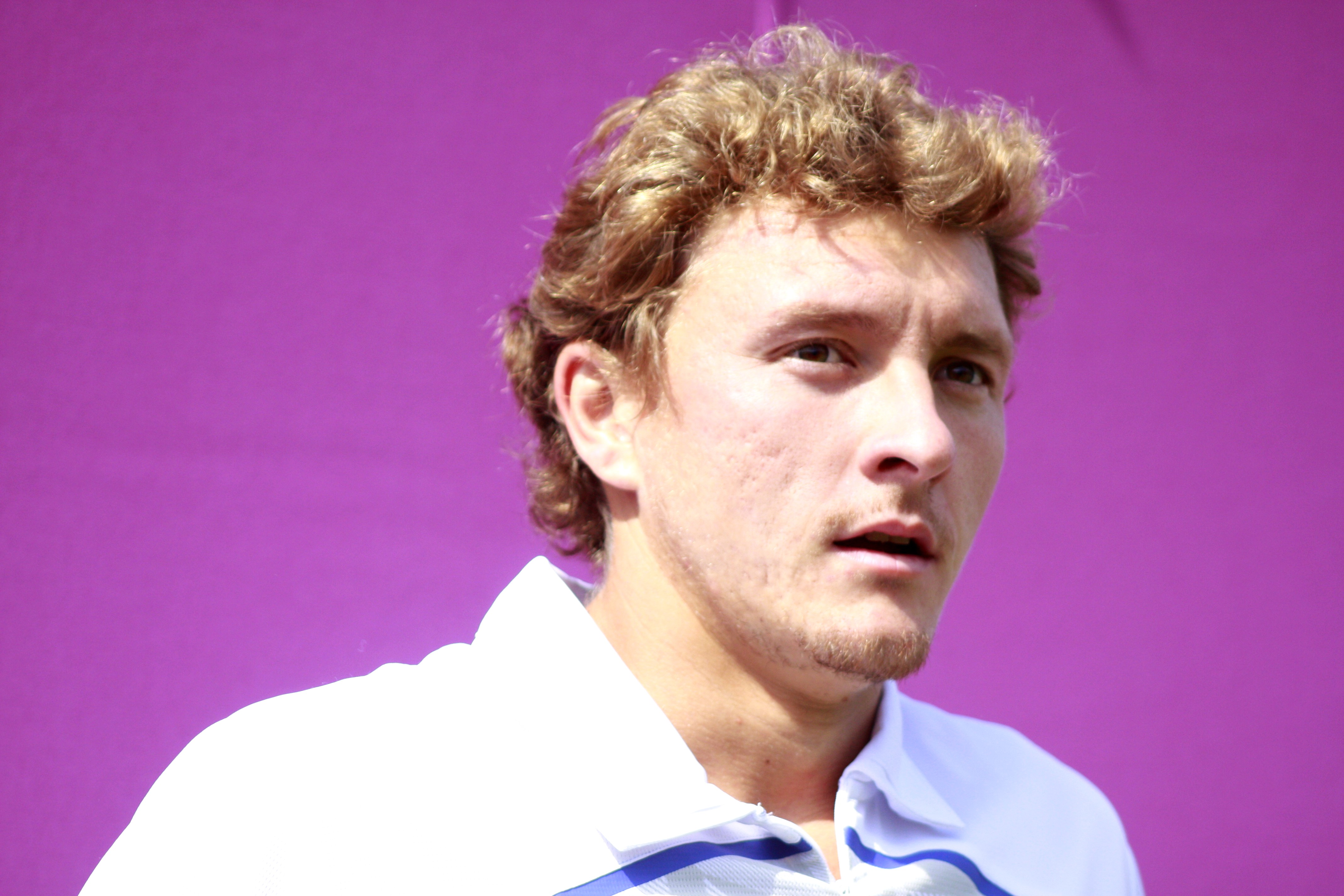
Denis Istomin in men's tennis singles.

Athlete	Event	Round of 64	Round of 32	Round of 16	Quarterfinals	Semifinals	Final / BM	
Athlete	Event	Opposition Score	Opposition Score	Opposition Score	Opposition Score	Opposition Score	Opposition Score	Rank
Denis Istomin	Men's singles	Verdasco (ESP); W 6–4, 7–6^{(11–9)}	Müller (LUX); W 6–7^{(4–7)}, 7–6^{(7–3)}, 7–5	Federer (SUI); L 5–7, 3–6	Did not advance			

== Weightlifting ==
Uzbekistan qualified 6 weightlifters.

Men

Athlete	Event	Snatch		Clean & Jerk		Total	Rank
Athlete	Event	Result	Rank	Result	Rank	Total	Rank
Ruslan Makarov	−56 kg	Did not compete					
Bahrom Mendibaev	−69 kg	~~135~~	DNF	—	—	—	DNF
Sherzodjon Yusupov	−85 kg	155	13	195	12	350	11
Ivan Efremov	−105 kg	183	6	218	=5	401	3rd place, bronze medalist(s)
Ruslan Nurudinov	−105 kg	184	=4	220	=3	404	DSQ

Women

Athlete	Event	Snatch		Clean & Jerk		Total	Rank
Athlete	Event	Result	Rank	Result	Rank	Total	Rank
Marina Sisoyeva	−48 kg	~~70~~	DNF	—	—	—	DNF

== Wrestling ==
Uzbekistan qualified 8 men.

Key

- VT - Victory by Fall.
- PP - Decision by Points - the loser with technical points.
- PO - Decision by Points - the loser without technical points.

Men's freestyle

Athlete	Event	Qualification	Round of 16	Quarterfinal	Semifinal	Repechage 1	Repechage 2	Final / BM	
Athlete	Event	Opposition Result	Opposition Result	Opposition Result	Opposition Result	Opposition Result	Opposition Result	Opposition Result	Rank
Dilshod Mansurov	−55 kg	Bye	Yang K-I (PRK); L 1–3 ^{PP}	Did not advance					14
Ikhtiyor Navruzov	−66 kg	Bye	Tushishvili (GEO); W 3–1 ^{PP}	Kumar (IND); L 1–3 ^{PP}	Did not advance	Bye	Şahin (TUR); L 1–3 ^{PP}	Did not advance	9
Soslan Tigiev	−74 kg	Bye	Motsalin (GRE); W 3–0 ^{PO}	Goudarzi (IRI); L 0–3 ^{PO}	Did not advance	Bye	Terziev (BUL); W 3–0 ^{PO}	Hatos (HUN); W 3–0 ^{PO}	DSQ
Zaurbek Sokhiev	−84 kg	Aldatov (UKR); L 1–3 ^{PP}	Did not advance						12
Kurban Kurbanov	−96 kg	Bye	Varner (USA); L 1–3 ^{PP}	Did not advance		Bye	Pliev (CAN); W 3–1 ^{PP}	Gogshelidze (GEO); L 1–3 ^{PP}	5
Artur Taymazov	−120 kg	Bye	Matuhin (GER); W 3–0 ^{PO}	Ghasemi (IRI); W 3–0 ^{PO}	Dlagnev (USA); W 5–0 ^{VT}	Bye		Modzmanashvili (GEO); W 3–0 ^{PO}	DSQ

Men's Greco-Roman

Athlete	Event	Qualification	Round of 16	Quarterfinal	Semifinal	Repechage 1	Repechage 2	Final / BM	
Athlete	Event	Opposition Result	Opposition Result	Opposition Result	Opposition Result	Opposition Result	Opposition Result	Opposition Result	Rank
Elmurat Tasmuradov	−55 kg	Bye	Módos (HUN); L 0–3 ^{PO}	Did not advance					16
Muminjon Abdullaev	−120 kg	Bye	Byers (USA); L 0–3 ^{PO}	Did not advance					15
