= 2014 World Wrestling Championships – Men's freestyle 74 kg =

Men's freestyle 74 kg at the 2014 World Championships
- Venue: Gymnastics Sport Palace
- Dates: 9 September 2014
- Competitors: 32 from 32 nations

Medalists
gold medal	Denis Tsargush	Russia
silver medal	Sosuke Takatani	Japan
bronze medal	Jordan Burroughs	United States
bronze medal	Liván López	Cuba

The men's freestyle 74 kilograms is a competition featured at the 2014 World Wrestling Championships, and was held in Tashkent, Uzbekistan on 9 September 2014.

This freestyle wrestling competition consists of a single-elimination tournament, with a repechage used to determine the winner of two bronze medals.

== Results ==
Legend

- D — Disqualified
- F — Won by fall

=== Final ===
Final
Denis Tsargush (RUS)	8
Sosuke Takatani (JPN)	2

=== Top half ===
Round of 32
Lin Zushen (CHN)	2
Lee Yun-seok (KOR)	4
Jordan Burroughs (USA)	4
Augusto Midana (GBS)	3
Ioannis Tserachidis (GRE)	6
Cristian Anguiano (MEX)	0
Rashid Kurbanov (UZB)	10
Alberto Martínez (ESP)	0
Henry Hidayat Azzhar (INA)	0
Zaur Efendiev (SRB)	8^{F}
Hanukh Rahamim (ISR)	0
Rustam Dudaiev (UKR)	13
Luca Lampis (FRA)	1
Denis Tsargush (RUS)	12
Innokenti Innokentev (KGZ)	3
Krystian Brzozowski (POL)	6

Round of 16
Lee Yun-seok (KOR)	2
Jordan Burroughs (USA)	13
Ioannis Tserachidis (GRE)	4
Rashid Kurbanov (UZB)	14
Zaur Efendiev (SRB)	1
Rustam Dudaiev (UKR)	3
Denis Tsargush (RUS)	10
Krystian Brzozowski (POL)	2

Quarterfinals
Jordan Burroughs (USA)	5
Rashid Kurbanov (UZB)	0
Rustam Dudaiev (UKR)	0
Denis Tsargush (RUS)	4

Semifinals
Jordan Burroughs (USA)	2
Denis Tsargush (RUS)	9

=== Bottom half ===
Round of 32
Galymzhan Usserbayev (KAZ)	7
Pürevjavyn Önörbat (MGL)	5
Jumber Kvelashvili (GEO)	4
Soner Demirtaş (TUR)	3
Gábor Hatos (HUN)	0
Reza Afzali (IRI)	5
Ashraf Aliyev (AZE)	11
Carmelo Lumia (ITA)	1
Balraj (IND)	0
Alexandru Burcă (MDA)	10
Murad Gaidarov (BLR)	12
Leonid Bazan (BUL)	5
Ramazan Kambarow (TKM)	0
Sosuke Takatani (JPN)	12
Liván López (CUB)	7
Andriy Shyyka (GER)	1

Round of 16
Galymzhan Usserbayev (KAZ)	1
Jumber Kvelashvili (GEO)	5
Reza Afzali (IRI)	4
Ashraf Aliyev (AZE)	6
Alexandru Burcă (MDA)	4
Murad Gaidarov (BLR)	7
Sosuke Takatani (JPN)	15
Liván López (CUB)	2

Quarterfinals
Jumber Kvelashvili (GEO)	9
Ashraf Aliyev (AZE)	5
Murad Gaidarov (BLR)	0
Sosuke Takatani (JPN)	3

Semifinals
Jumber Kvelashvili (GEO)	1
Sosuke Takatani (JPN)	3

=== Repechage ===
Repechage round 1
Luca Lampis (FRA)	1
Krystian Brzozowski (POL)	8
Ramazan Kambarow (TKM)	0
Liván López (CUB)	9

Repechage round 2
Krystian Brzozowski (POL)	3
Rustam Dudaiev (UKR)	6
Liván López (CUB)	8
Murad Gaidarov (BLR)	2^{D}

Bronze medals
Rustam Dudaiev (UKR)	2
Jordan Burroughs (USA)	8^{F}
Liván López (CUB)	11
Jumber Kvelashvili (GEO)	1
