= 2014 European Wrestling Championships – Men's freestyle 74 kg =

Wrestling competitions

The men's freestyle 74 kg is a competition featured at the 2014 European Wrestling Championships, and was held in Vantaa, Finland on April 3.

== Medalists ==
Gold	Aniuar Geduev; Russia
Silver	Jabrayil Hasanov; Azerbaijan
Bronze	Soner Demirtaş; Turkey
Bronze	Krystian Brzozowski; Poland

== Results ==
Legend

- F — Won by fall

=== Main bracket ===
Round of 16
Georg Harth (GER)	6
Soner Demirtaş (TUR)	6
Kiril Terziev (BUL)	10
Goran Atanasov (MKD)	0
Carmelo Lumia (ITA)	1
Stefan Reichmuth (SUI)	6
Jabrayil Hasanov (AZE)	10
Alberto Martínez-Abellán (ESP)	0
Ioannis Tserahidis (GRE)	0
Ali Shabanau (BLR)	11
Mihály Nagy (HUN)	1
Oleg Bilotserkivskyi (UKR)	12
Jakob Makarashvili (GEO)	2
Aniuar Geduev (RUS)	12
Evgheni Nedealco (MDA)	5
Krystian Brzozowski (POL)	16

Quarterfinals
Soner Demirtaş (TUR)	4
Kiril Terziev (BUL)	2
Stefan Reichmuth (SUI)	1
Jabrayil Hasanov (AZE)	11
Ali Shabanau (BLR)	4
Oleg Bilotserkivskyi (UKR)	0
Aniuar Geduev (RUS)	13
Krystian Brzozowski (POL)	4

Semifinals
Soner Demirtaş (TUR)	4
Jabrayil Hasanov (AZE)	2^{F}
Ali Shabanau (BLR)	4
Aniuar Geduev (RUS)	7

Final
Jabrayil Hasanov (AZE)	3
Aniuar Geduev (RUS)	5

=== Repechage ===
Repechage round 1
Alberto Martínez-Abellán (ESP)	6
Stefan Reichmuth (SUI)	17
Jakob Makarashvili (GEO)	4
Krystian Brzozowski (POL)	9

Bronze medals
Stefan Reichmuth (SUI)	0
Soner Demirtaş (TUR)	10
Krystian Brzozowski (POL)	4
Ali Shabanau (BLR)	4
