= Wrestling at the 2012 Summer Olympics – Men's freestyle 74 kg =

Men's freestyle 74 kg at the Games of the XXX Olympiad
- Venue: ExCeL London
- Date: 10 August 2012
- Competitors: 19 from 19 nations

Medalists
1st place, gold medalist(s)		Jordan Burroughs	United States
2nd place, silver medalist(s)		Sadegh Goudarzi	Iran
3rd place, bronze medalist(s)		Gábor Hatos	Hungary
3rd place, bronze medalist(s)		Denis Tsargush	Russia

Men's freestyle 74 kilograms competition at the 2012 Summer Olympics in London, United Kingdom, took place on 10 August at ExCeL London. This freestyle wrestling competition consisted of a single-elimination tournament, with a repechage used to determine the winners of two bronze medals. The two finalists faced off for gold and silver medals. Each wrestler who lost to one of the two finalists moved into the repechage, culminating in a pair of bronze medal matches featuring the semifinal losers each facing the remaining repechage opponent from their half of the bracket.

Each bout consisted of up to three rounds, lasting two minutes apiece. The wrestler who scored more points in each round was the winner of that round; the bout finished when one wrestler had won two rounds (and thus the match).

== Schedule ==
All times are British Summer Time (UTC+01:00)

Date	Time	Event
10 August 2012	13:00	Qualification rounds
10 August 2012	17:45	Repechage
10 August 2012	18:45	Finals

== Results ==
=== Final ===
Final
Sadegh Goudarzi (IRI)	0	0
Jordan Burroughs (USA)	1	1

=== Top half ===
Qualifications

1/8 finals
Olegk Motsalin (GRE)	0	0
Soslan Tigiev (UZB)	3	1
Sadegh Goudarzi (IRI)	5	3
Kiril Terziev (BUL)	0	1
Zhang Chongyao (CHN)	0	0
Gábor Hatos (HUN)	2	2
Abdulkhakim Shapiyev (KAZ)	5	1
Bilel Ouechtati (TUN)	3	0

1/4 finals
Soslan Tigiev (UZB)	0	1
Sadegh Goudarzi (IRI)	3	1
Gábor Hatos (HUN)	1	1
Abdulkhakim Shapiyev (KAZ)	0	0

Semifinals
Sadegh Goudarzi (IRI)	2	2
Gábor Hatos (HUN)	0	0

=== Bottom half ===
Qualifications
Ashraf Aliyev (AZE)	1	1
Sosuke Takatani (JPN)	0	0
Ricardo Roberty (VEN)	0	1	1
Augusto Midana (GBS)	1	0	2
Davit Khutsishvili (GEO)	1	2
Pürevjavyn Önörbat (MGL)	0	1

1/8 finals
Jordan Burroughs (USA)	4	6
Francisco Soler (PUR)	0	0
Matt Gentry (CAN)	3	1
Narsingh Yadav (IND)	0	1
Denis Tsargush (RUS)	0	1	1
Ashraf Aliyev (AZE)	1	0	0
Augusto Midana (GBS)	0	1	0
Davit Khutsishvili (GEO)	1	0	3

1/4 finals
Jordan Burroughs (USA)	2	1
Matt Gentry (CAN)	1	1
Denis Tsargush (RUS)	4	1
Davit Khutsishvili (GEO)	0	0

Semifinals
Jordan Burroughs (USA)	3	0	2
Denis Tsargush (RUS)	1	2	1

=== Repechage ===
Repechage round 2
Kiril Terziev (BUL)	0	0
Soslan Tigiev (UZB)	1	5
Francisco Soler (PUR)	0	0
Matt Gentry (CAN)	4	5

Bronze medals
Soslan Tigiev (UZB)	1	1
Gábor Hatos (HUN)	0	0
Matt Gentry (CAN)	0	0
Denis Tsargush (RUS)	1	2

== Final standing ==
Rank	Athlete
1st place, gold medalist(s)	Jordan Burroughs (USA)
2nd place, silver medalist(s)	Sadegh Goudarzi (IRI)
3rd place, bronze medalist(s)	Gábor Hatos (HUN)
3rd place, bronze medalist(s)	Denis Tsargush (RUS)
5	Matt Gentry (CAN)
6	Davit Khutsishvili (GEO)
7	Augusto Midana (GBS)
8	Ashraf Aliyev (AZE)
9	Abdulkhakim Shapiyev (KAZ)
10	Bilel Ouechtati (TUN)
11	Ricardo Roberty (VEN)
12	Pürevjavyn Önörbat (MGL)
13	Narsingh Yadav (IND)
14	Kiril Terziev (BUL)
15	Sosuke Takatani (JPN)
16	Olegk Motsalin (GRE)
16	Zhang Chongyao (CHN)
18	Francisco Soler (PUR)
DQ	Soslan Tigiev (UZB)

- Soslan Tigiev of Uzbekistan originally won the bronze medal, but was disqualified after he tested positive for Methylhexanamine.
