= Mike Grundy =

English mixed martial artist and wrestler

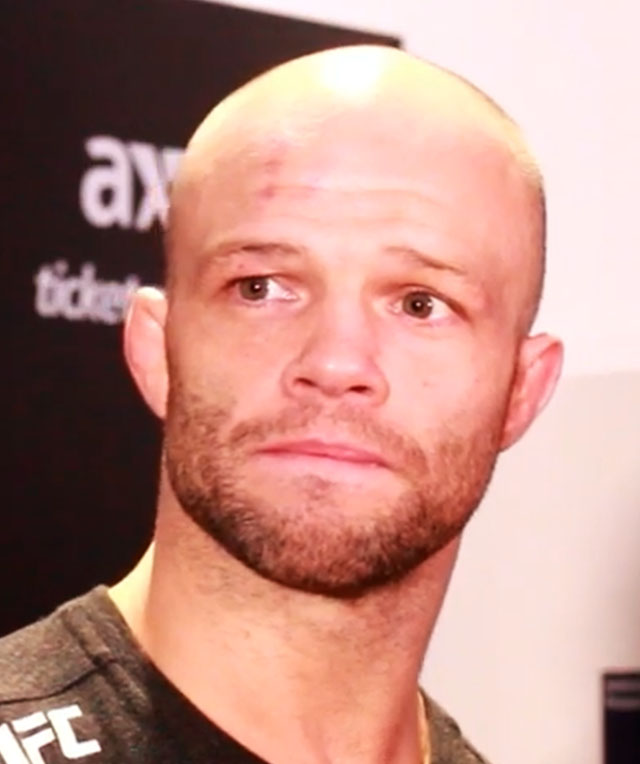
- Grundy at UFC Fight Night 147 in London
- Born: Michael Grundy; 1 March 1987 (age 39); Wigan, England
- Height: 5 ft 8 in (1.73 m)
- Weight: 145 lb (66 kg; 10 st 5 lb)
- Division: Featherweight (145 lbs) (2014–2022); Lightweight (155 lbs) (2015)
- Style: Wrestling
- Fighting out of: Liverpool, Merseyside, England
- Team: Team Kaobon Wigan (2007–present)
- Trainer: Colin Heron (Head coach); Marcelo Brigadeiro (Luta Livre); Shane Rigby (Wrestling); Andy Aspinall (Brazilian Jiu-Jitsu); Juddas Clottey (Boxing)
- Rank: Black belt in Luta Livre; Brown belt in Brazilian Jiu-Jitsu
- Wrestling: British national team for freestyle wrestling
- Years active: 2014–2022

Mixed martial arts record
- Total: 16
- Wins: 12
- By knockout: 1
- By submission: 8
- By decision: 3
- Losses: 4
- By submission: 2
- By decision: 2

Other information
- Mixed martial arts record from Sherdog

Michael Grundy (born 1 March 1987) is an English professional mixed martial artist and wrestler who competed in the Featherweight division of the Ultimate Fighting Championship (UFC). During his wrestling career, Grundy notably claimed a bronze medal at the 2014 Commonwealth Games.

== Wrestling career ==
Grundy started wrestling at a young age under the guidance of his father, at the Aspull Wrestling Club - popularly called The Snake Pit, under Roy Wood. He later trained with Wood's student Shane Rigby, a three-time Commonwealth medallist that learned catch wrestling from Wood. He also trains in luta livre, a submission wrestling style from Brazil, and has earned a black belt.

During his freestyle wrestling career, Grundy represented both England and Great Britain. He made two Junior World Teams and one Senior World Team while wrestling for England. Grundy wrestled for Great Britain in the men's freestyle 74 kg division at the 2009 World Wrestling Championships, where he went 1–1. Competing for England, he competed in the men's freestyle 74 kg event at the 2010 Commonwealth Games, where he finished 5th overall. In his last international wrestling event, Grundy also competed for England in the men's freestyle 74 kg event at the 2014 Commonwealth Games where he won a bronze medal, being the best achievement of his career.

=== Catch wrestling lineage ===
Billy Riley > Roy Wood > Shane Rigby > Mike Grundy

== Mixed martial arts career ==
=== Early career ===
His initial contact with mixed martial arts was when he helped Terry Etim during his fight camp in 2007. Gradually he picked up various disciplines and ultimately made his amateur mixed martial arts debut in 2011, followed by professional debut in September 2014. Over the next three years, Grundy competed for various promotions including Shooto, BAMMA, and Absolute Championship Berkut. He amassed a record of 11 wins against 1 loss before joining the UFC.

=== Ultimate Fighting Championship ===
Grundy made his debut on 16 March 2019 at UFC Fight Night: Till vs. Masvidal against Nad Narimani. He won the fight via technical knockout in the second round.

Grundy was scheduled to face Movsar Evloev on 31 August 2019 at UFC on ESPN+ 15. However, on 19 August it was reported that Grundy had pulled out from the event, citing injury.

Grundy was scheduled to face Makwan Amirkhani on 21 March 2020 at UFC Fight Night: Woodley vs. Edwards. However, the event was eventually postponed due to the COVID-19 pandemic.

Grundy faced Movsar Evloev on 26 July 2020 at UFC on ESPN 14. He lost the fight via unanimous decision.

Grundy was expected to face Nik Lentz on 16 January 2021 at UFC on ABC 1. However, a member of Grundy's team tested positive for COVID-19, hence Grundy was pulled from the fight.

Grundy faced Lando Vannata at UFC 262 on 15 May 2021. He lost the fight via split decision.

As the last fight of his prevailing contract, Grundy faced Makwan Amirkhani at UFC Fight Night 204 on 19 March 2022. The bout was originally scheduled to occur at UFC Fight Night: Woodley vs. Edwards. Grundy lost the fight via technical submission with an Anaconda choke in the first round.

In May 2022, it was reported that Grundy was released by the UFC.

On 27 April 2024, Grundy announced that he had retired from MMA.

=== Global Fight League ===
In January 2025, Grundy signed with the Global Fight League.

Grundy was scheduled to face Kai Kamaka III on 25 May 2025 at GFL 2. However, all GFL events were cancelled indefinitely.

== Submission grappling career ==
Grundy competed against Aljamain Sterling in the main event of Polaris 25 on 30 September 2023. He lost the match by decision.

== Personal life ==
Grundy has four siblings who all have wrestled to some extent. He has three sons, with the oldest also competing in MMA.

== Championships and accomplishments ==
=== Freestyle wrestling ===
==== Senior ====
- United World Wrestling (FILA)
  - 2014 Commonwealth Games - Bronze Medal - 74 kg
  - 2011 Grand Prix of Spain - 9th place - 74 kg
  - 2010 Commonwealth Games - 5th place - 74 kg
  - 2010 Great Britain Cup - 7th place - 74 kg
  - 2010 European Championship - 16th place - 74 kg
  - 2009 World Championship - 12th place - 74 kg
  - 2009 European Championship - 23rd place - 74 kg
  - 2008 2nd Olympic Qualification - 20th place - 74 kg
  - 2008 1st Olympic Qualification - 29th place - 74 kg
  - 2007 European Championship - 22nd place - 74 kg

=== Mixed martial arts ===
- Aspera Fighting Championship
  - Aspera FC Featherweight Championship (One time)

=== Brazilian Jiu-jitsu ===
- IBJJF European No-Gi Championships
  - 2015 European Championship First placer (lightweight, blue belt)

== Mixed martial arts record ==
Professional record breakdown
16 matches	12 wins	4 losses
By knockout	1	0
By submission	8	2
By decision	3	2

Res.	Record	Opponent	Method	Event	Date	Round	Time	Location	Notes
Loss	12–4	Makwan Amirkhani	Technical Submission (anaconda choke)	UFC Fight Night: Volkov vs. Aspinall	19 March 2022	1	0:57	London, England	
Loss	12–3	Lando Vannata	Decision (split)	UFC 262	15 May 2021	3	5:00	Houston, Texas, United States	
Loss	12–2	Movsar Evloev	Decision (unanimous)	UFC on ESPN: Whittaker vs. Till	26 July 2020	3	5:00	Abu Dhabi, United Arab Emirates	
Win	12–1	Nad Narimani	TKO (punches)	UFC Fight Night: Till vs. Masvidal	16 March 2019	2	4:42	London, England	
Win	11–1	Fernando Bruno	Decision (unanimous)	Aspera FC 58	4 November 2017	3	5:00	Gaspar, Brazil	Won the vacant Aspera FC Featherweight Championship.
Win	10–1	Michael Tobin	Submission (guillotine choke)	ACB 65: Silva vs. Agnaev	22 July 2017	3	4:38	Sheffield, England	
Win	9–1	Yutaka Saito	Decision (unanimous)	Professional Shooto 1/29	29 January 2017	3	5:00	Tokyo, Japan	
Win	8–1	Fouad Mesdari	Submission (arm-triangle choke)	Shinobi War 9	26 November 2016	1	2:39	Liverpool, England	
Win	7–1	Daniel Vasquez	Submission (arm-triangle choke)	ICE Fighting Championships 18	28 October 2016	1	1:15	Manchester, England	
Win	6–1	Zsolt Fényes	Submission (americana)	ICE Fighting Championships 17	20 August 2016	1	0:55	Manchester, England	
Win	5–1	Marley Swindells	Decision (unanimous)	BAMMA 25	14 May 2016	3	5:00	Birmingham, England	Return to Featherweight.
Win	4–1	Damian Frankiewicz	Submission (arm-triangle choke)	BAMMA 21	13 June 2015	1	3:59	Birmingham, England	Lightweight debut.
Loss	3–1	Damian Stasiak	Submission (triangle choke)	BAMMA 19	28 March 2015	2	4:18	Blackpool, England	
Win	3–0	Mamadou Gueye	Submission (Brabo choke)	BAMMA 18	21 February 2015	1	3:35	Wolverhampton, England	
Win	2–0	Mike Cutting	Submission (Brabo choke)	BAMMA 17	6 December 2014	1	1:56	Manchester, England	
Win	1–0	Ant Phillips	Submission (Brabo choke)	BAMMA 16	13 September 2014	1	2:47	Manchester, England	Featherweight debut.

== See also ==
- List of male mixed martial artists
