= 2015 World Wrestling Championships – Men's freestyle 74 kg =

Men's freestyle 74 kg at the 2015 World Championships
- Venue: Orleans Arena
- Dates: 12 September 2015
- Competitors: 42 from 42 nations

Medalists
gold medal	Jordan Burroughs	United States
silver medal	Pürevjavyn Önörbat	Mongolia
bronze medal	Narsingh Yadav	India
bronze medal	Aniuar Geduev	Russia

The men's freestyle 74 kilograms is a competition featured at the 2015 World Wrestling Championships, and was held in Las Vegas, United States on 12 September 2015.

== Results ==
Legend

- F — Won by fall
- WO — Won by walkover

=== Finals ===
Semifinals		Final
Pürevjavyn Önörbat (MGL)	4
Narsingh Yadav (IND)	4	Pürevjavyn Önörbat (MGL)	0
Aniuar Geduev (RUS)	3	Jordan Burroughs (USA)	10
Jordan Burroughs (USA)	4

=== Top half ===
==== Section 1 ====
Round of 64

Round of 32
Dan Pálinkás (SVK)	3
Cristian Sarco (VEN)	8
Pürevjavyn Önörbat (MGL)	7
Gong Buyng-min (KOR)	2
Zhang Chongyao (CHN)	0
Zelimkhan Khadjiev (FRA)	10
Georgios Savvoulidis (GRE)	10
Augusto Midana (GBS)	10

Round of 16
Cristian Sarco (VEN)	0
Pürevjavyn Önörbat (MGL)	10
Zelimkhan Khadjiev (FRA)	4^{F}
Augusto Midana (GBS)	0

Quarterfinals
Pürevjavyn Önörbat (MGL)	6
Zelimkhan Khadjiev (FRA)	4

==== Section 2 ====
Round of 64

Round of 32
Wilhelm Meyer (RSA)	0
Grigor Grigoryan (ARM)	10
Liván López (CUB)	16
Zhiger Zakirov (KAZ)	6
Hanoch Rachamin (ISR)	2
Narsingh Yadav (IND)	14
Soner Demirtaş (TUR)	11
Amirkhan Visalimov (AUT)	0

Round of 16
Grigor Grigoryan (ARM)	0
Liván López (CUB)	6
Narsingh Yadav (IND)	4
Soner Demirtaş (TUR)	3

Quarterfinals
Liván López (CUB)	5
Narsingh Yadav (IND)	16

=== Bottom half ===
==== Section 3 ====
Round of 64
Asnage Castelly (HAI)	0
Aniuar Geduev (RUS)	11
Francisco Soler (PUR)	0
Sosuke Takatani (JPN)	8^{F}

Round of 32
Rashid Kurbanov (UZB)	12
Talgat Ilyasov (AUS)	2
Martin Obst (GER)	0
Ali Shabanau (BLR)	2
Stefan Reichmuth (SUI)	0
Jabrayil Hasanov (AZE)	8
Aniuar Geduev (RUS)	11
Sosuke Takatani (JPN)	0

Round of 16
Rashid Kurbanov (UZB)	2
Ali Shabanau (BLR)	1
Jabrayil Hasanov (AZE)	0
Aniuar Geduev (RUS)	4

Quarterfinals
Rashid Kurbanov (UZB)	2
Aniuar Geduev (RUS)	6

==== Section 4 ====
Round of 64
Georgi Ivanov (BUL)	4
Jumber Kvelashvili (GEO)	5
Christian Anguiano (MEX)	5
Pedro Rocha (BRA)	2
Ishan Abeyrathna (SRI)	0
Evgheni Nedealco (MDA)	4^{F}
Alireza Ghasemi (IRI)	12
Carmelo Lumia (ITA)	1
Gurgen Baghdasarjan (CZE)	0
Mihály Nagy (HUN)	11
Narbek Izabekov (KGZ)
Azamat Sufiev (TJK)	WO
Jevon Balfour (CAN)	2
Oleg Zakharevych (UKR)	7
Jordan Burroughs (USA)	5
Krystian Brzozowski (POL)	2

Round of 32
Jumber Kvelashvili (GEO)	10
Christian Anguiano (MEX)	0
Evgheni Nedealco (MDA)	4
Alireza Ghasemi (IRI)	4
Mihály Nagy (HUN)	7
Azamat Sufiev (TJK)	2
Oleg Zakharevych (UKR)	0
Jordan Burroughs (USA)	10

Round of 16
Jumber Kvelashvili (GEO)	2
Alireza Ghasemi (IRI)	3
Mihály Nagy (HUN)	0
Jordan Burroughs (USA)	11

Quarterfinals
Alireza Ghasemi (IRI)	0
Jordan Burroughs (USA)	5

=== Repechage ===
Repechage round 1
Krystian Brzozowski (POL)	8
Oleg Zakharevych (UKR)	0

Repechage round 2
Gong Buyng-min (KOR)	7
Cristian Sarco (VEN)	5
Krystian Brzozowski (POL)	5
Mihály Nagy (HUN)	2

Repechage round 3
Gong Buyng-min (KOR)	2
Zelimkhan Khadjiev (FRA)	10
Krystian Brzozowski (POL)	3
Alireza Ghasemi (IRI)	8

Bronze medals
Zelimkhan Khadjiev (FRA)	12
Narsingh Yadav (IND)	8^{F}
Alireza Ghasemi (IRI)	0
Aniuar Geduev (RUS)	8
