= Pool Ambrocio =

Peruvian freestyle wrestler (born 1990)

Personal information
- Full name: Pool Edison Ambrocio Greifo
- Born: 4 December 1990 (age 35)
- Height: 173 cm (5 ft 8 in)

Sport
- Country: Peru
- Sport: Amateur wrestling
- Weight class: 86 kg
- Events: Freestyle; Greco-Roman wrestling
Medal record
Representing Peru
Men's freestyle wrestling
Pan American Championships
Silver medal – second place	2020 Ottawa	86 kg
Bronze medal – third place	2018 Lima	86 kg
South American Games
Silver medal – second place	2014 Santiago	86 kg
Silver medal – second place	2018 Cochabamba	86 kg
Men's Greco-Roman wrestling
South American Games
Silver medal – second place	2022 Asunción	87 kg
Bolivarian Games
Bronze medal – third place	2022 Valledupar	87 kg

Pool Edison Ambrocio Greifo (born 4 December 1990) is a Peruvian wrestler. In March 2020, he won the silver medal in the freestyle 86 kg event at the 2020 Pan American Wrestling Championships held in Ottawa, Canada.

== Career ==
In 2011, Ambrocio competed in the men's freestyle 74 kg event at the World Wrestling Championships held in Istanbul, Turkey. He was eliminated in his first match by Ricardo Roberty of Venezuela. In the same year, he also represented Peru at the 2011 Pan American Games in the men's freestyle 74 kg event. He was eliminated in his first match by Matt Gentry of Canada. Gentry went on to win one of the bronze medals.

In March 2020, Ambrocio qualified to represent Peru at the 2020 Summer Olympics in Tokyo, Japan at the Pan American Wrestling Olympic Qualification Tournament held in Ottawa, Canada. In the same year, he competed in the men's 86 kg event at the 2020 Individual Wrestling World Cup held in Belgrade, Serbia. In 2021, he competed in the men's 86 kg event at the 2020 Summer Olympics.

Ambrocio won the bronze medal in his event at the 2022 Bolivarian Games held in Valledupar, Colombia. He won the silver medal in his event at the 2022 South American Games held in Asunción, Paraguay.

In 2024, Ambrocio competed at the Pan American Wrestling Olympic Qualification Tournament held in Acapulco, Mexico hoping to qualify for the 2024 Summer Olympics in Paris, France. He was eliminated in his second match. Ambrocio also competed at the 2024 World Wrestling Olympic Qualification Tournament held in Istanbul, Turkey without qualifying for the Olympics.

== Achievements ==
Year	Tournament	Location	Result	Event
2008	Pan American Championships	Colorado Springs, United States	5th	Freestyle 66 kg
2010	Pan American Championships	Monterrey, Mexico	5th	Freestyle 84 kg
2011	Pan American Championships	Rionegro, Colombia	3rd	Freestyle 74 kg
2011	World Championships	Istanbul, Turkey	33rd	Freestyle 74 kg
2011	Pan American Games	Guadalajara, Mexico	8th	Freestyle 74 kg
2012	Pan American Championships	Colorado Springs, United States	5th	Freestyle 74 kg
2012	South American Championships	Callao, Peru	1st	Freestyle 74 kg
2013	Pan American Championships	Panama City, Panama	5th	Freestyle 84 kg
2013	South American Championships	Santiago de Chile, Chile	3rd	Freestyle 74 kg
2013	Bolivarian Games	Trujillo, Peru	2nd	Freestyle 84 kg
2014	South American Games	Santiago de Chile, Chile	2nd	Freestyle 86 kg
2014	Pan American Championships	Mexico City, Mexico	3rd	Freestyle 86 kg
2014	South American Championships	Callao, Peru	1st	Freestyle 86 kg
2014	South American Championships	Callao, Peru	2nd	Greco-Roman 85 kg
2015	World Championships	Las Vegas, United States	38th	Freestyle 86 kg
2015	South American Championships	Buenos Aires, Argentina	1st	Freestyle 86 kg
2016	Pan American Championships	Frisco, United States	2nd	Freestyle 86 kg
2017	Pan American Championships	Lauro de Freitas, Brazil	5th	Freestyle 86 kg
2017	World Championships	Paris, France	30th	Freestyle 86 kg
2017	South American Championships	Rio de Janeiro, Brazil	1st	Freestyle 86 kg
2018	Pan American Championships	Lima, Peru	3rd	Freestyle 86 kg
2018	South American Games	Cochabamba, Bolivia	2nd	Freestyle 86 kg
2018	World Championships	Budapest, Hungary	27th	Freestyle 86 kg
2019	Pan American Championships	Buenos Aires, Argentina	8th	Freestyle 86 kg
2019	Pan American Games	Lima, Peru	7th	Freestyle 86 kg
2019	World Championships	Nur-Sultan, Kazakhstan	19th	Freestyle 86 kg
2019	South American Championships	Santiago de Chile, Chile	1st	Freestyle 86 kg
2020	Pan American Championships	Ottawa, Canada	2nd	Freestyle 86 kg
2022	Bolivarian Games	Valledupar, Colombia	3rd	Greco-Roman 87 kg
2022	South American Games	Asunción, Paraguay	2nd	Greco-Roman 87 kg
