= Russian National Freestyle 2016 – Men's freestyle 74 kg =

The men's freestyle 74 kg is a competition featured at the 2016 Russian National Freestyle Wrestling Championships, and was held in Yakutsk, Russia on May 27.

== Medalists ==
Gold	(Kabardino-Balkaria) Aniuar Geduev
Silver	(Moscow Oblast) Denis Tsargush
Bronze	(North Ossetia–Alania) Atsamaz Sanakoev
Bronze	(Karachay-Cherkessia) Khusey Suyunchev

== Results ==
Legend

- F — Won by fall
- WO — Won by walkover

=== Finals ===
Final
(Kabardino-Balkaria) Aniuar Geduev	5
(Moscow Oblast) Denis Tsargush	2

=== Top half ===
Round of 32
(North Ossetia–Alania) Zaur Makiev	11
(Dagestan) Yakub Shikhdzhamal	8
(Kabardino-Balkaria) Martin Kashirgov	4
(Dagestan) Akhmed Gadzhimagomedov	6

Round of 16
(Moscow) Tazhutin Akaev	3
(Dagestan) Khabib Batyrov	0
(Kabardino-Balkaria) Aniuar Geduev	10
(Moscow Oblast) Edward Verobyan	0
(Tatarstan) Evgeny Lapshov	0
(Karachay-Cherkessia) Khusey Suyunchev	3
(North Ossetia–Alania) Zaur Makiev	9
(Dagestan) Akhmed Gadzhimagomedov	10

Quarterfinals
(Moscow) Tazhutin Akaev	0
(Kabardino-Balkaria) Aniuar Geduev	4
(Karachay-Cherkessia) Khusey Suyunchev	5
(Dagestan) Akhmed Gadzhimagomedov	1

Semifinals
(Kabardino-Balkaria) Aniuar Geduev	WO
(Karachay-Cherkessia) Khusey Suyunchev

=== Bottom half ===
Round of 32
(Chechnya) Musa Baziev	10
(Saint Petersburg) Gadzhi Daudov	0
(North Ossetia–Alania) Stanislav Khachirov	0
(North Ossetia–Alania) Atsamaz Sanakoev	2
(Dagestan) Gadzhi Nabiev	3
(Kabardino-Balkaria) Artem Umarov	2
(Yakutia) Sergey Semenov	0
(Dagestan) Adam Khasiev	12
(North Ossetia–Alania) Kakhaber Khubezhty	7
(Dagestan) Omarskhab Nazhmudinov	2
(Leningrad Oblast) Magomedgadzhi Imanshapiev	0
(Moscow Oblast) Denis Tsargush	9
(Dagestan) Magomed Khizriev	5
(Moscow Oblast) Magomed Mutalibov	2
(North Ossetia–Alania) Khetag Tsabolov	1
(Buryatia) Arsalan Budazhapov	6

Round of 16
(Chechnya) Musa Baziev	0
(North Ossetia–Alania) Atsamaz Sanakoev	5
(Dagestan) Gadzhi Nabiev	5
(Dagestan) Adam Khasiev	0
(North Ossetia–Alania) Kakhaber Khubezhty	0
(Moscow Oblast) Denis Tsargush	4
(Dagestan) Magomed Khizriev	4
(Buryatia) Arsalan Budazhapov	15

Quarterfinals
(North Ossetia–Alania) Atsamaz Sanakoev	WO
(Dagestan) Gadzhi Nabiev
(Moscow Oblast) Denis Tsargush	3
(Buryatia) Arsalan Budazhapov	2

Semifinals
(North Ossetia–Alania) Atsamaz Sanakoev	1
(Moscow Oblast) Denis Tsargush	7

=== Repechage ===
Repechage round 1
(Leningrad Oblast) Magomedgadzhi Imanshapiev	3
(North Ossetia–Alania) Kakhaber Khubezhty	12

Repechage round 2
(Moscow Oblast) Edward Verobyan	2
(Moscow) Tazhutin Akaev	5
(North Ossetia–Alania) Kakhaber Khubezhty	9
(Buryatia) Arsalan Budazhapov	8

Bronze medals
(Moscow) Tazhutin Akaev	0
(Karachay-Cherkessia) Khusey Suyunchev	4
(North Ossetia–Alania) Kakhaber Khubezhty	5
(North Ossetia–Alania) Atsamaz Sanakoev	6
