= Davit Khutsishvili =

Georgian freestyle wrestler

Personal information
- Native name: დავით ხუციშვილი
- Nationality: Georgia
- Born: Davit Khutsishvili; 19 October 1990 (age 35) Sagarejo, Georgian SSR, Soviet Union
- Height: 172 cm (5 ft 8 in)
- Weight: 80 kg (176 lb)

Sport
- Country: Georgia
- Sport: Amateur wrestling
- Weight class: 74 kg
- Event: Freestyle wrestling
Medal record
Representing Georgia
Men's freestyle wrestling
World Championships
Bronze medal – third place	2011 Istanbul	74 kg
European Championships
Silver medal – second place	2012 Belgrade	74 kg
Bronze medal – third place	2011 Dortmund	74 kg
Men's beach wrestling
World Beach Games
Gold medal – first place	2019 Doha	80 kg

Davit Khutsishvili (born 19 October 1990, in Sagarejo) is a Georgian freestyle wrestler. He competed in the freestyle 74 kg event at the 2012 Summer Olympics; after defeating Pürevjavyn Önörbat in the qualifications and Augusto Midana in the 1/8 finals, he was eliminated by Denis Tsargush in the quarterfinals.
