= Wrestling at the 2008 Summer Olympics – Men's freestyle 74 kg =

Men's freestyle 74 kg at the Games of the XXIX Olympiad
- Venue: China Agricultural University Gymnasium
- Date: 20 August 2008
- Competitors: 21 from 21 nations

Medalists
1st place, gold medalist(s)		Buvaisar Saitiev	Russia
2nd place, silver medalist(s)		Murad Gaidarov	Belarus
3rd place, bronze medalist(s)		Gheorghiță Ștefan	Romania
3rd place, bronze medalist(s)		Kiril Terziev	Bulgaria

Men's freestyle 74 kilograms competition at the 2008 Summer Olympics in Beijing, China, was held on August 20 at the China Agricultural University Gymnasium.

This freestyle wrestling competition consisted of a single-elimination tournament, with a repechage used to determine the winner of two bronze medals. The two finalists faced off for gold and silver medals. Each wrestler who lost to one of the two finalists moved into the repechage, culminating in a pair of bronze medal matches featuring the semifinal losers each facing the remaining repechage opponent from their half of the bracket.

Each bout consisted of up to three rounds, lasting two minutes apiece. The wrestler who scored more points in each round was the winner of that rounds; the bout finished when one wrestler had won two rounds (and thus the match).

== Schedule ==
All times are China Standard Time (UTC+08:00)

Date	Time	Event
20 August 2008	09:30	Qualification rounds
20 August 2008	16:00	Repechage
20 August 2008	17:00	Finals

== Results ==
Legend

- F — Won by fall

=== Final ===
Final
Soslan Tigiev (UZB)	1	0	1
Buvaisar Saitiev (RUS)	0	1	3

=== Top half ===
Qualifications

1/8 finals
Gela Saghirashvili (GEO)	1	2
Augusto Midana (GBS)	0	1
Murad Gaidarov (BLR)	0	2	1
Chamsulvara Chamsulvarayev (AZE)	4	0	0
Gheorghiță Ștefan (ROU)	0	0
Soslan Tigiev (UZB)	1	1
Emzarios Bentinidis (GRE)	0	2	2
Matt Gentry (CAN)	1	0	0

Quarterfinals
Gela Saghirashvili (GEO)	0	0
Murad Gaidarov (BLR)	1	1
Soslan Tigiev (UZB)	1	1
Emzarios Bentinidis (GRE)	0	0

Semifinals
Murad Gaidarov (BLR)	0	0
Soslan Tigiev (UZB)	1	1

=== Bottom half ===
Qualifications
Arsen Gitinov (KGZ)	1	3	1
Krystian Brzozowski (POL)	1	1	0
Ben Askren (USA)	0	4^{F}
István Veréb (HUN)	2	0
Siriguleng (CHN)	5	2
Iván Fundora (CUB)	7	4
Ali Abdo (AUS)	0	0
Ahmet Gülhan (TUR)	1	2
Buvaisar Saitiev (RUS)	1	7
Cho Byung-kwan (KOR)	0	2

1/8 finals
Kiril Terziev (BUL)	3	3
Meisam Mostafa-Jokar (IRI)	0	1
Ibragim Aldatov (UKR)	3	1	1
Arsen Gitinov (KGZ)	0	2	2
Ben Askren (USA)	1	0
Iván Fundora (CUB)	3	4
Ahmet Gülhan (TUR)	0	0
Buvaisar Saitiev (RUS)	1	4

Quarterfinals
Kiril Terziev (BUL)	6	9^{F}
Arsen Gitinov (KGZ)	6	1
Iván Fundora (CUB)	0	1
Buvaisar Saitiev (RUS)	2	2

Semifinals
Kiril Terziev (BUL)	0
Buvaisar Saitiev (RUS)	8^{F}

=== Repechage ===
Repechage round 1
Cho Byung-kwan (KOR)	1	0	2
Ahmet Gülhan (TUR)	0	2	1

Repechage round 2
Gheorghiță Ștefan (ROU)	0	1	1
Emzarios Bentinidis (GRE)	3	0	0
Cho Byung-kwan (KOR)	0	0
Iván Fundora (CUB)	2	4

Bronze medals
Gheorghiță Ștefan (ROU)	1	1
Murad Gaidarov (BLR)	2	3
Iván Fundora (CUB)	5	3
Kiril Terziev (BUL)	6	5^{F}

== Final standing ==
Rank	Athlete
1st place, gold medalist(s)	Buvaisar Saitiev (RUS)
2nd place, silver medalist(s)	Murad Gaidarov (BLR)
3rd place, bronze medalist(s)	Gheorghiță Ștefan (ROU)
3rd place, bronze medalist(s)	Kiril Terziev (BUL)
5	Iván Fundora (CUB)
6	Ben Askren (USA)
7	Arsen Gitinov (KGZ)
8	Emzarios Bentinidis (GRE)
9	Ahmet Gülhan (TUR)
10	Cho Byung-kwan (KOR)
11	Gela Saghirashvili (GEO)
12	Siriguleng (CHN)
13	Ibragim Aldatov (UKR)
14	Chamsulvara Chamsulvarayev (AZE)
15	Krystian Brzozowski (POL)
16	Augusto Midana (GBS)
17	Matt Gentry (CAN)
18	Meisam Mostafa-Jokar (IRI)
19	István Veréb (HUN)
20	Ali Abdo (AUS)
DQ	Soslan Tigiev (UZB)

- Soslan Tigiev of Uzbekistan originally won the silver medal, but he was disqualified in November 2016 after a retest of his sample tested positive for anabolic steroids.
