= 2009 Asian Wrestling Championships =

- Host city: Pattaya, Thailand
- Dates: 2–7 May 2009
- Stadium: Ambassador City Jomtien

Champions
- Freestyle: Iran
- Greco-Roman: Iran
- Women: China

The 2009 Asian Wrestling Championships were held in Pattaya, Thailand. The event took place from May 2 to May 7, 2009.

== Medal table ==
Rank	Nation	Gold	Silver	Bronze	Total
1	Iran	9	0	3	12
2	Japan	4	2	5	11
3	Kazakhstan	3	5	5	13
4	China	3	3	5	11
5	South Korea	1	4	4	9
6	North Korea	1	2	4	7
7	India	0	2	4	6
8	Mongolia	0	2	3	5
9	Thailand	0	1	0	1
10	Kyrgyzstan	0	0	4	4
11	Vietnam	0	0	2	2
12	Chinese Taipei	0	0	1	1
12	Iraq	0	0	1	1
12	Jordan	0	0	1	1
Totals (14 entries)		21	21	42	84

== Team ranking ==
Rank	Men's freestyle		Men's Greco-Roman		Women's freestyle	
Rank	Team	Points	Team	Points	Team	Points
1	Iran	66	Iran	60	China	63
2	South Korea	51	Kazakhstan	59	Japan	55
3	Kazakhstan	41	South Korea	41	Kazakhstan	45
4	Japan	40	Japan	39	South Korea	36
5	China	34	India	39	Mongolia	35
6	Kyrgyzstan	34	China	38	India	34
7	India	31	Kyrgyzstan	34	Kyrgyzstan	28
8	Mongolia	28	North Korea	18	Vietnam	23
9	North Korea	27	Chinese Taipei	18	Chinese Taipei	21
10	Iraq	14	Thailand	15	North Korea	19

== Medal summary ==
=== Men's freestyle ===
Event	Gold	Silver	Bronze
55 kg	Kim Hyo-sub; South Korea	Yang Kyong-il; North Korea	Nurlan Orozbek Uulu; Kyrgyzstan
55 kg	Kim Hyo-sub; South Korea	Yang Kyong-il; North Korea	Hassan Rahimi; Iran
60 kg	Jo Tong-hyok; North Korea	Ganzorigiin Mandakhnaran; Mongolia	Masoud Esmaeilpour; Iran
60 kg	Jo Tong-hyok; North Korea	Ganzorigiin Mandakhnaran; Mongolia	Bazar Bazarguruev; Kyrgyzstan
66 kg	Mehdi Taghavi; Iran	Tatsuhiro Yonemitsu; Japan	Yang Chun-song; North Korea
66 kg	Mehdi Taghavi; Iran	Tatsuhiro Yonemitsu; Japan	Kim Dai-sung; South Korea
74 kg	Sadegh Goudarzi; Iran	Abdulkhakim Shapiyev; Kazakhstan	Kim Jin-i; South Korea
74 kg	Sadegh Goudarzi; Iran	Abdulkhakim Shapiyev; Kazakhstan	Ramesh Kumar; India
84 kg	Ehsan Lashgari; Iran	Lee Jae-sung; South Korea	Anuj Chaudhary; India
84 kg	Ehsan Lashgari; Iran	Lee Jae-sung; South Korea	Siriguleng; China
96 kg	Saeid Ebrahimi; Iran	Tömörkhüügiin Enkh-Amgalan; Mongolia	Yang Wulin; China
96 kg	Saeid Ebrahimi; Iran	Tömörkhüügiin Enkh-Amgalan; Mongolia	Daulet Shabanbay; Kazakhstan
120 kg	Fardin Masoumi; Iran	Nam Kyung-jin; South Korea	Marid Mutalimov; Kazakhstan
120 kg	Fardin Masoumi; Iran	Nam Kyung-jin; South Korea	Nobuyoshi Arakida; Japan

=== Men's Greco-Roman ===
Event	Gold	Silver	Bronze
55 kg	Kohei Hasegawa; Japan	Joginder Singh; India	Kim Won-mo; North Korea
55 kg	Kohei Hasegawa; Japan	Joginder Singh; India	Askhat Kudaibergenov; Kazakhstan
60 kg	Wan Feihu; China	Almat Kebispayev; Kazakhstan	Ryota Sato; Japan
60 kg	Wan Feihu; China	Almat Kebispayev; Kazakhstan	Jung Kyung-ho; South Korea
66 kg	Darkhan Bayakhmetov; Kazakhstan	Eom Hyeok; South Korea	Kim Kum-chol; North Korea
66 kg	Darkhan Bayakhmetov; Kazakhstan	Eom Hyeok; South Korea	Saeid Abdevali; Iran
74 kg	Farshad Alizadeh; Iran	Kang Hee-bok; South Korea	Tsukasa Tsurumaki; Japan
74 kg	Farshad Alizadeh; Iran	Kang Hee-bok; South Korea	Roman Melyoshin; Kazakhstan
84 kg	Taleb Nematpour; Iran	Andrey Samokhin; Kazakhstan	Zhu Yanxiao; China
84 kg	Taleb Nematpour; Iran	Andrey Samokhin; Kazakhstan	Lin Ming-hsuan; Chinese Taipei
96 kg	Amir Aliakbari; Iran	Margulan Assembekov; Kazakhstan	Anil Kumar; India
96 kg	Amir Aliakbari; Iran	Margulan Assembekov; Kazakhstan	Yahia Abutabeekh; Jordan
120 kg	Masoud Hashemzadeh; Iran	Dharmender Dalal; India	Ali Nadhim; Iraq
120 kg	Masoud Hashemzadeh; Iran	Dharmender Dalal; India	Murat Ramonov; Kyrgyzstan

=== Women's freestyle ===
Event	Gold	Silver	Bronze
48 kg	Li Xiaomei; China	Zhuldyz Eshimova; Kazakhstan	Nguyễn Thị Lụa; Vietnam
48 kg	Li Xiaomei; China	Zhuldyz Eshimova; Kazakhstan	Makiko Sakamoto; Japan
51 kg	Tatyana Bakatyuk; Kazakhstan	Han Kum-ok; North Korea	Zeng Qingping; China
51 kg	Tatyana Bakatyuk; Kazakhstan	Han Kum-ok; North Korea	Davaasükhiin Otgontsetseg; Mongolia
55 kg	Chikako Matsukawa; Japan	Chen Juan; China	Aiyim Abdildina; Kazakhstan
55 kg	Chikako Matsukawa; Japan	Chen Juan; China	Choe Jong-bok; North Korea
59 kg	Yurika Ito; Japan	Jia Mei; China	Um Ji-eun; South Korea
59 kg	Yurika Ito; Japan	Jia Mei; China	Alka Tomar; India
63 kg	Mio Nishimaki; Japan	Wilaiwan Thongkam; Thailand	Lương Thị Quyên; Vietnam
63 kg	Mio Nishimaki; Japan	Wilaiwan Thongkam; Thailand	Zhang Fengliu; China
67 kg	Yelena Shalygina; Kazakhstan	Ma Yan; China	Badrakhyn Odonchimeg; Mongolia
67 kg	Yelena Shalygina; Kazakhstan	Ma Yan; China	Yoshiko Inoue; Japan
72 kg	Hong Yan; China	Asuka Sano; Japan	Yana Panova; Kyrgyzstan
72 kg	Hong Yan; China	Asuka Sano; Japan	Ochirbatyn Burmaa; Mongolia

== Participating nations ==
244 competitors from 25 nations competed.

- China (20)
- Chinese Taipei (16)
- India (19)
- Indonesia (7)
- Iran (14)
- Iraq (7)
- Japan (20)
- Jordan (2)
- Kazakhstan (21)
- Kyrgyzstan (19)
- Laos (2)
- Mongolia (13)
- North Korea (9)
- Pakistan (2)
- Philippines (1)
- Qatar (4)
- Singapore (2)
- South Korea (21)
- Sri Lanka (5)
- Syria (6)
- Tajikistan (3)
- Thailand (14)
- Turkmenistan (6)
- United Arab Emirates (1)
- Vietnam (10)
