= Francisco Soler (wrestler) =

Puerto Rican sport wrestler

Personal information
- Full name: Francisco Daniel Soler Tanco
- Born: August 23, 1992 (age 33) Santo Domingo, Dominican Republic
- Height: 173 cm (5 ft 8 in)
- Weight: 73 kg (161 lb)

Sport
- Country: Puerto Rico
- Sport: Freestyle wrestling
- Weight class: −74 kg

Francisco Daniel Soler Tanco (Note: In this Spanish name, the first or paternal surname is Soler and the second or maternal family name is Tanco.) (born August 23, 1992) is an Olympic male sport wrestler from Puerto Rico. Soler competed for Puerto Rico at the 2012 Summer Olympics in the men's freestyle 74 kg event. He also competed at the 2015 World Wrestling Championships in the men's freestyle 74 kg event.
