= Aniuar Geduev =

Russian freestyle wrestler

Aniuar Geduev Аниуар Гедуев
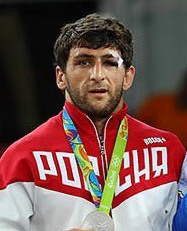
- 2016 Olympic Games

Personal information
- Full name: Aniuar Borisovich Geduev
- National team: Russia
- Citizenship: Russian
- Born: January 26, 1987 (age 39) Psygansy, Urvansky District, Kabardino-Balkaria, Russia
- Height: 1.75 m (5 ft 9 in)
- Weight: 79 kg (174 lb)

Sport
- Country: Kabardino-Balkaria, Russia
- Sport: Wrestling
- Event: Freestyle
- Club: CSKA Wrestling Club; CSC Nalchik
- Coached by: Alan Kaziev, Arsen Khasanov, Anvar Magomedov
Medal record
Men's Freestyle wrestling
Representing Russia
Olympic Games
Silver medal – second place	2016 Rio de Janeiro	74 kg
World Championships
Bronze medal – third place	2015 Las Vegas	74 kg
European Games
Gold medal – first place	2015 Baku	74 kg
European Championships
Gold medal – first place	2013 Tbilisi	74 kg
Gold medal – first place	2014 Vantaa	74 kg
World Cup
Gold medal – first place	2010 Moscow	74 kg

Aniuar Borisovich Geduev (Russian: Аниуар Борисович Гедуев, Kabardian: Джэду Борис и къуэ Iэниуар; born 26 January 1987) is a Russian former freestyle wrestler of Circassian Kabardian ancestry.

== Career ==
Geduev competed in the 74 kg division at the 2013 European Wrestling Championships and the 2014 European Wrestling Championships, winning gold medals in both competitions. In the gold-medal match at the 2015 European Games he defeated Soner Demirtaş of Turkey by technical fall (10–0). Geduev claimed his first world medal later that year, winning bronze at the World Wrestling Championships in 2015. In the rematch of the 2016 Russian Nationals, he beat the three-time world champion Denis Tsargush and won the Olympic Team Trials. He competed at the 2016 Olympics. After his win over Bekzod Abdurakhmonov of Uzbekistan in the opening round, he beat Jordan Burroughs of United States in the quarterfinals. He then beat Jabrayil Hasanov of Azerbaijan to claim his spot in the finals. He lost his final match to the Iranian wrestler Hassan Yazdani and was awarded the silver medal.
