= Pürevjavyn Önörbat =

Mongolian freestyle wrestler

Purevjavyn Unurbat
Personal information
- Native name: Пүрэвжавын Өнөрбат
- Nationality: Mongolia
- Born: 15 February 1989 (age 37) Darkhan, Mongolia
- Height: 170 cm (5 ft 7 in)

Sport
- Country: Mongolia
- Sport: Wrestling
- Weight class: 74-86 kg
- Event: Freestyle
- Coached by: Tsend Bayarsaikhan

Achievements and titles
- Olympic finals: 15th (2016)
- World finals: (silver) (2015) 7th (2018)
- Regional finals: (silver) (2008) (silver) (2014) (bronze) (2010) (bronze) (2011) (bronze) (2017)
Medal record
Men's freestyle wrestling
Representing Mongolia
World Championships
Silver medal – second place	2015 Las Vegas	74 kg
Asian Championships
Silver medal – second place	2008 Jeju City	66 kg
Silver medal – second place	2014 Astana	74 kg
Bronze medal – third place	2017 New Delhi	86 kg
Bronze medal – third place	2011 Tashkent	74 kg
Bronze medal – third place	2010 New Delhi	66 kg
Yasar Dogu Tournament
Bronze medal – third place	2016 Istanbul	86 kg
Bronze medal – third place	2013 Ankara	74 kg
World Junior Championships
Bronze medal – third place	2008 Istanbul	66 kg
Asian Juniors Championships
Silver medal – second place	2007 Manila	66 kg
Bronze medal – third place	2006 Abu Dhabi	60 kg
Asian Cadets Championships
Gold medal – first place	2005 Oarai	58 kg

Purevjavyn Unurbat (born 15 February 1988) is a Mongolian freestyle wrestler. He was the 2015 World Championships silver medalist and undefeated 2016 World Cup wrestler.

He competed in the freestyle 74 kg event at the 2012 Summer Olympics and was eliminated by Davit Khutsishvili in the qualifications.

At the 2015 World Championships, he won the silver medal in the 74 kg event despite being unranked entering the championship. He beat Gong Byungman in the first round, Cristian Jose Sarco in the second, Zelimkhan Khadjiev in the quarterfinal and Narsingh Pancham Yadav in the semifinal before losing to Jordan Burroughs in the final. It was Burroughs's fourth world title, and Önörbat lost to a technical fall.

At the 2016 World Cup he earned the 6th place in the 74 kg event, with wins over Soner Demirtaş (WO), 2014 World Champion Khetag Tsabolov (10–2), 2016 European Championships medalist Jakob Makarashvili (5–4), 2011 World Championships medalist Ashraf Aliyev (7–0), leaving the tournament undefeated in the individual standings.

At the 2016 Olympics, he lost to Soner Demirtaş in his first match.
