= Gela Saghirashvili =

Georgian freestyle wrestler

Gela Saghirashvili (born November 7, 1980) is a male freestyle wrestler from Georgia. He participated in Men's freestyle 74 kg at 2008 Summer Olympics. After beating Augusto Midana he lost with Murad Gaidarov and was eliminated from competition.

He participated as well in Men's freestyle 74 kg at 2004 Summer Olympics where he was ranked in 14th place.
