= Ramesh Kumar (wrestler) =

Indian wrestler

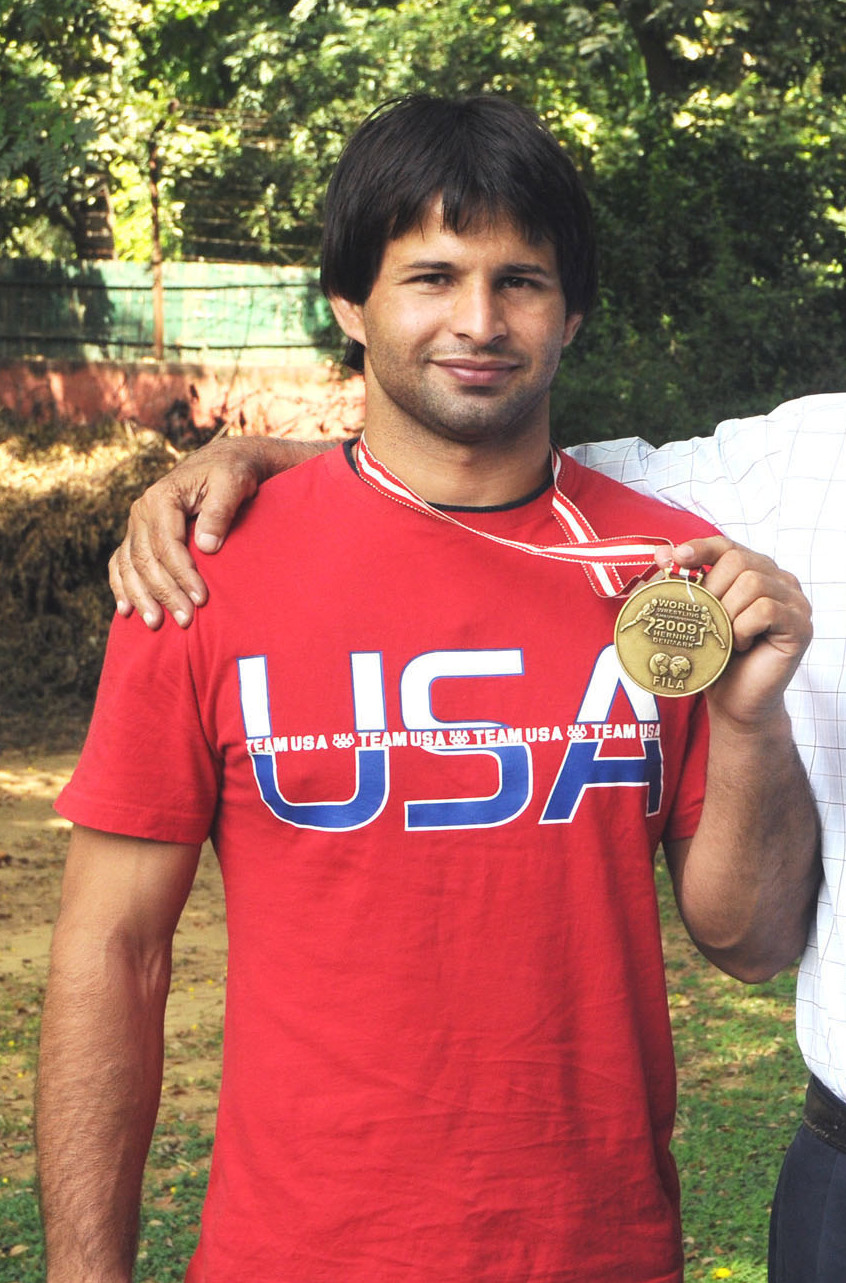
- Kumar in 2009 with his World Championship medal

Personal information
- Nationality: (India) Indian
- Born: 15 November 1981 (age 44) Purkhas Village, Sonipat district, Haryana, India

Sport
- Country: India
- Sport: Wrestling
- Event: Freestyle wrestling
Medal record
Representing India
Men's Freestyle Wrestling
World Wrestling Championships
Bronze medal – third place	2009 Herning	Freestyle 74 kg
Commonwealth Games
Gold medal – first place	2002 Manchester	Freestyle 66 kg
Asian Wrestling Championships
Silver medal – second place	2001 Ulan Bator	Freestyle 69 kg
Bronze medal – third place	2005 Wuhan	Freestyle 74 kg
Bronze medal – third place	2009 Pattaya	Freestyle 74 kg
Commonwealth Wrestling Championship
Gold medal – first place	2005 Cape Town	Freestyle 74 kg
Bronze medal – third place	2005 Cape Town	Greco-Roman 74 kg
World Junior Wrestling Championships
Gold medal – first place	2001 Tashkent	69 kg
- Updated on 15 September 2015

Ramesh Kumar is an Indian wrestler, who the bronze medal in the Men's 74kg Freestyle Wrestling event at the 2009 Wrestling World Championship in Herning, Denmark.

== Biography ==
He was born in Purkhas in Sonipat district of Haryana.

While still in school, his maternal grandfather who was also a wrestler sent him to Capt. Chand Roop& Chotu Ram ’s Akhada, a school of Indian-style wrestling, pehlwani, at Azadpur, Delhi, in 1994. In 1997, while still studying in ninth standard at the Jahangirpuri Government School, he won a gold medal, at the 11th World Cadet Wrestling Championships, after beating Russia's B Yusuf on points (6-3), in the 63-kg category.

At the 2002 Commonwealth Games, he won gold medal in 66 kg category.

In 2005, at the 51st National Championship, he beat Sombir of Haryana, in the 74 kg freestyle to win the finals. He represented India at the 2004 Summer Olympics in Men's Freestyle 66 kg category, though he missed 2008 Olympics due to back injury. After 2004, he switched to 74 kg category.

At the 2009 FILA Wrestling World Championships, he defeated Alexandr Burca of Moldova to win a bronze medal, which was India's first medal win at the championship, after Vishambhar Singh won a silver in 1967, 42 years ago.

He lives and trains in Sonepat, Haryana.
