= Sadegh Goudarzi =

Iranian wrestler (born 1987)

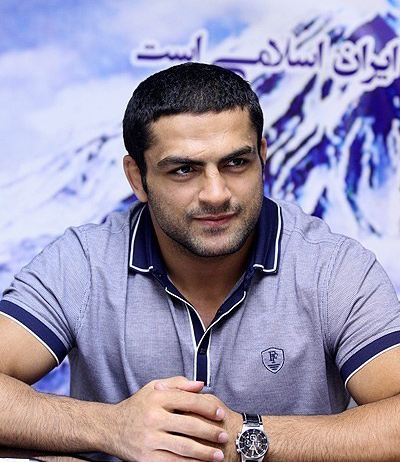

Personal information
- Full name: Sadegh Goudarzi
- Nationality: Iran
- Born: September 22, 1987 (age 38) Malayer, Iran

Sport
- Country: Iran
- Sport: Wrestling
- Event: Freestyle
Medal record
Representing Iran
Men's freestyle wrestling
Olympic Games
Silver medal – second place	2012 London	74 kg
World Championships
Silver medal – second place	2010 Moscow	74 kg
Silver medal – second place	2011 Istanbul	74 kg
Bronze medal – third place	2009 Herning	74 kg
Asian Games
Gold medal – first place	2010 Guangzhou	74 kg
Asian Championships
Gold medal – first place	2009 Pattaya	74 kg
Gold medal – first place	2012 Gumi	74 kg

Sadegh Goudarzi (Persian: صادق گودرزى, born 22 September 1987 in Malayer) is an Iranian wrestler. Goudarzi won the silver medal in the 74 kg Freestyle competition at the 2012 Summer Olympics.
