= 2009 World Wrestling Championships =

- Host city: Herning, Denmark
- Dates: 21–27 September 2009
- Stadium: Messecenter Herning

Champions
- Freestyle: Russia
- Greco-Roman: Turkey
- Women: Azerbaijan

The 2009 World Wrestling Championships were held at the Messecenter Herning in Herning, Denmark. The event took place from September 21 to September 27, 2009.

== Medal table ==
Rank	Nation	Gold	Silver	Bronze	Total
1	Russia	5	4	3	12
2	Azerbaijan	3	4	3	10
3	Iran	2	1	4	7
4	Turkey	2	1	2	5
5	Japan	2	0	2	4
6	North Korea	1	1	1	3
6	Sweden	1	1	1	3
6	Uzbekistan	1	1	1	3
9	Canada	1	0	2	3
9	Cuba	1	0	2	3
11	Hungary	1	0	1	2
12	China	1	0	0	1
13	United States	0	2	1	3
14	Denmark	0	1	1	2
14	Georgia	0	1	1	2
14	Mongolia	0	1	1	2
17	Armenia	0	1	0	1
17	France	0	1	0	1
17	Poland	0	1	0	1
20	Ukraine	0	0	5	5
21	Belarus	0	0	3	3
21	Kazakhstan	0	0	3	3
23	Bulgaria	0	0	1	1
23	Greece	0	0	1	1
23	India	0	0	1	1
23	Nigeria	0	0	1	1
23	Spain	0	0	1	1
Totals (27 entries)		21	21	42	84

== Team ranking ==
Rank	Men's freestyle		Men's Greco-Roman		Women's freestyle	
Rank	Team	Points	Team	Points	Team	Points
1	Russia	63	Turkey	44	Azerbaijan	42
2	Azerbaijan	48	Iran	39	Japan	37
3	Iran	40	Azerbaijan	38	Canada	37
4	Turkey	27	Russia	31	Ukraine	35
5	Ukraine	23	Cuba	26	Russia	27
6	Belarus	21	Hungary	19	United States	24
7	United States	19	Georgia	19	Mongolia	19
8	Uzbekistan	18	Denmark; Sweden	17	North Korea	17
9	Georgia; India; Japan	14	Denmark; Sweden	17	Kazakhstan	17
10	Georgia; India; Japan	14	Uzbekistan	17	China	16

== Medal summary ==
=== Men's freestyle ===
Event	Gold	Silver	Bronze
55 kg	Yang Kyong-il; North Korea	Sezar Akgül; Turkey	Rizvan Gadzhiev; Belarus
55 kg	Yang Kyong-il; North Korea	Sezar Akgül; Turkey	Viktor Lebedev; Russia
60 kg	Besik Kudukhov; Russia	Zelimkhan Huseynov; Azerbaijan	Dilshod Mansurov; Uzbekistan
60 kg	Besik Kudukhov; Russia	Zelimkhan Huseynov; Azerbaijan	Vasyl Fedoryshyn; Ukraine
66 kg	Mehdi Taghavi; Iran	Rasul Dzhukaev; Russia	Tatsuhiro Yonemitsu; Japan
66 kg	Mehdi Taghavi; Iran	Rasul Dzhukaev; Russia	Leonid Spiridonov; Kazakhstan
74 kg	Denis Tsargush; Russia	Chamsulvara Chamsulvarayev; Azerbaijan	Ramesh Kumar; India
74 kg	Denis Tsargush; Russia	Chamsulvara Chamsulvarayev; Azerbaijan	Sadegh Goudarzi; Iran
84 kg	Zaurbek Sokhiev; Uzbekistan	Jake Herbert; United States	Ibragim Aldatov; Ukraine
84 kg	Zaurbek Sokhiev; Uzbekistan	Jake Herbert; United States	Sharif Sharifov; Azerbaijan
96 kg	Khadzhimurat Gatsalov; Russia	Khetag Gazyumov; Azerbaijan	Serhat Balcı; Turkey
96 kg	Khadzhimurat Gatsalov; Russia	Khetag Gazyumov; Azerbaijan	Giorgi Gogshelidze; Georgia
120 kg	Bilyal Makhov; Russia	Fardin Masoumi; Iran	Ioannis Arzoumanidis; Greece
120 kg	Bilyal Makhov; Russia	Fardin Masoumi; Iran	Tervel Dlagnev; United States

=== Men's Greco-Roman ===
Event	Gold	Silver	Bronze
55 kg	Hamid Sourian; Iran	Roman Amoyan; Armenia	Håkan Nyblom; Denmark
55 kg	Hamid Sourian; Iran	Roman Amoyan; Armenia	Rovshan Bayramov; Azerbaijan
60 kg	Islambek Albiev; Russia	Dilshod Aripov; Uzbekistan	Nurbakyt Tengizbayev; Kazakhstan
60 kg	Islambek Albiev; Russia	Dilshod Aripov; Uzbekistan	Vitaliy Rahimov; Azerbaijan
66 kg	Farid Mansurov; Azerbaijan	Manuchar Tskhadaia; Georgia	Ambako Vachadze; Russia
66 kg	Farid Mansurov; Azerbaijan	Manuchar Tskhadaia; Georgia	Pedro Mulens; Cuba
74 kg	Selçuk Çebi; Turkey	Mark Madsen; Denmark	Aliaksandr Kikiniou; Belarus
74 kg	Selçuk Çebi; Turkey	Mark Madsen; Denmark	Farshad Alizadeh; Iran
84 kg	Nazmi Avluca; Turkey	Mélonin Noumonvi; France	Habibollah Akhlaghi; Iran
84 kg	Nazmi Avluca; Turkey	Mélonin Noumonvi; France	Pablo Shorey; Cuba
96 kg	Balázs Kiss; Hungary	Jimmy Lidberg; Sweden	Amir Aliakbari; Iran
96 kg	Balázs Kiss; Hungary	Jimmy Lidberg; Sweden	Aslanbek Khushtov; Russia
120 kg	Mijaín López; Cuba	Dremiel Byers; United States	Jalmar Sjöberg; Sweden
120 kg	Mijaín López; Cuba	Dremiel Byers; United States	Rıza Kayaalp; Turkey

=== Women's freestyle ===
Event	Gold	Silver	Bronze
48 kg	Mariya Stadnik; Azerbaijan	Lorisa Oorzhak; Russia	So Sim-hyang; North Korea
48 kg	Mariya Stadnik; Azerbaijan	Lorisa Oorzhak; Russia	Lyudmyla Balushka; Ukraine
51 kg	Sofia Mattsson; Sweden	Han Kum-ok; North Korea	Oleksandra Kohut; Ukraine
51 kg	Sofia Mattsson; Sweden	Han Kum-ok; North Korea	Yuri Kai; Japan
55 kg	Saori Yoshida; Japan	Sona Ahmadli; Azerbaijan	Alena Filipava; Belarus
55 kg	Saori Yoshida; Japan	Sona Ahmadli; Azerbaijan	Tonya Verbeek; Canada
59 kg	Yuliya Ratkevich; Azerbaijan	Agata Pietrzyk; Poland	Marianna Sastin; Hungary
59 kg	Yuliya Ratkevich; Azerbaijan	Agata Pietrzyk; Poland	Hanna Vasylenko; Ukraine
63 kg	Mio Nishimaki; Japan	Lubov Volosova; Russia	Yelena Shalygina; Kazakhstan
63 kg	Mio Nishimaki; Japan	Lubov Volosova; Russia	Justine Bouchard; Canada
67 kg	Martine Dugrenier; Canada	Yulia Bartnovskaya; Russia	Ifeoma Iheanacho; Nigeria
67 kg	Martine Dugrenier; Canada	Yulia Bartnovskaya; Russia	Badrakhyn Odonchimeg; Mongolia
72 kg	Qin Xiaoqing; China	Ochirbatyn Burmaa; Mongolia	Maider Unda; Spain
72 kg	Qin Xiaoqing; China	Ochirbatyn Burmaa; Mongolia	Stanka Zlateva; Bulgaria

== Participating nations ==
639 competitors from 70 nations participated.

- Argentina (1)
- Armenia (15)
- Australia (1)
- Austria (6)
- Azerbaijan (19)
- Belarus (20)
- Brazil (9)
- Bulgaria (17)
- Cameroon (1)
- Canada (14)
- China (20)
- Chinese Taipei (1)
- Croatia (4)
- Cuba (14)
- Czech Republic (9)
- Denmark (7)
- Dominican Republic (5)
- Egypt (6)
- Estonia (3)
- Finland (7)
- France (10)
- Georgia (14)
- Germany (15)
- Great Britain (5)
- Greece (8)
- Hungary (14)
- India (17)
- Iran (14)
- Iraq (4)
- Israel (6)
- Italy (9)
- Japan (21)
- Jordan (1)
- Kazakhstan (21)
- Kyrgyzstan (13)
- Latvia (6)
- Lithuania (9)
- Madagascar (2)
- Mexico (4)
- Moldova (10)
- Mongolia (13)
- Montenegro (2)
- Morocco (1)
- New Zealand (1)
- Nigeria (3)
- North Korea (8)
- Norway (5)
- Poland (18)
- Portugal (1)
- Puerto Rico (2)
- Romania (14)
- Russia (21)
- Senegal (3)
- Serbia (4)
- Singapore (1)
- Slovakia (4)
- South Africa (4)
- South Korea (17)
- Spain (14)
- Sweden (9)
- Switzerland (4)
- Tajikistan (3)
- Tunisia (3)
- Turkey (19)
- Turkmenistan (2)
- Ukraine (21)
- United States (21)
- Uzbekistan (14)
- Venezuela (19)
- Vietnam (6)
