= Olegk Motsalin =

Greek wrestler (born 1986)

Personal information
- Born: April 9, 1986 (age 40)
- Height: 1.74 m (5 ft 8 1/2 in)
- Weight: 74 kg (163 lb)

Sport
- Country: Greece
- Sport: Wrestling
- Event: Freestyle
- Club: Polinikis
- Coached by: Charalambos Chafousidis (GRE)

Olegk Motsalin (Greek: Ολεγκ Μοτσαλιν; born April 9, 1986) is a Greek wrestler, who competed for the men's freestyle 74 kg at the 2012 Summer Olympics in London, after winning a silver medal at the World Qualifying Tournament in Helsinki, Finland. He was eliminated in the first round, losing out to Uzbekistan's Soslan Tigiev, who later won the bronze medal in this category, but subsequently disqualified for being tested positive in a banned substance.

Motsalin is also currently a member of Polinikis, being coached and trained by Charalambos Chafousidis.
