= Abdulkhakim Shapiyev =

Kazakhstani wrestler (born 1983)

Medal record

Men's Freestyle wrestling

Representing Kazakhstan

World Championships
Bronze medal – third place	2010 Moscow	74 kg

Asian Games
Bronze medal – third place	2006 Doha	74 kg

Asian Championships
Silver medal – second place	2009 Pattaya	74 kg

Abdulkhakim Shapiyev (born December 4, 1983, in Dagestan ASSR, Soviet Union) is a Russian and Kazakhstani male freestyle wrestler of Avar heritage.
