= 2010 World Wrestling Championships =

Wrestling competition

- Host city: Moscow, Russia
- Dates: 6–12 September 2010
- Stadium: Olympic Stadium

Champions
- Freestyle: Russia
- Greco-Roman: Russia
- Women: Japan

The 2010 World Wrestling Championships were held at the Olympic Stadium in Moscow, Russia. The event took place between September 6 to September 12, 2010.

== Medal table ==
Rank	Nation	Gold	Silver	Bronze	Total
1	Russia	5	3	8	16
2	Japan	3	2	3	8
3	Bulgaria	3	0	0	3
4	Azerbaijan	2	2	3	7
5	Iran	2	1	1	4
6	Ukraine	1	2	1	4
7	Cuba	1	1	3	5
8	Canada	1	1	1	3
9	Turkey	1	0	2	3
10	India	1	0	0	1
10	Mongolia	1	0	0	1
12	Armenia	0	2	1	3
13	Uzbekistan	0	2	0	2
14	Kazakhstan	0	1	3	4
15	Belarus	0	1	1	2
15	China	0	1	1	2
15	South Korea	0	1	1	2
15	United States	0	1	1	2
19	Sweden	0	0	4	4
20	Georgia	0	0	2	2
21	Croatia	0	0	1	1
21	France	0	0	1	1
21	Greece	0	0	1	1
21	Hungary	0	0	1	1
21	Kyrgyzstan	0	0	1	1
21	Nigeria	0	0	1	1
Totals (26 entries)		21	21	42	84

== Team ranking ==
Rank	Men's freestyle		Men's Greco-Roman		Women's freestyle	
Rank	Team	Points	Team	Points	Team	Points
1	Russia	66	Russia	46	Japan	61
2	Azerbaijan	42	Turkey	32	Russia	39
3	Cuba	38	Azerbaijan	26	Canada	36
4	Iran	27	Armenia	26	Sweden	30
5	Georgia	21	Cuba	24	United States	28
6	Bulgaria	18	Bulgaria	24	Kazakhstan	24
7	Uzbekistan	18	Kazakhstan	24	China	23
8	Ukraine	18	Iran	22	Mongolia	22
9	Kazakhstan	15	South Korea	20	Azerbaijan	22
10	Hungary	14	Japan	15	Ukraine	21

== Medal summary ==
=== Men's freestyle ===
Event	Gold	Silver	Bronze
55 kg	Viktor Lebedev; Russia	Toghrul Asgarov; Azerbaijan	Frank Chamizo; Cuba
55 kg	Viktor Lebedev; Russia	Toghrul Asgarov; Azerbaijan	Yasuhiro Inaba; Japan
60 kg	Besik Kudukhov; Russia	Vasyl Fedoryshyn; Ukraine	Morad Mohammadi; Iran
60 kg	Besik Kudukhov; Russia	Vasyl Fedoryshyn; Ukraine	Zelimkhan Huseynov; Azerbaijan
66 kg	Sushil Kumar; India	Alan Gogaev; Russia	Jabrayil Hasanov; Azerbaijan
66 kg	Sushil Kumar; India	Alan Gogaev; Russia	Geandry Garzón; Cuba
74 kg	Denis Tsargush; Russia	Sadegh Goudarzi; Iran	Gábor Hatos; Hungary
74 kg	Denis Tsargush; Russia	Sadegh Goudarzi; Iran	Abdulkhakim Shapiyev; Kazakhstan
84 kg	Mihail Ganev; Bulgaria	Zaurbek Sokhiev; Uzbekistan	Soslan Ktsoev; Russia
84 kg	Mihail Ganev; Bulgaria	Zaurbek Sokhiev; Uzbekistan	Reineris Salas; Cuba
96 kg	Khetag Gazyumov; Azerbaijan	Khadzhimurat Gatsalov; Russia	Ruslan Sheikhau; Belarus
96 kg	Khetag Gazyumov; Azerbaijan	Khadzhimurat Gatsalov; Russia	Giorgi Gogshelidze; Georgia
120 kg	Bilyal Makhov; Russia	Artur Taymazov; Uzbekistan	Levan Berianidze; Georgia
120 kg	Bilyal Makhov; Russia	Artur Taymazov; Uzbekistan	Ioannis Arzoumanidis; Greece

=== Men's Greco-Roman ===
Event	Gold	Silver	Bronze
55 kg	Hamid Sourian; Iran	Choi Gyu-jin; South Korea	Nazyr Mankiev; Russia
55 kg	Hamid Sourian; Iran	Choi Gyu-jin; South Korea	Roman Amoyan; Armenia
60 kg	Hasan Aliyev; Azerbaijan	Ryutaro Matsumoto; Japan	Almat Kebispayev; Kazakhstan
60 kg	Hasan Aliyev; Azerbaijan	Ryutaro Matsumoto; Japan	Jung Ji-hyun; South Korea
66 kg	Ambako Vachadze; Russia	Armen Vardanyan; Ukraine	Vasıf Arzumanov; Turkey
66 kg	Ambako Vachadze; Russia	Armen Vardanyan; Ukraine	Vitaliy Rahimov; Azerbaijan
74 kg	Selçuk Çebi; Turkey	Arsen Julfalakyan; Armenia	Imil Sharafetdinov; Russia
74 kg	Selçuk Çebi; Turkey	Arsen Julfalakyan; Armenia	Daniar Kobonov; Kyrgyzstan
84 kg	Hristo Marinov; Bulgaria	Pablo Shorey; Cuba	Aleksey Mishin; Russia
84 kg	Hristo Marinov; Bulgaria	Pablo Shorey; Cuba	Nenad Žugaj; Croatia
96 kg	Amir Aliakbari; Iran	Tsimafei Dzeinichenka; Belarus	Aslanbek Khushtov; Russia
96 kg	Amir Aliakbari; Iran	Tsimafei Dzeinichenka; Belarus	Jimmy Lidberg; Sweden
120 kg	Mijaín López; Cuba	Yury Patrikeyev; Armenia	Nurmakhan Tinaliyev; Kazakhstan
120 kg	Mijaín López; Cuba	Yury Patrikeyev; Armenia	Rıza Kayaalp; Turkey

=== Women's freestyle ===
Event	Gold	Silver	Bronze
48 kg	Hitomi Sakamoto; Japan	Lorisa Oorzhak; Russia	Zhao Shasha; China
48 kg	Hitomi Sakamoto; Japan	Lorisa Oorzhak; Russia	Carol Huynh; Canada
51 kg	Oleksandra Kohut; Ukraine	Yu Horiuchi; Japan	Sofia Mattsson; Sweden
51 kg	Oleksandra Kohut; Ukraine	Yu Horiuchi; Japan	Zamira Rakhmanova; Russia
55 kg	Saori Yoshida; Japan	Yuliya Ratkevich; Azerbaijan	Anna Gomis; France
55 kg	Saori Yoshida; Japan	Yuliya Ratkevich; Azerbaijan	Tatiana Suarez; United States
59 kg	Soronzonboldyn Battsetseg; Mongolia	Zhang Lan; China	Ayako Shoda; Japan
59 kg	Soronzonboldyn Battsetseg; Mongolia	Zhang Lan; China	Johanna Mattsson; Sweden
63 kg	Kaori Icho; Japan	Elena Pirozhkova; United States	Henna Johansson; Sweden
63 kg	Kaori Icho; Japan	Elena Pirozhkova; United States	Lubov Volosova; Russia
67 kg	Martine Dugrenier; Canada	Yelena Shalygina; Kazakhstan	Ifeoma Iheanacho; Nigeria
67 kg	Martine Dugrenier; Canada	Yelena Shalygina; Kazakhstan	Alla Cherkasova; Ukraine
72 kg	Stanka Zlateva; Bulgaria	Ohenewa Akuffo; Canada	Ekaterina Bukina; Russia
72 kg	Stanka Zlateva; Bulgaria	Ohenewa Akuffo; Canada	Kyoko Hamaguchi; Japan

== Participating nations ==
629 competitors from 85 nations participated.

- Albania (1)
- Algeria (2)
- Argentina (3)
- Armenia (14)
- Australia (5)
- Austria (4)
- Azerbaijan (21)
- Belarus (21)
- Brazil (3)
- Bulgaria (16)
- Cameroon (3)
- Canada (14)
- Chad (1)
- Chile (1)
- China (20)
- Chinese Taipei (2)
- Colombia (2)
- Croatia (5)
- Cuba (12)
- Cyprus (2)
- Czech Republic (7)
- Dominican Republic (3)
- Ecuador (3)
- Egypt (8)
- El Salvador (1)
- Estonia (5)
- Federated States of Micronesia (1)
- Finland (8)
- France (13)
- Georgia (14)
- Germany (16)
- Great Britain (3)
- Greece (11)
- Guam (2)
- Guinea-Bissau (2)
- Hungary (11)
- India (10)
- Iran (14)
- Israel (5)
- Italy (8)
- Japan (21)
- Jordan (2)
- Kazakhstan (21)
- Kyrgyzstan (13)
- Latvia (6)
- Lithuania (6)
- Macedonia (3)
- Madagascar (2)
- Malta (1)
- Mauritius (1)
- Moldova (13)
- Monaco (1)
- Mongolia (14)
- Morocco (1)
- Netherlands (1)
- New Zealand (4)
- Nicaragua (1)
- Nigeria (4)
- Norway (2)
- Palau (1)
- Poland (16)
- Portugal (1)
- Puerto Rico (4)
- Romania (14)
- Russia (21)
- San Marino (1)
- Senegal (2)
- Serbia (4)
- Slovakia (5)
- Slovenia (2)
- Solomon Islands (1)
- South Africa (5)
- South Korea (16)
- Spain (13)
- Sweden (9)
- Switzerland (6)
- Tajikistan (5)
- Tunisia (3)
- Turkey (17)
- Turkmenistan (6)
- Ukraine (21)
- United States (21)
- Uruguay (1)
- Uzbekistan (16)
- Venezuela (4)
