= Narsingh Yadav =

Indian wrestler (born 1989)

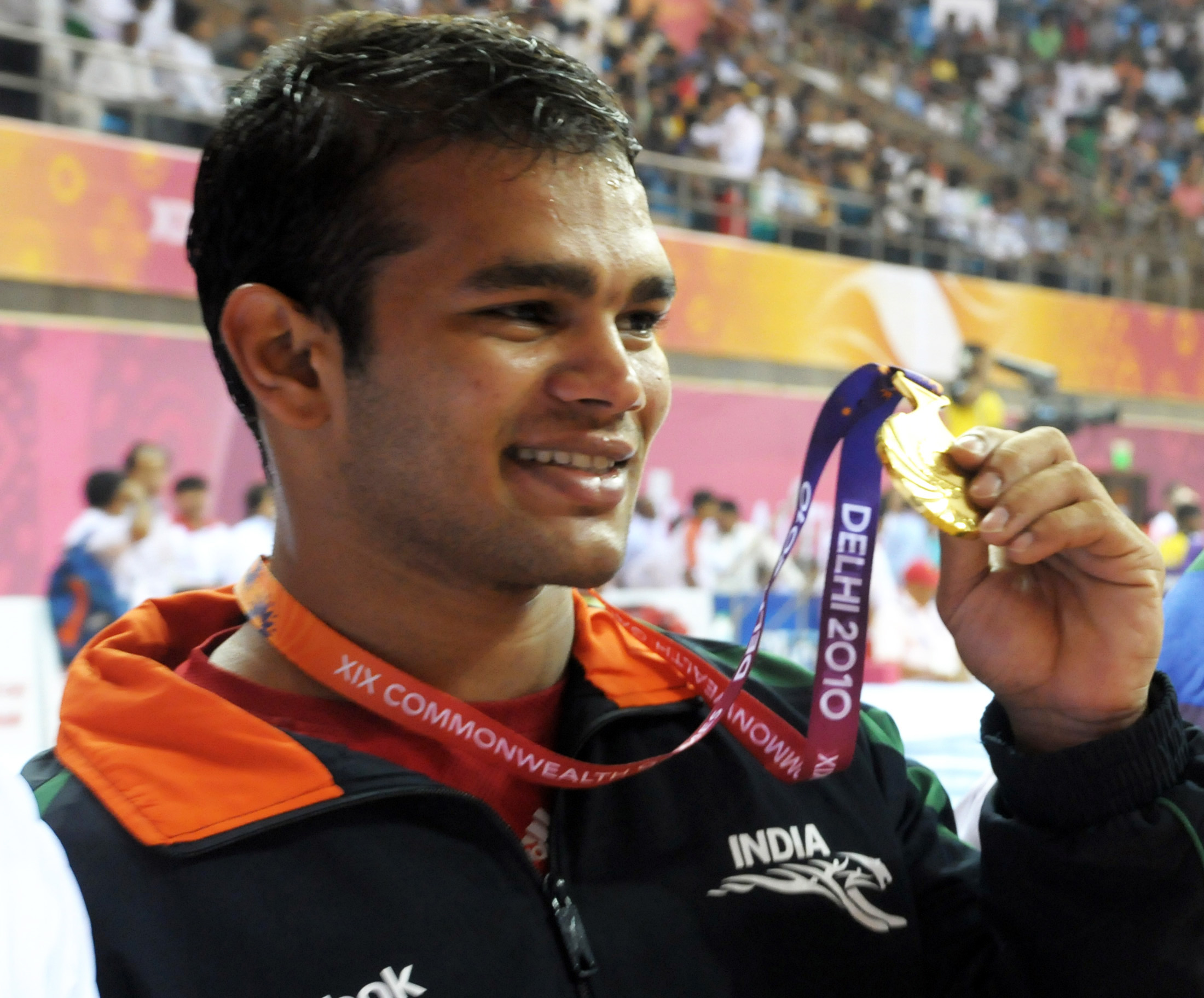
- Yadav at the 2010 Commonwealth Games in New Delhi

Personal information
- Nationality: India
- Born: Narsingh Pancham Yadav; 6 August 1989 (age 37) Varanasi, Uttar Pradesh, India
- Occupation: Wrestler
- Spouse: Shilpi Sheoran
- Website: http://www.narsinghyadav.com/
Medal record
Men's freestyle wrestling
Representing India
World Championships
Bronze medal – third place	2015 Las Vegas	74 kg
Asian Games
Bronze medal – third place	2014 Incheon	74 kg
Asian Championships
Gold medal – first place	2010 New Delhi	74 kg
Bronze medal – third place	2015 Doha	74 kg
Bronze medal – third place	2021 Almaty	79 kg
Commonwealth Games
Gold medal – first place	2010 New Delhi	74 kg
Commonwealth Championships
Silver medal – second place	2011 Melbourne	74 kg

Narsingh Pancham Yadav (born 6 August 1989) is an Indian wrestler. At the 2010 Commonwealth Games, he won the gold medal in the men's freestyle 74 kg category.

He was banned for 4 years and barred from the 2016 Olympics in Rio de Janeiro by the Court of Arbitration for Sport after the World Anti-Doping Agency (WADA) appealed against the decision of the National Anti-Doping Agency to allow him to compete even after he failed a doping test by testing positive for anabolic steroids. The National Anti-Doping Agency claimed Yadav's sample had been sabotaged by a rival.

He is a triple Maharashtra Kesari, a title in Indian kushti. He is the first wrestler to win the title 3 times in a row for 2011, 2012 and 2013. He was awarded the Arjuna Award in 2012 for his contribution to wrestling.

== Personal life and family ==
Narsingh Yadav is the son of Pancham Yadav and Bhulna Devi from eastern Uttar Pradesh. Narsingh and his brother Vinod both lived with their father Pancham and his mother in Neema village in Varanasi. Both the brothers became wrestlers. His brother Vinod Yadav is a ticket collector in the Indian Railways. Narsingh has been training since he was 13 and is currently a resident of suburban Kandivali in Mumbai. Narsingh is a Deputy superintendent of police in Maharashtra Police. Narsingh Yadav is married to wrestler Shilpi Sheoran.

== Career ==
He won a gold medal in the Asian championships, in the freestyle 74 kg, in 2010.

=== 2010 Commonwealth Games ===
At the Games held at home in New Delhi, India, Narsingh Yadav was a last-minute replacement and competed in the men's freestyle 74 kg category.

He managed to surprise everyone and won the gold medal, beating Richard Brian Addinall of South Africa in the gold medal bout.

=== 2011 Commonwealth Championship ===
In Melbourne, Australia, Narsingh finished second in the Commonwealth Championship winning the silver medal, losing in the final to Cleopas Ncube of Canada.

=== 2012 Olympics ===
At the Olympics in London, Narsingh Yadav lost his opening bout against Matt Gentry of Canada in the 74 kg freestyle event and was knocked out of the tournament.

=== 2014 Asian Games ===
In the round of 16 in Incheon, South Korea, Narsingh lost 1:3 to Rashid Kurbanov of Uzbekistan. With the Uzbek grappler qualifying for the final, Narsingh was able to compete for a medal through the repechage where he first faced Ramazan Kambarov of Turkmenistan and beat him 4:1. In the bronze medal bout, he was successful in securing the bronze medal with a 3:1 win over Daisuke Shimada of Japan.

In honour of his bronze medal, Narsingh, along with Seema Punia, was awarded a cash prize of Rs 50 lakh by the state government of Uttar Pradesh.

=== 2015–present ===
At the 2015 Asian Wrestling Championships, Yadav, who has been included in the 74 kg category in the absence of double-Olympic medalist Sushil Kumar, lost to Daisuke Shimada of Japan 9–12 in the qualification round, but qualified for the repechage round after the latter reached the final. In his repechage bout, he defeated Byungmin Kong of South Korea 15–4 to enter the bronze-medal play-off. He bagged 3–1 classification points to outplay Zhiger Zakirov of Kazakhstan and won the bronze medal.

Competing at the 2015 World Championships in Las Vegas, Yadav won 3:1 in the first round over Hanoch Rachamin of Israel. His next opponent was Soner Demirtas of Turkey whom he beat 3:1. In the third round, Narsingh was up against Livan Lopez Azcuy of Cuba and won 4:1. In the fourth round, he lost 3:1 to Unurbat Purevjav of Mongolia. This allowed him to contest for the bronze medal bout which he almost lost to Zelimkhan Khadjiev of France who was leading 12–4 with just a minute to go, and right out of nowhere he pulled a headlock and pinned Zelimkhan Khadjiev with a point tally of 8–12.

The bronze medal bout made news across India not just for his spectacular comeback but also because of one particular move – the 'Dhak' move used in dangals or local wrestling clubs across India. Yadav's assistant coach Jagmal Singh who had coached Yadav for ten years recounted, "It’s called Dhak. It’s a showboating wrestling move people use on mud-courts during big village-based tournaments. It's a crowd pleaser. But very difficult to pull off accurately."

==== 2016 Olympics controversy ====
Having won bronze at the World Championships qualified Yadav to the 2016 Rio Olympics but Sushil Kumar, who had missed the 2016 Summer Olympics qualification event due to injury, asked for a trial between himself and Narsingh and moved his request to the Delhi High Court. It was only after his appeal was rejected that it was confirmed that Narsingh was going to the 2016 Rio Olympics. However, Yadav failed two anti-doping tests, conducted on 25 June and 5 July 2016, testing positive for metandienone, which he asserted was to "sabotage" his chances of competing at the Olympics, following which he was given a clean chit by NADA. The World Anti-Doping Agency challenged the decision and the case was moved to the Court of Arbitration for Sport. A day prior to Yadav's first bout at the Olympics, on 18 August 2016, he was handed a four-year ban by the Court of Arbitration for Sport.

=== Pro Wrestling League ===
For the inaugural edition of the Pro Wrestling League, Narsingh was bought by the Bangalore franchise, owned by JSW Sports, during the auction conducted in New Delhi. The World Championship bronze medallist was the marquee player picked up by the Bangalore franchise for Rs 34.5 lakh.

The Pro Wrestling League is scheduled to kick off from 10 December till 27 December.

== Felicitations and awards ==
During the legendary Pele's visit to India to attend the final of the Subroto Cup, Narsingh was invited to a special dinner hosted by the organisers of the Subroto Cup and felicitated for his contributions to the sport of wrestling in India.

== Other titles ==
- Dave Schultz Memorial Tournament, 2012 – Fourth place

== Controversy ==
Yadav was given the job of deputy superintendent of police by the state after his 2010 Commonwealth medal. However he was caught cheating in an internal exam and faced an inquiry.
