= Chamsulvara Chamsulvarayev =

Azerbaijani wrestler (1984–2016)

Medal record

Men's freestyle wrestling

Representing Azerbaijan

World Championships
Silver medal – second place	2009 Herning	74 kg
Bronze medal – third place	2007 Baku	74 kg

European Championships
Gold medal – first place	2009 Vilnius	74 kg
Bronze medal – third place	2007 Sofia	74 kg
Bronze medal – third place	2008 Tampere	74 kg
Bronze medal – third place	2010 Baku	74 kg

Chamsulvara Chamsulvarayev (6 September 1984 – 28 September 2016) was a Russian male freestyle wrestler who represented Azerbaijan. He was born in Sergokalinsky, Dagestan, Russia.

== Career ==
He participated in Men's freestyle 74 kg at 2008 Summer Olympics. He was eliminated from the competition losing to Murad Gaidarov in the 1/8 of final. He won a bronze medal on 2007 FILA Wrestling World Championships. He was killed in Mosul, Iraq after joining the Islamic State (IS).
