= Suren Markosyan =

Armenian wrestler

Personal information
- Born: 17 September 1984 (age 41) Garni, Armenia
- Height: 1.72 m (5 ft 7 1/2 in)
- Weight: 78 kg (172 lb)

Sport
- Sport: Wrestling
- Event: Freestyle
- Club: Wrestling Club Garni
- Coached by: Armen Martirosyan

Suren Markosyan (Armenian: Սուրեն Մարկոսյան, born 17 September 1984) is an Armenian Freestyle wrestler. He became a Junior European Champion in 2004. Markosyan competed at the 2008 Summer Olympics in the men's freestyle 66 kg division.
