= Augusto Midana =

Bissau-Guinean freestyle wrestler

Personal information
- Nationality: Bissau-Guinean
- Born: 20 May 1984 (age 42)
- Height: 167 cm (5 ft 6 in)
- Weight: 74 kg (163 lb)

Sport
- Country: Guinea-Bissau
- Sport: Wrestling
- Events: Freestyle & Beach
Medal record
Men's Freestyle wrestling
Representing Guinea-Bissau
African Championship
Gold medal – first place	2016 Alexandria	74kg
Gold medal – first place	2015 Alexandria	74kg
Gold medal – first place	2014 Tunis	74kg
Gold medal – first place	2012 Marrakesh	74kg
Gold medal – first place	2011 Dakar	74kg
Gold medal – first place	2010 Cairo	74kg
Bronze medal – third place	2009 Casablanca	74kg
Bronze medal – third place	2008 Tunis	74kg
African Games
Bronze medal – third place	2007 Algiers	74kg
Men's Beach Wrestling
World Beach Wrestling Championships
Bronze medal – third place	2009 Obzor	85kg

Augusto Midana (born 20 May 1984) is a Bissau-Guinean freestyle wrestler who competes in the men's middleweight (-74 kg) category. He represented Guinea-Bissau in the 2008 Summer Olympics in Beijing, China, and was the flagbearer for his nation during the opening ceremonies of those games. He competed again at the 2012 Summer Olympics, finishing in 7th place.

He once again competed for Guinea-Bissau at the 2016 Summer Olympics in Rio de Janeiro. He was defeated by Jordan Burroughs of the United States in the first round. He was the flagbearer for Guinea-Bissau during the Parade of Nations. He qualified at the 2021 African & Oceania Wrestling Olympic Qualification Tournament to represent Guinea-Bissau at the 2020 Summer Olympics in Tokyo, Japan.

Midana is a six-time African champion in the men's middleweight (–74 kg) category.

== Major results ==
Year	Tournament	Venue	Result	Event
2006	African Championships	Pretoria, South Africa	6th	Freestyle 74 kg
2007	African Championships	Cairo, Egypt	7th	Freestyle 74 kg
2007	All-Africa Games	Algiers, Algeria	3rd	Freestyle 74 kg
2007	World Championships	Baku, Azerbaijan	39th	Freestyle 74 kg
2008	African Championships	Tunis, Tunisia	3rd	Freestyle 74 kg
2008	Olympic Games	Beijing, China	16th	Freestyle 74 kg
2009	African Championships	Casablanca, Morocco	3rd	Freestyle 74 kg
2010	African Championships	Cairo, Egypt	1st	Freestyle 74 kg
2010	World Championships	Moscow, Russia	19th	Freestyle 74 kg
2011	African Championships	Dakar, Senegal	1st	Freestyle 74 kg
2011	World Championships	Istanbul, Turkey	14th	Freestyle 74 kg
2012	African Championships	Marrakesh, Morocco	1st	Freestyle 74 kg
2012	Olympic Games	London, United Kingdom	7th	Freestyle 74 kg
2014	African Championships	Tunis, Tunisia	1st	Freestyle 74 kg
2014	World Championships	Tashkent, Uzbekistan	19th	Freestyle 74 kg
2015	African Championships	Alexandria, Egypt	1st	Freestyle 74 kg
2015	World Championships	Las Vegas, United States	20th	Freestyle 74 kg
2016	African Championships	Alexandria, Egypt	1st	Freestyle 74 kg
2016	Olympic Games	Rio de Janeiro, Brazil	14th	Freestyle 74 kg
2019	African Championships	Hammamet, Tunisia	3rd	Freestyle 74 kg
2019	African Games	Rabat-El Jadida, Morocco	11th	Freestyle 74 kg
2020	African Championships	Algiers, Algeria	9th	Freestyle 74 kg
2020	Olympic Games	Tokyo, Japan	11th	Freestyle 74 kg

Olympic Games
Preceded by Leopoldina Ross	Flagbearer for Guinea-Bissau; Beijing 2008; London 2012; Rio de Janeiro 2016; Tokyo 2020 with Taciana Cesar	Succeeded by Diamantino Iuna Fafé
