= Ashraf Aliyev =

Azerbaijani freestyle wrestler

Personal information
- Nationality: Azerbaijani
- Born: July 29, 1986 (age 39) Absheron Rayon, Azerbaijan
- Height: 5 ft 9 in (1.75 m)
- Weight: 74 kg (163 lb)

Sport
- Sport: Wrestling
Medal record
Men's freestyle wrestling
Representing Azerbaijan
World Championships
Bronze medal – third place	2011 Istanbul	74 kg

Ashraf Aliyev (born July 29, 1986) is a male freestyle wrestler. He participated in the Men's freestyle 74 kg at the 2012 Summer Olympics.
