= Denis Tsargush =

Russian freestyle wrestler (born 1987)

Denis Igorevich Tsargush
Personal information
- Native name: Денис Игоревич Царгуш
- Full name: Denis Igorevich Tsargush
- Nationality: Russia
- Born: 1 September 1987 (age 38) Gudauta, Georgian Soviet Socialist Republic, Soviet Union
- Height: 174 cm (5 ft 9 in)
- Website: www.instagram.com/tsargush1

Sport
- Country: Russia
- Sport: Wrestling
- Weight class: 74 kg
- Event: Freestyle
- Club: CSKA Wrestling Club
- Coached by: Islam Kalaev, Yuri Golod

Achievements and titles
- Olympic finals: (bronze) (2012)
- World finals: (gold) (2009) (2010) (2014)
- Regional finals: (gold) (2010) (2011) (2012)
- National finals: (gold) (2006) (2009) (2010) (2012) (2014)
Medal record
Men's freestyle wrestling
Representing Russia
Olympic Games
Bronze medal – third place	2012 London	74 kg
World Championships
Gold medal – first place	2009 Herning	74 kg
Gold medal – first place	2010 Moscow	74 kg
Gold medal – first place	2014 Tashkent	74 kg
World Cup
Silver medal – second place	2007 Krasnoyarsk	74 kg
European Championships
Gold medal – first place	2010 Baku	74 kg
Gold medal – first place	2011 Dortmund	74 kg
Gold medal – first place	2012 Belgrade	74 kg
Military World Games
Bronze medal – third place	2007 Hyderabad	74 kg
World Military Championships
Gold medal – first place	2006 Baku	74 kg
Summer Universiade
Gold medal – first place	2013 Kazan	74 kg
Yasar Dogu Tournament
Gold medal – first place	2015 Istanbul	74 kg
World Junior Championships
Gold medal – first place	2007 Beijing	74 kg
European Cadets Championships
Gold medal – first place	2004 Istanbul	63 kg
Representing Moscow Oblast
Russian National Championships
Gold medal – first place	2006 Nishnevartovsk	74 kg
Gold medal – first place	2009 Kazan	74 kg
Gold medal – first place	2010 Volgograd	74 kg
Gold medal – first place	2012 St.Petersburg	74 kg
Gold medal – first place	2014 Yakutsk	74 kg
Silver medal – second place	2016 Yakutsk	74 kg
Bronze medal – third place	2007 Moscow	74 kg
Bronze medal – third place	2008 St.Petersburg	74 kg
Bronze medal – third place	2013 Krasnoyarsk	74 kg
Golden Grand Prix Ivan Yarygin
Gold medal – first place	2010 Krasnoyarsk	74 kg
Gold medal – first place	2012 Krasnoyarsk	74 kg

Denís Tsargúsh (Abkhaz: Дени́с Царгәы́ш, IPA /dɛˈnis t͡sʰɑrˈgʷɨʂ/, born 1 September 1987, also known as Dinislam Tsargush), is a Russian freestyle wrestler. He is a three-time European Champion, three-time World Champion and also won a bronze medal at the 2012 Summer Olympics. He is a Grand Master of Sports in Freestyle Wrestling.

He won the 74 kg weight class at the 2009, 2010 and 2014 FILA Wrestling World Championships.

He won the bronze medal at the 2012 Summer Olympics in the men's 74 kg category. At the 2014 World Wrestling Championships in the men's 74 kg category, Tsargush scored a 9–2 victory over Jordan Burroughs (U.S.), who had won the last three world level titles at the weight class, from 2011 to 2013. Tsargush also won a world championship at the junior level in 2007.

== Championships and accomplishments ==
- Olympic Bronze medal (London 2012)
- Three-time World champion (2009, 2010, 2014)
- Five time Russian nationals
- Two-time winner Golden Grand Prix Ivan Yarygin (2010, 2012)
- Three-time European champion (2010, 2011, 2012)
- Gold medalist in 2013 Summer Universiade (Kazan, Tatarstan)
- Winner Golden Grand prix Yaşar Doğu 2015 (Istanbul, Turkey)
