= Gábor Hatos =

Hungarian freestyle wrestler

Medal record

Men's freestyle wrestling

Representing Hungary

Olympic Games
Bronze medal – third place	2012 London	74 kg

World Championships
Bronze medal – third place	2010 Moscow	74 kg

European Championships
Silver medal – second place	2013 Tbilisi	74 kg
Bronze medal – third place	2006 Moscow	74 kg

Gábor Hatos (born 3 October 1983 in Eger) is a male freestyle wrestler from Hungary.

He originally placed fifth at the 2012 Summer Olympics in the men's 74 kg category but was promoted to the bronze medal on 7 November 2012 after the disqualification of Uzbek Soslan Tigiev for doping.
