= Matt Gentry =

Canadian-American wrestler (born 1982)

Personal information
- Full name: Matthew Judah Gentry
- Nickname: Moose
- Nationality: United States; Canada
- Born: July 30, 1982 (age 43) Grants Pass, Oregon, U.S.
- Home town: Burnaby, British Columbia, Canada
- Height: 5 ft 9 in (1.75 m)
- Weight: 74 kg (163 lb)

Sport
- Sport: Wrestling
- Events: Freestyle and Folkstyle
- College team: Stanford
- Club: Burnaby Mountain Wrestling Club
- Coached by: Dave McKay (national)
Medal record
Men's freestyle wrestling
Representing Canada
Pan American Games
| Bronze medal – third place | 2007 Rio de Janeiro | 74 kg |
| Bronze medal – third place | 2011 Guadalajara | 74 kg |
Men's collegiate wrestling
Representing the Stanford Cardinal
NCAA Division I Championships
| Gold medal – first place | 2004 St. Louis | 157 lb |

Matthew Judah Gentry (born July 30, 1982) is a Canadian-American former wrestler. Although Gentry was born in the United States, he represented Canada at the Olympic Games due to holding dual citizenship. He participated in the Men's freestyle 74 kg at the 2008 Summer Olympics and in the Men's freestyle 74 kg at the 2012 Summer Olympics, where he finished 5th.

A quarterfinalist at the 2008 Beijing Olympics, Gentry qualified for his second consecutive Olympic Games appearance by winning gold at the FILA Pan American Olympic qualifier in Kissimmee, Florida defeating Francisco Soler of Puerto Rico in the finals 6–0, 7–0.

Matt Gentry attended college at Stanford University, graduating in 2004 with a degree in human biology. As an undergraduate he was one of the most successful wrestlers in school history, going 42–0 in 2004 at 157 lbs; that undefeated season made him Stanford's first NCAA champion in wrestling. Gentry has helped serve as a collegiate wrestling coach following his time as a competitor.

Gentry came off a 2011 season that saw him capture a national title in his weight class and win bronze at the Pan American Games in Guadalajara. Overall, Gentry has won three national titles (2006, 2007, 2011) and two Pan American Games bronze medals (2007, 2011).
