= Soslan Tigiev =

Russian and Uzbekistani wrestler (born 1983)

Medal record

Representing Uzbekistan

Men's freestyle wrestling

Olympic Games
Disqualified	2008 Beijing	74 kg
Disqualified	2012 London	74 kg

Asian Games
Bronze medal – third place	2006 Doha	74 kg

Soslan Tigiev (born October 12, 1983 in Vladikavkaz) is a Russian and Uzbekistani wrestler who competed in the freestyle 74 kg category. He was the 2006 Asian Games bronze medalist. Tigiev was initially awarded a silver medal at the 2008 Summer Olympics in Beijing and a bronze medal at the 2012 Summer Olympics in London. His 2012 Olympic medal was stripped on November 7, 2012 after he tested positive for the banned stimulant methylhexaneamine. He was stripped of his 2008 Olympic medal in 2016 after dehydrochlormethyltestosterone (turinabol) was found during retesting of his samples from Beijing.
