= Murad Gaidarov =

Belarusian wrestler (born 1980)

Medal record

Men's freestyle wrestling

Representing Belarus

Olympic Games
Silver medal – second place	2008 Beijing	74 kg

World Championships
Silver medal – second place	2003 New York	74 kg

World Cup
Gold medal – first place	2010 Moscow	74 kg

European Championships
Silver medal – second place	2014 Vantaa	86 kg
Bronze medal – third place	2009 Vilnius	74 kg
Silver medal – second place	2008 Tampere	74 kg
Silver medal – second place	2004 Ankara	74 kg
Bronze medal – third place	2003 Riga	74 kg
Silver medal – second place	2002 Baku	74 kg

Murad Gaidarov (Belarusian: Мурад Гайдараў, Russian: Мурад Гайдаров; born February 13, 1980), is a Belarusian wrestler. Gaidarov was disqualified from 2004 Summer Olympics for retaliating after he was defeated at the quarterfinals and assaulted his opponent, Buvaisar Saitiev, off the arena floor. Gaidarov won the bronze medal in men's 74 kg freestyle wrestling at the 2008 Summer Olympics, but after a failed drug test by Soslan Tigiev, he was awarded the silver medal. His elder brother Gaidar Gaidarov is second coach of Dagestan wrestling team and the Italian national team.

He began coaching Indian wrestler Deepak Punia in 2018. He was dismissed from his position by the Wrestling Federation of India in 2021 after assaulting a referee at the 2020 Summer Olympics in Tokyo. He was expelled from the Games by the IOC.
