= Kiril Terziev =

Bulgarian freestyle wrestler

Medal record

Men's freestyle wrestling

Representing Bulgaria

Olympic Games
| Bronze medal – third place | 2008 Beijing | 74 kg |

Kiril Stoychev Terziev (Bulgarian: Кирил Стойчев Терзиев; born 1 September 1983, in Petrich) is a Bulgarian freestyle wrestler. He won a bronze medal at the 2008 Summer Olympics in Beijing in his category (up to 74 kg).

He is a representative for Bulgarian company TRYMAX.
