= Krystian Brzozowski =

Polish freestyle wrestler

Medal record

Representing Poland

Men's Freestyle Wrestling

European Wrestling Championships
Bronze medal – third place	2006 Moscow	74 kg
Bronze medal – third place	2014 Vantaa	74 kg

Summer Universiade
Silver medal – second place	2005 İzmir	74kg

Krystian Brzozowski (born 20 February 1982 in Namysłów) is a male freestyle wrestler from Poland. He participated in men's freestyle 74 kg at 2008 Summer Olympics. He was eliminated in the 1/16 of final losing with Arsen Gitinov.

Brzozowski participated in M men's freestyle 74 kg at 2004 Summer Olympics as well. He was ranked on 4th place.

He won two bronze medals at 2006 European Wrestling Championships and 2014 European Wrestling Championships.
