= Jordan Burroughs =

American wrestler (born 1988)

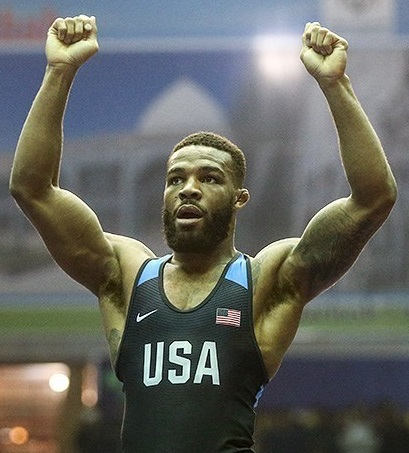
- Burroughs in the 2017 Wrestling World Cup

Personal information
- Full name: Jordan Ernest Burroughs
- Born: July 8, 1988 (age 38) Camden, New Jersey, U.S.
- Height: 5 ft 7 in (170 cm)
- Weight: 174 lb (79 kg)
- Website: jordanburroughs.com

Sport
- Country: United States
- Sport: Wrestling
- Events: Freestyle and Folkstyle
- College team: Nebraska
- Club: Sunkist Kids Wrestling Club
- Team: USA
- Turned pro: 2011
- Coached by: Mark Manning; Brandon Slay
Medal record
Men's freestyle wrestling
Representing the United States
Olympic Games
Gold medal – first place	2012 London	74 kg
World Championships
Gold medal – first place	2011 Istanbul	74 kg
Gold medal – first place	2013 Budapest	74 kg
Gold medal – first place	2015 Las Vegas	74 kg
Gold medal – first place	2017 Paris	74 kg
Gold medal – first place	2021 Oslo	79 kg
Gold medal – first place	2022 Belgrade	79 kg
Bronze medal – third place	2014 Tashkent	74 kg
Bronze medal – third place	2018 Budapest	74 kg
Bronze medal – third place	2019 Nur-Sultan	74 kg
Pan American Games
Gold medal – first place	2011 Guadalajara	74 kg
Gold medal – first place	2015 Toronto	74 kg
Gold medal – first place	2019 Lima	74 kg
Pan American Championships
Gold medal – first place	2014 Mexico City	74 kg
Gold medal – first place	2016 Frisco	74 kg
Gold medal – first place	2019 Buenos Aires	74 kg
Gold medal – first place	2020 Ottawa	74 kg
Gold medal – first place	2022 Acapulco	79 kg
Gold medal – first place	2023 Buenos Aires	79 kg
Yasar Dogu Tournament
Gold medal – first place	2016 Istanbul	74 kg
Gold medal – first place	2019 Istanbul	74 kg
Gold medal – first place	2022 Istanbul	79 kg
Gold medal – first place	2024 Antalya	74 kg
Silver medal – second place	2018 Istanbul	74 kg
Bronze medal – third place	2014 Istanbul	74 kg
Grand Prix
Gold medal – first place	2012 Habana	74 kg
Gold medal – first place	2013 Minsk	74 kg
Gold medal – first place	2013 Vanadzor	74 kg
Gold medal – first place	2015 Minsk	74 kg
Gold medal – first place	2016 Dortmund	74 kg
Gold medal – first place	2017 Madrid	74 kg
Silver medal – second place	2021 Rome	74 kg
US Open Championships
Gold medal – first place	2011 Cleveland	74 kg
Gold medal – first place	2013 Las Vegas	74 kg
Gold medal – first place	2014 Las Vegas	74 kg
Gold medal – first place	2017 Las Vegas	74 kg
Men's collegiate wrestling
Representing the Nebraska Cornhuskers
NCAA Division I Championships
Gold medal – first place	2009 St. Louis	157 lb
Gold medal – first place	2011 Philadelphia	165 lb
Bronze medal – third place	2008 St. Louis	149 lb
Big 12 Championships
Gold medal – first place	2008 Stillwater	149 lb
Gold medal – first place	2009 Lincoln	157 lb
Gold medal – first place	2011 Ames	165 lb
Bronze medal – third place	2007 Columbia	149 lb

Jordan Ernest Burroughs (born July 8, 1988) is an American freestyle wrestler and former folkstyle wrestler. He won the gold medal in the men's freestyle 74 kg event at the 2012 Summer Olympics and has won six world titles in freestyle wrestling.

Burroughs has won world championships at 74 kg in 2011, 2013, 2015 and 2017, and at 79 kg in 2021 and 2022. He has also won three Pan American Games gold medals and multiple Pan American Wrestling Championships titles. USA Wrestling lists him as winning the most World and Olympic titles in United States wrestling history with seven.

In collegiate wrestling, Burroughs competed for the Nebraska Cornhuskers, winning NCAA Division I national championships in 2009 and 2011. He received the Dan Hodge Trophy in 2011.

== Early life ==
Burroughs is from the Sicklerville section of Winslow Township, New Jersey. When he was in elementary school, he brought a wrestling flyer home and became the first member of his family to ever wrestle, at the age of five.

He attended Winslow Township High School, where he was a three-sport athlete in wrestling, football, and track. He dreamed of playing in the NFL as a wide receiver, but decided to focus on wrestling, weighing 130-pounds as a freshman.

As a high school wrestler, Burroughs was a three-time district champion, two-time regional champion, a New Jersey state champion, and an NHSCA national champion during his senior year in 2006. He graduated with 115 wins and 20 losses.

== College career ==
In 2006, he accepted a scholarship to the University of Nebraska–Lincoln as the 52nd-ranked senior in the nation.

=== 2006–07 ===
Burroughs freshman year ended with 16 wins and 13 losses. He was also an NCAA qualifier and placed third at the Big 12 Conference championships.

=== 2007–08 ===
For his sophomore year in college, he made adjustments with which he finished regular season with a 34–6 record. He also set a single-season record, scoring 98 dual takedowns and surrendering just seven on the year, marking one of UNL's best sophomore seasons. As the top-seed at the Big 12 Championships, Burroughs made his way to the title with technical fall and major decisions and was also named the Outstanding Wrestler of the tournament. At the NCAAs, he capped three victories up until the semifinals, where he was downed by Hawkeyes' legend Brent Metcalf. He placed third after defeating J.P. O'Connor and Josh Churella in his last matches of the season, claiming All-American honors.

=== 2008–09 ===
During his junior year he won the Cliff Keen title (with wins over returning AA J.P. O'Connor of Harvard and defending NCAA champion Jordan Leen of Cornell), where he was named the Outstanding Wrestler. He also broke the school's single-season dual takedown record for the second straight year with 117 in 19 duals, only giving up one himself, to future three-time Bellator MMA World Champion Michael Chandler. Burroughs then claimed his second Big 12 title with wins over Oklahoma State's Neil Erisman and once again over Chandler. Entering as an undefeated (34–0) top-seed, he claimed his first NCAA title by beating fellow undefeated (17–0) second-seed Mike Poeta in the finals. He also defeated future UFC fighter Gregor Gillespie in the semifinals.

=== 2009–10 ===
Burroughs was having a 7–0 regular season, including a single win at the Las Vegas Invitational against eventual Undisputed UFC Lightweight Champion Justin Gaethje (he forfeited the next matches due to an injury from the match), before suffering a season-ending injury at a dual match against Central Michigan's Steve Brown, where he dropped an overtime loss due to the injury. This led to a medical redshirt for the remainder of the year.

=== 2010–11 ===
Burroughs started his comeback senior season strong with a Harold Nichols Classic and Midlands Championships with a win over returning NCAA champion Andrew Howe in the finals, receiving the Dan Gable Most Outstanding Wrestler award due to his performance in the tournament. This capped a perfect 29–0 to finish the regular season. At the Big 12 championships, he defeated second-ranked in the country Tyler Caldwell 2–1 to claim the championship. At the NCAA tournament, he again defeated Caldwell in the finals to become a two-time national champion. He was awarded the Dan Hodge Trophy as the best collegiate wrestler in the country after an undefeated season. He graduated with 128 wins and 20 losses overall, 13 of those coming in his first year.

== Freestyle career ==
=== 2007 ===
Burroughs made his senior-level debut at the US University Nationals on April, where he placed second to Teyon Ware.

=== 2011 ===
Just three weeks after graduating from college, Burroughs made an immediate jump into the freestyle scene, competing at the US Open on April 7–10. He dismantled all of his four opponents (including Nick Marable and Bobby Nash) to claim the championship.

On May 5, he defeated Aniuar Geduev from Russia, at the annual Beat the Streets dual. At the US World Team Trials of June 9–11, Burroughs defeated US University National Champion Andrew Howe twice in a row to become the US World Team Member at 74 kilograms. He then won the Ukrainian Memorial International tournament on July 23–24, winning every period of his five matches and coming out with a notable victory over Musa Murtazaliev.

At the World Championships on September 18, Burroughs was able to make a 5–0 mark in the stacked weight class, defeating the likes of two-time and defending World Champion Denis Tsargush, Central American and Caribbean Games champion Ricardo Roberty, Military World medalist Ashraf Aliyev and Sadegh Goudarzi, 10' World Silver medalist and Asian Games champion. By this result, Burroughs became the third Cornhusker to win a world title for the United States.

To close the year, the recently crowned World Champion won his first Pan American Games title on October 24, after running through all of his three opponents.

=== 2012 ===
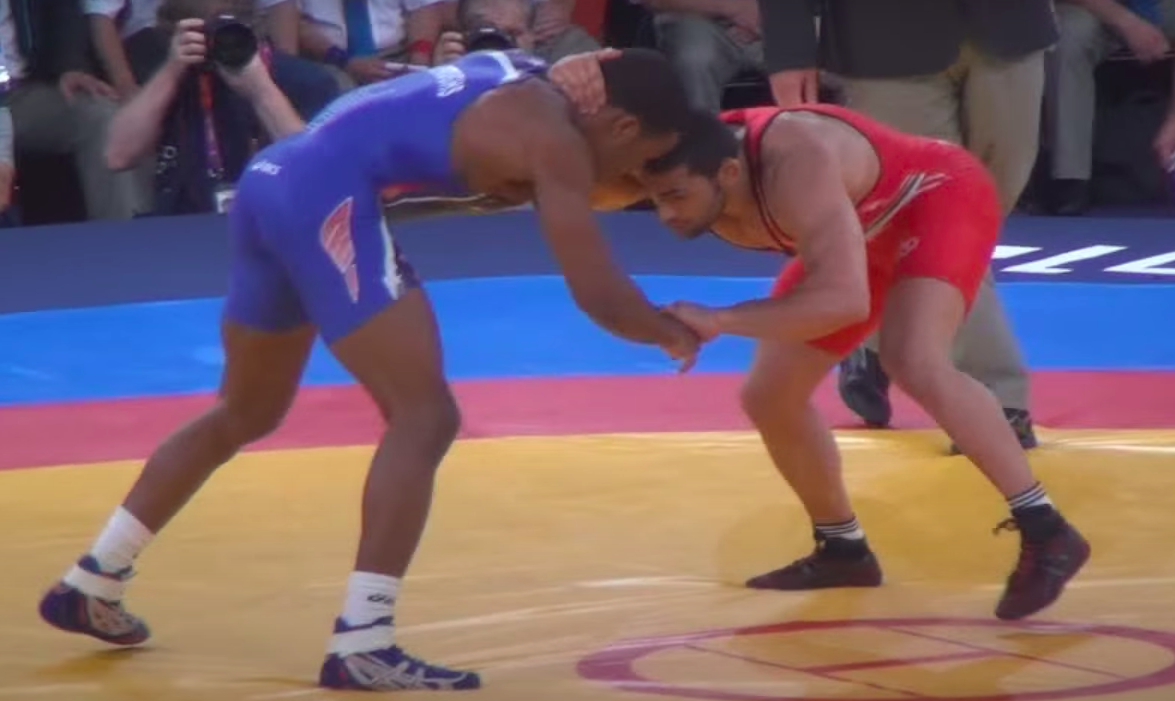
Burroughs wrestling Sadegh Goudarzi at the 2012 Summer Olympics in London, England.

Burroughs started off his legendary year by winning the Dave Schultz Memorial International on February 1–4, where he defeated the likes of Tyler Caldwell and Trent Paulson. He travelled to Cuba for the Cerro Pelado International on February 14–15, where he once again claimed the gold medal, now with victories over Nick Marable and Paulson. On April 21, he claimed the US Olympic spot at 74 kilograms after downing Andrew Howe once, as he was forced to forfeit the next match.

Burroughs was selected to represent the United States at the World Cup on May 12–13. He collected notable wins for his resume after beating the likes of Akhmed Gadzhimagomedov, Sohsuke Takatani, Sadegh Goudarzi and Davit Khutsishvili, to claim gold. He also dominated Russia's Kamel Malikov at the annual Beat the Streets.

At the 2012 Summer Olympics of London on August 10, Burroughs opened up with a dominant 4–0, 6–0 performance over Francisco Soler from Puerto Rico and followed up with a 2–1, 1–1 score over Matt Gentry from Canada, to advance to the semifinals. In the semis, he took out two–time World Champion and three-time European champion Denis Tsargush from Russia, in a rough 3–1, 0–2, 2–1 to advance to the final, where he shut down the highly accomplished Sadegh Goudarzi from Iran, 1–0, 1–0, to claim his Olympic gold medal.

=== 2013 ===
The newly crowned Olympic champion, Burroughs won his second World Cup on February 21–22, defeating Sohsuke Takatani, Ezzatollah Akbari, and Ali Shabanau. On March 1–2, he also won the Alexander Medved Prizes International title.

On April 17–19, he came back to the national circuit to claim his second US Open title, defeating Penn State legend David Taylor in the process. He then defeated Saba Khubezhty in two different duals, the first one at the Rumble on the Rails and the second one at Beat the Streets, on May 15 and 19 respectively.

Burroughs made his second US World Team on June 21–23, when he defeated recent graduate and four-time NCAA champion Kyle Dake twice, remaining un-scored (7–0) in the first match and going to overtime (8–6) in the second. He then warmed up with a Stepan Sargsyan International title on August 3–4, compiling four more victories to his streak.

Four weeks prior to the World Championships, Burroughs broke his ankle, however, he was once again victorious at the tournament, now in even more dominant fashion. He outscored his opposition 34–3, and recorded technical falls in three of his five matches (including Narsingh Yadav and Jabrayil Hasanov), the two remaining being a disqualification win against Ali Shabanau and a 4–0 match in the finale against Ezzatollah Akbari, to crown himself as a two-time World Champion.

In 2014, Burroughs received the 2013 John Smith Award as USA Wrestling's Freestyle Wrestler of the Year.

=== 2014 ===
Burroughs travelled to Turkey to compete at the Yasar Dogu on February 15–16, where he won over Rashid Kurbanov (6–0) and Pürevjavyn Önörbat (TF 10–0) before his legendary 70-match win streak and undefeated 70–0 record since crossing over to freestyle full-time were broken by Nick Marable, in a 4–4 loss. He went on to claim the bronze medal.

Despite his streak being snapped, Burroughs continued to dominate his opposition, next representing the United States at the World Cup on March 15–16, where he got two falls (one over Parveen Rana), two tech falls and one 7–1 decision over Ezzatollah Akbari, helping the United States reach third-place and claiming his second individual World Cup. He also claimed his third US Open title on April 15–19, after defeating two-time Dan Hodge Trophy winner David Taylor in an exciting finale. Before the US WTT, Burroughs pinned Russia's Atsamaz Sanakoev on May 7 at Beat the Streets.

At the US World Team Trials of May 31–June 1, Burroughs defeated Taylor for the third and fourth times in his senior career to secure the spot, the first a fairly dominant performance by the Olympic gold medalist (6–2) and the second as close as the US Open's match between the two (6–5). To warm up, Burroughs competed in Mexico City and claimed a Pan American title on July 15–17, while defeating the accomplished Liván López from Cuba in the finals.

At the World Championships of September 8–14, Burroughs advanced to the semifinals without much problem, beating four-time African Champion Augusto Midana (spraining his MCL throughout the match) and Rashid Kurbanov, who would go on to win the Asian Games Gold medal 20 days later. Despite initial success in the tournament, he was unable to secure his fourth consecutive World/Olympic title, as he was downed by Denis Tsargush 2–9, but captured the bronze medal by pinning Rustam Dudaiev from Ukraine. The loss to Tsargush marked the first time he had been defeated by an international wrestler in over 60 international matches.

=== 2015 ===
Burroughs came back to competition on March 6–7 at the Alexander Medved Prizes International. He made his way to the gold medal in the stacked bracket, defeating Rashid Kurbanov, Ali Shabanau, and Jakob Makarashvili in the process.

Burroughs then competed on April 11–12 at the 15' World Cup. He powered through Cuba's Liván López, Russia's Iakubali Shikhdzhamalov, Mongolia's Pürevjavyn Önörbat and Iran's Morteza Rezaei Ghaleh to claim his fourth straight World Cup. He also downed Luis Quintana in his fifth-consecutive appearance at Beat the Streets, now on May 12. At the US World Team Trials of June 12–14, Burroughs defeated the challenger Kyle Dake twice, winning by decision in the first match (6–3) and dismantling the later 15' US National champion with a technical fall (14–4). To warm up, Burroughs won his second Pan American Games title on July 18, defeating Liván López (for the third time in his career), Jevon Balfour and Yoan Blanco.

At the World Championships of September 12, Burroughs had a tough six-match run, being dominant on his way to the semifinals (scores of 5–2, TF 10–0, TF 11–0, 5–0) before bumping into European Games champion Aniuar Geduev, whom he was able to defeat in a close 4–3 match. At the finals, Burroughs outclassed his opponent Pürevjavyn Önörbat with a technical fall to help the United States place second at the tournament.

=== 2016 ===
To start off the Olympic year, Burroughs won his second Yasar Dogu gold medal February 4–6, racking up notable wins over Soner Demirtaş and Zelimkhan Khadjiev. He also won his second Pan American title on February 26–28, with dominant performances at the tournament. At the 2016 US Olympic Team Trials of April 10, Burroughs dismantled 12' opponent Andrew Howe with a 9–3 in the first match and a technical fall in the second to make his second Olympic Team. He also competed at Beat the Streets for the sixth time, now on May 19 against 15' Asian Champion Peyman Yarahmadi, whom he almost tech'd with an 11–2 score.

Burroughs was then expected to compete at the World Cup on June 11–12, however, he chose to withdraw from the tournament as the birth of his second child was coming up. Burroughs won his last tournament before the Summer Olympics at the Germany Grand Prix, on July 2, soundly defeating Bekzod Abdurakhmonov and Martin Obst.

On August 19, Burroughs competed at the 2016 Summer Olympics, entering the tournament as a heavy-favorite to win his second gold medal. After an 8–3 win in the Round of 16 against eight-time African Championships medalist Augusto Midana, he wrestled Aniuar Geduev (whom he was 2–0 against) in the quarterfinals. After a match full of emotions, Burroughs was violently upset with a close 2–3 loss, which stunned the United States and sent him to the consolation bracket. At the consolation semifinals, Burroughs was defeated in an impressive fashion, as Bekzod Abdurakhmonov (whom he had comfortably beaten a month prior) was able to pick up the win by technical fall over the American. After being sent home, an emotional Burroughs with tears on his eyes, stated:

"I left my wife at home with two kids in Nebraska for long periods of time to go to training camps and tournaments in foreign countries, but she did that joyfully, not begrudgingly, because she knew on days like these I always performed. Now I feel like I let her down and I let my family down."

=== 2017 ===
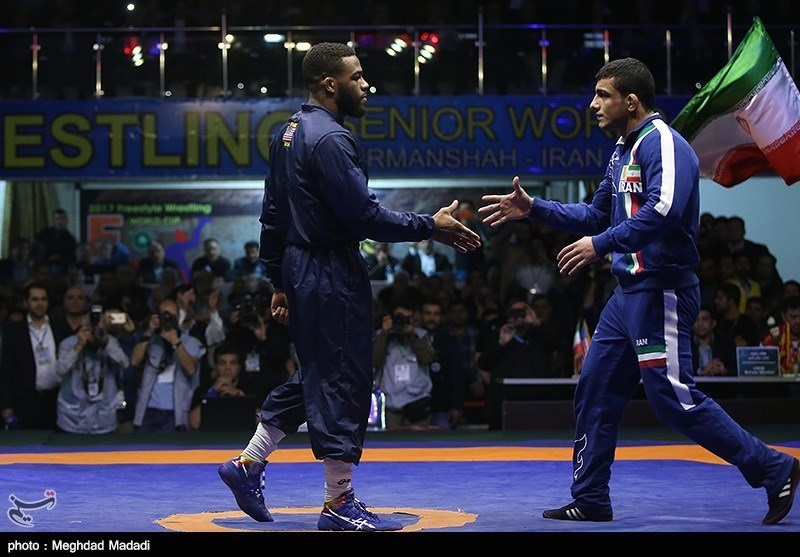
Burroughs at the 2017 Wrestling World Cup in Kermanshah, Iran.

After a long lay-off, Burroughs came back to the scene at the World Cup on February 16–17, where he was able to put his name back on notice once with four victories over foreigner opponents. He then went back to the National scene, as he competed at the US Open on April 26–29. At the tournament, he outscored his opponents 32 points to 2 up until the finals, where he was able to edge long-time rival Kyle Dake with a 2–2 criteria win to claim his fourth US Open title. On May 17, he defeated Sohsuke Takatani at Beat the Streets.

Burroughs then faced his US Open opponent Kyle Dake at the US World Team Trials on June 9–10. He lost the first match of the best-of-three via criteria, 6–6, but was able to conquer the spot in the two following bouts with convincing decisions, 8–4 and 6–2. He travelled to Madrid to compete at the Spain Grand Prix on July 15–16, where he picked up four victories and notable ones over Taimuraz Friev and Jevon Balfour, winning all of his matches with the same score, 10–0.

At the World Championships of August 26, Burroughs had a tough challenge in the first round, despite defeating the two-time World Championship bronze medalist Ali Shabanau with a close score of 7–5. He then advanced to the second round and quarterfinals, where he tech'd his opposition, downing his BTS opponent Sohsuke Takatani with a score of 12–2 and Zelimkhan Khadjiev with a score of 13–2, respectively. He then proclaimed redemption at Bekzod Abdurakhmonov, whom he was tech'd by at the Olympics, with a score of 6–5 to pass on to the finale. At the finals, he faced Russian National Champion Khetag Tsabolov and was able to beat him 9–6 to reclaim his throne at 74 kilograms .

After his World Championship run, Burroughs was named a Comeback Wrestler of the Year by United World Wrestling on December 27.

=== 2018 ===
Burroughs started off the year by winning his sixth World Cup on April 7–8 at Iowa City, Iowa, bumping up his record at such tournament to 27–0 and clinching the team title for Team USA. He then faced Frank Chamizo for the first time, going to a close come-from-behind 6–5 decision win, giving birth to one of the best rivalries in recent wrestling history.

He then made his eight World or Olympic team on June 8–9, at the '18 Final X: Lincoln, where he was the crowd favorite. He did so by defeating US Open champion and NCAA legend Isaiah Martinez, with a 4–1 score in the first match and a case-closing 11–1 technical fall in the second. Burroughs took a trip to Istanbul, Turkey to compete at the Yasar Dogu tournament on July 27–29, where he made the finale comfortably, to face Frank Chamizo. In a high-scoring match packed with action, Burroughs found himself defeated by the Italian via criteria, 10–10 to make the series a tie and claim his first silver medal in his entire freestyle career since crossing over.

At the World Championships of October 20–21, he defeated Mostafa Hosseinkhani from Iran in the opening round, 4–3, but suffered an upset in the quarterfinals to two-time and reigning Russian National champion and eventual winner of the championship Zaurbek Sidakov in a close 5–6 loss. However, he came back in the consolation semis, where he defeated Miroslav Kirov from Belarus by a 9–0 decision. At the bronze medal match, he faced Frank Chamizo and was able to break the tie with a 4–4 criteria win to claim the third-place, therefore his sixth medal from Worlds.

=== 2019 ===
Burroughs started off his athletic year in Bulgaria, at the Dan Kolov – Nikola Petrov Memorial of February 28 to March 3. In this tournament, he beat Frank Chamizo once again with a convincing 9–2 win and also got a notable victory over Bekzod Abdurakhmonov to claim the championship. On April 19–21 Burroughs competed at his first Pan American Championships since 2016, and was able to claim his third title with notable victories over Franklin Gómez and Jevon Balfour.

On May 6, Burroughs competed at Beat the Streets against UFC undefeated star and former Dan Hodge Trophy winner Ben Askren. He was able to outclass the long-time retired wrestler via 11–0 technical fall. On June 14–15, Burroughs made his seventh US World Team by claiming the spot at 19' Final X: Lincoln. Just like last year, he faced Isaiah Martinez, World Cup champion and two-time US Open champion, who pushed Burroughs to a closer series to last year's. In the first match, Burroughs won a close 5–4 decision, but was defeated via criteria in the second match (5–5) and was forced to come back with a dominant 7–1 to claim the series.

On July 11–14, Burroughs claimed his second Yasar Dogu title, beating 18' U23 World champion Tajmuraz Salkazanov and Yakup Gör in the process. In the finals, he was scheduled to face Frank Chamizo, however, Chamizo pulled out of the bout and Burroughs claimed gold. On August 10, Burroughs took home his third Pan American games title with notable wins over Geandry Garzón and Franklin Gómez, helping to clinch the team title for the United States.

At the World Championships of September 20–21, Burroughs started off with two close victories, coming from behind in both of them and winning 11–10 and 6–4 respectively. He then picked up a solid win to make his way into the semifinals, where he was once again stopped by Zaurbek Sidakov by one point scored in the last second in a 3–4 match, forcing him to compete for the bronze medal. In the third-place match, he was able to defeat Mao Okui with a dominant 10–0 technical fall.

=== 2020 ===
On March 6–9, Burroughs claimed his fourth Pan American Championship with dominant scores of 10–0, 3–0 and 8–1 over Jorge Llano, Geandry Garzón and Franklin Gómez.

Burroughs was scheduled to compete at the '20 US Olympic Team Trials on April 4 at State College, Pennsylvania. However, the event was postponed for 2021 along with the Summer Olympics due to the COVID-19 pandemic, leaving all the qualifiers unable to compete.

After months of not being able to compete due to the COVID-19 pandemic, Burroughs wrestled two-time NCAA champion and '19 US National Champion at 86 kilos Zahid Valencia, at a catchweight of 185 pounds in the headline of FloWrestling: Burroughs vs. Valencia, on November 14. At the weigh-ins, Burroughs weighed 178.2 pounds, while Valencia marked 184.1 pounds on the scale. After being topped 0–4 in the first period, Burroughs overcame Valencia and took the lead, outscoring him 8–1 in the second period to mark the final score 8-5 and claim the dual.

=== 2021 ===
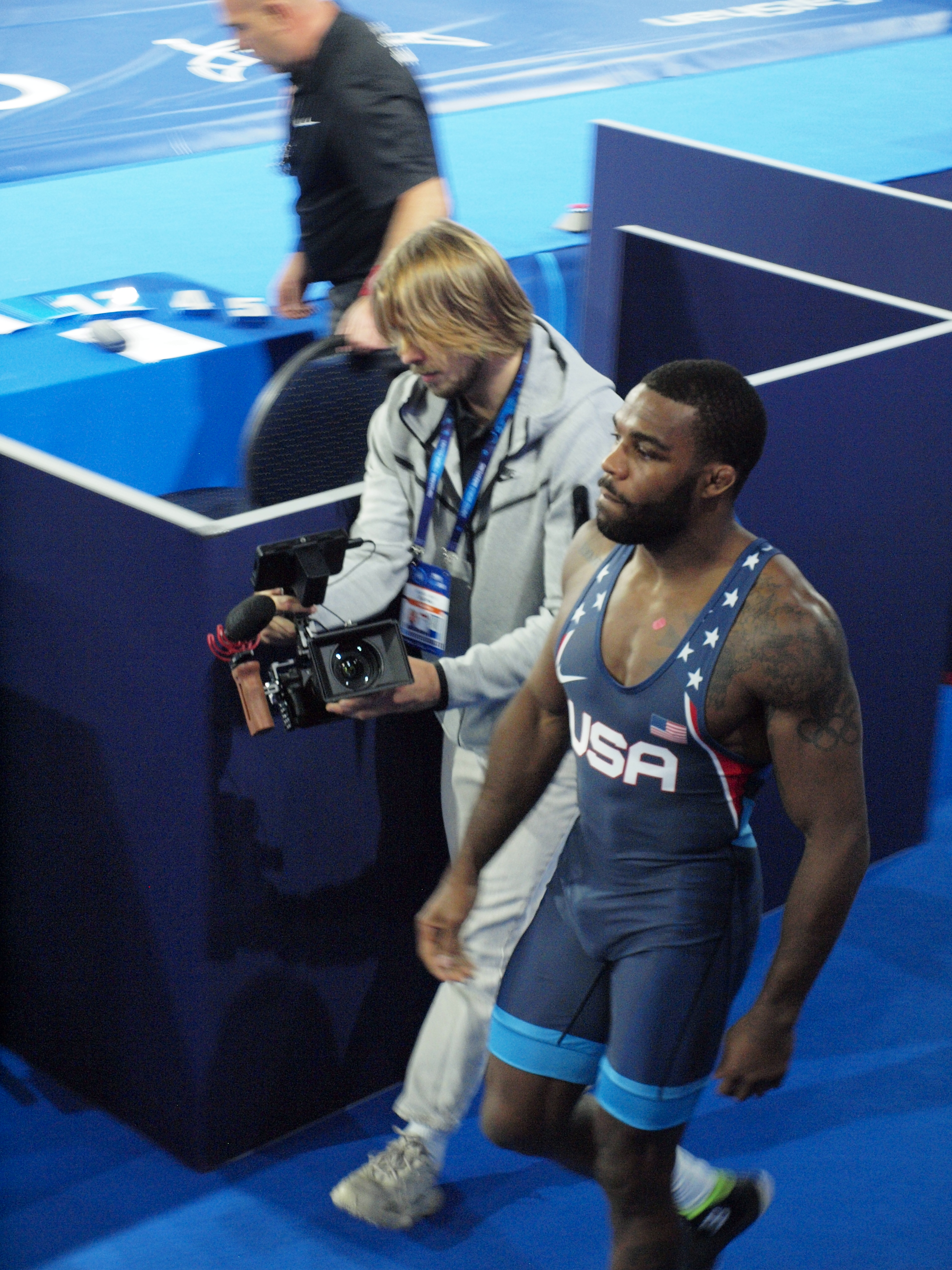
Burroughs at the 2021 World Wrestling Championships in Oslo, Norway.

After downing the number two-ranked 86 kilogram'er in the country, Burroughs had been booked to wrestle former rival and '18 World Champion David Taylor at 86 kilos, while headlining FloWrestling: Burroughs vs. Taylor, which would take place on January 9. However, it was announced on January 8 that Taylor was unable to travel to Austin, Texas due to COVID-19 restrictions and the bout was subsequently postponed for four days later and changed its location for Lincoln, Nebraska, thus moving to a different card also named FloWrestling: Burroughs vs. Taylor. After a 0-4 period, Burroughs rallied late to score four points of his own, but was unable to secure the victory as Taylor had criteria, defeating Burroughs for the first time in five matches.

After a full year without competing at 74 kilograms, Burroughs competed at the prestigious Matteo Pellicone Ranking Series. To make the finals, Burroughs shut down '20 Asian Continental Champion Daniyar Kaisanov and the accomplished Narsingh Yadav. In the finale, he faced two-time World Champion Frank Chamizo for the fifth time, and was edged in a close match by a point, marking the second time Burroughs had ever been defeated in a final (first loss was also handed by Chamizo) and claiming the silver medal.

In April 3, Burroughs competed at the rescheduled US Olympic Team Trials in an attempt to make his tenth straight US World/Olympic Team. Able to sit out as a 2019 World Championship medalist, Burroughs faced reigning and two–time World Champion at 79kg and former rival Kyle Dake in a best–of–three final. Both matches were similar and had the same result, with Dake coming out on top after seemingly shutting down the Olympic champion with the scores of 2–3 and 0–3. This marked the first time Burroughs was unable to make the US Olympic or World Team, ending a dominant nine–year long reign.

Burroughs had been set to wrestle former rival Isaiah Martinez on June 18 at Who's Number One, but on June 14, Martinez announced he would not be able to make the weight of 79 kilograms and the bout was cancelled.

After initial manifestation of moving up to 79 kilograms in April, Burroughs registered to bulk up and compete at the 2021 US World Team Trials on September 11–12 as the top-seed, intending to represent the country at the World Championships for the eight time. Burroughs showed immense longevity in his career while displaying his signature double leg throughout the tournament, dropping All-Americans Hayden Hidlay and Chance Marsteller as well as three-time NCAA champion Jason Nolf, advancing to the finals. In a best-of-three series, Burroughs downed another three-time NCAA champion in Alex Dieringer twice in a row in frenetic bouts, getting back on the top of the podium for the first time since March 2020. During his second match with Dieringer, Burroughs suffered a torn calf muscle, and he was told by the doctors that he would need eight weeks to recover, but still represented the United States at the 2021 World Championships from October 3 to 4 in Oslo, Norway, less than a month later.

To make his first World Championship final since 2017, Burroughs won four matches during the first date, including a close bout with two-time U23 European champion Radik Valiev. He topped Mohammad Nokhodi from Iran in the finals in order to capture the gold at the new weight class and become a five-time World Champion, cementing his legacy as one of the most accomplished American wrestlers of all time.

=== 2022 ===
After defeating Nestor Taffur at Bout at the Ballpark in February 12, Burroughs competed at the prestigious Yasar Dogu International on February 27, claiming the gold medal. On May 8, he swept the competition at the Pan American Championships to add a fifth title to his name. In June, he defeated two-time All-American Chance Marsteller at Final X: New York in a best-of-three, two matches to one to earn a trip to the World Championships.

On September, at the World Championships in Belgrade, Burroughs made the finals after four wins, including one over Asian champion Arsalan Budazhapov. In the finals, he once again knocked off Mohammad Nokhodi from Iran to claim his sixth World title.

In December, he competed at the World Cup, where after wins over Mongolia and Georgia, he was defeated by Iran's Ali Savadkouhi, marking the first time he had been defeated by an Iranian opponent in 16 bouts.

=== 2023 ===
To start off May, Burroughs grabbed his sixth Pan American title with a win over Jasmit Phulka in the finals. In June, he was defeated by Chance Marsteller at Final X: New York in a best-of-three, two matches to one, being denied his first US World Team since 2011.

In November, Burroughs made the move back down to 74 kilograms, and claimed the D.A. Kunaev International title with four dominant wins.

=== 2024 ===
In March, Burroughs made his first appearance of the year and swept the Yasar Dogu International field with four wins over foreign opponents to claim the gold medal.

In April, Burroughs competed at the US Olympic Team Trials, and reached the finals of the challenge tournament after wins over Pan American champion Alex Facundo and U20 World champion Mitchell Mesenbrink. Facing three-time NCAA champion Jason Nolf, Burroughs was defeated on points, ending his hopes of a run at the Summer Olympics.

In September, Burroughs went back up to 79 kilograms, and competed at the US World Team Trials. After first-day wins over NCAA champions Levi Haines and Alex Dieringer, Burroughs avenged losses to Chance Marsteller in the best-of-three finals to make his twelfth US World Team, and is now expected to compete at the World Championships in October.

In October, Burroughs competed at the World Championships, though after wins over U20 World champion Zelimkhan Khadjiev from France and Magomet Evloev from Tajikistan, he was eliminated by three-time World medalist Mohammad Nokhodi from Iran.

=== 2026 ===
In June 2026, Burroughs signed with Real American Freestyle, with his promotional debut scheduled for RAF 12 against Sean Brady on August 22, 2026.

== Personal life ==
Burroughs is a Christian. He has spoken about his faith saying, "A gold medal is always going to leave you empty. ... There's no other thing in life that's more fulfilling than a relationship with Jesus Christ. Contentment is one of the biggest things I've learned, knowing that regardless of where you are in life, it's all about being content with God's provision." Jordan is married to Lauren Burroughs (née Mariacher) and has five children, Beacon, Ora, Rise, Banner and Badge. Burroughs is a football fan and supports the Buffalo Bills.

Burroughs has cross-trained with several high-profile figures from the MMA community over the years and has often been linked with making a move to the sport, but publicly explained on an episode of the Joe Rogan Experience that he had decided against doing so on account of his wife, Lauren, and a general concern for maintaining his health.

In August 2024, he expressed support to Vinesh Phogat who was disqualified from the Paris Olympics and demanded the silver medal for her.

== Freestyle record ==
Freestyle matches
Res.	Record	Opponent	Score	Date	Event	Location
2024 World Championships 8th at 79 kg
Loss	246–20	(Iran) Mohammad Nokhodi	4–6	October 30–31, 2024	2024 World Championships	Tirana, Albania
Win	246–19	(Tajikistan) Magomet Evloev	4–2	October 30–31, 2024	2024 World Championships	Tirana, Albania
Win	245–19	(France) Zelimkhan Khadjiev	4–0	October 30–31, 2024	2024 World Championships	Tirana, Albania
2024 US World Team Trials (gold) at 79 kg
Win	244–19	(United States) Chance Marsteller	6–3	September 15, 2024	2024 US World Team Trials	(United States) Lincoln, Nebraska
Win	243–19	(United States) Chance Marsteller	3–0	September 15, 2024	2024 US World Team Trials	(United States) Lincoln, Nebraska
Win	242–19	(United States) Alex Dieringer	7–4	September 14, 2024	2024 US World Team Trials	(United States) Lincoln, Nebraska
Win	241–19	(United States) Levi Haines	4–1	September 14, 2024	2024 US World Team Trials	(United States) Lincoln, Nebraska
Win	240–19	(United States) Sam Beckett	TF 13–0	September 14, 2024	2024 US World Team Trials	(United States) Lincoln, Nebraska
2024 US Olympic Team Trials 4th at 74 kg
Loss	239–19	(United States) Jason Nolf	0–3	April 19, 2024	2024 US Olympic Team Trials	(United States) State College, Pennsylvania
Win	239–18	(United States) Mitchell Mesenbrink	8–3	April 19, 2024	2024 US Olympic Team Trials	(United States) State College, Pennsylvania
Win	238–18	(United States) Alex Facundo	5–3	April 19, 2024	2024 US Olympic Team Trials	(United States) State College, Pennsylvania
2024 Yasar Dogu (gold) at 74 kg
Win	237–18	(Tajikistan) Magomet Evloev	8–0	March 9, 2024	2024 Yasar Dogu International	Istanbul, Turkey
Win	236–18	(Kyrgyzstan) Orozobek Toktomambetov	5–1	March 9, 2024	2024 Yasar Dogu International	Istanbul, Turkey
Win	235–18	(Turkey) Muhammed Ozmuş	8–1	March 9, 2024	2024 Yasar Dogu International	Istanbul, Turkey
Win	234–18	(Azerbaijan) Murat E	9–2	March 9, 2024	2024 Yasar Dogu International	Istanbul, Turkey
2023 D.A. Kunaev International (gold) at 74 kg
Win	233–18	(Kazakhstan) Syrbaz Talgat	TF 15–4	November 3–4, 2023	2023 D.A. Kunaev International	Taraz, Kazakhstan
Win	232–18	(Kazakhstan) Yerbarys Satybaldy	TF 10–0	November 3–4, 2023	2023 D.A. Kunaev International	Taraz, Kazakhstan
Win	231–18	(Uzbekistan) Zafarbek Otakhonov	9–2	November 3–4, 2023	2023 D.A. Kunaev International	Taraz, Kazakhstan
Win	230–18	(Kazakhstan) Yerkhan Bexultanov	9–2	November 3–4, 2023	2023 D.A. Kunaev International	Taraz, Kazakhstan
2023 Final X NYC (silver) at 79 kg
Loss	229–18	(United States) Chance Marsteller	3–8	June 10, 2023	2023 Final X NYC	(United States) New York City, New York
Loss	229–17	(United States) Chance Marsteller	4–5	June 10, 2023	2023 Final X NYC	(United States) New York City, New York
Win	229–16	(United States) Chance Marsteller	3–3	June 10, 2023	2023 Final X NYC	(United States) New York City, New York
2023 Pan American Championships (gold) at 79 kg
Win	228–16	(Canada) Jasmit Phulka	TF 10–0	May 3–7, 2023	2023 Pan American Wrestling Championships	Buenos Aires, Argentina
Win	227–16	(Colombia) Nestor Barrios	TF 10–0	May 3–7, 2023	2023 Pan American Wrestling Championships	Buenos Aires, Argentina
Win	226–16	(Peru) Alexander Gomez	TF 10-0	May 3–7, 2023	2023 Pan American Wrestling Championships	Buenos Aires, Argentina
2022 World Cup (gold) at 79 kg
Loss	225–16	(Iran) Ali Savadkouhi	6–6	December 10–11, 2022	2022 World Cup	(United States) Coralville, Iowa
Win	225–15	(Georgia (country)) Vladimeri Gamkrelidze	5–3	December 10–11, 2022	2022 World Cup	(United States) Coralville, Iowa
Win	224–15	(Mongolia) Temuujin Mendbileg	TF 10–0	December 10–11, 2022	2022 World Cup	(United States) Coralville, Iowa
2022 World Championships (gold) at 79 kg
Win	223–15	(Iran) Mohammad Nokhodi	4–2	September 15–16, 2022	2022 World Championships	Belgrade, Serbia
Win	222–15	(Bulgaria) Ali Umarpashaev	9–2	September 15–16, 2022	2022 World Championships	Belgrade, Serbia
Win	221–15	(Kyrgyzstan) Arsalan Budazhapov	TF 10–0	September 15–16, 2022	2022 World Championships	Belgrade, Serbia
Win	220–15	(North Macedonia) Dejan Mitrov	TF 12–1	September 15–16, 2022	2022 World Championships	Belgrade, Serbia
Win	219–15	(Turkmenistan) Sahergeldi Saparmyradov	TF 12–1	September 15–16, 2022	2022 World Championships	Belgrade, Serbia
2022 Final X NYC (gold) at 79 kg
Win	218–15	(United States) Chance Marsteller	5–0	June 8, 2022	2022 Final X NYC	(United States) New York City, New York
Loss	217–15	(United States) Chance Marsteller	2–2	June 8, 2022	2022 Final X NYC	(United States) New York City, New York
Win	217–14	(United States) Chance Marsteller	4–0	June 8, 2022	2022 Final X NYC	(United States) New York City, New York
2022 Pan American Championships (gold) at 79 kg
Win	216–14	(Mexico) Miguel Ordenas	TF 10–0	May 8, 2022	2022 Pan American Wrestling Championships	Acapulco, Mexico
Win	215–14	(Colombia) Juan Rivera	TF 10–0	May 8, 2022	2022 Pan American Wrestling Championships	Acapulco, Mexico
Win	214–14	(Puerto Rico) Víctor Santos	Fall	May 8, 2022	2022 Pan American Wrestling Championships	Acapulco, Mexico
Win	213–14	(Canada) Samuel Barmish	TF 12–1	May 8, 2022	2022 Pan American Wrestling Championships	Acapulco, Mexico
2022 Yasar Dogu (gold) at 79 kg
Win	212–14	(United States) Chance Marsteller	8–0	February 27, 2022	2022 Yasar Dogu International	Istanbul, Turkey
Win	211–14	(Iran) Ali Savadkouhi	2–1	February 27, 2022	2022 Yasar Dogu International	Istanbul, Turkey
Win	210–14	(Russia) Gadzhimurad Alikhmaev	4–1	February 27, 2022	2022 Yasar Dogu International	Istanbul, Turkey
Win	209–14	(Kazakhstan) Zhiger Zakirov	TF 10–0	February 27, 2022	2022 Yasar Dogu International	Istanbul, Turkey
Win	208–14	(Kazakhstan) Meiir Koshkinbayev	TF 14–0	February 27, 2022	2022 Yasar Dogu International	Istanbul, Turkey
Win	207–14	(Colombia) Nestor Taffur	TF 11–0	February 13, 2022	2022 Bout at the Ballpark	(United States) Arlington, Texas
2021 World Championships (gold) at 79 kg
Win	206–14	(Iran) Mohammad Nokhodi	5–1	October 4, 2021	2021 World Championships	Oslo, Norway
Win	205–14	(Japan) Ryuki Yoshida	10–1	October 3, 2021	2021 World Championships	Oslo, Norway
Win	204–14	(Russia) Radik Valiev	9–4	October 3, 2021	2021 World Championships	Oslo, Norway
		(Kazakhstan) Bolat Sakayev	FF	October 3, 2021	2021 World Championships	Oslo, Norway
Win	203–14	(Canada) Sam Barmish	TF 10–0	October 3, 2021	2021 World Championships	Oslo, Norway
2021 US World Team Trials (gold) at 79 kg
Win	202–14	(United States) Alex Dieringer	4–3	September 12, 2021	2021 US World Team Trials	(United States) Lincoln, Nebraska
Win	201–14	(United States) Alex Dieringer	10–5	September 12, 2021	2021 US World Team Trials	(United States) Lincoln, Nebraska
Win	200–14	(United States) Jason Nolf	5–3	September 11, 2021	2021 US World Team Trials	(United States) Lincoln, Nebraska
Win	199–14	(United States) Chance Marsteller	4–1	September 11, 2021	2021 US World Team Trials	(United States) Lincoln, Nebraska
Win	198–14	(United States) Hayden Hidlay	7–3	September 11, 2021	2021 US World Team Trials	(United States) Lincoln, Nebraska
2020 US Olympic Team Trials (silver) at 74 kg
Loss	197–14	(United States) Kyle Dake	2–3	April 3, 2021	2020 US Olympic Team Trials	(United States) Fort Worth, Texas
Loss	197–13	(United States) Kyle Dake	0–3	April 3, 2021	2020 US Olympic Team Trials	(United States) Fort Worth, Texas
2021 Matteo Pellicone Ranking Series (silver) at 74 kg
Loss	197–12	(Italy) Frank Chamizo	2–3	March 7, 2021	Matteo Pellicone Ranking Series 2021	Rome, Italy
Win	197–11	(India) Narsingh Yadav	4–1	March 7, 2021	Matteo Pellicone Ranking Series 2021	Rome, Italy
Win	196–11	(Kazakhstan) Daniyar Kaisanov	5–0	March 7, 2021	Matteo Pellicone Ranking Series 2021	Rome, Italy
Loss	195–11	(United States) David Taylor	4–4	January 13, 2021	FloWrestling: Burroughs vs. Taylor	(United States) Lincoln, Nebraska
Win	195–10	(United States) Zahid Valencia	8–5	November 14, 2020	FloWrestling: Burroughs vs. Valencia	(United States) Austin, Texas
2020 Pan American Championships (gold) at 74 kg
Win	194–10	(Puerto Rico) Franklin Gómez	8–1	March 6–9, 2020	2020 Pan American Wrestling Championships	Ottawa, Canada
Win	193–10	(Cuba) Geandry Garzón	3–0	March 6–9, 2020	2020 Pan American Wrestling Championships	Ottawa, Canada
Win	192–10	(Argentina) Jorge Llano	TF 10–0	March 6–9, 2020	2020 Pan American Wrestling Championships	Ottawa, Canada
2019 World Championships (bronze) at 74kg
Win	191–10	(Japan) Mao Okui	TF 10–0	September 20–21, 2019	2019 World Wrestling Championships	Nur-Sultan, Kazakhstan
Loss	190–10	(Russia) Zaurbek Sidakov	3–4	September 20–21, 2019	2019 World Wrestling Championships	Nur-Sultan, Kazakhstan
Win	190–9	(Azerbaijan) Khadzhimurad Gadzhiyev	8–1	September 20–21, 2019	2019 World Wrestling Championships	Nur-Sultan, Kazakhstan
Win	189–9	(Hungary) Murad Kuramagomedov	6–4	September 20–21, 2019	2019 World Wrestling Championships	Nur-Sultan, Kazakhstan
Win	188–9	(Belarus) Azamat Nurykau	11–10	September 20–21, 2019	2019 World Wrestling Championships	Nur-Sultan, Kazakhstan
2019 Pan American Games (gold) at 74kg
Win	187–9	(Puerto Rico) Franklin Gómez	4–1	August 10, 2019	2019 Pan American Games	Lima, Peru
Win	186–9	(Cuba) Geandry Garzón	TF 15–4	August 10, 2019	2019 Pan American Games	Lima, Peru
Win	185–9	(Peru) Abel Herrera	TF 10–0	August 10, 2019	2019 Pan American Games	Lima, Peru
2019 Yaşar Doğu (gold) at 74kg
Win	184–9	(Turkey) Yakup Gör	TF 12–2	July 11–14, 2019	2019 Yaşar Doğu International	Istanbul, Turkey
Win	183–9	(Slovakia) Tajmuraz Salkazanov	6–4	July 11–14, 2019	2019 Yaşar Doğu International	Istanbul, Turkey
Win	182–9	(Hungary) Csaba Vida	TF 10–0	July 11–14, 2019	2019 Yaşar Doğu International	Istanbul, Turkey
2019 Final X: Lincoln (gold) at 74kg
Win	181–9	(United States) Isaiah Martinez	7–1	June 14–15, 2019	2019 US World Team Trials	(United States) Lincoln, Nebraska
Loss	180–9	(United States) Isaiah Martinez	5–5	June 14–15, 2019	2019 US World Team Trials	(United States) Lincoln, Nebraska
Win	180–8	(United States) Isaiah Martinez	5–4	June 14–15, 2019	2019 US World Team Trials	(United States) Lincoln, Nebraska
Win	179–8	(United States) Ben Askren	TF 11–0	May 6, 2019	2019 Beat The Streets: Grapple at the Garden	(United States) New York City
2019 Pan American Championships (gold) at 74kg
Win	178–8	(Canada) Jevon Balfour	7–0	April 19–21, 2019	2019 Pan American Wrestling Championships	Buenos Aires, Argentina
Win	177–8	(Venezuela) Adonis Arroyo	TF 10–0	April 19–21, 2019	2019 Pan American Wrestling Championships	Buenos Aires, Argentina
Win	176–8	(Puerto Rico) Franklin Gómez	5–2	April 19–21, 2019	2019 Pan American Wrestling Championships	Buenos Aires, Argentina
Win	175–8	(Ecuador) Freddy Vera	9–0	April 19–21, 2019	2019 Pan American Wrestling Championships	Buenos Aires, Argentina
2019 Dan Kolov – Nikola Petrov (gold) at 74kg
Win	174–8	(Uzbekistan) Bekzod Abdurakhmonov	4–3	February 28 – March 3, 2019	2019 Dan Kolov – Nikola Petrov Memorial	Ruse, Bulgaria
Win	173–8	(Bulgaria) Ali Umarpashaev	7–2	February 28 – March 3, 2019	2019 Dan Kolov – Nikola Petrov Memorial	Ruse, Bulgaria
Win	172–8	(Italy) Frank Chamizo	9–2	February 28 – March 3, 2019	2019 Dan Kolov – Nikola Petrov Memorial	Ruse, Bulgaria
Win	171–8	(India) Jitender	9–0	February 28 – March 3, 2019	2019 Dan Kolov – Nikola Petrov Memorial	Ruse, Bulgaria
2018 World Championships (bronze) at 74kg
Win	170–8	(Italy) Frank Chamizo	4–4	October 20–21, 2018	2018 World Wrestling Championships	Budapest, Hungary
Win	169–8	(Belarus) Miroslav Kirov	9–0	October 20–21, 2018	2018 World Wrestling Championships	Budapest, Hungary
Loss	168–8	(Russia) Zaurbek Sidakov	5–6	October 20–21, 2018	2018 World Wrestling Championships	Budapest, Hungary
Win	167–7	(Iran) Mostafa Hosseinkhani	4–3	October 20–21, 2018	2018 World Wrestling Championships	Budapest, Hungary
2018 Yaşar Doğu (silver) at 74kg
Loss	166–7	(Italy) Frank Chamizo	10–10	July 27–29, 2018	2018 Yaşar Doğu International	Istanbul, Turkey
Win	166–6	(Kazakhstan) Bolat Sakayev	9–4	July 27–29, 2018	2018 Yaşar Doğu International	Istanbul, Turkey
Win	165–6	(Belarus) Nurykan Azamat	TF 10–0	July 27–29, 2018	2018 Yaşar Doğu International	Istanbul, Turkey
Win	164–6	(Iraq) Saeed Zervanatareq	TF 10–0	July 27–29, 2018	2018 Yaşar Doğu International	Istanbul, Turkey
2018 Final X: Lincoln (gold) at 74kg
Win	163–6	(United States) Isaiah Martinez	TF 11–1	June 8–9, 2018	2018 US World Team Trials	(United States) Lincoln, Nebraska
Win	162–6	(United States) Isaiah Martinez	4–1	June 8–9, 2018	2018 US World Team Trials	(United States) Lincoln, Nebraska
Win	161–6	(Italy) Frank Chamizo	6–5	May 17, 2018	2018 Beat The Streets: Team USA vs. The World All-Stars	(United States) New York City
2018 World Cup (gold) at 74kg
Win	160–6	(Azerbaijan) Gasjimurad Omarov	Fall	April 7–8, 2018	2018 World Cup	(United States) Iowa City, Iowa
Win	159–6	(Georgia (country)) Tarzan Maisuradze	TF 10–0	April 7–8, 2018	2018 World Cup	(United States) Iowa City, Iowa
Win	158–6	(Japan) Yuhi Fujinami	7–1	April 7–8, 2018	2018 World Cup	(United States) Iowa City, Iowa
2017 World Championships (gold) at 74kg
Win	157–6	(Russia) Khetag Tsabolov	9–6	August 21–27, 2017	2017 World Wrestling Championships	Paris, France
Win	156–6	(Uzbekistan) Bekzod Abdurakhmonov	6–5	August 21–27, 2017	2017 World Wrestling Championships	Paris, France
Win	155–6	(France) Zelimkhan Khadjiev	TF 13–2	August 21–27, 2017	2017 World Wrestling Championships	Paris, France
Win	154–6	(Japan) Sohsuke Takatani	TF 12–2	August 21–27, 2017	2017 World Wrestling Championships	Paris, France
Win	153–6	(Belarus) Ali Shabanau	7–5	August 21–27, 2017	2017 World Wrestling Championships	Paris, France
2017 Spain Grand Prix (gold) at 74kg
Win	152–6	(Canada) Jevon Balfour	TF 10–0	July 15–16, 2017	2017 Grand Prix of Spain	Madrid, Spain
Win	151–6	(Iran) Seyedali Mousavi	TF 10–0	July 15–16, 2017	2017 Grand Prix of Spain	Madrid, Spain
Win	150–6	(Kazakhstan) Nurgaliy Zholayev	TF 10–0	July 15–16, 2017	2017 Grand Prix of Spain	Madrid, Spain
Win	149–6	(Spain) Taimuraz Friev	TF 10–0	July 15–16, 2017	2017 Grand Prix of Spain	Madrid, Spain
2017 US World Team Trials (gold) at 74kg
Win	148–6	(United States) Kyle Dake	6–2	June 9–10, 2017	2017 US World Team Trials	(United States) Lincoln, Nebraska
Win	147–6	(United States) Kyle Dake	8–4	June 9–10, 2017	2017 US World Team Trials	(United States) Lincoln, Nebraska
Loss	146–6	(United States) Kyle Dake	6–6	June 9–10, 2017	2017 US World Team Trials	(United States) Lincoln, Nebraska
Win	146–5	(Japan) Sohsuke Takatani	9–2	May 17, 2017	2017 Beat The Streets: Times Square	(United States) New York City
2017 US Open (gold) at 74kg
Win	145–5	(United States) Kyle Dake	2–2	April 26–29, 2017	2017 US Open Championships	(United States) Las Vegas, Nevada
Win	144–5	(United States) Kevin Levalley	TF 12–2	April 26–29, 2017	2017 US Open Championships	(United States) Las Vegas, Nevada
Win	143–5	(United States) Dan Vallimont	6–0	April 26–29, 2017	2017 US Open Championships	(United States) Las Vegas, Nevada
Win	142–5	(United States) Michael Moreno	4–0	April 26–29, 2017	2017 US Open Championships	(United States) Las Vegas, Nevada
Win	141–5	(United States) Jeremy Anderson	TF 10–0	April 26–29, 2017	2017 US Open Championships	(United States) Las Vegas, Nevada
2017 World Cup (gold) at 74kg
Win	140–5	(Iran) Peyman Yarahmadi	3–2	February 16–17, 2017	2017 World Cup	Kermanshah, Iran
Win	139–5	(Azerbaijan) Murad Suleymanov	DQ	February 16–17, 2017	2017 World Cup	Kermanshah, Iran
Win	138–5	(Russia) Atsamaz Sanakoev	10–1	February 16–17, 2017	2017 World Cup	Kermanshah, Iran
Win	137–5	(Georgia (country)) Jumber Kvelashvili	2–2	February 16–17, 2017	2017 World Cup	Kermanshah, Iran
2016 Summer Olympics 9th at 74 kg
Loss	136–5	(Uzbekistan) Bekzod Abdurakhmonov	TF 1–11	August 19, 2016	2016 Summer Olympics	Rio de Janeiro, Brazil
Loss	136–4	(Russia) Aniuar Geduev	2–3	August 19, 2016	2016 Summer Olympics	Rio de Janeiro, Brazil
Win	136–3	(Guinea-Bissau) Augusto Midana	8–3	August 19, 2016	2016 Summer Olympics	Rio de Janeiro, Brazil
2016 Germany Grand Prix (gold) at 74kg
Win	135–3	(Germany) Martin Obst	3–1	July 2, 2016	2016 Grand Prix of Germany	Dortmund, Germany
Win	134–3	(Uzbekistan) Bekzod Abdurakhmonov	9–3	July 2, 2016	2016 Grand Prix of Germany	Dortmund, Germany
Win	133–3	(Poland) Andrzej Sokalski	TF 10–0	July 2, 2016	2016 Grand Prix of Germany	Dortmund, Germany
Win	132–3	(Germany) Markus Knobel	TF 10–0	July 2, 2016	2016 Grand Prix of Germany	Dortmund, Germany
Win	131–3	(Iran) Peyman Yarahmadi	11–2	May 19, 2016	2016 Beat The Streets: United In The Square	(United States) New York City
2016 US Olympic Team Trials (gold) at 74kg
Win	130–3	(United States) Andrew Howe	TF 10–0	April 9–10, 2016	2016 US Olympic Team Trials	(United States) Iowa City, Iowa
Win	129–3	(United States) Andrew Howe	9–3	April 9–10, 2016	2016 US Olympic Team Trials	(United States) Iowa City, Iowa
2016 Pan American Championships (gold) at 74kg
Win	128–3	(Colombia) Carlos Izquierdo	TF 12–2	February 26–28, 2016	2016 Pan American Championships	(United States) Frisco, Texas
Win	127–3	(Canada) Ilya Abelev	TF 13–0	February 26–28, 2016	2016 Pan American Championships	(United States) Frisco, Texas
Win	126–3	(Puerto Rico) Francisco Soler	Fall	February 26–28, 2016	2016 Pan American Championships	(United States) Frisco, Texas
Win	125–3	(Guatemala) Pedro Martínez	11–5	February 26–28, 2016	2016 Pan American Championships	(United States) Frisco, Texas
2016 Yaşar Doğu (gold) at 74kg
Win	124–3	(France) Zelimkhan Khadjiev	TF 14–3	February 4–6, 2016	2016 Yaşar Doğu International	Istanbul, Turkey
Win	123–3	(Turkey) Soner Demirtaş	5–0	February 4–6, 2016	2016 Yaşar Doğu International	Istanbul, Turkey
Win	122–3	(Turkey) Abdullah Arslan	TF 10–0	February 4–6, 2016	2016 Yaşar Doğu International	Istanbul, Turkey
Win	121–3	(Puerto Rico) Pedro Soto	TF 10–0	February 4–6, 2016	2016 Yaşar Doğu International	Istanbul, Turkey
2015 World Championships (gold) at 74 kg
Win	120–3	(Mongolia) Pürevjavyn Önörbat	TF 10–0	September 12, 2015	2015 World Wrestling Championships	(United States) Las Vegas, Nevada
Win	119–3	(Russia) Aniuar Geduev	4–3	September 12, 2015	2015 World Wrestling Championships	(United States) Las Vegas, Nevada
Win	118–3	(Iran) Alireza Ghasemi	5–0	September 12, 2015	2015 World Wrestling Championships	(United States) Las Vegas, Nevada
Win	117–3	(Hungary) Mihály Nagy	TF 11–0	September 12, 2015	2015 World Wrestling Championships	(United States) Las Vegas, Nevada
Win	116–3	(Ukraine) Oleg Zakharevych	TF 10–0	September 12, 2015	2015 World Wrestling Championships	(United States) Las Vegas, Nevada
Win	115–3	(Poland) Krystian Brzozowski	5–2	September 12, 2015	2015 World Wrestling Championships	(United States) Las Vegas, Nevada
2015 Pan American Games (gold) at 74 kg
Win	114–3	(Ecuador) Yoan Blanco	TF 11–0	July 18, 2015	2015 Pan American Games	Toronto, Canada
Win	113–3	(Canada) Jevon Balfour	TF 11–0	July 18, 2015	2015 Pan American Games	Toronto, Canada
Win	112–3	(Cuba) Liván López	TF 13–3	July 18, 2015	2015 Pan American Games	Toronto, Canada
2015 US World Team Trials (gold) at 74kg
Win	111–3	(United States) Kyle Dake	TF 14–4	June 12–14, 2015	2015 US World Team Trials	(United States) Madison, Wisconsin
Win	110–3	(United States) Kyle Dake	6–3	June 12–14, 2015	2015 US World Team Trials	(United States) Madison, Wisconsin
Win	109–3	(Cuba) Luis Quintana	Fall	May 12, 2015	2015 Beat The Streets: Salsa in the Square	(United States) New York City
2015 World Cup (gold) at 74kg
Win	108–3	(Iran) Morteza Rezaei Ghaleh	TF 10–0	April 11–12, 2015	2015 World Cup	(United States) Los Angeles, California
Win	107–3	(Mongolia) Pürevjavyn Önörbat	6–0	April 11–12, 2015	2015 World Cup	(United States) Los Angeles, California
Win	106–3	(Russia) Iakubali Shikhdzhamalov	TF 10–0	April 11–12, 2015	2015 World Cup	(United States) Los Angeles, California
Win	105–3	(Cuba) Liván López	6–2	April 11–12, 2015	2015 World Cup	(United States) Los Angeles, California
2015 Alexander Medved International (gold) at 74kg
Win	104–3	(Georgia (country)) Jakob Makarashvili	TF 12–1	March 6–7, 2015	2015 Alexander Medved International	Minsk, Belarus
Win	103–3	(Belarus) Ali Shabanau	10–6	March 6–7, 2015	2015 Alexander Medved International	Minsk, Belarus
Win	102–3	(Uzbekistan) Rashid Kurbanov	6–5	March 6–7, 2015	2015 Alexander Medved International	Minsk, Belarus
Win	101–3	(Russia) Askhab Geriev	TF 10–0	March 6–7, 2015	2015 Alexander Medved International	Minsk, Belarus
Win	100–3	(Russia) Gadzhi Gadzhiev	5–0	March 6–7, 2015	2015 Alexander Medved International	Minsk, Belarus
Win	99–3	(Uzbekistan) Islomiddin Rakhimov	TF 10–0	March 6–7, 2015	2015 Alexander Medved International	Minsk, Belarus
2014 World Championships (bronze) at 74kg
Win	98–3	(Ukraine) Rustam Dudaiev	Fall	September 8–14, 2014	2014 World Wrestling Championships	Tashkent, Uzbekistan
Loss	97–3	(Russia) Denis Tsargush	2–9	September 8–14, 2014	2014 World Wrestling Championships	Tashkent, Uzbekistan
Win	97–2	(Uzbekistan) Rashid Kurbanov	5–0	September 8–14, 2014	2014 World Wrestling Championships	Tashkent, Uzbekistan
Win	96–2	(South Korea) Lee Yun-seok	TF 13–2	September 8–14, 2014	2014 World Wrestling Championships	Tashkent, Uzbekistan
Win	95–2	(Guinea-Bissau) Augusto Midana	4–3	September 8–14, 2014	2014 World Wrestling Championships	Tashkent, Uzbekistan
2014 Pan American Championship (gold) at 74kg
Win	94–2	(Cuba) Liván López	TF 13–2	July 15–17, 2014	2014 Pan American Championships	Mexico City, Mexico
Win	93–2	(Venezuela) Adonis Arroyo	TF 10–0	July 15–17, 2014	2014 Pan American Championships	Mexico City, Mexico
Win	92–2	(Peru) Jose Santos Ambrocio	TF 10–0	July 15–17, 2014	2014 Pan American Championships	Mexico City, Mexico
Win	91–2	(Bolivia) Elio Zenteno	TF 10–0	July 15–17, 2014	2014 Pan American Championships	Mexico City, Mexico
2014 US World Team Trials (gold) at 74kg
Win	90–2	(United States) David Taylor	6–5	May 31 – June 1, 2014	2014 US World Team Trials	(United States) Madison, Wisconsin
Win	89–2	(United States) David Taylor	6–2	May 31 – June 1, 2014	2014 US World Team Trials	(United States) Madison, Wisconsin
Win	88–2	(Russia) Atsamaz Sanakoev	Fall	May 7, 2014	2014 Beat The Streets: Team USA vs. The World	(United States) New York City
2014 US Open (gold) at 74kg
Win	87–2	(United States) David Taylor	7–6	April 15–19, 2014	2014 US Open Championships	(United States) Las Vegas, Nevada
Win	86–2	(United States) Quinton Godley	TF 10–0	April 15–19, 2014	2014 US Open Championships	(United States) Las Vegas, Nevada
Win	85–2	(United States) Taylor West	TF 12–2	April 15–19, 2014	2014 US Open Championships	(United States) Las Vegas, Nevada
Win	84–2	(United States) Chance Goodman	TF 10–0	April 15–19, 2014	2014 US Open Championships	(United States) Las Vegas, Nevada
Win	83–2	(United States) Matt Donohoe	TF 11–0	April 15–19, 2014	2014 US Open Championships	(United States) Las Vegas, Nevada
2014 World Cup (gold) at 74kg
Win	82–2	(Turkey) Murat Erturk	Fall	March 15–16, 2014	2014 World Cup	(United States) Los Angeles, California
Win	81–2	(Iran) Ezzatollah Akbari	7–1	March 15–16, 2014	2014 World Cup	(United States) Los Angeles, California
Win	80–2	(Ukraine) Chikhladze Giya	TF 15–4	March 15–16, 2014	2014 World Cup	(United States) Los Angeles, California
Win	79–2	(India) Parveen Rana	Fall	March 15–16, 2014	2014 World Cup	(United States) Los Angeles, California
Win	78–2	(Armenia) Varuzhan Kajoyan	TF 16–6	March 15–16, 2014	2014 World Cup	(United States) Los Angeles, California
2014 Yaşar Doğu (bronze) at 74kg
Win	77–2	(Turkey) Batuhan Demirçin	10–2	February 15–16, 2014	2014 Yaşar Doğu International	Istanbul, Turkey
Win	76–2	(Russia) Khabib Batyrov	TF 10–0	February 15–16, 2014	2014 Yaşar Doğu International	Istanbul, Turkey
Loss	75–2	(United States) Nick Marable	4–4	February 15–16, 2014	2014 Yaşar Doğu International	Istanbul, Turkey
Win	75–1	(Mongolia) Pürevjavyn Önörbat	TF 10–0	February 15–16, 2014	2014 Yaşar Doğu International	Istanbul, Turkey
Win	74–1	(Uzbekistan) Rashid Kurbanov	6–0	February 15–16, 2014	2014 Yaşar Doğu International	Istanbul, Turkey
2013 World Championships (gold) at 74kg
Win	71–1	(Iran) Ezzatollah Akbari	4–0	September 16–22, 2013	2013 World Wrestling Championships	Budapest, Hungary
Win	70–1	(Belarus) Ali Shabanau	DQ	September 16–22, 2013	2013 World Wrestling Championships	Budapest, Hungary
Win	69–1	(Azerbaijan) Jabrayil Hasanov	TF 7–0	September 16–22, 2013	2013 World Wrestling Championships	Budapest, Hungary
Win	68–1	(India) Narsingh Pancham Yadav	TF 7–0	September 16–22, 2013	2013 World Wrestling Championships	Budapest, Hungary
Win	67–1	(Tajikistan) Gamid Dzhalilov	TF 9–2	September 16–22, 2013	2013 World Wrestling Championships	Budapest, Hungary
2013 Stepan Sargsyan International (gold) at 74kg
Win	66–1	(Russia) Akamaz Sanakoev	7–6	August 3–4, 2013	2013 Stepan Sargsyan International	Vanadzor, Armenia
Win	65–1	(Russia) Stanislav Khachirov	TF 9–1	August 3–4, 2013	2013 Stepan Sargsyan International	Vanadzor, Armenia
Win	64–1	(Armenia) Gevorg Hambarcumyan	TF 10–3	August 3–4, 2013	2013 Stepan Sargsyan International	Vanadzor, Armenia
Win	63–1	(Georgia (country)) Giorgi Sanodze	TF 8–0	August 3–4, 2013	2013 Stepan Sargsyan International	Vanadzor, Armenia
2013 US World Team Trials (gold) at 74kg
Win	62–1	(United States) Kyle Dake	OT 8–6	June 21–23, 2013	2013 US World Team Trials	(United States) Stillwater, Oklahoma
Win	61–1	(United States) Kyle Dake	7–0	June 21–23, 2013	2013 US World Team Trials	(United States) Stillwater, Oklahoma
Win	60–1	(Russia) Saba Khubezhty	TF 14–3	May 19, 2013	2013 Beat The Streets: United 4 Wrestling	(United States) Los Angeles
Win	59–1	(Russia) Saba Khubezhty	1–1, 5–0, 7–3	May 15, 2013	2013 Rumble on the Rails	(United States) New York City
2013 US Open (gold) at 74kg
Win	58–1	(United States) David Taylor	3–1, 1–0	April 17–19, 2013	2013 US Open Championships	(United States) Las Vegas, Nevada
Win	57–1	(United States) Colton Sponseller	1–0, 4–0	April 17–19, 2013	2013 US Open Championships	(United States) Las Vegas, Nevada
Win	56–1	(United States) Nate Carr	2–0, 6–0	April 17–19, 2013	2013 US Open Championships	(United States) Las Vegas, Nevada
Win	55–1	(United States) Joe Latham	TF 6–0, 6–0	April 17–19, 2013	2013 US Open Championships	(United States) Las Vegas, Nevada
2013 Alexander Medved International (gold) at 74kg
Win	54–1	(Ukraine) Dmitry Rochnyak		March 1–2, 2013	2013 Alexander Medved International	Minsk, Belarus
Win	53–1	(Russia) Magomed Zubairov		March 1–2, 2013	2013 Alexander Medved International	Minsk, Belarus
Win	52–1	(Ukraine) Andri Nagornyi		March 1–2, 2013	2013 Alexander Medved International	Minsk, Belarus
Win	51–1	(Kazakhstan) Ablaikhan Mursultanov		March 1–2, 2013	2013 Alexander Medved International	Minsk, Belarus
Win	50–1	(United States) Colt Sponseller		March 1–2, 2013	2013 Alexander Medved International	Minsk, Belarus
2013 World Cup (gold) at 74kg
Win	49–1	(Belarus) Ali Shabanau	1–1, 5–0	February 21–22, 2013	2013 World Cup	Tehran, Iran
Win	48–1	(Bulgaria) Miroslav Kirov	TF 7–0, 6–0	February 21–22, 2013	2013 World Cup	Tehran, Iran
Win	47–1	(Iran) Ezzatollah Akbari	4–0, 2–0	February 21–22, 2013	2013 World Cup	Tehran, Iran
Win	46–1	(Japan) Sohsuke Takatani	2–0, 7–1	February 21–22, 2013	2013 World Cup	Tehran, Iran
Win	45–1	(Georgia (country)) Jakob Makarashvili	2–0, 1–0	February 21–22, 2013	2013 World Cup	Tehran, Iran
2012 Summer Olympics (gold) at 74kg
Win	44–1	(Iran) Sadegh Goudarzi	1–0, 1–0	August 5–12, 2012	2012 Summer Olympics	London, United Kingdom
Win	43–1	(Russia) Denis Tsargush	3–1, 0–2, 2–1	August 5–12, 2012	2012 Summer Olympics	London, United Kingdom
Win	42–1	(Canada) Matt Gentry	2–1, 1–1	August 5–12, 2012	2012 Summer Olympics	London, United Kingdom
Win	41–1	(Puerto Rico) Francisco Soler	4–0, 6–0	August 5–12, 2012	2012 Summer Olympics	London, United Kingdom
Win	40–1	(Russia) Kamel Malikov	8–0, 5–0	June 7, 2012	2012 Beat The Streets: Grapple in the Apple	(United States) New York City
2012 World Cup (gold) at 74kg
Win	39–1	(Georgia (country)) Davit Khutsishvili		May 12–13, 2012	2012 World Cup	Baku, Azerbaijan
Win	38–1	(Iran) Sadegh Goudarzi		May 12–13, 2012	2012 World Cup	Baku, Azerbaijan
Win	37–1	(Turkey) Batuhan Demirçin		May 12–13, 2012	2012 World Cup	Baku, Azerbaijan
Win	36–1	(Japan) Sohsuke Takatani	4–5, 3–1, 3–2	May 12–13, 2012	2012 World Cup	Baku, Azerbaijan
Win	35–1	(Russia) Akhmed Gadzhimagomedov		May 12–13, 2012	2012 World Cup	Baku, Azerbaijan
2012 US Olympic Team Trials (gold) at 74kg
Win	34–1	(United States) Andrew Howe	4–2, 1–2, 1–0	April 21, 2012	2012 US Olympic Team Trials	(United States) Iowa City, Iowa
2012 Cerro Pelado International (gold) at 74kg
Win	33–1	(United States) Trent Paulson	2–1, 5–1	February 14–15, 2012	2012 Cerro Pelado International	Havana, Cuba
Win	32–1	(United States) Nick Marable	1–0, 1–1	February 14–15, 2012	2012 Cerro Pelado International	Havana, Cuba
Win	31–1	(Argentina) Ivan Llano	7–0, 6–0	February 14–15, 2012	2012 Cerro Pelado International	Havana, Cuba
2012 Dave Schultz M. International (gold) at 74kg
Win	30–1	(United States) Trent Paulson	1–0, 6–0	February 1–4, 2012	2012 Dave Schultz Memorial International	(United States) Colorado Springs, Colorado
Win	29–1	(United States) Tyler Caldwell	1–0, 1–0	February 1–4, 2012	2012 Dave Schultz Memorial International	(United States) Colorado Springs, Colorado
Win	28–1	(Uzbekistan) Muzaffar Abdurakhmanov	1–0, 5–0	February 1–4, 2012	2012 Dave Schultz Memorial International	(United States) Colorado Springs, Colorado
Win	27–1	(Italy) Carmelo Lumia	Fall	February 1–4, 2012	2012 Dave Schultz Memorial International	(United States) Colorado Springs, Colorado
Win	26–1	(Japan) Kohei Kitamura	1–0, 3–0	February 1–4, 2012	2012 Dave Schultz Memorial International	(United States) Colorado Springs, Colorado
2011 Pan American Games (gold) at 74kg
Win	25–1	(Cuba) Yunierki Blanco	3–2, 3–2	October 20–24, 2011	2011 Pan American Games	Guadalajara, Mexico
Win	24–1	(Venezuela) Ricardo Roberty	2–1, 1–1	October 20–24, 2011	2011 Pan American Games	Guadalajara, Mexico
Win	23–1	(Ecuador) Jose Mercado	7–0, 6–0	October 20–24, 2011	2011 Pan American Games	Guadalajara, Mexico
2011 World Championships (gold) at 74kg
Win	22–1	(Iran) Sadegh Goudarzi	3–2, 4–1	September 12–18, 2011	2011 World Wrestling Championships	Istanbul, Turkey
Win	21–1	(Azerbaijan) Ashraf Aliyev	0–2, 5–4, 3–0	September 12–18, 2011	2011 World Wrestling Championships	Istanbul, Turkey
Win	20–1	(Venezuela) Ricardo Roberty	2–1, 1–0	September 12–18, 2011	2011 World Wrestling Championships	Istanbul, Turkey
Win	19–1	(Russia) Denis Tsargush	1–3, 1–0, 2–1	September 12–18, 2011	2011 World Wrestling Championships	Istanbul, Turkey
Win	18–1	(Ukraine) Dmytro Rochniak	3–1, 4–2	September 12–18, 2011	2011 World Wrestling Championships	Istanbul, Turkey
2011 Ukrainian Memorial International (gold) at 74kg
Win	17–1	(Russia) Alibek Agbayev	3–1, 6–0	July 23–24, 2011	2011 Ukrainian Memorial International	Kyiv, Ukraine
Win	16–1	(Armenia) Musa Murtazaliev	1–0, 4–1	July 23–24, 2011	2011 Ukrainian Memorial International	Kyiv, Ukraine
Win	15–1	(Ukraine) Giya Chikhladze	2–1, 5–0	July 23–24, 2011	2011 Ukrainian Memorial International	Kyiv, Ukraine
Win	14–1	(Russia) Zelim Perisayev	3–1, 4–0	July 23–24, 2011	2011 Ukrainian Memorial International	Kyiv, Ukraine
Win	13–1	(Kyrgyzstan) Ilgiz Jakupbekov		July 23–24, 2011	2011 Ukrainian Memorial International	Kyiv, Ukraine
2011 US World Team Trials (gold) at 74kg
Win	12–1	(United States) Andrew Howe	3–1, 1–0	June 9–11, 2011	2011 US World Team Trials	(United States) Oklahoma City, Oklahoma
Win	11–1	(United States) Andrew Howe	1–0, 1–2, 3–2	June 9–11, 2011	2011 US World Team Trials	(United States) Oklahoma City, Oklahoma
Win	10–1	(Russia) Aniuar Geduev	1–0, 2–1	May 5, 2011	2011 Beat The Streets: USA vs. Russia	(United States) New York City
2011 US Open (gold) at 74kg
Win	9–1	(United States) Nick Marable	0–3, 1–0, 3–0	April 7–10, 2011	2011 US Open Championships	(United States) Cleveland, Ohio
Win	8–1	(United States) Kirk White	4–2, 3–2	April 7–10, 2011	2011 US Open Championships	(United States) Cleveland, Ohio
Win	7–1	(United States) Lloyd Rogers	3–0, 8–0	April 7–10, 2011	2011 US Open Championships	(United States) Cleveland, Ohio
Win	6–1	(United States) Bobby Nash	Fall	April 7–10, 2011	2011 US Open Championships	(United States) Cleveland, Ohio
2007 US University Nationals (silver) at 66kg
Loss	5–1	(United States) Teyon Ware	1–1, 0–1	April 22, 2007	2007 US University National Championships	(United States) Akron, Ohio
Win	5–0	(United States) Ryan Needle	4–2, 3–2	April 22, 2007	2007 US University National Championships	(United States) Akron, Ohio
Win	4–0	(United States) Nathaniel Holt	TF 8–2, 6–0	April 22, 2007	2007 US University National Championships	(United States) Akron, Ohio
Win	3–0	(United States) Ryan Williams	4–3, 7–0	April 22, 2007	2007 US University National Championships	(United States) Akron, Ohio
Win	2–0	(United States) David Christian	9–1, 6–1	April 22, 2007	2007 US University National Championships	(United States) Akron, Ohio
Win	1–0	(United States) Gabriel Mooney	3–0, 3–0	April 22, 2007	2007 US University National Championships	(United States) Akron, Ohio

== NCAA record ==
NCAA Championships Matches
Res.	Record	Opponent	Score	Date	Event
2011 NCAA Championships (gold) at 165 lbs
Win	15–3	Tyler Caldwell	MD 11–3	March 17–19, 2011	2011 NCAA Division I Wrestling Championships
Win	14–3	Colt Sponseller	MD 14–6	March 17–19, 2011	2011 NCAA Division I Wrestling Championships
Win	13–3	Scott Winston	TF 23–8	March 17–19, 2011	2011 NCAA Division I Wrestling Championships
Win	12–3	Ethan Headlee	TF 23–7	March 17–19, 2011	2011 NCAA Division I Wrestling Championships
2009 NCAA Championships (gold) at 157 lbs
Win	11–3	Mike Poeta	5–1	March 19–21, 2009	2009 NCAA Division I Wrestling Championships
Win	10–3	Gregor Gillespie	MD 12–4	March 19–21, 2009	2009 NCAA Division I Wrestling Championships
Win	9–3	Cyler Sanderson	MD 14–6	March 19–21, 2009	2009 NCAA Division I Wrestling Championships
Win	8–3	Colton Salazar	Fall	March 19–21, 2009	2009 NCAA Division I Wrestling Championships
Win	7–3	Hadley Harrison	TF 23–7	March 19–21, 2009	2009 NCAA Division I Wrestling Championships
2008 NCAA Championships (bronze) at 149 lbs
Win	6–3	Josh Churella	4–2	March 20–22, 2008	2008 NCAA Division I Wrestling Championships
Win	5–3	J.P. O'Connor	5–3	March 20–22, 2008	2008 NCAA Division I Wrestling Championships
Loss	4–3	Brent Metcalf	4–8	March 20–22, 2008	2008 NCAA Division I Wrestling Championships
Win	4–2	Josh Churella	3–2	March 20–22, 2008	2008 NCAA Division I Wrestling Championships
Win	3–2	Ed McCray	TF 21–5	March 20–22, 2008	2008 NCAA Division I Wrestling Championships
Win	2–2	César Grajales	4–1	March 20–22, 2008	2008 NCAA Division I Wrestling Championships
2007 NCAA Championships at 149 lbs
Loss	1–2	Matt Storniolo	SV-4 1–6	March 15–17, 2007	2007 NCAA Division I Wrestling Championships
Win	1–1	Matt Dunn	8–2	March 15–17, 2007	2007 NCAA Division I Wrestling Championships
Loss	0–1	Dustin Schlatter	2–3	March 15–17, 2007	2007 NCAA Division I Wrestling Championships

== See also ==
- List of World and Olympic Champions in men's freestyle wrestling
- United States results in men's freestyle wrestling
