= 2017 World Wrestling Championships – Men's freestyle 74 kg =

Men's freestyle 74 kg at the 2017 World Championships
- Venue: AccorHotels Arena
- Dates: 26 August 2017
- Competitors: 31 from 31 nations

Medalists
gold medal	Jordan Burroughs	United States
silver medal	Khetag Tsabolov	Russia
bronze medal	Soner Demirtaş	Turkey
bronze medal	Ali Shabanau	Belarus

The men's freestyle 74 kilograms is a competition featured at the 2017 World Wrestling Championships, and was held in Paris, France on 26 August 2017.

This freestyle wrestling competition consisted of a single-elimination tournament, with a repechage used to determine the winners of two bronze medals.

== Results ==
Legend

- D — Disqualified
- F — Won by fall
- WO — Won by walkover

=== Final ===
Final
Khetag Tsabolov (RUS)	6
Jordan Burroughs (USA)	9

=== Top half ===
Round of 32
Svetoslav Dimitrov (BUL)	4
Evgheni Nedealco (MDA)	11
Taimuraz Friev (ESP)	9
Gamid Dzhalilov (TJK)	2
Andrzej Sokalski (POL)	9
Dorjvaanchigiin Gombodorj (MGL)	11
Amirkhan Visalimov (AUT)	8
Hanoch Rachamin (ISR)	14
Khetag Tsabolov (RUS)	11
Connor Evans (AUS)	0
Galymzhan Usserbayev (KAZ)	7
Jabrayil Hasanov (AZE)	9
Parveen Rana (IND)	4
Saiakbai Usupov (KGZ)	2

Round of 16
Soner Demirtaş (TUR)	12
Evgheni Nedealco (MDA)	2
Taimuraz Friev (ESP)	4
Dorjvaanchigiin Gombodorj (MGL)	2
Hanoch Rachamin (ISR)	0
Khetag Tsabolov (RUS)	10
Jabrayil Hasanov (AZE)	5
Parveen Rana (IND)	0

Quarterfinals
Soner Demirtaş (TUR)	10
Taimuraz Friev (ESP)	0
Khetag Tsabolov (RUS)	11^{F}
Jabrayil Hasanov (AZE)	4

Semifinals
Soner Demirtaş (TUR)	0
Khetag Tsabolov (RUS)	10

=== Bottom half ===
Round of 32
Zelimkhan Khadjiev (FRA)	8
Peyman Yarahmadi (IRI)	4
Vasyl Mykhailov (UKR)	10
Ailixiati Yiriken (CHN)	0
Ali Shabanau (BLR)	5
Jordan Burroughs (USA)	7
Sosuke Takatani (JPN)	14^{F}
Grigor Grigoryan (ARM)	10^{D}
Liván López (CUB)	12
Kyrillos Binenmpaoum (GRE)	1
Akash Khullar (NZL)	0
Lee Yun-seok (KOR)	11
Jevon Balfour (CAN)	3
Kubilay Cakici (GER)	4
Jumber Kvelashvili (GEO)	0
Bekzod Abdurakhmonov (UZB)	10

Round of 16
Zelimkhan Khadjiev (FRA)	9
Vasyl Mykhailov (UKR)	8
Jordan Burroughs (USA)	12
Sosuke Takatani (JPN)	2
Liván López (CUB)	10
Lee Yun-seok (KOR)	0
Kubilay Cakici (GER)	0
Bekzod Abdurakhmonov (UZB)	11

Quarterfinals
Zelimkhan Khadjiev (FRA)	2
Jordan Burroughs (USA)	13
Liván López (CUB)	0
Bekzod Abdurakhmonov (UZB)	10

Semifinals
Jordan Burroughs (USA)	6
Bekzod Abdurakhmonov (UZB)	5

=== Repechage ===
Repechage round 1
Connor Evans (AUS)	11
Hanoch Rachamin (ISR)	11
Ali Shabanau (BLR)	6
Sosuke Takatani (JPN)	1

Repechage round 2
Hanoch Rachamin (ISR)
Jabrayil Hasanov (AZE)	WO
Ali Shabanau (BLR)	10
Zelimkhan Khadjiev (FRA)	0

Bronze medals
Jabrayil Hasanov (AZE)	0
Soner Demirtaş (TUR)	5
Ali Shabanau (BLR)	8
Bekzod Abdurakhmonov (UZB)	4
