= 2019 World Wrestling Championships – Men's freestyle 74 kg =

Men's freestyle 74 kg at the 2019 World Championships
- Venue: Barys Arena
- Dates: 20–21 September 2019
- Competitors: 39 from 39 nations

Medalists
gold medal	Zaurbek Sidakov	Russia
silver medal	Frank Chamizo	Italy
bronze medal	Daniyar Kaisanov	Kazakhstan
bronze medal	Jordan Burroughs	United States

The men's freestyle 74 kilograms is a competition featured at the 2019 World Wrestling Championships, and was held in Nur-Sultan, Kazakhstan on 20 and 21 September.

== Results ==
Legend

- F — Won by fall
- R — Retired

=== Finals ===
Semifinals		Final
Frank Chamizo (ITA)	4
Zelimkhan Khadjiev (FRA)	1	Frank Chamizo (ITA)	2
Zaurbek Sidakov (RUS)	4	Zaurbek Sidakov (RUS)	5
Jordan Burroughs (USA)	3

=== Top half ===
==== Section 1 ====
Round of 64

Round of 32
Frank Chamizo (ITA)	10
Marc Dietsche (SUI)	0
Lee Seung-chul (KOR)	6
Aimar Andruse (EST)	0
Anthony Montero (VEN)	2
Daniyar Kaisanov (KAZ)	8^{F}
Elias Vaoifi (ASA)	3
Kyrillos Binenmpaoum (GRE)	9

Round of 16
Frank Chamizo (ITA)	10
Lee Seung-chul (KOR)	2
Daniyar Kaisanov (KAZ)	10
Kyrillos Binenmpaoum (GRE)	0

Quarterfinals
Frank Chamizo (ITA)	5^{F}
Daniyar Kaisanov (KAZ)	0

==== Section 2 ====
Round of 64

Round of 32
Vasyl Mykhailov (UKR)	12
Luo Yin (CHN)	1
Andrius Mažeika (LTU)	2
Varuzhan Kajoyan (ARM)	10
Evgheni Nedealco (MDA)	10
Ogbonna John (NGR)	4
Zelimkhan Khadjiev (FRA)	8^{F}
Avtandil Kentchadze (GEO)	2

Round of 16
Vasyl Mykhailov (UKR)	10
Varuzhan Kajoyan (ARM)	4
Evgheni Nedealco (MDA)	2
Zelimkhan Khadjiev (FRA)	4^{F}

Quarterfinals
Vasyl Mykhailov (UKR)	0
Zelimkhan Khadjiev (FRA)	4

=== Bottom half ===
==== Section 3 ====
Round of 64

Round of 32
Zaurbek Sidakov (RUS)	10
Victor Hernández (MEX)	0
Samy Moustafa (EGY)	4
Kamil Rybicki (POL)	7^{F}
Ilgiz Dzhakypbekov (KGZ)	4
Zandanbudyn Sumiyaabazar (MGL)	2
Jasmit Phulka (CAN)	2
Mao Okui (JPN)	8

Round of 16
Zaurbek Sidakov (RUS)	8
Kamil Rybicki (POL)	0
Ilgiz Dzhakypbekov (KGZ)	2
Mao Okui (JPN)	2

Quarterfinals
Zaurbek Sidakov (RUS)	6
Mao Okui (JPN)	0

==== Section 4 ====
Round of 64
Geandry Garzón (CUB)	5
Reza Afzali (IRI)	2
Franklin Gómez (PUR)	0
Bekzod Abdurakhmonov (UZB)	4
Maxim Vasilioglo (ROU)	1
Soner Demirtaş (TUR)	13
Sushil Kumar (IND)	9
Khadzhimurad Gadzhiyev (AZE)	11
Murad Kuramagomedov (HUN)	14
Guy Delumeau (PLW)	2
Miroslav Kirov (BUL)	4
Néstor Tafur (COL)	8
Azamat Nurykau (BLR)	5
Johann Steinforth (GER)	2

Round of 32
Geandry Garzón (CUB)	6
Bekzod Abdurakhmonov (UZB)	10
Soner Demirtaş (TUR)	2
Khadzhimurad Gadzhiyev (AZE)	5
Murad Kuramagomedov (HUN)	3
Néstor Tafur (COL)	0
Azamat Nurykau (BLR)	10
Jordan Burroughs (USA)	11

Round of 16
Bekzod Abdurakhmonov (UZB)	9
Khadzhimurad Gadzhiyev (AZE)	12
Murad Kuramagomedov (HUN)	4
Jordan Burroughs (USA)	6

Quarterfinals
Khadzhimurad Gadzhiyev (AZE)	1
Jordan Burroughs (USA)	8

=== Repechage ===
Repechage round 2
Marc Dietsche (SUI)	0
Lee Seung-chul (KOR)	10
Victor Hernández (MEX)	0
Kamil Rybicki (POL)	11

Repechage round 3
Lee Seung-chul (KOR)	0^{R}
Daniyar Kaisanov (KAZ)	6
Kamil Rybicki (POL)	2
Mao Okui (JPN)	6

Bronze medals
Daniyar Kaisanov (KAZ)	3
Zelimkhan Khadjiev (FRA)	4
Mao Okui (JPN)	0
Jordan Burroughs (USA)	10

- Zelimkhan Khadjiev of France originally won the bronze medal, but was disqualified after he tested positive for doping. Daniyar Kaisanov was raised to third and took the bronze medal. Kamil Rybicki of Poland moved up to the 6th place and received the Olympic quota.
