= Wrestling at the 2016 Summer Olympics – Men's freestyle 74 kg =

Men's freestyle 74 kg at the Games of the XXXI Olympiad
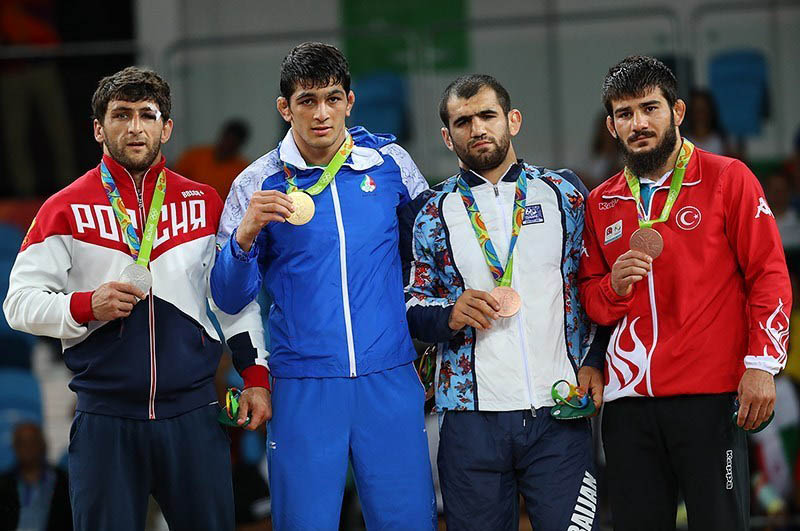
- Medalists
- Venue: Carioca Arena 2
- Date: 19 August 2016
- Competitors: 20 from 20 nations

Medalists
1st place, gold medalist(s)		Hassan Yazdani	Iran
2nd place, silver medalist(s)		Aniuar Geduev	Russia
3rd place, bronze medalist(s)		Jabrayil Hasanov	Azerbaijan
3rd place, bronze medalist(s)		Soner Demirtaş	Turkey

Men's freestyle 74 kilograms competition at the 2016 Summer Olympics in Rio de Janeiro, Brazil, took place on August 19 at the Carioca Arena 2 in Barra da Tijuca.

This freestyle wrestling competition consists of a single-elimination tournament, with a repechage used to determine the winner of two bronze medals. The two finalists face off for gold and silver medals. Each wrestler who loses to one of the two finalists moves into the repechage, culminating in a pair of bronze medal matches featuring the semifinal losers each facing the remaining repechage opponent from their half of the bracket.

Each bout consists of a single round within a six-minute limit. The wrestler who scores more points is the winner.

== Schedule ==
All times are Brasília Standard Time (UTC−03:00)

Date	Time	Event
19 August 2016	10:00	Qualification rounds
19 August 2016	16:00	Repechage
19 August 2016	17:00	Finals

== Results ==
Legend

- R — Retired
- WO — Won by walkover

=== Final ===
Final
Aniuar Geduev (RUS)	6
Hassan Yazdani (IRI)	6

=== Top half ===
Qualifications

1/8 finals
Jordan Burroughs (USA)	8
Augusto Midana (GBS)	3
Aniuar Geduev (RUS)	10
Bekzod Abdurakhmonov (UZB)	5
Jakob Makarashvili (GEO)	13
Georgi Ivanov (BUL)	8
Carlos Izquierdo (COL)	0
Jabrayil Hasanov (AZE)	10

1/4 finals
Jordan Burroughs (USA)	2
Aniuar Geduev (RUS)	3
Jakob Makarashvili (GEO)	0
Jabrayil Hasanov (AZE)	11

Semifinals
Aniuar Geduev (RUS)	5
Jabrayil Hasanov (AZE)	4

=== Bottom half ===
Qualifications
Zelimkhan Khadjiev (FRA)	WO
Narsingh Yadav (IND)
Sosuke Takatani (JPN)	6
Talgat Ilyasov (AUS)	0^{R}
Liván López (CUB)	8
Taimuraz Friev (ESP)	6
Galymzhan Usserbayev (KAZ)	13
Evgheni Nedealco (MDA)	2

1/8 finals
Pürevjavyn Önörbat (MGL)	2
Soner Demirtaş (TUR)	4
Hassan Yazdani (IRI)	10
Asnage Castelly (HAI)	0
Zelimkhan Khadjiev (FRA)	4
Sosuke Takatani (JPN)	5
Liván López (CUB)	7
Galymzhan Usserbayev (KAZ)	8

1/4 finals
Soner Demirtaş (TUR)	0
Hassan Yazdani (IRI)	7
Sosuke Takatani (JPN)	3
Galymzhan Usserbayev (KAZ)	4

Semifinals
Hassan Yazdani (IRI)	10
Galymzhan Usserbayev (KAZ)	0

=== Repechage ===
Repechage round 2
Bekzod Abdurakhmonov (UZB)	11
Jordan Burroughs (USA)	1
Asnage Castelly (HAI)	0
Soner Demirtaş (TUR)	12

Bronze medals
Bekzod Abdurakhmonov (UZB)	7
Jabrayil Hasanov (AZE)	9
Soner Demirtaş (TUR)	6
Galymzhan Usserbayev (KAZ)	0

== Final standing ==
Rank	Athlete
1st place, gold medalist(s)	Hassan Yazdani (IRI)
2nd place, silver medalist(s)	Aniuar Geduev (RUS)
3rd place, bronze medalist(s)	Jabrayil Hasanov (AZE)
3rd place, bronze medalist(s)	Soner Demirtaş (TUR)
5	Bekzod Abdurakhmonov (UZB)
5	Galymzhan Usserbayev (KAZ)
7	Sosuke Takatani (JPN)
8	Zelimkhan Khadjiev (FRA)
9	Jordan Burroughs (USA)
10	Liván López (CUB)
11	Jakob Makarashvili (GEO)
12	Georgi Ivanov (BUL)
13	Taimuraz Friev (ESP)
14	Augusto Midana (GBS)
15	Pürevjavyn Önörbat (MGL)
16	Evgheni Nedealco (MDA)
17	Talgat Ilyasov (AUS)
18	Carlos Izquierdo (COL)
19	Asnage Castelly (HAI)
DQ	Narsingh Yadav (IND)

- Narsingh Yadav failed both A and B sample doping tests on 25 June and 5 July, but was reinstated on 3 August when the National Anti-Doping Agency of India gave him a clean record on grounds that he had been a victim of sabotage. However, the World Anti-Doping Agency appealed against this decision to drop the doping charges: Yadav was suspended for four years and ejected from the competition by the Court of Arbitration on 18 August.
