= Wrestling at the 2011 Pan American Games – Men's freestyle 74 kg =

Men's Freestyle 74 kg at the 2011 Pan American Games
- Venue: CODE II Gymnasium
- Dates: October 24
- Competitors: 8 from 8 nations

Medalists
Gold medal	Jordan Burroughs	United States
Silver medal	Yunierki Blanco	Cuba
Bronze medal	Matt Gentry	Canada
Bronze medal	Ricardo Roberty	Venezuela

The Men's freestyle 74 kg competition of the wrestling events at the 2011 Pan American Games in Guadalajara, Mexico, was held on October 24 at the CODE II Gymanasium. The defending champion was Ivan Fundora from Cuba.

This freestyle wrestling competition consisted of a single-elimination tournament, with a repechage used to determine the winner of two bronze medals. The two finalists faced off for gold and silver medals. Each wrestler who lost to one of the two finalists moved into the repechage, culminating in a pair of bronze medal matches featuring the semifinal losers each facing the remaining repechage opponent from their half of the bracket.

Each bout consisted of up to three rounds, lasting two minutes apiece. The wrestler who scored more points in each round was the winner of that rounds; the bout finished when one wrestler had won two rounds (and thus the match).

== Schedule ==
All times are Central Standard Time (UTC-6).

Date	Time	Round
October 24, 2011	10:00	Quarterfinals
October 24, 2011	10:48	Semifinals
October 24, 2011	18:00	Bronze medal matches
October 24, 2011	18:08	Final

== Results ==
=== Finals round ===
Quarterfinals
Yunierki Blanco (CUB)	6	3
Eduardo Valencia (MEX)	1	0
Matt Gentry (CAN)	1	1
Pool Ambrocio (PER)	0	0
Jose Mercado (ECU)	0	0
Jordan Burroughs (USA)	7	6
Rosalio Medrano (COL)	1	0
Ricardo Roberty (VEN)	0	6

Semifinals
Yunierki Blanco (CUB)	1	2	1
Matt Gentry (CAN)	1	1	0
Jordan Burroughs (USA)	2	1
Ricardo Roberty (VEN)	1	1

Finals
Yunierki Blanco (CUB)	2	2
Jordan Burroughs (USA)	3	3

=== Repechage round ===
Two bronze medals were awarded.

Repechage round 1	Bronze Medal Bout
	Matt Gentry (CAN)	4 9
Eduardo Valencia (MEX)	Eduardo Valencia (MEX)	0 2
Bye

Repechage round 1	Bronze Medal Bout
	Ricardo Roberty (VEN)	3 7
Jose Mercado (ECU)	Jose Mercado (ECU)	0 0
Bye
