= Wrestling at the 2015 Pan American Games – Men's freestyle 74 kg =

Men's Freestyle 74 kg at the 2015 Pan American Games
- Venue: Mississauga Sports Centre
- Dates: July 18
- Competitors: 9 from 9 nations

Medalists
Gold medal	Jordan Burroughs	United States
Silver medal	Yoan Blanco	Ecuador
Bronze medal	Christian Sarco	Venezuela
Bronze medal	Liván López	Cuba

The men's freestyle 74 kg competition of the Wrestling events at the 2015 Pan American Games in Toronto were held on July 18 at the Mississauga Sports Centre.

== Schedule ==
All times are Eastern Daylight Time (UTC-4).

Date	Time	Round
July 18, 2015	14:35	1/8 finals
July 18, 2015	14:35	Quarterfinals
July 18, 2015	15:20	Semifinals
July 18, 2015	20:00	Bronze medal matches
July 18, 2015	20:18	Final

== Results ==
Legend

- F — Won by fall

=== Final ===
Qualifications
Jevon Balfour (CAN)	10
Yohar Munoz (PAN)	0

Quarterfinals
Yoan Blanco (ECU)	10
Johnathan Scott (CRC)	0
Christian Sarco (VEN)	10
Eduardo Gajardo (CHI)	0
Liván López (CUB)	3
Jordan Burroughs (USA)	14
Pedro De Oliveira (BRA)	0
Jevon Balfour (CAN)	10

Semifinals
Yoan Blanco (ECU)	2
Christian Sarco (VEN)	2
Jordan Burroughs (USA)	11
Jevon Balfour (CAN)	0

Finals
Yoan Blanco (ECU)	0
Jordan Burroughs (USA)	11

=== Repechage ===
Repechage round 2
Bye
Johnathan Scott (CRC)
Bye
Liván López (CUB)

Bronze medal match
Johnathan Scott (CRC)	0
Christian Sarco (VEN)	10^{F}
Liván López (CUB)	10
Jevon Balfour (CAN)	0
