= 2018 Wrestling World Cup – Men's freestyle =

Men's freestyle at the 2018 Wrestling World Cup
- Venue: Carver–Hawkeye Arena
- Location: Iowa City, United States
- Dates: 7–8 April

Medalists
gold medal	United States
silver medal	Azerbaijan
bronze medal	Japan

The 2018 Wrestling World Cup - Men's freestyle was the last of a set of three Wrestling World Cups in 2018 which took place in Iowa City, United States on April 7–8, 2018. This event took place at Carver–Hawkeye Arena at the University of Iowa.

On day 1, the attendance was 6,388.

== Background ==
Initially the top teams from Russia, Turkey and Iran were to compete in the 2018 World Cup; however they were unable to attend because Turkey had financial difficulties, Russia had visa issues and Iran refused to compete due to a disagreement with the UWW event calendar. Mongolia and India replaced these teams.

== Pool stage ==
Team competes for 1st place
Team competes for 3rd place
Team competes for 5th place
Team competes for 7th place

=== Pool A ===
Team	Pld	W	L
United States	3	3	0
Japan	3	2	1
Georgia	3	1	2
India	3	0	3

POOL A
Round I

United States 10 - 0 India
Weight	United States	result	India
57 kg	Thomas Gilman	–	by forfeit
61 kg	Joe Colon	6 – 4	Sandeep Tomar
65 kg	Logan Stieber	12 – 2	Sharvan Sharvan
70 kg	James Green	10 – 0	Arun Kumar
74 kg	Jordan Burroughs	11 – 1	Vinod Kumar Omprakash
79 kg	Kyle Dake	11 – 0	Sachin Giri
86 kg	David Taylor	10 – 0	Pawan Kumar
92 kg	Hayden Zillmer	7 – 0	Deepak Punia
97 kg	Kyle Snyder	10 – 0	Viky Viky
125 kg	Don Bradley	10 – 0	Singh Pushpender

Georgia 3 - 7 Japan
Weight	Georgia	result	Japan
57 kg	Teimuraz Vanishvili	0 – 11	Yuki Takahashi
61 kg	Lasha Lomtadze	2 – 9	Rinya Nakamura
65 kg	Magomed Saidovi	4 – 7	Daichi Takatani
70 kg	Levan Kelekhsashvili	8 – 10	Keisuke Otoguro
74 kg	Tarzan Maisuradze	2 – 11	Yuhi Fujinami
79 kg	Tariel Gaphrindashvili	0 – 11	Sohsuke Takatani
86 kg	David Khutsishvili	0 – 6	Shota Shirai
92 kg	Dato Marsagishvili	10 – 0	Takashi Ishiguro
97 kg	Givi Matcharashvili	10 – 0	Takeshi Yamaguchi
125 kg	Zviadi Metreveli	3 – 2	Taiki Yamamoto

Round II

United States 7 - 3 Japan
Weight	United States	result	Japan
57 kg	Thomas Gilman	1 – 4	Yuki Takahashi
61 kg	Kendric Maple	2 – 2	Kazuya Koyanagi
65 kg	Logan Stieber	5 – 10	Takuto Otoguro
70 kg	James Green	8 – 5	Kirin Kinoshita
74 kg	Jordan Burroughs	7 – 1	Yuhi Fujinami
79 kg	Kyle Dake	10 – 0	Sohsuke Takatani
86 kg	David Taylor	12 – 2	Masao Matsusaka
92 kg	J'den Cox	11 – 0	Takashi Ishiguro
97 kg	Kyle Snyder	10 – 0	Taira Sonoda
125 kg	Nick Gwiazdowski	10 – 0	Nobuyoshi Arakida

Georgia 8 - 2 India
Weight	Georgia	result	India
57 kg	Teimuraz Vanishvili	–	by forfeit
61 kg	Lasha Lomtadze	1 – 4	Sandeep Tomar
65 kg	Magomed Saidovi	3 – 9	Sharvan Sharvan
70 kg	Levan Kelekhsashvili	7 – 2	Arun Kumar
74 kg	Tarzan Maisuradze	10 – 0	Vinod Kumar Omprakash
79 kg	Tariel Gaphrindashvili	11 – 1	Sachin Giri
86 kg	David Khutsishvili	4 – 3	Pawan Kumar
92 kg	Dato Marsagishvili	10 – 0	Deepak Punia
97 kg	Givi Matcharashvili	10 – 0	Viky Viky
125 kg	Zviadi Metreveli	5 – 0	Singh Pushpender

Round III

United States 8 - 2 Georgia
Weight	United States	result	Georgia
57 kg	Thomas Gilman	6 – 4	Teimuraz Vanishvili
61 kg	Kendric Maple	3 – 4	Lasha Lomtadze
65 kg	Logan Stieber	10 – 0	Magomed Saidovi
70 kg	James Green	8 – 0	Levan Kelekhsashvili
74 kg	Jordan Burroughs	10 – 0	Tarzan Maisuradze
79 kg	Kyle Dake	10 – 0	Tariel Gaphrindashvili
86 kg	David Taylor	11 – 1	David Khutsishvili
92 kg	J'den Cox	0 – 5	Dato Marsagishvili
97 kg	Kyle Snyder	10 – 0	Givi Matcharashvili
125 kg	Nick Gwiazdowski	7 – 0	Zviadi Metreveli

Japan 9 - 1 India
Weight	Japan	result	India
57 kg	Yuki Takahashi	–	by forfeit
61 kg	Rinya Nakamura	11 – 0	Sandeep Tomar
65 kg	Takuto Otoguro	10 – 0	Sharvan Sharvan
70 kg	Kirin Kinoshita	10 – 0	Arun Kumar
74 kg	Ken Hosaka	–	Vinod Kumar Omprakash
79 kg	Sohsuke Takatani	10 – 0	Sachin Giri
86 kg	Masao Matsusaka	10 – 0	Pawan Kumar
92 kg	Takashi Ishiguro	1 – 2	Deepak Punia
97 kg	Takeshi Yamaguchi	6 – 2	Viky Viky
125 kg	Nobuyoshi Arakida	4 – 0	Singh Pushpender

=== Pool B ===
Team	Pld	W	L
Azerbaijan	3	3	0
Cuba	3	1	2
Mongolia	3	1	2
Kazakhstan	3	1	2

POOL B
Round I

Mongolia 6 - 4 Kazakhstan
Weight	Mongolia	result	Kazakhstan
57 kg	Erdenebatyn Bekhbayar	10 – 0	Mukhambet Kuatbek
61 kg	Tümenbilegiin Tüvshintulga	2 – 1	Rassul Kaliyev
65 kg	Batchuluuny Batmagnai	1 – 13	Sayatbek Okassov
70 kg	Sanjaa Ganbayar	1 – 4	Meirzhan Ashirov
74 kg	Ganzorigiin Mandakhnaran	9 – 0	Daniyar Kaisanov
79 kg	Gantulgyn Iderkhüü	1 – 11	Saken Aitzhanov
86 kg	Orgodolyn Üitümen	6 – 4	Elkhan Assadov
92 kg	Turtogtokh Luvsandorj	1 – 2	Iliskhan Chilaev
97 kg	Batsul Ulzisaikhan	7 – 5	Mamed Ibragimov
125 kg	Natsagsürengiin Zolboo	12 – 2	Oleg Boltin

Azerbaijan 8 - 2 Cuba
Weight	Azerbaijan	result	Cuba
57 kg	Giorgi Edisherashvili	7 – 5	Reineri Andreu
61 kg	Akhmednabi Gvarzatilov	8 – 0	Yowlys Bonne
65 kg	Haji Aliyev	2 – 8^{F}	Alejandro Valdés
70 kg	Joshgun Azimov	7 – 3	Franklin Marén
74 kg	Gadzhimurad Omarov	2 – 6	Liván López
79 kg	Jabrayil Hasanov	10 – 0	Yoan Zulueta
86 kg	Aleksandr Gostiyev	3 – 2	Yurieski Torreblanca
92 kg	Aslanbek Alborov	7 – 4	Lázaro Hernández
97 kg	Roman Bakirov	3 – 0	Reineris Salas
125 kg	Jamaladdin Magomedov	3 – 2	Yudenny Alpajón

Round II

Mongolia 3 - 7 Cuba
Weight	Mongolia	result	Cuba
57 kg	Erdenebatyn Bekhbayar	4 – 0	Reineri Andreu
61 kg	Tümenbilegiin Tüvshintulga	4 – 6	Yowlys Bonne
65 kg	Batchuluuny Batmagnai	0 – 11	Alejandro Valdés
70 kg	Sanjaa Ganbayar	3 – 5	Franklin Marén
74 kg	Ganzorigiin Mandakhnaran	3 – 3	Liván López
79 kg	Gantulgyn Iderkhüü	10^{F} – 6	Yoan Zulueta
86 kg	Orgodolyn Üitümen	2 – 3	Yurieski Torreblanca
92 kg	Turtogtokh Luvsandorj	3 – 4	Lázaro Hernández
97 kg	Batsul Ulzisaikhan	1 – 11	Reineris Salas
125 kg	Natsagsürengiin Zolboo	2 – 2	Yudenny Alpajón

Azerbaijan 9 - 1 Kazakhstan
Weight	Azerbaijan	result	Kazakhstan
57 kg	Afgan Khashalov	8 – 1	Mukhambet Kuatbek
61 kg	Akhmednabi Gvarzatilov	15 – 15	Rassul Kaliyev
65 kg	Haji Aliyev	7 – 1	Sayatbek Okassov
70 kg	Joshgun Azimov	7 – 0	Meirzhan Ashirov
74 kg	Gadzhimurad Omarov	2 – 1	Daniyar Kaisanov
79 kg	Jabrayil Hasanov	8 – 1	Saken Aitzhanov
86 kg	Aleksandr Gostiyev	3 – 0	Elkhan Assadov
92 kg	Aslanbek Alborov	10 – 0	Iliskhan Chilaev
97 kg	Roman Bakirov	3 – 2	Mamed Ibragimov
125 kg	Jamaladdin Magomedov	3 – 3	Daulet Shabanbay

Round III

Mongolia 3 - 7 Azerbaijan
Weight	Mongolia	result	Azerbaijan
57 kg	Erdenebatyn Bekhbayar	2 – 1	Afgan Khashalov
61 kg	Tümenbilegiin Tüvshintulga	7 – 2	Akhmednabi Gvarzatilov
65 kg	Batchuluuny Batmagnai	–	Aghahuseyn Mustafayev
70 kg	Sanjaa Ganbayar	4 – 9	Joshgun Azimov
74 kg	Ganzorigiin Mandakhnaran	10 – 6	Gadzhimurad Omarov
79 kg	Gantulgyn Iderkhüü	2 – 12	Jabrayil Hasanov
86 kg	Orgodolyn Üitümen	3 – 10	Aleksandr Gostiyev
92 kg	Turtogtokh Luvsandorj	0 – 11	Aslanbek Alborov
97 kg	Batsul Ulzisaikhan	1 – 10	Roman Bakirov
125 kg	Natsagsürengiin Zolboo	2 – 3	Jamaladdin Magomedov

Cuba 5 - 5.df Kazakhstan
Weight	Cuba	result	Kazakhstan
57 kg	Reineri Andreu	4 – 1	Mukhambet Kuatbek
61 kg	Yowlys Bonne	4 – 6	Rassul Kaliyev
65 kg	Alejandro Valdés	10 – 0	Sayatbek Okassov
70 kg	Franklin Marén	7 – 1	Meirzhan Ashirov
74 kg	Liván López	–	Daniyar Kaisanov
79 kg	Yoan Zulueta	0 – 6^{F}	Saken Aitzhanov
86 kg	Yurieski Torreblanca	4 – 2	Elkhan Assadov
92 kg	Lázaro Hernández	2 – 12	Iliskhan Chilaev
97 kg	Reineris Salas	3 – 3	Mamed Ibragimov
125 kg	Yudenny Alpajón	0 – 10	Daulet Shabanbay

== Medal Matches ==
Medal Matches
First-Place Match

United States 6 - 4 Azerbaijan
Weight	United States	result	Azerbaijan
57 kg	Thomas Gilman	7 – 8	Giorgi Edisherashvili
61 kg	Kendric Maple	6 – 2	Afgan Khashalov
65 kg	Logan Stieber	6 – 3	Haji Aliyev
70 kg	James Green	4 – 4	Joshgun Azimov
74 kg	Jordan Burroughs	7 – 0	Gadzhimurad Omarov
79 kg	Kyle Dake	5 – 3	Jabrayil Hasanov
86 kg	David Taylor	12 – 2	Aleksandr Gostiyev
92 kg	J'den Cox	4 – 4	Aslanbek Alborov
97 kg	Kyle Snyder	14 – 3	Roman Bakirov
125 kg	Nick Gwiazdowski	3 – 4	Jamaladdin Magomedov

Third-Place Match

Japan 6 - 4 Cuba
Weight	Japan	result	Cuba
57 kg	Yuki Takahashi	7 – 5	Reineri Andreu
61 kg	Kazuya Koyanagi	9 – 6	Yowlys Bonne
65 kg	Daichi Takatani	10 – 8	Alejandro Valdés
70 kg	Keisuke Otoguro	4 – 8	Franklin Marén
74 kg	Yuhi Fujinami	16 – 5	Liván López
79 kg	Sohsuke Takatani	10 – 0	Yoan Zulueta
86 kg	Shota Shirai	1 – 4	Yurieski Torreblanca
92 kg	Takashi Ishiguro	4 – 4	Lázaro Hernández
97 kg	Taira Sonoda	0 – 12	Reineris Salas
125 kg	Taiki Yamamoto	6 – 5	Yudenny Alpajón

Fifth-Place Match

Georgia 6 - 4 Mongolia
Weight	Georgia	result	Mongolia
57 kg	Teimuraz Vanishvili	0 – 4	Erdenebatyn Bekhbayar
61 kg	Lasha Lomtadze	0 – 11	Tümenbilegiin Tüvshintulga
65 kg	Magomed Saidovi	–	by forfeit
70 kg	Levan Kelekhsashvili	2 – 1	Sanjaa Ganbayar
74 kg	Tarzan Maisuradze	7 – 1	Ganzorigiin Mandakhnaran
79 kg	Tariel Gaphrindashvili	22 – 17	Gantulgyn Iderkhüü
86 kg	David Khutsishvili	5 – 12	Orgodolyn Üitümen
92 kg	Dato Marsagishvili	5 – 0	Turtogtokh Luvsandorj
97 kg	Givi Matcharashvili	10 – 0	Batsul Ulzisaikhan
125 kg	Zviadi Metreveli	0 – 6	Natsagsürengiin Zolboo

Seventh-Place Match

India 0 - 10 Kazakhstan
Weight	India	result	Kazakhstan
57 kg	by forfeit	–	Mukhambet Kuatbek
61 kg	Sandeep Tomar	6 – 10	Rassul Kaliyev
65 kg	Sharvan Sharvan	0 – 10	Sayatbek Okassov
70 kg	Arun Kumar	0 – 6	Meirzhan Ashirov
74 kg	Vinod Kumar Omprakash	7 – 13	Daniyar Kaisanov
79 kg	Sachin Giri	0 – 2	Saken Aitzhanov
86 kg	Pawan Kumar	2 – 3	Elkhan Assadov
92 kg	Deepak Punia	3 – 10	Iliskhan Chilaev
97 kg	Viky Viky	0 – 10	Mamed Ibragimov
125 kg	Singh Pushpender	0 – 10	Daulet Shabanbay

== Final classement ==
Team	Pld	W	L
United States	4	4	0
Azerbaijan	4	3	1
Japan	4	3	1
Cuba	4	1	3
Georgia	4	2	2
Mongolia	4	1	3
Kazakhstan	4	2	4
India	4	0	4

== See also ==
- 2018 Wrestling World Cup - Men's Greco-Roman
- 2018 Wrestling World Cup - Women's freestyle
