= Keisuke Otoguro =

Japanese wrestler

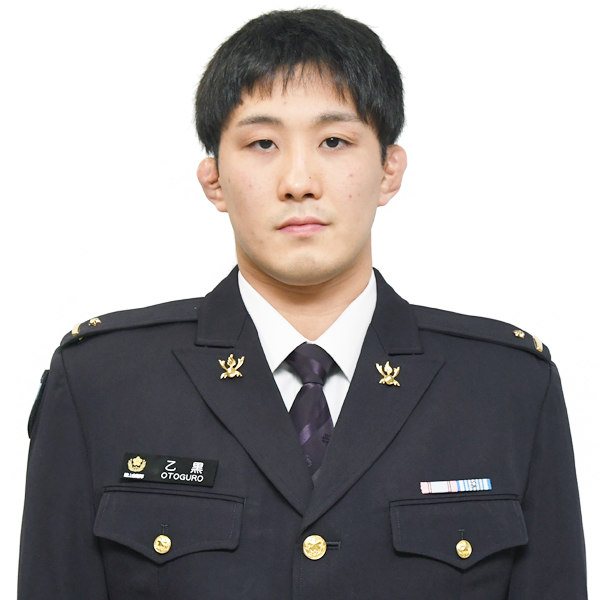
- Otoguro in 2021

Personal information
- Born: 16 November 1996 (age 29) Fuefuki, Japan
- Height: 178 cm (5 ft 10 in)

Sport
- Sport: Wrestling
- Weight class: 74 kg
Medal record
Men's freestyle wrestling
Representing Japan
World Cup
Bronze medal – third place	2018 Iowa	70 kg
Japan National Championships
Gold medal – first place	2019 Tokyo	74 kg
Bronze medal – third place	2018 Tokyo	70 kg
All-Japan Invitational Championships
Silver medal – second place	2018 Tokyo	70 kg
Asian Junior Championships
Bronze medal – third place	2016 Manila	66 kg
World Cadet Championships
Bronze medal – third place	2012 Baku	50 kg
Bronze medal – third place	2011 Szombathely	46 kg

Keisuke Otoguro (乙黒圭祐, Otoguro Keisuke, born 16 November 1996) is a Japanese wrestler. He competed in the men's freestyle 74 kg event at the 2020 Summer Olympics held in Tokyo, Japan.

At the 2018 World Wrestling Championships held in Budapest, Hungary, he competed in the men's 70 kg event where he was eliminated in his first match by Ikhtiyor Navruzov of Uzbekistan.
