= 2014 Yasar Dogu Tournament =

Yasar Dogu 2014
- Host city: Istanbul, Turkey
- Dates: 15–16 February
- Stadium: Ahmet Comert Sports Complex

Champions
- Freestyle: Turkey

The 42nd Yasar Dogu Tournament 2014, was a wrestling event held in Istanbul, Turkey between 15 and 16 February 2014.

This international tournament includes competition men's freestyle wrestling. This ranking tournament was held was held in honor of the Olympic Champion, Yaşar Doğu.

== Medal table ==
* Host nation (Turkey)

Rank	Nation	Gold	Silver	Bronze	Total
1	Turkey*	2	1	6	9
2	United States	2	1	2	5
3	Azerbaijan	1	2	2	5
4	Mongolia	1	1	1	3
5	Russia	1	0	1	2
6	Italy	1	0	0	1
7	Iran	0	2	3	5
8	Japan	0	1	1	2
Totals (8 entries)		8	8	16	32

== Team ranking ==
Rank	Men's freestyle	
Rank	Team	Points
1	Turkey	147
2	United States	66
3	Azerbaijan	54
4	Iran	46
5	Mongolia	35
6	Russia	29
7	Japan	29
8	Italy	10
9	Kyrgyzstan	10
10	Turkmenistan	9

== Medal overview ==
=== Men's freestyle ===
Event	Gold	Silver	Bronze
57 kg	Batboldyn Nomin; Mongolia	Fumitaka Morishita; Japan	Yuki Takahashi; Japan
57 kg	Batboldyn Nomin; Mongolia	Fumitaka Morishita; Japan	Sezar Akgül; Turkey
61 kg	Jimmy Kennedy; United States	Enkhsaikhany Nyam-Ochir; Mongolia	Akhmednabi Gvarzatilov; Azerbaijan
61 kg	Jimmy Kennedy; United States	Enkhsaikhany Nyam-Ochir; Mongolia	Murshid Mutalimov; Russia
65 kg	Frank Chamizo; Italy	Magomed Muslimov; Azerbaijan	Mustafa Kaya; Turkey
65 kg	Frank Chamizo; Italy	Magomed Muslimov; Azerbaijan	Ganzorigiin Mandakhnaran; Mongolia
70 kg	Yakup Gör; Turkey	Emin Azizov; Azerbaijan	Mustafa Kuyucu; Turkey
70 kg	Yakup Gör; Turkey	Emin Azizov; Azerbaijan	Peyman Yarahmadi; Iran
74 kg	Nick Marable; United States	Morteza Rezaei; Iran	Jordan Burroughs; United States
74 kg	Nick Marable; United States	Morteza Rezaei; Iran	Soner Demirtaş; Turkey
86 kg	Abdulrashid Sadulaev; Russia	Phillip Keddy; United States	Alireza Karimi; Iran
86 kg	Abdulrashid Sadulaev; Russia	Phillip Keddy; United States	Mohammad Javad Ebrahimi; Iran
97 kg	Khetag Gazyumov; Azerbaijan	Ali Bönceoğlu; Turkey	Roman Bakirov; Azerbaijan
97 kg	Khetag Gazyumov; Azerbaijan	Ali Bönceoğlu; Turkey	İbrahim Bölükbaşı; Turkey
125 kg	Taha Akgül; Turkey	Komeil Ghasemi; Iran	Dom Bradley; United States
125 kg	Taha Akgül; Turkey	Komeil Ghasemi; Iran	Yunus Emre Dede; Turkey

== Participating nations ==
198 wrestlers from 17 countries:

1. Azerbaijan (12)
2. Bulgaria (6)
3. Iran (8)
4. Italy (1)
5. Japan (9)
6. Kazakhstan (14)
7. Kyrgyzstan (6)
8. Mongolia (15)
9. Macedonia (3)
10. Puerto Rico (4)
11. Russia (17)
12. Tajikistan (3)
13. Turkmenistan (8)
14. Tunisia (7)
15. Turkey (70) (Host)
16. United States (14)
17. Uzbekistan (1)

== See also ==
- 2014 Vehbi Emre Tournament
