= Wrestling at the 2010 Central American and Caribbean Games =

Held in Mayagüez, Puerto Rico

- Venue: Aguada Coliseum
- Location: Mayagüez, Puerto Rico
- Dates: 23–27 July

The Wrestling competition at the 2010 Central American and Caribbean Games was held in Mayagüez, Puerto Rico.

The tournament was scheduled to be held from 23 to 27 July at the Aguada Coliseum at Porta del Sol.

== Medal summary ==
=== Men's events ===
Event	Gold	Silver	Bronze
Greco-Roman 55 kg	Jorge Cardozo (VEN)	Francisco Encarnación (DOM)	German Díaz (PUR); Andres Taborda (COL)
Greco-Roman 66 kg	Anyelo Mota (DOM)	Manuel Torres (VEN)	Ulises Barragán (MEX); Jefrin Mejía (HON)
Greco-Roman 74 kg	Juan Escobar (MEX)	Hansel Mercedes (DOM)	Alexander Brazon (VEN); Otoniel Pérez (PUR)
Greco-Roman 84 kg	Cristian Mosquera (COL)	Eddy Bartolozzy (VEN)	José Arias (DOM); José Mendoza (MEX)
Greco-Roman 96 kg	Erwin Caraballo (VEN)	Joel López (MEX)	Julio Gesurrun (DOM); Randy Lambert (HON)
Greco-Roman 120 kg	Rafael Barreno (VEN)	Irving Herrera (PAN)	José Erazo (ESA); Ramón García (DOM)
Freestyle 55 kg	Fredy Serrano (COL)	Arturo Chávez (MEX)	Fernando Paredes (VEN); Manuel Ramirez (PUR)
Freestyle 60 kg	Gabriel García (DOM)	Nelson Garcia (COL)	Franklin Gómez (PUR); Luis Portillo (ESA)
Freestyle 66 kg	Pedro Soto (PUR)	Edison Hurtado (COL)	Elvis Fuentes (VEN); Angel Ramírez (DOM)
Freestyle 74 kg	Ricardo Roberty (VEN)	Ysidro Alexis (DOM)	Rosalio Medrano (COL); Eduardo Valencia (MEX)
Freestyle 84 kg	Jaime Espinal (PUR)	Jarlis Mosquera (COL)	Jose Díaz (VEN); Rodolfo White (PAN)
Freestyle 96 kg	Luis Vivenes (VEN)	Manuel Simonó (DOM)	William Serrano (ESA); Israel Silva (MEX)
Freestyle 120 kg	Ihosvany Negret (PUR)	Jesse Ruíz (MEX)	José Erazo (ESA); Carlos Félix (DOM)

=== Women's events ===
Event	Gold	Silver	Bronze
Freestyle 48 kg	Mayelis Caripa (VEN)	Carolina Castillo (COL)	Guadalupe Pérez (MEX); Nesmarie Rodríguez (PUR)
Freestyle 51 kg	Aguis Rivas (VEN)	Enid Rivera (PUR)	Carolina González (DOM); Graciela Martínez (ESA)
Freestyle 59 kg	Jackeline Rentería (COL)	Anakarina González (VEN)	Wendy García (MEX); Yuri Mata (ESA)
