= Nick Marable =

American wrestler (born 1987)

Personal information
- Born: May 7, 1987 (age 39) Memphis, Tennessee, U.S.
- Home town: Collierville, Tennessee, U.S
Medal record
Men's freestyle wrestling
Representing the United States
World Cup
Silver medal – second place	2014 Los Angeles	Team
Silver medal – second place	2015 Los Angeles	Team
Pan American Championships
Gold medal – first place	2011 Rionegro	74 kg
Bronze medal – third place	2013 Panama City	74 kg
Yaşar Doğu Tournament
Gold medal – first place	2014 Istanbul	74 kg
Dan Kolov & Nikola Petrov Tournament
Gold medal – first place	2013 Plovdiv	74 kg
Golden Grand Prix
Gold medal – first place	2014 Paris	74 kg
US Open Championships
Gold medal – first place	2014 Las Vegas	70 kg
Gold medal – first place	2015 Las Vegas	70 kg
Bronze medal – third place	2013 Las Vegas	74 kg
Men's collegiate wrestling
Representing the Missouri Tigers
NCAA Division I Championships
Bronze medal – third place	2008 St. Louis	165 lb
Big 12 Championships
Gold medal – first place	2008 Stillwater	165 lb
Gold medal – first place	2009 Lincoln	165 lb
Gold medal – first place	2010 Norman	165 lb

Nick Marable (born May 7, 1987) of Collierville, Tennessee, is an American former freestyle wrestler for Sunkist Kids Wrestling Club. He represented the United States at the 2014 World Wrestling Championships. Marable later served as the assistant wrestling coach for West Virginia University.

== High school ==
Marable attended Christian Brothers High School in Memphis, Tennessee. Marable was a three-time state finalist and two-time state champion at the Tennessee state tournament, winning state titles in 2004 and 2005, and finishing runner-up in 2003. He also won the 2003 U.S. Cadet Freestyle National Championship at 145-pounds.

== College ==
At the University of Missouri in Columbia, Missouri, Marable was a three-time NCAA qualifier and two-time NCAA All-American, finishing third in 2008 and seventh in 2009. Marable finished his college career with 116 wins, which was the eighth-most in Missouri history at the time of his graduation.

== Senior level ==
Marable would have continued wrestling success at the international level upon graduating college in 2010. His notable tournament wins include the 2011 Pan American Championships, 2013 NYAC International, 2014 Yasar Dogu, 2014 Grand Prix of Paris, and the 2015 Dave Schultz Memorial.

At the 2014 Yasar Dogu Tournament, in the quarter-finals, Marable beat Jordan Burroughs 4–4 on criteria. This marked the first loss of Jordan Burroughs' career at the senior level and broke Burroughs' unbroken win streak since 2011.

Marable would represent the United States at the 2014 World Wrestling Championships, finishing 2-1 and in 8th place in the 70 kg weight class after losing to two-time bronze medalist Ali Shabanau.
