= Wrestling at the 2019 Pan American Games – Men's freestyle 74 kg =

Men's Freestyle 74 kg at the 2019 Pan American Games
- Venue: Miguel Grau Coliseum
- Dates: August 10, 2019
- Competitors: 8 from 8 nations

Medalists
Gold medal	Jordan Burroughs	United States
Silver medal	Franklin Gómez	Puerto Rico
Bronze medal	Geandry Garzón	Cuba
Bronze medal	Jevon Balfour	Canada

The men's freestyle 74 kg competition of the Wrestling events at the 2019 Pan American Games in Lima was held on August 10, 2019 at the Miguel Grau Coliseum.

== Results ==
All times are local (UTC−5)

=== Final ===
Quarterfinals		Semifinals		Finals
Julio Rodríguez (DOM)	2
Geandry Garzón (CUB)	5	Geandry Garzón (CUB)	4
Abel Herrera (PER)	0	Jordan Burroughs (USA)	15
Jordan Burroughs (USA)	10			Jordan Burroughs (USA)	4
Jevon Balfour (CAN)	12			Franklin Gómez (PUR)	1
Hernán Guzmán (COL)	4	Jevon Balfour (CAN)	0
Jorge Llano (ARG)	0	Franklin Gómez (PUR)	11
Franklin Gómez (PUR)	10

=== Repechage ===
Bronze medal match
Abel Herrera (PER)	0
Geandry Garzón (CUB)	11
Jorge Llano (ARG)	0
Jevon Balfour (CAN)	10
