= Talgat Ilyasov =

Australian wrestler

- Born: 25 February 1981 (age 45); Gazalkent, Uzbekistan
- Nationality: Australian

Other information
- Notable club: Absolute MMA
- Mixed martial arts record from Sherdog

Talgat Ilyasov (Kazakh: Талғат Ілиясов born 25 February 1981) is a Kazakh-Australian wrestler. He competed in the men's 74 kilogram freestyle wrestling competition at the 2016 Summer Olympics.

Ilyasov holds the position of President of Wrestling Australia.

== Mixed martial arts record ==
Professional record breakdown
1 match	1 win	0 losses
By submission	1	0

Res.	Record	Opponent	Method	Event	Date	Round	Time	Location	Notes
Win	1–0	Amin Yaqubi	Submission (arm triangle choke)	Australian Fighting Championship 10	August 16, 2014	2	1:36	Melbourne, Australia	
