= Jakob Makarashvili =

Georgian freestyle wrestler

Jakob Makarashvili (born December 28, 1985) is a Georgian freestyle wrestler. He competed in the men's freestyle 74 kg event at the 2016 Summer Olympics, in which he was eliminated in the quarterfinals by Jabrayil Hasanov. Jakob Makarashvili was also a 2016 European Championship bronze medalist.
