= Daniyar Kaisanov =

Kazakhstani freestyle wrestler

Personal information
- Native name: Данияр Әлібекұлы Қайсанов
- Full name: Daniyar Alibekovich Kaisanov
- Nationality: Kazakhstan
- Born: 18 July 1993 (age 33) Kazakhstan
- Height: 174 cm (5 ft 9 in)

Sport
- Country: Kazakhstan
- Sport: Amateur wrestling
- Weight class: 74 kg
- Event: Freestyle

Achievements and titles
- Olympic finals: 5th (2020)
- World finals: (bronze) (2019)
- Regional finals: (gold) (2020) (gold) (2019) (bronze) (2018)
Medal record
Men's freestyle wrestling
Representing Kazakhstan
World Championships
Bronze medal – third place	2019 Nur-Sultan	74 kg
Asian Games
Silver medal – second place	2018 Jakarta	74 kg
Asian Championships
Gold medal – first place	2019 Xi'an	74 kg
Gold medal – first place	2020 New Delhi	74 kg
Bronze medal – third place	2018 Bishkek	74 kg
Grand Prix
Gold medal – first place	2022 Bucharest	74 kg
Bronze medal – third place	2021 Warsaw	74 kg
Bronze medal – third place	2021 Rome	74 kg
Bronze medal – third place	2022 Taraz	74 kg
Bronze medal – third place	2023 Budapest	79 kg

Daniyar Kaisanov (born 18 July 1993) is a Kazakhstani freestyle wrestler. He is a two-time gold medalist at the Asian Wrestling Championships, a silver medalist at the Asian Games and a bronze medalist at the World Wrestling Championships. He also represented Kazakhstan at the 2020 Summer Olympics held in Tokyo, Japan.

== Career ==
Kaisanov represented Kazakhstan at the 2018 Asian Games and he won the silver medal in the men's 74 kg event. In the final, he lost against Bekzod Abdurakhmonov of Uzbekistan.

Kaisanov won the gold medal in the men's 74 kg event at the 2019 Asian Wrestling Championships held in Xi'an, China. In 2020, he also won the gold medal in the men's 74 kg event at the Asian Wrestling Championships held in New Delhi, India.

In 2019, Kaisanov competed at the World Wrestling Championships in the men's 74 kg event. At the time he didn't win the bronze medal but he was awarded one of the bronze medals after Zelimkhan Khadjiev tested positive for doping. As a result, he qualified to represent Kazakhstan at the 2020 Summer Olympics in Tokyo, Japan. In March 2021, Kaisanov won one of the bronze medals in the 74 kg event at the Matteo Pellicone Ranking Series 2021 held in Rome, Italy. In June 2021, he won one of the bronze medals in the men's 74 kg event at the 2021 Waclaw Ziolkowski Memorial held in Warsaw, Poland.

Kaisanov lost his bronze medal match against Bekzod Abdurakhmonov of Uzbekistan in the men's 74 kg event at the 2020 Summer Olympics held in Tokyo, Japan.

== Achievements ==
Year	Tournament	Location	Result	Event
2018	Asian Championships	Bishkek, Kyrgyzstan	3rd	Freestyle 74 kg
2018	Asian Games	Jakarta, Indonesia	2nd	Freestyle 74 kg
2019	Asian Championships	Xi'an, China	1st	Freestyle 74 kg
2019	World Championships	Nur-Sultan, Kazakhstan	3rd	Freestyle 74 kg
2020	Asian Championships	New Delhi, India	1st	Freestyle 74 kg
