= Ricardo Roberty =

Venezuelan freestyle wrestler

Personal information
- Full name: Ricardo Antonio Roberty Moreno
- Nationality: Venezuela
- Born: 12 October 1982 (age 43) Acarigua, Portuguesa, Venezuela
- Height: 1.72 m (5 ft 7 1/2 in)
- Weight: 74 kg (163 lb)

Sport
- Sport: Wrestling
- Event: Freestyle
- Club: Marcial Andrades
- Coached by: Rafael Roberty
Medal record
Men's freestyle wrestling
Representing Venezuela
Pan American Games
Bronze medal – third place	2011 Guadalajara	74 kg
Central American and Caribbean Games
Gold medal – first place	2010 Mayagüez	74 kg
Silver medal – second place	2006 Cartagena	74 kg

Ricardo Antonio Roberty Moreno (born October 12, 1982 in Acarigua, Portuguesa) is an amateur Venezuelan freestyle wrestler, who competed in the men's middleweight category. He won a bronze medal for the 74 kg division at the 2011 Pan American Games in Guadalajara, Mexico. Roberty also captured a silver medal in the same division at the 2006 Central American and Caribbean Games in Cartagena, Colombia, and eventually defeated Dominican Republic's Ysidro Alexis for the gold at the 2010 Central American and Caribbean Games in Mayagüez, Puerto Rico.

Roberty represented Venezuela at the 2012 Summer Olympics in London, where he competed for the men's 74 kg class. He lost the qualifying round match to Guinea-Bissau wrestler and two-time Olympian Augusto Midana, with a three-set technical score (0–1, 1–0, 1–2), and a classification point score of 1–3.
