= Sohsuke Takatani =

Japanese freestyle wrestler

Personal information
- Nickname: Tackle Prince
- Nationality: Japan
- Born: 5 April 1989 (age 37) Kyōtango, Kyoto, Japan
- Height: 1.78 m (5 ft 10 in)
- Weight: 88 kg (194 lb)

Sport
- Country: Japan
- Sport: Wrestling
- Weight class: 86 kg (190 lb)
- Event: Freestyle
- Club: ALSOK
- Coached by: Masanori Ohashi
Medal record
Representing Japan
World Championships
Silver medal – second place	2014 Tashkent	74 kg
World Cup
Bronze medal – third place	2018 Iowa	Team
Japan National Championships
Gold medal – first place	2020 Tokyo	92 kg
Gold medal – first place	2019 Tokyo	86 kg
Gold medal – first place	2018 Tokyo	86 kg
All-Japan Invitational Championships
Gold medal – first place	2018 Tokyo	79 kg
Olympic Qualification Tournament
Gold medal – first place	2021 Sofia	86 kg
Bronze medal – third place	2021 Almaty	86 kg
Silver medal – second place	2016 Astana	74 kg
Silver medal – second place	2012 Astana	74 kg

Sohsuke Takatani (高谷 惣亮, Takatani Sōsuke; born 5 April 1989) is an amateur Japanese freestyle wrestler, who competes in the middleweight category (under 74 kg).

Takatani represented Japan at the 2012 Summer Olympics in London, but was eliminated in the qualifying round.

At the 2016 Olympics he reached the quarterfinals, beating Talgat Ilyasov and Zelimkhan Khadjiev before losing to Galymzhan Userbayev.

Takatani also competed for Japan at the 2020 Summer Olympics.

He competed in the 92 kg event at the 2022 World Wrestling Championships held in Belgrade, Serbia.
