= Galymzhan Usserbayev =

Kazakhstani freestyle wrestler

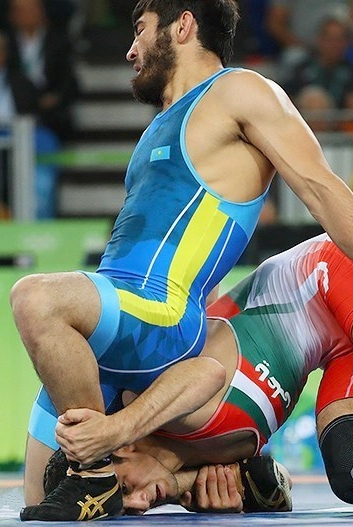
- Usserbayev (top) at the 2016 Olympics

Personal information
- Nationality: Kazakhstan
- Born: 19 December 1988 (age 37) Kyzylorda, Kazakh SSR, Soviet Union
- Height: 173 cm (5 ft 8 in)
- Weight: 79 kg (174 lb)

Sport
- Country: Kazakhstan
- Sport: Freestyle wrestling
- Weight class: 74 kg
- Club: CSKA
- Coached by: Sergey Beloglazov
Medal record
Representing Kazakhstan
Men's freestyle wrestling
Asian Wrestling Championships
| Bronze medal – third place | 2019 Xi'an | 79 kg |
Military World Games
| Bronze medal – third place | 2015 Mungyeong | 74 kg |
World Military Championships
| Gold medal – first place | 2014 Fort Dix | 74 kg |
| Bronze medal – third place | 2018 Moscow | 79 kg |
Olympic Qualification Tournament
| Gold medal – first place | 2016 Astana | 74 kg |

Galymzhan Usserbayev (born 19 December 1988) is a freestyle wrestler from Kazakhstan.

== 2014 season ==
He competed at 74 kg freestyle at the 2014 World Wrestling Championships where he won his first match, but lost his second.

== 2015 season ==
He won a bronze medal at the 2015 Military World Games.

== 2016 season ==
He won the 74 kg freestyle competition at the 2016 Asian Wrestling Olympic Qualification Tournament to earn a berth at the 2016 Olympics. At the Olympics he lost a bronze medal match to Soner Demirtaş.

== 2021 season ==
In 2021, he won the gold medal in the 79 kg event at the Matteo Pellicone Ranking Series 2021 held in Rome, Italy.
