= Eduardo Valencia =

Venezuelan baseball player (born 2000)

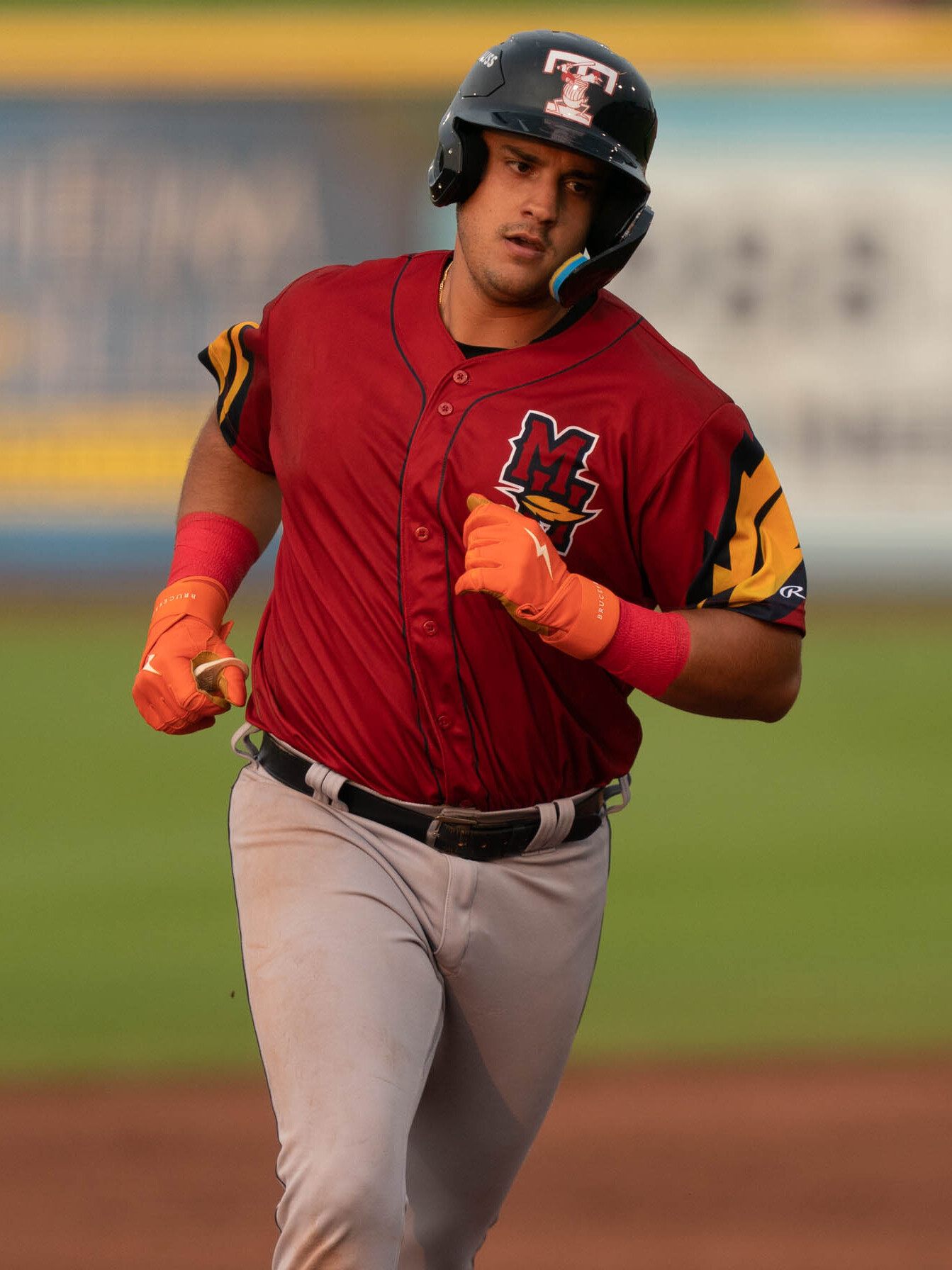
- Valencia with the Toledo Mud Hens in 2025

Detroit Tigers – No. 32
- Catcher / First baseman
- Born: January 25, 2000 (age 26); Valencia, Venezuela
- Bats: Right Throws: Right

MLB debut
- July 9, 2026, for the Detroit Tigers

MLB statistics (through 2026 season)
- Batting average: .341
- Home runs: 8
- Runs batted in: 21
- Stats at Baseball Reference

Teams
- Detroit Tigers (2026–present)

Eduardo Andres Valencia (born January 25, 2000) is a Venezuelan professional baseball catcher and first baseman for the Detroit Tigers of Major League Baseball (MLB).

== Career ==
Valencia signed with the Detroit Tigers as an international free agent in April 2018.

In 2025, Valencia made 103 appearances split between the Double-A Erie SeaWolves and Triple-A Toledo Mud Hens, batting a combined .311/.382/.559 with 24 home runs and 95 RBI. On November 18, 2025, the Tigers added Valencia to their 40-man roster to protect him from the Rule 5 draft.

Valencia was optioned to Triple-A Toledo to begin the 2026 season. On July 9, 2026, he was called up to give the Tigers an extra catcher while Dillon Dingler recovered from a badly bruised thumb. Valencia made his Major League debut that night as a pinch hitter in the seventh inning, where he hit a home run in his first at-bat against Hogan Harris of the Athletics. He is the tenth Tiger to hit a home run in his first MLB at-bat, but only the second to do so in a pinch hitting role, following Gates Brown in 1963. Valencia hit a two-run walk-off home run on September 26 against the Pittsburgh Pirates in Justin Verlander's final MLB game. The homer turned a potential Verlander loss to a no-decision. For the 2026 season, Valencia hit .341 with 8 home runs and 21 RBI in 42 games.

== See also ==
- List of Major League Baseball players from Venezuela
- List of Major League Baseball players with a home run in their first major league at bat
