= Evgheni Nedealco =

Moldovan freestyle wrestler

Personal information
- Born: January 3, 1990 (age 36)

Sport
- Country: Moldova
- Sport: Freestyle wrestling

Evgheni Nedealco, also known as Yevgeny Nedealco, is a Moldovan freestyle wrestler.

He was a quarterfinalist at the 2015 European Games.

At the 2016 World Wrestling Olympic Qualification Tournament 1 he won a bronze medal and a wrestle-off to secure a spot at the 2016 Olympics.
