= Jevon Balfour =

Canadian wrestler (born 1994)

Personal information
- Born: 3 December 1994 (age 31) Scarborough, Ontario, Canada
- Height: 177 cm (5 ft 10 in)
- Weight: 74 kg (163 lb)

Sport
- Sport: Wrestling
- Event: Freestyle wrestling
- Club: Brock Wrestling Club
Medal record
Men's freestyle wrestling
Representing Canada
Commonwealth Games
Silver medal – second place	2014 Glasgow	65 kg
Bronze medal – third place	2018 Gold Coast	74 kg
Pan American Games
Bronze medal – third place	2019 Lima	74 kg

Jevon Balfour (born 3 December 1994) is a Canadian wrestler. He won a silver medal at the 2014 Commonwealth Games, a bronze medal at the 2018 Commonwealth Games and a bronze medal at the 2019 Pan American Games. He finished in 7th place at the 2014 World Junior Wrestling Championships. Balfour has won five Canadian National Championships.
