= Zelimkhan Khadjiev =

Russian-French freestyle wrestler

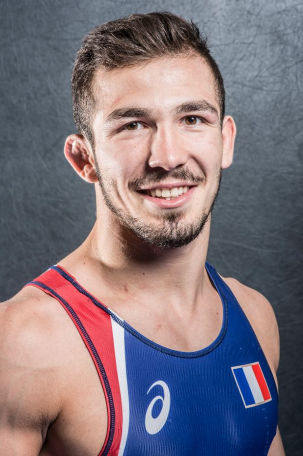
- Zelimkhan Khadjiev

Personal information
- Nationality: Russian; France
- Born: Зелимхан Хаджиев; 20 May 1994 (age 32) Solnichnoe village, Khasavyurtovsky District, Dagestan, Russia
- Height: 175 cm (5 ft 9 in)
- Weight: 80 kg (176 lb)

Sport
- Country: France
- Sport: Wrestling
- Weight class: 74 kg
- Event: Freestyle
Medal record
Men's freestyle wrestling
Representing France
European Championships
Silver medal – second place	2018 Kaspiysk	74 kg
Silver medal – second place	2019 Bucharest	74 kg
Silver medal – second place	2025 Bratislava	79 kg
European U23 Championships
Silver medal – second place	2017 Szombathely	74 kg
Junior World Championships
Gold medal – first place	2014 Zagreb	74 kg
Junior European Championships
Bronze medal – third place	2013 Skopje	74 kg
Cadet European Championships
Bronze medal – third place	2010 Sarajevo	58 kg

Zelimkhan Khadjiev (Russian: Зелимхан Хаджиев; born May 20, 1994, in Dagestan) is a Russian-French freestyle wrestler of Chechen heritage. He competed in the men's freestyle 74 kg event at the 2016 Summer Olympics, in which he was eliminated in the round of 16 by Sohsuke Takatani.

He competed at the 2024 European Wrestling Olympic Qualification Tournament in Baku, Azerbaijan hoping to qualify for the 2024 Summer Olympics in Paris, France. He was eliminated in his first match and he did not qualify for the Olympics.
