= Kyle Dake =

American wrestler (born 1991)

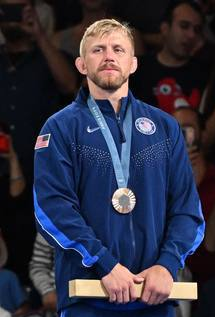
- Dake at the 2024 Summer Olympics

Personal information
- Full name: Kyle Douglas Dake
- Born: February 25, 1991 (age 35) Ithaca, New York, U.S.
- Height: 5 ft 10 in (178 cm)
- Weight: 74 kg (163 lb)
- Website: kyledake.com

Sport
- Country: United States
- Sport: Wrestling
- Events: Freestyle, Greco-Roman, and Folkstyle
- College team: Cornell
- Club: Nittany Lion Wrestling Club; Titan Mercury Wrestling Club; Spartan Combat RTC
- Team: USA
- Coached by: Cael Sanderson; Rob Koll
Medal record
Men's freestyle wrestling
Representing the United States
Olympic Games
Bronze medal – third place	2020 Tokyo	74 kg
Bronze medal – third place	2024 Paris	74 kg
World Championships
Gold medal – first place	2018 Budapest	79 kg
Gold medal – first place	2019 Nur-Sultan	79 kg
Gold medal – first place	2021 Oslo	74 kg
Gold medal – first place	2022 Belgrade	74 kg
Gold medal – first place	2026 Astana	86 kg
Silver medal – second place	2023 Belgrade	74 kg
World Cup
Gold medal – first place	2018 Iowa City	Team
Pan American Championships
Gold medal – first place	2021 Guatemala	74 kg
Gold medal – first place	2022 Acapulco	74 kg
Gold medal – first place	2023 Buenos Aires	74 kg
Gold medal – first place	2024 Acapulco	74 kg
Golden Grand Prix Ivan Yarygin
Silver medal – second place	2018 Krasnoyarsk	79 kg
US Open Championships
Gold medal – first place	2015 Las Vegas	86 kg
Gold medal – first place	2018 Las Vegas	79 kg
Gold medal – first place	2026 Las Vegas	86 kg
Silver medal – second place	2017 Las Vegas	74 kg
Silver medal – second place	2025 Las Vegas	86 kg
Men's collegiate wrestling
Representing the Cornell Big Red
NCAA Division I Championships
Gold medal – first place	2010 Omaha	141 lb
Gold medal – first place	2011 Philadelphia	149 lb
Gold medal – first place	2012 St. Louis	157 lb
Gold medal – first place	2013 Des Moines	165 lb
EIWA Championships
Gold medal – first place	2010 Bethlehem	141 lb
Gold medal – first place	2012 Princeton	157 lb
Gold medal – first place	2013 New Brunswick	165 lb
Silver medal – second place	2011 Lewisburg	149 lb

Kyle Douglas Dake (born February 25, 1991) is an American freestyle wrestler and graduated folkstyle wrestler who competes at 86 kilograms. He currently competes in the Cruiserweight division of Real American Freestyle (RAF), where he is the current RAF Cruiserweight Champion.

Dake is a five-time World Champion, winning at 86 kilos in 2026 and back-to-back titles twice, at 79 kilos in 2018 and 2019 and 74 kilos in 2021 and 2022. He earned bronze medals at the 2020 Tokyo Olympics and 2024 Paris Olympics.

In college, he became the third four-time NCAA Division I National Champion in history, and the only one to ever do so in four different weight classes, and without a redshirt season. He was named the Dan Hodge Trophy winner and Schalles Award winner as a senior and he also claimed three EIWA titles, competing out of Cornell University.

== Trajectory ==
=== Early and high school years ===
Born in Ithaca, Dake was raised in Lansing, New York, where he started wrestling at the age of four, following in his grandfather's and father's footsteps, both coaches of the sport. He went on to attend Lansing High School, where he became a two-time NYSPHSAA Division II state champion for the wrestling program, which was founded by his grandfather. With a 224–14 record in-state, Dake was also a three-time NHSCA National champion.

While Dake was an All-American at the FILA US Freestyle National Championships in multiple occasions, his biggest success in the age-group came in Greco-Roman in 2008 when he became the Junior US National champion and placed fourteenth at the Junior World Championships. Afterwards, he committed to Cornell University in October 2008.

=== Cornell University ===
With his first season being 2009–2010 and his last 2012–2013, Dake became only the third wrestler to win four NCAA Division I Wrestling titles. Among four-time champions, Dake became the first wrestler to win each title in four different weight classes, and the only one to not redshirt a season during his college career. Following his senior season, WIN magazine awarded Dake the Dan Hodge Trophy as the most outstanding college wrestler and the Wade Schalles Award for best collegiate pinner.

Dake notably became a US University National finalist in 2011 and placed fourth at the 2012 US Olympic Team Trials in freestyle during his collegiate career. During this run, he remarkably posted wins over NCAA champions J.P O'Connor and David Taylor, as well as multiple-time All-Americans Tyler Caldwell and Nick Marable.

=== Post-collegiate career ===
==== 2013–2014 ====
After graduation, Dake competed at the 2013 US World Team Trials in June in an attempt of representing the US at the 2013 World Championships, but after defeating Trent Paulson, David Taylor, and Andrew Howe, he was unable to win the best-of-three finale, falling to the defending Olympic and World Champion Jordan Burroughs, who would go on to again claim the World Championship.

While competing at November's 2013 Heydar Aliyev Golden Grand Prix in Azerbaijan, Dake broke his hand, though still topped two-time World Champion from Russia Denis Tsargush, before losing twice to place fifth. Due to his injury, Dake was unable to continue competing for the rest of 2013, and only came back in February 2014 at his championship performance from the Granma Cup, but after more injuries and infections, he sat out until November 2014, where he competed in and won a single match.

==== 2015–2017 ====
During 2015, he competed at the US World Team Trials after winning the Northeastern Regionals, and was able to advance to the best–of–three finals. Dake was once again defeated twice in a row by Jordan Burroughs, who would go on to claim his third World Championship. He did not compete until December, when he moved up to 86 kilograms for the US National Championship, placing first after beating David Taylor, Jon Reader, Keith Gavin and Tyrel Todd. In 2016, his appearances were also scarce, as he only competed at the Alexander Medved Open, placing ninth, and at the US Olympic Team Trials,. At the trials, Dake defeated Richard Perry and David Taylor to advance to the best-of-three finals. Facing J'den Cox, Dake was defeated in the first match, and after coming back to win the second match, he was defeated again in the third match, placing second.

In 2017, Dake moved back down to 74 kilograms, and claimed the Paris Grand Prix in January after defeating Alex Dieringer in the finals. At the US Open in April, Dake once again defeated Dieringer in the semifinals, but lost to Jordan Burroughs on criteria and placed second. At the US World Team Trials, Dake defeated two-time NCAA champion Isaiah Martinez and three-time NCAA champion Alex Dieringer to make the best-of-three finals. Facing Jordan Burroughs, Dake took the first match on criteria, but lost twice in a row by decision. He competed one more time in December, when he moved up to 79 kilograms and helped Team USA reach second place at the Clubs World Cup with six technical falls.

==== 2018 ====
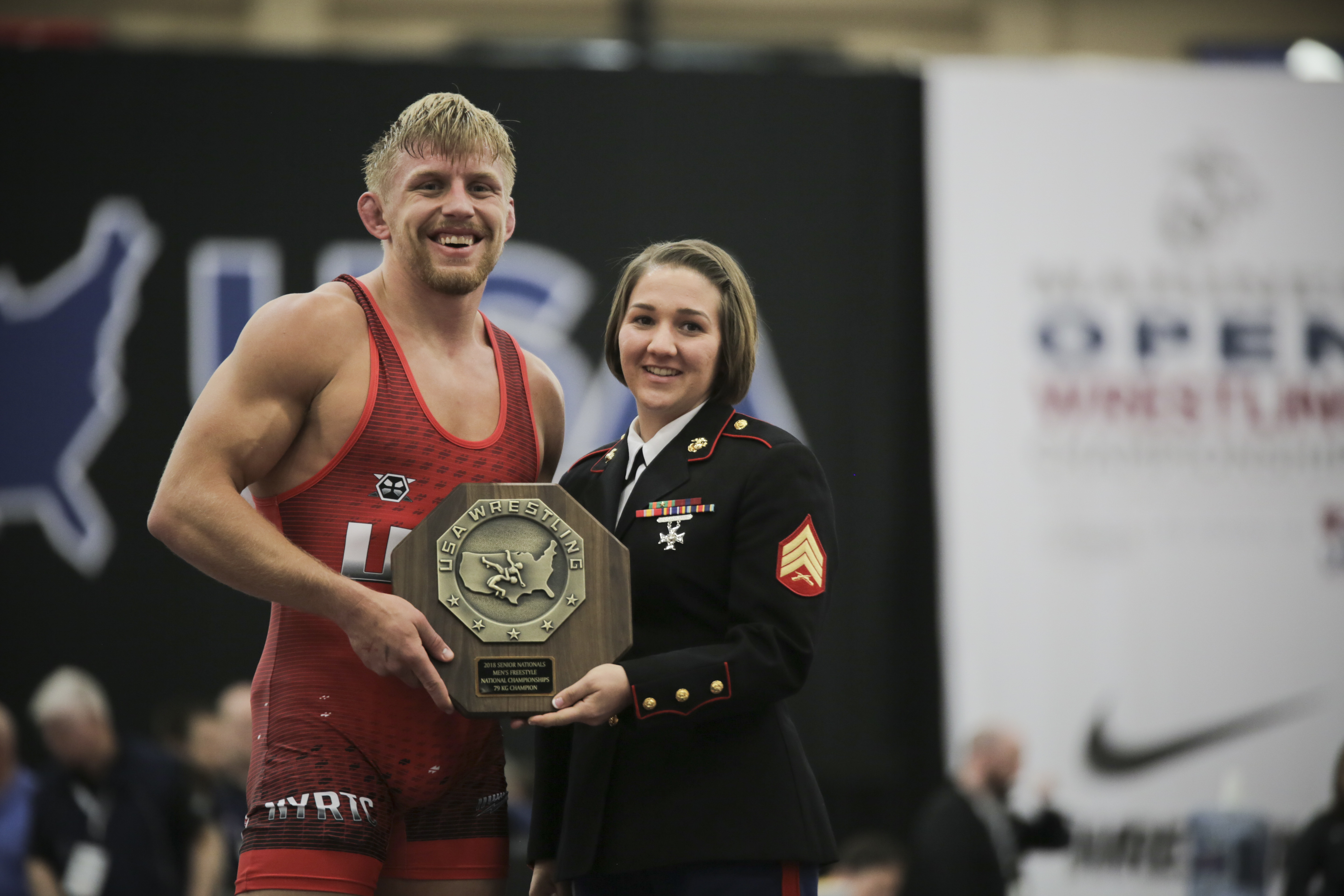
Dake (left) in 2018

In his first appearance of the year, Dake competed at the Golden Grand Prix Ivan Yarygin. After defeating Alan Zaseev and Rashid Kurbanov, he was defeated by Akhmed Gadzhimagomedov, claiming the silver medal. However, he came back to the top of the podium at the World Cup, where he was able to beat Sohsuke Takatani and Tariel Gaprindashvili, before defeating Jabrayil Hasanov en route to a team title. Later in the month, Dake claimed his second US national title, defeating Alex Dieringer in the finale. After defeating Liván López at Beat the Streets, Dake made his first US World Team at Final X: State College, when he defeated Zahid Valencia twice in a row. He then claimed the Yasar Dogu International crown, where he defeated Jabrayil Hasanov, Ayhan Sucu, and Ibrahim Yusubov.

In October, Dake competed at the World Championships for the first time in his career, at age 27. He won every match via technical fall without giving up a point up until the finals, defeating Martin Obst, Davit Khutsishvili and avenging his only loss at the weight class to Akhmed Gadzhimagomedov. In the finale, Dake once again defeated Jabrayil Hasanov, on points, to claim his first World Championship.

==== 2019–2020 ====
The newly crowned World Champion, Dake was unable to defend his US World Team spot in June at Final X: Rutgers against Alex Dieringer, due to surgery, pushing the wrestle–offs for later on. Instead, he came back on July at the Grand Prix of Spain, where after five matches, Dake was victorious and stood on top of the podium. The wrestle–offs for the US World Team spot with Alex Dieringer took place in August, with Dake defeating Dieringer twice to defend the spot. A month later, Dake competed at his second World Championships. After defeating Gadzhi Nabiev and Rashid Kurbanov, he once again defeated Jabrayil Hasanov from Azerbaijan to become a two–time World Champion.

Dake moved back down to 74 kilograms to attempt to represent the United States at the 2020 Summer Olympics. For his first tournament of the year, Dake claimed the Matteo Pellicone Ranking Series championship, defeating Soner Demirtaş in the finale to emerge in the rankings at 74 kg. He was then scheduled to compete at the US Olympic Team Trials in April 4–5, however, the event was postponed along with the Summer Olympics due to the COVID-19 outbreak. Due to the pandemic, Dake was only able to compete one more time in the year, defeating two-time World Champion from Italy Frank Chamizo while headlining FloWrestling: Dake vs. Chamizo in July.

==== 2021 ====
To start off the Olympic year, Dake defeated David McFadden at the SCRTC I on January 8. A week later, he won gold at the Grand Prix de France Henri Deglane. He then defeated Vincenzo Joseph and Jason Nolf. In April, Dake competed at the rescheduled US Olympic Team Trials in April 2–3, without a seed as he would go on to get a berth to the semifinals as a World Champion at a non–Olympic weight. In the challenge bracket, Dake defeated Evan Wick and Jason Nolf to head to the best of three final. Facing former rival and five–time Olympic and World Champion Jordan Burroughs, Dake was able to defeat Burroughs, thus putting an end to his nine year–long reign. After one of the biggest wins of his career, Dake earned the right to represent the United States at the 2020 Summer Olympics. As a result, Dake also competed at the Pan American Continental Championships on May 30. He claimed the crown after racking up 40 points against four opponents and going unscored, helping the USA reach all the 10 freestyle medals.

On August 5, Dake competed at the first date of the men's freestyle 74 kg event of the 2020 Summer Olympics as one of the favorites to claim the gold medal. After a 4–0 victory over Mostafa Hosseinkhani from Iran, Dake was defeated by Magomedkhabib Kadimagomedov from Belarus, losing by technical fall for the first time since 2015 and not being able to score a point on an opponent since 2013, as well as snapping a former 49-match win streak. After the stunning loss, Dake battled and rallied for the bronze medal defeating multiple-time World medalist Geandry Garzón from Cuba and Frank Chamizo from Italy.

As an Olympic medalist, Dake earned the right to automatically represent the United States at the 2021 World Championships without having to compete domestically to make the US World Team, and did so from October 2 to 3. After three victories to make the finals, Dake defeated Tajmuraz Salkazanov from Slovakia to claim his third straight World Championship, and his first at 74 kilograms.

==== 2022 ====
In his first competition of the year, Dake defended his Pan American Championship on May 8, notably beating Franklin Gómez. Exactly a month after, he defeated three-time NCAA champion Jason Nolf twice in a row to defeat his US World Team spot.

On September 17, at the World Championships in Belgrade, Dake won his second straight world championship at 74 kg, and fourth overall. In the finals, Dake defeated Tajmuraz Salkazanov of Slovakia 3–2.

==== 2023 ====
History repeated itself with Dake claiming the Pan American title with a win over Franklin Gómez in the finals in May, and repeating as the US World Team Member in June after defeating Jason Nolf twice in a row at June's Final X NYC.

Hunting for a third-straight World title at 74 kilograms, Dake made the finals of the World Championships with notable wins over eventual World champion Nurkozha Kaipanov from Kazakhstan, eventual Olympic finalist Daichi Takatani from Japan, and another eventual World champion in Georgios Kougioumtsidis from Greece. In a highly anticipated gold-medal bout, Dake fell to three-time World and Olympic champion Zaurbek Sidakov from Russia, seven points to ten.

==== 2024 ====
After adding a fourth Pan American title to his name in February, Dake claimed the right to represent the United States at the 2024 Summer Olympics with two straight wins over Jason Nolf at the US Olympic Team Trials in April.

In August, Dake made his second appearance at the Summer Olympic Games, reaching the semifinals with wins over Venezuela's Anthony Montero and Iran's two-time World medalist Younes Emami. In a 24-point match, Dake fell to Japan's World medalist Daichi Takatani, getting knocked into the third-place match. He was able to clinch the bronze medal for the United States with a win over 2014 World champion from Serbia Khetag Tsabolov.

==== 2025 ====
Dake once again in his career bulked up to 86 kilograms, making his first appearance at April's US Open National Championships, where after a notable win over NCAA champion Parker Keckeisen, he fell to World medalist at 92 kilograms Zahid Valencia to claim silver.

In May, Dake added yet another victory over Parker Keckeisen, before qualifying to Final X by adding five-time NCAA champion Carter Starocci to his resume. At Final X, he was unable to defeat Zahid Valencia in two matches, placing second at the US World Team Trials.

Dake then competed in the first two events for Real American Freestyle, claiming the Cruiserweight title in the first one over NCAA champion Dean Hamiti and retaining it in the second one over two-time World medalist Boris Makoev.

==== 2026 ====
To open up January, Dake scored revenge when he retained his title over Mahamedkhabib Kadzimahamedau at RAF 5, who had denied him a finals appearance at the 2020 Summer Olympics.

In February, Dake placed fifth at the Muhamet Malo Ranking Series, falling to two-time U20 World champion from Russia Ibragim Kadiev and World medalist from Azerbaijan Arsenii Dzhioev.

In March, Dake once again retained his RAF title, now with a third win over Parker Keckeisen. At April's US Open, Dake claimed the gold medal to qualify for Final X in June.

Having set up a best-of-three rematch with now reigning World champion Zahid Valencia, Dake dropped the first match, but was able to outwrestle Valencia in two straight matches to claim the series and make his eighth US World/Olympic team.

== Freestyle record ==
Senior Freestyle Matches
Res.	Record	Opponent	Score	Date	Event	Location
2026 Final X (gold) at 86 kg
Win	155–26	(United States) Zahid Valencia	4–0	June 19, 2026	2026 Final X	(United States) Newark, New Jersey
Win	154–26	(United States) Zahid Valencia	4–1	June 19, 2026	2026 Final X	(United States) Newark, New Jersey
Loss	153–26	(United States) Zahid Valencia	2–3	June 19, 2026	2026 Final X	(United States) Newark, New Jersey
2026 US Open (gold) at 86 kg
Win	153–25	(United States) Parker Keckeisen	8–2	April 24–25, 2026	2026 US Open National Championships	(United States) Las Vegas, Nevada
Win	152–25	(United States) Aeoden Sinclair	6–1	April 24–25, 2026	2026 US Open National Championships	(United States) Las Vegas, Nevada
Win	151–25	(United States) Cade DeVos	3–0	April 24–25, 2026	2026 US Open National Championships	(United States) Las Vegas, Nevada
Win	150–25	(United States) Joshua Cordio	TF 11–0	April 24–25, 2026	2026 US Open National Championships	(United States) Las Vegas, Nevada
Win	149-25	(United States) Parker Keckeisen	7–1	March 28, 2026	RAF 07	(United States) Tampa, Florida
2026 Muhamet Malo Ranking Series 5th at 86 kg
Loss	148-25	(Azerbaijan) Arsenii Dzhioev	1-4	February 25, 2026	2026 Muhamet Malo Tournament	Tirana, Albania
Win	148-24	(Bahrain) Khidir Saipudinov	10-4	February 25, 2026	2026 Muhamet Malo Tournament	Tirana, Albania
Win	147-24	(Puerto Rico) Shane Jones	TF 11-0	February 25, 2026	2026 Muhamet Malo Tournament	Tirana, Albania
Loss	146-24	(Russia) Ibragim Kadiev	4-11	February 25, 2026	2026 Muhamet Malo Tournament	Tirana, Albania
Win	146-23	(Belarus) Magomedkhabib Kadimagomedov	10–7	January 10, 2026	RAF 05	(United States) Sunrise, Florida
Win	145-23	(Slovakia) Boris Makoev	7-1	October 25, 2025	RAF 02	(United States) State College, Pennsylvania
Win	144-23	(United States) Dean Hamiti	TF 11-0	August 30, 2025	RAF 01	(United States) Cleveland, Ohio
2025 US World Team Trials (silver) at 86 kg
Loss	143-23	(United States) Zahid Valencia	1-4	June 14, 2025	2025 Final X	(United States) Newark, New Jersey
Loss	143-22	(United States) Zahid Valencia	3-5	June 14, 2025	2025 Final X	(United States) Newark, New Jersey
Win	143–21	(United States) Carter Starocci	3–3	May 16–17, 2025	2025 US World Team Trials Challenge	(United States) Louisville, Kentucky
Win	142–21	(United States) Parker Keckeisen	TF 11–1	May 16–17, 2025	2025 US World Team Trials Challenge	(United States) Louisville, Kentucky
2025 US Open (silver) at 86 kg
Loss	141–21	(United States) Zahid Valencia	4–8	April 25–26, 2025	2025 US Open National Championships	(United States) Las Vegas, Nevada
Win	141–20	(United States) Parker Keckeisen	8–1	April 25–26, 2025	2025 US Open National Championships	(United States) Las Vegas, Nevada
Win	140–20	(United States) Jersey Robb	TF 12–1	April 25–26, 2025	2025 US Open National Championships	(United States) Las Vegas, Nevada
Win	139–20	(United States) Vladislam Egorov	TF 10–0	April 25–26, 2025	2025 US Open National Championships	(United States) Las Vegas, Nevada
Win	138–20	(United States) Joe Trygstad	TF 10–0	April 25–26, 2025	2025 US Open National Championships	(United States) Las Vegas, Nevada
2024 Summer Olympics (bronze) at 74 kg
Win	137–20	(Serbia) Khetag Tsabolov	10–4	August 10, 2024	2024 Summer Olympics	Paris, France
Loss	136–20	(Japan) Daichi Takatani	12–20	August 9, 2024	2024 Summer Olympics	Paris, France
Win	136–19	(Iran) Younes Emami	Fall	August 9, 2024	2024 Summer Olympics	Paris, France
Win	135–19	(Venezuela) Anthony Montero	TF 10–0	August 9, 2024	2024 Summer Olympics	Paris, France
2024 US Olympic Team Trials (gold) at 74 kg
Win	134–19	(United States) Jason Nolf	3–1	April 20, 2024	2024 US Olympic Team Trials	(United States) State College, Pennsylvania
Win	133–19	(United States) Jason Nolf	4–1	April 20, 2024	2024 US Olympic Team Trials	(United States) State College, Pennsylvania
2024 Pan American Championships (gold) at 74 kg
Win		(Dominican Republic) Julio Rafael Romero	FF	February 23, 2024	2024 Pan American Continental Championships	Acapulco, Mexico
Win	132–19	(Venezuela) Anthony Montero	TF 13–0	February 23, 2024	2024 Pan American Continental Championships	Acapulco, Mexico
Win	131–19	(Panama) Angel Cortes	TF 10–0	February 23, 2024	2024 Pan American Continental Championships	Acapulco, Mexico
2023 World Championships (silver) at 74 kg
Loss	130-19	(Russia) Zaurbek Sidakov	7-10	September 17–18, 2023	2023 World Championships	Belgrade, Serbia
Win	130–18	(Greece) Georgios Kougioumtsidis	4–1	September 17–18, 2023	2023 World Championships	Belgrade, Serbia
Win	129–18	(Japan) Daichi Takatani	6–4	September 17–18, 2023	2023 World Championships	Belgrade, Serbia
Win	128–18	(Kazakhstan) Nurkozha Kaipanov	9–4	September 17–18, 2023	2023 World Championships	Belgrade, Serbia
Win	127–18	(Tajikistan) Magomet Evloev	TF 12–2	September 17–18, 2023	2023 World Championships	Belgrade, Serbia
2023 Final X NYC (gold) at 74 kg
Win	126–18	(United States) Jason Nolf	3-0	June 10, 2023	2023 Final X NYC	(United States) New York City, New York
Win	125–18	(United States) Jason Nolf	6–0	June 10, 2023	2023 Final X NYC	(United States) New York City, New York
2023 Pan American Championships (gold) at 74 kg
Win	124–18	(Puerto Rico) Franklin Gomez	TF 10–0	May 3–6, 2023	2023 Pan American Continental Championships	Buenos Aires, Argentina
Win	123–18	(Cuba) Franklin Maren	TF 10–0	May 3–6, 2023	2023 Pan American Continental Championships	Buenos Aires, Argentina
Win	122–18	(Canada) Adam Thomson	TF 10–0	May 3–6, 2023	2023 Pan American Continental Championships	Buenos Aires, Argentina
Win	121–18	(Venezuela) Mauricio Sanchez	TF 10–0	May 3–6, 2023	2023 Pan American Continental Championships	Buenos Aires, Argentina
2022 World Championships (gold) at 74 kg
Win	120–18	(Slovakia) Tajmuraz Salkazanov	3–2	September 16–17, 2022	2022 World Championships	Belgrade, Serbia
Win	119–18	(Iran) Younes Emami	2–2	September 16–17, 2022	2022 World Championships	Belgrade, Serbia
Win	118–18	(India) Sagar Jaglan	Fall	September 16–17, 2022	2022 World Championships	Belgrade, Serbia
Win	117–18	(Mongolia) Suldkhuu Olonbayar	TF 12–2	September 16–17, 2022	2022 World Championships	Belgrade, Serbia
Win	116–18	(Kyrgyzstan) Islambek Orozbekov	TF 10–0	September 16–17, 2022	2022 World Championships	Belgrade, Serbia
2022 Final X NYC (gold) at 74 kg
Win	115–18	(United States) Jason Nolf	2-1	June 8, 2022	2022 Final X NYC	(United States) New York City, New York
Win	114–18	(United States) Jason Nolf	4–2	June 8, 2022	2022 Final X NYC	(United States) New York City, New York
2022 Pan American Championships (gold) at 74 kg
Win	113–18	(Puerto Rico) Franklin Gomez	10–1	May 8, 2022	2022 Pan American Continental Championships	Acapulco, Mexico
Win	112–18	(Cuba) Frank Maren	TF 10–0	May 8, 2022	2022 Pan American Continental Championships	Acapulco, Mexico
Win	111–18	(Mexico) Diego Santival	TF 12–1	May 8, 2022	2022 Pan American Continental Championships	Acapulco, Mexico
2021 World Championships (gold) at 74 kg
Win	110–18	(Slovakia) Tajmuraz Salkazanov	7–3	October 3, 2021	2021 World Championships	Oslo, Norway
Win	109–18	(Belarus) Azamat Nurykau	9–1	October 2, 2021	2021 World Championships	Oslo, Norway
Win	108–18	(Turkey) Fazlı Eryılmaz	5–0	October 2, 2021	2021 World Championships	Oslo, Norway
Win	107–18	(Moldova) Vasile Diacon	TF 11–0	October 2, 2021	2021 World Championships	Oslo, Norway
2020 Summer Olympics (bronze) at 74 kg
Win	106–18	(Italy) Frank Chamizo	5–0	August 6, 2021	2020 Summer Olympics	Tokyo, Japan
Win	105–18	(Cuba) Geandry Garzón	TF 10–0	August 6, 2021	2020 Summer Olympics	Tokyo, Japan
Loss	104–18	(Belarus) Magomedkhabib Kadimagomedov	TF 0–11	August 5, 2021	2020 Summer Olympics	Tokyo, Japan
Win	104–17	(Iran) Mostafa Hosseinkhani	4–0	August 5, 2021	2020 Summer Olympics	Tokyo, Japan
2021 Pan American Championships (gold) at 74 kg
Win	103–17	(Mexico) Víctor Eduardo Hernández	TF 10–0	May 30, 2021	2021 Pan American Continental Championships	Guatemala City, Guatemala
Win	102–17	(Canada) Jasmit Singh Phulka	TF 10–0	May 30, 2021	2021 Pan American Continental Championships	Guatemala City, Guatemala
Win	101–17	(Brazil) Renato Patricio Da Silva	TF 10–0	May 30, 2021	2021 Pan American Continental Championships	Guatemala City, Guatemala
Win	100–17	(Dominican Republic) Julio Rodríguez	TF 10–0	May 30, 2021	2021 Pan American Continental Championships	Guatemala City, Guatemala
2020 US Olympic Team Trials (gold) at 74 kg
Win	99–17	(United States) Jordan Burroughs	3–2	April 3, 2021	2020 US Olympic Team Trials	(United States) Fort Worth, Texas
Win	98–17	(United States) Jordan Burroughs	3–0	April 3, 2021	2020 US Olympic Team Trials	(United States) Fort Worth, Texas
Win	97–17	(United States) Jason Nolf	TF 11–0	April 2, 2021	2020 US Olympic Team Trials	(United States) Fort Worth, Texas
Win	96–17	(United States) Evan Wick	TF 10–0	April 2, 2021	2020 US Olympic Team Trials	(United States) Fort Worth, Texas
Win	95–17	(United States) Jason Nolf	5–0	February 23, 2021	NLWC V	(United States) State College, Pennsylvania
Win	94–17	(United States) Vincenzo Joseph	TF 10–0	February 23, 2021	NLWC V	(United States) State College, Pennsylvania
2021 Henri Deglane Grand Prix (gold) at 74 kg
Win	93–17	(Azerbaijan) Khadzhimurad Gadzhiyev	Fall	January 16, 2021	Grand Prix de France Henri Deglane 2021	Nice, France
Win	92–17	(Israel) Mitch Finesilver	TF 11–0	January 16, 2021	Grand Prix de France Henri Deglane 2021	Nice, France
Win	91–17	(Spain) Jonathan Alvarez	TF 11–0	January 16, 2021	Grand Prix de France Henri Deglane 2021	Nice, France
Win	90–17	(United States) David McFadden	TF 11–0	January 8, 2021	SCRTC I	(United States) Austin, Texas
Win	89–17	(Italy) Frank Chamizo	4–3	July 25, 2020	FloWrestling: Dake vs. Chamizo	(United States) Austin, Texas
2020 Matteo Pellicone Ranking Series (gold) at 74 kg
Win	88–17	(Turkey) Soner Demirtaş	TF 11–0	January 15–18, 2020	Matteo Pellicone Ranking Series 2020	Rome, Italy
Win	87–17	(Turkey) Fazlı Eryılmaz	3–1	January 15–18, 2020	Matteo Pellicone Ranking Series 2020	Rome, Italy
Win	86–17	(Hungary) Murad Kuramagomedov	TF 10–0	January 15–18, 2020	Matteo Pellicone Ranking Series 2020	Rome, Italy
Win	85–17	(Belarus) Azamat Nurykau	5–1	January 15–18, 2020	Matteo Pellicone Ranking Series 2020	Rome, Italy
2019 World Championships (gold) at 79 kg
Win	84–17	(Azerbaijan) Jabrayil Hasanov	4–2	September 14–22, 2019	2019 World Championships	Nur-Sultan, Kazakhstan
Win	83–17	(Uzbekistan) Rashid Kurbanov	6–1	September 14–22, 2019	2019 World Championships	Nur-Sultan, Kazakhstan
Win	82–17	(Russia) Gadzhi Nabiev	5–1	September 14–22, 2019	2019 World Championships	Nur-Sultan, Kazakhstan
Win	81–17	(Kyrgyzstan) Oibek Nasirov	TF 12–2	September 14–22, 2019	2019 World Championships	Nur-Sultan, Kazakhstan
2019 US World Team Trials (gold) at 79 kg
Win	80–17	(United States) Alex Dieringer	4–2	August 17, 2019	2019 Final X Special Wrestle-off: Dake vs. Dieringer	(United States) Austin, Texas
Win	79–17	(United States) Alex Dieringer	3–2	August 17, 2019	2019 Final X Special Wrestle-off: Dake vs. Dieringer	(United States) Austin, Texas
2019 Spain Grand Prix (gold) at 79 kg
Win	78–17	(Turkmenistan) Döwletmyrat Orazgylyjow	5–0	July 5–7, 2019	2019 Grand Prix of Spain	Madrid, Spain
Win	77–17	(Canada) Max Budgey	TF 12–2	July 5–7, 2019	2019 Grand Prix of Spain	Madrid, Spain
Win	76–17	(Russia) Sarmat Tsarakhov	TF 12–0	July 5–7, 2019	2019 Grand Prix of Spain	Madrid, Spain
Win	75–17	(Spain) Carlos Gilabert	TF 10–0	July 5–7, 2019	2019 Grand Prix of Spain	Madrid, Spain
Win	74–17	(Turkmenistan) Döwletmyrat Orazgylyjow	7–5	July 5–7, 2019	2019 Grand Prix of Spain	Madrid, Spain
2018 World Championships (gold) at 79 kg
Win	73–17	(Azerbaijan) Jabrayil Hasanov	2–0	October 20–28, 2018	2018 World Championships	Budapest, Hungary
Win	72–17	(Russia) Akhmed Gadzhimagomedov	TF 13–0	October 20–28, 2018	2018 World Championships	Budapest, Hungary
Win	71–17	(Georgia (country)) Davit Khutsishvili	TF 11–0	October 20–28, 2018	2018 World Championships	Budapest, Hungary
Win	70–17	(Germany) Martin Obst	TF 11–0	October 20–28, 2018	2018 World Championships	Budapest, Hungary
2018 Yasar Dogu (gold) at 79 kg
Win	69–17	(Azerbaijan) Ibrahim Yusubov	TF 11–0	July 27–29, 2018	2018 Yasar Dogu Ranking Series	Istanbul, Turkey
Win	68–17	(Turkey) Ayhan Sucu	Fall	July 27–29, 2018	2018 Yasar Dogu Ranking Series	Istanbul, Turkey
Win	67–17	(Azerbaijan) Jabrayil Hasanov	Fall	July 27–29, 2018	2018 Yasar Dogu Ranking Series	Istanbul, Turkey
2018 US World Team Trials (gold) at 79kg
Win	66–17	(United States) Zahid Valencia	4–3	June 15–16, 2018	2018 Final X: State College	(United States) State College, Pennsylvania
Win	65–17	(United States) Zahid Valencia	4–0	June 15–16, 2018	2018 Final X: State College	(United States) State College, Pennsylvania
Win	64–17	(Cuba) Liván López	TF 13–1	May 17, 2018	2018 Beat The Streets: Team USA vs. The World All-Stars	(United States) New York City, New York
2018 US Open (gold) at 79 kg
Win	63–17	(United States) Alex Dieringer	5–5	April 24–28, 2018	2018 US Open National Championships	(United States) Las Vegas, Nevada
Win	62–17	(United States) Josh Asper	TF 11–0	April 24–28, 2018	2018 US Open National Championships	(United States) Las Vegas, Nevada
Win	61–17	(United States) Stacey Davis	TF 10–0	April 24–28, 2018	2018 US Open National Championships	(United States) Las Vegas, Nevada
Win	60–17	(United States) Ryan Christensen	TF 10–0	April 24–28, 2018	2018 US Open National Championships	(United States) Las Vegas, Nevada
2018 World Cup (gold) at 79 kg
Win	59–17	(Azerbaijan) Jabrayil Hasanov	5–3	April 7–8, 2018	2018 World Cup	(United States) Iowa City, Iowa
Win	58–17	(Georgia (country)) Tariel Gaprindashvili	TF 10–0	April 7–8, 2018	2018 World Cup	(United States) Iowa City, Iowa
Win	57–17	(Japan) Sohsuke Takatani	TF 10–0	April 7–8, 2018	2018 World Cup	(United States) Iowa City, Iowa
Win	56–17	(India) Sachin Giri	TF 11–0	April 7–8, 2018	2018 World Cup	(United States) Iowa City, Iowa
2018 Ivan Yarygin Golden Grand Prix (silver) at 79 kg
Loss	55–17	(Dagestan) Akhmed Gadzhimagomedov	1–8	January 26–28, 2018	2018 Ivan Yarygin Golden Grand Prix	Krasnoyarsk, Russia
Win	55–16	(Uzbekistan) Rashid Kurbanov	TF 10–0	January 26–28, 2018	2018 Ivan Yarygin Golden Grand Prix	Krasnoyarsk, Russia
Win	54–16	(North Ossetia–Alania) Alan Zaseev	9–7	January 26–28, 2018	2018 Ivan Yarygin Golden Grand Prix	Krasnoyarsk, Russia
2017 World Clubs Cup (silver) as TMWC at 79 kg
Win	53–16	(Canada) Ahmed Shamiya	TF 11–0	December 7–8, 2017	2017 World Wrestling Clubs Cup	Tehran, Iran
Win	52–16	(India) Jitender	TF 10–0	December 7–8, 2017	2017 World Wrestling Clubs Cup	Tehran, Iran
Win	51–16	(Bulgaria) Hasan Molla	TF 10–0	December 7–8, 2017	2017 World Wrestling Clubs Cup	Tehran, Iran
Win	50–16	(Mongolia) Ganbold Turbold	TF 10–0	December 7–8, 2017	2017 World Wrestling Clubs Cup	Tehran, Iran
Win	49–16	(Iran) Reza Afzali	TF 12–0	December 7–8, 2017	2017 World Wrestling Clubs Cup	Tehran, Iran
2017 US World Team Trials (silver) at 74 kg
Loss	48–16	(United States) Jordan Burroughs	2–6	June 9–10, 2017	2017 US World Team Trials	(United States) Lincoln, Nebraska
Loss	48–15	(United States) Jordan Burroughs	4–8	June 9–10, 2017	2017 US World Team Trials	(United States) Lincoln, Nebraska
Win	48–14	(United States) Jordan Burroughs	6–6	June 9–10, 2017	2017 US World Team Trials	(United States) Lincoln, Nebraska
Win	47–14	(United States) Alex Dieringer	2–1	June 9–10, 2017	2017 US World Team Trials Challenge Tournament	(United States) Lincoln, Nebraska
Win	46–14	(United States) Isaiah Martinez	9–2	June 9–10, 2017	2017 US World Team Trials Challenge Tournament	(United States) Lincoln, Nebraska
2017 US Open (silver) at 74 kg
Loss	45–14	(United States) Jordan Burroughs	2–2	April 26–29, 2017	2017 US Open National Championships	(United States) Las Vegas, Nevada
Win	45–13	(United States) Alex Dieringer	3–0	April 26–29, 2017	2017 US Open National Championships	(United States) Las Vegas, Nevada
Win	44–13	(United States) Vladyslav Dombrovskiy	TF 11–0	April 26–29, 2017	2017 US Open National Championships	(United States) Las Vegas, Nevada
Win	43–13	(United States) Tyrel White	TF 10–0	April 26–29, 2017	2017 US Open National Championships	(United States) Las Vegas, Nevada
2017 Paris Grand Prix (gold) at 74 kg
Win	42–13	(United States) Alex Dieringer	TF 10–0	January 28–29, 2017	2017 International Paris Grand Prix	Paris, France
Win	41–13	(United States) Dan Valimont	TF 11–0	January 28–29, 2017	2017 International Paris Grand Prix	Paris, France
Win	40–13	(Georgia (country)) Davit Tlashadze	TF 14–4	January 28–29, 2017	2017 International Paris Grand Prix	Paris, France
Win	39–13	(United States) Matt Brown	TF 10–0	January 28–29, 2017	2017 International Paris Grand Prix	Paris, France
2016 US Olympic Team Trials (silver) at 86 kg
Loss	38–13	(United States) J'den Cox	3–5	April 9–10, 2016	2016 US Olympic Team Trials	(United States) Iowa City, Iowa
Win	38–12	(United States) J'den Cox	5–3	April 9–10, 2016	2016 US Olympic Team Trials	(United States) Iowa City, Iowa
Loss	37–12	(United States) J'den Cox	1–8	April 9–10, 2016	2016 US Olympic Team Trials	(United States) Iowa City, Iowa
Win	37–11	(United States) David Taylor	4–3	April 9–10, 2016	2016 US Olympic Team Trials	(United States) Iowa City, Iowa
Win	36–11	(United States) Richard Perry	10–7	April 9–10, 2016	2016 US Olympic Team Trials	(United States) Iowa City, Iowa
2016 Medved International 9th at 86kg
Loss	35–11	(Belarus) Amarhajy Mahamedau	1–9	February 18–19, 2016	2016 Alexander Medved Prizes Ranking Series	Minsk, Belarus
Win	35–10	(Georgia (country)) Irakli Mtsituri	6–1	February 18–19, 2016	2016 Alexander Medved Prizes Ranking Series	Minsk, Belarus
Win	34–10	(Poland) Sebastian Jezierzański	TF 13–2	February 18–19, 2016	2016 Alexander Medved Prizes Ranking Series	Minsk, Belarus
2015 US Nationals (gold) at 86 kg
Win	33–10	(United States) David Taylor	11–4	December 17–19, 2015	2015 Senior Nationals - US Olympic Trials Qualifier	(United States) Las Vegas, Nevada
Win	32–10	(United States) Jon Reader	6–4	December 17–19, 2015	2015 Senior Nationals - US Olympic Trials Qualifier	(United States) Las Vegas, Nevada
Win	31–10	(United States) Keith Gavin	6–2	December 17–19, 2015	2015 Senior Nationals - US Olympic Trials Qualifier	(United States) Las Vegas, Nevada
Win	30–10	(United States) Tyrel Todd	Fall	December 17–19, 2015	2015 Senior Nationals - US Olympic Trials Qualifier	(United States) Las Vegas, Nevada
2015 US World Team Trials (silver) at 74 kg
Loss	29–10	(United States) Jordan Burroughs	TF 4–14	June 12–14, 2015	2015 US World Team Trials	(United States) Madison, Wisconsin
Loss	29–9	(United States) Jordan Burroughs	3–6	June 12–14, 2015	2015 US World Team Trials	(United States) Madison, Wisconsin
Win	29–8	(United States) David Taylor	8–2	June 12–14, 2015	2015 US World Team Trials Challenge Tournament	(United States) Madison, Wisconsin
Win	28–8	(United States) Andrew Howe	3–1	June 12–14, 2015	2015 US World Team Trials Challenge Tournament	(United States) Madison, Wisconsin
Win	27–8	(United States) Colton Sponseller	TF 10–0	June 12–14, 2015	2015 US World Team Trials Challenge Tournament	(United States) Madison, Wisconsin
2015 Phil Portuese NE Regional (gold) at 74 kg
Win	26–8	(United States) Mason Manville	TF 11–0	May 1–3, 2015	2015 Phil Portuese Northeastern Regionals	(United States) East Stroudsburg, Pennsylvania
Win	25–8	(United States) Theodre King	TF 10–0	May 1–3, 2015	2015 Phil Portuese Northeastern Regionals	(United States) East Stroudsburg, Pennsylvania
Win	24–8	(Colombia) Nestor Taffur	TF 12–2	May 1–3, 2015	2015 Phil Portuese Northeastern Regionals	(United States) East Stroudsburg, Pennsylvania
Win	23–8	(United States) Nate Russell	TF 10–0	May 1–3, 2015	2015 Phil Portuese Northeastern Regionals	(United States) East Stroudsburg, Pennsylvania
Win	22–8	(United States) Andrew Howe	2–0	November 22, 2014	2014 Global Wrestling Championships I	(United States) Ithaca, New York
2014 Granma Cup (gold) at 74 kg
Win	21–8	(Cuba) Luis Quintana	4–0	February 11–15, 2014	2014 Granma & Cerro Pelado International	Havana, Cuba
Win	20–8	(Canada) Cleopas Ncube	TF 10–0	February 11–15, 2014	2014 Granma & Cerro Pelado International	Havana, Cuba
Win	19–8	(Canada) Ryan Lue	TF 12–2	February 11–15, 2014	2014 Granma & Cerro Pelado International	Havana, Cuba
2013 Heydar Aliyev Golden Grand Prix 5th at 74 kg
Loss	18–8	(Azerbaijan) Ashraf Aliyev	3–3	November 22–24, 2013	2013 Heydar Aliyev Golden Grand Prix	Baku, Azerbaijan
Loss	18–7	(Russia) Gadzhi Gadzhiev	1–7	November 22–24, 2013	2013 Heydar Aliyev Golden Grand Prix	Baku, Azerbaijan
Win	18–6	(Russia) Denis Tsargush	10–5	November 22–24, 2013	2013 Heydar Aliyev Golden Grand Prix	Baku, Azerbaijan
Win	17–6	(Belarus) Ali Shabanau	7–1	November 22–24, 2013	2013 Heydar Aliyev Golden Grand Prix	Baku, Azerbaijan
2013 US World Team Trials (silver) at 74 kg
Loss	16–6	(United States) Jordan Burroughs	OT 6–9	June 20–22, 2013	2013 US World Team Trials	(United States) Stillwater, Oklahoma
Loss	16–5	(United States) Jordan Burroughs	TF 0–7	June 20–22, 2013	2013 US World Team Trials	(United States) Stillwater, Oklahoma
Win	16–4	(United States) Andrew Howe	OT 4–2	June 20–22, 2013	2013 US World Team Trials Challenge Tournament	(United States) Stillwater, Oklahoma
Win	15–4	(United States) David Taylor	7–4	June 20–22, 2013	2013 US World Team Trials Challenge Tournament	(United States) Stillwater, Oklahoma
Win	14–4	(United States) Trent Paulson	TF 8–1	June 20–22, 2013	2013 US World Team Trials Challenge Tournament	(United States) Stillwater, Oklahoma
Win	13–4	(Iran) Hassan Tahmasebi	2–0, 1–0	May 15, 2013	2013 Beat The Streets: Rumble on the Rails	(United States) New York City, New York
2012 US Olympic Team Trials 4th at 74 kg
Win	12–4	(United States) Nick Marable	3–0, 1–1	April 21–22, 2012	2012 US Olympic Team Trials	(United States) Iowa City, Iowa
Win	11–4	(United States) David Taylor	Fall	April 21–22, 2012	2012 US Olympic Team Trials	(United States) Iowa City, Iowa
Loss	10–4	(United States) Trent Paulson	0–2, 1–0, 0–6	April 21–22, 2012	2012 US Olympic Team Trials	(United States) Iowa City, Iowa
Win	10–3	(United States) Nick Marable	0–1, 1–0, 1–0	April 21–22, 2012	2012 US Olympic Team Trials	(United States) Iowa City, Iowa
Win	9–3	(United States) Colt Sponseller	2–0, 1–0	April 21–22, 2012	2012 US Olympic Team Trials	(United States) Iowa City, Iowa
2011 US World Team Trials DNP at 74 kg
Loss	8–3	(United States) Kirk White	3–0, 0–1, 0–1	June 9–11, 2011	2011 US World Team Trials Challenge	(United States) Oklahoma City, Oklahoma
Win	8–2	(United States) Tyler Caldwell	3–0, 2–4, 4–3	June 9–11, 2011	2011 US World Team Trials Challenge	(United States) Oklahoma City, Oklahoma
Win	7–2	(United States) Moza Fay	2–0, 5–0	June 9–11, 2011	2011 US World Team Trials Challenge	(United States) Oklahoma City, Oklahoma
Loss	6–2	(United States) Nick Marable	3–3, 0–3, 0–1	June 9–11, 2011	2011 US World Team Trials Challenge	(United States) Oklahoma City, Oklahoma
Win	6–1	(United States) J.P. O`Connor	0–1, 2–1, 1–0	June 9–11, 2011	2011 US World Team Trials Challenge	(United States) Oklahoma City, Oklahoma
2011 US University Nationals (silver) at 74 kg
Loss	5–1	(United States) Andrew Howe	1–3, 2–1, 0–1	April 20–23, 2011	2011 US University National Championships	(United States) Akron, Ohio
Win	5–0	(United States) Nick Sulzer	3–1, 3–1	April 20–23, 2011	2011 US University National Championships	(United States) Akron, Ohio
Win	4–0	(United States) Dirk Cowburn	2–0, 1–0	April 20–23, 2011	2011 US University National Championships	(United States) Akron, Ohio
Win	3–0	(United States) Corey Lear	7–0, 3–1	April 20–23, 2011	2011 US University National Championships	(United States) Akron, Ohio
Win	2–0	(United States) Taylor Smith	TF 7–0, 6–0	April 20–23, 2011	2011 US University National Championships	(United States) Akron, Ohio
Win	1–0	(United States) Brandon Guthrie	TF 5–0, 7–0	April 20–23, 2011	2011 US University National Championships	(United States) Akron, Ohio

== NCAA record ==
NCAA Championships Matches
Res.	Record	Opponent	Score	Date	Event
2013 NCAA Championships (gold) at 165 lbs
Win	20–0	David Taylor	5–4	March 21–23, 2013	2013 NCAA Division I National Championships
Win	19–0	Tyler Caldwell	2–0	March 21–23, 2013	2013 NCAA Division I National Championships
Win	18–0	Nick Sulzer	MD 13–0	March 21–23, 2013	2013 NCAA Division I National Championships
Win	17–0	Ryan Leblanc	MD 10–0	March 21–23, 2013	2013 NCAA Division I National Championships
Win	16–0	Mark Martin	3–0	March 21–23, 2013	2013 NCAA Division I National Championships
2012 NCAA Championships (gold) at 157 lbs
Win	15–0	Derek St. John	4–1	March 15–17, 2012	2012 NCAA Division I National Championships
Win	14–0	Ganbayar Sanjaa	4–0	March 15–17, 2012	2012 NCAA Division I National Championships
Win	13–0	Frank Hickman	Fall	March 15–17, 2012	2012 NCAA Division I National Championships
Win	12–0	Josh Kreimier	Fall	March 15–17, 2012	2012 NCAA Division I National Championships
Win	11–0	John Nicholson	Fall	March 15–17, 2012	2012 NCAA Division I National Championships
2011 NCAA Championships (gold) at 149 lbs
Win	10–0	Frank Molinaro	8–1	March 17–19, 2011	2011 NCAA Division I National Championships
Win	9–0	Ganbayar Sanjaa	4–0	March 17–19, 2011	2011 NCAA Division I National Championships
Win	8–0	Jamal Parks	3–0	March 17–19, 2011	2011 NCAA Division I National Championships
Win	7–0	Torsten Gillespie	MD 8–0	March 17–19, 2011	2011 NCAA Division I National Championships
Win	6–0	Donnie Corby	MD 9-0	March 17–19, 2011	2011 NCAA Division I National Championships
2010 NCAA Championships (gold) at 141 lbs
Win	5–0	Montell Marion	7–3	March 18–20, 2010	2010 NCAA Division I National Championships
Win	4–0	Reece Humphrey	TB 3–2	March 18–20, 2010	2010 NCAA Division I National Championships
Win	3–0	Levi Jones	MD 11–0	March 18–20, 2010	2010 NCAA Division I National Championships
Win	2–0	Elijah Nacita	Fall	March 18–20, 2010	2010 NCAA Division I National Championships
Win	1–0	Todd Schavrien	4–0	March 18–20, 2010	2010 NCAA Division I National Championships
