= 2018 World Wrestling Championships – Men's freestyle 79 kg =

Men's freestyle 79 kg at the 2018 World Championships
- Venue: László Papp Budapest Sports Arena
- Dates: 21–22 October 2018
- Competitors: 26 from 26 nations

Medalists
gold medal	Kyle Dake	United States
silver medal	Jabrayil Hasanov	Azerbaijan
bronze medal	Akhmed Gadzhimagomedov	Russia
bronze medal	Ali Shabanau	Belarus

The men's freestyle 79 kilograms is a competition featured at the 2018 World Wrestling Championships, and was held in Budapest, Hungary on 21 and 22 October.

This freestyle wrestling competition consists of a single-elimination tournament, with a repechage used to determine the winner of two bronze medals. The two finalists face off for gold and silver medals. Each wrestler who loses to one of the two finalists moves into the repechage, culminating in a pair of bronze medal matches featuring the semifinal losers each facing the remaining repechage opponent from their half of the bracket.

Kyle Dake from the United States won the gold medal.

== Results ==
Legend

- F — Won by fall

=== Final ===
Final
Kyle Dake (USA)	2
Jabrayil Hasanov (AZE)	0

=== Top half ===
Round of 32
Pürevjavyn Önörbat (MGL)	13
Sachin Rathi (IND)	1
Rustam Dudaiev (UKR)	1
Ayhan Sucu (TUR)	6
Francisco Kadima (ANG)	0
Davit Khutsishvili (GEO)	12
Martin Obst (GER)	2
Jasmit Phulka (CAN)	1

Round of 16
Akhmed Gadzhimagomedov (RUS)	11
Bakhtiyar Izbassarov (KAZ)	2
Oh Man-ho (KOR)	0
Pürevjavyn Önörbat (MGL)	7
Ayhan Sucu (TUR)	0
Davit Khutsishvili (GEO)	5
Martin Obst (GER)	0
Kyle Dake (USA)	11

Quarterfinals
Akhmed Gadzhimagomedov (RUS)	6
Pürevjavyn Önörbat (MGL)	0
Davit Khutsishvili (GEO)	0
Kyle Dake (USA)	11

Semifinals
Akhmed Gadzhimagomedov (RUS)	0
Kyle Dake (USA)	13

=== Bottom half ===
Round of 32
Omaraskhab Nazhmudinov (ROU)	7
Grigor Grigoryan (ARM)	10
Johnny Bur (FRA)	2
Ezzatollah Akbari (IRI)	10
Mihály Nagy (HUN)	0
Sosuke Takatani (JPN)	9
Santiago Martínez (COL)	0
Ali Shabanau (BLR)	10
Cédric Nimpagaritse (BDI)	0
Döwletmyrat Orazgylyjow (TKM)	4^{F}
Amirkhan Visalimov (AUT)	1
Ethan Ramos (PUR)	12

Round of 16
Rashid Kurbanov (UZB)	2
Grigor Grigoryan (ARM)	9
Ezzatollah Akbari (IRI)	3
Sosuke Takatani (JPN)	2
Ali Shabanau (BLR)	8
Döwletmyrat Orazgylyjow (TKM)	0
Ethan Ramos (PUR)	5
Jabrayil Hasanov (AZE)	14

Quarterfinals
Grigor Grigoryan (ARM)	4
Ezzatollah Akbari (IRI)	7
Ali Shabanau (BLR)	2
Jabrayil Hasanov (AZE)	6

Semifinals
Ezzatollah Akbari (IRI)	3
Jabrayil Hasanov (AZE)	3

=== Repechage ===
Repechage round 2
Martin Obst (GER)	0
Davit Khutsishvili (GEO)	10
Ethan Ramos (PUR)	12
Ali Shabanau (BLR)	16

Bronze medals
Davit Khutsishvili (GEO)	0
Akhmed Gadzhimagomedov (RUS)	10
Ali Shabanau (BLR)	8
Ezzatollah Akbari (IRI)	8
