= 2013 World Wrestling Championships – Men's freestyle 74 kg =

Men's freestyle 74 kg at the 2013 World Championships
- Venue: László Papp Budapest Sports Arena
- Dates: 18 September 2013
- Competitors: 39 from 39 nations

Medalists
gold medal	Jordan Burroughs	United States
silver medal	Ezzatollah Akbari	Iran
bronze medal	Ali Shabanau	Belarus
bronze medal	Rashid Kurbanov	Uzbekistan

The men's freestyle 74 kilograms is a competition featured at the 2013 World Wrestling Championships, and was held at the László Papp Budapest Sports Arena in Budapest, Hungary on 18 September 2013.

== Results ==
Legend

- C — Won by 3 cautions given to the opponent

=== Finals ===
Semifinals		Final
Jordan Burroughs (USA)	7^{C}
Ali Shabanau (BLR)	1	Jordan Burroughs (USA)	4
Rashid Kurbanov (UZB)	3	Ezzatollah Akbari (IRI)	0
Ezzatollah Akbari (IRI)	4

=== Top half ===
==== Section 1 ====
Round of 64

Round of 32
Batchuluuny Ankhbayar (MGL)	0
Jabrayil Hasanov (AZE)	7
Kiril Terziev (BUL)	4
Luca Lampis (FRA)	5
Kakhaber Khubezhty (RUS)	2
Narsingh Yadav (IND)	10
Gamid Dzhalilov (TJK)	2
Jordan Burroughs (USA)	9

Round of 16
Jabrayil Hasanov (AZE)	10
Luca Lampis (FRA)	2
Narsingh Yadav (IND)	0
Jordan Burroughs (USA)	7

Quarterfinals
Jabrayil Hasanov (AZE)	0
Jordan Burroughs (USA)	7

==== Section 2 ====
Round of 64

Round of 32
Andriy Shyyka (GER)	4
Soner Demirtaş (TUR)	7
Georg Marchl (AUT)	0
Ali Shabanau (BLR)	8
Billy Valdez (DOM)	7
Pedro Martínez (GUA)	9
Grigor Grigoryan (ARM)	7
Todisoa Ratolojanahary (MAD)	0

Round of 16
Soner Demirtaş (TUR)	2
Ali Shabanau (BLR)	6
Pedro Martínez (GUA)	0
Grigor Grigoryan (ARM)	8

Quarterfinals
Ali Shabanau (BLR)	9
Grigor Grigoryan (ARM)	1

=== Bottom half ===
==== Section 3 ====
Round of 64

Round of 32
Georgios Savvoulidis (GRE)	0
Gábor Hatos (HUN)	7
Cấn Tất Dự (VIE)	0
Zhang Chongyao (CHN)	7
Abdou Omar (EGY)	0
Lee Yun-seok (KOR)	7
Zaur Efendiev (SRB)	0
Rashid Kurbanov (UZB)	8

Round of 16
Gábor Hatos (HUN)	5
Zhang Chongyao (CHN)	1
Lee Yun-seok (KOR)	2
Rashid Kurbanov (UZB)	5

Quarterfinals
Gábor Hatos (HUN)	2
Rashid Kurbanov (UZB)	3

==== Section 4 ====
Round of 64
Ishan Abeyrathna (SRI)	0
Giya Chykhladze (UKR)	7
Quintino Intipe (GBS)	7
Clinton Davies (NZL)	0
Krystian Brzozowski (POL)	4
Akzhurek Tanatarov (KAZ)	5
Yunierki Blanco (CUB)	8
Jayden Lawrence (AUS)	0
Innokenti Innokentev (KGZ)	8
Dan Pálinkás (SVK)	0
Evan MacDonald (CAN)	5
Jakob Makarashvili (GEO)	8
Alexandru Burcă (MDA)	2
Ezzatollah Akbari (IRI)	10

Round of 32
Sosuke Takatani (JPN)	10
Giya Chykhladze (UKR)	2
Quintino Intipe (GBS)	2
Akzhurek Tanatarov (KAZ)	9
Yunierki Blanco (CUB)	4
Innokenti Innokentev (KGZ)	2
Jakob Makarashvili (GEO)	0
Ezzatollah Akbari (IRI)	7

Round of 16
Sosuke Takatani (JPN)	9
Akzhurek Tanatarov (KAZ)	4
Yunierki Blanco (CUB)	2
Ezzatollah Akbari (IRI)	5

Quarterfinals
Sosuke Takatani (JPN)	4
Ezzatollah Akbari (IRI)	6

=== Repechage ===
Repechage round 1
Alexandru Burcă (MDA)	0
Jakob Makarashvili (GEO)	8

Repechage round 2
Gamid Dzhalilov (TJK)	0
Narsingh Yadav (IND)	7
Jakob Makarashvili (GEO)	2
Yunierki Blanco (CUB)	2

Repechage round 3
Narsingh Yadav (IND)	13
Jabrayil Hasanov (AZE)	4
Jakob Makarashvili (GEO)	6
Sosuke Takatani (JPN)	4

Bronze medals
Narsingh Yadav (IND)	1
Ali Shabanau (BLR)	6
Jakob Makarashvili (GEO)	4
Rashid Kurbanov (UZB)	11
