= 2018 European Wrestling Championships – Men's freestyle 79 kg =

Amateur wrestling competition in Russia

The men's freestyle 79 kg is a competition featured at the 2018 European Wrestling Championships, and was held in Kaspiysk, Russia on May 4 and May 5.

== Medalists ==
Gold	Akhmed Gadzhimagomedov; Russia
Silver	Martin Obst; Germany
Bronze	Mihály Nagy; Hungary
Bronze	Jabrayil Hasanov; Azerbaijan

== Results ==
Legend

- F — Won by fall

=== Main Bracket ===
1/8 finals
Jumber Kvelashvili (GEO)	0
Ali Shabanau (BLR)	6
Alans Amirovs (LAT)	10
Jevgeni Soltruk (EST)	14
Martin Obst (GER)	7
Alexandru Burcă (MDA)	0
Johnny Bur (FRA)	10
Gkeorgki Meletov (GRE)	8
Akhmed Gadzhimagomedov (RUS)	9
Muhammet Nuri Kotanoğlu (TUR)	3
Varuzhan Kajoyan (ARM)	10
Henri Selenius (FIN)	0
Jabrayil Hasanov (AZE)	8
Rustam Dudaiev (UKR)	3

Quarterfinals
Mihály Nagy (HUN)	2
Ali Shabanau (BLR)	2
Jevgeni Soltruk (EST)	0
Martin Obst (GER)	10
Johnny Bur (FRA)	4
Akhmed Gadzhimagomedov (RUS)	4
Varuzhan Kajoyan (ARM)	1
Jabrayil Hasanov (AZE)	6

Semifinals
Mihály Nagy (HUN)	0
Martin Obst (GER)	2
Akhmed Gadzhimagomedov (RUS)	6
Jabrayil Hasanov (AZE)	4

Final
Martin Obst (GER)	3
Akhmed Gadzhimagomedov (RUS)	6

=== Repechage ===
Repechage round 1
Alexandru Burcă (MDA)	10
Jevgeni Soltruk (EST)	1
Muhammet Nuri Kotanoğlu (TUR)	7
Johnny Bur (FRA)	4

Bronze medal match
Alexandru Burcă (MDA)	1
Mihály Nagy (HUN)	8
Muhammet Nuri Kotanoğlu (TUR)	4
Jabrayil Hasanov (AZE)	10
