= Golden Grand Prix Ivan Yarygin 2018 – Men's freestyle 79 kg =

The men's freestyle 79 kg is a competition featured at the Golden Grand Prix Ivan Yarygin 2018, and was held in Krasnoyarsk, Russia on 27 January.

== Medalists ==
Gold	(Dagestan) Akhmed Gadzhimagomedov
Silver	(United States) Kyle Dake
Bronze	(North Ossetia–Alania) Radik Valiev
Bronze	(North Ossetia–Alania) Alan Zaseev

== Results ==
Legend

- F — Won by fall

=== Final ===
Final
(United States) Kyle Dake	2
(Dagestan) Akhmed Gadzhimagomedov	8

=== Top half ===
- qualification: Tzhudin Akaev of Dagestan vs. Radik Valiev of RNO-Alania def. (3-4)

Qualification
(Dagestan) Akhmed Gadzhimagomedov	7
(Turkey) Muhammet Kutanoglu	1
(Uzbekistan) Isa Shapiev	12
(Turkmenistan) Sahergeldi Saparmyrdaov	2

Quarterfinals
(Kazakhstan) Baibolsyn Kurmanbekov	0
(Uzbekistan) Rashid Kurbanov	11
(United States) Kyle Dake	9
(North Ossetia–Alania) Alan Zaseev	7
(North Ossetia–Alania) Radik Valiev	12
(Georgia (country)) Tariel Gaphrindshvili	5
(Dagestan) Akhmed Gadzhimagomedov	6
(Uzbekistan) Isa Shapiev	2

Semifinals
(Uzbekistan) Rashid Kurbanov	0
(United States) Kyle Dake	10
(North Ossetia–Alania) Radik Valiev	1
(Dagestan) Akhmed Gadzhimagomedov	2

Final
-
-

== Repechage ==
Repechage round 1
-
-
-
-

Repechage round 2
(Uzbekistan) Isa Shapiev	2
(Turkey) Muhammet Kutanoglu	2
-
-

Bronze medals
(Turkey) Muhammet Kutanoglu	0
(North Ossetia–Alania) Radik Valiev	10
(North Ossetia–Alania) Alan Zaseev	9
(Uzbekistan) Rashid Kurbanov	0
