= 2017 European Wrestling Championships – Men's freestyle 74 kg =

The men's freestyle 74 kg is a competition featured at the 2017 European Wrestling Championships, and was held in Novi Sad, Serbia on May 4.

== Medalists ==
Gold	Soner Demirtaş; Turkey
Silver	Murad Suleymanov; Azerbaijan
Bronze	Akhmed Gadzhimagomedov; Russia
Bronze	Grigor Grigoryan; Armenia

== Results ==
Legend

- F — Won by fall
- WO — Won by Walkover

=== Final ===
Final
Murad Suleymanov (AZE)	4
Soner Demirtaş (TUR)	6

=== Top half ===
==== Section 1 ====
Round of 32

Round of 16
Ali Shabanau (BLR)	6
Oleksiy Shcherbak (UKR)	2
Akhmed Gadzhimagomedov (RUS)	7
Henri Selenius (FIN)	1
Murad Suleymanov (AZE)	4
Taimuraz Friev (ESP)	1
Zelimkhan Khadjiev (FRA)	11
Martin Obst (GER)	0

Quarterfinals
Ali Shabanau (BLR)	0
Akhmed Gadzhimagomedov (RUS)	4
Murad Suleymanov (AZE)	10
Zelimkhan Khadjiev (FRA)	5

Semifinals
Akhmed Gadzhimagomedov (RUS)	3
Murad Suleymanov (AZE)	5

=== Bottom half ===
Round of 32
Vasile Minzala (ROU)	1
Avtandil Kentchadze (GEO)	5
Evgheni Nedealco (MDA)	1
Svetoslav Dimitrov (BUL)	5
Andrzej Sokalski (POL)	11
Michal Duba (SVK)	0
Amirkhan Visalimov (AUT)	1
Grigor Grigoryan (ARM)	10

Round of 16
Kyrillos Binenmpaoum (GRE)	0
Soner Demirtaş (TUR)	10
Zaur Efendiev (SRB)	10
Hanoch Rachamin (ISR)	0
Avtandil Kentchadze (GEO)	15
Svetoslav Dimitrov (BUL)	4
Andrzej Sokalski (POL)	0
Grigor Grigoryan (ARM)	6

Quarterfinals
Soner Demirtaş (TUR)	6^{F}
Zaur Efendiev (SRB)	11
Avtandil Kentchadze (GEO)	4
Grigor Grigoryan (ARM)	5

Semifinals
Soner Demirtaş (TUR)	8
Grigor Grigoryan (ARM)	6

=== Repechage ===
Repechage round 2
Taimuraz Friev (ESP)	1
Zelimkhan Khadjiev (FRA)	4
Kyrillos Binenmpaoum (GRE)	WO
Zaur Efendiev (SRB)

Bronze medals
Zelimkhan Khadjiev (FRA)	5
Akhmed Gadzhimagomedov (RUS)	12
Kyrillos Binenmpaoum (GRE)	3
Grigor Grigoryan (ARM)	9
