= Wrestling at the 2014 Asian Games – Men's freestyle 74 kg =

Men's freestyle 74 kg at the 2014 Asian Games
- Venue: Dowon Gymnasium
- Date: 29 September 2014
- Competitors: 14 from 14 nations

Medalists
gold medal	Rashid Kurbanov	Uzbekistan
silver medal	Ezzatollah Akbari	Iran
bronze medal	Lee Sang-kyu	South Korea
bronze medal	Narsingh Yadav	India

The men's freestyle 74 kilograms wrestling competition at the 2014 Asian Games in Incheon was held on 29 September 2014 at the Dowon Gymnasium.

This freestyle wrestling competition consisted of a single-elimination tournament, with a repechage used to determine the winner of two bronze medals. The two finalists faced off for gold and silver medals. Each wrestler who lost to one of the two finalists moved into the repechage, culminating in a pair of bronze medal matches featuring the semifinal losers each facing the remaining repechage opponent from their half of the bracket.

== Schedule ==
All times are Korea Standard Time (UTC+09:00)

Date	Time	Event
Monday, 29 September 2014	13:00	1/8 finals
Monday, 29 September 2014	13:00	Quarterfinals
Monday, 29 September 2014	13:00	Semifinals
Monday, 29 September 2014	13:00	Repechages
Monday, 29 September 2014	19:00	Finals

== Results ==
=== Main bracket ===
1/8 finals
Lee Sang-kyu (KOR)	7
Dorjvaanchigiin Gombodorj (MGL)	3
Zhang Chongyao (CHN)	10
Buni Lal Raut (NEP)	0
Zaw Myint Tun (MYA)	0
Azamat Sufiev (TJK)	10
Innokenti Innokentev (KGZ)	3
Daisuke Shimada (JPN)	4
Rashid Kurbanov (UZB)	3
Narsingh Yadav (IND)	2
Ramazan Kambarow (TKM)	10
Mohammed Al-Quhali (YEM)	0

Quarterfinals
Ezzatollah Akbari (IRI)	10
Muhammad Asad Butt (PAK)	0
Lee Sang-kyu (KOR)	10
Zhang Chongyao (CHN)	6
Azamat Sufiev (TJK)	0
Daisuke Shimada (JPN)	10
Rashid Kurbanov (UZB)	10
Ramazan Kambarow (TKM)	0

Semifinals
Ezzatollah Akbari (IRI)	4
Lee Sang-kyu (KOR)	3
Daisuke Shimada (JPN)	3
Rashid Kurbanov (UZB)	5

Gold medal
Ezzatollah Akbari (IRI)	2
Rashid Kurbanov (UZB)	3

=== Repechage ===
Repechage
Narsingh Yadav (IND)	11
Ramazan Kambarow (TKM)	1

Bronze medals
Muhammad Asad Butt (PAK)	2
Lee Sang-kyu (KOR)	6
Narsingh Yadav (IND)	10
Daisuke Shimada (JPN)	7

== Final standing ==
Rank	Athlete
1st place, gold medalist(s)	Rashid Kurbanov (UZB)
2nd place, silver medalist(s)	Ezzatollah Akbari (IRI)
3rd place, bronze medalist(s)	Lee Sang-kyu (KOR)
3rd place, bronze medalist(s)	Narsingh Yadav (IND)
5	Muhammad Asad Butt (PAK)
5	Daisuke Shimada (JPN)
7	Zhang Chongyao (CHN)
8	Ramazan Kambarow (TKM)
9	Azamat Sufiev (TJK)
10	Innokenti Innokentev (KGZ)
11	Dorjvaanchigiin Gombodorj (MGL)
12	Mohammed Al-Quhali (YEM)
12	Buni Lal Raut (NEP)
12	Zaw Myint Tun (MYA)
