= 2026 World Wrestling Championships – Men's freestyle 86 kg =

Wrestling competitions

Men's freestyle 86 kg at the 2026 World Championships
- Venue: Barys Arena
- Dates: 30–31 October 2026
- Competitors: 41 from 41 nations

Medalists
gold medal	Kyle Dake	United States
silver medal	Arsenii Dzhioev	Azerbaijan
bronze medal	Vladimeri Gamkrelidze	Georgia
bronze medal	Malik Shavaev	Kyrgyzstan

The men's freestyle 86 kilograms is a competition featured at the 2026 World Wrestling Championships, and was held in Astana, Kazakhstan on 30 and 31 October 2026.

This freestyle wrestling competition consists of a single-elimination tournament, with a repechage used to determine the winner of two bronze medals. The two finalists face off for gold and silver medals. Each wrestler who loses to one of the two finalists moves into the repechage, culminating in a pair of bronze medal matches, featuring the semifinal losers each facing the remaining repechage opponent from their half of the bracket.

== Results ==
Legend

- F — Won by fall

=== Finals ===
Semifinals		Final
Arsenii Dzhioev (AZE)	9
Vladimeri Gamkrelidze (GEO)	1	Arsenii Dzhioev (AZE)	2
Ibragim Kadiev (RUS)	3	Kyle Dake (USA)	3
Kyle Dake (USA)	6

=== Top half ===
==== Section 1 ====
Round of 64
Ahmed Gamal Mohamed (EGY)	8
Pushpender Dalal (IND)	10
Owen Martin (CAN)	3
Jorge Llano (ARG)	0
Chris Foca (DOM)	4^{F}
Ángel Cortés (PAN)	0

Round of 32
Arsenii Dzhioev (AZE)	7
Khidir Saipudinov (BRN)	1
Mohamed Amine El-Mekkaoui (MAR)	9
Pushpender Dalal (IND)	17
Owen Martin (CAN)	0
Chris Foca (DOM)	5
Traian Căpățînă (MDA)	1
Georgios Kougioumtsidis (GRE)	12

Round of 16
Arsenii Dzhioev (AZE)	7
Pushpender Dalal (IND)	2
Chris Foca (DOM)	4
Georgios Kougioumtsidis (GRE)	14

Quarterfinals
Arsenii Dzhioev (AZE)	3
Georgios Kougioumtsidis (GRE)	1

==== Section 2 ====
Round of 64
Fateh Benferdjallah (ALG)	0
Boris Makoev (SVK)	10
Valentyn Babii (UKR)	9
İsmail Küçüksolak (TUR)	4

Round of 32
Vladimeri Gamkrelidze (GEO)	8
Krisztian Biro (ROU)	1
Joshua Morodion (GER)	3
Boris Makoev (SVK)	2
Valentyn Babii (UKR)	7
Bobur Islomov (UZB)	4
Gabriel McDuffie (SLE)	0
Rakhim Magamadov (FRA)	10

Round of 16
Vladimeri Gamkrelidze (GEO)	4
Joshua Morodion (GER)	3
Valentyn Babii (UKR)	0
Rakhim Magamadov (FRA)	10

Quarterfinals
Vladimeri Gamkrelidze (GEO)	7
Rakhim Magamadov (FRA)	4

=== Bottom half ===
==== Section 3 ====
Round of 64
Miko Elkala (FIN)	10
Arcmen Willis (NRU)	0
Gary Chow (SGP)	0
Cao Nan (CHN)	10

Round of 32
Ibragim Kadiev (RUS)	9
Natsura Okazawa (JPN)	3
Alvin Pao (HKG)	0
Miko Elkala (FIN)	10
Cao Nan (CHN)	2
Ahmad Magomedov (MKD)	0
Simon Marchl (AUT)	0
Ivars Samušonoks (LAT)	7

Round of 16
Ibragim Kadiev (RUS)	14
Miko Elkala (FIN)	3
Cao Nan (CHN)	5
Ivars Samušonoks (LAT)	2

Quarterfinals
Ibragim Kadiev (RUS)	11
Cao Nan (CHN)	1

==== Section 4 ====
Round of 64
Kyle Dake (USA)	6
Naadambatyn Batbilgüün (MGL)	5
Malik Shavaev (KGZ)	10
Ethan Ramos (PUR)	4

Round of 32
Bolat Sakayev (KAZ)	4
Gabriel Iglesias (ESP)	0
Paulius Leščauskas (LTU)	2
Kyle Dake (USA)	13
Malik Shavaev (KGZ)	5^{F}
Umar Mavlaev (SUI)	0
Magomed Ramazanov (BUL)	3
Kamran Ghasempour (IRI)	5

Round of 16
Bolat Sakayev (KAZ)	0
Kyle Dake (USA)	11
Malik Shavaev (KGZ)	3^{F}
Kamran Ghasempour (IRI)	1

Quarterfinals
Kyle Dake (USA)	6
Malik Shavaev (KGZ)	2

=== Repechage ===
Repechage round 1
Naadambatyn Batbilgüün (MGL)	11
Paulius Leščauskas (LTU)	0

Repechage round 2
Khidir Saipudinov (BRN)	11
Pushpender Dalal (IND)	0
Naadambatyn Batbilgüün (MGL)	7
Bolat Sakayev (KAZ)	5

Repechage round 3
Khidir Saipudinov (BRN)	4
Georgios Kougioumtsidis (GRE)	8
Naadambatyn Batbilgüün (MGL)	4
Malik Shavaev (KGZ)	7

Bronze medals
Georgios Kougioumtsidis (GRE)	0
Vladimeri Gamkrelidze (GEO)	6
Malik Shavaev (KGZ)	4
Ibragim Kadiev (RUS)	3

== Final standing ==
Rank	Athlete
1st place, gold medalist(s)	Kyle Dake (USA)
2nd place, silver medalist(s)	Arsenii Dzhioev (AZE)
3rd place, bronze medalist(s)	Vladimeri Gamkrelidze (GEO)
3rd place, bronze medalist(s)	Malik Shavaev (KGZ)
5	Georgios Kougioumtsidis (GRE)
5	Ibragim Kadiev (RUS)
7	Cao Nan (CHN)
8	Chris Foca (DOM)
9	Rakhim Magamadov (FRA)
10	Miko Elkala (FIN)
11	Naadambatyn Batbilgüün (MGL)
12	Pushpender Dalal (IND)
13	Khidir Saipudinov (BRN)
14	Valentyn Babii (UKR)
15	Boris Makoev (SVK)
16	Ivars Samušonoks (LAT)
17	Bolat Sakayev (KAZ)
18	Joshua Morodion (GER)
19	Kamran Ghasempour (IRI)
20	Owen Martin (CAN)
21	Mohamed Amine El-Mekkaoui (MAR)
22	Ahmed Gamal Mohamed (EGY)
23	Bobur Islomov (UZB)
24	İsmail Küçüksolak (TUR)
25	Ethan Ramos (PUR)
26	Magomed Ramazanov (BUL)
27	Natsura Okazawa (JPN)
28	Paulius Leščauskas (LTU)
29	Krisztian Biro (ROU)
30	Traian Căpățînă (MDA)
31	Ahmad Magomedov (MKD)
32	Jorge Llano (ARG)
33	Ángel Cortés (PAN)
34	Gabriel Iglesias (ESP)
35	Umar Mavlaev (SUI)
36	Simon Marchl (AUT)
37	Fateh Benferdjallah (ALG)
38	Gabriel McDuffie (SLE)
39	Alvin Pao (HKG)
40	Arcmen Willis (NRU)
41	Gary Chow (SGP)
