= Kaba meteorite =

Meteorite that hit Kaba, Hungary in 1857

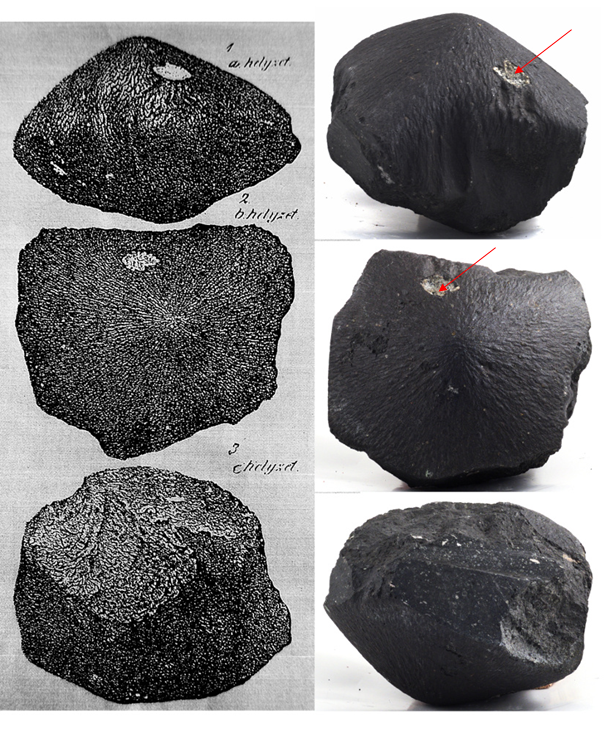
Kaba meteorite - On the left, in drawings taken after its discovery, and on the right, in photos taken in a similar position to the drawings, today. The arrow points to a CAl (calcium alumina) inclusion. – From study of Mihály Nagy Photo by Sándor Nagy

The Kaba meteorite (original Hungarian name: Kabai meteorit), a 2,601 kilogram stone, struck the outskirts of the Hungarian town of Kaba on 15 April 1857 at around 10 pm. The roughly loaf-shaped meteorite has a maximum diameter of 16.4 centimeters, a minimum diameter of 10 centimeters and a height of 10.8 centimeters. Its mass on the ground must have been about four kilograms. Its official name as recorded in the Meteoritical Bulletin is Kaba.

It was one of the first meteorites in which organic material was detected. Its carbon content is 2% by weight. Containing relatively large chondrules, it is a CV3-type carbonaceous chondrite, which is relatively rare among meteorites. Its cosmological study offers a wealth of information on the period of formation of the Solar System.

== History after impact ==
Gábor Szilágyi, a farmer from Kaba, observed the meteorite fall and hit the ground at about 10 o'clock in the evening of 15 April 1857, and the next day he found it and dug it out of the ground, taking his neighbors with him. The stone, intact when found, must have weighed almost 4 kg (7 lbs), but was mutilated by the locals in the hope of finding precious metals. Finally, a few days later, thanks to Kaba's magistrates, the meteorite, still weighing almost 3 kg, was taken to the Debreceni Református Kollégium, where József Török, a teacher of natural history, was the first expert to handle it. On 7 June 1858, at the Hungarian Academy of Sciences, he gave a thorough description of it and presented a three-page drawing of it, based on photographs by Emmanuel Mariotte. The first description already referred to the black balls, the size of a peppercorn, some of which have a shell-like structure. This chondritic character of the meteorite was described by the academic as 'unparalleled'.

Because of its discovery and where it is preserved, the meteorite was referred to as the "Kaba-Debrecen flint" in contemporary reports.

The college did not hand over the stone, despite the demands of the Imperial Cabinet of Mineralogy in Vienna, but some fragments were sent to the German chemist Friedrich Wöhler, who carried out a chemical analysis of the stone for two consecutive years. The stone is still kept in the museum of Debreceni Református Kollégium Múzeuma, and its fragments can be found in about twenty places around the world, including Kolkata, London, Vienna, Moscow and Washington.

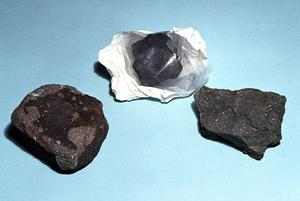
Some pictures of carbonaceous chondrite: Allende, Tagish Lake and Murchison. Among them, Allende resembles the Kaba meteorite.

Every year, the people of Kaba celebrate Kaba Town Day on the anniversary of the fall. Since 2009, the probable site of the burial has been commemorated by a memorial stone along a dune road near kilometer 193 of Highway 4.

== Mineralogical characterization of the Kaba meteorite ==
The CV3 carbonaceous chondrites were subdivided into three subgroups by Harry McSween (1977) and then by Michael K. Weisberg et al.(1997)

(1) Reduced subgroup (e.g. Vigarano, Efremovka, Leoville),

(2) Oxidized Allende type subgroup (e.g. Allende),

(3) Oxidized Bali type subgroup (e.g. Bali, Kaba, Grosnaja, Mokoia).

=== Mineralogical comparison between the three subgroups ===
Matrix frequency and weight: oxidized Bali > oxidized Allende > reduced CV

Metal : magnetite ratio: reduced > oxidized Allende > oxidized Bali

Fayalite forsterite series composition: red (Fa 32–60) - ox. All (Fa 32–60) - ox. Ba (Fa 10–90)

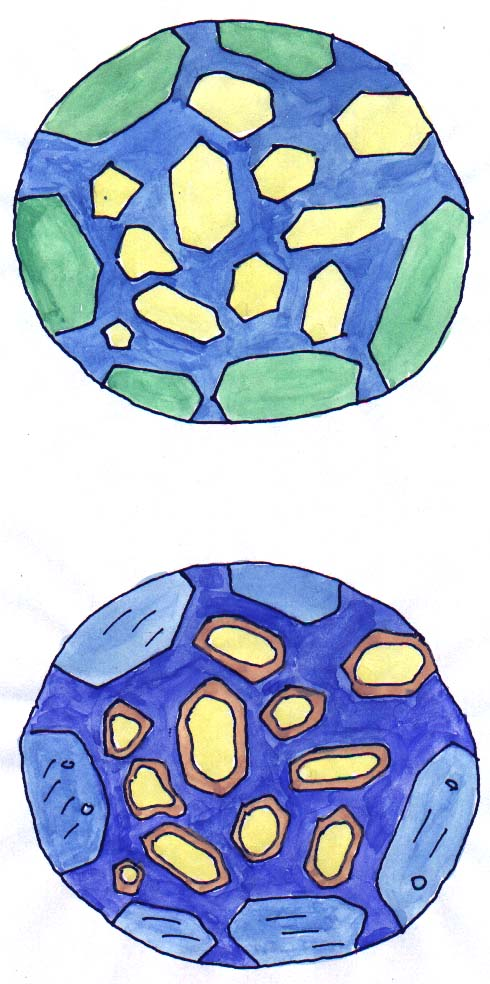
In the Kaba meteorite, the chondrules that underwent aqueous alteration also underwent such a transformation. Here, we see the olive crystals of a porphyritic chondrule as the aqueous alteration forms a weathering rim.

Pure fayalite occurs only in the oxidized Bali type. Phyllosilicate also occurs only in the oxidized Bali type.

Metal: Ni rich in the oxidized Allende type, mainly Ni rich in the oxidized Bali type, and Ni-poor in the reduced type.

The low Ca pyroxene occurs in the reduced ones, while the oxidized ones contain Ca-Fe. In oxidized CV3 (ox)A-type Allende, nepheline, sodalite, wollastonite, and andradite and grossular garnets are also found. The Kaba meteorite is of type CV3 (ox)B. The oxidized type A is Allende, and the oxidized type B is named after the Bali carbonaceous chondrite meteorite. They have a higher porosity than the reduced CV3 (red) type.

=== Metamorphism ===
The metamorphism associated with heating has been measured in various minerals. The data obtained by thermoluminescence on feldspars are as follows: Kaba, Bali, Axtel, Leoville: grade 3.0 (meaning that the least heated on the parent feldspar), Allende, Mokoia and Efremovka: grade 3.2, while Vigarano and Grosnaja are grade 3.3.

Based on Raman spectroscopy measurements, olivine zonation, presolar grain density and other characteristics, a different data set for the degree of metamorphism (i.e. subtype between van Schmus-Wood degree 3 and 4) was obtained. The resulting metamorphic subtypes are Kaba: 3. 1, Leoville, Vigarano, Efremovka: between 3.2 and 3.4, Grosnaja and Mokoia: 3.6 and the others, i.e. Bali, Allende and Axtel, are greater than 3.6.

=== Aqueous transformation ===
This process was carried out in the oxidized Bali-type with a higher degree of aqueous metamorphism, which was subsequently subjected to thermal stress, and is evidenced by the presence of phyllosilicate, fayalite, magnetite, and sulphide in the fabric.

=== Special minerals, inclusions ===
The CAI content, SiC content, nanodiamond content and noble gases of Kaba are also worth investigating. Since Kaba has a high carbon content (ca. 2.0 wt%), the investigation of various carbon modifications is also promising. These include weakly graphitized carbon and fullerenes. Among these, the study of nanodiamonds was carried out by cathodoluminescence method.

CAIs (calcium-alumina inclusions) are the oldest mineral outcrops in the Solar System, with an age of 4.567 gigaannum (Ga), or 4.567 billion years (Allende measurement). The surrounding rim (Wark-Lovering-rim) shows how dust layers were thermally precipitated and burnt onto the CAIs. The CAI (white inclusion) of Kaba is also worth re-examining because Kálmán Sztrókay was the first to measure the mineral composition of the CAIs in the Kaba meteorite and found them to be spinel. Since then, the layered stacking of several mineral components has been detected in CAIs.

=== Shock ===
Kaba's transformation by impact pressure was measured as S1 (shock stage) on a 0-6 scale. The weak stratification attests to this. The laminated fabric structure was measured at Eötvös Loránd University on a sample of Kaba meteorite from the 13 December 1995 cut-off. The stratification was confirmed by a new analytical method (computer tomography scanning).

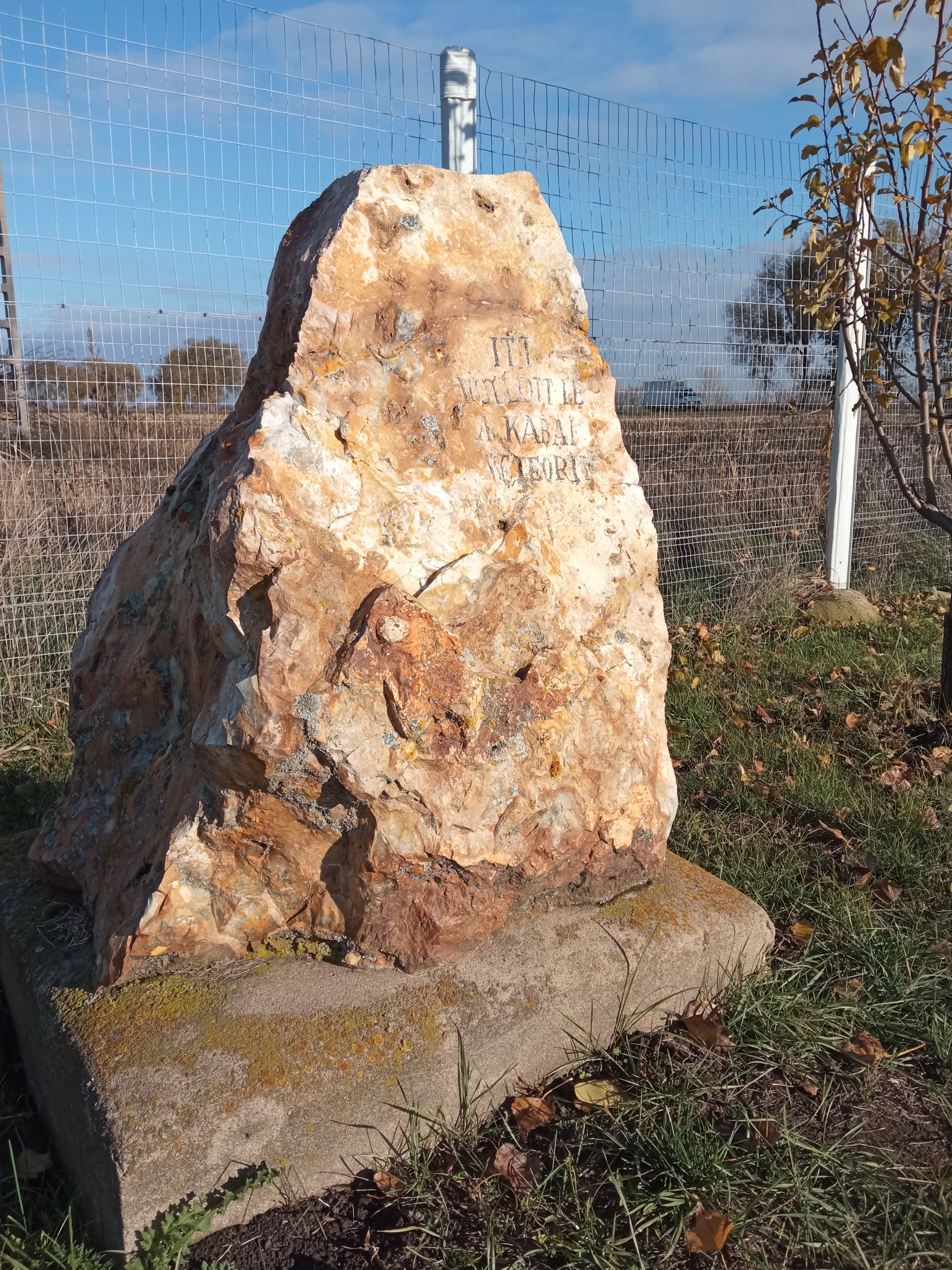
A memorial stone placed on the outskirts of Kaba, near the probable meteorite fall site (Photo: Mihály Nagy)

== Conference on the Kaba meteorite ==
In the autumn of 2017, an international conference was held at the Debreceni Református Kollégium on the latest results of research on the Kaba meteorite. The material of the twenty-two presentations was also published in book form.
