= Mihály Nagy =

Hungarian educator and scientist (born 1937)

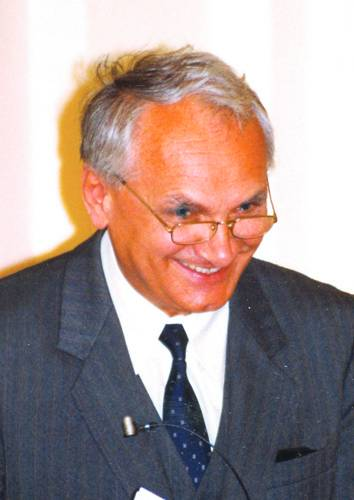
- Born: 24 January 1937 (age 89); Debrecen, Hungary
- Education: University of Debrecen
- Spouse: Erika Nyáry
- Children: 3
- Awards: Knight's Cross of the Hungarian Order of Merit

Mihály Nagy (born Debrecen, Hungary, 24 January 1937) Mikola Sándor Prize winner, high school teacher; research teacher; high school principal; university doctor; mineralogist; meteorite researcher; Honorary Ph.D.

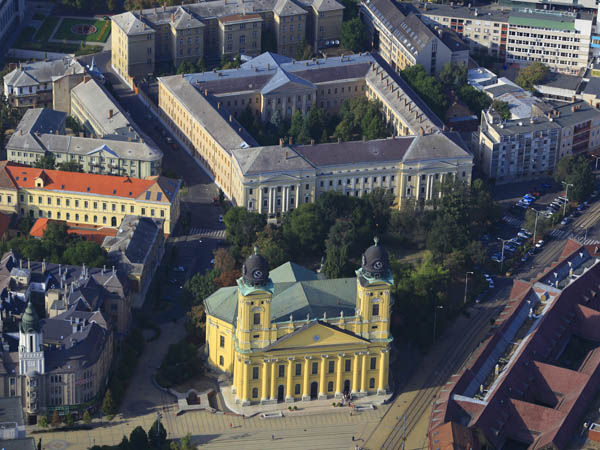
The Gymnasium of the Reformed College, Mihály Nagy's only workplace in his life - with the Reformed Great Church of Debrecen in the foreground

== Studies ==
Mihály Nagy completed his secondary school studies at the Debreceni Református Kollégium gimnáziuma graduating in 1955. He graduated from the Faculty of Science of the University of Debrecen in 1959 with a degree in chemistry and physics. In addition to his teaching work, he was awarded a scholarship by the Hungarian Academy of Sciences in 1969.

For four years, once a week, he worked as a fellow researcher and then as a visiting researcher at Institute for Nuclear Research (Atommag Kutató Intézet - ATOMKI) in Debrecen.

Nagy was awarded in 1974 as a doctor of science at the University of Debrecen summa cum laude. As a result of his decades-long working and research relationship with the University of Debrecen's Department of Mineralogy and Geology, on the proposal of the department, the Council and Dean of University of Debrecen's Természettudományi és Technológiai Kar Tanácsa awarded him the title of Honorary Associate Professor in 2020.

== Career ==
Nagy's only job from 1959 until his retirement was at the Debreceni Református Kollégium gimnáziuma, where he taught physics and chemistry.

From 1987 to 1992, he was deputy headmaster, and from 1992 until his retirement in 1996 he was headmaster of his alma mater.

== Work ==
=== Scientific activity ===
==== Nuclear research ====
Nagy, as a scholarship holder of the Hungarian Academy of Sciences, in addition to his teaching work, he also did research work at Institute for Nuclear Research in Debrecen. He has published in several well-known domestic and foreign scientific journals. In 1974, using these, he wrote and defended his doctoral dissertation entitled Ancient Track Investigations and Nuclear Physics Experiments in High School with a Solid-State Trace Detector.

==== Scientific playhouse ====
Between 1984 and 1996, he was elected secretary of the Hajdú-Bihar county group of the Eötvös Loránd Fizikai Társulat (ELFT). In 1986, he became the national vice president of ELFT for four years. After that, he was the co-chairman of the Hajdú-Bihar county organization of the Műszaki és Természettudományi Egyesületek Szövetsége (MTESz) between 1990 and 1998. He has been the chairman of the board of trustees of the „Varázskuckó Debrecen” Természettudományos Játszóház Alapítvány, a natural science playhouse foundation, which operated the playhouse, for sixteen years since 2001.

==== Research on the Kaba meteorite ====
Since 2010, Mihály Nagy was increasingly involved in meteorite research. This may be due to the fact that the world-famous Kaba meteorite is kept in the museum of the Reformed College of Debrecen, where he was also a high school principal. According to his definition, the cosmological study of meteorites offers information about the period of the formation of the Solar System. He has published books and studies based on his research, and his outstanding research achievement was the presentation of the meteorite's layered structure on SEM and CT images. He has given numerous scientific and scientific-educational lectures at international conferences, universities, colleges, conferences of the ELFT and the Magyarhoni Földtani Társulat, in-service teacher training, and houses of culture.

=== Church, public activity ===
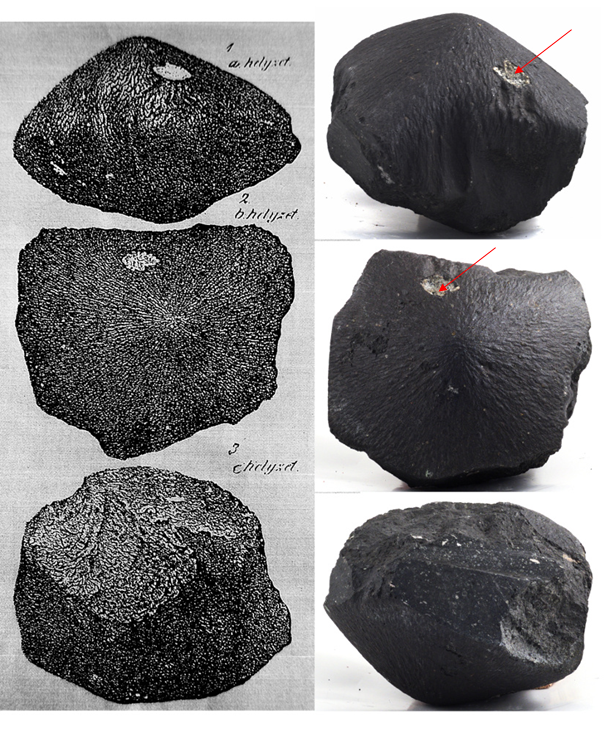
Kaba meteorite - On the left, in drawings taken after its discovery, and on the right, in photos taken in a similar position to the drawings, today. The arrow points to a CAl (calcium alumina) inclusion. – From study of Mihály Nagy Photo by Sándor Nagy

Nagy was one of the elders of the Reformed Church of Debrecen-Csapókert between 1957 and 1964, then he became the elder of the Reformed Church of Debrecen-Nagytemplom from 1969 for thirty years. He was one of the elders of the Reformed Church of Debrecen-Nagyerdő between 1965 and 2006, and then became an honorary presbyter there.

In 1978, he was elected presidential chief notary of the Reformed Diocese of Debrecen, then from 1996 to 2008 he was its custodian. From 1991 to 1997, he was elected president of the reorganized Országos Református Tanáregyesület, and from 1997 he was elected honorary president.

He was the regional president of the Magyar Református Presbiteri Szövetség between 2002 and 2006, and from 2014 to 2021 he was the pedagogical advisor of the national association.

== Family ==
Nagy is a descendant of an old Debrecen family, his father was a local craftsman and merchant.

In 1959 he married Erika Nyáry, a teacher majoring in Hungarian, Latin and Russian.

They have three children, seven grandchildren, three great-grandchildren.

== Awards, recognitions ==
- XIII. Országos Középiskolai Fizikatanári Ankét – I. Díj. Az alfa részecskékkel bemutatható nyomdetektoros kísérletekért (Eötvös Loránd Fizikai Társulat) 1970
- Országos Pedagógiai Újítási Ankét és kiállítás Debrecen - megosztott I. Díj. Atomfizikai tanítási egység szemléltetése diafilmen. (Pedagógus Továbbképzési Intézet) 1973
- Mikola Sándor-díj – A kísérletezésen alapuló kiemelkedő fizikatanításért (ELFT) 1976
- XXVI. Országos Középiskolai Fizikatanári Ankét I. Díj. A Nukleáris Nyomdetektoros Alapkészletért (ELFT) 1983
- Vermes Miklós Díj – A tehetségápoló fizikatanításért (Vermes Miklós Tehetséggondozó Alapítvány, Sopron) 1993
- Hatvani István Díj – For outstanding activity in the field of natural sciences for the benefit of the city of Debrecen (Debrecen County Municipality) 1995
- Silver Cross of Merit of the Republic of Hungary (President of the Republic of Hungary) 1996
- Kerekes Ferenc Díj (Board of the Debrecen Reformed College) 2000
- Imre Sándor Díj (12th Synod of the Hungarian Reformed Church) 2003
- Knight's Cross of the Hungarian Order of Merit (President of the Republic of Hungary) 2012
- Honorary associate professor (Council and Dean of the Faculty of Science and Technology of the University of Debrecen) 2020
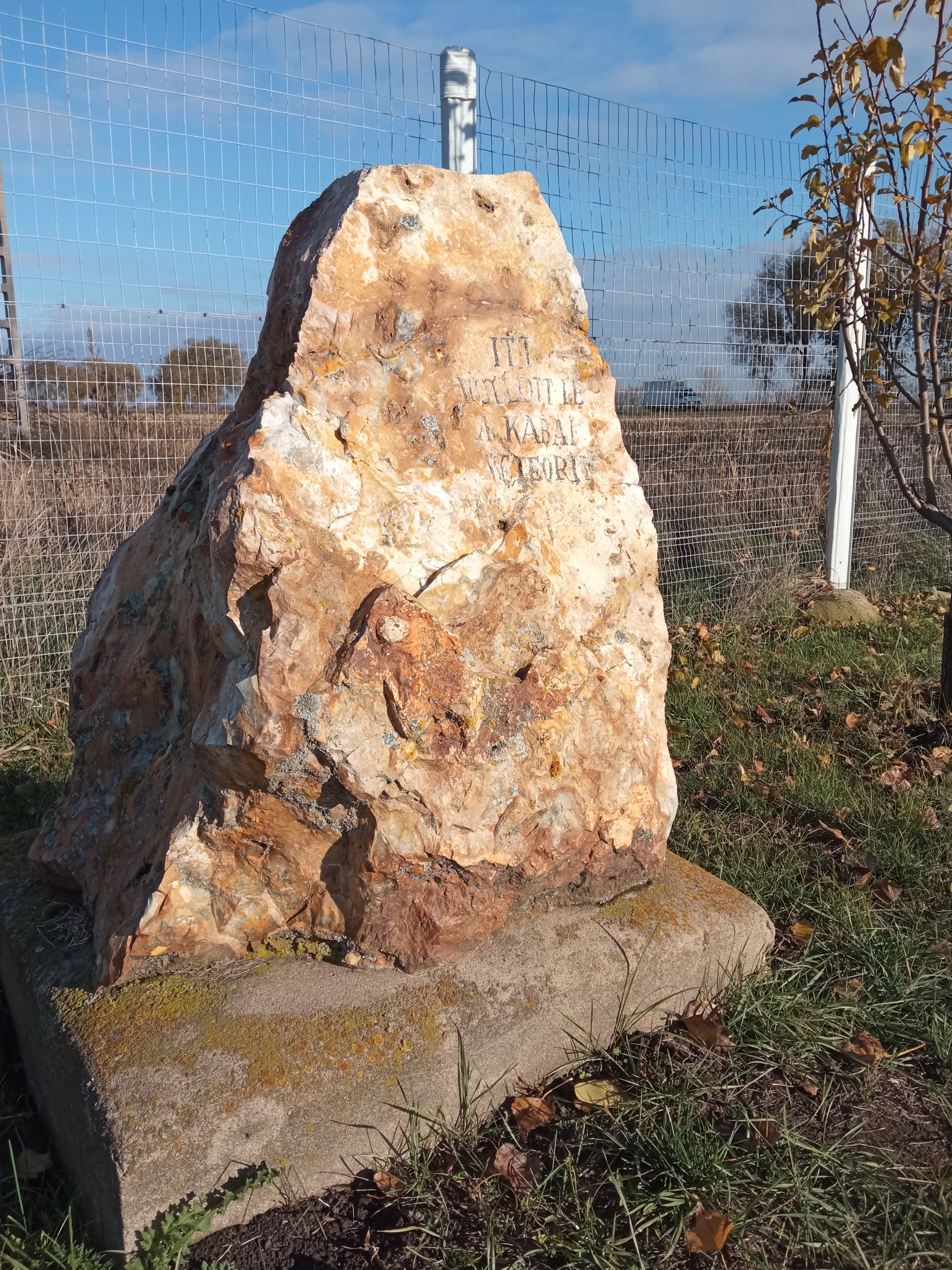
  Memorial stone near the probable fall site of the Kaba meteorite (Photo by Mihály Nagy)

== Publication ==
Mihály Nagy's publications in print until 2023 reach a total of 242. Of these, 89 are books, scientific publications partly with co-authors (including 15 in English or German). The number of scientific articles is 75, other publications in print 78. The exact amount of manuscript material, reports and teaching materials is not known. The following bibliography provides a selection of these.

=== Books ===
- Magfizikai kísérletek nukleáris nyomdetektorral Fakultatív tankönyv a gimnáziumok IV. osztálya számára. (Műszaki Könyvkiadó Bp.) 1985.; 2. kiadás (Tankönyvkiadó Bp.) 1987
- Atommagfizika (In Fizikai kísérletek gyűjteménye 3. Egyetemi-főiskolai tankönyv) 1996 (Vol. 3. p. 89-121)
- Színek, fények és formák az ásványok világában (Debreceni Egyetem, Kossuth Egyetemi Kiadó; Debreceni Református Kollégium) 2000 Published in Hungarian, English and German
- Szőnyi Pál. Tudós tanárok – tanár tudósok Series Editor: Jáki László (Országos Pedagógiai Könyvtár és Múzeum) 2001
- Ásványok a Bibliában (Debreceni Református Kollégium; Országos Református Tanáregyesület) 2003
- A Kaba-kő titka Tudománytörténeti színjáték 15 jelenetben (Református Tiszántúl kiadványai 3. kötet) Co-author: Kirsch Éva. Series Editor: Fekete Károly. 2007
- A kabai meteorit – The meteorite of Kaba (Debreceni Református Kollégium) 2008
- Felhők fölött a Nap – Pedagógiai tapasztalatok, visszaemlékezések (Debreceni Református Kollégium) 2013.; 2. javított, bővített kiadás (Magyar Református Presbiteri Szövetség) 2017
- Átfogó kutatások a kabai meteoriton – Comprehensive research on Kaba meteorite. Acta Geoscientia Debrecina 1. különszám (Debreceni Egyetemi Kiadó) Edited by Mihály Nagy - Péter Rózsa - Richard William McIntosh. 2018 (p. 7-8.; 17-18)
- A review of a carbonaceous chondrite: what can we learn from the Kaba meteorite? Co-author: Arpad, Csamer; Gucsik, Arnold; Jozsef, Vanyo; Diana, Skita; Peter, Rozsa; Gabor, Zelei IN: The 10th Symposium on Polar Science. 2019
- A hit és a tudomány határán (Magyar Református Presbiteri Szövetség) 2021 2. javított, bővített kiadás (Tiszántúli Református Egyházkerület) 2022

=== Studies ===
A selection of more than 200 published articles and 86 international scientific publications

- Szilárdtest nyomdetektorok az oktatásban Co-authors: G. Somogyi - L. Medveczky (Fizikai Szemle) 1971/11 (p. 344-354)
- Remarks on fission-track dating in dielectric solids Co-author: G. Somogyi (Radiation Effects) 1972. (Vol 16, p. 223-231)
- A debreceni Kollégium Szőnyi-féle ásványgyűjteménye Co-author: Szakáll S. (A debreceni Déri Múzeum évkönyve 1980) 1983. (p. 35-72.)
- Nukleáris nyomdetektoros alapkészlet a magfizika oktatásához (A Fizika Tanítása) 1983/6. (p. 180-184)
- A fizika és a 450 éves Debreceni Református Kollégium (Fizikai Szemle) 1989/3 (p. 96-104)
- Mineral Collection of the Calvinist College in Debrecen (Annals of the History of Hungarian Geology Special Issue 3.) 1991. (p. 313-320)
- Szőnyi Pál, az 1848-as vallás- és nevelésügyi minisztérium tanácsosa (Debreceni Szemle) 1998/3. (p. 347-366)
- Bay Zoltánra emlékezett a Debreceni Református Kollégium (Confessio A Magyarországi Református Egyház Figyelője) 1999/1. (p. 61-68)
- Ásványok a Bibliában – It was published in 26 consecutive parts in Reformátusok Lapja from 19.11.2000 to 19.12.2001.
- Százötven éve hullott a világhírű kaba-debreceni lebkő. (Fizikai Szemle) 2007/12. (p. 395)
- Minerals from the Reformed College of in the University of Debrecen Co-author: R. W. McIntosh ACTA GGM Debrecina Geology, Geomorphology, Physical Geography. Series, Vol 6-7. 2012. (71-80.o.)
- A kabai meteorit leírása részletgazdag fényképek alapján - Description of Kaba meteorite based on detail rich photographs. Co-author: Nagy Sándor IN: Átfogó kutatások a kabai meteoriton – Comprehensive Research on Kaba Meteorite (Debreceni Egyetemi Kiadó) 2018. (p. 71-80)
- Régi és új eredmények összekapcsolása a kabai meteorit kutatásában: A test réteges szerkezete a SEM és a CT felvételeken – Linking Old and New Resulrs in Kaba Meteorite Research: Layered structure of the meteorite body on SEM, and CT images. Co-author: Bérczi Szaniszló IN: Átfogó kutatások a kabai meteoriton – Comprehensive Research on Kaba Meteorite (Debreceni Egyetemi Kiadó) 2018. (p. 91-96)
- Determination of Chemical Components of Kaba Meteorite by LDI Ionization Methods Using a 15T FT -ICR Mass Spectrometer – LDI és ESI ionizációs 15T FT-ICR tömegspektrométer alkalmazása a kabai meteorit kémiai összetevőinek meghatározására Co-authors: Árpád Somogyi - József Posta IN: Átfogó kutatások a kabai meteoriton – Comprehensive Research on Kaba Meteorite (Debreceni Egyetemi Kiadó) 2018. (p. 169-178)
- Dokumentumok a kabai meteorit történetéből – Documents from history of Kaba Meteorite IN: Átfogó kutatások a kabai meteoriton – Comprehensive Research on Kaba Meteorite (Debreceni Egyetemi Kiadó) 2018. (p. 195-237)
