= Ezzatollah Akbari =

Iranian wrestler (born 1992)

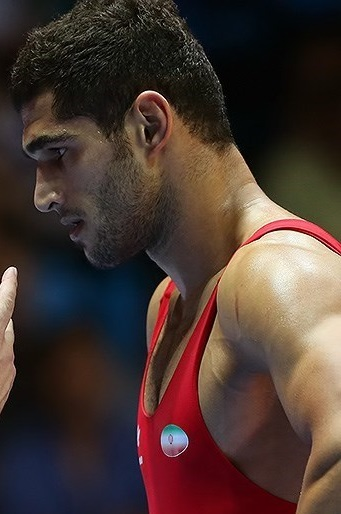

Personal information
- Native name: عزت‌الله اکبری زرین کلائی
- Full name: Ezzatollah Akbari Zarinkolaei
- Nationality: Iran
- Born: November 11, 1992 (age 33) Juybar, Iran
- Height: 1.86 m (6 ft 1 in)

Sport
- Country: Iran
- Sport: Wrestling
Medal record
Representing Iran
Men's freestyle wrestling
World Championships
Silver medal – second place	2013 Budapest	74 kg
Asian Games
Silver medal – second place	2014 Incheon	74 kg
Asian Championships
Gold medal – first place	2018 Bishkek	79 kg
Bronze medal – third place	2013 New Delhi	74 kg
Asian Indoor and Martial Arts Games
Gold medal – first place	2017 Ashgabat	86 kg

Ezzatollah Akbari Zarinkolaei (Persian: عزت‌الله اکبری زرین‌کلایی, born 11 November 1992 in Juybar, Iran) is an Iranian wrestler.
