= Akhmed Gadzhimagomedov =

Russian freestyle wrestler

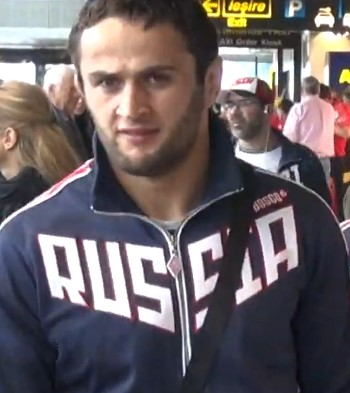

Personal information
- Native name: Ахмед Гаджимагомедов
- Full name: Akhmed Shiybudinovich Gadzhimagomedov
- Nickname: Zig-Zag
- National team: Russia
- Born: April 21, 1990 (age 36) Kalininaul, Kazbekovsky District, Republic of Dagestan, Russian SFSR, Soviet Union
- Height: 1.74 m (5 ft 9 in)
- Weight: 86 kg (190 lb) (2021); 79 kg (174 lb); 74 kg (163 lb)

Sport
- Country: Russia
- Sport: Wrestling
- Event: Freestyle
- Club: Shamil Umakhanov wrestling club (им. Шамиля Умаханова)
- Coached by: Magomed Guseinov; Gamzat Abbasov
Medal record
Representing Russia
Men's Freestyle Wrestling
World Championships
Bronze medal – third place	2018 Budapest	79 kg
European Championships
Gold medal – first place	2018 Kaspiysk	79 kg
Silver medal – second place	2019 Bucharest	79 kg
Bronze medal – third place	2017 Novi Sad	74 kg
Golden Grand Prix Ivan Yarygin
Gold medal – first place	2019 Krasnoyarsk	79 kg
Gold medal – first place	2018 Krasnoyarsk	79 kg
Gold medal – first place	2017 Krasnoyarsk	74 kg
Gold medal – first place	2015 Krasnoyarsk	74 kg
Bronze medal – third place	2016 Krasnoyarsk	74 kg

Akhmed (Ahmad) Shiybudinovich Gadzhimagomedov (Russian: Ахмед Шиябудинович Гаджимагомедов; born 21 April 1990) is a Russian former freestyle wrestler. 2018 world bronze medalist. 2018 European champion. He won a bronze medal at the 2017 European Wrestling Championships in 74 kg.

In June 2022, he ended his athletic career and was appointed coach of the Dagestan national team.

== Background ==
Akhmed was born in the village of Leninaul, Dagestan, into a Sunni Muslim family. He started freestyle wrestling at the age of 12.

He lived in Khasavyurt, where he was coached by Magomed Guseinov and Gamzat Abbasov. Akhmed is international Master of Sports in freestyle wrestling.

== Championships and achievements ==
- 2013 Ramzan Kadyrov & Adlan Varayev Cup – 1st (74 kg)
- 2013, 2014 Intercontinental Cup – 1st (74 kg)
- 2015 Ali Aliyev Memorial – 1st (74 kg)
- 2015 Golden Grand Prix Ivan Yarygin – 1st (74 kg)
- 2015 Russian Nationals – 3rd (74 kg)
- 2015 Golden Grand-Prix Baku – 3rd (74 kg)
- 2016 Golden Grand Prix Ivan Yarygin – 3rd (74 kg)
- 2016 Ali Aliyev Memorial – 2nd (74 kg)
- 2017 Golden Grand Prix Ivan Yarygin – 1st (74 kg)
- 2017 European Championships – 3rd (74 kg)
- 2018 Golden Grand Prix Ivan Yarygin – 1st (79 kg)
- 2018 Dan Kolov & Nikola Petrov Cup – 1st (79 kg)
- 2018 European Championships – 1st (79 kg)
- 2018 World Championships – 3rd (79 kg)
- 2019 Golden Grand Prix Ivan Yarygin – 1st (79 kg)
- 2019 European Championships – 2nd (79 kg)

== Personal life ==
Gadzhimagomedov is a devout Sunni Muslim. His favorite wrestler is Murad Gaidarov.
