= Zhang Chongyao =

Chinese sport wrestler

Zhang Chongyao (born 26 November 1985) is a Chinese wrestler. He competed for China at the 2012 Summer Olympics in the men's middleweight (-74 kg) freestyle wrestling competition.

== See also ==
- China at the 2012 Summer Olympics
