= Martin Obst =

German freestyle wrestler

Personal information
- Born: 18 November 1986 (age 40)
- Height: 170 cm (5 ft 7 in)

Sport
- Country: Germany
- Sport: Amateur wrestling
- Event: Freestyle
Medal record
Men's freestyle wrestling
Representing Germany
European Championships
Silver medal – second place	2018 Kaspiysk	79 kg

Martin Obst (born 18 November 1986) is a German freestyle wrestler. He won the silver medal in the 79 kg event at the 2018 European Wrestling Championships held in Kaspiysk, Russia.

In 2015, he competed in the men's freestyle 74 kg event at the World Wrestling Championships held in Las Vegas, United States. He competed in the men's freestyle 79 kg event at the 2018 World Wrestling Championships held in Budapest, Hungary.

== Achievements ==
Year	Tournament	Location	Result	Event
2018	European Championships	Kaspiysk, Russia	2nd	Freestyle 79 kg
