= Grigor Grigoryan =

Armenian freestyle wrestler

Personal information
- Born: 4 July 1992 (age 34) Armenia
- Height: 1.70 m (5 ft 7 in)
- Weight: 74 kg (163 lb)

Sport
- Sport: Wrestling
- Event: Freestyle
- Club: Malatia Yerevan
- Coached by: Norayr Serobyan
Medal record
Men's Freestyle wrestling
Representing Armenia
European Championships
Silver medal – second place	2014 Vantaa	70 kg
Bronze medal – third place	2017 Novi Sad	-74 kg

Grigor Grigoryan (Armenian: Գրիգոր Գրիգորյան, born 4 July 1992) is an Armenian freestyle wrestler. He competed at the 70 kg division in the 2014 European Wrestling Championships and won the silver medal.
