= Rashid Kurbanov =

Uzbekistani freestyle wrestler

Personal information
- Nationality: Uzbekistani; Russian
- Born: 16 February 1987 (age 39) Makhachkala, Dagestan, Russia
Medal record
Representing Uzbekistan
Men's freestyle wrestling
World Championships
Bronze medal – third place	2013 Budapest	74 kg
Asian Games
Gold medal – first place	2014 Incheon	74 kg
Asian Championships
Gold medal – first place	2011 Tashkent	74 kg
Gold medal – first place	2013 New Delhi	74 kg
Silver medal – second place	2018 Bishkek	79 kg
Bronze medal – third place	2015 Doha	74 kg
Bronze medal – third place	2014 Astana	86 kg

Rashid Magomedovich Kurbanov (born 16 February 1987 in Dagestan) is an Uzbekistani - Dagestani and Russian freestyle wrestler that competed at the 2013 World Wrestling Championships at 74 kg. He won bronze medal.

In 2020, he competed in the men's 79 kg event at the 2020 Individual Wrestling World Cup held in Belgrade, Serbia.
