= 2011 World Wrestling Championships – Men's freestyle 66 kg =

Men's freestyle 66 kg at the 2011 World Championships
- Venue: Sinan Erdem Dome
- Dates: 18 September 2011
- Competitors: 46 from 46 nations

Medalists
gold medal	Mehdi Taghavi	Iran
silver medal	Tatsuhiro Yonemitsu	Japan
bronze medal	Jabrayil Hasanov	Azerbaijan
bronze medal	Liván López	Cuba

The men's freestyle 66 kilograms is a competition featured at the 2011 World Wrestling Championships, and was held at the Sinan Erdem Dome in Istanbul, Turkey on 18 September 2011.

== Results ==
Legend

- F — Won by fall
- WO — Won by walkover

=== Finals ===
Semifinals			Final
Tatsuhiro Yonemitsu (JPN)	2	4
Leonid Bazan (BUL)	0	2	Tatsuhiro Yonemitsu (JPN)	0	0
Mehdi Taghavi (IRI)	3	3	Mehdi Taghavi (IRI)	1	3
Liván López (CUB)	0	0

=== Top half ===
==== Section 1 ====
Round of 64

Round of 32
Stelios Mama (CYP)	0	0
Jabrayil Hasanov (AZE)	7	5
Yoan Blanco (ECU)	0	0
Gergõ Wöller (HUN)	1	1
Ghandi Márquez (MEX)	0	2
Adam Sobieraj (POL)	1	4
Buyanjavyn Batzorig (MGL)	0	2
Tatsuhiro Yonemitsu (JPN)	2	2

Round of 16
Jabrayil Hasanov (AZE)	1	1
Gergõ Wöller (HUN)	0	0
Adam Sobieraj (POL)	0	1
Tatsuhiro Yonemitsu (JPN)	4	2

Quarterfinals
Jabrayil Hasanov (AZE)	4	0
Tatsuhiro Yonemitsu (JPN)	5	1

==== Section 2 ====
Round of 64

Round of 32
Yang Chun-song (PRK)	8	1
Elvis Fuentes (VEN)	0	0
Leonid Bazan (BUL)	5	6
Michel Dole (CGO)	0	0
Todisoa Ratolojanahary (MAD)	1	2
Issa Djakna (CHA)	0	0
Abdulai Rogers (SLE)	0
Vladimir Gotişan (MDA)	4^{F}

Round of 16
Yang Chun-song (PRK)	1	0	1
Leonid Bazan (BUL)	0	1	2
Todisoa Ratolojanahary (MAD)	0	0
Vladimir Gotişan (MDA)	4	5

Quarterfinals
Leonid Bazan (BUL)	1	1
Vladimir Gotişan (MDA)	0	0

=== Bottom half ===
==== Section 3 ====
Round of 64
Moisés Soto (PAN)	0	0
Somirsho Vokhidov (TJK)	7	7
Adam Batirov (RUS)	1	0	2
David Safaryan (ARM)	0	1	1
Mayeul Nganafio (CAF)	1	0
Innokenti Innokentev (KGZ)	6	6
Dejan Mitrov (MKD)	0	0
Mehdi Taghavi (IRI)	2	2
Haislan Garcia (CAN)	0	0
Ramazan Şahin (TUR)	3	1
Shalva Muziashvili (GEO)	0	0
Ali Shabanau (BLR)	1	2

Round of 32
Steven Graf (SUI)	0	0
Maxat Daulbayev (KAZ)	2	2
Somirsho Vokhidov (TJK)	0	1
Adam Batirov (RUS)	2	2
Innokenti Innokentev (KGZ)	0	3	0
Mehdi Taghavi (IRI)	1	1	1
Ramazan Şahin (TUR)	0	0
Ali Shabanau (BLR)	1	1

Round of 16
Maxat Daulbayev (KAZ)	1	0
Adam Batirov (RUS)	4	3
Mehdi Taghavi (IRI)	1	1
Ali Shabanau (BLR)	0	1

Quarterfinals
Adam Batirov (RUS)	1	0	0
Mehdi Taghavi (IRI)	0	1	1

==== Section 4 ====
Round of 64
Teyon Ware (USA)	1	0
Andriy Stadnik (UKR)	2	4
Sushil Kumar (IND)	6	7
Joseph Lopez (GUM)	0	0
Shan Chengde (CHN)	0
Jakub Kačeňák (SVK)	4^{F}
Yuri Poliak (ISR)	0	1
Yan Ceaban (ROU)	1	3
Heinrich Barnes (RSA)	0	0
Liván López (CUB)	4	4^{F}
Pietro Piscitelli (ITA)	0	1
Kim Dai-sung (KOR)	3	3
Ikhtiyor Navruzov (UZB)	2	6
Alexandros Samanidis (GRE)	0	0
Quintino Intipe (GBS)	1	0
Saba Bolaghi (GER)	4	3^{F}

Round of 32
Andriy Stadnik (UKR)	0	4	1
Sushil Kumar (IND)	2	0	1
Jakub Kačeňák (SVK)	3	1
Yan Ceaban (ROU)	0	0
Liván López (CUB)	1	6
Kim Dai-sung (KOR)	0	0
Ikhtiyor Navruzov (UZB)	1	0	2
Saba Bolaghi (GER)	0	1	0

Round of 16
Andriy Stadnik (UKR)	3	4
Jakub Kačeňák (SVK)	1	0
Liván López (CUB)	4	0	2
Ikhtiyor Navruzov (UZB)	2	5	1

Quarterfinals
Andriy Stadnik (UKR)	0	0
Liván López (CUB)	1	1

=== Repechage ===
Repechage round 1
Dejan Mitrov (MKD)
Innokenti Innokentev (KGZ)	W	O

Repechage round 2
Buyanjavyn Batzorig (MGL)	5	4
Adam Sobieraj (POL)	2	0
Innokenti Innokentev (KGZ)	1	2
Ali Shabanau (BLR)	0	0

Repechage round 3
Buyanjavyn Batzorig (MGL)	0	0
Jabrayil Hasanov (AZE)	1	7
Innokenti Innokentev (KGZ)	0	1
Adam Batirov (RUS)	1	4

Bronze medals
Jabrayil Hasanov (AZE)	2	4
Leonid Bazan (BUL)	0	2
Adam Batirov (RUS)	1	0
Liván López (CUB)	4	1
