= 2009 World Wrestling Championships – Men's freestyle 66 kg =

Men's freestyle 66 kg at the 2009 World Championships
- Venue: Messecenter Herning
- Dates: 21 September 2009
- Competitors: 34 from 34 nations

Medalists
gold medal	Mehdi Taghavi	Iran
silver medal	Rasul Dzhukaev	Russia
bronze medal	Tatsuhiro Yonemitsu	Japan
bronze medal	Leonid Spiridonov	Kazakhstan

The men's freestyle 66 kilograms is a competition featured at the 2009 World Wrestling Championships, and was held at the Messecenter Herning exhibition center in Herning, Denmark on September 21.

== Results ==
Legend

- F — Won by fall

=== Finals ===
Semifinals			Final
Sushil Kumar (IND)	1	1
Rasul Dzhukaev (RUS)	1	7	Rasul Dzhukaev (RUS)	0	0
Mehdi Taghavi (IRI)	1	5	Mehdi Taghavi (IRI)	1	1
Muhammed İlkhan (TUR)	0	0

=== Top half ===
==== Section 1 ====
Round of 64

Round of 32
Ştefan Daniliuc (ROU)	6	7
Raoni Barcelos (BRA)	0	0
Pietro Piscitelli (ITA)	0	0
Sushil Kumar (IND)	4	3^{F}
Bùi Tuấn Anh (VIE)	1	0
Jabrayil Hasanov (AZE)	7	7
Albert Batyrov (BLR)	4	0	0
Geandry Garzón (CUB)	1	4	5

Round of 16
Ştefan Daniliuc (ROU)	0	2
Sushil Kumar (IND)	2	3
Jabrayil Hasanov (AZE)	3	0	3^{F}
Geandry Garzón (CUB)	0	4	0

Quarterfinals
Sushil Kumar (IND)	0	4^{F}
Jabrayil Hasanov (AZE)	4	0

==== Section 2 ====
Round of 64

Round of 32
Yuri Poliak (ISR)	0	0
Gergõ Wöller (HUN)	4	5
Tatsuhiro Yonemitsu (JPN)	2	2
Zhirayr Hovhannisyan (ARM)	0	0
Rasul Dzhukaev (RUS)	1	1
Jung Young-ho (KOR)	0	0
Erlan Dorbonov (KGZ)	0	0
Adam Sobieraj (POL)	1	1

Round of 16
Gergõ Wöller (HUN)	0	0
Tatsuhiro Yonemitsu (JPN)	1	2
Rasul Dzhukaev (RUS)	1	2
Adam Sobieraj (POL)	1	0

Quarterfinals
Tatsuhiro Yonemitsu (JPN)	0	1
Rasul Dzhukaev (RUS)	1	3

=== Bottom half ===
==== Section 3 ====
Round of 64

Round of 32
Trent Paulson (USA)	1	0	1
Leonid Spiridonov (KAZ)	1	3	2
Alishoh Vokhidov (UZB)	1	3
Elvis Fuentes (VEN)	1	1
Victor Solo Badiate (SEN)	0	0
Andriy Stadnik (UKR)	1	7
Mehdi Taghavi (IRI)	1	2
Shalva Abajevi (GEO)	0	0

Round of 16
Leonid Spiridonov (KAZ)	2	3
Alishoh Vokhidov (UZB)	0	3
Andriy Stadnik (UKR)	0	0
Mehdi Taghavi (IRI)	1	1

Quarterfinals
Leonid Spiridonov (KAZ)	0	0
Mehdi Taghavi (IRI)	1	1

==== Section 4 ====
Round of 64
Yang Chun-song (PRK)	2	5	4
Heinrich Barnes (RSA)	3	0	0
Nikolay Kurtev (BUL)	1	1
Panagiotis Makrinas (GRE)	1	0

Round of 32
Haislan Garcia (CAN)	2	1	0
Muhammed İlkhan (TUR)	0	2	1
Shan Chengde (CHN)	1	0
Saba Bolaghi (GER)	2	1
Manfred Brötzner (AUT)	0	0
Pürevjavyn Önörbat (MGL)	1	4
Yang Chun-song (PRK)	2	1	3
Nikolay Kurtev (BUL)	1	1	0

Round of 16
Muhammed İlkhan (TUR)	2	2
Saba Bolaghi (GER)	0	0
Pürevjavyn Önörbat (MGL)	1	1
Yang Chun-song (PRK)	0	1

Quarterfinals
Muhammed İlkhan (TUR)	0	2	1
Pürevjavyn Önörbat (MGL)	1	0	0

=== Repechage ===
Repechage round 2
Jung Young-ho (KOR)	1	1
Adam Sobieraj (POL)	0	0
Shalva Abajevi (GEO)	4	3	1
Andriy Stadnik (UKR)	0	3	3

Repechage round 3
Jung Young-ho (KOR)	0	0
Tatsuhiro Yonemitsu (JPN)	3	2
Andriy Stadnik (UKR)	0	3
Leonid Spiridonov (KAZ)	8	4

Bronze medals
Tatsuhiro Yonemitsu (JPN)	1	4
Sushil Kumar (IND)	0	0
Leonid Spiridonov (KAZ)	1	1
Muhammed İlkhan (TUR)	0	0
