= 2013 World Wrestling Championships – Men's freestyle 66 kg =

Men's freestyle 66 kg at the 2013 World Championships
- Venue: László Papp Budapest Sports Arena
- Dates: 16 September 2013
- Competitors: 40 from 40 nations

Medalists
gold medal	David Safaryan	Armenia
silver medal	Liván López	Cuba
bronze medal	Magomed Kurbanaliev	Russia
bronze medal	Ganzorigiin Mandakhnaran	Mongolia

The men's freestyle 66 kilograms is a competition featured at the 2013 World Wrestling Championships, and was held at the László Papp Budapest Sports Arena in Budapest, Hungary on 16 September 2013.

== Results ==
Legend

- F — Won by fall

=== Finals ===
Semifinals		Final
David Safaryan (ARM)	6
Levan Kelekhsashvili (GEO)	5	David Safaryan (ARM)	2
Ganzorigiin Mandakhnaran (MGL)	6	Liván López (CUB)	2
Liván López (CUB)	6

=== Top half ===
==== Section 1 ====
Round of 64

Round of 32
George Bucur (ROU)	2
David Safaryan (ARM)	3
Jeffry Avila (DOM)	0
Rafał Statkiewicz (POL)	7
Steven Graf (SUI)	0
Yakup Gör (TUR)	8
Magomed Kurbanaliev (RUS)	7^{F}
Jung Young-ho (KOR)	2

Round of 16
David Safaryan (ARM)	7
Rafał Statkiewicz (POL)	0
Yakup Gör (TUR)	7
Magomed Kurbanaliev (RUS)	7

Quarterfinals
David Safaryan (ARM)	4
Magomed Kurbanaliev (RUS)	3

==== Section 2 ====
Round of 64

Round of 32
Mehdi Taghavi (IRI)	5
Brent Metcalf (USA)	2
Abdulrahman Ibrahim (QAT)	0
Aleksandr Kontoev (BLR)	7
Ayad Ibrahim (EGY)	7
Roshan Liyanage (SRI)	0
Arun Kumar (IND)	0
Levan Kelekhsashvili (GEO)	8

Round of 16
Mehdi Taghavi (IRI)	2
Aleksandr Kontoev (BLR)	3
Ayad Ibrahim (EGY)	1
Levan Kelekhsashvili (GEO)	8

Quarterfinals
Aleksandr Kontoev (BLR)	5
Levan Kelekhsashvili (GEO)	7

=== Bottom half ===
==== Section 3 ====
Round of 64

Round of 32
Andreas Triantafyllidis (GRE)	5
Hernán Guzmán (COL)	4
Ulukman Mamatov (KGZ)	7
Mihail Sava (MDA)	6
César Roberty (VEN)	1
Gergõ Wöller (HUN)	6
Ganzorigiin Mandakhnaran (MGL)	10
Semen Radulov (UKR)	4

Round of 16
Andreas Triantafyllidis (GRE)	6
Ulukman Mamatov (KGZ)	2
Gergõ Wöller (HUN)	2
Ganzorigiin Mandakhnaran (MGL)	9

Quarterfinals
Andreas Triantafyllidis (GRE)	3
Ganzorigiin Mandakhnaran (MGL)	11

==== Section 4 ====
Round of 64
Dejan Mitrov (MKD)	0
Ruslan Pliev (UZB)	7
Saba Bolaghi (GER)	8
Tapani Honkanen (FIN)	0
Haislan Garcia (CAN)	3
Aghahuseyn Mustafayev (AZE)	2
Dauren Zhumagaziyev (KAZ)	8
Zhang Jianfu (CHN)	0
Takahiro Inoue (JPN)	5
Borislav Novachkov (BUL)	5
Liván López (CUB)	8
Bùi Tuấn Anh (VIE)	0
Pedro Soto (PUR)	1
Kang Jin-hyok (PRK)	4
Peter Obžera (SVK)	1
Igor Gertner (ISR)	6

Round of 32
Ruslan Pliev (UZB)	8
Saba Bolaghi (GER)	11^{F}
Haislan Garcia (CAN)	3
Dauren Zhumagaziyev (KAZ)	2
Takahiro Inoue (JPN)	5
Liván López (CUB)	10
Kang Jin-hyok (PRK)	3
Igor Gertner (ISR)	2

Round of 16
Saba Bolaghi (GER)	1
Haislan Garcia (CAN)	4
Liván López (CUB)	6^{F}
Kang Jin-hyok (PRK)	6

Quarterfinals
Haislan Garcia (CAN)	0
Liván López (CUB)	1

=== Repechage ===
Repechage round 1
Bùi Tuấn Anh (VIE)	2
Takahiro Inoue (JPN)	9

Repechage round 2
George Bucur (ROU)	7
Rafał Statkiewicz (POL)	0
Takahiro Inoue (JPN)	0
Kang Jin-hyok (PRK)	7

Repechage round 3
George Bucur (ROU)	4
Magomed Kurbanaliev (RUS)	5
Kang Jin-hyok (PRK)	6
Haislan Garcia (CAN)	0

Bronze medals
Magomed Kurbanaliev (RUS)	7
Levan Kelekhsashvili (GEO)	5
Kang Jin-hyok (PRK)	1
Ganzorigiin Mandakhnaran (MGL)	3
