= Wrestling at the 2012 Summer Olympics – Men's freestyle 66 kg =

Men's freestyle 66 kg at the Games of the XXX Olympiad
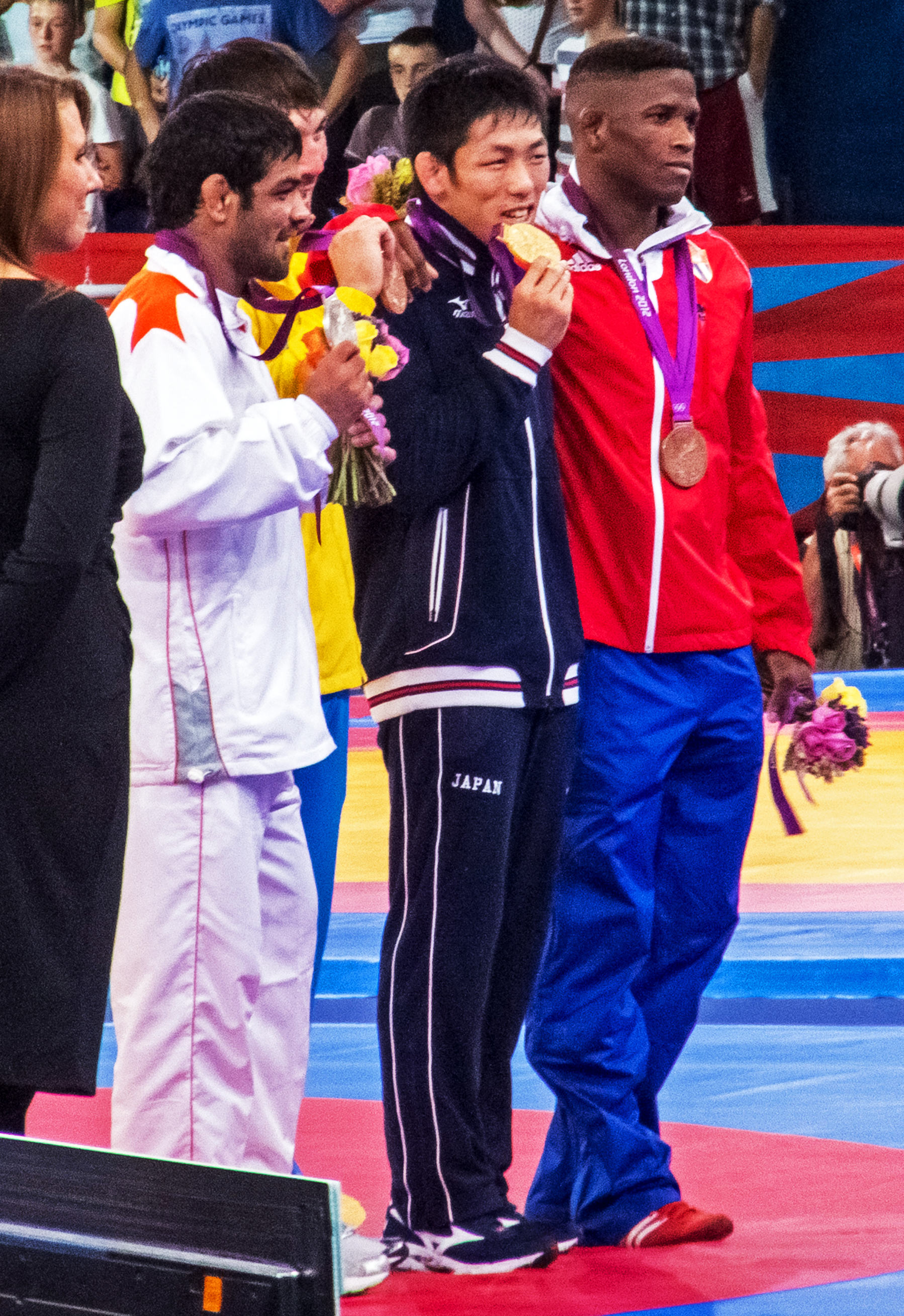
- Venue: ExCeL London
- Date: 12 August 2012
- Competitors: 19 from 19 nations

Medalists
1st place, gold medalist(s)		Tatsuhiro Yonemitsu	Japan
2nd place, silver medalist(s)		Sushil Kumar	India
3rd place, bronze medalist(s)		Akzhurek Tanatarov	Kazakhstan
3rd place, bronze medalist(s)		Liván López	Cuba

Men's freestyle 66 kilograms competition at the 2012 Summer Olympics in London, United Kingdom, took place on 12 August at ExCeL London. This freestyle wrestling competition consisted of a single-elimination tournament, with a repechage used to determine the winners of two bronze medals. The two finalists faced off for gold and silver medals. Each wrestler who lost to one of the two finalists moved into the repechage, culminating in a pair of bronze medal matches featuring the semifinal losers each facing the remaining repechage opponent from their half of the bracket.

Each bout consisted of up to three rounds, lasting two minutes apiece. The wrestler who scored more points in each round was the winner of that rounds; the bout finished when one wrestler had won two rounds (and thus the match).

== Schedule ==
All times are British Summer Time (UTC+01:00)

Date	Time	Event
12 August 2012	08:30	Qualification rounds
12 August 2012	12:45	Repechage
12 August 2012	13:45	Finals

== Results ==
Legend

- F — Won by fall
- WO — Won by walkover

=== Final ===
Final
Sushil Kumar (IND)	0	1
Tatsuhiro Yonemitsu (JPN)	1	3

=== Top half ===
Qualifications

1/8 finals
Abdou Omar (EGY)
David Safaryan (ARM)	W	O
Andriy Kviatkovskyi (UKR)	1	0
Akzhurek Tanatarov (KAZ)	1	1
Ikhtiyor Navruzov (UZB)	3	2
Otar Tushishvili (GEO)	1	1
Sushil Kumar (IND)	0	1	1
Ramazan Şahin (TUR)	2	0	0

1/4 finals
David Safaryan (ARM)	2	4	2
Akzhurek Tanatarov (KAZ)	3	1	2
Ikhtiyor Navruzov (UZB)	1	2	0
Sushil Kumar (IND)	3	1	2

Semifinals
Akzhurek Tanatarov (KAZ)	0	3	3
Sushil Kumar (IND)	3	0	6

=== Bottom half ===
Qualifications
Liván López (CUB)	1	0	5
Mehdi Taghavi (IRI)	0	1	0
Haithem Ben Alayech (TUN)
Haislan Garcia (CAN)	W	O
Zalimkhan Yusupov (TJK)	1	1
Alan Gogaev (RUS)	0	0

1/8 finals
Jared Frayer (USA)	0	0
Ali Shabanau (BLR)	3	1
Leonid Bazan (BUL)	0	1
Jabrayil Hasanov (AZE)	3	3
Tatsuhiro Yonemitsu (JPN)	1	1
Liván López (CUB)	0	1
Haislan Garcia (CAN)	2	0	2
Zalimkhan Yusupov (TJK)	0	2	0

1/4 finals
Ali Shabanau (BLR)	2	1	0
Jabrayil Hasanov (AZE)	2	1	2
Tatsuhiro Yonemitsu (JPN)	0	1	5
Haislan Garcia (CAN)	1	0	0

Semifinals
Jabrayil Hasanov (AZE)	0	0
Tatsuhiro Yonemitsu (JPN)	2	1

=== Repechage ===
Repechage round 2
Ramazan Şahin (TUR)	3	3
Ikhtiyor Navruzov (UZB)	0	1
Liván López (CUB)	1	0	1
Haislan Garcia (CAN)	0	1	0

Bronze medals
Ramazan Şahin (TUR)	4	1	2
Akzhurek Tanatarov (KAZ)	1	3	4
Liván López (CUB)	0	2	5^{F}
Jabrayil Hasanov (AZE)	3	0	1

== Final standing ==
Rank	Athlete
1st place, gold medalist(s)	Tatsuhiro Yonemitsu (JPN)
2nd place, silver medalist(s)	Sushil Kumar (IND)
3rd place, bronze medalist(s)	Akzhurek Tanatarov (KAZ)
3rd place, bronze medalist(s)	Liván López (CUB)
5	Ramazan Şahin (TUR)
5	Jabrayil Hasanov (AZE)
7	Haislan Garcia (CAN)
8	David Safaryan (ARM)
9	Ikhtiyor Navruzov (UZB)
10	Ali Shabanau (BLR)
11	Zalimkhan Yusupov (TJK)
12	Otar Tushishvili (GEO)
13	Andriy Kviatkovskyi (UKR)
14	Mehdi Taghavi (IRI)
14	Leonid Bazan (BUL)
16	Alan Gogaev (RUS)
17	Jared Frayer (USA)
18	Haithem Ben Alayech (TUN)
18	Abdou Omar (EGY)
