= Wrestling at the 2010 Asian Games – Men's freestyle 66 kg =

Men's freestyle 66 kg at the 2010 Asian Games
- Venue: Huagong Gymnasium
- Date: 24 November 2010
- Competitors: 16 from 16 nations

Medalists
gold medal	Tatsuhiro Yonemitsu	Japan
silver medal	Mehdi Taghavi	Iran
bronze medal	Yang Chun-song	North Korea
bronze medal	Leonid Spiridonov	Kazakhstan

The men's freestyle 66 kilograms wrestling competition at the 2010 Asian Games in Guangzhou was held on 24 November 2010 at the Huagong Gymnasium.

This freestyle wrestling competition consisted of a single-elimination tournament, with a repechage used to determine the winner of two bronze medals. The two finalists faced off for gold and silver medals. Each wrestler who lost to one of the two finalists moved into the repechage, culminating in a pair of bronze medal matches featuring the semifinal losers each facing the remaining repechage opponent from their half of the bracket.

Each bout consisted of up to three rounds, lasting two minutes apiece. The wrestler who scored more points in each round was the winner of that rounds; the bout finished when one wrestler had won two rounds (and thus the match).

== Schedule ==
All times are China Standard Time (UTC+08:00)

Date	Time	Event
Wednesday, 24 November 2010	09:30	1/8 finals
Wednesday, 24 November 2010	09:30	Quarterfinals
Wednesday, 24 November 2010	09:30	Semifinals
Wednesday, 24 November 2010	16:00	Repechages
Wednesday, 24 November 2010	17:00	Finals

== Results ==
Legend

- F — Won by fall

=== Main bracket ===
1/8 finals
Pradeep Kumar (IND)	2^{F}
Mustafa Al-Haimi (YEM)	0
Azat Donbaev (KGZ)	1	0
Tatsuhiro Yonemitsu (JPN)	2	1
Pürevjavyn Önörbat (MGL)	1	4
Mohammad Shaikhouni (SYR)	0	1
Yang Chun-song (PRK)	1	1
Kim Dai-sung (KOR)	0	0
Seýitnur Ataýew (TKM)	6	4
Jimmy Angana (PHI)	0	1
Ikhtiyor Navruzov (UZB)	5	6
Abdulqader Omar (QAT)	0	0
Leonid Spiridonov (KAZ)	2	0	0
Mehdi Taghavi (IRI)	0	1	2
Shan Chengde (CHN)	3	1
Muhammad Ali (PAK)	0	0

Quarterfinals
Pradeep Kumar (IND)	0	0
Tatsuhiro Yonemitsu (JPN)	3	3
Pürevjavyn Önörbat (MGL)	4	0	1
Yang Chun-song (PRK)	0	1	4
Seýitnur Ataýew (TKM)	0	0
Ikhtiyor Navruzov (UZB)	7	7
Mehdi Taghavi (IRI)	3	4
Shan Chengde (CHN)	1	0

Semifinals
Tatsuhiro Yonemitsu (JPN)	0	3	2
Yang Chun-song (PRK)	1	0	0
Ikhtiyor Navruzov (UZB)	0	0
Mehdi Taghavi (IRI)	2	2

Final
Tatsuhiro Yonemitsu (JPN)	1	2
Mehdi Taghavi (IRI)	0	1

=== Repechage ===
Repechage round 1
Azat Donbaev (KGZ)	0	1
Pradeep Kumar (IND)	1	1
Leonid Spiridonov (KAZ)	3	2
Shan Chengde (CHN)	0	0

Bronze medals
Pradeep Kumar (IND)	1	0	0
Yang Chun-song (PRK)	0	1	2
Leonid Spiridonov (KAZ)	1	2
Ikhtiyor Navruzov (UZB)	0	0

== Final standing ==
Rank	Athlete
1st place, gold medalist(s)	Tatsuhiro Yonemitsu (JPN)
2nd place, silver medalist(s)	Mehdi Taghavi (IRI)
3rd place, bronze medalist(s)	Yang Chun-song (PRK)
3rd place, bronze medalist(s)	Leonid Spiridonov (KAZ)
5	Pradeep Kumar (IND)
5	Ikhtiyor Navruzov (UZB)
7	Pürevjavyn Önörbat (MGL)
8	Shan Chengde (CHN)
9	Seýitnur Ataýew (TKM)
10	Azat Donbaev (KGZ)
11	Mohammad Shaikouni (SYR)
12	Jimmy Angana (PHI)
13	Mustafa Al-Haimi (YEM)
13	Kim Dai-sung (KOR)
15	Muhammad Ali (PAK)
16	Abdulqader Omar (QAT)
