= Teyon Ware =

American amateur wrestler (born 1983)

Personal information
- Born: August 13, 1983 (age 42) Oklahoma City, Oklahoma, U.S.
- Weight: 145.5 lb (66 kg)

Sport
- Sport: Wrestling
- Events: Freestyle and Folkstyle
- College team: Oklahoma Sooners
- Club: Wyoming Cowboys
Medal record
Men's freestyle wrestling
Representing the United States
Pan American Games
Bronze medal – third place	2011 Guadalajara	66 kg
Men's collegiate wrestling
Representing the Oklahoma Sooners
NCAA Division I Championships
Gold medal – first place	2003 Kansas City	141 lb
Gold medal – first place	2005 St. Louis	141 lb
Silver medal – second place	2006 Oklahoma City	141 lb

Teyon Ware (born August 13, 1983) is an American former freestyle and folkstyle wrestler. Competing for the Oklahoma Sooners, Ware won NCAA Division I wrestling titles at 141 pounds in 2003 and 2005. Ware is a 4-time All-American, former Big 12 Conference champion, and U.S. World Team member that competed at the 2011 World Wrestling Championships.

== Early life ==
Ware attended Edmond North High School in Edmond, Oklahoma. In high school, Ware was a letterman in football and wrestling. In wrestling, he won four Oklahoma state championships and compiled a perfect 132-0 record and was named the Junior Hodge Trophy winner for 2002. In football, he won All-District honors and second team All-State honors. He was also Homecoming King his senior year.

== College career ==
Teyon attended the University of Oklahoma on a full ride wrestling scholarship. He won a national championship his freshmen year, took sixth place his sophomore year, won his junior year and placed second his senior year. He graduated in May 2007 with a Mass Communications degree.

== International career ==
Ware represented Team USA at the 2011 World Wrestling Championships in freestyle at 66 kg, where he lost to Andriy Stadnik of Ukraine 2-1, 4-0.

== Coaching career ==
On July 15, 2015, it was announced that Ware would join the University of Wyoming's coaching staff.

== Personal life ==
Ware married Shea Nicole McMullin on July 26, 2014.
