= 2013 European Wrestling Championships – Men's freestyle 74 kg =

The men's freestyle 74 kg is a competition featured at the 2013 European Wrestling Championships and was held at the Tbilisi Sports Palace in Tbilisi, Georgia on 21 March 2013.

== Medalists ==
Gold	Aniuar Geduev; Russia
Silver	Gábor Hatos; Hungary
Bronze	Giya Chykhladze; Ukraine
Bronze	Leonid Bazan; Bulgaria

== Results ==
Legend

- F — Won by fall

=== Final ===
Final
Gábor Hatos (HUN)	1	0
Aniuar Geduev (RUS)	1	1

=== Top Half ===
Round of 32

Round of 16
Gábor Hatos (HUN)	3	3
Gurgen Baghdasarjan (CZE)	0	0
Andrea Sorbello (ITA)	0	0
Zaur Efendiev (SRB)	7	4
Ali Shabanau (BLR)	0	1	3
Soner Demirtaş (TUR)	1	0	0
Giya Chykhladze (UKR)	2	2
Ahmed Dudarov (GER)	1	0

Quarterfinals
Gábor Hatos (HUN)	3	6
Zaur Efendiev (SRB)	0	1
Ali Shabanau (BLR)	1	0	1
Giya Chykhladze (UKR)	0	3	1

Semifinals
Gábor Hatos (HUN)	0	2	8
Giya Chykhladze (UKR)	1	0	0

=== Bottom Half ===
Round of 32
Apostolos Taskoudis (GRE)	4	4
Beka Namitcheishvili (ISR)	0	0
Philipp Crepaz (AUT)	0	0
Davit Khutsishvili (GEO)	1	3
Tomasz Rogisz (POL)	0	0
Aniuar Geduev (RUS)	2	7
Marius Atofani (ROU)	1	1
Luca Lampis (FRA)	0	0
Leonid Bazan (BUL)	2	0	1
Aleksandr Gostiyev (AZE)	0	1	0

Round of 16
Dan Pálinkás (SVK)	0	0
Alexandru Burcă (MDA)	1	1
Grigor Grigoryan (ARM)	4	5
Apostolos Taskoudis (GRE)	2	1
Davit Khutsishvili (GEO)	0	0
Aniuar Geduev (RUS)	1	7
Marius Atofani (ROU)	1	2	0
Leonid Bazan (BUL)	0	3	1

Quarterfinals
Alexandru Burcă (MDA)	0	0
Grigor Grigoryan (ARM)	1	5
Aniuar Geduev (RUS)	1	3
Leonid Bazan (BUL)	0	0

Semifinals
Grigor Grigoryan (ARM)	0	0
Aniuar Geduev (RUS)	7	6

=== Repechage ===
Repechage round 1
Tomasz Rogisz (POL)	3	1	0
Davit Khutsishvili (GEO)	3	1	1

Repechage round 2
Gurgen Baghdasarjan (CZE)	0
Zaur Efendiev (SRB)	4^{F}
Davit Khutsishvili (GEO)	1	0
Leonid Bazan (BUL)	1	7

Bronze medals
Zaur Efendiev (SRB)	0	3	0
Giya Chykhladze (UKR)	1	0	6
Leonid Bazan (BUL)	2	4
Grigor Grigoryan (ARM)	1	0
