= 2013 European Wrestling Championships – Men's freestyle 66 kg =

The men's freestyle 66 kg is a competition featured at the 2013 European Wrestling Championships, and was held at the Tbilisi Sports Palace in Tbilisi, Georgia on 19 March 2013.

== Medalists ==
Gold	David Safaryan; Armenia
Silver	Yakup Gör; Turkey
Bronze	Aleksandr Kontoev; Belarus
Bronze	Ilyas Bekbulatov; Russia

== Results ==
Legend

- C — Won by 3 cautions given to the opponent
- F — Won by fall

=== Final ===
Final
David Safaryan (ARM)	1	1
Yakup Gör (TUR)	0	0

=== Top Half ===
Round of 32

Round of 16
Norbert Lukács (HUN)	2	4	1
Steven Graf (SUI)	3	0	1
Igor Gertner (ISR)	0	3
Mihai Sava (MDA)	1	6^{F}
David Safaryan (ARM)	3	2
Maxime Fiquet (FRA)	0	1
Aleksandr Kontoev (BLR)	2	0	1
Martin Daum (GER)	0	1	0

Quarterfinals
Norbert Lukács (HUN)	0	0
Mihai Sava (MDA)	3	3
David Safaryan (ARM)	0	1	1
Aleksandr Kontoev (BLR)	2	0	0

Semifinals
Mihai Sava (MDA)	1	0
David Safaryan (ARM)	3	7

=== Bottom Half ===
Round of 32
Nikolay Kurtev (BUL)	3	1
Petteri Martikainen (FIN)	2	0
Andriy Kvyatkovskyy (UKR)	1	0	1
Ilyas Bekbulatov (RUS)	0	4	4
Vilson Ndregjoni (ALB)	0	0
Konstantine Khabalashvili (GEO)	4	2
Andreas Triantafyllidis (GRE)	0	0
Rafał Statkiewicz (POL)	1	2^{C}
Magomed Muslimov (AZE)	4	6
Angelo Costa (ITA)	0	0

Round of 16
Dejan Mitrov (MKD)	0	1
Yakup Gör (TUR)	3	1
Adrian Moise (ROU)	0	1	2
Nikolay Kurtev (BUL)	2	0	0
Ilyas Bekbulatov (RUS)	4	1
Konstantine Khabalashvili (GEO)	1	0
Rafał Statkiewicz (POL)	1	0
Magomed Muslimov (AZE)	4	2

Quarterfinals
Yakup Gör (TUR)	1	2
Adrian Moise (ROU)	0	0
Ilyas Bekbulatov (RUS)	0	1	2
Magomed Muslimov (AZE)	4	0	0

Semifinals
Yakup Gör (TUR)	1	0	3
Ilyas Bekbulatov (RUS)	0	1	0

=== Repechage ===
Repechage round 2
Maxime Fiquet (FRA)	0	0
Aleksandr Kontoev (BLR)	1	3
Dejan Mitrov (MKD)	1	1
Adrian Moise (ROU)	1	2

Bronze medals
Aleksandr Kontoev (BLR)	2	7
Mihai Sava (MDA)	0	0
Adrian Moise (ROU)	0	0
Ilyas Bekbulatov (RUS)	1	3
