= Countryside High School =

Public high school in Clearwater, Florida

Coordinates: 28.023285°N 82.711387°W

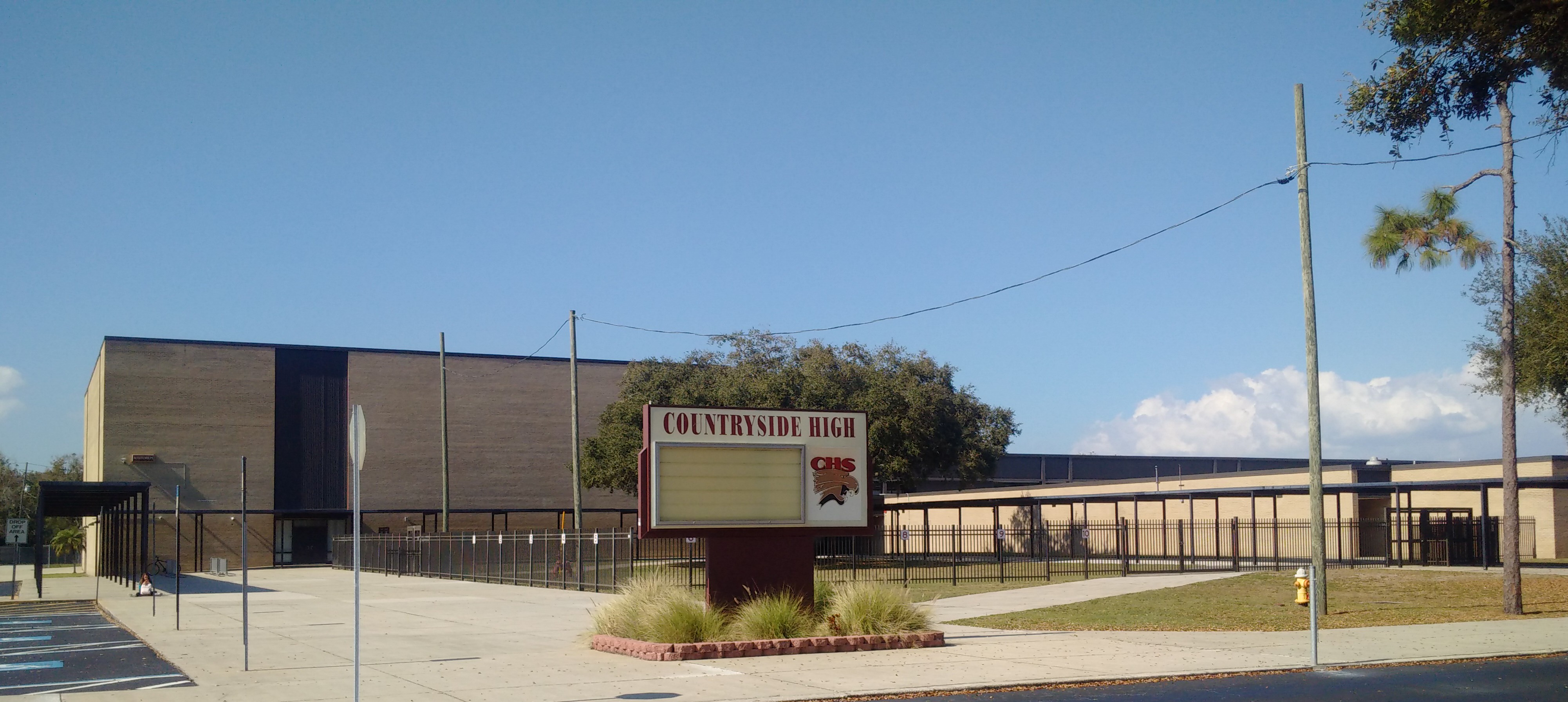
- 3000 State Road 580; Clearwater, Florida 33761; United States

Information
- Type: Public high school
- Established: 1980
- School district: Pinellas County Schools
- Principal: Taylor K. Henderson, Sr.
- Teaching staff: 83.00 (FTE)
- Enrollment: 1,741 (2022-2023)
- Student to teacher ratio: 20.98
- Mascot: Cougar
- Newspaper: Paw Print Newspaper
- Yearbook: The Pride
- Colors: Garnet and Gold
- Website: https://countryside-hs.pcsb.org/

Countryside High School, also known as CHS, is a public high school located in Clearwater, Florida. Established in 1980, it is a part of the Pinellas County Schools system, and is one of the larger schools in Pinellas County. It draws students from Dunedin, suburban east Clearwater, Safety Harbor, and Oldsmar.

Countryside High School is one of the largest and most prestigious schools in the Pinellas County School system.

== History ==
The school's first graduating class in 1980 finished before the school was completed and held classes and graduation at Dunedin High School.

Countryside High School's Battle of the Books Team took First Place in the Battle of the Books for three years running, beginning in 2010.

In 2022 a resurfaced outside facade and a new mall floor design were built.

== Academics ==
The school offers numerous advanced academic programs and recognition, including foreign languages and technology honor societies along with ISTEM (institute of science, technology, engineering and mathematics), and CCT (Center for Computer Technologies). The Winter guard is the Scholastic Class A Florida Federation of Color guard Circuit (FFCC) state champions and the scholastic class A Winter Guard International bronze medalists in 2006.

The school won the first high school "Battle of the Books" competition in 2006, repeating the feat again in 2007, 2008, 2011, 2012, 2013, 2015.

The school newspaper, Paw Print, has received an All Florida Rating from the Florida Scholastic Press Association; a Superior from the Southern Interscholastic Press Association and an International Second Place Award from Quill and Scroll.

The UPC Morning Show (Upper Pinellas County) televised newscast began in 1987, and has since grown to an award-winning, student-produced daily 8-minute news show. Both the Paw Print newspaper and the UPC Morning Show can be seen online.

== Student life ==
=== Clubs ===
CHS offers a variety of clubs (over 25) for student development involvement.

=== Theater ===
Countryside has a notable Drama program winning many statewide awards. It has consistently been one of the highest performing schools in Florida.

In 2007–2008, the musical Honk, an adaptation of the Ugly Duckling, was selected to be performed as a Mainstage show at the Florida State Thespian Festival on May 1, 2008. It was one of six chosen from a group of 35 shows in Florida. Other shows done by CHS include Li'l Abner. The Foreigner, West Side Story, and Steel Magnolias.

In 2011–2012, their production of Return to the Forbidden Planet was also selected to be performed as a Mainstage show.

In 2015–2016, their one act A... My Name Is Alice received a superior rating and was selected to represent their district and perform at the Florida State Thespian Festival

Thespian Troupe 900 is responsible for many outdoor performances among the combined rock band, choir, and musical theater groups on campus.

=== Sports ===
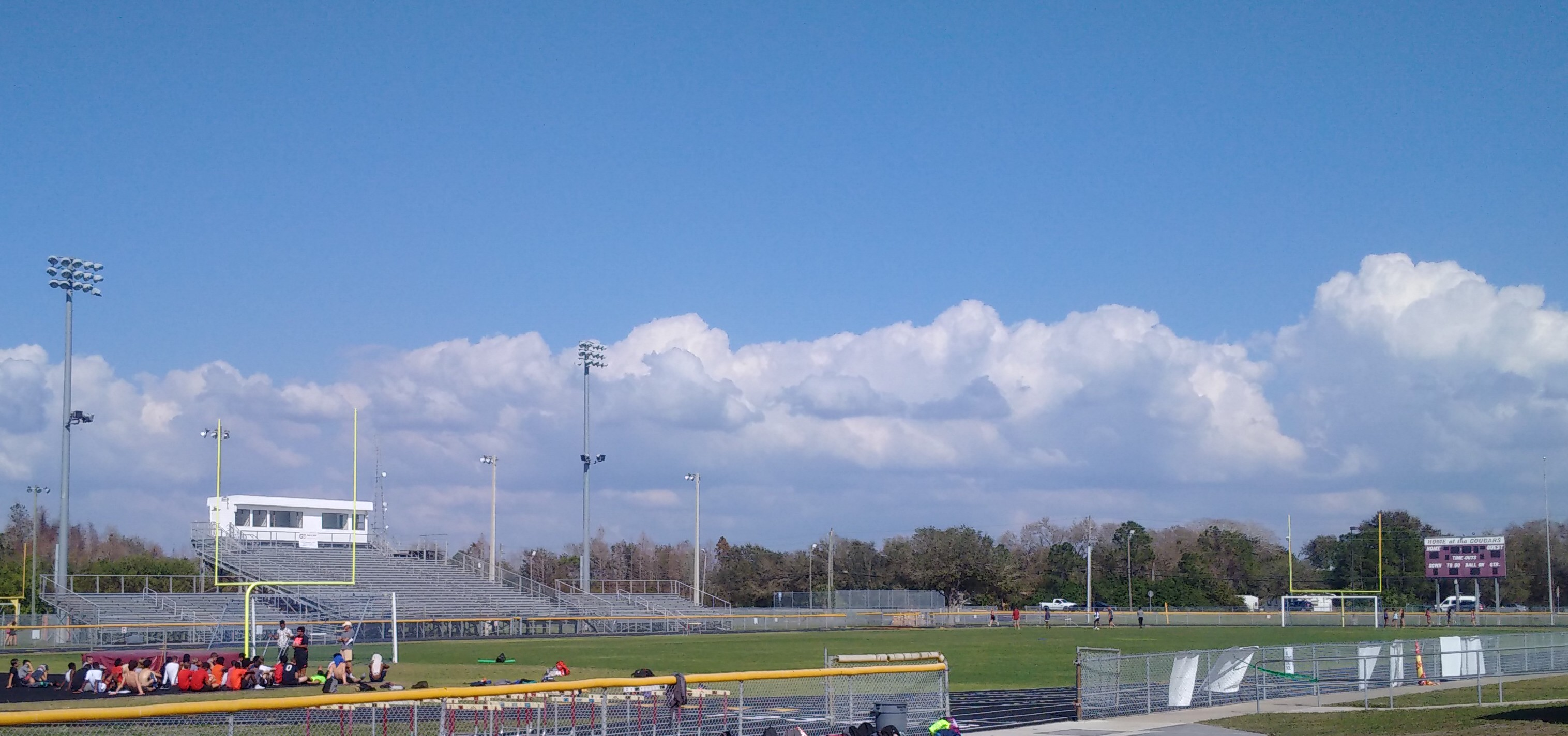
The school's athletic fields and grandstand

Countryside won the 1985 4A FHSAA State Meet. Countryside won the 2006 State Championship for class 6A boys soccer.

The school offers many sports for boys and girls, including football, basketball, track, and many others.

=== Marching band ===
- 2006 Plaformed at the NFL Experience Fan Fest for the presentation of the Lombardi Trophy.
- 2009 Field show Grand Champions at the Chick-Fil-A Bowl. Performed with the ced 4th in the Class 3A Florida Marching Band Coalition's State Championships at Tropicana Field, St. Petersburg, Florida.
- 2006 Cotton Bowl Classic field show Grand Champions and 1st runner-up in the parade competition for the 2006 Cotton Bowl Classic in Dallas, Texas. Performed with the mass band performance at Pre-Game and Halftime.
- 2009 Invited to play at the 2009 Super Bowl in Tampa, Florida where they permass band for Pre-Game and Halftime.
- 2010 Placed 4th and received the Best Visual Performance in the Class 1A Florida Marching Band Coalition's State Championships at Tropicana Field, St. Petersburg, florida.

== Notable alumni ==
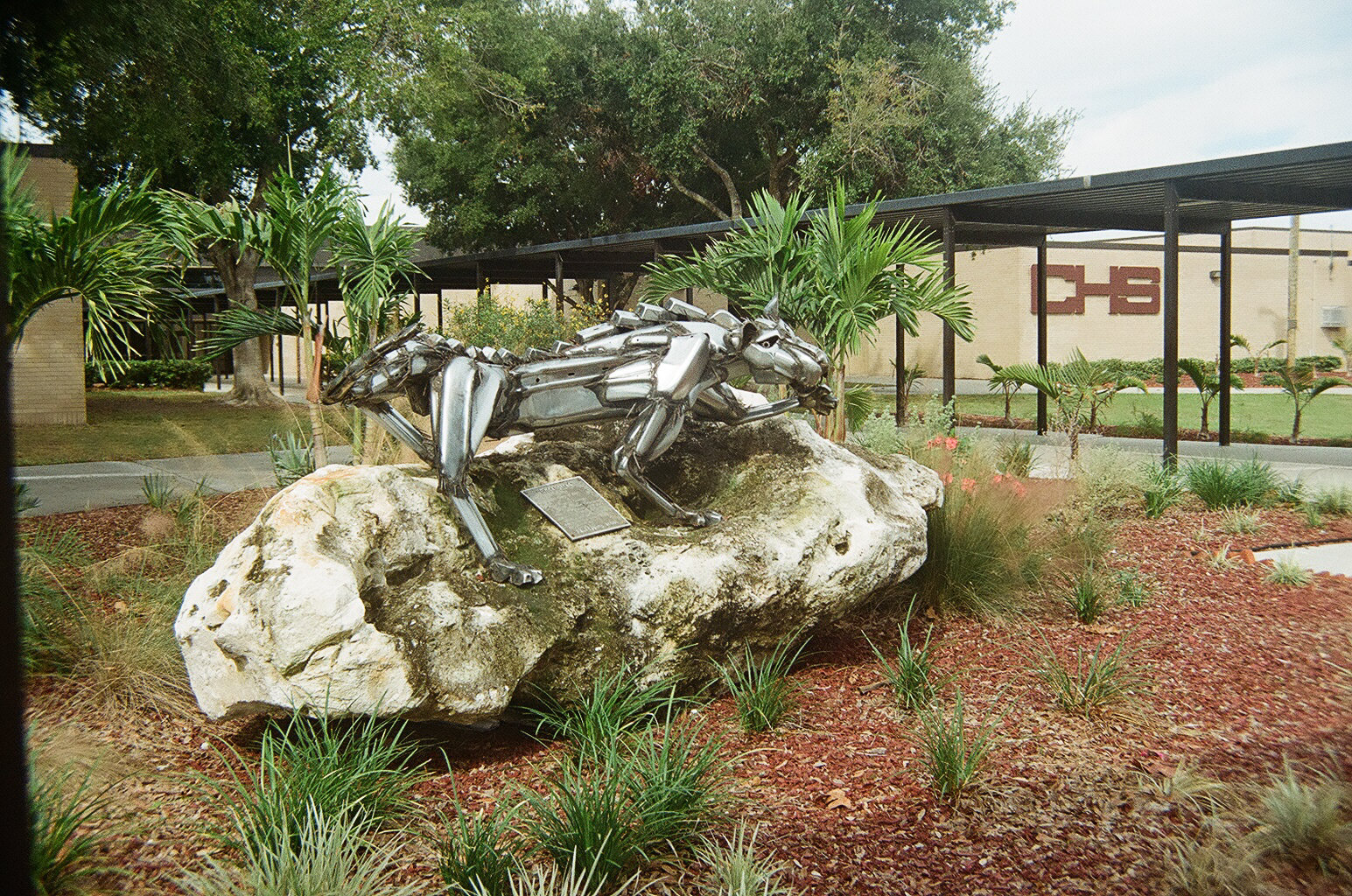
Countryside High School sculpture, from Class of 1992

- AJ Andrews, softball player
- David Blue, actor
- Keith Boykin, author and broadcaster
- Vic Carrapazza, baseball umpire
- Andrew DeClercq, (1991), basketball player
- Bobby Finke, 3x Olympic Gold Medalist in swimming and 1500m freestyle world record holder.
- Jared Frayer, 2012 Olympic freestyle wrestler
- Matt Geiger (1987) basketball player
- Ira Heiden, actor
- Agim Kaba, actor
- Mike Love, American football defensive end
- Adam Lowitt, comedian
- Melanie Margalis, Olympic swimmer
- Jeff Mitchell, American football offensive lineman
- Tyler Moore, American football offensive lineman
- Stephanie Moulton Sarkis, psychotherapist and author
- Eliot Schrefer, author
- George Tsamis, baseball pitcher
