= Mike Love (American football) =

American football player (born 1994)

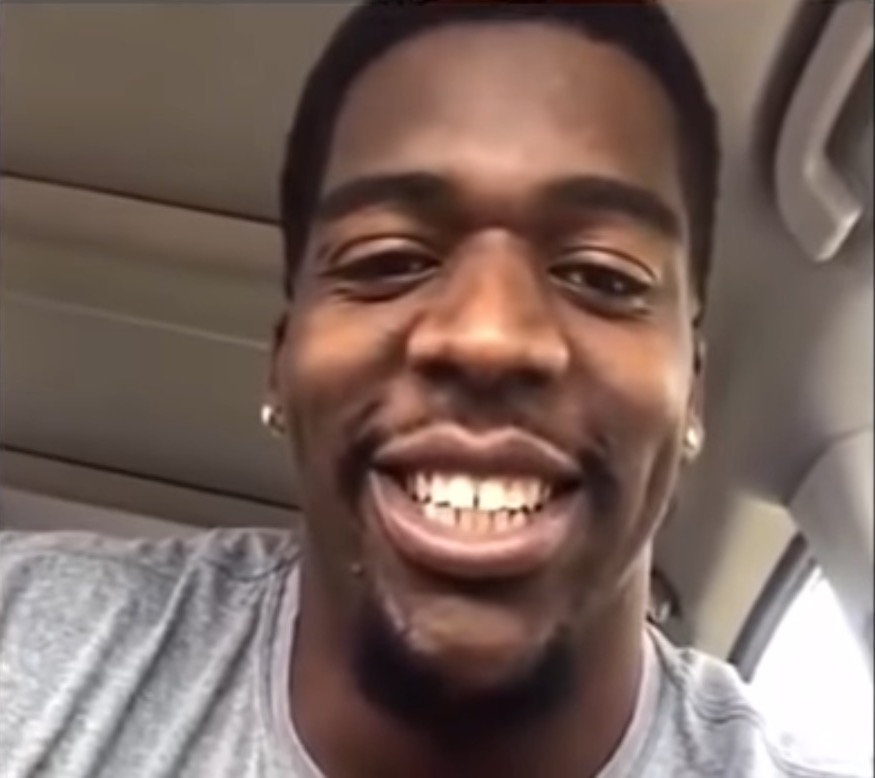
- Love in 2019

Profile
- Position: Defensive end

Personal information
- Born: January 22, 1994 (age 32); Clearwater, Florida, U.S.
- Listed height: 6 ft 3 in (1.91 m)
- Listed weight: 255 lb (116 kg)

Career information
- High school: Countryside (Clearwater)
- College: South Florida
- NFL draft: 2018: undrafted

Career history
- Buffalo Bills (2018–2022)

Career NFL statistics
- Total tackles: 7
- Stats at Pro Football Reference

Mike Love (born January 22, 1994) is an American former professional football player who was a defensive end in the National Football League (NFL). He played college football for the South Florida Bulls. He was signed by the Buffalo Bills in 2018 as an undrafted free agent.

== Early life ==
Love was born and raised in Clearwater, Florida and attended Countryside High School. Love was a standout defensive end for the Cougars and was rated a three-star prospect by several recruiting services, but lost interest from many high-profile programs due to academic struggles. He ultimately committed to play college football for the nearby University of South Florida (USF) over offers from Arizona, Indiana, Iowa State, Louisville, Mississippi State, North Carolina State, and West Virginia, among others.

== College career ==
Love spent five years at South Florida, redshirting his freshman year after suffering a knee injury early in the season. After missing most of his redshirt freshman season due to injury, Love became a regular starter for the Bulls during his redshirt junior season, registering 27 tackles and three sacks. In his final season, Love set career highs with 28 tackles, 10.5 tackles for loss, five sacks, and three passes defended. He finished his collegiate career with 64 tackles, 18.5 for a loss, and 8.5 sacks with one forced fumble in 32 games. Love graduated from USF with a bachelor's degree in criminology in 2016 and a master's in entrepreneurship in 2018.

== Professional career ==
Love signed with the Buffalo Bills as an undrafted free agent on April 28, 2018. He was cut by the team at the end of training camp and subsequently re-signed to the team's practice squad on September 2, 2018. Love was promoted from the practice squad to the Bills' active roster on December 5, 2018. Love made his NFL debut on December 16, 2018 in a 14-13 win against the Detroit Lions, recording one tackle. Love played in three games with five tackles in his rookie season.

On August 28, 2019, Love was placed on injured reserve.

On September 5, 2020, Love was waived by the Bills and signed to the practice squad the next day. He was elevated to the active roster on January 2, 2021, for the team's week 17 game against the Miami Dolphins, and reverted to the practice squad after the game. On January 26, 2021, Love signed a reserves/futures contract with the Bills.

On August 31, 2021, Love was waived by the Bills and re-signed to the practice squad the next day. After the Bills were eliminated in the Divisional Round of the 2021 playoffs, he signed a reserve/future contract on January 24, 2022.

On August 30, 2022, Love was waived by the Bills and signed to the practice squad the next day.
