= Wrestling at the 2015 Pan American Games – Men's freestyle 65 kg =

Men's Freestyle 65 kg at the 2015 Pan American Games
- Venue: Mississauga Sports Centre
- Dates: July 17
- Competitors: 9 from 9 nations

Medalists
Gold medal	Brent Metcalf	United States
Silver medal	Franklin Marén	Cuba
Bronze medal	Haislan Garcia	Canada
Bronze medal	Franklin Gómez	Puerto Rico

The men's freestyle 65 kg competition of the Wrestling events at the 2015 Pan American Games in Toronto were held on July 17 at the Mississauga Sports Centre.

== Schedule ==
All times are Eastern Daylight Time (UTC-4).

Date	Time	Round
July 17, 2015	14:35	1/8 finals
July 17, 2015	15:56	Quarterfinals
July 17, 2015	16:50	Semifinals
July 17, 2015	22:15	Bronze medal matches
July 17, 2015	22:33	Final

== Results ==
=== Final ===
Qualifications
Luis Portillo (ESA)	10
Alberto Mendieta (NCA)	0

Quarterfinals
Wilfredo Henriquez (VEN)	0
Franklin Gómez (PUR)	10
Brent Metcalf (USA)	10
Marbin Miranda (GUA)	0
Hernan Guzman (COL)	0
Franklin Marén (CUB)	12
Haislan Garcia (CAN)	8
Luis Portillo (ESA)	0

Semifinals
Franklin Gómez (PUR)	8
Brent Metcalf (USA)	10
Franklin Marén (CUB)	2
Haislan Garcia (CAN)	0

Finals
Brent Metcalf (USA)	8
Franklin Marén (CUB)	2

=== Repechage ===
Repechage round 2
Bye
Marbin Miranda (GUA)
Bye
Hernan Guzman (COL)

Bronze medal match
Marbin Miranda (GUA)	0
Franklin Gómez (PUR)	10
Hernan Guzman (COL)	0
Haislan Garcia (CAN)	2
