= Jared Frayer =

American wrestler (born 1978)

Personal information
- Born: October 7, 1978 (age 48) Miami, Florida, U.S.
- Home town: Clearwater, Florida, U.S.

Sport
- Country: United States
- Sport: Wrestling
- Events: Freestyle and Folkstyle
- College team: Oklahoma
- Team: USA
Medal record
Men's freestyle wrestling
Representing the United States
Cerro Pelado International
Silver medal – second place	2012 Habana	66 kg
Sunkist Kids International Open
Gold medal – first place	2011 Phoenix	66 kg
Dave Schultz Memorial
Gold medal – first place	2002 Colorado Springs	66 kg
Bronze medal – third place	2006 Colorado Springs	66 kg
Men's collegiate wrestling
Representing the Oklahoma Sooners
NCAA Division I Championships
Silver medal – second place	2002 Albany	149 lb

Jared Frayer (born October 7, 1978) of Miami, Florida is an American former freestyle wrestler. He won the 2012 U.S. Olympic Trials at 66 kg and competed at the 2012 Summer Olympics.

== Early life ==
Frayer was born in Miami, Florida, but grew up in Clearwater, Florida, where his father coached at Clearwater Countryside High School. He was a three-time Florida wrestling state champion.

== College career ==
Frayer was a two-time NCAA All-American at the University of Oklahoma, finishing as the NCAA runner-up at 149 lbs his senior year. He has since been an assistant wrestling coach with the Virginia Tech Hokies.

== International career ==
Frayer defeated Brent Metcalf 2-0 in the final of the 2012 U.S. Olympic Trials to qualify for the USA Olympic Team. At the 2012 Olympics, Frayer made it to the round of 16, where he lost to Ali Shabanau of Belarus.

In 2023, Frayer was inducted into the Florida chapter of the National Wrestling Hall of Fame.
