= Tyler Moore (American football) =

American football player (born 1993)

No. 73
- Position: Offensive guard

Personal information
- Born: January 3, 1993 (age 33); Palm Harbor, Florida, U.S.
- Listed height: 6 ft 6 in (1.98 m)
- Listed weight: 325 lb (147 kg)

Career information
- High school: Clearwater (FL) Countryside
- College: Florida
- NFL draft: 2015: undrafted

Career history
- Tampa Bay Storm (2015–2016); Chicago Bears (2015)*
- * Offseason or practice squad member only

Career AFL statistics
- Total tackles: 1
- Stats at ArenaFan.com

Tyler Moore (born January 3, 1993) is an American former football offensive guard. He played college football for the Florida Gators. He played in the 2011 U.S. Army All-American Bowl. He played high school football for Countryside High School.

== Professional career ==
Pre-draft measurables
Height	Weight	Arm length	Hand span	Wingspan	40-yard dash	10-yard split	20-yard split	20-yard shuttle	Three-cone drill	Vertical jump	Broad jump	Bench press
6 ft 5 5/8 in (1.97 m)	324 lb (147 kg)	33 1/4 in (0.84 m)	9 1/4 in (0.23 m)	6 ft 4 7/8 in (1.95 m)	5.59 s	1.95 s	3.15 s	4.84 s	7.81 s	26.0 in (0.66 m)	8 ft 2 in (2.49 m)	22 reps
All values from Pro Day

=== Tampa Bay Storm ===
Moore was assigned to the Tampa Bay Storm on June 2, 2015. On April 29, 2016, Moore was placed on reassignment. On May 4, 2016, Moore was assigned to the Storm again. On May 9, 2016, he placed on reassignment. On May 18, 2016, he was assigned to the Tampa Bay Storm. On May 21, 2016, he was placed on reassignment.

=== Chicago Bears ===
On July 31, 2015, Moore was signed by the Chicago Bears. On September 5, 2015, he was released by the Bears.
