= Edmond North High School =

Coordinates: 35.669057°N 97.484872°W

- 215 West Danforth; Edmond, Oklahoma 73003; United States

Information
- Type: Public high school
- Established: 1994 (Previously known as Edmond Mid-High until 1993)
- Principal: Rich Inga
- Teaching staff: 124.91 (on FTE basis)
- Enrollment: 2,532 (as of 2023-2024)
- Student to teacher ratio: 20.27
- Colors: Silver, white and navy
- Athletics conference: Metro Athletics Conference
- Mascot: Siberian Husky
- Website: School website

Edmond North High School is located in Edmond, Oklahoma. The school colors are silver, white and navy. The school's mascot is the Siberian Husky.

As of the 2012–2013 school year, the school had an enrollment of 2,437 students and 127 classroom teachers (on a FTE basis, for a student-teacher ratio of 27:1.

== Edmond North history ==
Edmond North High School (previously Edmond North Mid-High serving ninth & tenth grades only) became a four-year high school on May 2, 1993 by adding, respectively, eleventh and then twelfth grades. The rapid growth of the community in the early and mid-1990s prompted the decision to increase the number of high schools in the district. This allowed for expansion of the school's main building as well as the size and variety of available classes.

The initial graduating class was formed in 1994 and would graduate as the 1st class in May 1995. 1994 was the first year they hosted summer school. Edmond Memorial had previously been host, and with a second high school available, a rotation began between the two high schools and would later include Edmond Santa Fe High School which formed in 1993.

Community expansion continued through the '90s and into the 2000s, prompting Edmond North to further expand the main building. Additional portable classrooms were added, more parking became available, and a track, full size football field and tennis courts were also added.

== Awards and recognition ==
During the 2007–08 school year, Edmond North School was recognized with the Blue Ribbon School Award of Excellence by the United States Department of Education, the highest award an American school can receive.

== Sports programs ==
Edmond North competes in class 6A athletically and is a part of the Central Oklahoma Athletics Conference.

=== Men ===
- Baseball
- Basketball
- Bowling
- Cross country
- Football
- Golf
- Soccer
- Swimming
- Tennis
- Track and field
- Wrestling

=== Women ===
- Basketball
- Bowling
- Cross country
- Golf
- Soccer
- Softball
- Swimming
- Tennis
- Track and field
- Volleyball
- Pom
- Cheer

== Notable alumni ==
- Matt Donovan
- Kelly Gregg (1976–), nose tackle for the Baltimore Ravens
- Shannon Miller (1977–), Olympic gymnast; silver and bronze medalist at the 1992 Olympics and gold medalist at the 1996 Olympics
- Teyon Ware (1983–), American amateur wrestler
- Bright Dike (1987–), professional soccer player for the Portland Timbers
- Robert Streb (1987–), winner of the 2014 and 2020 RSM Classic on the PGA Tour
- Kevin Tway (1988–), winner of 2018 Safeway Open on the PGA Tour and the 2005 U.S. Junior Amateur Golf Championship
- Mookie Salaam (1990–), American track athlete
- Courtney Dike (1995–), Nigerian female soccer player; first native Oklahoman to ever play in the Women's World Cup, in 2015 in Canada
- Austin Eckroat (1999–), PGA Tour player
- Daryl Dike (2000–), Nigerian-American soccer player who plays for West Bromwich Albion in the EFL Championship and the U.S. men's national team
