= Liván López =

Cuban freestyle wrestler

Livan Lopez
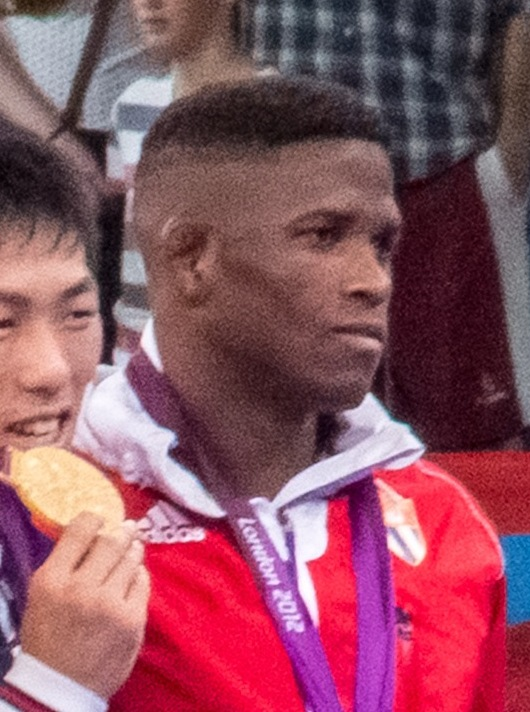
- Liván López in 2012

Personal information
- Nationality: Cuba
- Born: January 24, 1982 (age 44) Pinar del Río, Cuba
- Height: 172 cm (5 ft 8 in)
- Weight: 79 kg (174 lb)

Sport
- Sport: Wrestling
- Event: Freestyle
Medal record
Men's freestyle wrestling
Representing Cuba
Olympic Games
Bronze medal – third place	2012 London	66 kg
World Championships
Silver medal – second place	2013 Budapest	66 kg
Bronze medal – third place	2011 Istanbul	66 kg
Bronze medal – third place	2014 Tashkent	74 kg
Pan American Games
Gold medal – first place	2011 Guadalajara	66 kg
Bronze medal – third place	2015 Toronto	74 kg
Pan American Championships
Gold medal – first place	2011 Rionegro	66 kg
Gold medal – first place	2016 Frisco	86 kg
Gold medal – first place	2018 Lima	74 kg
Silver medal – second place	2014 Mexico	74 kg

Liván López Azcuy (born January 24, 1982) is a male freestyle wrestler from Cuba who competes in the 66 kg category. In 2011, he won a gold medal at the Pan American Games and a bronze medal at the 2011 World Wrestling Championships. The next year he won a bronze medal at the 2012 Summer Olympics. Liván López beat reigning multiple World Champion Mehdi Taghavi (1–0, 0–1, 5–0) in the first match, lost by the narrow margin to eventual Olympic Champion Tatsuhiro Yonemitsu (0–1, 1-1) in the second match of the elimination rounds then won the bronze medal after defeating multiple European Champion and World Championships medalist Jabrayil Hasanov by pinfall in the repechage rounds.
