= Leonid Bazan =

Bulgarian wrestler

Personal information
- Full name: Leonid Anatolievich Bazan
- Nationality: Bulgaria
- Born: 11 June 1985 (age 41) Vynohradivka, Artsyz Raion, Odesa Oblast, Ukrainian SSR
- Height: 1.68 m (5 ft 6 in)
- Weight: 66 kg (146 lb)

Sport
- Sport: Wrestling
- Event: Freestyle
- Club: Chernomorskyj Sokol (BUL)
- Coached by: Simeon Shterev (BUL)
Medal record
Men's freestyle wrestling
Representing Bulgaria
European Championships
Silver medal – second place	2011 Dortmund	66 kg
Silver medal – second place	2012 Belgrade	66 kg
Bronze medal – third place	2013 Tbilisi	74 kg

Leonid Anatolievich Bazan (Bulgarian: Леонид Анатолиевич Базан; born June 11, 1985, in Vynohradivka, Odesa Oblast, Ukrainian SSR, USSR) is an amateur Ukrainian-born Ukrainian, and later, Bulgarian freestyle wrestler.

He competed in the men's wrestling weight classes in the range from 66 to 74 kg.

Bazan competed for Ukraine in the wrestling competition (66 kg) for the World Cup (2007). Having moved to Varna, Bulgaria (2010), he won two silver medals in his division at the 2011 European Wrestling Championships in Dortmund, Germany, and at the 2012 European Wrestling Championships in Belgrade, Serbia. He is also a member of Chernomorskyj Sokol Wrestling Club in Varna, and is coached and trained by Simeon Shterev.

Bazan represented his adopted nation Bulgaria at the 2012 Summer Olympics in London, where he competed in the men's 66 kg class. He received a bye for the preliminary round of sixteen, before losing out to Azerbaijan's Jabrayil Hasanov, who was able to score three points each in two straight periods, leaving Bazan with a single point.
