= Mehdi Taghavi =

Iranian wrestler (born 1987)

Personal information
- Full name: Mehdi Taghavi Kermani
- Nationality: Iran
- Born: February 20, 1987 (age 39) Savadkuh, mazandaran, Iran
- Height: 170 cm (5 ft 7 in)
- Weight: 66 kg (146 lb)

Sport
- Country: Iran
- Sport: Wrestling
- Club: Mooezipour Wrestling Club
- Coached by: Gholamreza Mohammadi
Medal record
Representing Iran
Men's freestyle wrestling
World Championships
Gold medal – first place	2009 Herning	66 kg
Gold medal – first place	2011 Istanbul	66 kg
World Cup
Gold medal – first place	2009 Теhran	66 kg
Asian Games
Silver medal – second place	2010 Guangzhou	66 kg
Asian Championships
Gold medal – first place	2009 Pattaya	66 kg
Gold medal – first place	2012 Gumi	66 kg
Bronze medal – third place	2007 Bishkek	60 kg
Grand Prix
Gold medal – first place	2010 Tbilisi	66 kg
Gold medal – first place	2012 Madrid	66 kg
U20 World Championships
Gold medal – first place	2006 Guatemala-City	60 kg
Gold medal – first place	2007 Beijing	60 kg
U20 Asian Championships
Gold medal – first place	2006 Abu Dhabi	60 kg

Mehdi Taghavi (Persian: مهدى تقوى; born February 20, 1987, in Savadkuh) is an Iranian wrestler. Taghavi was the favorite to win the 2012 London Olympics but was upset in the first round by Cuba's Liván López who ended up winning the bronze. Taghavi had previously beaten Lopez at the 2011 World Wrestling Championships.

At the 2008 Summer Olympics, he beat Haislan Garcia in the first round, before losing to Ramazan Şahin in the quarterfinals. As Şahin went on to the final, Taghavi took part in the bronze medal repechage where he lost to Geandry Garzón.
