= David Safaryan =

Armenian-Russian wrestler

Personal information
- Native name: Դավիթ Սաֆարյան
- Nationality: Armenia
- Born: 1 August 1989 (age 36) Cherkessk, Russia
- Height: 170 cm (5 ft 7 in)

Sport
- Country: Armenia
- Sport: Wrestling
- Weight class: 65 kg
- Event: Freestyle
- Coached by: Ovik Safaryan; Araik Baghdadyan
Medal record
Men's Freestyle Wrestling
Representing Armenia
World Championships
Gold medal – first place	2013 Budapest	66 kg
European Championships
Gold medal – first place	2013 Tbilisi	66 kg
Bronze medal – third place	2012 Belgrade	66 kg
Summer Universiade
Silver medal – second place	2013 Kazan	66 kg

David Safaryan (Armenian: Դավիթ Սաֆարյան; born 1 August 1989) is an Armenian and Russian Freestyle wrestler and World and European Champion.

== Biography ==
Safaryan was born on 1 August 1989 in Cherkessk, Russia. He began wrestling since childhood in his father's initiative, who had the title of Master of Sports in wrestling. Since 2003, he trained in Krasnodar under Abdulla Magomedov. From 2006 to 2009, he was a member of the cadet and junior national team of Russia, becoming a Cadet European Champion in 2006 and 2007 and a Junior World Championships silver medalist in 2009.

Later, Safaryan decided to compete for Armenia, where he began to train under the head coach of the Armenian freestyle wrestling team Araik Baghdadyan. His first success at the senior international level came when he won a bronze medal at the 2012 European Wrestling Championships. Shortly thereafter, he competed at the 2012 Summer Olympics in London, but was unable to win a medal due to controversial refereeing while facing Kazakh Akzhurek Tanatarov in the quarterfinals, amid a number of other controversial Kazakhstan victories.

He won a gold medal at the 2013 European Wrestling Championships in Tbilisi. Safaryan is the first Armenian to become a European Champion in freestyle wrestling in nine years. Prime Minister of Georgia Bidzina Ivanishvili came up and congratulated David afterwards. At the 2013 Summer Universiade in Kazan, he won a silver medal. Later that year Safaryan also won the gold medal at the 2013 World Wrestling Championships in Budapest, taking revenge on Tanatarov in the quarterfinals and defeating Cuban Liván López, another 2012 Olympic medalist, in the finals. Safaryan was named the Armenian Athlete of the Year for 2013 by vote conducted by the Republican Federation of Sports Journalists of Armenia.

He also competed at the 2016 Summer Olympics.
