= Rasul Dzhukaev =

Russian freestyle wrestler

Medal record

Men's freestyle wrestling

Representing Russia

World Championships
Silver medal – second place	2009 Herning	66 kg

European Wrestling Championships
Bronze medal – third place	2008 Tampere	66 kg

Golden Grand Prix Ivan Yarygin
Gold medal – first place	2015 Krasnoyarsk	70 kg

Rasul Magomedovich Dzhukaev (Russian: Расул Магомедович Джукаев, born August 11, 1984, in Grozny) is a Chechen freestyle wrestler from Russia. He won a silver medal in the 66 kg. division at the 2009 FILA World Championships. In Russian National Freestyle Wrestling Championships 2015 he won bronze medal in 2017.
