= Jabrayil Hasanov =

Azerbaijani wrestler (born 1990)

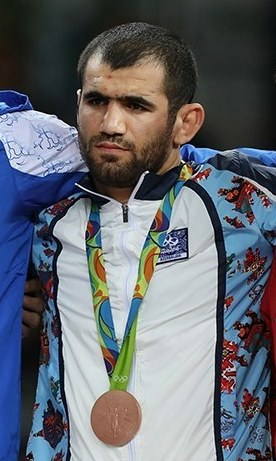

Medal record

Men's Freestyle wrestling

Representing Azerbaijan

Olympic Games
Bronze medal – third place	2016 Rio de Janeiro	74 kg

World Championships
Silver medal – second place	2018 Budapest	79 kg
Silver medal – second place	2019 Nur-Sultan	79 kg
Bronze medal – third place	2010 Moscow	66 kg
Bronze medal – third place	2011 Istanbul	66 kg

European Championships
Gold medal – first place	2010 Baku	66 kg
Gold medal – first place	2011 Dortmund	66 kg
Gold medal – first place	2019 Bucharest	79 kg
Silver medal – second place	2009 Vilnius	66 kg
Silver medal – second place	2014 Vantaa	74 kg
Silver medal – second place	2016 Riga	74 kg
Bronze medal – third place	2018 Kaspiysk	79 kg
Bronze medal – third place	2020 Rome	79 kg

European Games
Bronze medal – third place	2015 Baku	74 kg

World Cup
Silver medal – second place	2012 Baku	66 kg
Gold medal – first place	2009 Tehran	66 kg

Summer Universiade
Silver medal – second place	2013 Kazan	74 kg

Jabrayil Hasanov (Azerbaijani: Cəbrayıl Həsənov, born on 24 February 1990 in Suparibağ, Astara, Azerbaijan, Soviet Union) is a male freestyle wrestler from Azerbaijan who has competed in the 66, 74 and 79 kg categories. He is an Olympic bronze medalist, multiple World Championships medalist, and the winner of Yasar Dogu Grand-Prix.

== Career ==
In 2010 and 2011 he won the European championships and finished third at the world championships. Next year he was fifth at the 2012 Summer Olympics. At the 2012 Summer Olympics, he beat Leonid Bazan and Ali Shabanov before losing to eventual gold medalist Tatsuhiro Yonemitsu in the semifinal. He was entered into the repechage and lost his bronze medal match to Liván López.

He graduated from the Azerbaijan State Sport Academy and is coached by Aslan Agaev since 2000.

In June 2015, he competed in the inaugural European Games, for the host country Azerbaijan in wrestling, in the men's freestyle 74 kg division. He earned a bronze medal.

In the -74 kg freestyle competition at the Rio Olympics, he beat Carlos Izquierdo and Iakob Makarashvili before losing to Aniuar Geduyev in the semifinal. In the repechage, he won his bronze medal match against Bekzod Abdurakhmonov.

Competing in the men's -79 kg freestyle competition, he won the silver medal at the 2018 World Championships. He beat Ethan Ramos, Ali Shabanau and Ezzatollah Akbari before losing to Kyle Dake in the final.

Competing in the men's -79 kg freestyle competition, he won the silver medal at the 2019 World Wrestling Championships. Kyle Dake beat Hasanov 4-2.
