= Ali Shabanau =

Belarusian wrestler

Personal information
- Native name: Али Шабанов
- Nationality: Belarus
- Born: 25 August 1989 (age 36) Kizilyurt, Dagestan, Russia
- Height: 172 cm (5 ft 8 in)

Sport
- Country: Belarus
- Sport: Wrestling
- Weight class: 86 kg
- Event: Freestyle
Medal record
Men's freestyle wrestling
Representing Belarus
World Championships
Bronze medal – third place	2013 Budapest	74 kg
Bronze medal – third place	2014 Tashkent	70 kg
Bronze medal – third place	2017 Paris	74 kg
Bronze medal – third place	2018 Budapest	79 kg
European Games
Silver medal – second place	2019 Minsk	86 kg
European Championships
Bronze medal – third place	2021 Warsaw	86 kg
Bronze medal – third place	2019 Bucharest	86 kg

Ali Shabanau (Belarusian: Алі Шабанаў, born 25 August 1989), also known as Ali Shabanov, is a Russian-born Belarusian freestyle wrestler who represents Belarus that competed at the 2012 Olympics at 66 kg.

== 2012 Olympics ==
Shabanau won his first match (round of 16) against Jared Frayer of the United States. Shabanau lost his next match (quarterfinal) to Jabrayil Hasanov of Azerbaijan. Shabanau's final placement at the 2012 Olympics was 10th place.
