= 2011 World Wrestling Championships =

- Host city: Istanbul, Turkey
- Dates: 12–18 September 2011
- Stadium: Sinan Erdem Dome

Champions
- Freestyle: Russia
- Greco-Roman: Russia
- Women: Japan

The 2011 World Wrestling Championships was held at the Sinan Erdem Dome in Istanbul, Turkey. The event took place between September 12 and September 18, 2011.

== Medal table ==
Rank	Nation	Gold	Silver	Bronze	Total
1	Russia	4	2	4	10
2	Iran	4	1	2	7
3	Japan	3	1	3	7
4	Azerbaijan	2	1	5	8
5	Belarus	2	1	2	5
6	Bulgaria	2	1	1	4
7	Turkey	1	2	2	5
8	Ukraine	1	1	1	3
9	China	1	0	3	4
9	United States	1	0	3	4
11	Mongolia	0	2	1	3
11	Sweden	0	2	1	3
13	Kazakhstan	0	1	4	5
14	Georgia	0	1	3	4
15	Cuba	0	1	2	3
16	Canada	0	1	1	2
17	Hungary	0	1	0	1
17	Poland	0	1	0	1
17	Puerto Rico	0	1	0	1
20	Armenia	0	0	1	1
20	Croatia	0	0	1	1
20	Finland	0	0	1	1
20	South Korea	0	0	1	1
Totals (23 entries)		21	21	42	84

== Team ranking ==
Rank	Men's freestyle		Men's Greco-Roman		Women's freestyle	
Rank	Team	Points	Team	Points	Team	Points
1	Russia	43	Russia	41	Japan	52
2	Iran	41	Turkey	35	Canada	33
3	United States	38	Iran	30	Mongolia	32
4	Azerbaijan	37	Belarus	25	United States	32
5	Georgia	34	Kazakhstan	23	Russia	31
6	Kazakhstan	29	Bulgaria	21	Azerbaijan	31
7	Japan	23	Azerbaijan	21	China	29
8	Belarus	22	South Korea	20	Ukraine	28
9	Bulgaria	15	Armenia	19	Sweden	17
10	Turkey	13	Hungary	19	Belarus	16

== Medal summary ==
=== Men's freestyle ===
Event	Gold	Silver	Bronze
55 kg	Viktor Lebedev; Russia	Radoslav Velikov; Bulgaria	Daulet Niyazbekov; Kazakhstan
55 kg	Viktor Lebedev; Russia	Radoslav Velikov; Bulgaria	Hassan Rahimi; Iran
60 kg	Besik Kudukhov; Russia	Franklin Gómez; Puerto Rico	Kenichi Yumoto; Japan
60 kg	Besik Kudukhov; Russia	Franklin Gómez; Puerto Rico	Dauren Zhumagaziyev; Kazakhstan
66 kg	Mehdi Taghavi; Iran	Tatsuhiro Yonemitsu; Japan	Jabrayil Hasanov; Azerbaijan
66 kg	Mehdi Taghavi; Iran	Tatsuhiro Yonemitsu; Japan	Liván López; Cuba
74 kg	Jordan Burroughs; United States	Sadegh Goudarzi; Iran	Ashraf Aliyev; Azerbaijan
74 kg	Jordan Burroughs; United States	Sadegh Goudarzi; Iran	Davit Khutsishvili; Georgia
84 kg	Sharif Sharifov; Azerbaijan	Ibragim Aldatov; Ukraine	Dato Marsagishvili; Georgia
84 kg	Sharif Sharifov; Azerbaijan	Ibragim Aldatov; Ukraine	Albert Saritov; Russia
96 kg	Reza Yazdani; Iran	Serhat Balcı; Turkey	Ruslan Sheikhau; Belarus
96 kg	Reza Yazdani; Iran	Serhat Balcı; Turkey	Jake Varner; United States
120 kg	Aleksey Shemarov; Belarus	Bilyal Makhov; Russia	Jamaladdin Magomedov; Azerbaijan
120 kg	Aleksey Shemarov; Belarus	Bilyal Makhov; Russia	Davit Modzmanashvili; Georgia

=== Men's Greco-Roman ===
Event	Gold	Silver	Bronze
55 kg	Rovshan Bayramov; Azerbaijan	Elbek Tazhyieu; Belarus	Li Shujin; China
55 kg	Rovshan Bayramov; Azerbaijan	Elbek Tazhyieu; Belarus	Bekkhan Mankiev; Russia
60 kg	Omid Norouzi; Iran	Almat Kebispayev; Kazakhstan	Zaur Kuramagomedov; Russia
60 kg	Omid Norouzi; Iran	Almat Kebispayev; Kazakhstan	Ivo Angelov; Bulgaria
66 kg	Saeid Abdevali; Iran	Manuchar Tskhadaia; Georgia	Kim Hyeon-woo; South Korea
66 kg	Saeid Abdevali; Iran	Manuchar Tskhadaia; Georgia	Pedro Mulens; Cuba
74 kg	Roman Vlasov; Russia	Selçuk Çebi; Turkey	Neven Žugaj; Croatia
74 kg	Roman Vlasov; Russia	Selçuk Çebi; Turkey	Arsen Julfalakyan; Armenia
84 kg	Alim Selimau; Belarus	Damian Janikowski; Poland	Nazmi Avluca; Turkey
84 kg	Alim Selimau; Belarus	Damian Janikowski; Poland	Rami Hietaniemi; Finland
96 kg	Elis Guri; Bulgaria	Jimmy Lidberg; Sweden	Rustam Totrov; Russia
96 kg	Elis Guri; Bulgaria	Jimmy Lidberg; Sweden	Cenk İldem; Turkey
120 kg	Rıza Kayaalp; Turkey	Mijaín López; Cuba	Nurmakhan Tinaliyev; Kazakhstan
120 kg	Rıza Kayaalp; Turkey	Mijaín López; Cuba	Bashir Babajanzadeh; Iran

=== Women's freestyle ===
Event	Gold	Silver	Bronze
48 kg	Hitomi Obara; Japan	Mariya Stadnik; Azerbaijan	Zhao Shasha; China
48 kg	Hitomi Obara; Japan	Mariya Stadnik; Azerbaijan	Zhuldyz Eshimova; Kazakhstan
51 kg	Zamira Rakhmanova; Russia	Davaasükhiin Otgontsetseg; Mongolia	Patimat Bagomedova; Azerbaijan
51 kg	Zamira Rakhmanova; Russia	Davaasükhiin Otgontsetseg; Mongolia	Jessica MacDonald; Canada
55 kg	Saori Yoshida; Japan	Tonya Verbeek; Canada	Tetyana Lazareva; Ukraine
55 kg	Saori Yoshida; Japan	Tonya Verbeek; Canada	Ida-Theres Nerell; Sweden
59 kg	Hanna Vasylenko; Ukraine	Sofia Mattsson; Sweden	Takako Saito; Japan
59 kg	Hanna Vasylenko; Ukraine	Sofia Mattsson; Sweden	Sona Ahmadli; Azerbaijan
63 kg	Kaori Icho; Japan	Marianna Sastin; Hungary	Ochirbatyn Nasanburmaa; Mongolia
63 kg	Kaori Icho; Japan	Marianna Sastin; Hungary	Jing Ruixue; China
67 kg	Xiluo Zhuoma; China	Banzragchiin Oyuunsüren; Mongolia	Yoshiko Inoue; Japan
67 kg	Xiluo Zhuoma; China	Banzragchiin Oyuunsüren; Mongolia	Adeline Gray; United States
72 kg	Stanka Zlateva; Bulgaria	Ekaterina Bukina; Russia	Ali Bernard; United States
72 kg	Stanka Zlateva; Bulgaria	Ekaterina Bukina; Russia	Vasilisa Marzaliuk; Belarus

== Participating nations ==
825 competitors from 102 nations participated.

- Albania (6)
- Algeria (2)
- American Samoa (2)
- Argentina (3)
- Armenia (14)
- Australia (1)
- Austria (6)
- Azerbaijan (21)
- Belarus (21)
- Brazil (10)
- Bulgaria (19)
- Cameroon (3)
- Canada (14)
- Central African Republic (2)
- Chad (4)
- Chile (1)
- China (21)
- Chinese Taipei (3)
- Colombia (12)
- Congo (2)
- Congo DR (1)
- Croatia (7)
- Cuba (10)
- Cyprus (2)
- Czech Republic (7)
- Denmark (3)
- Dominican Republic (6)
- Ecuador (5)
- Egypt (2)
- El Salvador (2)
- Estonia (5)
- Federated States of Micronesia (1)
- Finland (7)
- France (14)
- Georgia (14)
- Germany (19)
- Great Britain (7)
- Greece (17)
- Guam (3)
- Guatemala (2)
- Guinea-Bissau (3)
- Honduras (2)
- Hungary (16)
- India (18)
- Iran (14)
- Iraq (2)
- Ireland (1)
- Israel (6)
- Italy (15)
- Ivory Coast (1)
- Japan (21)
- Jordan (3)
- Kazakhstan (21)
- Kyrgyzstan (17)
- Latvia (8)
- Lithuania (9)
- Macedonia (3)
- Madagascar (3)
- Marshall Islands (1)
- Mauritius (1)
- Mexico (14)
- Moldova (16)
- Mongolia (14)
- Montenegro (2)
- Morocco (1)
- Namibia (2)
- Netherlands (1)
- Nicaragua (1)
- Nigeria (5)
- North Korea (9)
- Norway (8)
- Palau (2)
- Panama (1)
- Peru (4)
- Philippines (2)
- Poland (18)
- Portugal (4)
- Puerto Rico (2)
- Qatar (1)
- Romania (18)
- Russia (21)
- Senegal (2)
- Serbia (6)
- Sierra Leone (3)
- Slovakia (10)
- Slovenia (2)
- South Africa (4)
- South Korea (17)
- Spain (15)
- Sweden (10)
- Switzerland (8)
- Syria (7)
- Tajikistan (10)
- Tunisia (10)
- Turkey (21)
- Turkmenistan (3)
- Ukraine (21)
- United Arab Emirates (1)
- United States (21)
- Uzbekistan (17)
- Venezuela (17)
- Vietnam (8)
