= Yang Chun-song =

North Korean sport wrestler

Personal information
- National team: North Korea
- Born: March 18, 1984 (age 42)

Sport
- Sport: Wrestling
- Weight class: 66 kg
Medal record
Men's freestyle wrestling
Representing North Korea
Asian Championships
Gold medal – first place	2008 Jeju City	66 kg freestyle

Yang Chun-Song (Korean: 양춘성, born March 18, 1984) is a male freestyle wrestler from North Korea. He participated in Men's freestyle 66 kg at 2008 Summer Olympics. He was eliminated in the 1/8 of final losing with Albert Batyrov.
