= Gergõ Wöller =

Hungarian freestyle wrestler

Personal information
- Full name: Gergõ Wöller
- Nationality: Hungary
- Born: 18 March 1983 (age 43) Szombathely, Hungary
- Height: 1.68 m (5 ft 6 in)
- Weight: 68 kg (150 lb)

Sport
- Style: Freestyle
- Club: Vasi Volán Sportegyesület
- Coach: István Gulyás (2002–2007); Levente Kovács (2007–)
Medal record
Men's freestyle wrestling
Representing Hungary
European Championships
Bronze medal – third place	2007 Sofia	60 kg
Bronze medal – third place	2008 Tampere	60 kg
Bronze medal – third place	2012 Belgrade	66 kg

Gergõ Wöller (born March 18, 1983, in Szombathely) is an amateur Hungarian freestyle wrestler, who competed in the men's lightweight category. He represented his nation Hungary at the 2004 Summer Olympics, and later picked up three bronze medals at the European Wrestling Championships. During his sporting career, Woller has been training under his personal coach and mentor Levente Kovács for Vasas SC in Budapest and Vasi Volán Sportegyesület in his hometown Szombathely.

Woller qualified for Hungary in the men's 60 kg class at the 2004 Summer Olympics in Athens by placing third and receiving a berth from the Olympic Qualification Tournament in Sofia, Bulgaria. He lost two straight matches each to Kyrgyzstan's Ulan Nadyrbek Uulu (0–3) and Ukraine's Vasyl Fedoryshyn (0–3) in a three-man preliminary pool, finishing only in third place and nineteenth overall in the final standings without receiving a single technical point.

Shortly after the Games, Woller continued to deliver mediocre results at the peak of his sporting career, until he radically emerged into the international scene by picking up two bronze medals in the 60-kg division at the 2007 and 2008 European Wrestling Championships. He also sought to compete for his second Olympic bid in Beijing, but finished farther enough from the rankings.

At the 2012 European Wrestling Championships in Belgrade, Serbia, Woller ended his four-year medal drought by defeating Georgia's Otar Tushishvili to score his third career bronze in the men's featherweight category (66 kg). He was also determined to return again to the Olympic scene from his eight-year absence, but struggled to fill a spot on the Hungarian team in three Olympic Qualification Tournaments for the upcoming Olympics in London.
