= Haislan Garcia =

Canadian freestyle wrestler

Haislan Veranes
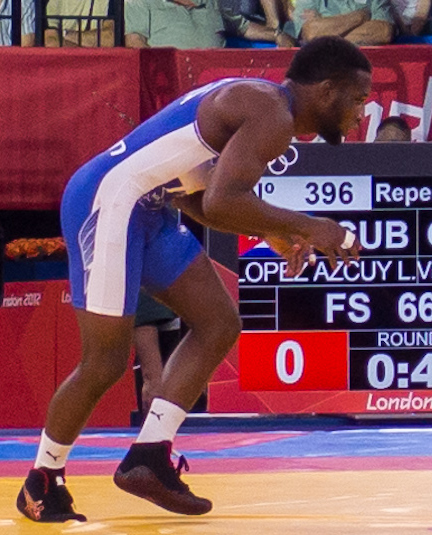
- Garcia at the 2012 Olympics

Personal information
- Nationality: Canada
- Born: March 4, 1983 (age 43) Guanabacoa, Cuba
- Height: 1.75 m (5 ft 9 in)
- Weight: 73 kg (161 lb)

Sport
- Country: Canada
- Sport: Freestyle wrestling
- Weight class: 65 kg
- Club: Burnaby Mountain, Vancouver
- Coached by: Dave McKay
Medal record
Representing Canada
Pan American Games
Bronze medal – third place	2015 Toronto	65 kg
Pan American Championships
Bronze medal – third place	2011 Rionegro	66 kg
Bronze medal – third place	2010 Monterrey	66 kg
Silver medal – second place	2009 Maracaibo	66 kg
Silver medal – second place	2008 Colorado Springs	66 kg
Olympic Qualification Tournament
Silver medal – second place	2016 Istanbul	65 kg
Bronze medal – third place	2016 Frisco	65 kg
Gold medal – first place	2012 Kissimmee Orlando	66 kg

Haislan Veranes Garcia (born March 4, 1983) is a Canadian freestyle wrestler. Competing in the 65–66 kg division, he participated in the 2008, 2012 and 2016 Olympics; he reached quarter-finals in 2012, losing to the eventual champion Tatsuhiro Yonemitsu. Garcia competed at six world championships, beginning in 2009, and placed fifth in 2010. In 2015 he won a bronze medal at the 2015 Pan American Games in Toronto. At the Pan American Championships he won silver medals in 2008 and 2009 and bronze medals in 2010 and 2011.

Garcia was born in Cuba and immigrated to Canada in 2004, following his father, mother and younger sister. He graduated from a military school in Cuba and has a son Harrison, who also competes in wrestling.
