= Tatsuhiro Yonemitsu =

Japanese wrestler (born 1986)

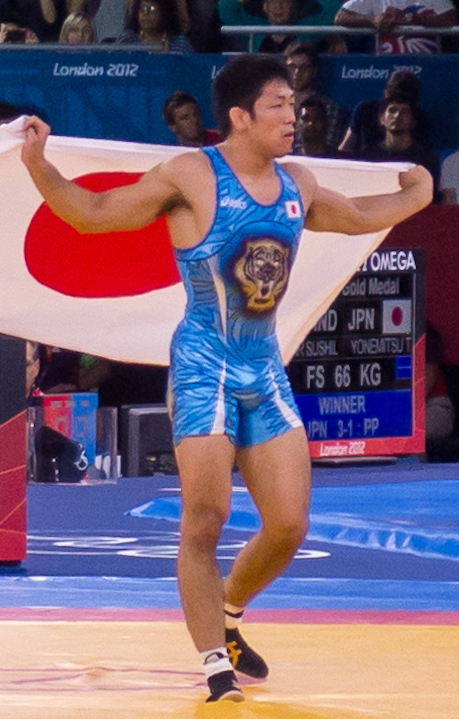
- Yonemitsu at the 2012 Summer Olympics

Medal record

Men's freestyle wrestling

Representing Japan

Olympic Games
Gold medal – first place	2012 London	66 kg

World Championships
Silver medal – second place	2011 Istanbul	66 kg
Bronze medal – third place	2009 Herning	66 kg

Asian Games
Gold medal – first place	2010 Guangzhou	66 kg

Asian Championships
Silver medal – second place	2009 Pattaya	66 kg

Tatsuhiro Yonemitsu (米満 達弘, Yonemitsu Tatsuhiro; born August 5, 1986 in Yamanashi Prefecture) is a Japanese wrestler. He won a gold medal at the 2012 Summer Olympics in London, beating Sushil Kumar of India in the first two rounds of the three-round finals of the 66 kg Men's Freestyle Wrestling.

Yonemitsu is a second lieutenant in the Japan Ground Self-Defense Force.

== Awards ==
- Tokyo Sports
  - Wrestling Special Award (2009)
