= 2010 World Wrestling Championships – Men's freestyle 96 kg =

Men's freestyle 96 kg at the 2010 World Championships
- Venue: Olympic Stadium
- Dates: 11 September 2010
- Competitors: 33 from 33 nations

Medalists
gold medal	Khetag Gazyumov	Azerbaijan
silver medal	Khadzhimurat Gatsalov	Russia
bronze medal	Ruslan Sheikhau	Belarus
bronze medal	Giorgi Gogshelidze	Georgia

The men's freestyle 96 kilograms is a competition featured at the 2010 World Wrestling Championships, and was held at the Olympic Stadium in Moscow, Russia on 11 September.

== Results ==
Legend

- F — Won by fall

=== Finals ===
Semifinals			Final
Aleksey Krupnyakov (KGZ)	0	0
Khetag Gazyumov (AZE)	3	3	Khetag Gazyumov (AZE)	0	1	1
Khadzhimurat Gatsalov (RUS)	3	1	Khadzhimurat Gatsalov (RUS)	1	0	0
Erfan Amiri (IRI)	0	0

=== Top half ===
==== Section 1 ====
Round of 64

Round of 32
Leon Rattigan (GBR)	0	0
Serhat Balcı (TUR)	1	1
Takao Isokawa (JPN)	3	1
Lyuben Iliev (BUL)	0	0
Andreas Pieri (CYP)	0	0
Kim Jae-gang (KOR)	3	6
Kurban Kurbanov (UZB)	3	0	1
Aleksey Krupnyakov (KGZ)	2	2	1

Round of 16
Serhat Balcı (TUR)	1	4
Takao Isokawa (JPN)	0	0
Kim Jae-gang (KOR)	0	0
Aleksey Krupnyakov (KGZ)	4	6

Quarterfinals
Serhat Balcı (TUR)	2	0	0
Aleksey Krupnyakov (KGZ)	1	1	2

==== Section 2 ====
Round of 64

Round of 32
Wu Yunbilige (CHN)	0	0
Sinivie Boltic (NGR)	4	1
Aleksandar Georgiev (MKD)	0	0
Ruslan Sheikhau (BLR)	2	4
Khetag Pliev (CAN)	4	2
Antans Azarevičs (LAT)	1	0
Khetag Gazyumov (AZE)	7	5
Aristide Diatta (SEN)	0	0

Round of 16
Sinivie Boltic (NGR)	0	0
Ruslan Sheikhau (BLR)	2	1
Khetag Pliev (CAN)	0	1
Khetag Gazyumov (AZE)	3	6

Quarterfinals
Ruslan Sheikhau (BLR)	0	0
Khetag Gazyumov (AZE)	1	1

=== Bottom half ===
==== Section 3 ====
Round of 64

Round of 32
Etienne van Huyssteen (RSA)	1	4	1
Jozef Jaloviar (SVK)	1	1	2
Edgar Yenokyan (ARM)	1	0
Khadzhimurat Gatsalov (RUS)	1	6
Ioannis Papadopoulos (GRE)	0	0
Giorgi Gogshelidze (GEO)	2	5
Maurice Abatam (CHA)	0	0
Radosław Baran (POL)	2	6

Round of 16
Jozef Jaloviar (SVK)	0	2
Khadzhimurat Gatsalov (RUS)	1	4
Giorgi Gogshelidze (GEO)	1	3
Radosław Baran (POL)	0	1

Quarterfinals
Khadzhimurat Gatsalov (RUS)	0	1	2
Giorgi Gogshelidze (GEO)	1	0	0

==== Section 4 ====
Round of 64
Valeriy Andriytsev (UKR)	0	3	5
Johannes Kessel (GER)	1	2	0

Round of 32
Farkhod Anakulov (TJK)	0	0
J. D. Bergman (USA)	4	3^{F}
Daulet Shabanbay (KAZ)	0	1
Erfan Amiri (IRI)	1	2
Michel Batista (CUB)	2	2
Yadamsürengiin Altantulga (MGL)	0	0
Nicolae Ceban (MDA)	1	1
Valeriy Andriytsev (UKR)	0	1

Round of 16
J. D. Bergman (USA)	1	2
Erfan Amiri (IRI)	2	4
Michel Batista (CUB)	3	2
Nicolae Ceban (MDA)	0	0

Quarterfinals
Erfan Amiri (IRI)	1	1
Michel Batista (CUB)	0	1

=== Repechage ===
Repechage round 2
Aristide Diatta (SEN)	0
Khetag Pliev (CAN)	5^{F}
Edgar Yenokyan (ARM)	3	2
Jozef Jaloviar (SVK)	0	1

Repechage round 3
Khetag Pliev (CAN)	0	0
Ruslan Sheikhau (BLR)	1	1
Edgar Yenokyan (ARM)	1	0	0
Giorgi Gogshelidze (GEO)	0	3	5

Bronze medals
Ruslan Sheikhau (BLR)	0	1	0
Aleksey Krupnyakov (KGZ)	3	0	1
Giorgi Gogshelidze (GEO)	3	3
Erfan Amiri (IRI)	1	1

- Aleksey Krupnyakov of Kyrgyzstan originally won the bronze medal, but was disqualified after he tested positive for Nandrolone. Ruslan Sheikhau was raised to third and took the bronze medal.
