= 2011 World Wrestling Championships – Men's freestyle 96 kg =

Wrestling Event

Men's freestyle 96 kg at the 2011 World Championships
- Venue: Sinan Erdem Dome
- Dates: 17 September 2011
- Competitors: 41 from 41 nations

Medalists
gold medal	Reza Yazdani	Iran
silver medal	Serhat Balcı	Turkey
bronze medal	Ruslan Sheikhau	Belarus
bronze medal	Jake Varner	United States

The men's freestyle 96 kilograms was a competition featured at the 2011 World Wrestling Championships, and was held at the Sinan Erdem Dome in Istanbul, Turkey on 17 September 2011.

== Results ==
Legend

- F — Won by fall

=== Finals ===
Semifinals				Final
Sinivie Boltic (NGR)	0	1
Reza Yazdani (IRI)	1	8		Reza Yazdani (IRI)	4	0	1
Serhat Balcı (TUR)	0	2	2	Serhat Balcı (TUR)	0	1	0
Taimuraz Tigiyev (KAZ)	2	1	1

=== Top half ===
==== Section 1 ====
Round of 64

Round of 32
Etienne van Huyssteen (RSA)	0	1	4
Takao Isokawa (JPN)	1	0	1
Juan Esteban Martínez (COL)	0	0
Sinivie Boltic (NGR)	2	2
Kurban Kurbanov (UZB)	4^{F}
Mohamed Barrie (SLE)	0
Maurice Abatam (CHA)	0
Radosław Baran (POL)	4^{F}

Round of 16
Etienne van Huyssteen (RSA)	0	0
Sinivie Boltic (NGR)	1	3
Kurban Kurbanov (UZB)	0	1	1
Radosław Baran (POL)	1	0	0

Quarterfinals
Sinivie Boltic (NGR)	3	6^{F}
Kurban Kurbanov (UZB)	0	0

==== Section 2 ====
Round of 64

Round of 32
Gergely Kiss (HUN)	0	3	8
Kim Jae-gang (KOR)	1	0	1
Eder Villanueva (ESP)	3
Reza Yazdani (IRI)	5^{F}
Ruslan Sheikhau (BLR)	5	4
Raja Al-Karrad (SYR)	0	0
Alen Zaseyev (UKR)	0	0
Khetag Gazyumov (AZE)	1	3

Round of 16
Gergely Kiss (HUN)	0	1
Reza Yazdani (IRI)	4	3
Ruslan Sheikhau (BLR)	1	2
Khetag Gazyumov (AZE)	0	0

Quarterfinals
Reza Yazdani (IRI)	0	3	4
Ruslan Sheikhau (BLR)	1	0	0

=== Bottom half ===
==== Section 3 ====
Round of 64
Rustam Iskandari (TJK)	2	2
Imants Lagodskis (LAT)	1	1

Round of 32
Jake Varner (USA)	3	5
Krasimir Kochev (BUL)	0	0
Simas Asačiovas (LTU)	4	0	0
Wu Yunbilige (CHN)	0	4	2
Serhat Balcı (TUR)	2	4
Luis Vivenes (VEN)	0	0
Diego Rodrigues (BRA)	1	0	3
Rustam Iskandari (TJK)	0	2	4^{F}

Round of 16
Jake Varner (USA)	7	6
Wu Yunbilige (CHN)	1	0
Serhat Balcı (TUR)	3	6
Rustam Iskandari (TJK)	0	0

Quarterfinals
Jake Varner (USA)	0	0
Serhat Balcı (TUR)	1	1

==== Section 4 ====
Round of 64
Andreas Tserahidis (GRE)	1	0	0
Nicolae Ceban (MDA)	0	4	4
Khadzhimurat Gatsalov (RUS)	1	4
William Harth (GER)	0	0
C. J. Floor (ASA)	0	0
Khetag Pliev (CAN)	7	5
Giorgi Gogshelidze (GEO)	0	1	0
Taimuraz Tigiyev (KAZ)	1	0	1
Harutyun Yenokyan (ARM)	4	3
Angula Shikongo (NAM)	1	0
Leon Rattigan (GBR)	0	1	0
Mausam Khatri (IND)	1	0	1
Adrian Recorean (ROU)	0	0
Jozef Jaloviar (SVK)	1	3
Israel Silva (MEX)	0	1	0
Natsagsürengiin Zolboo (MGL)	3	0	1

Round of 32
Nicolae Ceban (MDA)	0	1
Khadzhimurat Gatsalov (RUS)	1	2
Khetag Pliev (CAN)	0	0
Taimuraz Tigiyev (KAZ)	1	2
Harutyun Yenokyan (ARM)	1	0	1
Mausam Khatri (IND)	1	1	2
Jozef Jaloviar (SVK)	6	0	1
Natsagsürengiin Zolboo (MGL)	0	3	0

Round of 16
Khadzhimurat Gatsalov (RUS)	0	2
Taimuraz Tigiyev (KAZ)	1	5
Mausam Khatri (IND)	0	2	0
Jozef Jaloviar (SVK)	1	0	2

Quarterfinals
Taimuraz Tigiyev (KAZ)	1	1
Jozef Jaloviar (SVK)	0	0

=== Repechage ===
Repechage round 2
Eder Villanueva (ESP)	0	0
Gergely Kiss (HUN)	5	5^{F}
Luis Vivenes (VEN)	0
Rustam Iskandari (TJK)	4^{F}

Repechage round 3
Gergely Kiss (HUN)	0	0
Ruslan Sheikhau (BLR)	3	3
Rustam Iskandari (TJK)	0
Jake Varner (USA)	5^{F}

Bronze medals
Ruslan Sheikhau (BLR)	1	1
Sinivie Boltic (NGR)	0	0
Jake Varner (USA)	0	3	2
Taimuraz Tigiyev (KAZ)	3	2	1
