= 2009 World Wrestling Championships – Men's freestyle 96 kg =

Men's freestyle 96 kg at the 2009 World Championships
- Venue: Messecenter Herning
- Dates: 21 September 2009
- Competitors: 29 from 29 nations

Medalists
gold medal	Khadzhimurat Gatsalov	Russia
silver medal	Khetag Gazyumov	Azerbaijan
bronze medal	Serhat Balcı	Turkey
bronze medal	Giorgi Gogshelidze	Georgia

The men's freestyle 96 kilograms is a competition featured at the 2009 World Wrestling Championships, and was held at the Messecenter Herning exhibition center in Herning, Denmark on September 21.

This freestyle wrestling competition consists of a single-elimination tournament, with a repechage used to determine the winner of two bronze medals.

== Results ==
Legend

- F — Won by fall
- WO — Won by walkover

=== Final ===
Final
Khetag Gazyumov (AZE)	2	1	0
Khadzhimurat Gatsalov (RUS)	0	1	1

=== Top half ===
Round of 32
Radosław Baran (POL)	0	0
Serhat Balcı (TUR)	3	4
~~Daulet Shabanbay (KAZ)~~
Edgar Yenokyan (ARM)	W	O
Valeriy Andriytsev (UKR)	0	1
Ruslan Sheikhau (BLR)	1	4
Anil Kumar Mann (IND)	2	1
Gao Jiayu (CHN)	0	0
Saleh Emara (EGY)	2	0	2
Khetag Pliev (CAN)	1	8	0

Round of 16
Khetag Gazyumov (AZE)	1	4
Nicolae Ceban (MDA)	0	1
Mohammed Suhail (IRQ)	0	0
Serhat Balcı (TUR)	7	6
Edgar Yenokyan (ARM)	0	0
Ruslan Sheikhau (BLR)	3	2
Anil Kumar Mann (IND)	0	1	1
Saleh Emara (EGY)	2	0	1

Quarterfinals
Khetag Gazyumov (AZE)	3	1
Serhat Balcı (TUR)	2	0
Ruslan Sheikhau (BLR)	1	2
Saleh Emara (EGY)	0	0

Semifinals
Khetag Gazyumov (AZE)	1	1
Ruslan Sheikhau (BLR)	0	1

=== Bottom half ===
Round of 32
Dániel Ligeti (HUN)	2	0	0
Jake Varner (USA)	1	2	1
Takao Isokawa (JPN)	2	1
Diego Rodrigues (BRA)	0	0
Israel Silva (MEX)	2	0	0
Rémi Delcampe (FRA)	0	1	2
Saeid Ebrahimi (IRI)	4	1	1
Kurban Kurbanov (UZB)	0	3	0
Etienne van Huyssteen (RSA)	0	0
Khadzhimurat Gatsalov (RUS)	3	1
Nikolay Chterev (BUL)	0	0
Giorgi Gogshelidze (GEO)	1	6
Vasili Kalashnikov (ISR)	1	1
Leon Rattigan (GBR)	2	3
Oldrik Wagner (GER)	5^{F}
Luis Vivenes (VEN)	2

Round of 16
Jake Varner (USA)	1	1
Takao Isokawa (JPN)	0	0
Rémi Delcampe (FRA)	0	1
Saeid Ebrahimi (IRI)	6	2
Khadzhimurat Gatsalov (RUS)	1	1
Giorgi Gogshelidze (GEO)	0	0
Leon Rattigan (GBR)	1	1	2
Oldrik Wagner (GER)	0	3	4

Quarterfinals
Jake Varner (USA)	0	0
Saeid Ebrahimi (IRI)	1	1
Khadzhimurat Gatsalov (RUS)	3	3
Oldrik Wagner (GER)	0	0

Semifinals
Saeid Ebrahimi (IRI)	0	1	0
Khadzhimurat Gatsalov (RUS)	1	0	4

=== Repechage ===
Repechage round 1
Etienne van Huyssteen (RSA)	0
Giorgi Gogshelidze (GEO)	6^{F}

Repechage round 2
Nicolae Ceban (MDA)	0	0
Serhat Balcı (TUR)	1	1
Giorgi Gogshelidze (GEO)	3	3
Oldrik Wagner (GER)	1	1

Bronze medals
Serhat Balcı (TUR)	1	1
Ruslan Sheikhau (BLR)	0	0
Giorgi Gogshelidze (GEO)	1	1
Saeid Ebrahimi (IRI)	0	0
