= Wrestling at the 2012 Summer Olympics – Men's freestyle 96 kg =

Men's freestyle 96 kg at the Games of the XXX Olympiad
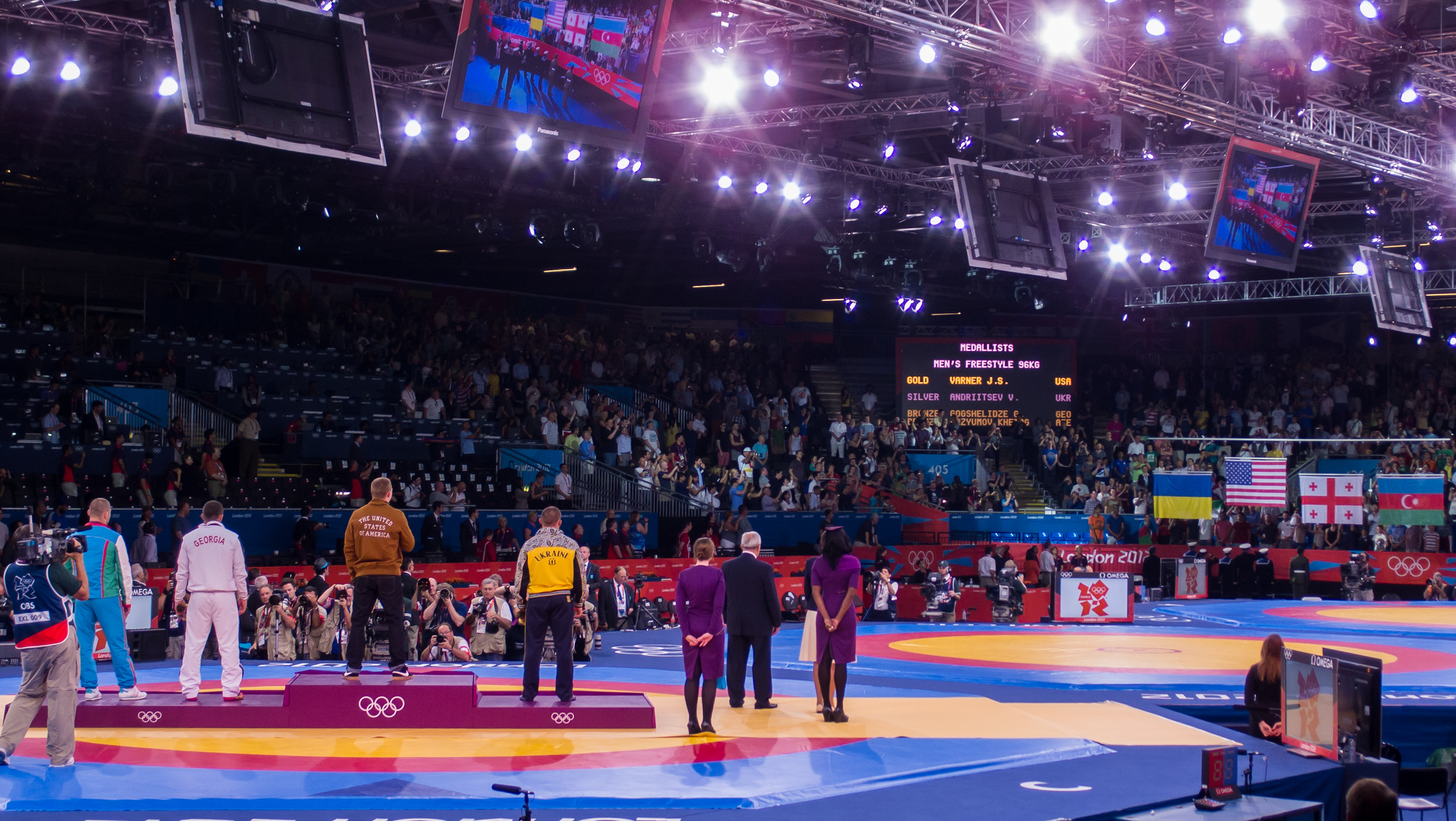
- Men's freestyle 96 kg victory ceremony
- Venue: ExCeL London
- Date: 12 August 2012
- Competitors: 19 from 19 nations

Medalists
1st place, gold medalist(s)		Jake Varner	United States
2nd place, silver medalist(s)		Valeriy Andriytsev	Ukraine
3rd place, bronze medalist(s)		Giorgi Gogshelidze	Georgia
3rd place, bronze medalist(s)		Khetag Gazyumov	Azerbaijan

Men's freestyle 96 kilograms competition at the 2012 Summer Olympics in London, United Kingdom, took place on 12 August at ExCeL London. This freestyle wrestling competition consisted of a single-elimination tournament, with a repechage used to determine the winners of two bronze medals. The two finalists faced off for gold and silver medals. Each wrestler who lost to one of the two finalists moved into the repechage, culminating in a pair of bronze medal matches featuring the semifinal losers each facing the remaining repechage opponent from their half of the bracket.

Each bout consisted of up to three rounds, lasting two minutes apiece. The wrestler who scored more points in each round was the winner of that rounds; the bout finished when one wrestler had won two rounds (and thus the match).

== Schedule ==
All times are British Summer Time (UTC+01:00)

Date	Time	Event
12 August 2012	08:30	Qualification rounds
12 August 2012	12:45	Repechage
12 August 2012	13:45	Finals

== Results ==
Legend

- R — Retired
- WO — Won by walkover

=== Final ===
Final
Jake Varner (USA)	1	1
Valeriy Andriytsev (UKR)	0	0

=== Top half ===
Qualifications

1/8 finals
Saleh Emara (EGY)
Giorgi Gogshelidze (GEO)	W	O
Nicolae Ceban (MDA)	1	0	1
Sinivie Boltic (NGR)	0	1	0
Khetag Pliev (CAN)	0	2	1
Javier Cortina (CUB)	2	2	0
Jake Varner (USA)	1	0	1
Kurban Kurbanov (UZB)	0	1	0

1/4 finals
Giorgi Gogshelidze (GEO)	1	1
Nicolae Ceban (MDA)	0	0
Khetag Pliev (CAN)	0	0
Jake Varner (USA)	1	1

Semifinals
Giorgi Gogshelidze (GEO)	2	0	0
Jake Varner (USA)	0	1	1

=== Bottom half ===
Qualifications
Abdusalam Gadisov (RUS)	1	1
Taimuraz Tigiyev (KAZ)	1	0
Serhat Balcı (TUR)	1	0	0
Magomed Musaev (KGZ)	0	1	2
Nathaniel Tuamoheloa (ASA)
Takao Isokawa (JPN)	W	O

1/8 finals
Valeriy Andriytsev (UKR)	2	4
Rustam Iskandari (TJK)	1	0
Ruslan Sheikhau (BLR)	0	0
Khetag Gazyumov (AZE)	1	1
Reza Yazdani (IRI)	0	3	3
Abdusalam Gadisov (RUS)	3	0	1
Magomed Musaev (KGZ)	1	2
Takao Isokawa (JPN)	0	1

1/4 finals
Valeriy Andriytsev (UKR)	0	1	4
Khetag Gazyumov (AZE)	1	0	1
Reza Yazdani (IRI)	2	4
Magomed Musaev (KGZ)	0	2

Semifinals
Valeriy Andriytsev (UKR)	5
Reza Yazdani (IRI)	0^{R}

=== Repechage ===
Repechage round 2
Kurban Kurbanov (UZB)	1	4
Khetag Pliev (CAN)	0	1
Rustam Iskandari (TJK)	1	0
Khetag Gazyumov (AZE)	3	3

Bronze medals
Kurban Kurbanov (UZB)	1	0	0
Giorgi Gogshelidze (GEO)	0	4	2
Khetag Gazyumov (AZE)	W	O
Reza Yazdani (IRI)

== Final standing ==
Rank	Athlete
1st place, gold medalist(s)	Jake Varner (USA)
2nd place, silver medalist(s)	Valeriy Andriytsev (UKR)
3rd place, bronze medalist(s)	Giorgi Gogshelidze (GEO)
3rd place, bronze medalist(s)	Khetag Gazyumov (AZE)
5	Kurban Kurbanov (UZB)
5	Reza Yazdani (IRI)
7	Magomed Musaev (KGZ)
8	Takao Isokawa (JPN)
9	Abdusalam Gadisov (RUS)
10	Khetag Pliev (CAN)
11	Nicolae Ceban (MDA)
12	Rustam Iskandari (TJK)
13	Javier Cortina (CUB)
14	Sinivie Boltic (NGR)
14	Taimuraz Tigiyev (KAZ)
16	Serhat Balcı (TUR)
17	Ruslan Sheikhau (BLR)
18	Nathaniel Tuamoheloa (ASA)
19	Saleh Emara (EGY)
