= Wrestling at the 2010 Asian Games – Men's freestyle 96 kg =

Men's freestyle 96 kg at the 2010 Asian Games
- Venue: Huagong Gymnasium
- Date: 25 November 2010
- Competitors: 12 from 12 nations

Medalists
gold medal	Reza Yazdani	Iran
silver medal	Kurban Kurbanov	Uzbekistan
bronze medal	Takao Isokawa	Japan
bronze medal	Mausam Khatri	India

The men's freestyle 96 kilograms wrestling competition at the 2010 Asian Games in Guangzhou was held on 25 November 2010 at the Huagong Gymnasium.

This freestyle wrestling competition consisted of a single-elimination tournament, with a repechage used to determine the winner of two bronze medals. The two finalists faced off for gold and silver medals. Each wrestler who lost to one of the two finalists moved into the repechage, culminating in a pair of bronze medal matches featuring the semifinal losers each facing the remaining repechage opponent from their half of the bracket.

Each bout consisted of up to three rounds, lasting two minutes apiece. The wrestler who scored more points in each round was the winner of that rounds; the bout finished when one wrestler had won two rounds (and thus the match).

== Schedule ==
All times are China Standard Time (UTC+08:00)

Date	Time	Event
Thursday, 25 November 2010	09:30	1/8 finals
Thursday, 25 November 2010	09:30	Quarterfinals
Thursday, 25 November 2010	09:30	Semifinals
Thursday, 25 November 2010	16:00	Repechages
Thursday, 25 November 2010	17:00	Finals

== Results ==
Legend

- D — Disqualified

=== Main bracket ===
1/8 finals
Reza Yazdani (IRI)	1	6
Raja Al-Karrad (SYR)	0	0
Mausam Khatri (IND)	1	0
Taimuraz Tigiyev (KAZ)	3	1
Chinchuluuny Batchuluun (MGL)	4	4
La Baciren (CHN)	0	1
Sayed Khalid Hashemi (AFG)	0	0
Kim Jae-gang (KOR)	2	4

Quarterfinals
Farkhod Anakulov (TJK)	0	1
Kurban Kurbanov (UZB)	3	3
Takao Isokawa (JPN)	2	2
Faisal Al-Ketbi (UAE)	0	0
Reza Yazdani (IRI)	4	5
Taimuraz Tigiyev (KAZ)	1	1^{D}
Chinchuluuny Batchuluun (MGL)	0	0
Kim Jae-gang (KOR)	1	1

Semifinals
Kurban Kurbanov (UZB)	4	1
Takao Isokawa (JPN)	0	0
Reza Yazdani (IRI)	1	4
Kim Jae-gang (KOR)	0	0

Final
Kurban Kurbanov (UZB)	3	0	4
Reza Yazdani (IRI)	1	3	6

=== Repechage ===
Repechage round 1
Raja Al-Karrad (SYR)	0	3
Mausam Khatri (IND)	1	4

Bronze medals
Farkhod Anakulov (TJK)	0	0
Takao Isokawa (JPN)	3	1
Mausam Khatri (IND)	1	1
Kim Jae-gang (KOR)	1	1

- Taimuraz Tigiyev got disqualified due to infringement of the rules and was replaced by Mausam Khatri, who lost to Tigiyev in the previous round.

== Final standing ==
Rank	Athlete
1st place, gold medalist(s)	Reza Yazdani (IRI)
2nd place, silver medalist(s)	Kurban Kurbanov (UZB)
3rd place, bronze medalist(s)	Takao Isokawa (JPN)
3rd place, bronze medalist(s)	Mausam Khatri (IND)
5	Farkhod Anakulov (TJK)
5	Kim Jae-gang (KOR)
7	Chinchuluuny Batchuluun (MGL)
8	Raja Al-Karrad (SYR)
9	La Baciren (CHN)
10	Faisal Al-Ketbi (UAE)
11	Sayed Khalid Hashemi (AFG)
—	Taimuraz Tigiyev (KAZ)
