= Mausam Khatri =

Indian freestyle wrestler

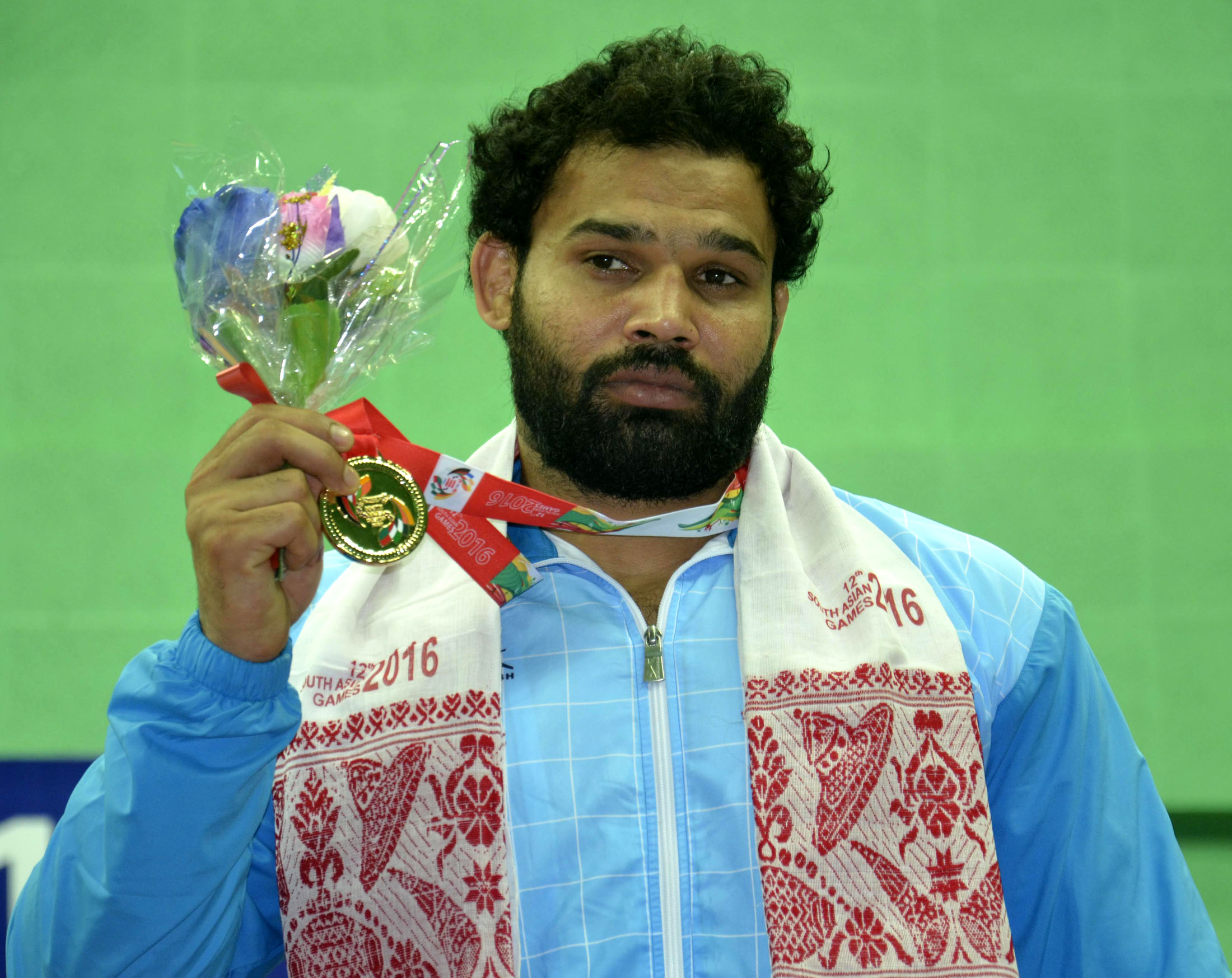
- Khatri in 2016

Personal information
- Nationality: Indian
- Born: 10 December 1990 (age 35) Panchi Jatan village, Sonipat district, Haryana, India
- Spouse: Ankita Punia

Sport
- Country: India
- Sport: Wrestling
- Event: Freestyle wrestling
- Coached by: Anoop Singh
Medal record
Men's Freestyle wrestling
Representing India
Asian Games
Bronze medal – third place	2010 Guangzhou	96 kg
Commonwealth Games
Silver medal – second place	2018 Gold Coast	97 kg Freestyle
Commonwealth Championships
Gold medal – first place	2009 Jalandhar	96 kg
Gold medal – first place	2011 Melbourne	96 kg
Silver medal – second place	2017 Johannesburg	97 kg
South Asian Games
Gold medal – first place	2016 Guwahati	97 kg
- Updated on 9 August 2016

Mausam Khatri (born 10 December 1990) is a freestyle wrestler from India. He was a bronze medallist in the 2010 Asian Games. He has also been Commonwealth champion twice, along with being the winner of gold medal in the 2016 South Asian Games.

Khatri made his international debut in 2006 at the cadet level. And after becoming national champion at the senior level in 2008, he has been regularly representing India in international tournaments at the 96 kg/97 kg freestyle event. He has twice represented India in the World Wrestling Championships.

Along with amateur wrestling, Khatri has also been active in the traditional Indian wrestling, where he has won Hind Kesari title five times. He serves as a police sub-inspector in his native state of Haryana.

== Early life ==
Khatri was born on 10 December 1990 in Panchi Jatan village of Haryana's Sonipat district and completed his education from Rohtak. His father Subeh Singh, who was a pehlwan, played an important role in promoting his inclination toward wrestling during his formative years. Later on, Anoop Singh coached him as a freestyle wrestler. After his podium finish at the 2010 Asian Games, the government of Haryana employed him as a sub-inspector in the Haryana Police under the Employment Guarantee Policy. He married Ankita Punia in June 2017.

== Career ==
=== 2006–09: Early career ===
Khatri made his international debut in the 2006 Asian Cadets Championship, where he won a silver medal. At the age of 18, while still being a junior wrestler, he competed in the 53rd edition of the Senior National Wrestling Championships in 2008. And he became the national champion after defeating Anil Mann in the final of the 96 kg freestyle event, although he could not defend his title in the next year – finishing with a bronze medal. He made his international debut at senior level in the 2009 Asian Wrestling Championships, finishing eighth.

In the 2009 Asian Junior Championship, he lost in the quarter-final to the eventual champion, which gave him a chance to win bronze medal via repechage. However, Khatri lost the bronze medal bout to Kazakhstan's Izmagambetov Gani. He next participated in the 2009 World Junior Wrestling Championship, where he lost in the second round to Germany's Johannes Kessel.

Although Khatri won gold medal at the Shaheed Bhagat Singh International Wrestling Tournament in November 2009, his first major success at the senior level came one month later when he became the Commonwealth Champion after defeating Pakistan's Mohammad Umar in the final.

=== 2010: Podium finish at the Asiad ===
In September 2010, during the selection trails for the Commonwealth Games at the national camp, several athletes, including Khatri, tested positive for the methylhexaneamine, a drug which was banned by the World Anti-Doping Agency (WADA) in 2010 itself. That resulted in his removal from the Commonwealth Games squad. However, due to declassification of the methylhexaneamine as a banned drug in September of the same year, the provisionally banned athletes were allowed to compete in the future tournaments. Nevertheless, hearing for the proposed ban kept going as they tested positive for the aforementioned drug during the period when it was classified as a banned stimulant. After getting temporary reprieve, he participated in the 44th edition of All India Wrestling Championship, where he won the Hind Kesari title after defeating Delhi's Nardener.

Khatri's campaign at the 2010 Asian Games began on a poor note as he lost to Kazakhstan's Taimuraz Tigiyev in his opening bout. However, the disqualification of Tigiyev in the quarter-final bout against the eventual gold medallist gave Khatri a chance of podium finish through repechage. In the first repechage bout, he defeated Syria’s Raja Al-Karrad and in the next bout, which would decide the bronze medal winner, he secured victory against Korea’s Kim Jae-gang.

=== 2011: Second Commonwealth Championships title ===
Mausam began his 2011 season with the 34th National Games. Representing Haryana, he won gold medal in the 96 kg freestyle event after defeating Jharkhand's Narendra in the final. In the Asian Championships, after getting bye in the first round, he lost to the eventual finalist Erfan Amiri in the second round. And he lost the bronze medal repechage bout against Mongolia's Natsagsürengiin Zolboo. In the 2011 Commonwealth Wrestling Championships, which was held in Melbourne, Khatri was able to successfully defend his title after winning the final bout against his countryman Varun Kumar. Participating in his career's first senior level World Championships, Khatri registered victories against Leon Rattigan and Harutyun Yenokyan in the first two rounds. However, he lost to Slovakia's Jozef Jaloviar in the pre-quarter-final.

=== 2012–15: Doping ban and comeback ===
In his first attempt to qualify for the 2012 Summer Olympics, he participated in the Asian OG Qualifying Tournament in March 2012, where he lost to Dorjkhandyn Khüderbulga in the quarter-final. In the next month, participating in the World OG Qualifying Tournament, he failed in his last bid for the Olympic qualification after losing in the pre-quarter-final.

After an extended hearing for the anti-doping violation, which continued since September 2010, Khatri was banned for two years in November 2012. However, Khatri appealed against the decision. And, after the hearing, the appellate body of National Anti-Doping Agency (NADA) reduced his ban duration by nine months citing "314 days of delay in the proceedings before the Disciplinary Panel not attributable to the athletes". Thus ending his ban in February 2014.

After the end of the ban, Khatri made comeback at the international circuit by participating in the 2015 Asian Wrestling Championships, where he reached to the quarter-final before losing to Japan's Takeshi Yamaguchi by 6–10. In his next tournament – Torneo Citta a Sassari – he finished with gold medal after defeating Canada's Ali Al-Rekabi in the final. He was part of the Indian team which finished fourth in the President Cup of Kazakhstan after losing to Kazakhstan in the bronze medal play off by 5–3. In that play off, he lost to Mamed İbragimov by 6–7.

In the 2015 World Wrestling Championships, he lost to Russia's Abdusalam Gadisov in the second round. His opponent's entry into the final gave him a chance to win bronze medal via repechage. However, he lost to Germany's Stefan Kehrer by 5–6 in the repechage bout, thereby ending his campaign. The inaugural edition of the Pro Wrestling League took place in December and the Team Punjab Royals successfully bid for Khatri. His team finished third in the league. At the 2015 Senior National Wrestling Championships, Khatri finished with a silver medal after losing to Satyawart Kadian in the final.

=== 2016: Gold at the South Asian Games ===
Representing India at the 2016 South Asian Games, which were held at Guwahati, he won gold medal defeating Afghanistan's Rajab Naseri in the final. However, his stint at the Asian Championships proved to be short-lived as he lost to Japan's Koki Yamamoto by 6–10 in the qualification round, finishing ninth in the tournament.

In March, Khatri participated in the inaugural edition of the Bharat Kesri Dangal, which offered the biggest ever cash award among all the domestic wrestling tournaments – carrying a prize of ₹1 crore (US$100,000) for the winner. The tournament, which was held at Gurgaon's Tau Devi Lal Stadium, saw participation of the country's top heavyweight wrestlers. He won the title defeating en route one of the strong title contenders Satyawart Kadian in the semifinal.

Vying to book an Olympic spot for India in the 97 kg category, he participated in the 2016 World Qualification Tournament. After securing victory against Nikolaos Papaoikonomou by 10–0 in the round of 16, he defeated Germany's Erik Thiele by 8–4 in the quarter-final. In the semifinal, he lost to Mongolia's Dorjkhandyn Khüderbulga by 6–8. And thereby missed the qualification as reaching the final was its prerequisite.
