= Yenokyan =

Yenokyan (Armenian: Ենոքյան) is an Armenian surname. Notable people with the surname include:

- Edgar Yenokyan (born 1986), Armenian Freestyle wrestler
- Gohar Yenokyan (1942–2019), Armenian politician, M.P.
- Harutyun Yenokyan (born 1985), Armenian Freestyle wrestler
