= J. D. Bergman =

American wrestler (born 1984)

J.D. Bergman
Personal information
- Born: September 7, 1984 (age 41) Oak Harbor, Ohio, U.S.

Sport
- Country: United States
- Sport: Wrestling
- Event(s): Freestyle and Folkstyle
- College team: Ohio State
- Team: USA
Medal record
Men's freestyle wrestling
Representing the United States
Yasar Dogu Tournament
Bronze medal – third place	2012 Ankara	96 kg
Waclaw Ziolkowski Memorial
Gold medal – first place	2012 Siedlce	96 kg
Granma Cup
Gold medal – first place	2015 Habana City	97 kg
Brazil Cup
Gold medal – first place	2014 Rio de Janeiro	97 kg
Men's collegiate wrestling
Representing the Ohio State Buckeyes
NCAA Division I Championships
Silver medal – second place	2008 St. Louis	285 lb
Bronze medal – third place	2004 St. Louis	197 lb

J.D. Bergman (born September 7, 1984) is an American former wrestler for New York Athletic Club, who represented the United States at the 2010 World Wrestling Championships and 2013 World Wrestling Championships.

== High school ==
Bergman attended Oak Harbor High School in Oak Harbor, Ohio, from 1999 to 2003. He won the individual state championship in the Ohio High School Athletic Association (OHSAA) Division II state tournament, winning state titles in 2002 and 2003. After an injury during his sophomore year, Bergman finished his junior and senior years undefeated (85-0), and holds the school record for most wins in a row, with 86.

== College ==
At Ohio State University, Bergman was a four-time NCAA qualifier and three-time NCAA placer, including finishing second in the 2008 NCAA Division I Wrestling Championships. Bergman also placed third as a true freshman in 2004 and fourth in 2007 as a junior. He finished his college career with 129 wins against 36 losses, for a 78% winning percentage.

== International ==
In 2010, Bergman represented the United States at the 2010 World Wrestling Championships in Moscow in the 96 kilogram weight class. Bergman split his matches, finishing in 10th place with a 1-1 record (besting Farkhod Anakulov of Tajikistan and losing to Iranian Erfan Amiri). Bergman again represented the US in the 2013 World Wrestling Championships, finishing 0-1 and in 25th place.

Bergman has been on seven USA World teams (top three finish in the World/Olympic trials); 2009–2011, 2012–2016 and 2005-2006 in Greco-Roman. Bergman is also a two-time Cerro Pelado champion (2010 and 2015) and a 2014 Brazil Cup champion.
