= Michel Batista (wrestler) =

Cuban Olympic wrestler and mixed martial artist

- Born: Michel Batista Martínez; April 20, 1984 (age 42); Camagüey, Cuba
- Height: 6 ft 3 in (1.91 m)
- Weight: 265 lb (120 kg)
- Division: Heavyweight
- Style: Wrestling, Freestyle
- Fighting out of: Miami, Florida, United States
- Team: American Top Team Kendall, Cerro Pelado
- Wrestling: Olympic Freestyle Wrestling
- Years active: 2007–present

Mixed martial arts record
- Total: 7
- Wins: 4
- By knockout: 2
- By decision: 2
- Losses: 2
- By submission: 2
- No contests: 1

Other information
- Mixed martial arts record from Sherdog

Michel Batista Martínez (born April 20, 1984) is a Cuban freestyle wrestler and mixed martial artist. He competed in the Ultimate Fighting Championship (UFC) in the heavyweight division and currently competes in M-1 Global.

== Wrestling ==
Batista competed for Cuba men's heavyweight wrestling category. He won a gold medal for his division at the 2007 Pan American Games in Rio de Janeiro, Brazil, defeating Venezuela's Luis Vivénes.

Batista represented Cuba at the 2008 Summer Olympics in Beijing, where he competed for the men's 96 kg class. He received an automatic free pass from the preliminary round of sixteen after U.S. wrestler Daniel Cormier had been withdrawn from the competition due to complications related to excessive weight cutting. He lost the quarterfinal match to Kazakhstan's Taimuraz Tigiyev, who was able to score three points in two straight periods, leaving Batista without a single point. Because his opponent advanced further into the final match, Batista offered another shot for the bronze medal by defeating his former opponent Vivenes in the repechage round. He progressed to the bronze medal match, but narrowly lost by a fall to Georgia's Giorgi Gogshelidze.

== Mixed martial arts career ==
=== Early career ===
Batista amassed a record of 4-0 prior join the TUF 28.

=== The Ultimate Fighter ===
In August 2018, it was announced that Batista was one of the fighters featured on The Ultimate Fighter 28, competing in the heavyweight division.

In the quarterfinals, Batista defeated Josh Parisian via technical knockout in the second round, allowing him to move on to the next stage of the competition. In the semifinals, Batista faced Justin Frazier. He lost the fight via technical knockout in round one.

=== Ultimate Fighting Championship ===
Batista faced Maurice Greene on November 30 in 2018 at The Ultimate Fighter: Heavy Hitters Finale. He lost fight via a triangle choke in round one.

== Mixed martial arts record ==
Professional record breakdown
7 matches	4 wins	2 losses
By knockout	2	0
By submission	0	2
By decision	2	0
No contests	1	

Res.	Record	Opponent	Method	Event	Date	Round	Time	Location	Notes
Loss	4–2 (1)	Yuriy Fedorov	Submission (guillotine choke)	M-1 Challenge 105	October 19, 2019	1	4:06	Nur-Sultan, Kazakhstan	
Loss	4–1 (1)	Maurice Greene	Submission (triangle choke)	The Ultimate Fighter: Heavy Hitters Finale	November 30, 2018	1	2:14	Las Vegas, Nevada, United States	
Win	4–0 (1)	Edison Lopes	Decision (unanimous)	Titan FC 47: Yusuff vs. Gomez	December 15, 2017	3	5:00	Fort Lauderdale, Florida, United States	
Win	3–0 (1)	Drew Stewart	Decision (unanimous)	Fight Time 35	February 17, 2017	3	5:00	Miami, Florida, United States	
NC	2–0 (1)	Oscar Delgado	NC (accidental eye poke)	Fight Time 34	December 16, 2016	1	N/A	Fort Lauderdale, Florida, United States	
Win	2–0	Andreas Danapas	TKO (punches)	Fight Time 30	April 22, 2016	2	4:32	Fort Lauderdale, Florida, United States	
Win	1–0	Russell Johnson	KO (punch)	World Fighting Championship 46	January 9, 2016	1	1:40	Baton Rouge, Louisiana, United States	Heavyweight debut.

== Mixed martial arts exhibition record ==
Exhibition record breakdown		
2 matches	1 win	1 loss
By knockout	1	1

Res.	Record	Opponent	Method	Event	Date	Round	Time	Location	Notes
Loss	1–1	Justin Frazier	TKO (punches)	The Ultimate Fighter 28	November 7, 2018 (airdate)	1	4:24	Las Vegas, Nevada, United States	The Ultimate Fighter 28 Semi-Final round.
Win	1–0	Josh Parisian	TKO (punches)	The Ultimate Fighter 28	September 27, 2018 (airdate)	2	2:50	Las Vegas, Nevada, United States	The Ultimate Fighter 28 Quarter-Final round.
