= Khadzhimurat Gatsalov =

Russian-ossetian wrestler (born 1982)

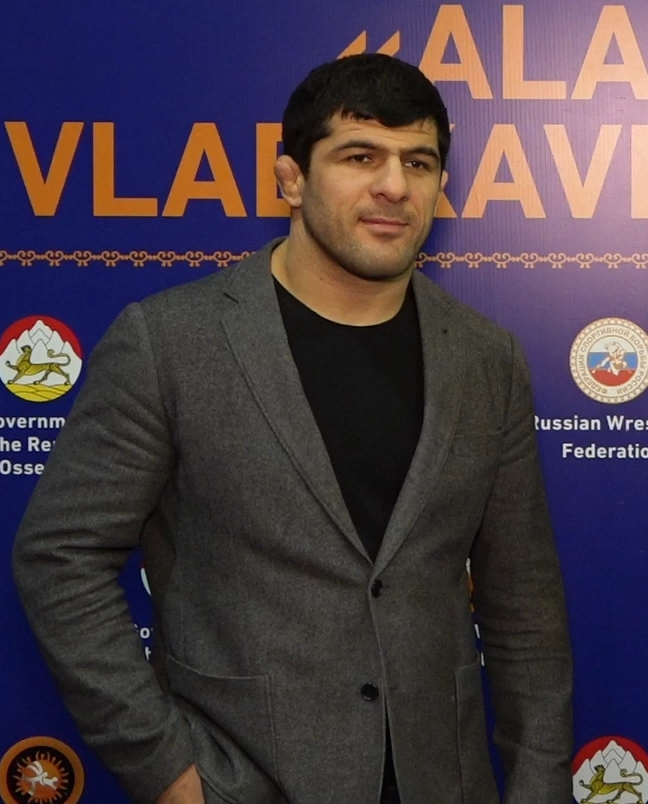
- Gatsalov in 2019

Personal information
- Native name: Хаджимурат Солтанович Гацалов
- Full name: Khadzhimurat Soltanovich Gatsalov
- Nationality: Russian
- Born: 11 December 1982 (age 43) Chikola, North Ossetian ASSR, Russian SFSR, Soviet Union
- Height: 1.78 m (5 ft 10 in)
- Weight: 125 kg (276 lb); 96 kg (212 lb)

Sport
- Country: Russia
- Sport: Wrestling
- Event: Freestyle
- Club: CSKA Wrestling Club; American Kickboxing Academy (formerly)
- Coached by: Vladislav Ceboev (1997–)
Medal record
Men's freestyle wrestling
Representing Russia
Olympic Games
Gold medal – first place	2004 Athens	96 kg
World Championships
Gold medal – first place	Budapest 2005	96 kg
Gold medal – first place	Guangzhou 2006	96 kg
Gold medal – first place	Baku 2007	96 kg
Gold medal – first place	Herning 2009	96 kg
Gold medal – first place	Budapest 2013	120 kg
Silver medal – second place	Moscow 2010	96 kg
Bronze medal – third place	Tashkent 2014	125 kg
European Championships
Gold medal – first place	2003 Riga	96 kg
Gold medal – first place	2004 Ankara	96 kg
Gold medal – first place	2006 Moscow	96 kg
Bronze medal – third place	2005 Varna	96 kg
Bronze medal – third place	2008 Tampere	96 kg
Representing North Ossetia–Alania
Russian Wrestling Championships
Gold medal – first place	2015 Dagestan	125 kg
Silver medal – second place	2016 Sakha	97 kg

Khadzhimurat Soltanovich Gatsalov (Russian: Хаджимурат Солтанович Гацалов; Digor Ossetian: Гуæцæлти Солтани фурт Хадзимурат; born December 11, 1982) is a Russian wrestler.

He won the gold medal in the freestyle 96 kg class in the 2004 Summer Olympics, defeating future UFC Light Heavyweight and Heavyweight Champion Daniel Cormier in the semi-finals. He won five world medals in the 96 kg class at the FILA Wrestling World Championships. In 2013, he moved up to the 120 kg class and won a gold medal at the FILA Wrestling World Championships. He started his senior level competitive career at 84 kg in 2002 before moving up to 96 kg and 120 kg.

In 2014, Gatsalov became Cormier's training partner ahead of Cormier's fight against Jon Jones at UFC 182.

As of November 2022, Gatsalov was appointed as the head coach of the Russian National Freestyle team.

In May 2025 Gatsalov received a provisional suspension by the ITA based on a sample from 2015 that contained banned substance ipamorelin.

In 2026, Khadzhimurat Gatsalov, who at that moment serves as the national freestyle wrestling coach of Russia, stated after the 2026 World Wrestling Championships in Astana, Kazakhstan, that he would no longer permit national team members to compete in the American professional league Real American Freestyle (RAF). Gatsalov explained that three wrestlers—Abdulrashid Sadulaev, Ibragim Kadiev, and Ismail Khaniev—who had taken part in RAF events were unable to properly prepare for the national team program because they had instead attended an RAF-oriented training camp. As a result, they missed the full preparation cycle held by the national team in the mountains. He emphasized a strict policy going forward: athletes selected through the Russian National Championships would only be allowed to compete in ranking tournaments designated by the coaching staff.
