= Saleh Emara =

Egyptian freestyle wrestler

Medal record

Men's Freestyle wrestling

Representing Egypt

Mediterranean Games
Gold medal – first place	2009 Pescara	96 kg

Saleh Emara (born 1 June 1982 in Monufia) is an Egyptian freestyle wrestler. He qualified to compete in the freestyle 96 kg event at the 2012 Summer Olympics, but he and fellow Egyptian wrestler Abdou Omar Abdou Ahmed forfeited their only matches after showing up late to their events.
