= Serhat Balcı =

Turkish freestyle wrestler

Personal information
- Nationality: Turkish
- Born: March 15, 1982 (age 44) Üsküdar, Istanbul, Turkey
- Height: 1.78 m (5 ft 10 in)
- Weight: 96 kg (212 lb)

Sport
- Sport: Sport wrestling
- Event: Freestyle wrestling
- Club: Sancaktepe Belediye SK
Medal record
Men's Freestyle wrestling
Representing Turkey
World Championships
Silver medal – second place	2011 Istanbul	96 kg
Bronze medal – third place	2009 Herning	96 kg
European Championships
Silver medal – second place	2005 Varna	84 kg
Bronze medal – third place	2007 Sofia	84 kg
Bronze medal – third place	2009 Vilnius	96 kg
Bronze medal – third place	2010 Baku	96 kg
Bronze medal – third place	2012 Belgrade	96 kg
Mediterranean Games
Gold medal – first place	2005 Almería	84 kg

Serhat Balcı (pronounced [ˈseɾhat ˈbaɫdʒɯ]; born March 15, 1982, in Üsküdar, Istanbul) is a male sport wrestler from Turkey competing in the 96 kg division of freestyle wrestling. The 1.78 m (5 ft 10 in) tall athlete is a member of the Sancaktepe Belediye S.K. in Sancaktepe, Istanbul.

Serhat Balcı holds a silver medal won at the 2011 World Wrestling Championships in Istanbul, Turkey and another silver medal won at the 2005 European Wrestling Championships in Varna, Bulgaria. He represented Turkey at the 2008 Summer Olympics without winning a medal.

He qualified for the participation at the 2012 Summer Olympics representing Turkey where he lost to Magomed Musaev of Dagestan.
