= Sinivie Boltic =

Nigerian sport wrestler

Personal information
- Born: 2 July 1982 (age 44) Famgbe, Nigeria

Sport
- Country: Nigeria
- Sport: Freestyle wrestling
Medal record
Commonwealth Games
Bronze medal – third place	2014 Glasgow	125 kg

Sinivie Boltic (born 2 July 1982 in Famgbe, Nigeria) is a Nigerian wrestler who competed in the freestyle 96 kg event at the 2012 Summer Olympics. He was the flag bearer of Nigeria during the opening ceremony.

Olympic Games
Preceded by Bose Kaffo	Flagbearer for Nigeria; London 2012	Succeeded by Olufunke Oshonaike
