= Ruslan Sheikhau =

Belarusian wrestler (born 1977)

Medal record

Men's Freestyle wrestling

Representing Belarus

World Championships
| Bronze medal – third place | 2006 Guangzhou | 96 kg |
| Bronze medal – third place | 2010 Moscow | 96 kg |
| Bronze medal – third place | 2011 Istanbul | 96 kg |

European Championships
| Silver medal – second place | 2007 Sofia | 96 kg |

Ruslan Sheikhau (Belarusian: Руслан Шэйхаў; born June 4, 1977, in Makhachkala, Dagestan ASSR, is a male wrestler from Belarus.
