= Giorgi Gogshelidze =

Georgian wrestler (born 1979)

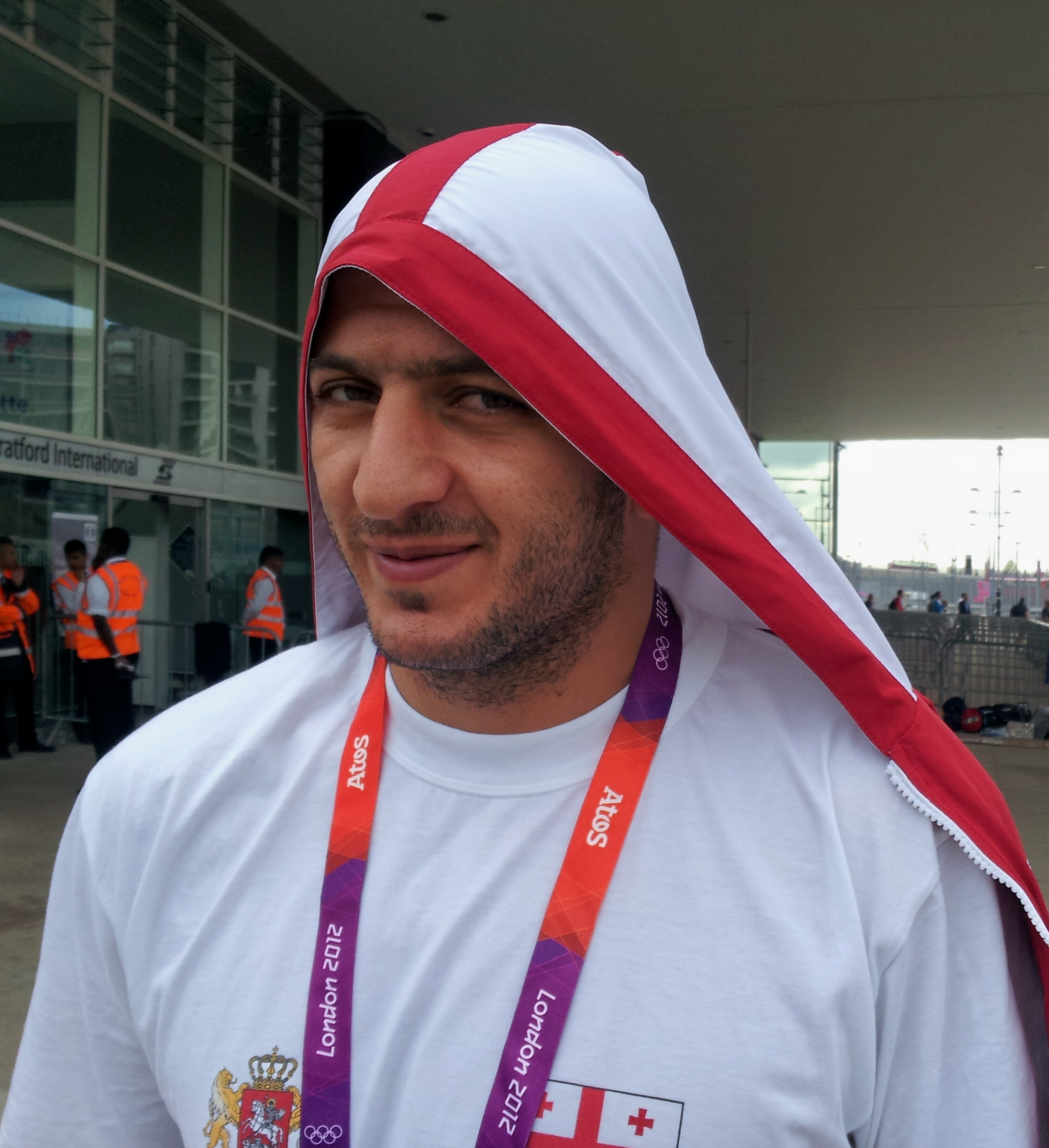
- Gogshelidze

Personal information
- Nationality: Georgia
- Born: 7 November 1979 (age 46) Gori, Georgian SSR, Soviet Union
- Height: 1.83 m (6 ft 0 in)
- Weight: 98 kg (216 lb; 15 st 6 lb)

Sport
- Country: Georgia(2006–present); Russia(1999–2004)
- Sport: Wrestling
- Event: Freestyle
- Club: Dynamo Tbilisi
- Coached by: Nugsar Shireli
Medal record
Men's freestyle wrestling
Representing Georgia
Olympic Games
Silver medal – second place	2008 Beijing	96 kg
Bronze medal – third place	2012 London	96 kg
World Championships
Silver medal – second place	2006 Guangzhou	96 kg
Bronze medal – third place	2009 Herning	96 kg
Bronze medal – third place	2010 Moscow	96 kg
European Championship
Gold medal – first place	2008 Tampere	96 kg
Silver medal – second place	2010 Baku	96 kg
Bronze medal – third place	2006 Moscow	96 kg
Bronze medal – third place	2007 Sofia	96 kg
Representing Russia
World Championships
Gold medal – first place	2001 Sofia	97 kg
European Championships
Silver medal – second place	2001 Budapest	97 kg
- Updated on 2 October 2014

Giorgi Gogshelidze (Georgian: გიორგი გოგშელიძე; born 7 November 1979 in Gori) is a Georgian wrestler, who has won a silver medal at the 2008 Summer Olympics and a bronze medal at the 2012 Summer Olympics.
