= Jake Varner =

American wrestler (born 1986)

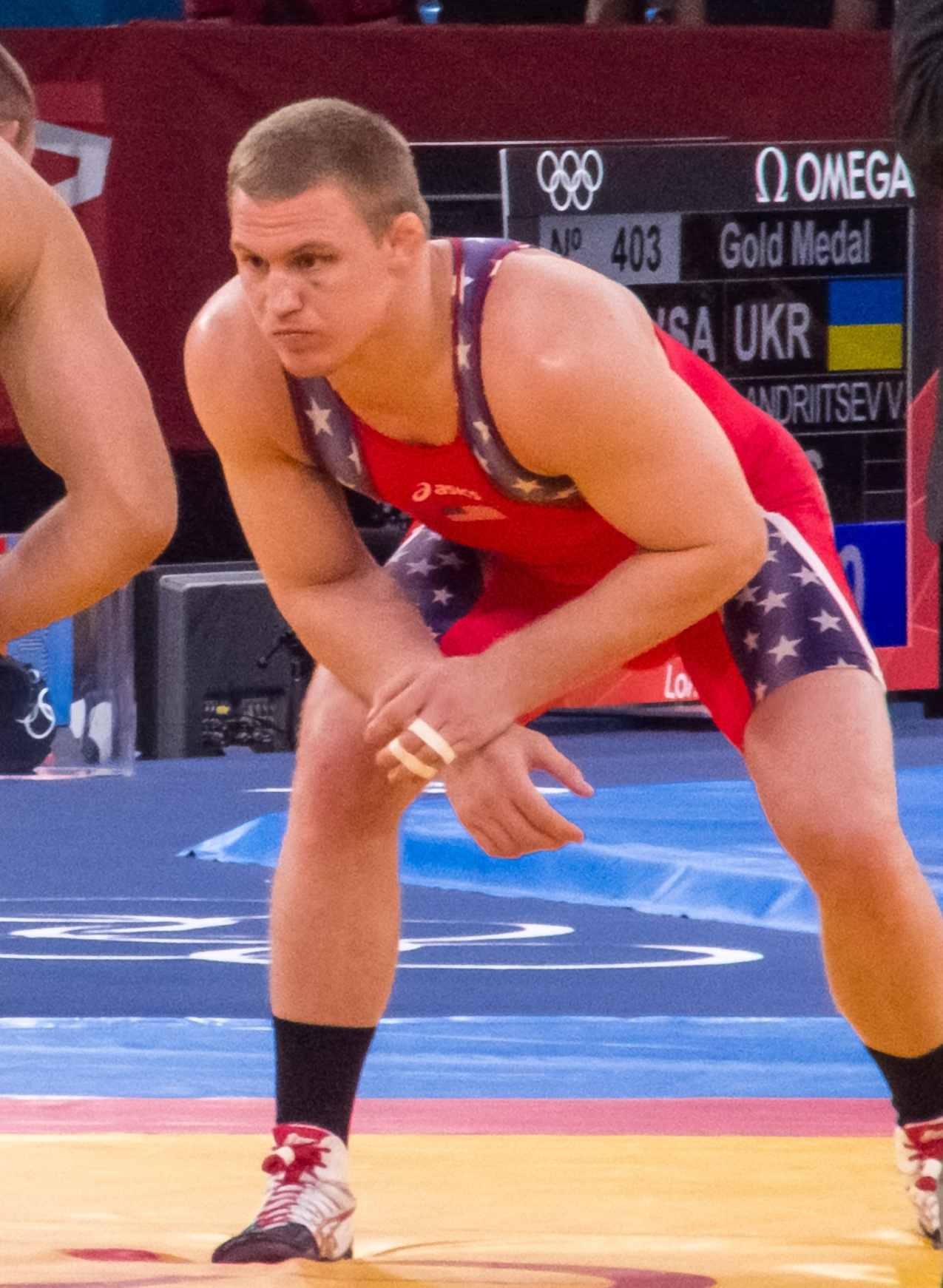
- Varner in 2012

Personal information
- Full name: Jacob Stephen Varner
- Born: March 24, 1986 (age 40) Bakersfield, California, U.S.
- Height: 6 ft 1 in (185 cm)
- Weight: 96 kg (212 lb)

Sport
- Country: United States
- Sport: Wrestling
- Events: Freestyle and Folkstyle
- College team: Iowa State
- Club: Nittany Lion Wrestling Club
- Team: USA
- Coached by: Cael Sanderson
Medal record
Men's freestyle wrestling
Representing the United States
Olympic Games
Gold medal – first place	2012 London	96 kg
World Championships
Bronze medal – third place	2011 Istanbul	96 kg
Pan American Games
Gold medal – first place	2011 Guadalajara	96 kg
Golden Grand Prix Ivan Yarygin
Silver medal – second place	2016 Krasnoyarsk	97 kg
Men's collegiate wrestling
Representing the Iowa State Cyclones
NCAA Division I Championships
Gold medal – first place	2009 St. Louis	197 lb
Gold medal – first place	2010 Omaha	197 lb
Silver medal – second place	2007 Auburn Hills	184 lb
Silver medal – second place	2008 St. Louis	184 lb

Jacob Stephen "Jake" Varner (born March 24, 1986) is an American wrestler. Varner won the gold medal in the 96 kg category at the 2012 Summer Olympics in freestyle wrestling.

Varner wrestled collegiately for the Iowa State University Cyclones. He was a four-time NCAA Division I finalist and two-time NCAA Division I champion (junior and senior). In high school, he was also a two-time California wrestling state champion for Bakersfield High School in Bakersfield, California, where was coached by his cousin Andy, who served as head coach, and his father Steve, who served as an assistant. His performance in 2005 earned him the Junior Schalles Award for top high school pinner.

Varner served as an assistant wrestling coach at Penn State from 2016 to 2021. In November 2021, Varner was promoted to head the Penn State Olympic Regional Training Center (RTC), also known as the Nittany Lion Wrestling Club.

In 2022, Varner was inducted into the National Wrestling Hall of Fame as a Distinguished Member.

Varner defeated Pat Downey by decision at RAF 02 on October 25, 2025.

== See also ==
- List of Pennsylvania State University Olympians
