= Edgar Yenokyan =

Armenian wrestler

Personal information
- Born: 8 May 1987 (age 39) Armenia
- Height: 1.82 m (5 ft 11 1/2 in)
- Weight: 96 kg (212 lb)

Sport
- Sport: Wrestling
- Event: Freestyle
- Club: SC Yerevan
- Coached by: Esik Imatunyan
Medal record
Representing Armenia
Men's Freestyle Wrestling
European Championship
Bronze medal – third place	2009 Vilnius	96 kg

Edgar Yenokyan (Armenian: Էդգար Ենոքյան, 20 July 1986) is an Armenian freestyle wrestler. He won a bronze medal at the 2009 European Wrestling Championships in Vilnius.
