= Kim Jae-gang =

South Korean freestyle wrestler

Kim Jae-Gang
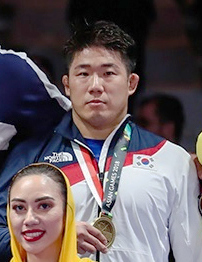
- Kim at the 2018 Asian Games

Personal information
- Nationality: South Korea
- Born: 16 August 1987 (age 38) Daegu, South Korea
- Height: 1.78 m (5 ft 10 in)
- Weight: 98 kg (216 lb)

Sport
- Sport: Wrestling
- Event: Freestyle
- Club: Yeungnam University Sports Club, Daegu; Songchin Sports Club, Seoul
- Coached by: Bak Uo; Park Jang-Soon
Medal record
Representing South Korea
Asian Games
| Bronze medal – third place | 2018 Jakarta | 97 kg |
Asian Championships
| Gold medal – first place | 2013 Delhi | 96 kg |
| Silver medal – second place | 2012 Gumi | 96 kg |
| Bronze medal – third place | 2018 Bishkek | 97 kg |
| Bronze medal – third place | 2015 Doha | 97 kg |
| Bronze medal – third place | 2010 Delhi | 96 kg |

Kim Jae-Gang (Korean: 김재강; born August 16, 1987) is a South Korean heavyweight freestyle wrestler. He won a bronze medal at the 2018 Asian Games and a gold medal at the 2013 Asian Championships. Kim has a degree in physical education from the Yeungnam University. In 2014 he was named the Best Athlete of the Year by the Gyeongsangbuk-do Sports Council in Republic of Korea.

At the 2008 Summer Olympics, Kim competed in the 120 kg division. He received a bye for the preliminary round of sixteen match, before losing out to Marid Mutalimov, who was able to score three points in two straight periods, leaving Kim with a single point.
