= Takao Isokawa =

Japanese freestyle wrestler

Takao Isokawa (born 10 June 1984 in Kumamoto) is a Japanese freestyle wrestler. He competed in the freestyle 96 kg event at the 2012 Summer Olympics; after defeating Nathaniel Tuamoheloa in the qualifications, he was eliminated by Magomed Musaev in the 1/8 finals.
