= Kurban Kurbanov =

Uzbek freestyle wrestler from Russia (born 1985)

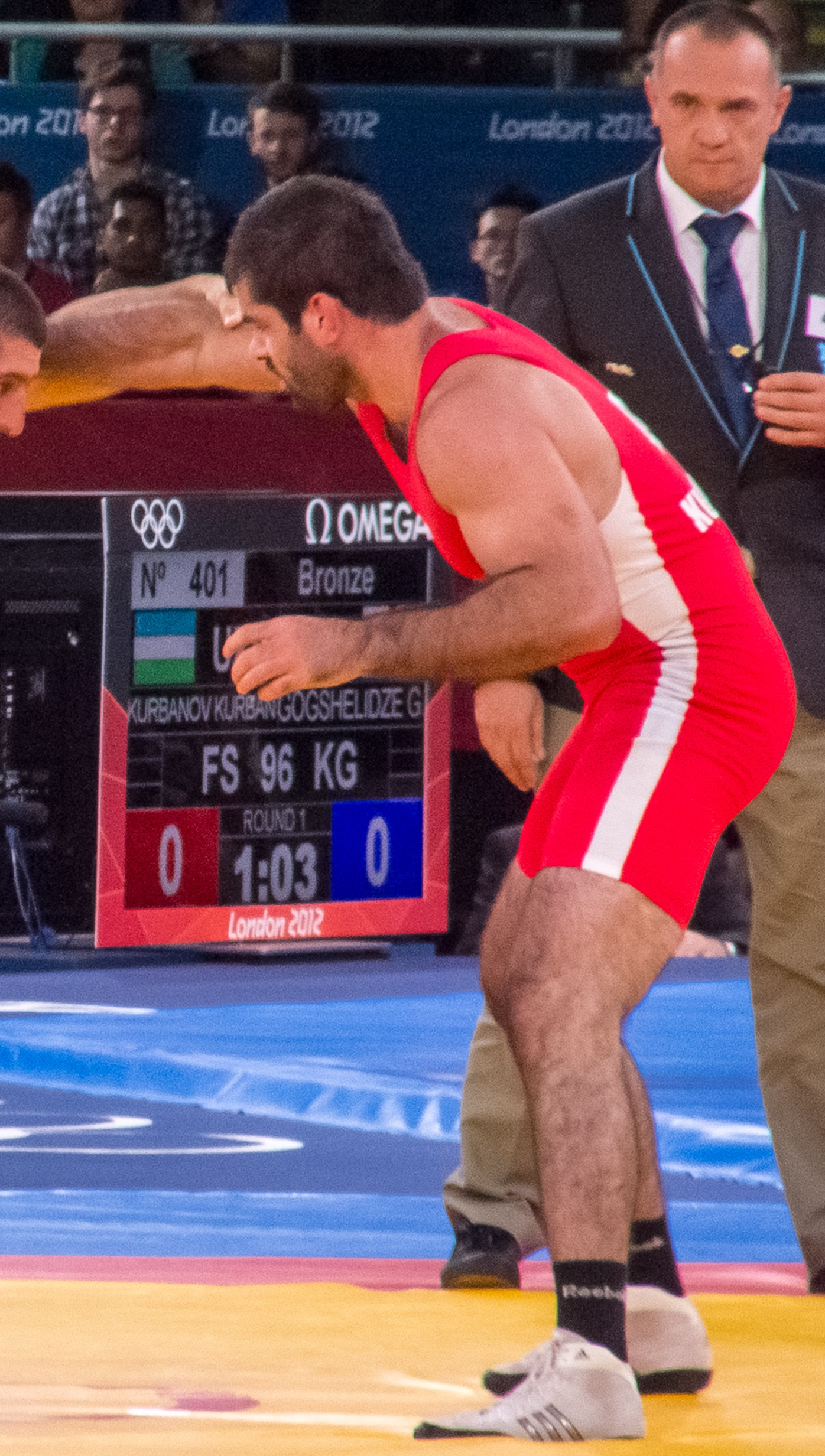
- Kurbanov in 2012

Personal information
- Born: 21 March 1985 (age 41) Makhachkala, Dagestan, Russia
- Height: 188 cm (6 ft 2 in)
- Weight: 96 kg (212 lb)

Sport
- Sport: Freestyle wrestling
- Club: Dynamo Toshkent; Gamid Gamidov Wrestling club
Medal record
Representing Uzbekistan
World Championships
| Bronze medal – third place | 2007 Baku | -96 kg |
Asian Games
| Silver medal – second place | 2010 Guangzhou | 96 kg |
Asian Championships
| Gold medal – first place | 2008 Jeju City | 96 kg |

Kurban Kurbanov (Russian: Курбан Курбанов; born 21 March 1985 in Makhachkala, Dagestan) is an Uzbek freestyle wrestler from Russia. He competed at the 2008 and 2012 Summer Olympics in the 96 kg category and finished in seventh and fifth place, respectively. He was the silver medalist at the 2010 Asian Games. He won the 2011 Asian Freestyle Wrestling Championship. He trains in Gamid Gamidov Wrestling club.
