= Khetag Pliev =

Russian–Canadian boxer and freestyle wrestler

Personal information
- Nationality: Canadian
- Born: February 20, 1984 (age 42) Alagir, North Ossetia-Alania, Russia
- Height: 182 cm (6 ft 0 in)
- Weight: Cruiserweight

Boxing career
- Stance: Orthodox

Boxing record
- Total fights: 6
- Wins: 5
- Win by KO: 2
- Losses: 1
- No contests: 1
Medal record
Men's freestyle wrestling
Representing Canada
Pan American Games
Bronze medal – third place	2015 Guadalajara	96 kg

Khetag Aleksandrovich Pliev (Russian: Хетаг Александрович Плиев; born February 20, 1984) is a Russian–born Canadian professional boxer, freestyle wrestler and mixed martial artist who competed for Canada.

In 2012, Pliev was awarded the silver medal at the Marika tournament, qualifying him to compete at the 2012 Summer Olympics, where he came in 10th in the 96 kg weight category. He is a four-time Canadian National Champion, Ohio State champion (1999-2002), U.S. Junior open champion 2002. He had his professional boxing debut in 2017.

On April 1, 2021, Pliev’s finger became detached from his hand during an MMA bout. The finger was later recovered and reattached.
