= 2009 World Junior Wrestling Championships =

Junior Wrestling Championships

- Host city: Ankara, Turkey
- Dates: 3–9 August 2009

Champions
- Freestyle: Russia
- Greco-Roman: Iran
- Women: Russia

The 2009 World Junior Wrestling Championships were the 33rd edition of the World Junior Wrestling Championships and were held in Ankara, Turkey between 3–9 August 2009.

== Medal table ==
Rank	Nation	Gold	Silver	Bronze	Total
1	Russia	5	8	7	20
2	Iran	5	1	3	9
3	Azerbaijan	3	3	3	9
4	Turkey	2	1	3	6
5	Ukraine	2	1	2	5
5	United States	2	1	2	5
7	Kazakhstan	1	2	0	3
8	Japan	1	1	2	4
9	Cuba	1	1	0	2
10	Sweden	1	0	2	3
11	Uzbekistan	1	0	1	2
12	Georgia	0	1	2	3
12	Germany	0	1	2	3
14	India	0	1	1	2
15	Latvia	0	1	0	1
15	Romania	0	1	0	1
17	Armenia	0	0	3	3
17	Tunisia	0	0	3	3
19	Finland	0	0	2	2
19	Poland	0	0	2	2
21	Belarus	0	0	1	1
21	Bulgaria	0	0	1	1
21	Estonia	0	0	1	1
21	France	0	0	1	1
21	Kyrgyzstan	0	0	1	1
21	Moldova	0	0	1	1
21	Mongolia	0	0	1	1
21	South Korea	0	0	1	1
Totals (28 entries)		24	24	48	96

== Medal summary ==
=== Men's freestyle ===
Event	Gold	Silver	Bronze
50 kg	Ahmet Peker; Turkey	Rustam Ampar; Russia	Nodiryon Safarov; Uzbekistan
50 kg	Ahmet Peker; Turkey	Rustam Ampar; Russia	Anatolii Buruian; Moldova
55 kg	Hassan Rahimi; Iran	Rahul Aware; India	Mikhail Ivanov; Russia
55 kg	Hassan Rahimi; Iran	Rahul Aware; India	Yashar Aliyev; Azerbaijan
60 kg	Timur Tsabolov; Russia	Aghahuseyn Mustafayev; Azerbaijan	Jordan Oliver; United States
60 kg	Timur Tsabolov; Russia	Aghahuseyn Mustafayev; Azerbaijan	Jalil Lashani; Iran
66 kg	Jabrayil Hasanov; Azerbaijan	Devid Safaryan; Russia	Saba Bolaghi; Germany
66 kg	Jabrayil Hasanov; Azerbaijan	Devid Safaryan; Russia	Stanislav Zinchenko; Ukraine
74 kg	Saeid Tavakoli; Iran	Magomed Zubairov; Russia	Andrew Howe; United States
74 kg	Saeid Tavakoli; Iran	Magomed Zubairov; Russia	Andrey Nagorny; Ukraine
84 kg	Koloi Kartoev; Russia	Aslanbek Alborov; Azerbaijan	Dato Marsagishvili; Georgia
84 kg	Koloi Kartoev; Russia	Aslanbek Alborov; Azerbaijan	Muharrem Erşahin; Turkey
96 kg	Erfan Amiri; Iran	Jamaladdin Magomedov; Azerbaijan	Fatih Yaşarlı; Turkey
96 kg	Erfan Amiri; Iran	Jamaladdin Magomedov; Azerbaijan	Vladislav Baitcaev; Russia
120 kg	Dominique Bradley; United States	Giorgi Sakandelidze; Georgia	Mikhail Gazayev; Azerbaijan
120 kg	Dominique Bradley; United States	Giorgi Sakandelidze; Georgia	Hamid Reza Rezaei; Iran

=== Greco-Roman ===
Event	Gold	Silver	Bronze
50 kg	Artur Umbetkaliev; Kazakhstan	Javier Duménigo; Cuba	Khurshud Babashov; Azerbaijan
50 kg	Artur Umbetkaliev; Kazakhstan	Javier Duménigo; Cuba	Eduard Simonyan; Russia
55 kg	Orhan Ahmadov; Azerbaijan	Mohammad Hatami; Iran	Aleksander Mikaelyan; Armenia
55 kg	Orhan Ahmadov; Azerbaijan	Mohammad Hatami; Iran	Kanybek Zholchubekov; Kyrgyzstan
60 kg	Hasan Aliyev; Azerbaijan	Rahman Bilici; Turkey	Archil Turmanidze; Georgia
60 kg	Hasan Aliyev; Azerbaijan	Rahman Bilici; Turkey	Grigory Yavruyan; Russia
66 kg	Saeid Abdevali; Iran	Migran Arutyunyan; Russia	Hovhannes Varderesyan; Armenia
66 kg	Saeid Abdevali; Iran	Migran Arutyunyan; Russia	Frank Staebler; Germany
74 kg	Azizibek Murodov; Uzbekistan	Doszhan Kartikov; Kazakhstan	Damian Janikowski; Poland
74 kg	Azizibek Murodov; Uzbekistan	Doszhan Kartikov; Kazakhstan	Kim Jin-Hyeok; South Korea
84 kg	Babak Ghorbani; Iran	Alan Khugayev; Russia	Artur Aleksanyan; Armenia
84 kg	Babak Ghorbani; Iran	Alan Khugayev; Russia	Tuomas Tarino; Finland
96 kg	Yasmany Lugo; Cuba	Efe Coşkun; Germany	Islam Magomedov; Russia
96 kg	Yasmany Lugo; Cuba	Efe Coşkun; Germany	Mikhail Danilov; Belarus
120 kg	Rıza Kayaalp; Turkey	Vladimir Ilnitski; Russia	Taisto Lalli; Finland
120 kg	Rıza Kayaalp; Turkey	Vladimir Ilnitski; Russia	Bashir Babajanzadeh; Iran

=== Women's freestyle ===
Event	Gold	Silver	Bronze
44 kg	Victoria Anthony; United States	Chiaki Fujikawa; Japan	Anastasia Tabaeva; Russia
44 kg	Victoria Anthony; United States	Chiaki Fujikawa; Japan	Sümeyye Sezer; Turkey
48 kg	Fuyuko Mimura; Japan	Liubov Salnikova; Russia	Naziha Hamza; Tunisia
48 kg	Fuyuko Mimura; Japan	Liubov Salnikova; Russia	Mélanie Lesaffre; France
51 kg	Valeriya Chepsarakova; Russia	Zulfia Yakhyarova; Kazakhstan	Hedia Trabelsi; Tunisia
51 kg	Valeriya Chepsarakova; Russia	Zulfia Yakhyarova; Kazakhstan	Davaasükhiin Otgontsetseg; Mongolia
55 kg	Yuliya Khavaldzhy; Ukraine	Anastasija Grigorjeva; Latvia	Marwa Amri; Tunisia
55 kg	Yuliya Khavaldzhy; Ukraine	Anastasija Grigorjeva; Latvia	Renata Omilusik; Poland
59 kg	Ekaterina Melnikova; Russia	Iryna Husyak; Ukraine	Yurika Ito; Japan
59 kg	Ekaterina Melnikova; Russia	Iryna Husyak; Ukraine	Taybe Yusein; Bulgaria
63 kg	Henna Johansson; Sweden	Veronica Carlson; United States	Anastasia Bratchikova; Russia
63 kg	Henna Johansson; Sweden	Veronica Carlson; United States	Ayaka Sato; Japan
67 kg	Alina Berezhna; Ukraine	Yuliya Alborova; Russia	Sandra Mäkelä; Sweden
67 kg	Alina Berezhna; Ukraine	Yuliya Alborova; Russia	Navjot Kaur; India
72 kg	Natalia Vorobieva; Russia	Roxana Iancolovici; Romania	Emma Weberg; Sweden
72 kg	Natalia Vorobieva; Russia	Roxana Iancolovici; Romania	Epp Mäe; Estonia
