= 2013 European Wrestling Championships – Men's Greco-Roman 55 kg =

The men's Greco-Roman 55 kg is a competition featured at the 2013 European Wrestling Championships, and was held at the Tbilisi Sports Palace in Tbilisi, Georgia on 23 March 2013.

== Medalists ==
Gold	Elbek Tazhyieu; Belarus
Silver	Elchin Aliyev; Azerbaijan
Bronze	Bekkhan Mankiev; Russia
Bronze	Fatih Üçüncü; Turkey

== Results ==
Legend

- F — Won by fall

=== Final ===
Final
Elbek Tazhyieu (BLR)	0	1	4
Elchin Aliyev (AZE)	1	0	0

=== Top Half ===
Round of 32

Round of 16
Bekkhan Mankiev (RUS)	1	6
João Carvalho (POR)	0	0
Harutyun Hovhannisyan (ARM)	4	3
Fabian Schmitt (GER)	0	1
Anar Zeinalov (EST)	0	1
Elbek Tazhyieu (BLR)	2	1
Dávid Borsos (HUN)	0	0
Aleksandar Kostadinov (BUL)	1	1

Quarterfinals
Bekkhan Mankiev (RUS)	2	1
Harutyun Hovhannisyan (ARM)	0	0
Elbek Tazhyieu (BLR)	0	1	2
Aleksandar Kostadinov (BUL)	1	0	0

Semifinals
Bekkhan Mankiev (RUS)	0	1	0
Elbek Tazhyieu (BLR)	1	0	1

=== Bottom Half ===
Round of 32
Joakim Fagerlund (SWE)	0	2
Victor Ciobanu (MDA)	3	2

Round of 16
Elchin Aliyev (AZE)	4	5
Kristan Gazdag (SRB)	0	0
Lasha Gogitadze (GEO)	1	1	1
Fatih Üçüncü (TUR)	1	1	1
Thomas Rønningen (NOR)	2	2
Sergii Storozhenko (UKR)	0	0
Andriy Tsaryuk (ISR)	1	0
Victor Ciobanu (MDA)	2	2

Quarterfinals
Elchin Aliyev (AZE)	1	2
Fatih Üçüncü (TUR)	0	0
Thomas Rønningen (NOR)	1	0	0
Victor Ciobanu (MDA)	1	3	4

Semifinals
Elchin Aliyev (AZE)	1	0	6
Victor Ciobanu (MDA)	0	6	0

=== Repechage ===
Repechage round 2
Anar Zeinalov (EST)	2	0	1
Aleksandar Kostadinov (BUL)	0	2	2
Kristan Gazdag (SRB)	2	0	0
Fatih Üçüncü (TUR)	2	6	1

Bronze medals
Aleksandar Kostadinov (BUL)	0	0
Bekkhan Mankiev (RUS)	3	2
Fatih Üçüncü (TUR)	1	1
Victor Ciobanu (MDA)	0	0
