= 2013 European Wrestling Championships – Women's freestyle 48 kg =

The women's freestyle 48 kg is a competition featured at the 2013 European Wrestling Championships, and was held at the Tbilisi Sports Palace in Tbilisi, Georgia on 19 March 2013.

== Medalists ==
Gold	Valeriya Chepsarakova; Russia
Silver	Yana Stadnik; Great Britain
Bronze	Jaqueline Schellin; Germany
Bronze	Patimat Bagomedova; Azerbaijan

== Results ==
Legend

- F — Won by fall

=== Final ===
Final
Valeriya Chepsarakova (RUS)	1	1
Yana Stadnik (GBR)	0	0

=== Top Half ===
Round of 32

Round of 16
Sümeyye Sezer (TUR)	0	3	3
Silvia Felice (ITA)	1	0	1
Mercédesz Dénes (HUN)	0	1	3
Henriette Slattum (NOR)	1	0	0
Jaqueline Schellin (GER)	2	5^{F}
Nekane Cepas (ESP)	0	0
Alina Ryzhour (BLR)	0	0
Valeriya Chepsarakova (RUS)	1	2

Quarterfinals
Sümeyye Sezer (TUR)	1	6
Mercédesz Dénes (HUN)	0	0
Jaqueline Schellin (GER)	0	1
Valeriya Chepsarakova (RUS)	1	2

Semifinals
Sümeyye Sezer (TUR)	0	0
Valeriya Chepsarakova (RUS)	0	4

=== Bottom Half ===
Round of 32
Alina Vuc (ROU)	1	1	0
Elitsa Yankova (BUL)	1	5	4^{F}

Round of 16
Anna Łukasiak (POL)	1	4
Yana Stadnik (GBR)	2	4
Liliana Santos (POR)	0	0
Fredrika Petersson (SWE)	3	1
Mélanie Lesaffre (FRA)	0	0
Mariya Livach (UKR)	3	1
Patimat Bagomedova (AZE)	2	2
Elitsa Yankova (BUL)	0	0

Quarterfinals
Yana Stadnik (GBR)	4^{F}
Fredrika Petersson (SWE)	0
Mariya Livach (UKR)	0
Patimat Bagomedova (AZE)	4^{F}

Semifinals
Yana Stadnik (GBR)	3	1
Patimat Bagomedova (AZE)	0	0

=== Repechage ===
Repechage round 2
Alina Ryzhour (BLR)	3	0	3
Jaqueline Schellin (GER)	1	1	5
Anna Łukasiak (POL)	4	1	1
Fredrika Petersson (SWE)	0	2	0

Bronze medals
Jaqueline Schellin (GER)	1	0	2
Sümeyye Sezer (TUR)	0	1	1
Anna Łukasiak (POL)	0	0
Patimat Bagomedova (AZE)	4	2
