= 2010 European Juniors Wrestling Championships =

Wrestling championship

- Host city: Bulgaria, Samokov
- Dates: 28 June – 4 July 2010

Champions
- Freestyle: Russia
- Greco-Roman: Georgia
- Women: Ukraine

The 2010 European Juniors Wrestling Championships was held in Samokov, Bulgaria between 28 June – 4 July 2010.

== Medal table ==
* Host nation (Bulgaria)

Rank	Nation	Gold	Silver	Bronze	Total
1	Russia	6	2	6	14
2	Azerbaijan	4	3	3	10
3	Georgia	3	4	1	8
4	Turkey	2	4	7	13
5	Ukraine	2	3	6	11
6	Germany	2	2	3	7
7	Moldova	2	0	0	2
8	Hungary	1	0	2	3
9	Greece	1	0	0	1
9	Romania	1	0	0	1
11	Bulgaria*	0	1	4	5
12	Armenia	0	1	1	2
12	Sweden	0	1	1	2
14	France	0	1	0	1
14	Netherlands	0	1	0	1
14	Switzerland	0	1	0	1
17	Poland	0	0	5	5
18	Belarus	0	0	4	4
19	Estonia	0	0	1	1
19	Finland	0	0	1	1
19	Latvia	0	0	1	1
19	Slovakia	0	0	1	1
Totals (22 entries)		24	24	47	95

== Team ranking ==
Rank	Men's freestyle		Men's Greco-Roman		Women's freestyle	
Rank	Team	Points	Team	Points	Team	Points
1	Russia	59	Georgia	48	Ukraine	47
2	Turkey	57	Turkey	47	Germany	38
3	Georgia	54	Russia	45	Russia	38
4	Ukraine	53	Armenia	41	Turkey	38
5	Azerbaijan	44	Azerbaijan	38	Poland	37

== Medal summary ==
=== Men's freestyle ===
Event	Gold	Silver	Bronze
50 kg	(Moldova) Anatolii Buruian	(Russia) Magomed Magomedaliev	(Turkey) Nebi Uzun
50 kg	(Moldova) Anatolii Buruian	(Russia) Magomed Magomedaliev	(Georgia (country)) Lasha Talakhadze
55 kg	(Azerbaijan) Toghrul Asgarov	(Georgia (country)) Vladimer Khinchegashvili	(Bulgaria) Krum Chuchurov
55 kg	(Azerbaijan) Toghrul Asgarov	(Georgia (country)) Vladimer Khinchegashvili	(Russia) Rustam Ampar
60 kg	(Russia) Anvar Gazimagomedov	(Georgia (country)) Tengiz Chochishvili	(Germany) Philipp Herzog
60 kg	(Russia) Anvar Gazimagomedov	(Georgia (country)) Tengiz Chochishvili	(Azerbaijan) Umud Mammadov
66 kg	(Greece) Alexandros Samanidis	(Turkey) Mustafa Kaya	(Ukraine) Andriy Kvyatkovskyi
66 kg	(Greece) Alexandros Samanidis	(Turkey) Mustafa Kaya	(Azerbaijan) David Suynyuchkhanov
74 kg	(Georgia (country)) Davit Khutsishvili	(Turkey) Soner Demirtaş	(Russia) Zaur Makiev
74 kg	(Georgia (country)) Davit Khutsishvili	(Turkey) Soner Demirtaş	(Ukraine) Oleg Zakharevych
84 kg	(Russia) Koloy Kortoev	(Turkey) İbrahim Bölükbaşı	(Poland) Robert Baran
84 kg	(Russia) Koloy Kortoev	(Turkey) İbrahim Bölükbaşı	(Germany) Ludwig Pscherer
96 kg	(Russia) Vladislav Baitcaev	(Azerbaijan) Khangerey Asiyatilov	(Ukraine) Oleksandr Khotsianivskyi
96 kg	(Russia) Vladislav Baitcaev	(Azerbaijan) Khangerey Asiyatilov	(Turkey) Fatih Yaşarlı
120 kg	(Georgia (country)) Giorgi Sakandelidze	(Azerbaijan) Aslan Dzebisov	(Belarus) Ihar Dziatko
120 kg	(Georgia (country)) Giorgi Sakandelidze	(Azerbaijan) Aslan Dzebisov	(Ukraine) Muradyn Kushkhov

=== Men's Greco-Roman ===
Event	Gold	Silver	Bronze
50 kg	(Azerbaijan) Eldaniz Azizli	(Georgia (country)) Tornike Makharadze	(Bulgaria) Nikolay Vichev
50 kg	(Azerbaijan) Eldaniz Azizli	(Georgia (country)) Tornike Makharadze	(Turkey) Tolgahan Karataş
55 kg	(Turkey) Kürşat Kiraz	(Ukraine) Dmytro Tsymbaliuk	(Finland) Jari Ohukainen
55 kg	(Turkey) Kürşat Kiraz	(Ukraine) Dmytro Tsymbaliuk	(Poland) Dawid Ersetic
60 kg	(Azerbaijan) Kamran Mammadov	(Ukraine) Lenur Temirov	(Russia) Ildus Yamukov
60 kg	(Azerbaijan) Kamran Mammadov	(Ukraine) Lenur Temirov	(Turkey) Hasan Özkul
66 kg	(Azerbaijan) Rasul Chunayev	(Georgia (country)) Sachino Davitaia	(Russia) Zamir Zagashtokov
66 kg	(Azerbaijan) Rasul Chunayev	(Georgia (country)) Sachino Davitaia	(Armenia) Gevorg Sahakyan
74 kg	(Hungary) Viktor Lőrincz	(Sweden) Alexander Jersgren	(Russia) Bilan Nalgiev
74 kg	(Hungary) Viktor Lőrincz	(Sweden) Alexander Jersgren	(Poland) Mateusz Wolny
84 kg	(Turkey) Aslan Atem	(Armenia) Artur Aleksanyan	(Bulgaria) Stanislav Kanev
84 kg	(Turkey) Aslan Atem	(Armenia) Artur Aleksanyan	(Sweden) Tobias Kvarnmark
96 kg	(Georgia (country)) Vasil Imerlishvili	(Germany) Efe Coşkun	(Hungary) Rizmajer György
96 kg	(Georgia (country)) Vasil Imerlishvili	(Germany) Efe Coşkun	(Russia) Zelimkhan Belkharoev
120 kg	(Russia) David Oganesyan	(Bulgaria) Lyubomir Dimitrov	(Turkey) Engin Dağlı
120 kg	(Russia) David Oganesyan	(Bulgaria) Lyubomir Dimitrov	(Belarus) Kiryl Hryshchanka

=== Women's freestyle ===
Event	Gold	Silver	Bronze
44 kg	(Russia) Nadezhda Fedorova	(Azerbaijan) Marziget Bagomedova	(Poland) Monika Kedrak
44 kg	(Russia) Nadezhda Fedorova	(Azerbaijan) Marziget Bagomedova	(Turkey) Sümeyye Sezer
48 kg	(Germany) Jaqueline Schellin	(Netherlands) Jessica Blaszka	(Slovakia) Lenka Matejova
48 kg	(Germany) Jaqueline Schellin	(Netherlands) Jessica Blaszka	(Belarus) Vanesa Kaladzinskaya
51 kg	(Romania) Alexandra Munteanu	(Ukraine) Maryana Bezruka	(Azerbaijan) Patimat Bagomedova
51 kg	(Romania) Alexandra Munteanu	(Ukraine) Maryana Bezruka	(Germany) Eileen Friedrich
55 kg	(Ukraine) Yuliya Khavaldzhy	(Turkey) Hafize Şahin	(Latvia) Anastasija Grigorjeva
55 kg	(Ukraine) Yuliya Khavaldzhy	(Turkey) Hafize Şahin	(Poland) Katarzyna Krawczyk
59 kg	(Moldova) Mariana Cherdivara	(Switzerland) Fabienne Wittenwiler	(Bulgaria) Taybe Yusein
59 kg	(Moldova) Mariana Cherdivara	(Switzerland) Fabienne Wittenwiler	(Ukraine) Iryna Husyak
63 kg	(Germany) Aline Rotter-Focken	(Russia) Irina Sushko	(Belarus) Anastasiya Huchok
63 kg	(Germany) Aline Rotter-Focken	(Russia) Irina Sushko	(Spain) Irene García-Garrido
67 kg	(Ukraine) Alina Berezhna	(Germany) Maria Selmaier	(Hungary) Siroki Timea
67 kg	(Ukraine) Alina Berezhna	(Germany) Maria Selmaier	(Russia) Inna Trazhukova
72 kg	(Russia) Natalia Vorobieva	(France) Cynthia Vescan	(Ukraine) Natalia Murachova
72 kg	(Russia) Natalia Vorobieva	(France) Cynthia Vescan	(Turkey) Kübra Yücel
