= 2011 World Wrestling Championships – Men's Greco-Roman 55 kg =

Men's wrestling competition

Men's Greco-Roman 55 kg at the 2011 World Championships
- Venue: Sinan Erdem Dome
- Dates: 12 September 2011
- Competitors: 37 from 37 nations

Medalists
gold medal	Rovshan Bayramov	Azerbaijan
silver medal	Elbek Tazhyieu	Belarus
bronze medal	Li Shujin	China
bronze medal	Bekkhan Mankiev	Russia

The men's Greco-Roman 55 kilograms is a competition featured at the 2011 World Wrestling Championships, and was held at the Sinan Erdem Dome in Istanbul, Turkey on 12 September 2011.

== Results ==
Legend

- F — Won by fall

=== Finals ===
Semifinals				Final
Rovshan Bayramov (AZE)	3	2
Li Shujin (CHN)	0	0		Rovshan Bayramov (AZE)	3	1
Elbek Tazhyieu (BLR)	0	2	2	Elbek Tazhyieu (BLR)	0	0
Bekkhan Mankiev (RUS)	1	1	0

=== Top half ===
==== Section 1 ====
Round of 64

Round of 32
Dawid Ersetic (POL)	0	1	0
Anar Zeinalov (EST)	1	1	1
Francisco Encarnación (DOM)	0	0
Péter Módos (HUN)	1	3
Venelin Venkov (BUL)	0	0
Rovshan Bayramov (AZE)	1	3
Kohei Hasegawa (JPN)	2	4
Margarito Angana (PHI)	0	0

Round of 16
Anar Zeinalov (EST)	2	1	0
Péter Módos (HUN)	4	0	1
Rovshan Bayramov (AZE)	1	0	1
Kohei Hasegawa (JPN)	0	2	0

Quarterfinals
Péter Módos (HUN)	0	0
Rovshan Bayramov (AZE)	1	1

==== Section 2 ====
Round of 64

Round of 32
Spenser Mango (USA)	0	0
Arsen Eraliev (KGZ)	1	1
Yagnier Hernández (CUB)	0	0
Jorge Cardozo (VEN)	1	2
Askhat Kudaibergenov (KAZ)	0	1	1
Joginder Singh (IND)	3	0	0
Li Shujin (CHN)	1	0	3
Virgil Munteanu (ROU)	0	2	0

Round of 16
Arsen Eraliev (KGZ)	0	2	1
Jorge Cardozo (VEN)	1	0	0
Askhat Kudaibergenov (KAZ)	0	1	0
Li Shujin (CHN)	1	0	2

Quarterfinals
Arsen Eraliev (KGZ)	0	0
Li Shujin (CHN)	1	1

=== Bottom half ===
==== Section 3 ====
Round of 64

Round of 32
Elgin Loren Elwais (PLW)	0	0
Đồng Văn Biên (VIE)	2	6
Thomas Rønningen (NOR)	1	0
Elbek Tazhyieu (BLR)	1	3
Ivan Lizatović (CRO)	0	3^{F}
Ayhan Karakuş (TUR)	6	1
Jani Haapamäki (FIN)	0	1	0
Yun Won-chol (PRK)	2	0	3

Round of 16
Đồng Văn Biên (VIE)	0	0
Elbek Tazhyieu (BLR)	1	1
Ivan Lizatović (CRO)	2	1	0
Yun Won-chol (PRK)	0	3	4

Quarterfinals
Elbek Tazhyieu (BLR)	1	1
Yun Won-chol (PRK)	0	0

==== Section 4 ====
Round of 64
Mohsen Hajipour (IRI)	3	0	0
Donior Islamov (MDA)	0	1	3
Ildefonso Aranguré (MEX)	4	6
Mohammed Bouterfessa (ALG)	0	0
Choi Gyu-jin (KOR)	3	1
Ildar Hafizov (UZB)	0	0
Vugar Rahimov (UKR)	4	3^{F}
Lasha Gogitadze (GEO)	0	0
Federico Manea (ITA)	0	0
Roman Amoyan (ARM)	2	7

Round of 32
Bekkhan Mankiev (RUS)	2	1
Joaquín Martínez (ESP)	0	0
Vladimir Tsaryuk (ISR)	4	0	0
Donior Islamov (MDA)	1	3	1
Ildefonso Aranguré (MEX)	0	1	0
Choi Gyu-jin (KOR)	2	1	2
Vugar Rahimov (UKR)	2	0
Roman Amoyan (ARM)	3	3

Round of 16
Bekkhan Mankiev (RUS)	3	2
Donior Islamov (MDA)	0	0
Choi Gyu-jin (KOR)	2	0	3
Roman Amoyan (ARM)	2	1	0

Quarterfinals
Bekkhan Mankiev (RUS)	2	0	2
Choi Gyu-jin (KOR)	0	2	0

=== Repechage ===
Repechage round 2
Venelin Venkov (BUL)	0	0
Kohei Hasegawa (JPN)	1	1
Thomas Rønningen (NOR)	2	1
Đồng Văn Biên (VIE)	0	0

Repechage round 3
Kohei Hasegawa (JPN)	0	1	0
Péter Módos (HUN)	1	0	1
Thomas Rønningen (NOR)	0	0
Yun Won-chol (PRK)	3	2

Bronze medals
Péter Módos (HUN)	0	0
Li Shujin (CHN)	7	6
Yun Won-chol (PRK)	0	1	0
Bekkhan Mankiev (RUS)	1	0	1
