= 2010 World Junior Wrestling Championships =

Junior Wrestling Championships

- Host city: Budapest, Hungary
- Dates: 19–25 July 2010

Champions
- Freestyle: Russia
- Greco-Roman: Russia
- Women: Russia

The 2010 World Junior Wrestling Championships were the 33rd edition of the World Junior Wrestling Championships and were held in Budapest, Hungary between 19 and 25 July 2010.

== Medal table ==
Rank	Nation	Gold	Silver	Bronze	Total
1	Russia	10	5	4	19
2	Azerbaijan	3	4	3	10
3	Ukraine	3	1	3	7
4	Georgia	2	1	3	6
5	China	2	0	1	3
6	Japan	1	2	4	7
7	United States	1	0	4	5
8	Armenia	1	0	1	2
9	Canada	1	0	0	1
10	Turkey	0	3	3	6
11	Mongolia	0	1	3	4
12	Uzbekistan	0	1	1	2
13	Croatia	0	1	0	1
13	France	0	1	0	1
13	Kazakhstan	0	1	0	1
13	Norway	0	1	0	1
13	Romania	0	1	0	1
13	South Korea	0	1	0	1
19	Germany	0	0	5	5
19	Iran	0	0	5	5
21	Belarus	0	0	2	2
22	Bulgaria	0	0	1	1
22	Egypt	0	0	1	1
22	Finland	0	0	1	1
22	Hungary	0	0	1	1
22	India	0	0	1	1
22	Moldova	0	0	1	1
Totals (27 entries)		24	24	48	96

== Medal summary ==
=== Men's freestyle ===
Event	Gold	Silver	Bronze
50 kg	Zikrula Dadaev; Russia	Lasha Talakhasdze; Georgia	Nijat Muradov; Azerbaijan
50 kg	Zikrula Dadaev; Russia	Lasha Talakhasdze; Georgia	Anatolii Buruian; Moldova
55 kg	Vladimer Khinchegashvili; Georgia	Toghrul Asgarov; Azerbaijan	Ibrahim Farag; Egypt
55 kg	Vladimer Khinchegashvili; Georgia	Toghrul Asgarov; Azerbaijan	Rasul Mashezov; Russia
60 kg	Gadzhi Abdulaev; Russia	Umud Mammadov; Azerbaijan	Tengiz Chikviladze; Georgia
60 kg	Gadzhi Abdulaev; Russia	Umud Mammadov; Azerbaijan	Yasuhiro Suzuki; Japan
66 kg	Alan Gogaev; Russia	Kotaro Tanaka; Japan	Anton Afanasyev; Belarus
66 kg	Alan Gogaev; Russia	Kotaro Tanaka; Japan	Mohammad Kamangar; Iran
74 kg	David Khutsishvili; Georgia	Soner Demirtaş; Turkey	Ibrahim Yusifov; Azerbaijan
74 kg	David Khutsishvili; Georgia	Soner Demirtaş; Turkey	Arsen Shallaev; Russia
84 kg	Andrey Valiev; Russia	İbrahim Bölükbaşı; Turkey	Michael Perry; United States
84 kg	Andrey Valiev; Russia	İbrahim Bölükbaşı; Turkey	Subkhonjon Toshpulatov; Uzbekistan
96 kg	Shamil Akhmedov; Russia	Aslanbek Alborov; Azerbaijan	Erfan Amiri; Iran
96 kg	Shamil Akhmedov; Russia	Aslanbek Alborov; Azerbaijan	Fatih Yaşarlı; Turkey
120 kg	Muradin Kushkhov; Ukraine	Taha Akgül; Turkey	Csercsics Richárd; Hungary
120 kg	Muradin Kushkhov; Ukraine	Taha Akgül; Turkey	Giorgi Sakandelidze; Georgia

=== Greco-Roman ===
Event	Gold	Silver	Bronze
50 kg	Eldaniz Azizli; Azerbaijan	Aisultan Baizakov; Kazakhstan	Seiki Goya; Japan
50 kg	Eldaniz Azizli; Azerbaijan	Aisultan Baizakov; Kazakhstan	Tolgahan Karataş; Turkey
55 kg	Stepan Maryanyan; Russia	Gasim Mahammadov; Azerbaijan	Oliver Runge; Germany
55 kg	Stepan Maryanyan; Russia	Gasim Mahammadov; Azerbaijan	Saman Abdevali; Iran
60 kg	Kamran Mammadov; Azerbaijan	Asker Orshokdugov; Russia	Aleksander Mikaelyan; Armenia
60 kg	Kamran Mammadov; Azerbaijan	Asker Orshokdugov; Russia	Lenur Temirov; Ukraine
66 kg	Chingiz Labazanov; Russia	Dominik Etlinger; Croatia	Ellis Coleman; United States
66 kg	Chingiz Labazanov; Russia	Dominik Etlinger; Croatia	Rasul Chunayev; Azerbaijan
74 kg	Roman Vlasov; Russia	Besiki Saldadze; Uzbekistan	Veli-Karri Suominen; Finland
74 kg	Roman Vlasov; Russia	Besiki Saldadze; Uzbekistan	Alizadeh Pournia; Iran
84 kg	Artur Aleksanyan; Armenia	Lee Se-Yeol; South Korea	Arsen Kakhabrishvili; Georgia
84 kg	Artur Aleksanyan; Armenia	Lee Se-Yeol; South Korea	Zhan Beleniuk; Ukraine
96 kg	Islam Magomedov; Russia	Alin Alexuc-Ciurariu; Romania	Shahab Ghourehjili; Iran
96 kg	Islam Magomedov; Russia	Alin Alexuc-Ciurariu; Romania	Efe Coşkun; Germany
120 kg	Igor Didyk; Ukraine	David Oganesyan; Russia	Eduard Popp; Germany
120 kg	Igor Didyk; Ukraine	David Oganesyan; Russia	Bayram Nigar; Turkey

=== Women's freestyle ===
Event	Gold	Silver	Bronze
44 kg	Marziget Bagomedova; Azerbaijan	Nadezhda Fedorova; Russia	Narangerel Erdenesukh; Mongolia
44 kg	Marziget Bagomedova; Azerbaijan	Nadezhda Fedorova; Russia	Anzhela Kleshcheva; Ukraine
48 kg	Victoria Anthony; United States	Bayarmagnai Davaasuren; Mongolia	Tatyana Samkova; Russia
48 kg	Victoria Anthony; United States	Bayarmagnai Davaasuren; Mongolia	Jaqueline Schellin; Germany
51 kg	Sun Yanan; China	Hirano Haruka; Japan	Amy Whitbeck; United States
51 kg	Sun Yanan; China	Hirano Haruka; Japan	Davaasükhiin Otgontsetseg; Mongolia
55 kg	Yu Horiuchi; Japan	Yuliya Khavaldzhy; Ukraine	Helen Maroulis; United States
55 kg	Yu Horiuchi; Japan	Yuliya Khavaldzhy; Ukraine	Irina Ologonova; Ukraine
59 kg	Lan Zhang; China	Valeria Koblova; Russia	Kanako Murata; Japan
59 kg	Lan Zhang; China	Valeria Koblova; Russia	Sakshi Malik; India
63 kg	Danielle Lappage; Canada	Valeria Lazinskaya; Russia	Taybe Yusein; Bulgaria
63 kg	Danielle Lappage; Canada	Valeria Lazinskaya; Russia	Aline Rotter-Focken; Germany
67 kg	Alina Berezhna; Ukraine	Jenny Aardalen; Norway	SChiaki Iijima; Japan
67 kg	Alina Berezhna; Ukraine	Jenny Aardalen; Norway	Purevkuu Sodnom; Mongolia
72 kg	Natalia Vorobieva; Russia	Cynthia Vescan; France	Xinyi Liu; China
72 kg	Natalia Vorobieva; Russia	Cynthia Vescan; France	Yulia Dravazyuk; Belarus
