= 2014 European Wrestling Championships – Men's Greco-Roman 59 kg =

Wrestling competitions

The Men's Greco-Roman 59 kg is a competition featured at the 2014 European Wrestling Championships, and was held in Vantaa, Finland on 5 April 2014.

== Medalists ==
Gold	Aleksandar Kostadinov; Bulgaria
Silver	Victor Ciobanu; Moldova
Bronze	Kamran Mammadov; Azerbaijan
Bronze	Ivan Kuylakov; Russia

== Results ==
Legend

- C — Won by 3 cautions given to the opponent
- F — Won by fall

=== Final ===
Final
Victor Ciobanu (MDA)	0
Aleksandar Kostadinov (BUL)	11

=== Top half ===
Round of 32

Round of 16
Michal Novák (CZE)	0
Kamran Mammadov (AZE)	5
Deniz Menekse (GER)	7
Victor Ciobanu (MDA)	10
Attila Levai (SVK)	1
Soslan Daurov (BLR)	9
Edward Barsegjan (POL)	0
Rahman Bilici (TUR)	6

Quarterfinals
Kamran Mammadov (AZE)	2
Victor Ciobanu (MDA)	3
Soslan Daurov (BLR)	9
Rahman Bilici (TUR)	11

Semifinals
Victor Ciobanu (MDA)	3
Rahman Bilici (TUR)	0

=== Bottom half ===
Round of 32
Ivan Kuylakov (RUS)	4
Stig-André Berge (NOR)	2
Karen Aslanyan (ARM)	8
João Carvalho (POR)	0
Jani Haapamäki (FIN)	6
Aleksandar Kostadinov (BUL)	10
Alex Anechite (ROU)	0
Tonimir Sokol (CRO)	8
Tobias Fonnesbek (DEN)	4
Joaquín Martínez (ESP)	0
Kristijan Fris (SRB)	8
Lasha Gogitadze (GEO)	3
Andriy Tsaryuk (ISR)	2
Csongor Knipli (HUN)	0

Round of 16
Evgeni Miagki (UKR)	0
Ivan Kuylakov (RUS)	5
Karen Aslanyan (ARM)	3
Aleksandar Kostadinov (BUL)	3
Tonimir Sokol (CRO)	1
Tobias Fonnesbek (DEN)	0
Kristijan Fris (SRB)	8
Andriy Tsaryuk (ISR)	0

Quarterfinals
Ivan Kuylakov (RUS)	3
Aleksandar Kostadinov (BUL)	4
Tonimir Sokol (CRO)	0
Kristijan Fris (SRB)	7

Semifinals
Aleksandar Kostadinov (BUL)	2
Kristijan Fris (SRB)	1

=== Repechage ===
Repechage round 1
Jani Haapamäki (FIN)	4^{C}
Karen Aslanyan (ARM)	4

Repechage round 2
Deniz Menekse (GER)	2
Kamran Mammadov (AZE)	5
Jani Haapamäki (FIN)	1
Ivan Kuylakov (RUS)	3

Bronze medals
Kamran Mammadov (AZE)	9
Rahman Bilici (TUR)	8
Ivan Kuylakov (RUS)	6^{F}
Kristijan Fris (SRB)	0
