= 2008 World Wrestling Championships – Women's freestyle 51 kg =

Women's freestyle 51 kg at the 2008 World Championships
- Venue: Yoyogi National Gymnasium
- Dates: 11 October 2008
- Competitors: 20 from 20 nations

Medalists
gold medal	Hitomi Sakamoto	Japan
silver medal	Maryna Markevich	Belarus
bronze medal	Vanessa Boubryemm	France
bronze medal	Yuliya Blahinya	Ukraine

The women's freestyle 51 kilograms is a competition featured at the 2008 World Wrestling Championships, and was held at the Yoyogi National Gymnasium in Tokyo, Japan on 11 October.

This freestyle wrestling competition consists of a single-elimination tournament, with a repechage used to determine the winner of two bronze medals.

== Results ==
Legend

- F — Won by fall

=== Final ===
Final
Hitomi Sakamoto (JPN)	5^{F}
Maryna Markevich (BLR)	0

=== Top half ===
Round of 32

Round of 16
Neha Rathi (IND)	0	3	2
Isabelle Sambou (SEN)	1	2	1
Vanessa Boubryemm (FRA)	7	0	4
Huang Wenjuan (CHN)	0	4	3
Helen Maroulis (USA)	4^{F}
Roksana Zasina (POL)	1
Jessica Bondy (CAN)	0
Hitomi Sakamoto (JPN)	5^{F}

Quarterfinals
Neha Rathi (IND)	2	0
Vanessa Boubryemm (FRA)	3	3
Helen Maroulis (USA)	0	0
Hitomi Sakamoto (JPN)	7	6

Semifinals
Vanessa Boubryemm (FRA)	0
Hitomi Sakamoto (JPN)	7^{F}

=== Bottom half ===
Round of 32
Tseng Pei-tzu (TPE)	0
Natalia Budu (MDA)	7^{F}
Marina Vilmova (RUS)	2	4
Kyla Bremner (AUS)	0	1
Aguis Rivas (VEN)	3	4
Tatyana Bakatyuk (KAZ)	1	0
Dilek Atakol (TUR)	1	2
Dinara Mirzaeva (UZB)	0	0

Round of 16
Yuliya Blahinya (UKR)	6	3^{F}
Park Hye-jung (KOR)	0	0
Maryna Markevich (BLR)	1	6
Davaasükhiin Otgontsetseg (MGL)	0	0
Natalia Budu (MDA)	2	1
Marina Vilmova (RUS)	3	4
Aguis Rivas (VEN)	6	0	3
Dilek Atakol (TUR)	2	2	0

Quarterfinals
Yuliya Blahinya (UKR)	0
Maryna Markevich (BLR)	4^{F}
Marina Vilmova (RUS)	1	6
Aguis Rivas (VEN)	0	0

Semifinals
Maryna Markevich (BLR)	0	5	6
Marina Vilmova (RUS)	3	0	0

=== Repechage ===
Repechage round 2
Jessica Bondy (CAN)	3	1	1
Helen Maroulis (USA)	1	1	0
Davaasükhiin Otgontsetseg (MGL)	1	0
Yuliya Blahinya (UKR)	2	4^{F}

Bronze medals
Jessica Bondy (CAN)	1	7	3
Vanessa Boubryemm (FRA)	4	0	3
Yuliya Blahinya (UKR)	3	6
Marina Vilmova (RUS)	0	3
