= 2010 World Wrestling Championships – Women's freestyle 48 kg =

Women's freestyle 48 kg at the 2010 World Championships
- Venue: Olympic Stadium
- Dates: 8 September 2010
- Competitors: 25 from 25 nations

Medalists
gold medal	Hitomi Sakamoto	Japan
silver medal	Lorisa Oorzhak	Russia
bronze medal	Zhao Shasha	China
bronze medal	Carol Huynh	Canada

The women's freestyle 48 kilograms is a competition featured at the 2010 World Wrestling Championships, and was held at the Olympic Stadium in Moscow, Russia on 8 September.

This freestyle wrestling competition consists of a single-elimination tournament, with a repechage used to determine the winner of two bronze medals.

== Results ==
Legend

- F — Won by fall

=== Final ===
Final
Lorisa Oorzhak (RUS)	2	0	0
Hitomi Sakamoto (JPN)	1	1	6

=== Top half ===
Round of 32
Patimat Bagomedova (AZE)	6	3
Mikhrniso Nurmatova (KGZ)	0	0

Round of 16
Lorisa Oorzhak (RUS)	1	5	4
Zhao Shasha (CHN)	2	2	3
Vanesa Kaladzinskaya (BLR)	5	4
Sümeyye Sezer (TUR)	2	2
Jessica Blaszka (NED)	0	3
Maroi Mezien (TUN)	4	7
Mayelis Caripá (VEN)	0	2
Patimat Bagomedova (AZE)	7	4

Quarterfinals
Lorisa Oorzhak (RUS)	2	4
Vanesa Kaladzinskaya (BLR)	0	0
Maroi Mezien (TUN)	1	0
Patimat Bagomedova (AZE)	3	1

Semifinals
Lorisa Oorzhak (RUS)	1	1
Patimat Bagomedova (AZE)	0	0

=== Bottom half ===
Round of 32
Patricia Bermúdez (ARG)	2	3
Yana Stadnik (GBR)	4	6
Kim Hyung-joo (KOR)	3	8^{F}
Jaqueline Schellin (GER)	0	0
Cristina Croitoru (ROU)	6	7
Eleonora Abutalipova (KAZ)	2	2
Iwona Matkowska (POL)	4^{F}
Alyssa Lampe (USA)	5
Khrystyna Daranutsa (UKR)	2	0	1
Nirmala Devi (IND)	1	1	0
Hitomi Sakamoto (JPN)	9^{F}
Íngrid Medrano (ESA)	0
Sara Sánchez (ESP)	0
Carol Huynh (CAN)	5^{F}
Fani Psatha (GRE)	0	0
Tsogtbazaryn Enkhjargal (MGL)	1	3^{F}

Round of 16
Yana Stadnik (GBR)	0	6^{F}
Kim Hyung-joo (KOR)	1	1
Cristina Croitoru (ROU)	0	0
Iwona Matkowska (POL)	3	2
Khrystyna Daranutsa (UKR)	4
Hitomi Sakamoto (JPN)	6^{F}
Carol Huynh (CAN)	1	0	2
Tsogtbazaryn Enkhjargal (MGL)	0	1	0

Quarterfinals
Yana Stadnik (GBR)	0	3	0
Iwona Matkowska (POL)	2	3	4
Hitomi Sakamoto (JPN)	2	3
Carol Huynh (CAN)	0	0

Semifinals
Iwona Matkowska (POL)	0	0
Hitomi Sakamoto (JPN)	4	1

=== Repechage ===
Repechage round 1
Íngrid Medrano (ESA)	0	1
Khrystyna Daranutsa (UKR)	6	6^{F}

Repechage round 2
Zhao Shasha (CHN)	5^{F}
Vanesa Kaladzinskaya (BLR)	0
Khrystyna Daranutsa (UKR)	0	0
Carol Huynh (CAN)	6	1

Bronze medals
Zhao Shasha (CHN)	7	4
Patimat Bagomedova (AZE)	5	0
Carol Huynh (CAN)	0	3	2
Iwona Matkowska (POL)	2	0	0
