= 2009 World Wrestling Championships – Men's Greco-Roman 60 kg =

Men's Greco-Roman 60 kg at the 2009 World Championships
- Venue: Messecenter Herning
- Dates: 26 September 2009
- Competitors: 36 from 36 nations

Medalists
gold medal	Islambek Albiev	Russia
silver medal	Dilshod Aripov	Uzbekistan
bronze medal	Nurbakyt Tengizbayev	Kazakhstan
bronze medal	Vitaliy Rahimov	Azerbaijan

The men's Greco-Roman 60 kilograms is a competition featured at the 2009 World Wrestling Championships, and was held at the Messecenter Herning exhibition center in Herning, Denmark on September 26.

== Results ==
Legend

- F — Won by fall

=== Finals ===
Semifinals				Final
Islambek Albiev (RUS)	1	0	1
Nurbakyt Tengizbayev (KAZ)	1	3	0	Islambek Albiev (RUS)	1	3
Dilshod Aripov (UZB)	0	1	2	Dilshod Aripov (UZB)	0	0
Vitaliy Rahimov (AZE)	1	0	0

=== Top half ===
==== Section 1 ====
Round of 64

Round of 32
Wuileixis Rivas (VEN)	0	0
Islambek Albiev (RUS)	1	5
Davor Štefanek (SRB)	4	3^{F}
Jesper Karlsson (SWE)	0	0
Anders Ekström (DEN)	0	0
Stig-André Berge (NOR)	7	3
Ruslan Israfilov (UKR)	2	1
Jarkko Ala-Huikku (FIN)	0	0

Round of 16
Islambek Albiev (RUS)	5	1
Davor Štefanek (SRB)	0	0
Stig-André Berge (NOR)	2	3	2
Ruslan Israfilov (UKR)	2	0	0

Quarterfinals
Islambek Albiev (RUS)	1	1
Stig-André Berge (NOR)	0	0

==== Section 2 ====
Round of 64

Round of 32
Svajūnas Adomaitis (LTU)	0	1
Eusebiu Diaconu (ROU)	1	1
Nurbakyt Tengizbayev (KAZ)	1	7^{F}
Jung Kyung-ho (KOR)	0	0
Tạ Ngọc Tân (VIE)	2	0
Ryutaro Matsumoto (JPN)	0	6^{F}
Artak Harutyunyan (ARM)	2	1
Tonimir Sokol (CRO)	0	0

Round of 16
Eusebiu Diaconu (ROU)	1	0
Nurbakyt Tengizbayev (KAZ)	1	2^{F}
Ryutaro Matsumoto (JPN)	0	1	6
Artak Harutyunyan (ARM)	1	0	0

Quarterfinals
Nurbakyt Tengizbayev (KAZ)	4	1
Ryutaro Matsumoto (JPN)	0	0

=== Bottom half ===
==== Section 3 ====
Round of 64

Round of 32
Dzmitry Alenski (BLR)	2	0	2
Ravinder Singh (IND)	0	1	0
Edward Barsegjan (POL)	1	0	0
Dilshod Aripov (UZB)	0	2	2
Mourad El-Bakali (MAR)	0	1
Sayed Abdelmoneim (EGY)	1	1
Ondřej Ulip (CZE)	0	0
Soner Sucu (TUR)	1	1

Round of 16
Dzmitry Alenski (BLR)	0	0
Dilshod Aripov (UZB)	1	3
Sayed Abdelmoneim (EGY)	0	0
Soner Sucu (TUR)	1	6

Quarterfinals
Dilshod Aripov (UZB)	0	7^{F}
Soner Sucu (TUR)	1	0

==== Section 4 ====
Round of 64
Hanser Meoque (CUB)	0	0
Revaz Lashkhi (GEO)	1	2
Jeremiah Davis (USA)	0	0
Sébastien Hidalgo (FRA)	2	3
Ivo Angelov (BUL)	2	1
Jansel Ramírez (DOM)	0	0
Omid Norouzi (IRI)	2	3
Zhou Zhen (CHN)	0	0

Round of 32
Paolo Fucile (ITA)	0	0
Vitaliy Rahimov (AZE)	1	6
Ruslan Tyumenbayev (KGZ)	2	1
Ede Komáromi (HUN)	0	0
Revaz Lashkhi (GEO)	2	1
Sébastien Hidalgo (FRA)	0	0
Ivo Angelov (BUL)	0	0
Omid Norouzi (IRI)	3	1

Round of 16
Vitaliy Rahimov (AZE)	1	1
Ruslan Tyumenbayev (KGZ)	0	0
Revaz Lashkhi (GEO)	3	2
Omid Norouzi (IRI)	0	0

Quarterfinals
Vitaliy Rahimov (AZE)	1	1
Revaz Lashkhi (GEO)	0	0

=== Repechage ===
Repechage round 2
Wuileixis Rivas (VEN)	0	0
Davor Štefanek (SRB)	1	4^{F}
Edward Barsegjan (POL)	3	1
Dzmitry Alenski (BLR)	0	0

Repechage round 3
Davor Štefanek (SRB)	4^{F}
Stig-André Berge (NOR)	0
Edward Barsegjan (POL)	5	0	0
Soner Sucu (TUR)	0	3	3

Bronze medals
Davor Štefanek (SRB)	0	0
Nurbakyt Tengizbayev (KAZ)	1	2
Soner Sucu (TUR)	2	0	0
Vitaliy Rahimov (AZE)	0	2	1
