= 2013 World Wrestling Championships – Men's Greco-Roman 60 kg =

Men's Greco-Roman 60 kg at the 2013 World Championships
- Venue: László Papp Budapest Sports Arena
- Dates: 21 September 2013
- Competitors: 39 from 39 nations

Medalists
gold medal	Ivo Angelov	Bulgaria
silver medal	Ivan Kuylakov	Russia
bronze medal	Woo Seung-jae	South Korea
bronze medal	Elmurat Tasmuradov	Uzbekistan

The men's Greco-Roman 60 kilograms is a competition featured at the 2013 World Wrestling Championships, and was held at the László Papp Budapest Sports Arena in Budapest, Hungary on 21 September 2013.

== Results ==
Legend

- C — Won by 3 cautions given to the opponent
- F — Won by fall
- R — Retired

=== Finals ===
Semifinals		Final
Ivo Angelov (BUL)	1
Woo Seung-jae (KOR)	0	Ivo Angelov (BUL)	3
Almat Kebispayev (KAZ)	0	Ivan Kuylakov (RUS)	2
Ivan Kuylakov (RUS)	6

=== Top half ===
==== Section 1 ====
Round of 64

Round of 32
Kristijan Fris (SRB)	5^{F}
Moisés Soto (PAN)	0
Ivo Angelov (BUL)	7
Juan Carlos López (COL)	0
Ruben Moniz (POR)	1
Raiber Rodríguez (VEN)	6
Edward Barsegjan (POL)	8
Diego Romanelli (BRA)	0

Round of 16
Kristijan Fris (SRB)	0
Ivo Angelov (BUL)	7
Raiber Rodríguez (VEN)	5
Edward Barsegjan (POL)	9

Quarterfinals
Ivo Angelov (BUL)	8
Edward Barsegjan (POL)	4

==== Section 2 ====
Round of 64

Round of 32
Jesse Thielke (USA)	9
Christos Theodorakis (GRE)	4
Ravinder Singh (IND)	3^{F}
Erbol Kalabayeu (BLR)	6
Zhou Jingjie (CHN)	3
Tobias Fonnesbek (DEN)	6
Woo Seung-jae (KOR)	4
Kamran Mammadov (AZE)	0

Round of 16
Jesse Thielke (USA)	6^{F}
Ravinder Singh (IND)	0
Tobias Fonnesbek (DEN)	0
Woo Seung-jae (KOR)	9

Quarterfinals
Jesse Thielke (USA)	4
Woo Seung-jae (KOR)	7

=== Bottom half ===
==== Section 3 ====
Round of 64

Round of 32
Tarik Belmadani (FRA)	8
István Lévai (SVK)	1
Frunze Harutyunyan (SWE)	5
Francisco Encarnación (DOM)	2
Víctor Méndez (MEX)	0
Virgil Munteanu (ROU)	2
Alberto Mendieta (NCA)	0
Almat Kebispayev (KAZ)	7

Round of 16
Tarik Belmadani (FRA)	4
Frunze Harutyunyan (SWE)	0
Virgil Munteanu (ROU)	2
Almat Kebispayev (KAZ)	8^{F}

Quarterfinals
Tarik Belmadani (FRA)	0
Almat Kebispayev (KAZ)	7^{F}

==== Section 4 ====
Round of 64
Aleksan Mikayelyan (ARM)	0
Ivan Kuylakov (RUS)	7
Tonimir Sokol (CRO)	3
Elmurat Tasmuradov (UZB)	6
Mouatez Djedaiet (ALG)	0^{R}
Mevlüt Arık (TUR)	2
Arsen Eraliev (KGZ)	2
István Kozak (HUN)	2
Stig-André Berge (NOR)	2
Ismael Borrero (CUB)	5
Kazuma Kuramoto (JPN)	5^{C}
Revaz Lashkhi (GEO)	0
Donior Islamov (MDA)	2
Mohammad Nourbakhsh (IRI)	8^{F}

Round of 32
Dmytro Tsymbalyuk (UKR)	5
Ivan Kuylakov (RUS)	6
Elmurat Tasmuradov (UZB)	6
Mevlüt Arık (TUR)	5
István Kozak (HUN)	0
Ismael Borrero (CUB)	6
Kazuma Kuramoto (JPN)	10
Mohammad Nourbakhsh (IRI)	2

Round of 16
Ivan Kuylakov (RUS)	7
Elmurat Tasmuradov (UZB)	0
Ismael Borrero (CUB)	3
Kazuma Kuramoto (JPN)	12

Quarterfinals
Ivan Kuylakov (RUS)	9
Kazuma Kuramoto (JPN)	0

=== Repechage ===
Repechage round 1
Aleksan Mikayelyan (ARM)	3
Dmytro Tsymbalyuk (UKR)	3^{C}

Repechage round 2
Juan Carlos López (COL)	0
Kristijan Fris (SRB)	7
Dmytro Tsymbalyuk (UKR)	0
Elmurat Tasmuradov (UZB)	7

Repechage round 3
Kristijan Fris (SRB)	0
Edward Barsegjan (POL)	4^{F}
Elmurat Tasmuradov (UZB)	8
Kazuma Kuramoto (JPN)	0

Bronze medals
Edward Barsegjan (POL)	0
Woo Seung-jae (KOR)	7
Elmurat Tasmuradov (UZB)	11
Almat Kebispayev (KAZ)	6
