= 2013 European Wrestling Championships – Men's Greco-Roman 60 kg =

The men's Greco-Roman 60 kg is a competition featured at the 2013 European Wrestling Championships, and was held at the Tbilisi Sports Palace in Tbilisi, Georgia on 23 March, 2013.

== Medalists ==
Gold	Ivo Angelov; Bulgaria
Silver	Ivan Kuylakov; Russia
Bronze	Kamran Mammadov; Azerbaijan
Bronze	István Lévai; Slovakia

== Results ==
Legend

- C — Won by 3 cautions given to the opponent
- F — Won by fall

=== Final ===
Final
Ivo Angelov (BUL)	2	1
Ivan Kuylakov (RUS)	0	0

=== Top Half ===
Round of 32

Round of 16
Maksim Kazharski (BLR)	2	2^{F}
Artour Hatsatourov (GRE)	1	0
Tobias Fonnesbek (DEN)	0	0
Virgil Munteanu (ROU)	1	2
Ivo Angelov (BUL)	3	7
Lorenzo Gentile (ITA)	0	0
Kamran Mammadov (AZE)	1	2^{C}
Donior Islamov (MDA)	0	0

Quarterfinals
Maksim Kazharski (BLR)	1	4
Virgil Munteanu (ROU)	0	4
Ivo Angelov (BUL)	1	2
Kamran Mammadov (AZE)	0	1

Semifinals
Maksim Kazharski (BLR)	0	1	0
Ivo Angelov (BUL)	1	0	1

=== Bottom Half ===
Round of 32
Marcus Selldén (SWE)	3	6
Esa Uimonen (FIN)	1	0
Albert Baghumyan (ESP)	1	0
Dawid Ersetic (POL)	4	1
Lenur Temirov (UKR)	0	3	2
Rahman Bilici (TUR)	5	3	1
Michal Novák (CZE)	0	2
Erik Weiß (GER)	1	5
István Kozak (HUN)	1	0
Aleksan Mikayelyan (ARM)	2	2
István Lévai (SVK)	0	0
Ivan Kuylakov (RUS)	2	1
Kristijan Fris (SRB)	1	1
Revaz Lashkhi (GEO)	5	4
Stig André Berge (NOR)	3	0	0
Tonimir Sokol (CRO)	0	1	1

Round of 16
Marcus Selldén (SWE)	4	4
Dawid Ersetic (POL)	3	2
Lenur Temirov (UKR)	1	0	1
Erik Weiß (GER)	1	1	0
Aleksan Mikayelyan (ARM)	1	1
Ivan Kuylakov (RUS)	2	4
Revaz Lashkhi (GEO)	1	2
Tonimir Sokol (CRO)	0	0

Quarterfinals
Marcus Selldén (SWE)	2	1	0
Lenur Temirov (UKR)	3	1	5
Ivan Kuylakov (RUS)	1	1	3
Revaz Lashkhi (GEO)	3	0	0

Semifinals
Lenur Temirov (UKR)	3	1	0
Ivan Kuylakov (RUS)	7	0	2

=== Repechage ===
Repechage round 1
István Lévai (SVK)	8^{F}
Aleksan Mikayelyan (ARM)	0

Repechage round 2
Lorenzo Gentile (ITA)	0	0
Kamran Mammadov (AZE)	6	1
István Lévai (SVK)	5	3
Revaz Lashkhi (GEO)	0	0

Bronze medals
Kamran Mammadov (AZE)	1	2
Maksim Kazharski (BLR)	0	0
István Lévai (SVK)	5	1
Lenur Temirov (UKR)	1	0
