= 2011 World Wrestling Championships – Women's freestyle 51 kg =

Women's freestyle 51 kg at the 2011 World Championships
- Venue: Sinan Erdem Dome
- Dates: 14 September 2011
- Competitors: 23 from 23 nations

Medalists
gold medal	Zamira Rakhmanova	Russia
silver medal	Davaasükhiin Otgontsetseg	Mongolia
bronze medal	Patimat Bagomedova	Azerbaijan
bronze medal	Jessica MacDonald	Canada

The women's freestyle 51 kilograms is a competition featured at the 2011 World Wrestling Championships, and was held at the Sinan Erdem Dome in Istanbul, Turkey on 14 September 2011.

This freestyle wrestling competition consists of a single-elimination tournament, with a repechage used to determine the winner of two bronze medals.

== Results ==
Legend

- F — Won by fall
- WO — Won by walkover

=== Final ===
Final
Davaasükhiin Otgontsetseg (MGL)	3	0	0
Zamira Rakhmanova (RUS)	2	5	2

=== Top half ===
Round of 32

Round of 16
Davaasükhiin Otgontsetseg (MGL)	2	0	3
Patimat Bagomedova (AZE)	0	1	0
Luisa Valverde (ECU)	1	0
Alexandra Engelhardt (GER)	4	7
Anna Łukasiak (POL)	3	1
Zulfiya Yakhyarova (KAZ)	0	0
Neha Rathi (IND)	2	2
Sümeyye Sezer (TUR)	1	0

Quarterfinals
Davaasükhiin Otgontsetseg (MGL)	0	4	4
Alexandra Engelhardt (GER)	1	0	1
Anna Łukasiak (POL)	2	4	1
Neha Rathi (IND)	3	2	2

Semifinals
Davaasükhiin Otgontsetseg (MGL)	7	1
Neha Rathi (IND)	0	0

=== Bottom half ===
Round of 32
Jessica MacDonald (CAN)	7^{F}
María del Mar Serrano (ESP)	0
Odunayo Adekuoroye (NGR)	3	0
Mariya Ivanova (BLR)	4	1
Sun Yanan (CHN)	4	4
Francesca Mori (ITA)	2	0
Mareka Shidochi (JPN)	2	1
Aurélie Basset (FRA)	0	0
Jazmín Martínez (MEX)	0	0
Olga Narepekha (UKR)	1	3
Estera Dobre (ROU)	0	0
Whitney Conder (USA)	3	1
Natalia Budu (MDA)	3	0
Han Kum-ok (PRK)	3	4

Round of 16
Zamira Rakhmanova (RUS)	4	6
Jessica MacDonald (CAN)	0	4
Mariya Ivanova (BLR)	0	6	0
Sun Yanan (CHN)	1	1	1
Mareka Shidochi (JPN)	2	1
Olga Narepekha (UKR)	1	0
Whitney Conder (USA)	0	0
Han Kum-ok (PRK)	6	1

Quarterfinals
Zamira Rakhmanova (RUS)	3	7
Sun Yanan (CHN)	2	3
Mareka Shidochi (JPN)	1	0	1
Han Kum-ok (PRK)	0	4	1

Semifinals
Zamira Rakhmanova (RUS)	3	5
Mareka Shidochi (JPN)	0	0

=== Repechage ===
Repechage round 2
Patimat Bagomedova (AZE)	5^{F}
Alexandra Engelhardt (GER)	0
Jessica MacDonald (CAN)	W	O
Sun Yanan (CHN)

Bronze medals
Patimat Bagomedova (AZE)	1	1
Neha Rathi (IND)	0	0
Jessica MacDonald (CAN)	6	1
Mareka Shidochi (JPN)	1	0
