= Wrestling at the 2014 Asian Games – Men's Greco-Roman 59 kg =

Men's Greco-Roman 59 kg at the 2014 Asian Games
- Venue: Dowon Gymnasium
- Date: 30 September 2014
- Competitors: 15 from 15 nations

Medalists
gold medal	Kohei Hasegawa	Japan
silver medal	Yun Won-chol	North Korea
bronze medal	Tian Qiye	China
bronze medal	Almat Kebispayev	Kazakhstan

The men's Greco-Roman 59 kilograms wrestling competition at the 2014 Asian Games in Incheon was held on 30 September 2014 at the Dowon Gymnasium.

== Schedule ==
All times are Korea Standard Time (UTC+09:00)

Date	Time	Event
Tuesday, 30 September 2014	13:00	1/8 finals
Tuesday, 30 September 2014	13:00	Quarterfinals
Tuesday, 30 September 2014	13:00	Semifinals
Tuesday, 30 September 2014	13:00	Repechages
Tuesday, 30 September 2014	19:00	Finals

== Results ==
Legend

- C — Won by 3 cautions given to the opponent
- F — Won by fall

=== Main bracket ===
1/8 finals
Kohei Hasegawa (JPN)	11
Tian Qiye (CHN)	0
Basheer Al-Yamani (YEM)	0
Kanybek Zholchubekov (KGZ)	10
Kim Young-jun (KOR)	12
Puntsagiin Erdenebileg (MGL)	4
Almat Kebispayev (KAZ)	1
Ravinder Singh (IND)	0
Mohammed Abbas (IRQ)	9
Ibrahim Arrar (JOR)	0
Ahmadjon Mahmudov (UZB)	8^{F}
Margarito Angana (PHI)	6
Yun Won-chol (PRK)	8^{F}
Wana Tun (MYA)	0

Quarterfinals
Azizbeki Sharifzoda (TJK)	4
Kohei Hasegawa (JPN)	4^{F}
Kanybek Zholchubekov (KGZ)	0
Kim Young-jun (KOR)	1
Almat Kebispayev (KAZ)	8
Mohammed Abbas (IRQ)	0
Ahmadjon Mahmudov (UZB)	0
Yun Won-chol (PRK)	7

Semifinals
Kohei Hasegawa (JPN)	8^{F}
Kim Young-jun (KOR)	4
Almat Kebispayev (KAZ)	0
Yun Won-chol (PRK)	8

Gold medal
Kohei Hasegawa (JPN)	8
Yun Won-chol (PRK)	4

=== Repechage ===
Repechage
Tian Qiye (CHN)	3^{C}
Azizbeki Sharifzoda (TJK)	0
Wana Tun (MYA)	0
Ahmadjon Mahmudov (UZB)	8

Bronze medals
Tian Qiye (CHN)	4
Kim Young-jun (KOR)	0
Ahmadjon Mahmudov (UZB)	9
Almat Kebispayev (KAZ)	8^{F}

== Final standing ==
Rank	Athlete
1st place, gold medalist(s)	Kohei Hasegawa (JPN)
2nd place, silver medalist(s)	Yun Won-chol (PRK)
3rd place, bronze medalist(s)	Tian Qiye (CHN)
3rd place, bronze medalist(s)	Almat Kebispayev (KAZ)
5	Kim Young-jun (KOR)
5	Ahmadjon Mahmudov (UZB)
7	Kanybek Zholchubekov (KGZ)
8	Mohammed Abbas (IRQ)
9	Puntsagiin Erdenebileg (MGL)
10	Margarito Angana (PHI)
11	Azizbeki Sharifzoda (TJK)
12	Ravinder Singh (IND)
13	Ibrahim Arrar (JOR)
14	Basheer Al-Yamani (YEM)
15	Wana Tun (MYA)
