= 2012 World Wrestling Championships – Women's freestyle 51 kg =

Women's freestyle 51 kg at the 2012 World Championships
- Venue: Millennium Place
- Dates: 27 September 2012
- Competitors: 14 from 14 nations

Medalists
gold medal	Jessica MacDonald	Canada
silver medal	Sun Yanan	China
bronze medal	Babita Kumari	India
bronze medal	Alyssa Lampe	United States

The women's freestyle 51 kg is a competition featured at the 2012 World Wrestling Championships, and was held at the Millennium Place in Strathcona County, Alberta, Canada on 27 September 2012.

This freestyle wrestling competition consisted of a single-elimination tournament, with a repechage used to determine the winners of two bronze medals. The two finalists faced off for gold and silver medals. Each wrestler who lost to one of the two finalists moved into the repechage, culminating in a pair of bronze medal matches featuring the semifinal losers each facing the remaining repechage opponent from their half of the bracket.

Each bout consisted of up to three rounds, lasting two minutes apiece. The wrestler who scored more points in each round was the winner of that rounds; the bout finished when one wrestler had won two rounds (and thus the match).

Jessica MacDonald from the host nation won the gold medal.

== Results ==
Legend

- F — Won by fall

=== Main bracket ===
Round of 16
Chiu Hsin-ju (TPE)	0	0
Babita Kumari (IND)	6	5^{F}
Risako Kawai (JPN)	2	3
Yuliya Blahinya (UKR)	0	0
Davaasükhiin Otgontsetseg (MGL)	0	3	0
Roksana Zasina (POL)	1	0	1
Anzhela Dorogan (AZE)	0
Alyssa Lampe (USA)	5^{F}
Burcu Kebiç (TUR)	2
Sun Yanan (CHN)	3^{F}
Elenora Abdutalipova (KAZ)	1	3
Alina Ryzhova (BLR)	0	3

Quarterfinals
Zamira Rakhmanova (RUS)	1	0
Jessica MacDonald (CAN)	2	7
Babita Kumari (IND)	0	1	4^{F}
Risako Kawai (JPN)	7	0	0
Roksana Zasina (POL)	0	0
Alyssa Lampe (USA)	1	2
Sun Yanan (CHN)	7	7
Elenora Abdutalipova (KAZ)	0	0

Semifinals
Jessica MacDonald (CAN)	6	4
Babita Kumari (IND)	0	2
Alyssa Lampe (USA)	1	4	2
Sun Yanan (CHN)	2	4	2

Final
Jessica MacDonald (CAN)	1	4	4
Sun Yanan (CHN)	1	1	0

=== Repechage ===
Repechage round 1
Burcu Kebiç (TUR)	4	0
Elenora Abdutalipova (KAZ)	0	4^{F}

Bronze medals
Zamira Rakhmanova (RUS)	6	3	0
Babita Kumari (IND)	0	6	6^{F}
Elenora Abdutalipova (KAZ)	1	0
Alyssa Lampe (USA)	2	1
