= 2012 European Wrestling Championships =

2012 European Championships
- Host city: Belgrade, Serbia
- Dates: 8–11 March

Champions
- Freestyle: Russia
- Greco-Roman: Russia
- Women: Ukraine

The 2012 European Wrestling Championships were held in Belgrade, Serbia, from 8 March to 11 March 2012.

== Medal table ==
Rank	Nation	Gold	Silver	Bronze	Total
1	Russia	5	2	8	15
2	Ukraine	4	4	3	11
3	Azerbaijan	2	0	4	6
3	Turkey	2	0	4	6
5	Bulgaria	1	4	3	8
6	Georgia	1	3	2	6
7	Poland	1	1	1	3
8	Sweden	1	1	0	2
9	Armenia	1	0	3	4
10	Germany	1	0	2	3
11	Norway	1	0	0	1
11	Slovakia	1	0	0	1
13	Hungary	0	2	3	5
14	Romania	0	2	2	4
15	Lithuania	0	1	1	2
16	Latvia	0	1	0	1
17	Belarus	0	0	2	2
17	Serbia	0	0	2	2
19	Moldova	0	0	1	1
19	Spain	0	0	1	1
Totals (20 entries)		21	21	42	84

== Team ranking ==
Rank	Men's freestyle		Men's Greco-Roman		Women's freestyle	
Rank	Team	Points	Team	Points	Team	Points
1	Russia	60	Russia	45	Ukraine	67
2	Georgia	52	Ukraine	36	Russia	53
3	Bulgaria	49	Azerbaijan	34	Sweden	31
4	Turkey	44	Bulgaria	30	Azerbaijan	31
5	Ukraine	30	Armenia	27	Poland	30
6	Belarus	28	Hungary	26	Romania	23
7	Hungary	27	Lithuania	26	Germany	20
8	Azerbaijan	26	Turkey	23	Norway	16
9	Armenia	19	Georgia	19	Latvia	15
10	Romania	16	Belarus	18	Bulgaria	15

== Medal summary ==
=== Men's freestyle ===
Event	Gold	Silver	Bronze
55 kg	Dzhamal Otarsultanov; Russia	Besarion Gochashvili; Georgia	Ahmet Peker; Turkey
55 kg	Dzhamal Otarsultanov; Russia	Besarion Gochashvili; Georgia	Radoslav Velikov; Bulgaria
60 kg	Toghrul Asgarov; Azerbaijan	Anatolie Guidea; Bulgaria	Rasul Murtazaliev; Russia
60 kg	Toghrul Asgarov; Azerbaijan	Anatolie Guidea; Bulgaria	Malkhaz Zarkua; Georgia
66 kg	Alan Gogayev; Russia	Leonid Bazan; Bulgaria	David Safaryan; Armenia
66 kg	Alan Gogayev; Russia	Leonid Bazan; Bulgaria	Gergő Wöller; Hungary
74 kg	Denis Tsargush; Russia	Davit Khutsishvili; Georgia	Aleksandr Gostiyev; Azerbaijan
74 kg	Denis Tsargush; Russia	Davit Khutsishvili; Georgia	Gábor Hatos; Hungary
84 kg	Dato Marsagishvili; Georgia	Mihail Ganev; Bulgaria	Gheorghita Stefan; Romania
84 kg	Dato Marsagishvili; Georgia	Mihail Ganev; Bulgaria	Anzor Urishev; Russia
96 kg	Abdusalam Gadisov; Russia	Valerii Andriitsev; Ukraine	Serhat Balcı; Turkey
96 kg	Abdusalam Gadisov; Russia	Valerii Andriitsev; Ukraine	Ivan Yankouski; Belarus
120 kg	Taha Akgül; Turkey	Dániel Ligeti; Hungary	Ihar Dziatko; Belarus
120 kg	Taha Akgül; Turkey	Dániel Ligeti; Hungary	Davit Modzmanashvili; Georgia

=== Men's Greco-Roman ===
Event	Gold	Silver	Bronze
55 kg	Elchin Aliyev; Azerbaijan	Péter Módos; Hungary	Aleksandar Kostadinov; Bulgaria
55 kg	Elchin Aliyev; Azerbaijan	Péter Módos; Hungary	Fatih Üçüncü; Turkey
60 kg	István Lévai; Slovakia	Ivo Angelov; Bulgaria	Arslan Abdullin; Russia
60 kg	István Lévai; Slovakia	Ivo Angelov; Bulgaria	Davor Štefanek; Serbia
66 kg	Frank Stabler; Germany	Georgian Carpen; Romania	Islambek Albiev; Russia
66 kg	Frank Stabler; Germany	Georgian Carpen; Romania	Aleksandar Maksimović; Serbia
74 kg	Roman Vlasov; Russia	Manuchar Tskhadaia; Georgia	Arsen Julfalakyan; Armenia
74 kg	Roman Vlasov; Russia	Manuchar Tskhadaia; Georgia	Aleksandr Kazakevič; Lithuania
84 kg	Hristo Marinov; Bulgaria	Damian Janikowski; Poland	Zhan Beleniuk; Ukraine
84 kg	Hristo Marinov; Bulgaria	Damian Janikowski; Poland	Viktor Lőrincz; Hungary
96 kg	Artur Aleksanyan; Armenia	Mindaugas Ežerskis; Lithuania	Shalva Gadabadze; Azerbaijan
96 kg	Artur Aleksanyan; Armenia	Mindaugas Ežerskis; Lithuania	Serhiy Rutenko; Ukraine
120 kg	Rıza Kayaalp; Turkey	Khasan Baroev; Russia	Yevhen Orlov; Ukraine
120 kg	Rıza Kayaalp; Turkey	Khasan Baroev; Russia	Yury Patrikeyev; Armenia

=== Women's freestyle ===
Event	Gold	Silver	Bronze
48 kg	Lyudmyla Balushka; Ukraine	Estera Dobre; Romania	Jacqueline Schellin; Germany
48 kg	Lyudmyla Balushka; Ukraine	Estera Dobre; Romania	Marina Vilmova; Russia
51 kg	Iwona Matkowska; Poland	Oleksandra Kohut; Ukraine	Alexandra Engelhardt; Germany
51 kg	Iwona Matkowska; Poland	Oleksandra Kohut; Ukraine	Katya Krasnova; Russia
55 kg	Nataliya Synyshyn; Ukraine	Sofia Mattsson; Sweden	Maria Gurova; Russia
55 kg	Nataliya Synyshyn; Ukraine	Sofia Mattsson; Sweden	Ana Maria Paval; Romania
59 kg	Hanna Vasylenko; Ukraine	Anastasija Grigorjeva; Latvia	Sona Ahmadli; Azerbaijan
59 kg	Hanna Vasylenko; Ukraine	Anastasija Grigorjeva; Latvia	Ludmila Cristea; Moldova
63 kg	Yuliya Ostapchuk; Ukraine	Natalia Smirnova; Russia	Monika Ewa Michalik; Poland
63 kg	Yuliya Ostapchuk; Ukraine	Natalia Smirnova; Russia	Elif Jale Yeşilırmak; Turkey
67 kg	Henna Johansson; Sweden	Alla Cherkasova; Ukraine	Dzhanan Manolova; Bulgaria
67 kg	Henna Johansson; Sweden	Alla Cherkasova; Ukraine	Nadya Sementsova; Azerbaijan
72 kg	Maja Erlandsen; Norway	Kateryna Burmistrova; Ukraine	Maider Unda; Spain
72 kg	Maja Erlandsen; Norway	Kateryna Burmistrova; Ukraine	Natalia Vorobieva; Russia

== Participating nations ==
478 competitors from 41 nations participated:

- Albania (10)
- Armenia (14)
- Austria (9)
- Azerbaijan (21)
- Belarus (21)
- Bulgaria (18)
- Croatia (7)
- Czech Republic (10)
- Cyprus (2)
- Denmark (3)
- Estonia (7)
- Finland (9)
- France (12)
- Georgia (14)
- Germany (21)
- Greece (17)
- United Kingdom (7)
- Hungary (18)
- Ireland (1)
- Israel (6)
- Italy (15)
- Latvia (12)
- Lithuania (13)
- Macedonia (9)
- Moldova (19)
- Monaco (1)
- Montenegro (2)
- Netherlands (1)
- Norway (7)
- Poland (19)
- Portugal (4)
- Romania (20)
- Russia (20)
- Serbia (20)
- Slovakia (12)
- Slovenia (1)
- Spain (10)
- Sweden (14)
- Switzerland (10)
- Turkey (21)
- Ukraine (21)
