= Wrestling at the 2006 Asian Games – Men's Greco-Roman 55 kg =

Men's Greco-Roman 55 kg at the 2006 Asian Games
- Venue: Aspire Hall 4
- Date: 10 December 2006
- Competitors: 13 from 13 nations

Medalists
gold medal	Jiao Huafeng	China
silver medal	Jasem Amiri	Iran
bronze medal	Vinayak Dalvi	India
bronze medal	Cha Kwang-su	North Korea

The men's Greco-Roman 55 kilograms wrestling competition at the 2006 Asian Games in Doha was held on 10 December 2006 at the Aspire Hall 4.

This Greco-Roman wrestling competition consisted of a single-elimination tournament, with a repechage used to determine the winner of two bronze medals. The two finalists faced off for gold and silver medals. Each wrestler who lost to one of the two finalists moved into the repechage, culminating in a pair of bronze medal matches featuring the semifinal losers each facing the remaining repechage opponent from their half of the bracket.

Each bout consisted of up to three rounds, lasting two minutes apiece. The wrestler who scored more points in each round was the winner of that rounds; the bout finished when one wrestler had won two rounds (and thus the match).

== Schedule ==
All times are Arabia Standard Time (UTC+03:00)

Date	Time	Event
Sunday, 10 December 2006	09:00	Preliminary
Sunday, 10 December 2006	09:00	Quarterfinals
Sunday, 10 December 2006	09:00	Semifinals
Sunday, 10 December 2006	09:00	Repechages
Sunday, 10 December 2006	18:00	Finals

== Results ==
=== Main bracket ===
Preliminary
Vinayak Dalvi (IND)	3	3
Đặng Đình Huệ (VIE)	0	2
Amjad Najah (IRQ)	0	3	0
Jasem Amiri (IRI)	4	2	4
Ali Al-Agzam (KSA)	0	1
Margarito Angana (PHI)	6	7
Yerbol Konyratov (KAZ)	1	0
Cha Kwang-su (PRK)	1	6
Park Eun-chul (KOR)	4	3	1
Masatoshi Toyota (JPN)	0	5	1

Quarterfinals
Rinat Usupjanov (KGZ)	6	0	4
Elbek Tojiev (UZB)	0	5	0
Jiao Huafeng (CHN)	6	3
Vinayak Dalvi (IND)	0	2
Jasem Amiri (IRI)	4	6
Margarito Angana (PHI)	3	0
Cha Kwang-su (PRK)	2	5
Masatoshi Toyota (JPN)	1	0

Semifinals
Rinat Usupjanov (KGZ)	0	4	0
Jiao Huafeng (CHN)	6	2	2
Jasem Amiri (IRI)	2	1	1
Cha Kwang-su (PRK)	1	3	1

Gold medal match
Jiao Huafeng (CHN)	2	1	5
Jasem Amiri (IRI)	3	1	4

=== Repechage ===
Repechage
Amjad Najah (IRQ)	6	0	3
Margarito Angana (PHI)	0	6	1

Bronze medal match
Vinayak Dalvi (IND)	5	2	4
Rinat Usupjanov (KGZ)	4	3	1
Amjad Najah (IRQ)	1	1
Cha Kwang-su (PRK)	1	4

== Final standing ==
Rank	Athlete
1st place, gold medalist(s)	Jiao Huafeng (CHN)
2nd place, silver medalist(s)	Jasem Amiri (IRI)
3rd place, bronze medalist(s)	Vinayak Dalvi (IND)
3rd place, bronze medalist(s)	Cha Kwang-su (PRK)
5	Rinat Usupjanov (KGZ)
5	Amjad Najah (IRQ)
7	Margarito Angana (PHI)
8	Masatoshi Toyota (JPN)
9	Park Eun-chul (KOR)
10	Elbek Tojiev (UZB)
11	Đặng Đình Huệ (VIE)
12	Yerbol Konyratov (KAZ)
13	Ali Al-Agzam (KSA)
