= 2013 European Wrestling Championships – Men's freestyle 55 kg =

The men's freestyle 55 kg is a competition featured at the 2013 European Wrestling Championships, and was held at the Tbilisi Sports Palace in Tbilisi, Georgia on 20 March 2013.

== Medalists ==
Gold	Giorgi Edisherashvili; Georgia
Silver	Uladzislau Andreyeu; Belarus
Bronze	Sezar Akgul; Turkey
Bronze	Yashar Aliyev; Azerbaijan

== Results ==
Legend

- F — Won by fall
- WO — Won by walkover

=== Main Draw ===
Round of 16
Juan Pablo González (ESP)	0	0
Alexandru Chirtoacă (MDA)	1	4
Sezar Akgül (TUR)	6	3
Adrian Hajduk (POL)	0	0
Uladzislau Andreyeu (BLR)	3	3
Georgi Vangelov (BUL)	0	1
Artem Gebekov (RUS)	5	1
Andrei Dukov (ROU)	1	0
Bence Juhász (HUN)	0	0
Mihran Jaburyan (ARM)	4	6^{F}
Yashar Aliyev (AZE)	2	0	0
Giorgi Edisherashvili (GEO)	1	1	2
Emanuel Krause (GER)	0	1
Zoheir El-Ouarraqe (FRA)	3	1

Quarterfinals
Iurii Liedienov (UKR)	0	0
Alexandru Chirtoacă (MDA)	1	7
Sezar Akgül (TUR)	1	2	2
Uladzislau Andreyeu (BLR)	0	2	4
Artem Gebekov (RUS)	4	4
Mihran Jaburyan (ARM)	0	0
Giorgi Edisherashvili (GEO)	1	1
Zoheir El-Ouarraqe (FRA)	0	0

Semifinals
Alexandru Chirtoacă (MDA)	0	1
Uladzislau Andreyeu (BLR)	1	2
Artem Gebekov (RUS)	0	3
Giorgi Edisherashvili (GEO)	1	5

Final
Uladzislau Andreyeu (BLR)	1	0	1
Giorgi Edisherashvili (GEO)	0	1	1

=== Repechage ===
Repechage round 1
Georgi Vangelov (BUL)	0	1	0
Sezar Akgül (TUR)	1	0	2
Yashar Aliyev (AZE)	W	O
Zoheir El-Ouarraqe (FRA)

Bronze medals
Sezar Akgül (TUR)	1	4
Alexandru Chirtoacă (MDA)	0	2
Yashar Aliyev (AZE)	1	3
Artem Gebekov (RUS)	1	0
