= Wrestling at the 2010 Asian Games – Men's Greco-Roman 55 kg =

Wrestling competition

Men's Greco-Roman 55 kg at the 2010 Asian Games
- Venue: Huagong Gymnasium
- Date: 21 November 2010
- Competitors: 15 from 15 nations

Medalists
gold medal	Kohei Hasegawa	Japan
silver medal	Kanybek Zholchubekov	Kyrgyzstan
bronze medal	Li Shujin	China
bronze medal	Marat Karishalov	Kazakhstan

The men's Greco-Roman 55 kilograms wrestling competition at the 2010 Asian Games in Guangzhou was held on 21 November 2010 at the Huagong Gymnasium.

This Greco-Roman wrestling competition consisted of a single-elimination tournament, with a repechage used to determine the winner of two bronze medals. The two finalists faced off for gold and silver medals. Each wrestler who lost to one of the two finalists moved into the repechage, culminating in a pair of bronze medal matches featuring the semifinal losers each facing the remaining repechage opponent from their half of the bracket.

Each bout consisted of up to three rounds, lasting two minutes apiece. The wrestler who scored more points in each round was the winner of that rounds; the bout finished when one wrestler had won two rounds (and thus the match).

== Schedule ==
All times are China Standard Time (UTC+08:00)

Date	Time	Event
Sunday, 21 November 2010	09:30	1/8 finals
Sunday, 21 November 2010	09:30	Quarterfinals
Sunday, 21 November 2010	09:30	Semifinals
Sunday, 21 November 2010	16:00	Repechages
Sunday, 21 November 2010	17:00	Finals

== Results ==
Legend

- F — Won by fall
- WO — Won by walkover

=== Main bracket ===
1/8 finals
Mohammed Abbas (IRQ)	W	O
Margarito Angana (PHI)
Li Shujin (CHN)	3	2
Rajender Kumar (IND)	0	1
Kanybek Zholchubekov (KGZ)	3	4
Ildar Hafizov (UZB)	0	0
Marat Karishalov (KAZ)	0	0
Kohei Hasegawa (JPN)	1	2
Kritsada Kongsrichai (THA)	6	1
Bahrullo Otamurodov (TJK)	0	0
Hamid Sourian (IRI)	0	3	5
Choi Gyu-jin (KOR)	1	0	0
Yun Won-chol (PRK)	6	4
Hồ Quang Hải (VIE)	0	0

Quarterfinals
Ardiansyah (INA)	0	0
Mohammed Abbas (IRQ)	6	2
Li Shujin (CHN)	0	0
Kanybek Zholchubekov (KGZ)	1	3
Kohei Hasegawa (JPN)	6	6
Kritsada Kongsrichai (THA)	0	0
Hamid Sourian (IRI)	6	5
Yun Won-chol (PRK)	0	0

Semifinals
Mohammed Abbas (IRQ)	0	1	0
Kanybek Zholchubekov (KGZ)	1	1	3
Kohei Hasegawa (JPN)	1	0	1
Hamid Sourian (IRI)	0	2	0

Final
Kanybek Zholchubekov (KGZ)	0	0
Kohei Hasegawa (JPN)	3	7^{F}

=== Repechage ===
Repechage round 1
Ildar Hafizov (UZB)	0	0
Li Shujin (CHN)	1	3
Marat Karishalov (KAZ)	6	7
Kritsada Kongsrichai (THA)	0	0

Bronze medals
Li Shujin (CHN)	1	1
Mohammed Abbas (IRQ)	0	0
Marat Karishalov (KAZ)	3	1
Hamid Sourian (IRI)	0	0

== Final standing ==
Rank	Athlete
1st place, gold medalist(s)	Kohei Hasegawa (JPN)
2nd place, silver medalist(s)	Kanybek Zholchubekov (KGZ)
3rd place, bronze medalist(s)	Li Shujin (CHN)
3rd place, bronze medalist(s)	Marat Karishalov (KAZ)
5	Mohammed Abbas (IRQ)
5	Hamid Sourian (IRI)
7	Yun Won-chol (PRK)
8	Kritsada Kongsrichai (THA)
9	Rajender Kumar (IND)
10	Choi Gyu-jin (KOR)
11	Margarito Angana (PHI)
12	Bahrullo Otamurodov (TJK)
13	Ardiansyah (INA)
14	Hồ Quang Hải (VIE)
15	Ildar Hafizov (UZB)
