= Anatolii Buruian =

Moldovan freestyle wrestler (born 1991)

Personal information
- Full name: Anatolii Buruian
- National team: Moldova
- Born: 16 April 1991 (age 34) Dănceni, Moldova, Soviet Union
- Height: 160 cm (5 ft 3 in)
- Weight: 57 kg (126 lb)

Sport
- Country: Moldova
- Sport: Amateur wrestling
- Rank: Master of sports in freestyle wrestling
- Event: Freestyle
- Club: Bai-Tur; Chisinau
- Coached by: Piotr Buiucli; Vasile Binzaru (since 2010)

Anatolii Buruian (born 16 April 1991) is a Moldovan former freestyle wrestler who has been junior European champion (2010) and thrice junior world bronze medalist (2009, 2010, 2011). Senior Moldovan national champion in freestyle wrestling 2019.

== Career ==
=== Age-group ===
He earned his first medal at the 2006 Cadet European championships held in Istanbul, Turkey, he won a bronze medal in the men's 46 kg event. In 2009, Buruian won a bronze medal at the junior world championships in men's freestyle 50 kg event. In 2010, he won the European title at the junior European championships in the men's 50 kg event, after the junior European championships he won a bronze medal at the junior world championships in men's 50 kg event. In 2011, he came third at the world junior championships held in Bucharest, Romania, Anatolii won a bronze medal in men's 50 kg event.

=== Senior level ===
He made his debut in senior level at the Ion Corneanu memorial and won a silver medal. He competed in the men's 57 kg event at the 2017 World Wrestling Championships held in Paris, France, where he was eliminated in his first match by Andrei Dukov of Romania. On January 23, 2019, he became the winner of Dave Schultz memorial held in Colorado Springs, Colorado, United States, in the final match, he defeated Canada's Steven Takahashi. On August 1, 2019, he became runner-up at the international Ion Cornianu and Ladislau Simon memorial. At the 2019 World Wrestling Championships in men's event 50 kg he lost to senior world championships runner-up Daton Fix from the United States. On January 26, 2020, he competed at the Grand Prix Ivan Yarygin held in Krasnoyarsk, Russia, where he won his first match against Dashtseren Purvee from Mongolia, but in next match he was eliminated by Aryan Tsiutryn of Russia. On February 14, 2020, he competed at European Wrestling Championships and finished in 9th place. At the 2020 Individual Wrestling World Cup he became only 23th. In 2021, at the European Wrestling Championships held in Warsaw, Poland he lost in his first match to Răzvan Kovacs of Romania and became 10th. At the 2022 European Championships came in 8th place and one year later at the 2023 European Championships held in Zagreb, Croatia finished in 11th place.

== Achievements ==
Year	Tournament	Location	Result	Event
2006	Cadet European Championships	Istanbul, Turkey	3rd	Freestyle 42 kg
2009	Junior World Championships	Ankara, Turkey	3rd	Freestyle 50 kg
2009	Junior European Championships	Tbilisi, Georgia	2nd	Freestyle 50 kg
2010	Junior European Championships	Samoko, Bulgaria	1st	Freestyle 50 kg
2010	Junior World Championships	Budapest, Hungary	3rd	Freestyle 50 kg
2011	Junior World Championships	Bucharest, Romania	3rd	Freestyle 50 kg
