= Victoria Anthony =

American mixed martial artist (born 1991)

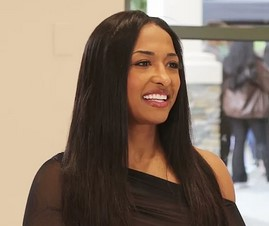
- Anthony in 2025
- Born: Victoria Lacey Anthony; June 24, 1991 (age 35); Huntington Beach, California, U.S.
- Nickname: Vortex
- Height: 4 ft 10 in (147 cm)
- Weight: 109 lb (49 kg; 7 st 11 lb)
- Division: Flyweight (2021–present); 50 kg (freestyle wrestling)
- Style: Freestyle wrestling
- Fighting out of: Scottsdale, Arizona, U.S.
- Team: Fight Ready (MMA); Sunkist Kids (wrestling)
- Trainer: Paul Ragusa
- Years active: 2021-present (MMA); 2009–2021 (wrestling)

Mixed martial arts record
- Total: 4
- Wins: 3
- By decision: 3
- Losses: 1
- By submission: 1

Other information
- University: Simon Fraser University
- Notable school: Marina High School
- Mixed martial arts record from Sherdog

Victoria Anthony (born June 24, 1991) is an American mixed martial artist and former freestyle wrestler. She was a two-time Junior World Champion, a two-time U.S. Open Champion, and a three-time Pan American Champion.

Anthony was the first women's wrestler to win four collegiate national titles.

The Anthony-Maroulis Trophy is named after Anthony and Helen Maroulis, and is awarded annually to the top performer in women's collegiate wrestling.

== Career ==
=== Wrestling ===
Anthony originally trained in judo from the age of 6 to 14, and at one point was in the same camp as Ronda Rousey. She wrestled for Marina High School, winning the California state championship at 103 lbs. as a senior in 2009.

She won gold at the Junior World Championships in 2009 and 2010.

While wrestling for Simon Fraser University in 2014, Anthony became the first four-time women's national champion in history.

Anthony won gold at the Pan American Wrestling Championships in 2014, 2017, and 2020.

In January 2015, she won gold at the Dave Schultz Memorial.

In 2016, she failed to qualify for the Olympics, placing second in the American best-of-three series trials after losing to Haley Augello. Anthony lost the first match, won the second match, and lost the third match.

She competed at the 2020 Ivan Yarygin international, losing in the qualification round to Russia's Nadezhda Sokolova, but continuing on to win a bronze medal in repechage.

In 2021, she won a gold medal in the 50 kg weight class at the Matteo Pellicone Ranking Series held in Rome, Italy.

=== Mixed martial arts ===
After serving as an alternate for Team USA at the 2020 Summer Olympics but not competing, Anthony transitioned to mixed martial arts.

She debuted at the Global Association of Mixed Martial Arts (GAMMA) World Championships on March 27, 2022, defeating Sarita Rathod by decision.

Anthony competed at the International Mixed Martial Arts Federation (IMMAF) World Championships on February 14, 2023, defeating Vridhi Kumari by decision. She lost her semifinal bout the following day to Magdalena Czaban by submission.

On August 27, 2023, she defeated Dania Cruz by decision at Fury FC 82.

== Personal life ==
Anthony has been in a relationship with mixed martial artist Tom Clarke since 2022.

She was inducted into the California Wrestling Hall of Fame in 2025.

USA Wrestling's Women's College Wrestler of the Year award was renamed the Anthony-Maroulis Trophy to honor Anthony and Helen Maroulis in 2026.
