= Fatih Yaşarlı =

Turkish freestyle wrestler

Personal information
- Born: 5 March 1991 (age 35) Erzurum
- Height: 1.84 m (6 ft 0 in)
- Weight: 97 kg (214 lb; 15.3 st)

Sport
- Country: Turkey
- Sport: Amateur wrestling
- Weight class: 97 kg - 125 kg
- Event: Freestyle
- Club: Ankara Tedaş
Medal record
Men's freestyle wrestling
Representing Turkey
Military World Games
Bronze medal – third place	2019 Wuhan	97 kg
Yasar Dogu Tournament
Gold medal – first place	2016 Istanbul	97 kg
Silver medal – second place	2021 Istanbul	125 kg
Bronze medal – third place	2017 Istanbul	97 kg
Bronze medal – third place	2018 Istanbul	97 kg
Bronze medal – third place	2023 Istanbul	125 kg
World University Championship
Gold medal – first place	2014 Pecs	97 kg
Bronze medal – third place	2016 Çorum	97 kg
World Juniors Championships
Bronze medal – third place	2009 Ankara	96 kg
Bronze medal – third place	2010 Budapest	96 kg
European Juniors Championships
Bronze medal – third place	2010 Samokov	96 kg
European Cadets Championships
Bronze medal – third place	2008 Daugavpils	96 kg

Fatih Yaşarlı is a Turkish freestyle wrestler competing in the 125 kg and +90 kg in beach wrestling divisions. He is a member of Ankara İlbank.

== Career ==
In 2016 European Wrestling Championships, he finished tenth. At the 2009 Mediterranean Games, he placed fifth. He was the 2014 champion and 2016 third in the University Games. He competed in 2009 and 2010 World Junior Championships and placed 3rd. At the 2017 Yaşar Doğu International Wrestling Tournament, he won a bronze medal.

In 2019, he won bronze medal in the men's 97 kg event at the 2019 Military World Games held in Wuhan, China.

He won the gold medal by defeating his Georgian rival Mamuka Kordzaia in the +90 kg final match at the 2022 World Beach Wrestling Championships held in Saint Laurent du Var in France.
