= Jasem Amiri =

Iranian wrestler (born 1987)

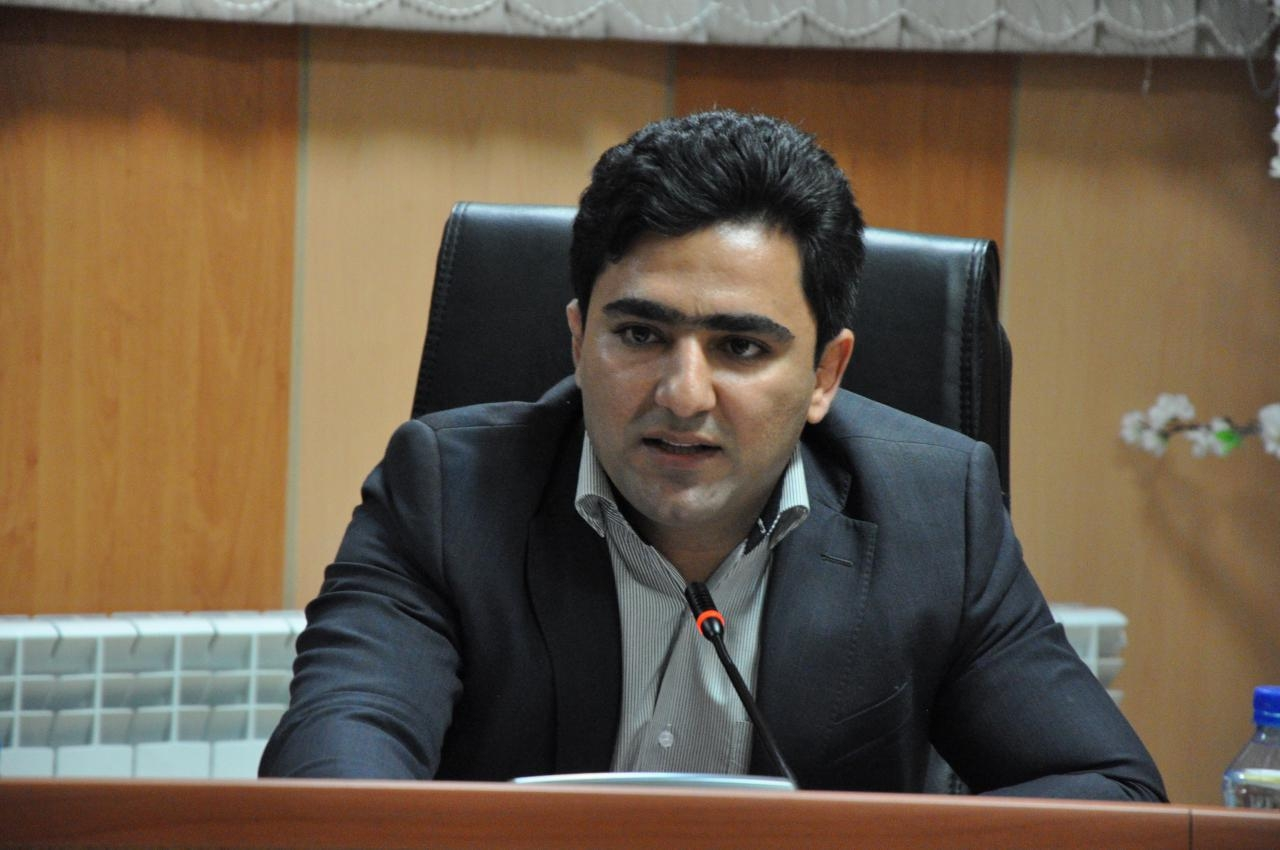
- Amiri in 2018

Personal information
- Native name: جاسم امیری
- Full name: Jasem Amiri
- Nickname: silver men
- Nationality: Iranian
- Born: 24 February 1987 (age 39) Poldokhtar
Medal record
Men's Greco-Roman wrestling
Representing Iran
Asian Games
Silver medal – second place	2006 Doha	55 kg

Jasem Amiri (Persian: جاسم امیری, born February 24, 1987) is a retired Iranian wrestler. He is a Greco-Roman wrestler from Iran, who started wrestling at a young age and won many medals, including the runner-up in the World Championship in Guatemala and silver in the Doha Asian Games in 2006, and also won several titles in Asian competitions. Some time after retirement, after 3 years of injury, he returned to the field and became the runner-up of the world student tournament in Turin, Italy.

== Sports Achievements ==
- Gold medal of World Children's Day competition, Tehran 2002
- Silver medal of under-17 Asian Championship wrestling, Taipei 2003
- Silver medal of the World Youth Championship, Guatemala 2006
- Gold under 17 Asian Championship, Bishkek 2006
- Silver medal of the Asian games Doha 2006
- Silver medal of under-18 Asian championship wrestling, Philippines 2007
- Silver medal of the World Student Championship, Italy 2010
- Padubeni cup silver medal, Russia 2006

== Job Activities ==
- Adviser to the governor
- Member of Mohammadshahr city council in the fourth term
- Adviser to the Governor in the Karaj City Council
- Executive advisor of the International Martial Arts Federation
- Member of the National Olympic Committee of Iran
- The head coach of the national under-15 wrestling team of Iran
- Coaching history of Iran's national youth and teenager and adult wrestling team
