= Soner Sucu =

Turkish wrestler (born 1986)

Personal information
- Nationality: Turkey
- Born: 3 September 1986 (age 39) Amasya, Turkey
- Height: 1.66 m (5 ft 5 1/2 in)
- Weight: 60 kg (132 lb)

Sport
- Sport: Wrestling
- Event: Greco-Roman
- Club: Bueyuek Sehir Belediyesi
- Coached by: Hakki Basar
Medal record
Men's Greco-Roman wrestling
Representing Turkey
Mediterranean Games
Bronze medal – third place	2009 Pescara	60 kg

Soner Sucu (born September 3, 1986, in Amasya) is an amateur Turkish Greco-Roman wrestler, who competes in the men's lightweight category. He won a bronze medal in his division at the 2009 Mediterranean Games in Pescara, Italy. Sucu is a member of the wrestling team for Bueyuek Sehir Belediyesi, and is coached and trained by Hakki Basar.

Sucu represented Turkey at the 2008 Summer Olympics in Beijing, where he competed in the men's 60 kg class. He received a bye for the second preliminary round match, before losing out to Russia's Islambek Albiev, who was able to score six points each in two straight periods, leaving Sucu without a single point. Because his opponent advanced further into the final match, Sucu was offered another shot for the bronze medal by entering the repechage bouts. Unfortunately, he was defeated in the second round by Cuban wrestler and Olympic silver medalist Roberto Monzón, with a three-set technical score (3–1, 2–4, 1–1), and a classification point score of 1–3.
