= Ali Elçin =

Azerbaijani and Turkish Greco-Roman wrestler

Personal information
- Born: June 24, 1990 (age 36)

Sport
- Country: Turkey
- Sport: Amateur wrestling
- Event: Greco-Roman
- Club: Ankara Aski Sport Club
Medal record
Men's Greco-Roman wrestling
Representing Turkey
Mediterranean Games
Silver medal – second place	2018 Tarragona	60 kg
Representing Azerbaijan
European Championships
Silver medal – second place	2013 Tbilisi	55 kg
Gold medal – first place	2012 Belgrad	55 kg
Gold medal – first place	2010 Baku	55 kg

Ali Elçin (né Elchin Aliyev; born 1990) is an Azerbaijani and Turkish Greco-Roman wrestler competing in the 55 kg division. He is a member of Bursa BBSK.

== Career ==
Aliyev won a gold medal at the 2010 European Wrestling Championships in Baku and at the 2012 European Wrestling Championships in Belgrade. He also won a silver medal at the 2013 European Wrestling Championships in Tbilisi.
