= Woo Seung-jae =

South Korean wrestler

Medal record

Men's Greco-Roman wrestling

Representing South Korea

World Championships
Bronze medal – third place	2013 Budapest	60 kg

Woo Seung-Jae (우승재) is a male wrestler from South Korea. He beat Poland's Edward Barsegjan in the bronze medal match of the 60 kg Greco-Roman wrestling class in the 2013 World Wrestling Championships.
