= Wrestling at the 2018 Asian Games – Men's Greco-Roman 60 kg =

Men's Greco-Roman 60 kg at the 2018 Asian Games
- Venue: Jakarta Convention Center
- Date: 21 August 2018
- Competitors: 14 from 14 nations

Medalists
gold medal	Shinobu Ota	Japan
silver medal	Kanybek Zholchubekov	Kyrgyzstan
bronze medal	Meirambek Ainagulov	Kazakhstan
bronze medal	Mehrdad Mardani	Iran

The men's Greco-Roman 60 kilograms wrestling competition at the 2018 Asian Games in Jakarta was held on 21 August 2018 at the Jakarta Convention Center Assembly Hall.

== Schedule ==
All times are Western Indonesia Time (UTC+07:00)

Date	Time	Event
Tuesday, 21 August 2018	13:00	1/8 finals
Tuesday, 21 August 2018	13:00	Quarterfinals
Tuesday, 21 August 2018	13:00	Semifinals
Tuesday, 21 August 2018	13:00	Repechages
Tuesday, 21 August 2018	19:00	Finals

== Results ==
Legend

- F — Won by fall

=== Main bracket ===
1/8 finals
Gamal Al-Sabri (YEM)	0
Walihan Sailike (CHN)	9
Ri Se-ung (PRK)	2
Kanybek Zholchubekov (KGZ)	10
Islomjon Bakhromov (UZB)	10
Lin Yu-hung (TPE)	0
Piyabut Wiratul (THA)	2
Gyanender Dahiya (IND)	10
Mehrdad Mardani (IRI)	7
Kim Seung-hak (KOR)	3
Hasan Sidik (INA)	0
Shinobu Ota (JPN)	8

Quarterfinals
Đới Đăng Tiến (VIE)	0
Meirambek Ainagulov (KAZ)	9
Walihan Sailike (CHN)	1
Kanybek Zholchubekov (KGZ)	6
Islomjon Bakhromov (UZB)	5
Gyanender Dahiya (IND)	0
Mehrdad Mardani (IRI)	0
Shinobu Ota (JPN)	9

Semifinals
Meirambek Ainagulov (KAZ)	0
Kanybek Zholchubekov (KGZ)	9
Islomjon Bakhromov (UZB)	0
Shinobu Ota (JPN)	6

Final
Kanybek Zholchubekov (KGZ)	3
Shinobu Ota (JPN)	8^{F}

=== Repechage ===
Repechage round 1
Ri Se-ung (PRK)	9
Walihan Sailike (CHN)	0
Hasan Sidik (INA)	0
Mehrdad Mardani (IRI)	9

Bronze medals
Ri Se-ung (PRK)	5
Meirambek Ainagulov (KAZ)	13
Mehrdad Mardani (IRI)	8
Islomjon Bakhromov (UZB)	0

== Final standing ==
Rank	Athlete
1st place, gold medalist(s)	Shinobu Ota (JPN)
2nd place, silver medalist(s)	Kanybek Zholchubekov (KGZ)
3rd place, bronze medalist(s)	Meirambek Ainagulov (KAZ)
3rd place, bronze medalist(s)	Mehrdad Mardani (IRI)
5	Ri Se-ung (PRK)
5	Islomjon Bakhromov (UZB)
7	Walihan Sailike (CHN)
8	Gyanender Dahiya (IND)
9	Kim Seung-hak (KOR)
10	Piyabut Wiratul (THA)
11	Gamal Al-Sabri (YEM)
11	Đới Đăng Tiến (VIE)
13	Lin Yu-hung (TPE)
14	Hasan Sidik (INA)
