= 2016 European Wrestling Championships – Men's Greco-Roman 66 kg =

The men's Greco-Roman 66 kg is a competition featured at the 2016 European Wrestling Championships, and was held in Riga, Latvia on March 12.

== Medalists ==
Gold	Islambek Albiev; Russia
Silver	Davor Štefanek; Serbia
Bronze	Kamran Mammadov; Azerbaijan
Bronze	Shmagi Bolkvadze; Georgia

== Results ==
Legend

- F — Won by fall

=== Final ===
Final
Islambek Albiev (RUS)	9
Davor Štefanek (SRB)	0

=== Top half ===
==== Section 1 ====
Round of 32

Round of 16
Maxim Mamulat (MDA)	0
Matthias Maasch (GER)	5
Marius Thommesen (NOR)	0
Edgaras Venckaitis (LTU)	4
Kamran Mammadov (AZE)	8
Carl Ekstroem (DEN)	0
Krisztian Jager (HUN)	4
Davor Štefanek (SRB)	5

Quarterfinals
Matthias Maasch (GER)	0
Edgaras Venckaitis (LTU)	3
Kamran Mammadov (AZE)	4
Davor Štefanek (SRB)	8

Semifinals
Edgaras Venckaitis (LTU)	1
Davor Štefanek (SRB)	6

=== Bottom half ===
==== Section 2 ====
Round of 32
Islambek Albiev (RUS)	8
Hrachia Malkhasyan (FRA)	0
Frunze Harutuynyan (SWE)	1
Shmagi Bolkvadze (GEO)	4
Danijel Janecic (CRO)	2
Georgian Carpen (ROM)	0
Mihran Harutyunyan (ARM)	6
Grzegorz Wanke (POL)	4
Nikita Masjuks (LAT)	8
Vladimiros Matias (GRE)	4
Denys Demyankov (UKR)	3
Atakan Yuksel (TUR)	1
Konstantin Stas (BUL)	2^{F}
Michail Sjamjonau (BLR)	4

Round of 16
Filip Dubský (CZE)	0
Islambek Albiev (RUS)	8
Shmagi Bolkvadze (GEO)	8
Danijel Janecic (CRO)	0
Mihran Harutyunyan (ARM)	2
Nikita Masjuks (LAT)	3
Denys Demyankov (UKR)	6
Konstantin Stas (BUL)	13

Quarterfinals
Islambek Albiev (RUS)	8
Shmagi Bolkvadze (GEO)	4
Nikita Masjuks (LAT)	5
Konstantin Stas (BUL)	4

Semifinals
Islambek Albiev (RUS)	4
Nikita Masjuks (LAT)	0

=== Repechage ===
Repechage round 1
Hrachia Malkhasyan (FRA)	2
Filip Dubský (CZE)	1

Repechage round 2
Krisztian Jager (HUN)	2
Kamran Mammadov (AZE)	3
Hrachia Malkhasyan (FRA)	2
Shmagi Bolkvadze (GEO)	9

Bronze medals
Kamran Mammadov (AZE)	6
Edgaras Venckaitis (LTU)	4
Shmagi Bolkvadze (GEO)	6
Nikita Masjuks (LAT)	4
