= Fatih Üçüncü =

Turkish Greco-Roman wrestler (born 1989)

Personal information
- Nationality: Turkish
- Born: 14 March 1989 (age 37) Samsun, Turkey
- Height: 1.65 m (5 ft 5 in)
- Weight: 55 kg (121 lb)

Sport
- Country: Turkey
- Sport: Sport wrestling
- Event: Greco-Roman
- Club: Ankara ASKI SK
Medal record
Men's Greco-Roman wrestling
Representing Turkey
European Championships
Bronze medal – third place	2013 Tbilisi	55 kg
Bronze medal – third place	2012 Belgrade	55 kg
Mediterranean Games
Silver medal – second place	2013 Mersin	55 kg
Grand Prix de France Henri Deglane
Bronze medal – third place	2021 Nice	63 kg

Fatih Üçüncü (born 14 March 1989 in Samsun, Turkey) is a male wrestler from Turkey competing in the 55 kg division of Greco–Roman style. He is a member of Ankara ASKİ SK since 2008.

Üçüncü began with wrestling in 2000.

He won the bronze medal at the 2012 European Wrestling Championships in Belgrade, Serbia and repeated his same success at the 2013 European Wrestling Championships held in Tbilisi, Georgia.
