= Yashar Aliyev (wrestler) =

Azerbaijani freestyle wrestler

Medal record

Representing Azerbaijan

Men's Freestyle Wrestling

European Championships
| Bronze medal – third place | 2013 Tbilisi | 55 kg |

Yashar Aliyev (Azerbaijani: Yaşar Əliyev) is an Azerbaijani freestyle wrestler.

Aliyev won a bronze medal at the 2013 European Wrestling Championships in Tbilisi.
