= Aleksandar Kostadinov =

Bulgarian Greco-Roman wrestler

Personal information
- Full name: Aleksandar Stoyanov Kostadinov
- Nationality: (Bulgaria) Bulgarian
- Born: 28 July 1988 (age 37) Kyustendil, Bulgaria
- Height: 1.60 m (5 ft 3 in)
- Weight: 55 kg (121 lb)

Sport
- Sport: Wrestling
- Event: Greco-Roman
- Club: Slavia Litex
- Coached by: Bratan Tzenov
Medal record
Men's Greco-Roman wrestling
Representing Bulgaria
European Championships
Bronze medal – third place	2009 Vilnius	55 kg
Bronze medal – third place	2012 Belgrade	55 kg
Gold medal – first place	2014 Vantaa	59 kg

Aleksandar Stoyanov Kostadinov (Bulgarian: Александър Стоянов Костадинов; born July 28, 1988) is an amateur Bulgarian Greco-Roman wrestler, who competes in the men's featherweight category. He won a bronze medal for his division at the 2012 European Wrestling Championships in Belgrade, Serbia. He is also a member of Slavia Litex Wrestling Club in Sofia, and is coached and trained by Bratan Tzenov.

Kostadinov represented Bulgaria at the 2012 Summer Olympics in London, where he competed in the men's 55 kg class. He received a bye for the preliminary round of sixteen, before losing out to China's Li Shujin, with a three-set technical score (2–0, 0–2, 0–2), and a classification point score of 1–3.
