= Harutyun Hovhannisyan =

Armenian Greco-Roman wrestler

Personal information
- Born: 24 December 1988 (age 37) Ararat, Armenia
- Height: 1.65 m (5 ft 5 in)
- Weight: 55 kg (121 lb)

Sport
- Sport: Wrestling
- Event: Greco-Roman
Medal record
Representing Armenia
Men's Greco-Roman wrestling
World Cup
Bronze medal – third place	2013 Tehran	55 kg

Harutyun Hovhannisyan (Armenian: Հարություն Հովհաննիսյանը, December 1988) is an Armenian Greco-Roman wrestler.

Hovhannisyan was a member of the Armenian Greco-Roman wrestling team at the 2013 Wrestling World Cup. The Armenian team came in fourth place. Hovhannisyan personally won a bronze medal.
