= Kohei Hasegawa =

Japanese Greco-Roman wrestler

Personal information
- Nationality: Japan
- Born: 22 November 1984 (age 41) Yaizu, Shizuoka, Japan
- Height: 1.64 m (5 ft 4 1/2 in)
- Weight: 55 kg (121 lb)

Sport
- Sport: Wrestling
- Event: Greco-Roman
- Club: Fukuichi Gyogyo Co. Ltd.
- Coached by: Hiroshi Ohta
Medal record
Men's Greco-Roman wrestling
Representing Japan
Asian Games
Gold medal – first place	2010 Guangzhou	55 kg
Gold medal – first place	2014 Incheon	59 kg
Asian Championships
Gold medal – first place	2009 Pattaya	55 kg
Bronze medal – third place	2008 Jeju City	55 kg

Kohei Hasegawa (長谷川 恒平, Hasegawa Kōhei; born November 22, 1984 in Yaizu, Shizuoka) is an amateur Japanese Greco-Roman wrestler, who competed in the men's featherweight category. He won two gold medals in his division at the 2009 Asian Wrestling Championships in Pattaya, Thailand, and at the 2010 Asian Games in Guangzhou, China, defeating India's Jogender Singh and pinning Kyrgyzstan's Kanybek Zholchubekov, respectively. Hasegawa is also a member of the wrestling team for Fukuichi Gyogyo Co. Ltd., and is coached and trained by Hiroshi Ohta.

Hasegawa represented Japan at the 2012 Summer Olympics in London, where he competed in the men's 55 kg class. He defeated Belarus' Elbek Tazhyieu in the preliminary round of sixteen, before losing out the quarterfinal match to Danish wrestler and two-time Olympian Håkan Nyblom, who was able to score four points in two straight periods, leaving Hasegawa without a single point.
