= Valeriya Chepsarakova =

Russian freestyle wrestler

Personal information
- Full name: Valeriya Chepsarakova
- Nationality: Russia
- Born: January 31, 1989 (age 37) Russia
- Weight: 48 kg (106 lb)

Sport
- Sport: Wrestling
- Event: Freestyle
Medal record
Women's freestyle wrestling
Representing Russia
European Championships
Gold medal – first place	2013 Tbilisi	48 kg

Valeriya Chepsarakova is a Russian Women's Freestyle Wrestler who won the gold medal at the 2013 European Wrestling Championships in the 48 kg weight division defeating Yana Stadnik of Great Britain 1–0, 1–0.
