= Elbek Tazhyieu =

Belarusian Greco-Roman wrestler (born 1986)

Medal record

Men's Greco-Roman wrestling

Representing Belarus

World Championships
Silver medal – second place	2011 Istanbul	55 kg

European Championships
Gold medal – first place	2013 Tbilisi	55 kg
Bronze medal – third place	2011 Dortmund	55 kg

Elbek Tazhyieu (born January 7, 1986) (also known as Elbek Tojiev) is a male Greco-Roman wrestler from Belarus. He represented Uzbekistan from 2003 to 2007, but represented Belarus at the 2012 Summer Olympics in the men's -55 kg division, where he lost in the second round to Japanese wrestler Kohei Hasegawa.
