= Bekkhan Mankiev =

Russian wrestler

Medal record

Men's Greco-Roman wrestling

Representing Russia

World Championships
Bronze medal – third place	2011 Istanbul	55 kg

European Championships
Bronze medal – third place	2009 Vilnius	55 kg
Bronze medal – third place	2013 Tbilisi	55 kg

Bekkhan Yunuzovich Mankiev (Russian: Бекхан Юнузович Манкиев; born September 15, 1986, in Surkhakhi, Ingushetia, Soviet Union) is a male wrestler from Russia.

His older brother Nazyr Mankiev is an Olympic gold medalist.
