= Ivo Angelov =

Bulgarian Greco-Roman wrestler

Personal information
- Full name: Ivo Serafimov Angelov
- Nationality: Bulgaria
- Born: 15 October 1984 (age 41) Pernik, Bulgaria
- Height: 1.64 m (5 ft 4 1/2 in)
- Weight: 60 kg (132 lb)

Sport
- Sport: Wrestling
- Event: Greco-Roman
- Club: Pernik Wrestling Club
- Coached by: Armen Nazaryan
Medal record
Men's Greco-Roman wrestling
Representing Bulgaria
World Championships
Bronze medal – third place	2011 Istanbul	60 kg
Gold medal – first place	2013 Budapest	60 kg
European Championships
Bronze medal – third place	2005 Varna	55 kg
Bronze medal – third place	2009 Vilnius	60 kg
Silver medal – second place	2011 Dortmund	60 kg
Silver medal – second place	2012 Belgrade	60 kg
Gold medal – first place	2013 Tbilisi	60 kg
Silver medal – second place	2017 Novi Sad	59 kg

Ivo Serafimov Angelov (Bulgarian: Иво Серафимов Ангелов; born 15 October 1984 in Pernik) is an amateur Bulgarian Greco-Roman wrestler, who played for the men's lightweight category. In 2011, Angelov had won a bronze medal for his division at the World Wrestling Championships in Istanbul, Turkey, and silver at the European Wrestling Championships in Dortmund, Germany. Angelov is also a member of Lovech Wrestling Club, and is coached and trained by Bratan Tzenov.

Angelov represented Bulgaria at the 2012 Summer Olympics in London, where he competed for the men's 60 kg class. He defeated United States' Ellis Coleman in the qualification rounds, before losing out the preliminary round of sixteen match to Iran's Omid Norouzi, who was able to score four points in two straight periods, leaving Angelov without a single point. Because his opponent advanced further into the final match, Angelov offered another shot for the bronze medal by eliminating China's Sheng Jiang in the repechage rounds. He lost the second repechage bout to Kazakhstan's Almat Kebispayev, with a score of 0–3. On 16 December 2013, he was honoured with the Bulgarian Sportsperson of the Year award.

In March 2021, he competed at the European Qualification Tournament in Budapest, Hungary hoping to qualify for the 2020 Summer Olympics in Tokyo, Japan.
