= Jessica MacDonald =

Canadian wrestler (born 1985)

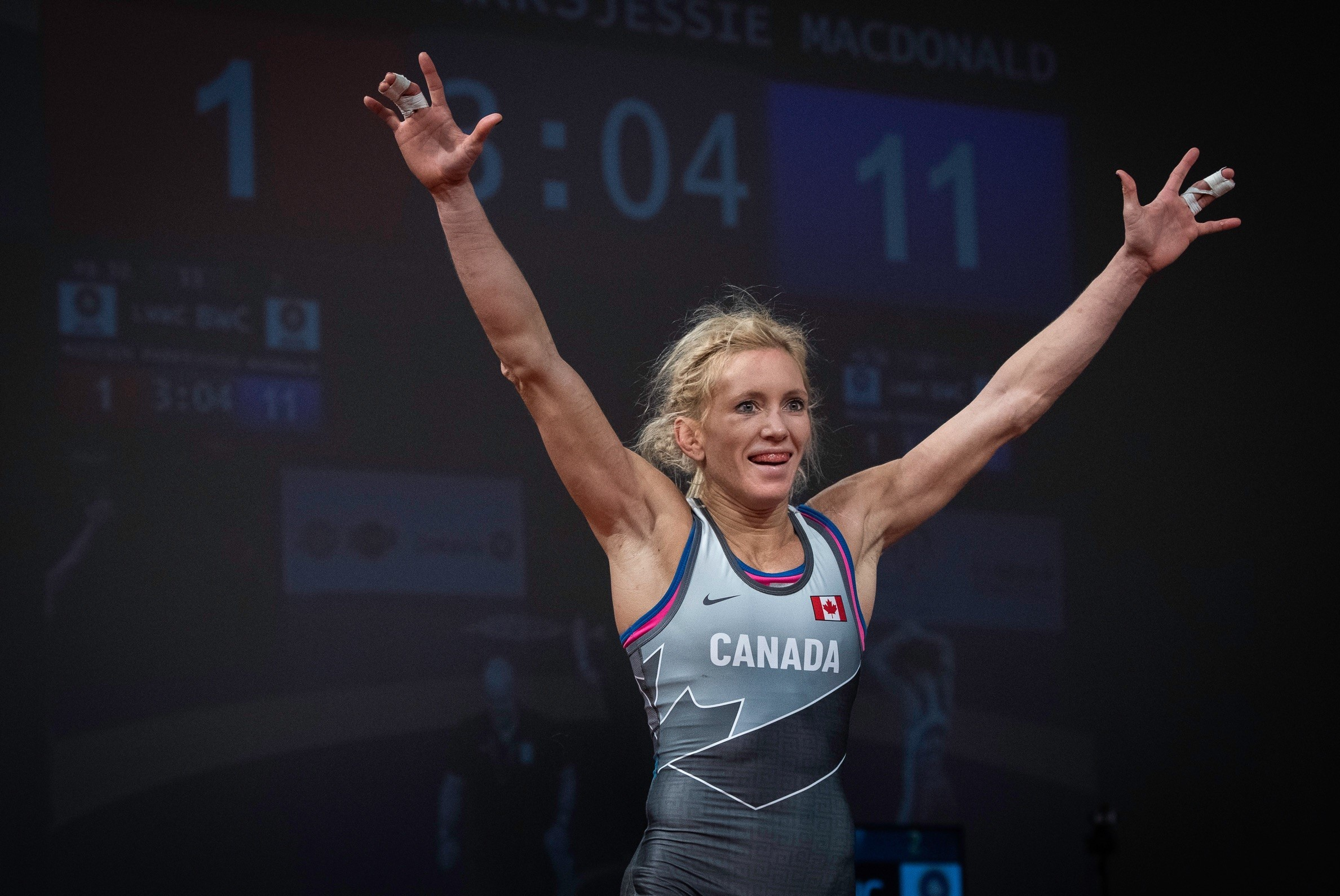
- MacDonald in 2019

Personal information
- Full name: Jessica Anne Marie MacDonald
- Born: July 12, 1985 (age 41) Windsor, Ontario, Canada
- Height: 1.65 m (5 ft 5 in)
- Weight: 48 kg (106 lb)

Sport
- Sport: Wrestling
Medal record
Women's freestyle wrestling
Representing Canada
World Championships
Gold medal – first place	2012 Strathcona County	51 kg
Bronze medal – third place	2011 Istanbul	51 kg
Bronze medal – third place	2013 Budapest	51 kg
World Cup
Gold medal – first place	2011 Lievan	51 kg
Gold medal – first place	2010 Nanjing	51 kg
Commonwealth Games
Silver medal – second place	2018 Gold Coast	50 kg
Bronze medal – third place	2010 New Delhi	51 kg
Pan American Championships
Gold medal – first place	2011 Rionegro	51kg
Gold medal – first place	2012 Colorado Springs	51kg
Gold medal – first place	2013 Panama City	51kg
Gold medal – first place	2017 Salvador de Bahia	53kg
Silver medal – second place	2014 Mexico City	48kg
Olympic Qualification Tournaments
Bronze medal – third place	2020 Ottawa	50kg
World University Championships
Bronze medal – third place	2008 Thessaloniki	51kg
- Updated on 30 July 2014

Jessica MacDonald (born July 12, 1985; née Bondy) is a wrestler from Canada. She began wrestling for Brock University in St. Catharines, Ontario in 2003. She is a three-time world medalist, and in 2012 earned the title of World Champion while competing in the 51 kg weight class of female wrestling.

In March 2018, MacDonald was named to Canada's 2018 Commonwealth Games team. She was also the winner of the 2019 Olympic Canadian wrestling trials in the 50 kg weight class.
