= Patimat Bagomedova =

Azerbaijani wrestler (born 1993)

Medal record

Women's freestyle wrestling

Representing Azerbaijan

World Championships
| Bronze medal – third place | 2011 Istanbul | 51 kg |

European Championships
| Bronze medal – third place | 2013 Tbilisi | 48 kg |

Summer Universiade
| Silver medal – second place | Kazan 2013 | 48 kg |

Youth Olympic Games
| Gold medal – first place | 2010 Singapore | 52 kg |

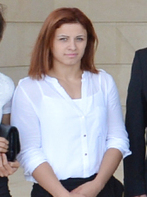
Patimat Bagomedova

Patimat Bagomedova (Azerbaijani: Patimət Bəhəmmədova; born August 6, 1993) is an Azerbaijani wrestler who participated at the 2010 Summer Youth Olympics in Singapore. She won the gold medal in the girls' freestyle 52 kg event, defeating Yuan Yuan of China in the final.
