= Islambek Albiev =

Russian wrestler of Chechen descent

Islambek Albiev Исламбек Альбиев
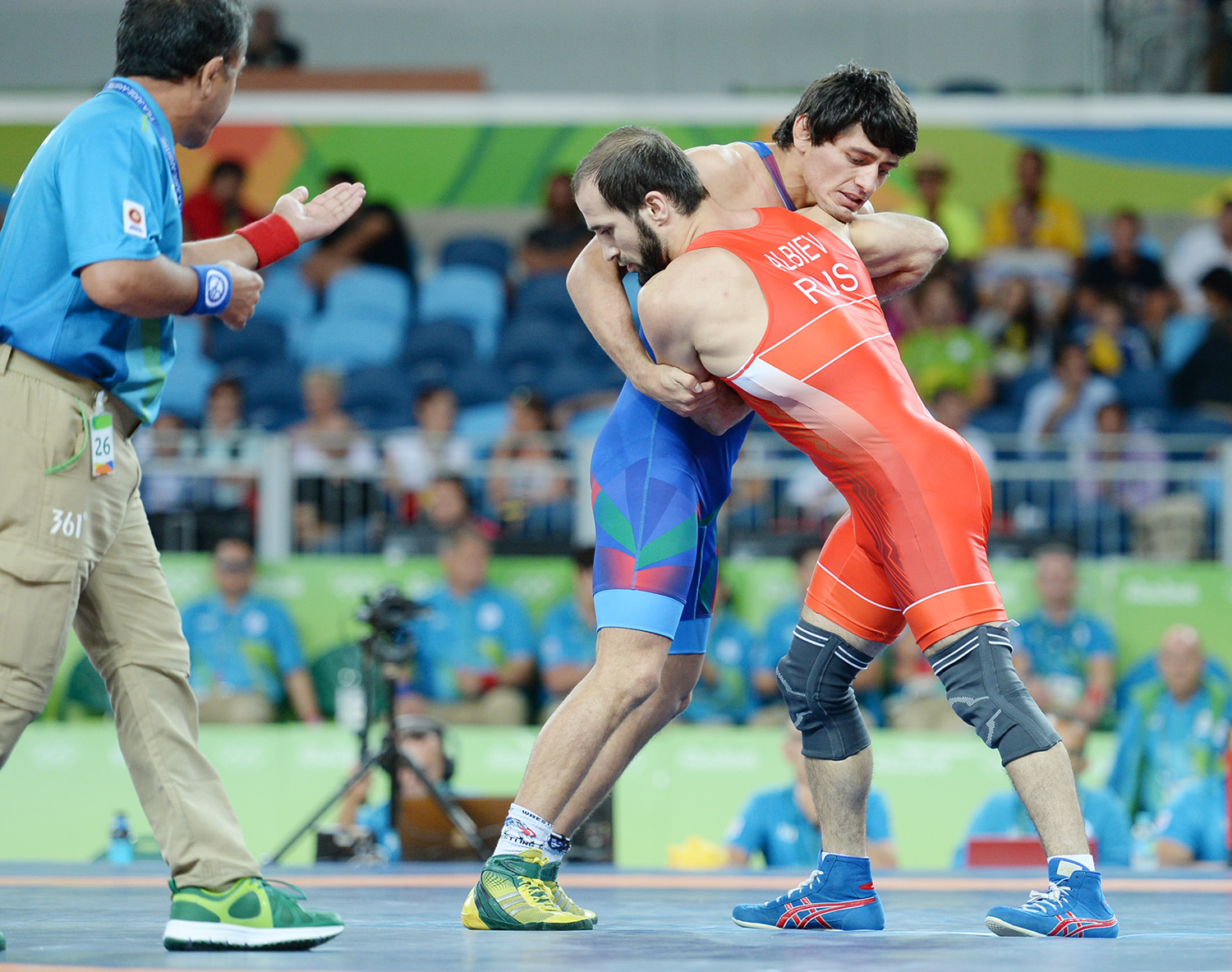
- Albiev (right) against Rasul Chunayev at the 2016 Olympics

Personal information
- Full name: Islambek Tsilimovich Albiev
- Nickname: The Professor mat
- Citizenship: (Russia) Russian
- Born: December 28, 1988 (age 37) Grozny, Chechen-Ingush ASSR
- Home town: Grozny; Moscow
- Height: 1.63 m (5 ft 4 in)
- Weight: 66 kg (146 lb)

Sport
- Country: Russia
- Sport: Wrestling
- Rank: Grand Master of Sports
- Event: Greco-Roman
- Club: CSKA Wrestling Club; Olympic Village-80
- Coached by: Umatgirey Tavbulatov
Medal record
Men's Greco-Roman wrestling
Representing Russia
Olympic Games
Gold medal – first place	2008 Beijing	60 kg
World Championships
Gold medal – first place	2009 Herning	60 kg
Silver medal – second place	2013 Budapest	66 kg
European Championship
Gold medal – first place	2009 Vilnius	60 kg
Gold medal – first place	2016 Riga	66 kg
Summer Universiade
Silver medal – second place	Kazan 2013	66 kg

Islambek Tsilimovich Albiev (Russian: Исламбек Цилимович Альбиев, Chechen: СаӀид-Цилиман кӀант Альбиев Ислам-Бека; born December 28, 1988, in Chechnya) is a Russian wrestler of Chechen descent, who won a gold medal at the 2008 Summer Olympics in Greco-Roman wrestling. Albiev is a World champion (2009) and two-time European champion (2009 and 2016).
