= Yana Rattigan =

Ukrainian born wrestler

Medal record

Representing Great Britain

Women's freestyle wrestling

European Championships
Silver medal – second place	2010 Baku	48 kg
Silver medal – second place	2013 Tbilisi	48 kg

World Combat Games
Silver medal – second place	2010 Beijing	48 kg

Representing England

Commonwealth Games
Silver medal – second place	2014 Glasgow	48 kg

Yana Rattigan (born Yana Stadnyk; 20 January 1987 in Lviv, Ukrainian SSR, USSR) is a Ukrainian born wrestler who competes internationally for Great Britain and England. She competed in the 2009 World Wrestling Championships finishing 5th in the 48 kg category and was 7th in the same weight category at the 2010 World Wrestling Championships. Her most notable performance came in the 2010 European Wrestling Championships where she won a silver medal, a feat repeated in 2013. She was the first woman to win a medal at European championship level for Britain. Representing England at the 2014 Commonwealth Games, she again won the silver medal.

== Personal life ==
Rattigan's brother is Olympic medallist Andriy Stadnik. Her sister-in-law Mariya Stadnik competes in the same weight category as Rattigan and was world champion in 2009. Rattigan married fellow wrestler Leon Rattigan in 2010, and began competing officially under her married name in 2014.
