= Neha Rathi =

Indian wrestler

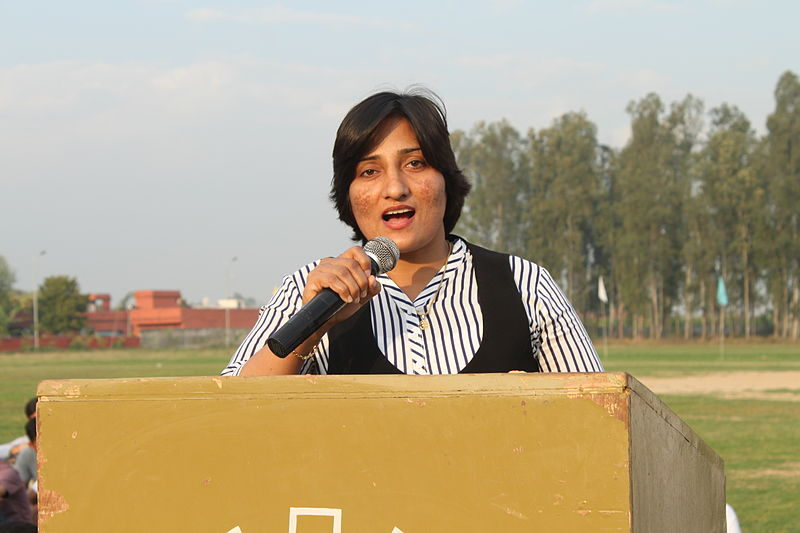
- Neha Rathi

Personal information
- Nationality: Indian
- Weight: 51 kg (112 lb)
Medal record
Arjuna award (2013)
Bhim Award (2005)
Bharat Kumari
Bharat kaiseni
Haryana Kumari

Neha Rathi is an Indian wrestler. She was born in Bhaproda village district Jhajjar, Haryana. She is the daughter of Arjuna award-winner Jagroop Singh Rathi. She participated in 10 senior National championships and represented India on the international circuit more than 35 times. She competed in the 51 kilograms (112 lb) weight category. She was given Arjuna award in 2013. Her sporting achievements include:

- Bronze medal in Asian Championship 2008 (South Korea)
