= Aleksander Mikaelyan =

Armenian Greco-Roman wrestler

Personal information
- Born: 9 October 1990 (age 35) Armenia
- Height: 1.74 m (5 ft 8 1/2 in)
- Weight: 65 kg (143 lb)

Sport
- Sport: Wrestling
- Event: Greco-Roman
- Coached by: Yura Karapetyan; Armen Balaryan
Medal record
Representing Armenia
Men's Greco-Roman wrestling
World Cup
Silver medal – second place	2013 Tehran	60 kg

Aleksander Mikaelyan (Armenian: Aleksander Միքայելյան, born 9 October 1990) is an Armenian Greco-Roman wrestler.

Mikaelyan was a member of the Armenian Greco-Roman wrestling team at the 2013 Wrestling World Cup. The Armenian team came in fourth place. Mikaelyan personally won a silver medal.
