= Anar Zeinalov =

Estonian wrestler

Anar Zeinalov (born 13 January 1985) is an Estonian wrestler.

He was born in Kohtla-Järve.

He began his wrestling career in 1994, coached by Georgi Esebua. Later his coach was Henn Põlluste. He is competed at World Wrestling Championships. He is 9-times Estonian champion. 2005–2013 he was a member of Estonian national wrestling team. Later he is lived and competed in Germany.
