= Kanybek Zholchubekov =

Kyrgyzstani Greco-Roman wrestler

Personal information
- Born: 8 October 1989 (age 36)

Sport
- Country: Kyrgyzstan
- Sport: Amateur wrestling
- Event: Greco-Roman
Medal record
Men's Greco-Roman wrestling
Representing Kyrgyzstan
Asian Games
Silver medal – second place	2010 Guangzhou	55 kg
Silver medal – second place	2018 Jakarta	60 kg
Islamic Solidarity Games
Gold medal – first place	2017 Baku	59 kg

Kanybek Zholchubekov (born 8 October 1989) is a Kyrgyzstani Greco-Roman wrestler. He won the silver medal in the men's 60 kg event at the 2018 Asian Games held in Jakarta, Indonesia.

In 2019, Zholchubekov competed in the 60 kg event at the World Wrestling Championships held in Nur-Sultan, Kazakhstan.

== Achievements ==
Year	Tournament	Location	Result	Event
2010	Asian Games	Guangzhou, China	2nd	Greco-Roman 55 kg
2017	Islamic Solidarity Games	Baku, Azerbaijan	1st	Greco-Roman 59 kg
2018	Asian Games	Jakarta, Indonesia	2nd	Greco-Roman 60 kg
