= Li Shujin =

Chinese Greco-Roman wrestler

Medal record

Men's Greco-Roman wrestling

Representing China

World Championships
Bronze medal – third place	2011 Istanbul	55 kg

Asian Games
Bronze medal – third place	2010 Guangzhou	55 kg

Li Shujin (born August 1, 1982) is a male wrestler from China. He competed at the 2012 Summer Olympics, finishing in 7th place.

== See also ==
- China at the 2012 Summer Olympics
