= Ivan Kuylakov =

Russian Greco-Roman wrestler

Ivan Nikolaevich Kuylakov
Personal information
- Native name: Иван Николаевич Куйлаков
- Nationality: Russia
- Born: February 22, 1986 (age 40)
- Weight: 59 kg (130 lb)

Sport
- Country: Russia
- Sport: Wrestling
- Rank: International Master of Sports
- Event: Greco-Roman
Medal record
Greco-Roman wrestling
Representing Russia
World Wrestling Championships
Silver medal – second place	2013 Budapest	60 kg
European Wrestling Championships
Silver medal – second place	2013 Tbilisi	60 kg
Bronze medal – third place	2014 Vantaa	59 kg
Summer Universiade
Gold medal – first place	2013 Kazan	60 kg
Golden Grand Prix Ivan Poddubny
Gold medal – first place	2009 Tyumen	60 kg
Gold medal – first place	2011 Tyumen	60 kg
Oleg Karavaev Memorial
Gold medal – first place	2015 Minsk	59 kg

Ivan Nikolaevich Kuylakov (Russian: Иван Николаевич Куйлаков, born February 22, 1986) is a Russian Greco-Roman wrestler. 2013 World Wrestling Championships runner-up.

He has won four bronze medals in the Russian wrestling championships (2007, 2010, 2011, 2012), and is a two-fold winner of the "Golden Grand Prix Ivan Poddubny" competition (2009, 2011). In 2013, he won a silver medal at the 2013 European Wrestling Championships. Silver Medalist 2013 World Wrestling Championships.
