= Davaasükhiin Otgontsetseg =

Mongolian freestyle wrestler (born 1990)

Medal record

Women's freestyle wrestling

Representing Mongolia

World Championships
Silver medal – second place	2011 Istanbul	51 kg
Bronze medal – third place	2016 Budapest	55 kg

Asian Championships
Gold medal – first place	2016 Bangkok	55 kg
Silver medal – second place	2011 Tashkent	51 kg
Bronze medal – third place	2009 Pattaya	51 kg

Golden Grand Prix Ivan Yarygin
Silver medal – second place	2017 Krasnoyarsk	53 kg

Davaasükhiin Otgontsetseg (born September 26, 1990, in Darkhan) is a freestyle wrestler from Mongolia. She won a World Championship silver medal in the -51 kg division in 2011, and a bronze in 2016 in the -55 kg division.

She competed at the 2012 Summer Olympics in the -48 kg division. She beat Carolina Castillo in the first round before losing to Iwona Matkowska.

In 2015, she competed in the women's freestyle 53 kg event at the 2015 World Wrestling Championships held in Las Vegas, United States.
