= Kamran Mammadov =

Azerbaijani Greco-Roman wrestler

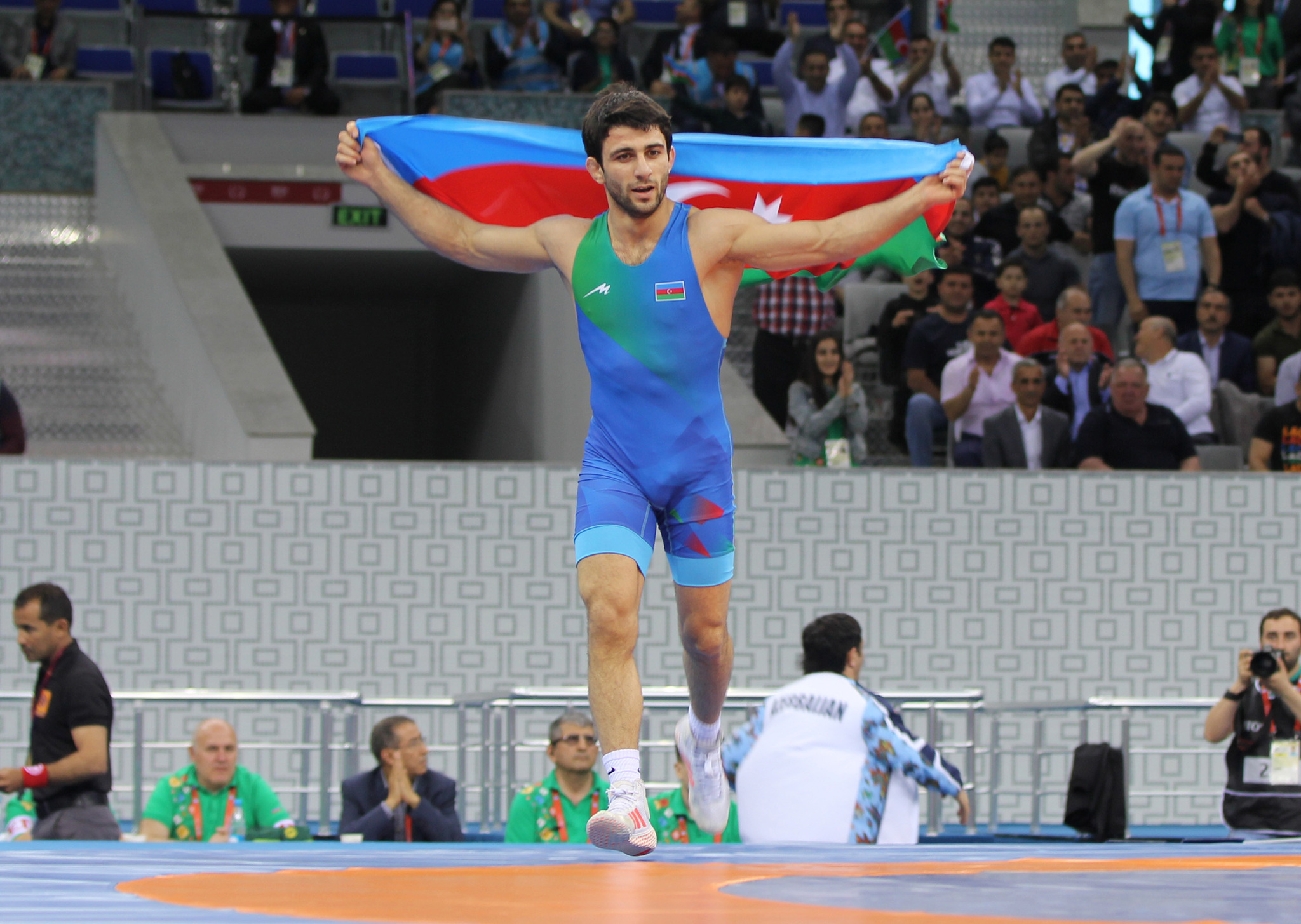

Medal record

Men's Greco-Roman wrestling

Representing Azerbaijan

European Championships
Bronze medal – third place	2013 Tbilisi	60 kg
Bronze medal – third place	2014 Vantaa	59 kg
Bronze medal – third place	2016 Riga	66 kg

Summer Universiade
Silver medal – second place	Kazan 2013	60 kg

Islamic Solidarity Games
Gold medal – first place	2017 Baku	66 kg

World Cup
Gold medal – first place	2015 Tehran	66 kg

Kamran Mammadov (Azerbaijani: Kamran Məmmədov, born 12 March 1990) is a Greco-Roman wrestler from Azerbaijan.

Mammadov won a bronze medal at the 2013 European Wrestling Championships in Tbilisi., in 2014 European Wrestling Championships and 2016 European Wrestling Championships.
