= 2013 European Wrestling Championships =

2013 European Championships
- Host city: (Georgia (country)) Tbilisi, Georgia
- Dates: 19–24 March
- Stadium: Tbilisi Sports Palace

Champions
- Freestyle: Russia
- Greco-Roman: Russia
- Women: Ukraine

The 2013 European Wrestling Championships were held in Tbilisi, Georgia, from 19 March to 24 March 2013.

== Medal table ==
Rank	Nation	Gold	Silver	Bronze	Total
1	Russia (RUS)	6	3	6	15
2	Ukraine (UKR)	2	3	6	11
3	Georgia (GEO)	2	2	3	7
4	Turkey (TUR)	2	1	4	7
5	Armenia (ARM)	2	1	2	5
5	Belarus (BLR)	2	1	2	5
7	Bulgaria (BUL)	1	2	3	6
8	Poland (POL)	1	2	0	3
9	Hungary (HUN)	1	1	1	3
10	Latvia (LAT)	1	0	0	1
10	Sweden (SWE)	1	0	0	1
12	Azerbaijan (AZE)	0	1	6	7
13	Great Britain (GBR)	0	1	0	1
13	Greece (GRE)	0	1	0	1
13	Israel (ISR)	0	1	0	1
13	Spain (ESP)	0	1	0	1
17	Germany (GER)	0	0	3	3
18	Croatia (CRO)	0	0	2	2
18	France (FRA)	0	0	2	2
20	Finland (FIN)	0	0	1	1
20	Slovakia (SVK)	0	0	1	1
Totals (21 entries)		21	21	42	84

== Team ranking ==
Rank	Men's freestyle		Men's Greco-Roman		Women's freestyle	
Rank	Team	Points	Team	Points	Team	Points
1	Russia	52	Russia	51	Ukraine	52
2	Georgia	43	Bulgaria	45	Russia	48
3	Ukraine	41	Georgia	40	Poland	43
4	Turkey	33	Azerbaijan	37	Germany	31
5	Bulgaria	33	Turkey	36	Bulgaria	24
6	Armenia	29	Armenia	31	Azerbaijan	23
7	Azerbaijan	27	Belarus	28	Turkey	23
8	Belarus	24	Ukraine	24	Belarus	21
9	Moldova	21	France	17	Romania	?
10	Germany	19	Germany	17	Spain	15

== Medal summary ==
=== Men's freestyle ===
Event	Gold	Silver	Bronze
55 kg	Giorgi Edisherashvili; Georgia	Uladzislau Andreyeu; Belarus	Sezar Akgül; Turkey
55 kg	Giorgi Edisherashvili; Georgia	Uladzislau Andreyeu; Belarus	Yashar Aliyev; Azerbaijan
60 kg	Opan Sat; Russia	Vladimir Dubov; Bulgaria	Vladimer Khinchegashvili; Georgia
60 kg	Opan Sat; Russia	Vladimir Dubov; Bulgaria	Tim Schleicher; Germany
66 kg	David Safaryan; Armenia	Yakup Gör; Turkey	Aleksandr Kontoev; Belarus
66 kg	David Safaryan; Armenia	Yakup Gör; Turkey	Ilyas Bekbulatov; Russia
74 kg	Aniuar Geduev; Russia	Gábor Hatos; Hungary	Giya Chykhladze; Ukraine
74 kg	Aniuar Geduev; Russia	Gábor Hatos; Hungary	Leonid Bazan; Bulgaria
84 kg	Dato Marsagishvili; Georgia	Musa Murtazaliev; Armenia	Ibragim Aldatov; Ukraine
84 kg	Dato Marsagishvili; Georgia	Musa Murtazaliev; Armenia	Anzor Urishev; Russia
96 kg	Pavlo Oliinyk; Ukraine	Kamil Skaskiewicz; Poland	Lyuben Iliev; Bulgaria
96 kg	Pavlo Oliinyk; Ukraine	Kamil Skaskiewicz; Poland	Vladislav Baitcaev; Russia
120 kg	Taha Akgül; Turkey	Alen Zasyeyev; Ukraine	Jamaladdin Magomedov; Azerbaijan
120 kg	Taha Akgül; Turkey	Alen Zasyeyev; Ukraine	Geno Petriashvili; Georgia

=== Men's Greco-Roman ===
Event	Gold	Silver	Bronze
55 kg	Elbek Tazhyieu; Belarus	Elchin Aliyev; Azerbaijan	Bekkhan Mankiev; Russia
55 kg	Elbek Tazhyieu; Belarus	Elchin Aliyev; Azerbaijan	Fatih Üçüncü; Turkey
60 kg	Ivo Angelov; Bulgaria	Ivan Kuylakov; Russia	Kamran Mammadov; Azerbaijan
60 kg	Ivo Angelov; Bulgaria	Ivan Kuylakov; Russia	István Lévai; Slovakia
66 kg	Tamás Lőrincz; Hungary	Adam Kurak; Russia	Artak Margaryan; France
66 kg	Tamás Lőrincz; Hungary	Adam Kurak; Russia	Hasan Aliyev; Azerbaijan
74 kg	Roman Vlasov; Russia	Zurabi Datunashvili; Georgia	Bozo Starcevic; Croatia
74 kg	Roman Vlasov; Russia	Zurabi Datunashvili; Georgia	Yavor Yanakiev; Bulgaria
84 kg	Aleksey Mishin; Russia	Vladimer Gegeshidze; Georgia	Artur Shahinyan; Armenia
84 kg	Aleksey Mishin; Russia	Vladimer Gegeshidze; Georgia	Nenad Zugaj; Croatia
96 kg	Artur Aleksanyan; Armenia	Vladislav Metodiev; Bulgaria	Mélonin Noumonvi; France
96 kg	Artur Aleksanyan; Armenia	Vladislav Metodiev; Bulgaria	Cenk İldem; Turkey
120 kg	Rıza Kayaalp; Turkey	Yevhenii Orlov; Ukraine	Vachik Yeghiazaryan; Armenia
120 kg	Rıza Kayaalp; Turkey	Yevhenii Orlov; Ukraine	Guram Pherselidze; Georgia

=== Women's freestyle ===
Event	Gold	Silver	Bronze
48 kg	Valeriya Chepsarakova; Russia	Yana Stadnik; Great Britain	Jacqueline Schellin; Germany
48 kg	Valeriya Chepsarakova; Russia	Yana Stadnik; Great Britain	Patimat Bagomedova; Azerbaijan
51 kg	Roksana Zasina; Poland	*Yuliya Blahinya; Ukraine	Ekaterina Krasnova; Russia
51 kg	Roksana Zasina; Poland	*Yuliya Blahinya; Ukraine	*Tiina Ylinen; Finland
55 kg	Sofia Mattsson; Sweden	Maria Prevolaraki; Greece	Iryna Husyak; Ukraine
55 kg	Sofia Mattsson; Sweden	Maria Prevolaraki; Greece	Emese Barka; Hungary
59 kg	Anastasiya Huchok; Belarus	Zhargalma Tsyrenova; Russia	Tetyana Lavrenchuk; Ukraine
59 kg	Anastasiya Huchok; Belarus	Zhargalma Tsyrenova; Russia	Hafize Şahin; Turkey
63 kg	Anastasija Grigorjeva; Latvia	Monika Michalik; Poland	Hanna Beliayeva; Azerbaijan
63 kg	Anastasija Grigorjeva; Latvia	Monika Michalik; Poland	Ganna Vasylenko; Ukraine
67 kg	Alina Stadnik; Ukraine	Ilana Kratysh; Israel	Aline Focken; Germany
67 kg	Alina Stadnik; Ukraine	Ilana Kratysh; Israel	Svetlana Babushkina; Russia
72 kg	Natalia Vorobieva; Russia	Maider Unda; Spain	Vasilisa Marzaliuk; Belarus
72 kg	Natalia Vorobieva; Russia	Maider Unda; Spain	Kateryna Burmistrova; Ukraine

(*) Romanian original silver medallist Estera Dobre was disqualified after her doping sample had been tested positive in August 2013.

== Participating nations ==
390 competitors from 36 nations participated.

- Albania (2)
- Armenia (14)
- Austria (11)
- Azerbaijan (21)
- Belarus (21)
- Bulgaria (20)
- Croatia (5)
- Czech Republic (8)
- Denmark (2)
- Spain (8)
- Estonia (6)
- Finland (7)
- France (3)
- United Kingdom (1)
- Georgia (14)
- Germany (21)
- Greece (12)
- Hungary (21)
- Israel (6)
- Italy (13)
- Latvia (6)
- Lithuania (6)
- Moldova (14)
- North Macedonia (2)
- Montenegro (2)
- Norway (5)
- Poland (13)
- Portugal (4)
- Romania (17)
- Russia (21)
- Serbia (6)
- Switzerland (3)
- Slovakia (9)
- Sweden (10)
- Turkey (21)
- Ukraine (21)
