= Sümeyya Sezer Zeybek =

Turkish female freestyle wrestler

Sümeyye Sezer Zeybek
Personal information
- Born: 2 April 1991 (age 35)
- Height: 1.55 m (5 ft 1 in)
- Weight: 48 kg (106 lb)

Sport
- Country: Turkey
- Sport: Wrestling
- Event: Freestyle wrestling
- Club: Türk Telekom; Antalya

Sümeyye Sezer Zeybek (born 2 April 1991) is a Turkish female freestyle wrestler who has competed in the 48 kg division.
