= Hamid Sourian =

Iranian Greco-Roman wrestler

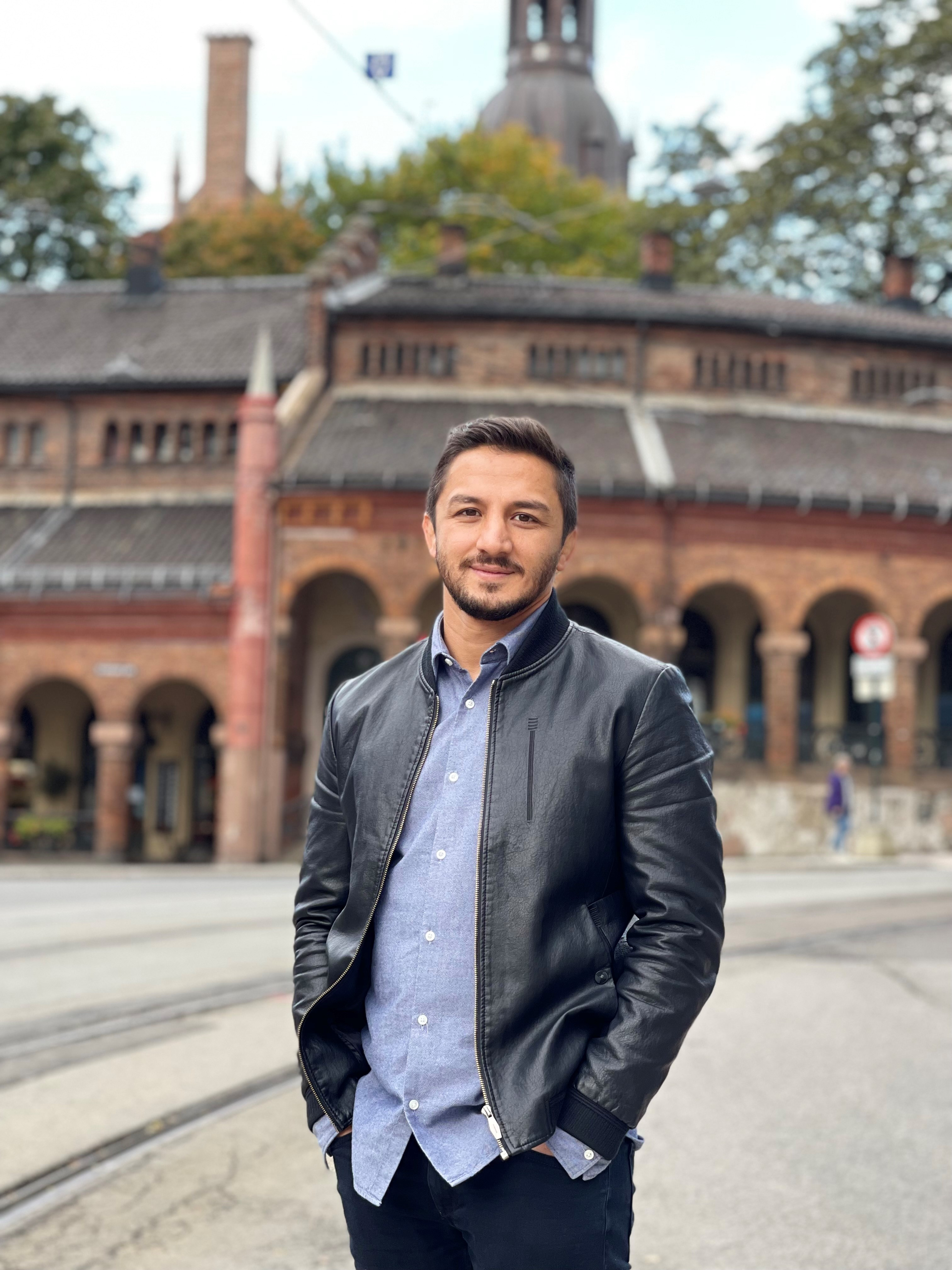
- Sourian in July 2022

Personal information
- Native name: حمید سوریان ‌
- Full name: Hamid Sourian Reihanpour
- Nickname: 7 Star General
- Nationality: Iranian
- Born: 24 August 1985 (age 41) Rey, Iran
- Height: 1.69 m (5 ft 7 in)

Sport
- Country: Iran
- Sport: Wrestling
- Event: Greco-Roman
- Club: Babak Rey Club
- Coached by: Abdollah Zare
Medal record
Representing Iran
Men's Greco-Roman wrestling
Event	1st	2nd	3rd
Olympic Games	1	0	0
World Championships	6	0	0
World Junior Championship	1	0	0
World Cup	1	1	0
Other	6	1	2
Total	15	2	2
Men's Greco-Roman wrestling
Representing Iran
Olympic Games
Gold medal – first place	2012 London	55 kg
World Championships
Gold medal – first place	2005 Budapest	55 kg
Gold medal – first place	2006 Guangzhou	55 kg
Gold medal – first place	2007 Baku	55 kg
Gold medal – first place	2009 Herning	55 kg
Gold medal – first place	2010 Moscow	55 kg
Gold medal – first place	2014 Tashkent	59 kg
Grand Prix
Gold medal – first place	2014 Szombathely	59 kg
Gold medal – first place	2014 Gdansk	66 kg
Gold medal – first place	2010 Tbilisi	60 kg
Bronze medal – third place	2007 Sofia	55 kg
Bronze medal – third place	2006 Baku	55 kg
World Junior Championship
Gold medal – first place	2005 Vilnius	55 kg
Asian Championships
Gold medal – first place	2007 Bishkek	55 kg
Gold medal – first place	2008 Jeju Island	55 kg
Asian Junior Championship
Gold medal – first place	2005 Jeju Island	55 kg
Silver medal – second place	2004 Almaty	55 kg

Hamid Sourian Reihanpour (Persian: حمید سوریان ریحان‌پور; born 24 August 1985) or Hamid Soryan is an Iranian retired wrestler. Sourian is 2012 Summer Olympic games gold medalist and six-time World Champion. He won both the Junior World Championships and Senior World Championships in 2005. He is also 2007 and 2008 Asian championships gold medalist.

== Summer Olympics 2008 ==
Sourian was a strong favorite to win the gold medal at 55 kg in the 2008 Beijing Olympics, but was upset in the quarterfinals by eventual gold medalist Nazyr Mankiev of Russia. Sourian was defeated in the bronze medal match by South Korea's Park Eun-Chul, Sourian had beaten Park in two different world championship finals prior to this Bronze medal match. In both his losses, he lost on tie-breaker criteria.

== Summer Olympics 2012 ==
On 5 August 2012, he won his country's first ever gold medal in Greco-Roman wrestling, defeating Azerbaijan's Rovshan Bayramov in the 55 kg final.

== Summer Olympics 2016 ==
After failing to qualify for the World Championship games and Continental Qualifier, on 3 May 2016 Sourian entered the second of the two worldwide qualification tournaments for the 2016 Summer Olympics in Turkey after failing to overcome Ivo Angelov from Bulgaria in Mongolia.

On May 5, Aleksandr Karelin posted a photo of Sourian on his Instagram page, wishing him success by writing: "You are the best and I wish you the best in the last 2016 Olympic Qualification Tournament. Believe you can and you will."

On May 7, Sourian finished first in the tournament and secured his ticket for Rio.

On the 14th of August, he was defeated by Shinobu Ota from Japan in the round of 32. Although leading by 4–0 in the first half of the bout, his energy quickly depleted in the second half and he was defeated by 5–6 in the end. His next match was against Almat Kebispayev from Kazakhstan in the repechage round. Again he was comfortably in the lead by 7–0 in the first half and then only needed one point for victory in the second, but his energy levels dropped towards the end and he lost the bout. This was his last appearance in Rio and his tournament was brought to a surprising end.

== International competition record ==
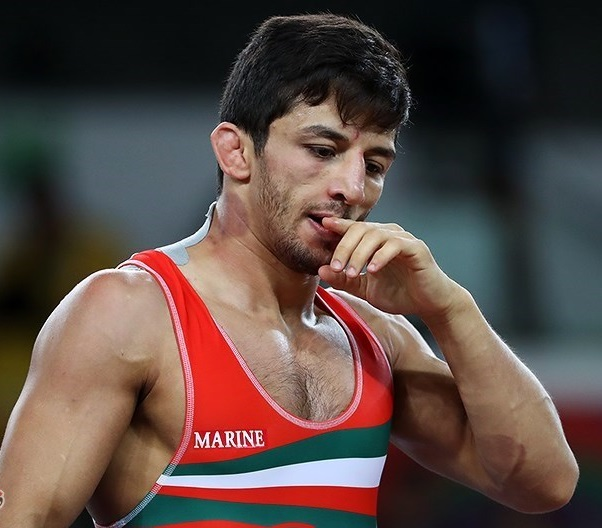
Sourian during 2016 Summer Olympics in Rio de Janeiro

Result	Round	Opponent	Score
2005 World Championship / (Hungary) Budapest / (gold) Gold medal / 55 kg
Win	Round of 32	Vugar Rahimov (UKR)	2–0 (4–3, 2–1)
Win	Round of 16	Bayram Özdemir (TUR)	2–0 (4–0, 3–2)
Win	Quarterfinals	Lázaro Rivas (CUB)	2–0 (2–1, 7–1)
Win	Semifinals	Yermek Kuketov (KAZ)	DSQ (3–0, 5–0)
Win	Final	Park Eun-chul (KOR)	2–0 (2–1, 4–3)
2006 World Championship / (China) Guangzhou / (gold) Gold medal / 55 kg
Win	Round of 32	Vicente Lillo (ESP)	2–0 (6–0, 7–0)
Win	Round of 16	Vugar Rahimov (UKR)	2–0 (7–2, 2–1)
Win	Quarterfinals	Venelin Venkov (BUL)	2–0 (8–2, 4–0)
Win	Semifinals	Lindsey Durlacher (USA)	2–0 (5–3, 3–2)
Win	Final	Rovshan Bayramov (AZE)	2–0 (3–0, 3–0)
2007 World Championship / (Azerbaijan) Baku / (gold) Gold medal / 55 kg
Win	Round of 64	Shane Parker (AUS)	2–0 (5–0, 8–1)
Win	Round of 32	Anders Nyblom (DEN)	2–0 (2–1, 4–0)
Win	Round of 16	Lindsey Durlacher (USA)	DSQ (4–0, 6–0)
Win	Quarterfinals	Virgil Munteanu (ROU)	2–0 (4–3, 2–2)
Win	Semifinals	Kristijan Fris (SRB)	2–0 (3–0, 1–1)
Win	Final	Park Eun-chul (KOR)	DSQ (1–1, 3–0, 4–0)
2008 Summer Olympics / (China) Beijing / 5th place / 55 kg
Win	Round of 32	Venelin Venkov (BUL)	Fall (4–0)
Win	Round of 16	Elgin Loren Elwais (PLW)	2–0 (8–0, 6–0)
Loss	Quarterfinals	Nazyr Mankiev (RUS)	1–2 (2–2, 1–1, 1–1)
Win	Repechage	Kristijan Fris (SRB)	2–0 (5–0, 1–1)
Loss	Bronze medal match	Park Eun-chul (KOR)	0–2 (1–1, 2–2)
2009 World Championship / (Denmark) Herning / (gold) Gold medal / 55 kg
Win	Round of 32	Joaquín Martínez (ESP)	2–0 (7–0, 3–0)
Win	Round of 16	Spenser Mango (USA)	2–0 (1–0, 6–0)
Win	Quarterfinals	Erhan Karakuş (TUR)	2–0 (1–0, 1–0)
Win	Semifinals	Håkan Nyblom (DEN)	2–0 (1–0, 6–0)
Win	Final	Roman Amoyan (ARM)	2–0 (5–0, 1–0)
2010 World Championship / (Russia) Moscow / (gold) Gold medal / 55 kg
Win	Round of 32	Mohammed Bouterfessa (ALG)	2–0 (5–0, 1–0)
Win	Round of 16	Venelin Venkov (BUL)	2–0 (2–0, 2–2)
Win	Quarterfinals	Jani Haapamäki (FIN)	2–0 (2–0, 1–1)
Win	Semifinals	Roman Amoyan (ARM)	2–0 (1–0, 2–0)
Win	Final	Choi Gyu-jin (KOR)	2–1 (4–0, 0–3, 1–0)
2012 Summer Olympics / (United Kingdom) London / (gold) Gold medal / 55 kg
Win	Round of 16	Arsen Eraliev (KGZ)	2–1 (4–0, 0–2, 2–1)
Win	Quarterfinals	Péter Módos (HUN)	2–0 (2–0, 1–0)
Win	Semifinals	Håkan Nyblom (DEN)	2–0 (3–0, 3–0)
Win	Final	Rovshan Bayramov (AZE)	2–0 (2–0, 1–0)
2014 World Championship / (Uzbekistan) Tashkent / (gold) Gold medal / 59 kg
Win	Round of 64	Alex Anechitei (ROU)	8–0
Win	Round of 32	Haithem Mahmoud (EGY)	2–1
Win	Round of 16	Ismael Borrero (CUB)	5–0
Win	Quarterfinals	Taleh Mammadov (AZE)	3–0
Win	Semifinals	Elmurat Tasmuradov (UZB)	2–1
Win	Final	Mingiyan Semenov (RUS)	2–1
2015 World Championship / (United States) Las Vegas / 7th place / 59 kg
Win	Round of 32	Raiber Rodríguez (VEN)	8–0
Win	Round of 16	Jani Haapamäki (FIN)	5–0, Fall
Loss	Quarterfinals	Rovshan Bayramov (AZE)	0–2, DSQ
Loss	Repechage	Yun Won-chol (PRK)	5–6
2016 Summer Olympics / (Brazil) Rio de Janeiro / 11th place / 59 kg
Loss	Round of 32	Shinobu Ota (JPN)	4–5
Loss	Repechage	Almat Kebispayev (KAZ)	7–6, Fall

== See also ==
- List of World and Olympic Champions in Greco-Roman wrestling § Individual Multiple-Time World Level Champions

Awards
Preceded by Morad Mohammadi; Ehsan Haddadi	Iran Sportsperson of the year 2007	Succeeded by Vacant
