= 2007 World Wrestling Championships – Men's Greco-Roman 55 kg =

Men's Greco-Roman 55 kg at the 2007 World Championships
- Venue: Heydar Aliyev Sports and Concert Complex
- Dates: 17 September 2007
- Competitors: 41 from 41 nations

Medalists
gold medal	Hamid Sourian	Iran
silver medal	Park Eun-chul	South Korea
bronze medal	Nazyr Mankiev	Russia
bronze medal	Kristijan Fris	Serbia

The men's Greco-Roman 55 kilograms is a competition featured at the 2007 World Wrestling Championships, and was held at the Heydar Aliyev Sports and Concert Complex in Baku, Azerbaijan on 17 September 2007.

== Results ==
Legend

- C — Won by 3 cautions given to the opponent
- F — Won by fall
- WO — Won by walkover

=== Finals ===
Semifinals			Final
Park Eun-chul (KOR)	4	7
Ildar Hafizov (UZB)	1	0	Park Eun-chul (KOR)	1	0	0
Kristijan Fris (SRB)	0	1	Hamid Sourian (IRI)	1	3	4^{C}
Hamid Sourian (IRI)	3	1

=== Top half ===
==== Section 1 ====
Round of 64

Round of 32
Denver Jansen (RSA)	0	0
Maher Bouthouri (TUN)	7	7
Nazyr Mankiev (RUS)	4	2	1
Park Eun-chul (KOR)	0	3	1
Rovshan Bayramov (AZE)	1	2	3
Roman Amoyan (ARM)	3	1	3
Artiom Kiouregkian (GRE)	0	0
Jiao Huafeng (CHN)	4	3

Round of 16
Maher Bouthouri (TUN)	0	0
Park Eun-chul (KOR)	6	4^{F}
Rovshan Bayramov (AZE)	7	7
Jiao Huafeng (CHN)	0	0

Quarterfinals
Park Eun-chul (KOR)	3	3
Rovshan Bayramov (AZE)	0	0

==== Section 2 ====
Round of 64

Round of 32
Ildar Hafizov (UZB)	5	1	2
Haşim Baykara (TUR)	0	1	0
Elgin Loren Elwais (PLW)	0	0
Tibor Oláh (HUN)	6	7
Julio Muñoz (COL)	0	2
Joaquín Martínez (ESP)	2	4
Thomas Wild (SUI)	0	0
Ulan Temirbekov (KGZ)	2	2

Round of 16
Ildar Hafizov (UZB)	1	6	2
Tibor Oláh (HUN)	2	0	1
Joaquín Martínez (ESP)	0	0
Ulan Temirbekov (KGZ)	6	7

Quarterfinals
Ildar Hafizov (UZB)	3	1
Ulan Temirbekov (KGZ)	2	1

=== Bottom half ===
==== Section 3 ====
Round of 64
Oleg Lavruvjanec (LTU)	2	3
Promise Mwenga (CAN)	0	0

Round of 32
Ville Käki (FIN)	1	1
Florian Crusius (GER)	4	1
Kim Won-mo (PRK)	0	0
Kristijan Fris (SRB)	3	3
Mechman Alaev (ISR)	7	6
Alberto Medina (POR)	0	0
Yerbol Konyratov (KAZ)	W	O
Oleg Lavruvjanec (LTU)

Round of 16
Florian Crusius (GER)	0	0
Kristijan Fris (SRB)	2	5
Mechman Alaev (ISR)	0	0
Yerbol Konyratov (KAZ)	6	2

Quarterfinals
Kristijan Fris (SRB)	2	1	1
Yerbol Konyratov (KAZ)	3	1	1

==== Section 4 ====
Round of 64
Yagnier Hernández (CUB)	7	4
Kanhaiya Lal Yadav (IND)	0	0
Masatoshi Toyota (JPN)	6	1	4
Paweł Kramarz (POL)	2	1	0
Mamuka Khozrevanidze (GEO)	1	0
Vugar Rahimov (UKR)	1	2
Jan Hocko (CZE)	1	0
Virgil Munteanu (ROU)	1	5
Anders Nyblom (DEN)	4	1
Venelin Venkov (BUL)	0	1
Shane Parker (AUS)	0	1
Hamid Sourian (IRI)	5	8
Lindsey Durlacher (USA)	4	1	5
Thomas Rønningen (NOR)	1	1	0
Maksim Kazharski (BLR)	5	3	3
Roberto Pira (ITA)	3	4	7

Round of 32
Yagnier Hernández (CUB)	2	1	5
Masatoshi Toyota (JPN)	2	1	1
Vugar Rahimov (UKR)	0	0
Virgil Munteanu (ROU)	5	5
Anders Nyblom (DEN)	1	0
Hamid Sourian (IRI)	2	4
Lindsey Durlacher (USA)	6	6
Roberto Pira (ITA)	0	0

Round of 16
Yagnier Hernández (CUB)	2	1	0
Virgil Munteanu (ROU)	0	1	3
Hamid Sourian (IRI)	4	6^{C}
Lindsey Durlacher (USA)	0	0

Quarterfinals
Virgil Munteanu (ROU)	3	2
Hamid Sourian (IRI)	4	2

=== Repechage ===
Repechage round 1
Shane Parker (AUS)	0	0
Anders Nyblom (DEN)	7	7^{F}

Repechage round 2
Nazyr Mankiev (RUS)	3	3
Maher Bouthouri (TUN)	1	1
Anders Nyblom (DEN)	1	1
Lindsey Durlacher (USA)	1	2

Repechage round 3
Nazyr Mankiev (RUS)	6	1	3
Rovshan Bayramov (AZE)	0	3	0
Lindsey Durlacher (USA)	1	1	1
Virgil Munteanu (ROU)	1	2	1

Bronze medals
Nazyr Mankiev (RUS)	6	2
Ildar Hafizov (UZB)	0	1
Lindsey Durlacher (USA)	0	0
Kristijan Fris (SRB)	2	3
