= 2005 World Wrestling Championships – Men's Greco-Roman 55 kg =

Men's Greco-Roman 55 kg at the 2005 World Championships
- Venue: László Papp Budapest Sports Arena
- Dates: 30 September 2005
- Competitors: 35 from 35 nations

Medalists
gold medal	Hamid Sourian	Iran
silver medal	Park Eun-chul	South Korea
bronze medal	István Majoros	Hungary
bronze medal	Yermek Kuketov	Kazakhstan

The men's Greco-Roman 55 kilograms is a competition featured at the 2005 World Wrestling Championships, and was held at the László Papp Budapest Sports Arena in Budapest, Hungary on 30 September 2005.

== Results ==
Legend

- C — Won by 3 cautions given to the opponent
- F — Won by fall

=== Finals ===
Semifinals				Final
Park Eun-chul (KOR)	0	1	3
István Majoros (HUN)	3	1	0	Park Eun-chul (KOR)	1	3
Yermek Kuketov (KAZ)	0	0		Hamid Sourian (IRI)	2	4
Hamid Sourian (IRI)	3	5^{C}

=== Top half ===
==== Section 1 ====
Round of 64

Round of 32
Venelin Venkov (BUL)	3	0
Cha Kwang-su (PRK)	3	6
Dariusz Jabłoński (POL)	3	1^{C}
Jan Hocko (CZE)	0	3
Aliaksei Shaipak (BLR)	0	1
Park Eun-chul (KOR)	5	1
Anders Nyblom (DEN)	2	1
Jani Haapamäki (FIN)	1	1

Round of 16
Cha Kwang-su (PRK)	6	0	3
Dariusz Jabłoński (POL)	4	2	2
Park Eun-chul (KOR)	4	0	3
Anders Nyblom (DEN)	2	3	0

Quarterfinals
Cha Kwang-su (PRK)	0	0
Park Eun-chul (KOR)	6	4

==== Section 2 ====
Round of 64

Round of 32
Roberto Pira (ITA)	2	1
Lindsey Durlacher (USA)	3	6
István Majoros (HUN)	4	2
Anders Rønningen (NOR)	0	0
Stepan Dubov (ISR)	3	0	0
Svajūnas Adomaitis (LTU)	2	2	6^{C}
Rovshan Bayramov (AZE)	1	3	5
Sergej Skripka (GER)	1	1	0

Round of 16
Lindsey Durlacher (USA)	0	1
István Majoros (HUN)	5	1
Svajūnas Adomaitis (LTU)	0	0
Rovshan Bayramov (AZE)	5	1^{C}

Quarterfinals
István Majoros (HUN)	2	2
Rovshan Bayramov (AZE)	0	1

=== Bottom half ===
==== Section 3 ====
Round of 64

Round of 32
Artiom Kiouregkian (GRE)	0	0
Yermek Kuketov (KAZ)	4	2
Geidar Mamedaliyev (RUS)	0	3	0
Uran Kalilov (KGZ)	6	3	3^{C}
Elgin Loren Elwais (PLW)	1	0
Roman Amoyan (ARM)	7	7
Kristijan Fris (SCG)	5	2	5
Jansel Ramírez (DOM)	0	2	0

Round of 16
Yermek Kuketov (KAZ)	1	3
Uran Kalilov (KGZ)	1	2
Roman Amoyan (ARM)	6	5
Kristijan Fris (SCG)	0	0

Quarterfinals
Yermek Kuketov (KAZ)	4	3	2
Roman Amoyan (ARM)	6	1	0

==== Section 4 ====
Round of 64
Irakli Chochua (GEO)	9	7^{F}
Julio Maldonado (GUA)	0	0
Florin Gavrilă (ROM)	0	3
Lázaro Rivas (CUB)	4	5
Jiao Huafeng (CHN)	1	2	0
Masatoshi Toyota (JPN)	1	11	5

Round of 32
Akbar Kuziev (UZB)	1	2
Bayram Özdemir (TUR)	3	5
Vugar Rahimov (UKR)	3	1
Hamid Sourian (IRI)	4	2
Ajay Kumar (IND)	0	0
Irakli Chochua (GEO)	9	7
Lázaro Rivas (CUB)	4	0	7^{C}
Masatoshi Toyota (JPN)	1	5	0

Round of 16
Bayram Özdemir (TUR)	0	2
Hamid Sourian (IRI)	4	3
Irakli Chochua (GEO)	0	1
Lázaro Rivas (CUB)	3	3^{C}

Quarterfinals
Hamid Sourian (IRI)	2	7
Lázaro Rivas (CUB)	1	1

=== Repechage ===
Repechage round 2
Aliaksei Shaipak (BLR)	5	2	0
Anders Nyblom (DEN)	5	1	4^{C}
Vugar Rahimov (UKR)	6	9
Bayram Özdemir (TUR)	1	1

Repechage round 3
Anders Nyblom (DEN)	4^{C}
Cha Kwang-su (PRK)	0
Vugar Rahimov (UKR)	1	1
Lázaro Rivas (CUB)	2	5

Bronze medals
Anders Nyblom (DEN)	0	1
István Majoros (HUN)	5	4
Lázaro Rivas (CUB)	0
Yermek Kuketov (KAZ)	3^{F}
