= 2006 World Wrestling Championships – Men's Greco-Roman 55 kg =

Men's Greco-Roman 55 kg at the 2006 World Championships
- Venue: Tianhe Gymnasium
- Dates: 25 September 2006
- Competitors: 32 from 32 nations

Medalists
| gold medal | Hamid Sourian | Iran |
| silver medal | Rovshan Bayramov | Azerbaijan |
| bronze medal | Lindsey Durlacher | United States |
| bronze medal | Park Eun-chul | South Korea |

The men's Greco-Roman 55 kilograms is a competition featured at the 2006 World Wrestling Championships, and was held at the Tianhe Gymnasium in Guangzhou, China on 25 September 2006.

This Greco-Roman wrestling competition consists of a single-elimination tournament, with a repechage used to determine the winner of two bronze medals.

== Results ==
Legend

- C — Won by 3 cautions given to the opponent
- WO — Won by walkover

=== Final ===
| Final |
| Hamid Sourian (IRI) | 3 | 3 |
| Rovshan Bayramov (AZE) | 0 | 0 |

=== Top half ===
Round of 32
Yagnier Hernández (CUB) | 0 | 1 | 2
Masatoshi Toyota (JPN) | 4 | 1 | 1
Lindsey Durlacher (USA) | 7 | 1 | 3
Jiao Huafeng (CHN) | 4 | 2 | 0
Aliaksandr Shalesny (BLR) | 4 | 6^{C}
Sherali Shodmanov (UZB) | 6 | 3
Anders Nyblom (DEN) | 6 | 7
Juan Cortés (MEX) | 0 | 0
Venelin Venkov (BUL) | 8 | 8
Elgin Loren Elwais (PLW) | 0 | 2
Thomas Rønningen (NOR) | 1 | 0 | 3
Jorge Cardozo (VEN) | 1 | 6 | 5
Vugar Rahimov (UKR) | 1 | 6
Bayram Özdemir (TUR) | 1 | 0
Hamid Sourian (IRI) | 6 | 7
Vicente Lillo (ESP) | 0 | 0

Round of 16
Yagnier Hernández (CUB) | 3 | 0 | 0
Lindsey Durlacher (USA) | 2 | 2 | 6
Aliaksandr Shalesny (BLR) | 4 | 0 | 2
Anders Nyblom (DEN) | 1 | 7 | 4
Venelin Venkov (BUL) | 2 | 5
Jorge Cardozo (VEN) | 0 | 0
Vugar Rahimov (UKR) | 2 | 1
Hamid Sourian (IRI) | 7 | 2

Quarterfinals
Lindsey Durlacher (USA) | 4 | 2
Anders Nyblom (DEN) | 0 | 0
Venelin Venkov (BUL) | 2 | 0
Hamid Sourian (IRI) | 8 | 4

Semifinals
Lindsey Durlacher (USA) | 3 | 2
Hamid Sourian (IRI) | 5 | 3

=== Bottom half ===
Round of 32
Kristijan Fris (SCG) | 3 | 5
Karim Ibrahim El-Sayed (EGY) | 1 | 0
Ri Kyong-il (PRK) | 3 | 7
Margarito Angana (PHI) | 0 | 2
Park Eun-chul (KOR) | 3 | 6
Viktor Korablev (RUS) | 0 | 0
Nguyễn Văn Phương (VIE) | 0 | 0
Roman Amoyan (ARM) | 7 | 8
Irakli Chochua (GEO) | 5 | 1 | 6
Artiom Kiouregkian (GRE) | 0 | 1 | 0
Jani Haapamäki (FIN) | 5 | 0 | 0
Yerbol Konyratov (KAZ) | 0 | 3 | 3
Tibor Oláh (HUN) | 5 | 3 | 0
Rovshan Bayramov (AZE) | 2 | 4 | 7
Mukesh Khatri (IND) | 7 | 5
Rinat Usupjanov (KGZ) | 8 | 6

Round of 16
Kristijan Fris (SCG) | 4 | 2 | 1
Ri Kyong-il (PRK) | 0 | 3 | 1
Park Eun-chul (KOR) | 10 | 0 | 3
Roman Amoyan (ARM) | 2 | 4 | 2
Irakli Chochua (GEO) | 0 | 0
Yerbol Konyratov (KAZ) | 3 | 3
Rovshan Bayramov (AZE) | 7 | 9
Rinat Usupjanov (KGZ) | 0 | 3

Quarterfinals
Ri Kyong-il (PRK)
Park Eun-chul (KOR) | W | O
Yerbol Konyratov (KAZ) | 1 | 1
Rovshan Bayramov (AZE) | 2 | 1

Semifinals
Park Eun-chul (KOR) | 0 | 1
Rovshan Bayramov (AZE) | 3 | 2

=== Repechage ===
Repechage round 1
Vicente Lillo (ESP) | 3 | 1 | 0
Vugar Rahimov (UKR) | 3 | 8 | 6
Tibor Oláh (HUN) | W | O
Rinat Usupjanov (KGZ)

Repechage round 2
Vugar Rahimov (UKR) | 0 | 1 | 2
Venelin Venkov (BUL) | 3 | 1 | 2
Tibor Oláh (HUN) | 4 | 2
Yerbol Konyratov (KAZ) | 2 | 0

Bronze medals
Venelin Venkov (BUL) | 0 | 0
Lindsey Durlacher (USA) | 4 | 3
Tibor Oláh (HUN) | 2 | 4 | 0
Park Eun-chul (KOR) | 3 | 0 | 4
