= 2010 World Wrestling Championships – Men's Greco-Roman 55 kg =

Men's Greco-Roman 55 kg at the 2010 World Championships
- Venue: Olympic Stadium
- Dates: 6 September 2010
- Competitors: 34 from 34 nations

Medalists
gold medal	Hamid Sourian	Iran
silver medal	Choi Gyu-jin	South Korea
bronze medal	Nazyr Mankiev	Russia
bronze medal	Roman Amoyan	Armenia

The men's Greco-Roman 55 kilograms was a competition featured at the 2010 World Wrestling Championships. It was held at the Olympic Stadium in Moscow, Russia on 6 September.

== Results ==
=== Finals ===
Semifinals				Final
Choi Gyu-jin (KOR)	0	1	2
Nazyr Mankiev (RUS)	1	0	0	Choi Gyu-jin (KOR)	0	3	0
Roman Amoyan (ARM)	0	0		Hamid Sourian (IRI)	4	0	1
Hamid Sourian (IRI)	1	2

=== Top half ===
==== Section 1 ====
Round of 64

Round of 32
Péter Módos (HUN)	1	1
Donior Islamov (MDA)	0	0
Virgil Munteanu (ROU)	3	1
Anar Zeinalov (EST)	0	0
Elchin Aliyev (AZE)	2	2
Vugar Rahimov (UKR)	0	0
Elgin Loren Elwais (PLW)	0	0
Choi Gyu-jin (KOR)	5	3

Round of 16
Péter Módos (HUN)	0	1	4
Virgil Munteanu (ROU)	1	0	2
Elchin Aliyev (AZE)	0	0
Choi Gyu-jin (KOR)	1	1

Quarterfinals
Péter Módos (HUN)	2	0	0
Choi Gyu-jin (KOR)	0	2	2

==== Section 2 ====
Round of 64

Round of 32
Dawid Ersetic (POL)	5	6
Vasileios Tersenidis (GRE)	0	0
Vladimir Cariur (ISR)	0	1	0
Florian Crusius (GER)	1	0	1
Rajender Kumar (IND)	5	1
Wang Lumin (CHN)	0	0
Spenser Mango (USA)	1	0
Nazyr Mankiev (RUS)	1	1

Round of 16
Dawid Ersetic (POL)	1	2
Florian Crusius (GER)	1	0
Rajender Kumar (IND)	0	1	0
Nazyr Mankiev (RUS)	4	0	4

Quarterfinals
Dawid Ersetic (POL)	0	0
Nazyr Mankiev (RUS)	1	2

=== Bottom half ===
==== Section 3 ====
Round of 64

Round of 32
Zhangeldy Azkenov (KAZ)	6	8
Shane Parker (AUS)	0	1
Gustavo Balart (CUB)	1	1
Ivan Huzau (BLR)	0	0
Mostafa Mohamed (EGY)	0	0
Roman Amoyan (ARM)	5	2
Kohei Hasegawa (JPN)	2	3
Akbar Kuziev (UZB)	0	0

Round of 16
Zhangeldy Azkenov (KAZ)	0	0
Gustavo Balart (CUB)	3	2
Roman Amoyan (ARM)	7	3
Kohei Hasegawa (JPN)	0	0

Quarterfinals
Gustavo Balart (CUB)	0	0
Roman Amoyan (ARM)	1	3

==== Section 4 ====
Round of 64
Ferhat Tekin (TUR)	4	0	1
Joaquín Martínez (ESP)	0	1	0
Federico Manea (ITA)	0	0
Jani Haapamäki (FIN)	4	7

Round of 32
Venelin Venkov (BUL)	1	0	1
Arsen Eraliev (KGZ)	0	3	0
Mohammed Bouterfessa (ALG)	0	0
Hamid Sourian (IRI)	5	1
Lasha Gogitadze (GEO)	3	1
Jan Hocko (CZE)	0	0
Ferhat Tekin (TUR)	0	0
Jani Haapamäki (FIN)	1	3

Round of 16
Venelin Venkov (BUL)	0	2
Hamid Sourian (IRI)	2	2
Lasha Gogitadze (GEO)	0	0
Jani Haapamäki (FIN)	2	4

Quarterfinals
Hamid Sourian (IRI)	2	1
Jani Haapamäki (FIN)	0	1

=== Repechage ===
Repechage round 2
Elgin Loren Elwais (PLW)	0	0
Elchin Aliyev (AZE)	1	6
Mohammed Bouterfessa (ALG)	0	0
Venelin Venkov (BUL)	4	6

Repechage round 3
Elchin Aliyev (AZE)	0	0
Péter Módos (HUN)	1	5
Venelin Venkov (BUL)	3	0	1
Jani Haapamäki (FIN)	0	3	0

Bronze medals
Péter Módos (HUN)	0	0
Nazyr Mankiev (RUS)	1	1
Venelin Venkov (BUL)	0	0
Roman Amoyan (ARM)	8	3
