= 2009 World Wrestling Championships – Men's Greco-Roman 55 kg =

Men's Greco-Roman 55 kg at the 2009 World Championships
- Venue: Messecenter Herning
- Dates: 25 September 2009
- Competitors: 36 from 36 nations

Medalists
gold medal	Hamid Sourian	Iran
silver medal	Roman Amoyan	Armenia
bronze medal	Håkan Nyblom	Denmark
bronze medal	Rovshan Bayramov	Azerbaijan

The men's Greco-Roman 55 kilograms is a competition featured at the 2009 World Wrestling Championships, and was held at the Messecenter Herning exhibition center in Herning, Denmark on September 25.

== Results ==
Legend

- F — Won by fall
- WO — Won by walkover

=== Finals ===
Semifinals			Final
Håkan Nyblom (DEN)	0	0
Hamid Sourian (IRI)	1	6	Hamid Sourian (IRI)	5	1
Virgil Munteanu (ROU)	0	0	Roman Amoyan (ARM)	0	0
Roman Amoyan (ARM)	1	2

=== Top half ===
==== Section 1 ====
Round of 64

Round of 32
Antonas Audickas (LTU)	0	0
Vugar Rahimov (UKR)	5	7
Hồ Quang Hải (VIE)	0	0
Askhat Kudaibergenov (KAZ)	1	6
Håkan Nyblom (DEN)	0	1	1
Péter Módos (HUN)	1	0	0
Chen Wei (CHN)	0	0
Francisco Encarnación (DOM)	1	2

Round of 16
Vugar Rahimov (UKR)	2	1
Askhat Kudaibergenov (KAZ)	0	0
Håkan Nyblom (DEN)	2	1
Francisco Encarnación (DOM)	0	0

Quarterfinals
Vugar Rahimov (UKR)	0	0
Håkan Nyblom (DEN)	1	4

==== Section 2 ====
Round of 64

Round of 32
Mariusz Łoś (POL)	1	0	1
Elbek Tazhyieu (BLR)	0	1	0
Erhan Karakuş (TUR)	2	2
Ildar Hafizov (UZB)	0	0
Spenser Mango (USA)	0	1	1
Anar Zeinalov (EST)	1	0	0
Hamid Sourian (IRI)	7	3
Joaquín Martínez (ESP)	0	0

Round of 16
Mariusz Łoś (POL)	0	0
Erhan Karakuş (TUR)	1	1
Spenser Mango (USA)	0	0
Hamid Sourian (IRI)	1	6

Quarterfinals
Erhan Karakuş (TUR)	0	0
Hamid Sourian (IRI)	1	1

=== Bottom half ===
==== Section 3 ====
Round of 64

Round of 32
Gustavo Balart (CUB)	0	2	1
Kim Won-mo (PRK)	1	0	0
Kristijan Fris (SRB)	0	0
Virgil Munteanu (ROU)	1	2
Kohei Hasegawa (JPN)	1	5
Nicola Caradonna (ITA)	0	0
Aleksandar Kostadinov (BUL)	3	0
Bekkhan Mankiev (RUS)	9	6

Round of 16
Gustavo Balart (CUB)	0	2	0
Virgil Munteanu (ROU)	2	0	1
Kohei Hasegawa (JPN)	0	1	3
Bekkhan Mankiev (RUS)	4	0	0

Quarterfinals
Virgil Munteanu (ROU)	2	1
Kohei Hasegawa (JPN)	0	0

==== Section 4 ====
Round of 64
Arsen Eraliev (KGZ)	2	2
Jan Hocko (CZE)	0	0
Choi Gyu-jin (KOR)	1	1
Jorge Cardozo (VEN)	0	0
Rajender Kumar (IND)	0	0
Goderdzi Davitadze (GEO)	1	2
Jani Haapamäki (FIN)	2	0	2
Anders Rønningen (NOR)	0	2	0

Round of 32
Emil Sundberg (SWE)	0	0
Rovshan Bayramov (AZE)	5	3
Roman Amoyan (ARM)	0	1	1
Mostafa Mohamed (EGY)	1	0	0
Arsen Eraliev (KGZ)	0	0
Choi Gyu-jin (KOR)	3	6
Goderdzi Davitadze (GEO)	0	0
Jani Haapamäki (FIN)	1	7

Round of 16
Rovshan Bayramov (AZE)	0	1	0
Roman Amoyan (ARM)	2	0	2
Choi Gyu-jin (KOR)	2	1	1
Jani Haapamäki (FIN)	0	5	0

Quarterfinals
Roman Amoyan (ARM)	4	6^{F}
Choi Gyu-jin (KOR)	0	0

=== Repechage ===
Repechage round 2
Joaquín Martínez (ESP)	0	0
Spenser Mango (USA)	1	1
Mostafa Mohamed (EGY)	0	0
Rovshan Bayramov (AZE)	1	2

Repechage round 3
Spenser Mango (USA)	0	1
Erhan Karakuş (TUR)	1	2
Rovshan Bayramov (AZE)	W	O
Choi Gyu-jin (KOR)

Bronze medals
Erhan Karakuş (TUR)	0	1	0
Håkan Nyblom (DEN)	3	0	1
Rovshan Bayramov (AZE)	3	1
Virgil Munteanu (ROU)	0	0
