= 2015 World Wrestling Championships – Men's Greco-Roman 59 kg =

Men's Greco-Roman 59 kg at the 2015 World Championships
- Venue: Orleans Arena
- Dates: 8 September 2015
- Competitors: 44 from 44 nations

Medalists
gold medal	Ismael Borrero	Cuba
silver medal	Rovshan Bayramov	Azerbaijan
bronze medal	Yun Won-chol	North Korea
bronze medal	Almat Kebispayev	Kazakhstan

The men's Greco-Roman 59 kilograms is a competition featured at the 2015 World Wrestling Championships, and was held in Las Vegas, United States on 8 September 2015.

== Results ==
Legend

- D — Disqualified
- F — Won by fall

=== Finals ===
Semifinals		Final
Arsen Eraliev (KGZ)	0
Rovshan Bayramov (AZE)	4^{F}	Rovshan Bayramov (AZE)	0
Ismael Borrero (CUB)	9	Ismael Borrero (CUB)	8
Almat Kebispayev (KAZ)	1

=== Top half ===
==== Section 1 ====
Round of 64

Round of 32
Arsen Eraliev (KGZ)	10
Abner Elel (GUA)	1
Dmytro Tsymbaliuk (UKR)	0
Andrés Montaño (ECU)	10
Murad Mikeladze (GEO)	2
Ivan Lizatović (CRO)	4
Dylan Williams (CAN)	0
Máté Krasznai (HUN)	8

Round of 16
Arsen Eraliev (KGZ)	8
Andrés Montaño (ECU)	0
Ivan Lizatović (CRO)	2
Máté Krasznai (HUN)	7

Quarterfinals
Arsen Eraliev (KGZ)	8
Máté Krasznai (HUN)	0

==== Section 2 ====
Round of 64

Round of 32
Rovshan Bayramov (AZE)	9
Ravinder Singh (IND)	1
Virgil Munteanu (ROU)	0
Yun Won-chol (PRK)	9
Hamid Sourian (IRI)	8
Raiber Rodríguez (VEN)	0
Jani Haapamäki (FIN)	5
Wesley Morales (PUR)	0

Round of 16
Rovshan Bayramov (AZE)	8
Yun Won-chol (PRK)	7
Hamid Sourian (IRI)	5^{F}
Jani Haapamäki (FIN)	0

Quarterfinals
Rovshan Bayramov (AZE)	2
Hamid Sourian (IRI)	0^{D}

=== Bottom half ===
==== Section 3 ====
Round of 64
Albert Baghumyan (ESP)	4
Soslan Daurov (BLR)	8
Hammet Rüstem (TUR)	9
Cristóbal Torres (CHI)	0
Ismael Borrero (CUB)	4
Spenser Mango (USA)	2
Michal Novák (CZE)	0
Deniz Menekse (GER)	9

Round of 32
Kim Seung-hak (KOR)	14^{F}
Andrey Tsaryuk (ISR)	6
Stepan Maryanyan (RUS)	9
Tian Qiye (CHN)	0
Soslan Daurov (BLR)	8
Hammet Rüstem (TUR)	0
Ismael Borrero (CUB)	5
Deniz Menekse (GER)	4

Round of 16
Kim Seung-hak (KOR)	9
Stepan Maryanyan (RUS)	7
Soslan Daurov (BLR)	0
Ismael Borrero (CUB)	8

Quarterfinals
Kim Seung-hak (KOR)	6
Ismael Borrero (CUB)	8

==== Section 4 ====
Round of 64
Roman Amoyan (ARM)	8
Victor Ciobanu (MDA)	2
Elmurat Tasmuradov (UZB)	9
Ali Soto (MEX)	2
Ivo Angelov (BUL)	4
Tarik Belmadani (FRA)	0
Kristijan Fris (SRB)	4
Tobias Fonnesbek (DEN)	0
Stig-André Berge (NOR)	2
Shota Tanokura (JPN)	1
Kemmy Betwell (MHL)	0
Diego Romanelli (BRA)	8
Michał Tracz (POL)	0
Almat Kebispayev (KAZ)	6
Haithem Mahmoud (EGY)	5
Mehdi Messaoudi (MAR)	0

Round of 32
Roman Amoyan (ARM)	3
Elmurat Tasmuradov (UZB)	8
Ivo Angelov (BUL)	6
Kristijan Fris (SRB)	0
Stig-André Berge (NOR)	10
Diego Romanelli (BRA)	2
Almat Kebispayev (KAZ)	7
Haithem Mahmoud (EGY)	6

Round of 16
Elmurat Tasmuradov (UZB)	6
Ivo Angelov (BUL)	6
Stig-André Berge (NOR)	0
Almat Kebispayev (KAZ)	6

Quarterfinals
Ivo Angelov (BUL)	3
Almat Kebispayev (KAZ)	4

=== Repechage ===
Repechage round 1
Spenser Mango (USA)	4
Deniz Menekse (GER)	4

Repechage round 2
Ravinder Singh (IND)	2
Yun Won-chol (PRK)	6
Spenser Mango (USA)	0
Soslan Daurov (BLR)	8

Repechage round 3
Yun Won-chol (PRK)	6
Hamid Sourian (IRI)	5
Soslan Daurov (BLR)	10
Kim Seung-hak (KOR)	2

Bronze medals
Yun Won-chol (PRK)	8
Arsen Eraliev (KGZ)	0
Soslan Daurov (BLR)	4
Almat Kebispayev (KAZ)	4^{F}
