= 2013 World Wrestling Championships – Men's Greco-Roman 55 kg =

Men's Greco-Roman 55 kg at the 2013 World Championships
- Venue: László Papp Budapest Sports Arena
- Dates: 20 September 2013
- Competitors: 33 from 33 nations

Medalists
gold medal	Yun Won-chol	North Korea
silver medal	Choi Gyu-jin	South Korea
bronze medal	Péter Módos	Hungary
bronze medal	Roman Amoyan	Armenia

The men's Greco-Roman 55 kilograms is a competition featured at the 2013 World Wrestling Championships, and was held at the László Papp Budapest Sports Arena in Budapest, Hungary on 20 September 2013.

== Results ==
Legend

- C — Won by 3 cautions given to the opponent
- F — Won by fall

=== Finals ===
Semifinals		Final
Ivan Tatarinov (RUS)	0
Yun Won-chol (PRK)	7	Yun Won-chol (PRK)	4
Choi Gyu-jin (KOR)	9^{C}	Choi Gyu-jin (KOR)	3
Roman Amoyan (ARM)	6

=== Top half ===
==== Section 1 ====
Round of 64

Round of 32
Ivan Tatarinov (RUS)	6^{F}
Joakim Fagerlund (SWE)	0
Victor Ciobanu (MDA)	6^{F}
Aleksandar Kostadinov (BUL)	3
Gaurav Sharma (IND)	8
Lazaros Karathanasis (GRE)	0
Fatih Üçüncü (TUR)	0
Orkhan Ahmadov (AZE)	4

Round of 16
Ivan Tatarinov (RUS)	7
Victor Ciobanu (MDA)	0
Gaurav Sharma (IND)	0
Orkhan Ahmadov (AZE)	8

Quarterfinals
Ivan Tatarinov (RUS)	4
Orkhan Ahmadov (AZE)	2

==== Section 2 ====
Round of 64

Round of 32
Ivan Lizatović (CRO)	0
Yun Won-chol (PRK)	8
Lukas Höglmeier (GER)	8
Michal Novák (CZE)	2
Thomas Rønningen (NOR)	4
Anar Zeinalov (EST)	2
Mohammad Faghiri (IRI)	8
Péter Módos (HUN)	10

Round of 16
Yun Won-chol (PRK)	7
Lukas Höglmeier (GER)	0
Thomas Rønningen (NOR)	2
Péter Módos (HUN)	2

Quarterfinals
Yun Won-chol (PRK)	7
Péter Módos (HUN)	0

=== Bottom half ===
==== Section 3 ====
Round of 64

Round of 32
Jairo Medina (VEN)	0
Kanybek Zholchubekov (KGZ)	6
Đới Đăng Tiến (VIE)	0
Shota Tanokura (JPN)	7
Spenser Mango (USA)	4
Jani Haapamäki (FIN)	0
Fouad Fajari (MAR)	0
Choi Gyu-jin (KOR)	8

Round of 16
Kanybek Zholchubekov (KGZ)	4^{C}
Shota Tanokura (JPN)	3
Spenser Mango (USA)	2
Choi Gyu-jin (KOR)	4

Quarterfinals
Kanybek Zholchubekov (KGZ)	0
Choi Gyu-jin (KOR)	3

==== Section 4 ====
Round of 64
Cristian Novas (DOM)	0
Elbek Tazhyieu (BLR)	7

Round of 32
Bachana Putkaradze (GEO)	0
Haithem Mahmoud (EGY)	8
Dawid Ersetic (POL)	0
Nursultan Kalmurzayev (KAZ)	6
Bao Liri (CHN)	2
Vugar Rahimov (UKR)	5^{F}
Roman Amoyan (ARM)	4
Elbek Tazhyieu (BLR)	0

Round of 16
Haithem Mahmoud (EGY)	1
Nursultan Kalmurzayev (KAZ)	9
Vugar Rahimov (UKR)	0
Roman Amoyan (ARM)	7

Quarterfinals
Nursultan Kalmurzayev (KAZ)	0
Roman Amoyan (ARM)	7

=== Repechage ===
Repechage round 2
Ivan Lizatović (CRO)	8
Lukas Höglmeier (GER)	1
Fouad Fajari (MAR)	0
Spenser Mango (USA)	7

Repechage round 3
Ivan Lizatović (CRO)	0
Péter Módos (HUN)	6
Spenser Mango (USA)	6
Kanybek Zholchubekov (KGZ)	2

Bronze medals
Péter Módos (HUN)	7
Ivan Tatarinov (RUS)	3
Spenser Mango (USA)	4
Roman Amoyan (ARM)	5
