= 2016 European Wrestling Championships – Men's Greco-Roman 59 kg =

The men's Greco-Roman 59 kg is a competition featured at the 2016 European Wrestling Championships, and was held in Riga, Latvia on March 12.

== Medalists ==
Gold	Mingiyan Semenov; Russia
Silver	Roman Amoyan; Armenia
Bronze	Donior Islamov; Moldova
Bronze	Dmytro Tsymbaliuk; Ukraine

== Results ==
Legend

- F — Won by fall

=== Final ===
Final
Mingiyan Semenov (RUS)	8
Roman Amoyan (ARM)	0

=== Top half ===
==== Section 1 ====
Round of 32

Round of 16
Zoltán Lévai (SVK)	0
Mustafa Saglam (TUR)	8
Kristijan Fris (SRB)	6
Radoslav Vasilev (BUL)	0
Mingiyan Semenov (RUS)	8
Donior Islamov (MDA)	0
Federico Manea (ITA)	0
Albert Baghumyan (ESP)	2

Quarterfinals
Mustafa Saglam (TUR)	1
Kristijan Fris (SRB)	4
Mingiyan Semenov (RUS)	8
Albert Baghumyan (ESP)	0

Semifinals
Kristijan Fris (SRB)	0
Mingiyan Semenov (RUS)	10

=== Bottom half ===
==== Section 2 ====
Round of 32
Péter Módos (HUN)	1
Dmytro Tsymbaliuk (UKR)	10
Michał Tracz (POL)	5
Aleksandrs Jurkjans (LAT)	5
Taleh Mammadov (AZE)	6
Virgil Munteanu (ROM)	2
Soslan Daurov (BLR)	12
Jussi-Pekka Niemistoe (FIN)	2

Round of 16
Roman Amoyan (ARM)	9
Ivan Lizatovic (CRO)	0
Apostolos Manouilidis (GRE)	1
Irakli Shavadzhe (GEO)	11
Dmytro Tsymbaliuk (UKR)	4
Michał Tracz (POL)	0
Taleh Mammadov (AZE)	3^{F}
Soslan Daurov (BLR)	5

Quarterfinals
Roman Amoyan (ARM)	13
Irakli Shavadzhe (GEO)	6
Dmytro Tsymbaliuk (UKR)	2
Taleh Mammadov (AZE)	2

Semifinals
Roman Amoyan (ARM)	4
Dmytro Tsymbaliuk (UKR)	0

=== Repechage ===
Repechage round 2
Donior Islamov (MDA)	13
Albert Baghumyan (ESP)	4
Ivan Lizatovic (CRO)	14
Irakli Shavadzhe (GEO)	9

Bronze medals
Donior Islamov (MDA)	8
Kristijan Fris (SRB)	0
Ivan Lizatovic (CRO)	0
Dmytro Tsymbaliuk (UKR)	9
