= Wrestling at the 2012 Summer Olympics – Men's Greco-Roman 55 kg =

Men's Greco-Roman 55 kg at the Games of the XXX Olympiad
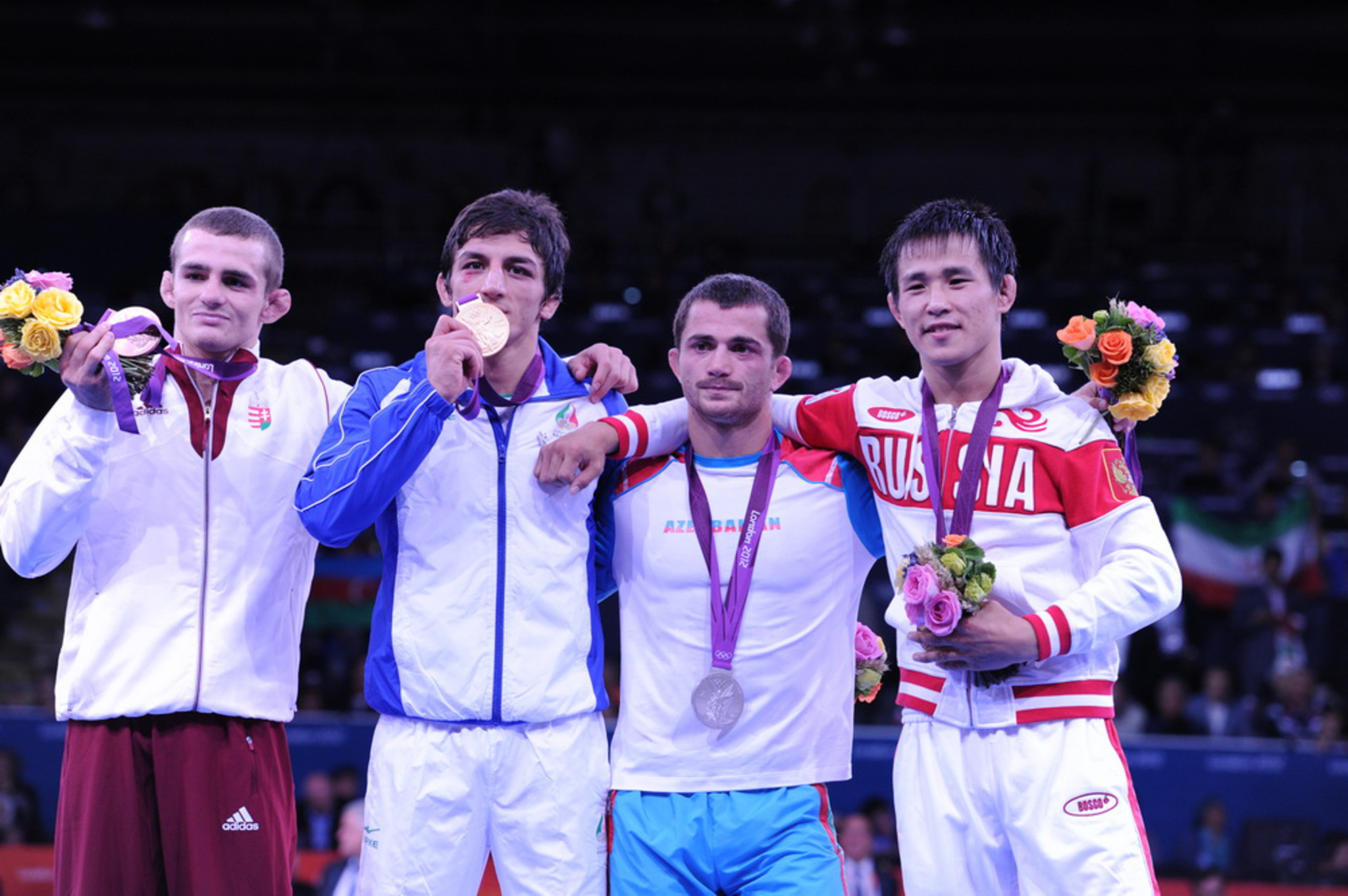
- Venue: ExCeL London
- Date: 5 August 2012
- Competitors: 19 from 19 nations

Medalists
1st place, gold medalist(s)		Hamid Sourian	Iran
2nd place, silver medalist(s)		Rovshan Bayramov	Azerbaijan
3rd place, bronze medalist(s)		Péter Módos	Hungary
3rd place, bronze medalist(s)		Mingiyan Semenov	Russia

Men's Greco-Roman 55 kilograms competition at the 2012 Summer Olympics in London, United Kingdom, took place on 5 August at ExCeL London.

This Greco-Roman wrestling competition consists of a single-elimination tournament, with a repechage used to determine the winner of two bronze medals. The two finalists face off for gold and silver medals. Each wrestler who loses to one of the two finalists moves into the repechage, culminating in a pair of bronze medal matches featuring the semifinal losers each facing the remaining repechage opponent from their half of the bracket.

Each bout consists of up to three rounds, lasting two minutes apiece. The wrestler who scores more points in each round is the winner of that rounds; the bout ends when one wrestler has won two rounds (and thus the match).

== Schedule ==
All times are British Summer Time (UTC+01:00)

Date	Time	Event
5 August 2012	13:00	Qualification rounds
5 August 2012	17:45	Repechage
5 August 2012	18:45	Finals

== Results ==
=== Final ===
Final
Hamid Sourian (IRI)	2	1
Rovshan Bayramov (AZE)	0	0

=== Top half ===
Qualifications

1/8 finals
Fouad Fajari (MAR)	0	0
Håkan Nyblom (DEN)	1	5
Elbek Tazhyieu (BLR)	0	0
Kohei Hasegawa (JPN)	1	3
Hamid Sourian (IRI)	4	0	2
Arsen Eraliev (KGZ)	0	2	1
Elmurat Tasmuradov (UZB)	0	0
Péter Módos (HUN)	2	2

1/4 finals
Håkan Nyblom (DEN)	3	2
Kohei Hasegawa (JPN)	0	0
Hamid Sourian (IRI)	2	1
Péter Módos (HUN)	0	0

Semifinals
Håkan Nyblom (DEN)	0	0
Hamid Sourian (IRI)	3	3

=== Bottom half ===
Qualifications
Li Shujin (CHN)	4	0	2
Vugar Rahimov (UKR)	0	2	0
Rovshan Bayramov (AZE)	1	1
Mingiyan Semenov (RUS)	0	0
Spenser Mango (USA)	5	1
Mohamed Abouhalima (EGY)	1	0

1/8 finals
Gustavo Balart (CUB)	3	1
Ayhan Karakuş (TUR)	0	0
Yun Won-chol (PRK)	0	0
Choi Gyu-jin (KOR)	1	2
Aleksandar Kostadinov (BUL)	2	0	0
Li Shujin (CHN)	0	2	2
Rovshan Bayramov (AZE)	4	4
Spenser Mango (USA)	0	0

1/4 finals
Gustavo Balart (CUB)	0	2	0
Choi Gyu-jin (KOR)	1	0	1
Li Shujin (CHN)	0	0
Rovshan Bayramov (AZE)	3	2

Semifinals
Choi Gyu-jin (KOR)	0	0
Rovshan Bayramov (AZE)	1	2

=== Repechage ===
Repechage round 1
Mingiyan Semenov (RUS)	2	1
Spenser Mango (USA)	0	0

Repechage round 2
Arsen Eraliev (KGZ)	0	0
Péter Módos (HUN)	1	2
Mingiyan Semenov (RUS)	2	1
Li Shujin (CHN)	0	0

Bronze medals
Péter Módos (HUN)	3	0	2
Håkan Nyblom (DEN)	0	3	0
Mingiyan Semenov (RUS)	3	1
Choi Gyu-jin (KOR)	1	0

== Final standing ==
Rank	Athlete
1st place, gold medalist(s)	Hamid Sourian (IRI)
2nd place, silver medalist(s)	Rovshan Bayramov (AZE)
3rd place, bronze medalist(s)	Péter Módos (HUN)
3rd place, bronze medalist(s)	Mingiyan Semenov (RUS)
5	Håkan Nyblom (DEN)
5	Choi Gyu-jin (KOR)
7	Li Shujin (CHN)
8	Gustavo Balart (CUB)
9	Spenser Mango (USA)
10	Kohei Hasegawa (JPN)
11	Arsen Eraliev (KGZ)
12	Aleksandar Kostadinov (BUL)
13	Vugar Rahimov (UKR)
14	Mohamed Abouhalima (EGY)
15	Yun Won-chol (PRK)
16	Elbek Tazhyieu (BLR)
16	Elmurat Tasmuradov (UZB)
16	Ayhan Karakuş (TUR)
19	Fouad Fajari (MAR)
