= Ildar Hafizov =

Tatar-American Greco-Roman wrestler (born 1988)

Ildar Hafizov Ильдар Хафизов
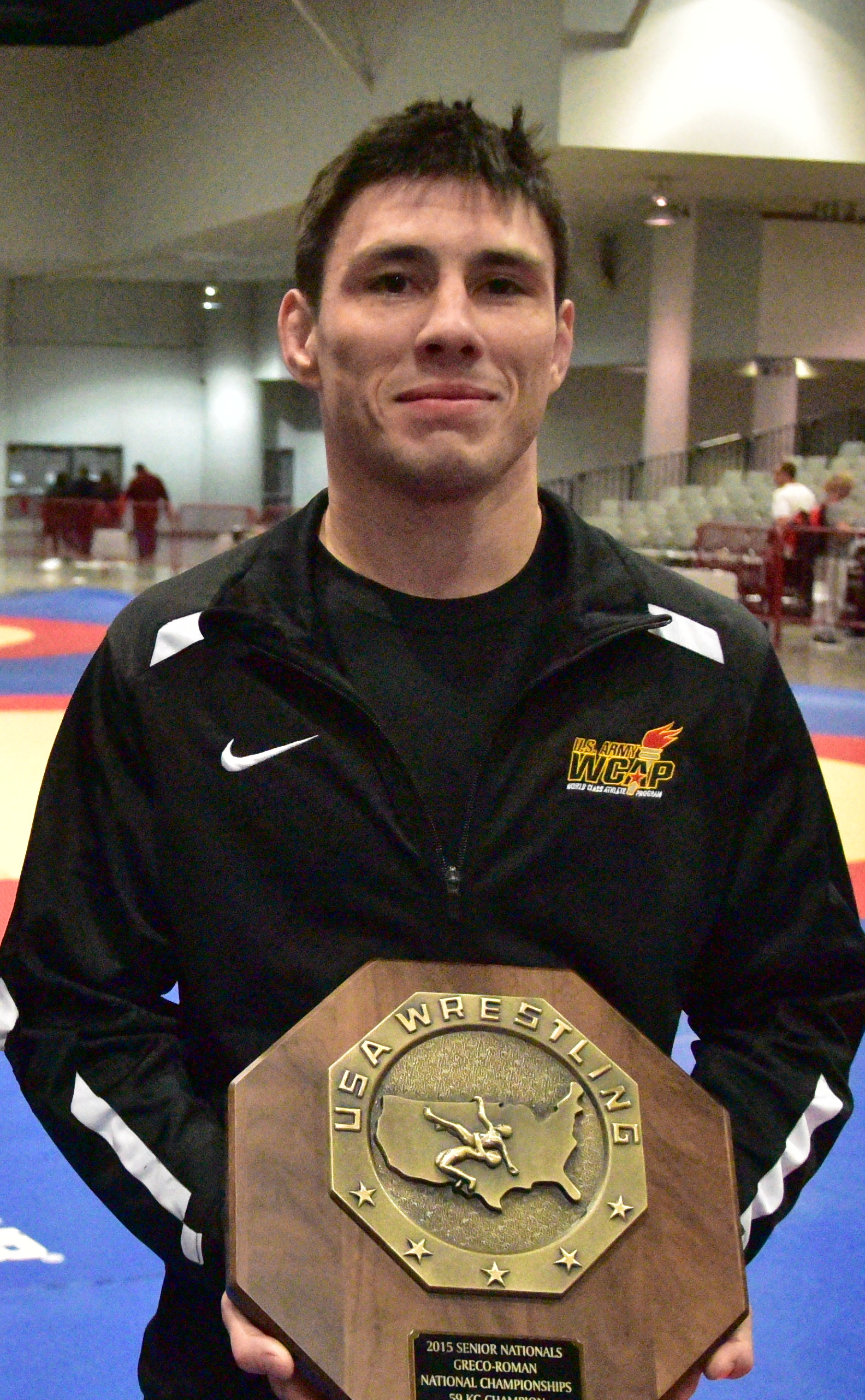
- Hafizov in 2015

Personal information
- Full name: Ildar Shavkatovich Hafizov
- Nationality: American; Uzbekistani
- Born: January 30, 1988 (age 38) Tashkent, Uzbek SSR, Soviet Union
- Height: 1.66 m (5 ft 5 in)
- Weight: 59 kg (130 lb)

Sport
- Country: United States
- Style: Greco-Roman wrestling
- Club: U.S Army WCAP
- Coach: Ravil Biktikov; Spenser Mango
Medal record
Men's Greco-Roman wrestling
Representing United States
Pan American Games
Gold medal – first place	2023 Santiago	60 kg
Bronze medal – third place	2019 Lima	60 kg
Pan American Championships
Silver medal – second place	2021 Guatemala City	60 kg
World Military Championships
Silver medal – second place	2024 Yerevan	63 kg
USA Championships
Gold medal – first place	2017 Las Vegas	59 kg
Vantaa Cup
Gold medal – first place	2015 Vantaa	59 kg
Thor Masters
Gold medal – first place	2017 Nykøbing Falster	59 kg
Representing Uzbekistan
Asian Championships
Silver medal – second place	2011 Tashkent	55 kg
Bronze medal – third place	2007 Bishkek	55 kg

Ildar Shavkatovich Hafizov (Russian: Ильдар Шавкатович Хафизов; Tatar: Илдар Шәүкәт улы Хәфиз; born January 30, 1988) is an Uzbekistani-American Greco-Roman wrestler of Tatar heritage, who competes in the featherweight category (60 kg). 2011 Asian and 2021 Pan American Championships runner-up, 2023 Pan American Games gold medalist.

== Background ==
Hafizov was born in Tashkent, Soviet Union into a Tatar family. He started wrestling at the age of ten.

== Sport career ==
Hafizov competed for the Uzbek wrestling squad in the men's 55 kg class at the 2008 Summer Olympics in Beijing. He lost the first prelims match to Russia's Nazyr Mankiev, who was able to score three points each in two straight periods, leaving Hafizov with a single point. Because his opponent advanced further into the final match, Hafizov offered another shot for the bronze medal by entering the repechage bouts. He was defeated by Serbia's Kristijan Fris in the first round, with a technical score of 1–5. Before his change of domicile to the United States in 2014, Hafizov represented his native Uzbekistan and has picked up the bronze medal at the 2007 Asian Wrestling Championships and the silver medal in his respective division at the 2011 Asian Wrestling Championships, coincidentally in his home city Tashkent, losing out to Kyrgyzstan's Arsen Eraliev.

In May 2015, Hafizov enlisted in the United States Army. At the 2017 U.S. Open Championships, he won a gold medal at 59 kg categories. At the 2019 Pan American Games Hafizov earned a bronze medal at 60 kg. He has qualified to represent the United States at the 2020 Summer Olympics. In 2021, he won a silver medal at the Pan American Championships. At the 2023 Pan American Games he earned the gold medal.

In 2024, he competed at the Pan American Wrestling Olympic Qualification Tournament held in Acapulco, Mexico hoping to qualify for the 2024 Summer Olympics in Paris, France. He was eliminated in his first match. In November 2024, he was the finalist at the World Military Championships in Yerevan, Armenia.

Hafizov has been a world team member four times, in 2017, 2019 2022 and 2023.

== Personal life ==
Ildar is of Tatar ethnicity.

Ildar has two daughters. His wife Dina Hafizova is a former freestyle wrestler.

He is currently a sergeant of the U.S. army. Along with serving as a motor vehicle operator within the U.S. Army, he is also a member of the U.S. Army World Class Athlete Program.
