= Wrestling at the 2015 Pan American Games – Men's Greco-Roman 59 kg =

Men's Greco-Roman 59 kg at the 2015 Pan American Games
- Venue: Mississauga Sports Centre
- Dates: July 15
- Competitors: 9 from 9 nations

Medalists
Gold medal	Andrés Montaño	Ecuador
Silver medal	Ali Soto	Mexico
Bronze medal	Cristóbal Torres	Chile
Bronze medal	Spenser Mango	United States

The Men's Greco-Roman 59 kg competition of the Wrestling events at the 2015 Pan American Games in Toronto were held on July 15 at the Mississauga Sports Centre.

== Schedule ==
All times are Eastern Daylight Time (UTC-4).

Date	Time	Round
July 15, 2015	14:35	1/8 finals
July 15, 2015	15:38	Quarterfinals
July 15, 2015	16:32	Semifinals
July 15, 2015	20:05	Bronze medal matches
July 15, 2015	20:23	Final

== Results ==
=== Final ===
Qualifications
Ismael Borrero (CUB)	8
Dicther Toro (COL)	0

Quarterfinals
Ali Soto (MEX)	9
Dylan Williams (CAN)	0
Cristóbal Torres (CHI)	8
Marvin Chávez (BOL)	0
Jansel Ramírez (DOM)	6
Andrés Montaño (ECU)	7
Spenser Mango (USA)	3
Ismael Borrero (CUB)	3

Semifinals
Ali Soto (MEX)	8
Cristóbal Torres (CHI)	0
Andrés Montaño (ECU)	9
Spenser Mango (USA)	1

Finals
Ali Soto (MEX)	0
Andrés Montaño (ECU)	11

=== Repechage ===
Repechage round 2
Bye
Dylan Williams (CAN)
Bye
Jansel Ramírez (DOM)

Bronze medal match
Dylan Williams (CAN)	0
Cristóbal Torres (CHI)	3
Jansel Ramirez (DOM)	3
Spenser Mango (USA)	6
