= Lasha Gogitadze =

Georgian wrestler

Personal information
- Nationality: Georgia
- Born: 4 June 1987 (age 39) Kutaisi, Georgian SSR, Soviet Union
- Height: 1.64 m (5 ft 4 1/2 in)
- Weight: 55 kg (121 lb)

Sport
- Sport: Wrestling
- Event: Greco-Roman
- Coached by: Kvitsha Gogitadze

Lasha Gogitadze (Georgian: ლაშა გოგიტიძე; born June 4, 1987, in Kutaisi) is an amateur Georgian Greco-Roman wrestler, who played for the men's featherweight category. Gogitadze represented Georgia at the 2008 Summer Olympics in Beijing, where he competed for the men's 55 kg class. He first defeated China's Jiao Huafeng in the preliminary round of sixteen, before losing out the quarterfinal match to Armenia's Roman Amoyan, with a two-set technical score (1–4, 2–3), and a classification point score of 1–3.
