= Mohamed Abouhalima =

Egyptian Greco-Roman wrestler

Personal information
- Full name: Muhammad Al-Sa'id Abdallah; Abouhalima
- Nationality: Egypt
- Born: 19 November 1993 (age 32) Alexandria, Egypt
- Height: 1.53 m (5 ft 0 in)
- Weight: 55 kg (121 lb)

Sport
- Sport: Wrestling
- Event: Greco-Roman

Muhammad Al-Sa'id Abdallah Abouhalima (also Mohamed Abouhalima, Arabic: أبو حليمة محمد السعيد عبد الله ابو حليمة; born November 19, 1993, in Alexandria) is an Egyptian amateur Greco-Roman wrestler, who competes in the men's featherweight category. Abouhalima represented Egypt at the 2012 Summer Olympics in London, where he competed in the 55 kg class. He lost the qualifying match to U.S. wrestler Spenser Mango, who was able to score six points in two straight periods, leaving Abouhalima with a single point.
