= 2008 European Wrestling Championships =

- Host city: Tampere, Finland
- Dates: 1 – 6 April 2008

Champions
- Freestyle: Russia
- Greco-Roman: Russia
- Women: Russia

The 2008 FILA European Wrestling Championships were held in Tampere, Finland. The event took place from 1 April to 6 April 2008.

== Medal table ==
Rank	Nation	Gold	Silver	Bronze	Total
1	Russia	7	3	6	16
2	Ukraine	3	1	4	8
3	Azerbaijan	2	1	4	7
4	Turkey	2	1	3	6
5	Georgia	1	3	1	5
6	Bulgaria	1	1	2	4
6	Sweden	1	1	2	4
8	Armenia	1	1	0	2
9	Hungary	1	0	3	4
10	Finland	1	0	1	2
11	Slovakia	1	0	0	1
12	Belarus	0	3	2	5
13	France	0	2	2	4
14	Germany	0	1	2	3
15	Romania	0	1	1	2
16	Moldova	0	1	0	1
17	Greece	0	0	2	2
17	Poland	0	0	2	2
19	Albania	0	0	1	1
19	Denmark	0	0	1	1
19	Italy	0	0	1	1
19	Serbia	0	0	1	1
19	Spain	0	0	1	1
Totals (23 entries)		21	20	42	83

== Medal summary ==
=== Men's freestyle ===
Event	Gold	Silver	Bronze
55 kg	(Russia) Djamal Otarsultanov	(Belarus) Rizvan Gadzhiev	(Turkey) Sezar Akgül
55 kg	(Russia) Djamal Otarsultanov	(Belarus) Rizvan Gadzhiev	(Spain) Francisco Sánchez
60 kg	(Ukraine) Vasyl Fedoryshyn	(France) Didier Païs	(Hungary) Gergõ Wöller
60 kg	(Ukraine) Vasyl Fedoryshyn	(France) Didier Païs	(Bulgaria) Anatolie Guidea
66 kg	(Turkey) Ramazan Şahin	(Georgia (country)) Koba Kakaladze	(Russia) Rasul Djukayev
66 kg	(Turkey) Ramazan Şahin	(Georgia (country)) Koba Kakaladze	(Azerbaijan) Emin Azizov
74 kg	(Russia) Makhach Murtazaliev	(Belarus) Murad Gaidarov	(Greece) Emzarios Bentinidis
74 kg	(Russia) Makhach Murtazaliev	(Belarus) Murad Gaidarov	(Azerbaijan) Çamsulvara Çamsulvarayev
84 kg	(Russia) Georgy Ketoev	(Georgia (country)) Revaz Mindorashvili	(Germany) David Bichinashvili
84 kg	(Russia) Georgy Ketoev	(Georgia (country)) Revaz Mindorashvili	(Azerbaijan) Novruz Temrezov
96 kg	(Georgia (country)) Georgi Gogshelidze	(Ukraine) Georgi Tibilov	(Turkey) Hakan Koç
96 kg	(Georgia (country)) Georgi Gogshelidze	(Ukraine) Georgi Tibilov	(Russia) Khadzhimurat Gatsalov
120 kg	(Slovakia) David Musulbes	none	(Russia) Bakhtiyar Akhmedov
120 kg	(Slovakia) David Musulbes	none	(Azerbaijan) Ali Isaev

=== Men's Greco-Roman ===
Event	Gold	Silver	Bronze
55 kg	(Azerbaijan) Rovshan Bayramov	(Armenia) Roman Amoyan	(Romania) Virgil Munteanu
55 kg	(Azerbaijan) Rovshan Bayramov	(Armenia) Roman Amoyan	(Hungary) Péter Módos
60 kg	(Finland) Jarkko Ala-Huikku	(Bulgaria) Armen Nazaryan	(Serbia) Davor Štefanek
60 kg	(Finland) Jarkko Ala-Huikku	(Bulgaria) Armen Nazaryan	(Denmark) Håkan Nyblom
66 kg	(Ukraine) Armen Vardanyan	(Romania) Ion Panait	(Bulgaria) Plamen Petrov
66 kg	(Ukraine) Armen Vardanyan	(Romania) Ion Panait	(Russia) Ruslan Belkhoroev
74 kg	(Hungary) Péter Bácsi	(Turkey) Şeref Tüfenk	(France) Christophe Guenot
74 kg	(Hungary) Péter Bácsi	(Turkey) Şeref Tüfenk	(Russia) Evgeni Popov
84 kg	(Turkey) Nazmi Avluca	(Georgia (country)) Badri Khasaia	(Sweden) Ara Abrahamian
84 kg	(Turkey) Nazmi Avluca	(Georgia (country)) Badri Khasaia	(Italy) Andrea Minguzzi
96 kg	(Russia) Aslanbek Khushtov	(Germany) Mirko Englich	(Albania) Elis Guri
96 kg	(Russia) Aslanbek Khushtov	(Germany) Mirko Englich	(Georgia (country)) Ramaz Nozadze
120 kg	(Armenia) Yury Patrikeyev	(Russia) Khasan Baroyev	(Belarus) Ioseb Chugoshvili
120 kg	(Armenia) Yury Patrikeyev	(Russia) Khasan Baroyev	(Turkey) Atilla Güzel

=== Women's freestyle ===
Event	Gold	Silver	Bronze
48 kg	(Azerbaijan) Mariya Stadnik	(France) Vanessa Boubryemm	(Ukraine) Oleksandra Kohut
48 kg	(Azerbaijan) Mariya Stadnik	(France) Vanessa Boubryemm	(Poland) Iwona Matkowska
51 kg	(Russia) Anna Trusova	(Sweden) Sofia Mattsson	(Finland) Tiina Ylinen
51 kg	(Russia) Anna Trusova	(Sweden) Sofia Mattsson	(Ukraine) Yuliya Blahinya
55 kg	(Russia) Nataliya Golts	(Moldova) Ludmila Cristea	(Greece) Sofia Poumpouridou
55 kg	(Russia) Nataliya Golts	(Moldova) Ludmila Cristea	(Ukraine) Tetyana Lazareva
59 kg	(Sweden) Ida-Theres Nerell	(Azerbaijan) Elvira Mursalova	(Russia) Larissa Kanaeva
59 kg	(Sweden) Ida-Theres Nerell	(Azerbaijan) Elvira Mursalova	(Ukraine) Nataliya Synyshyn
63 kg	(Russia) Alena Kartashova	(Belarus) Volha Khilko	(Poland) Monika Michalik
63 kg	(Russia) Alena Kartashova	(Belarus) Volha Khilko	(Hungary) Marianna Sastin
67 kg	(Ukraine) Maryana Kvyatkovska	(Russia) Natalya Kuksina	(Belarus) Hanna Beliayeva
67 kg	(Ukraine) Maryana Kvyatkovska	(Russia) Natalya Kuksina	(France) Lise Golliot-Legrand
72 kg	(Bulgaria) Stanka Zlateva	(Russia) Gouzel Maniourova	(Germany) Anita Schätzle
72 kg	(Bulgaria) Stanka Zlateva	(Russia) Gouzel Maniourova	(Sweden) Jenny Fransson
