= 2013 Asian Wrestling Championships =

- Host city: New Delhi, India
- Dates: 18–22 April 2013
- Stadium: K. D. Jadhav Indoor Stadium

Champions
- Freestyle: India
- Greco-Roman: South Korea
- Women: China

The 2013 Asian Wrestling Championships were held at the Indira Gandhi Sports Complex in New Delhi, India. The event took place from 18 to 22 April 2013.

== Medal table ==
Rank	Nation	Gold	Silver	Bronze	Total
1	South Korea	5	2	1	8
2	Uzbekistan	4	0	0	4
3	Japan	2	3	5	10
4	China	2	3	4	9
5	India	2	1	6	9
6	Kazakhstan	2	1	4	7
7	North Korea	2	1	3	6
8	Mongolia	1	4	3	8
9	Iran	1	3	5	9
10	Kyrgyzstan	0	1	8	9
11	Tajikistan	0	1	1	2
12	Vietnam	0	1	0	1
13	Iraq	0	0	1	1
13	Jordan	0	0	1	1
Totals (14 entries)		21	21	42	84

== Team ranking ==
Rank	Men's freestyle		Men's Greco-Roman		Women's freestyle	
Rank	Team	Points	Team	Points	Team	Points
1	India	48	South Korea	58	China	56
2	Iran	45	Iran	50	Japan	54
3	Mongolia	40	Kazakhstan	49	Mongolia	54
4	South Korea	38	Kyrgyzstan	47	India	49
5	Kyrgyzstan	38	Japan	37	Kazakhstan	40
6	Uzbekistan	36	China	28	South Korea	27
7	Tajikistan	33	India	28	North Korea	26
8	Japan	32	Uzbekistan	27	Chinese Taipei	23
9	Kazakhstan	26	Tajikistan	18	Kyrgyzstan	20
10	China	25	Iraq	13	Vietnam	19

== Medal summary ==
=== Men's freestyle ===
Event	Gold	Silver	Bronze
55 kg	Amit Kumar Dahiya; India	Yang Kyong-il; North Korea	Rassul Kaliyev; Kazakhstan
55 kg	Amit Kumar Dahiya; India	Yang Kyong-il; North Korea	Batboldyn Nomin; Mongolia
60 kg	Hwang Ryong-hak; North Korea	Yang Jae-hoon; South Korea	Daulet Niyazbekov; Kazakhstan
60 kg	Hwang Ryong-hak; North Korea	Yang Jae-hoon; South Korea	Bajrang Punia; India
66 kg	Amit Kumar Dhankar; India	Ganzorigiin Mandakhnaran; Mongolia	Ulukman Mamatov; Kyrgyzstan
66 kg	Amit Kumar Dhankar; India	Ganzorigiin Mandakhnaran; Mongolia	Toshinori Ishida; Japan
74 kg	Rashid Kurbanov; Uzbekistan	Zhang Chongyao; China	Kohei Kitamura; Japan
74 kg	Rashid Kurbanov; Uzbekistan	Zhang Chongyao; China	Ezzatollah Akbari; Iran
84 kg	Umidjon Ismanov; Uzbekistan	Aibek Usupov; Kyrgyzstan	Safarali Komildzoni; Tajikistan
84 kg	Umidjon Ismanov; Uzbekistan	Aibek Usupov; Kyrgyzstan	Ehsan Amini; Iran
96 kg	Kim Jae-gang; South Korea	Rustam Iskandari; Tajikistan	Hamed Tatari; Iran
96 kg	Kim Jae-gang; South Korea	Rustam Iskandari; Tajikistan	Dorjkhandyn Khüderbulga; Mongolia
120 kg	Parviz Hadi; Iran	Jargalsaikhany Chuluunbat; Mongolia	Hitender Beniwal; India
120 kg	Parviz Hadi; Iran	Jargalsaikhany Chuluunbat; Mongolia	Aiaal Lazarev; Kyrgyzstan

=== Men's Greco-Roman ===
Event	Gold	Silver	Bronze
55 kg	Choi Gyu-jin; South Korea	Shota Tanokura; Japan	Kanybek Zholchubekov; Kyrgyzstan
55 kg	Choi Gyu-jin; South Korea	Shota Tanokura; Japan	Yun Won-chol; North Korea
60 kg	Elmurat Tasmuradov; Uzbekistan	Abdolmohammad Papi; Iran	Arsen Eraliev; Kyrgyzstan
60 kg	Elmurat Tasmuradov; Uzbekistan	Abdolmohammad Papi; Iran	Wang Lumin; China
66 kg	Kim Ji-hun; South Korea	Mehdi Zeidvand; Iran	Hiroyuki Shimizu; Japan
66 kg	Kim Ji-hun; South Korea	Mehdi Zeidvand; Iran	Yerbol Konyratov; Kazakhstan
74 kg	Kim Hyeon-woo; South Korea	Hadi Alizadeh; Iran	Maxat Yerezhepov; Kazakhstan
74 kg	Kim Hyeon-woo; South Korea	Hadi Alizadeh; Iran	Tomohiro Inoue; Japan
84 kg	Rustam Assakalov; Uzbekistan	Park Jin-sung; South Korea	Azat Beishebekov; Kyrgyzstan
84 kg	Rustam Assakalov; Uzbekistan	Park Jin-sung; South Korea	Taleb Nematpour; Iran
96 kg	An Chang-gun; South Korea	Yerulan Iskakov; Kazakhstan	Yahia Abutabeekh; Jordan
96 kg	An Chang-gun; South Korea	Yerulan Iskakov; Kazakhstan	Davoud Gilneirang; Iran
120 kg	Nurmakhan Tinaliyev; Kazakhstan	Nie Xiaoming; China	Mohammed Sabah; Iraq
120 kg	Nurmakhan Tinaliyev; Kazakhstan	Nie Xiaoming; China	Murat Ramonov; Kyrgyzstan

=== Women's freestyle ===
Event	Gold	Silver	Bronze
48 kg	Pak Yong-mi; North Korea	Vũ Thị Hằng; Vietnam	Mikhrniso Nurmatova; Kyrgyzstan
48 kg	Pak Yong-mi; North Korea	Vũ Thị Hằng; Vietnam	Ayano Suzuki; Japan
51 kg	Tatyana Amanzhol; Kazakhstan	Liu Haiping; China	Vinesh Phogat; India
51 kg	Tatyana Amanzhol; Kazakhstan	Liu Haiping; China	So Sim-hyang; North Korea
55 kg	Yang Senlian; China	Kanako Murata; Japan	Han Kum-ok; North Korea
55 kg	Yang Senlian; China	Kanako Murata; Japan	Babita Kumari; India
59 kg	Chihiro Kumabe; Japan	Tungalagiin Mönkhtuyaa; Mongolia	Aisuluu Tynybekova; Kyrgyzstan
59 kg	Chihiro Kumabe; Japan	Tungalagiin Mönkhtuyaa; Mongolia	Li Haiyan; China
63 kg	Xiluo Zhuoma; China	Yurika Ito; Japan	Geetika Jakhar; India
63 kg	Xiluo Zhuoma; China	Yurika Ito; Japan	Sharkhüügiin Tümentsetseg; Mongolia
67 kg	Ochirbatyn Nasanburmaa; Mongolia	Navjot Kaur; India	Han Hye-kyung; South Korea
67 kg	Ochirbatyn Nasanburmaa; Mongolia	Navjot Kaur; India	Jing Ruixue; China
72 kg	Hiroe Suzuki; Japan	Badrakhyn Odonchimeg; Mongolia	Wang Juan; China
72 kg	Hiroe Suzuki; Japan	Badrakhyn Odonchimeg; Mongolia	Jyoti; India

== Participating nations ==
237 competitors from 20 nations competed.

- China (21)
- Chinese Taipei (10)
- India (21)
- Iran (14)
- Iraq (6)
- Japan (21)
- Jordan (3)
- Kazakhstan (21)
- Kyrgyzstan (18)
- Mongolia (14)
- North Korea (7)
- Qatar (2)
- South Korea (21)
- Sri Lanka (3)
- Syria (8)
- Tajikistan (10)
- Thailand (6)
- Turkmenistan (7)
- Uzbekistan (15)
- Vietnam (9)
