= Gustavo Balart =

Cuban mixed martial artist

- Born: Gustavo Eddy Balart Marin; February 10, 1987 (age 39); Santiago de Cuba, Cuba
- Other names: El Gladiador
- Height: 4 ft 11 in (1.50 m)
- Weight: 124 lb (56 kg)
- Division: Strawweight (2019–present); Flyweight (2017–2019)
- Reach: 56 in (142 cm)
- Style: Wrestling
- Stance: Orthodox
- Fighting out of: Santiago de Cuba, Cuba
- Team: American Top Team Kendall
- Trainer: Pedro Val
- Wrestling: Olympian Greco-Roman Wrestling
- Years active: 2015–present

Mixed martial arts record
- Total: 17
- Wins: 12
- By knockout: 1
- By decision: 11
- Losses: 5
- By knockout: 2
- By submission: 1
- By decision: 2

Other information
- Mixed martial arts record from Sherdog

Gustavo Eddy Balart Marin (born February 10, 1987) is a Cuban mixed martial artist competing in the Strawweight division. He has previously competed for ONE Championship and Titan Fighting Championships (Titan FC).

Balart is also a former amateur Greco-Roman wrestler who competed in the men's featherweight category.

== Greco-Roman wrestling career ==
Gustavo Balart defeated Venezuela's Jorge Cardozo for the gold medal in his division at the 2011 Pan American Games in Guadalajara, Mexico.

Balart represented Cuba at the 2012 Summer Olympics in London, where he competed in the men's 55 kg class. He defeated Turkey's Ayhan Karakuş in the preliminary round of sixteen, before losing the quarterfinal match to South Korea's Choi Gyu-Jin, with a three-set technical score (0–1, 2–0, 0–1), and a classification point score of 1–3.

== Mixed martial arts career ==
Balart made his professional mixed martial arts debut on August 1, 2015.

=== ONE Championship ===
Gustavo Balart made his ONE Championship debut against Tatsumitsu Wada at ONE: Roots of Honor in the ONE Flyweight World Grand Prix Quarterfinal on April 12, 2019. He lost by unanimous decision in controversial fashion.

In his next bout, Balart faced Chan Rothana at ONE: Dreams of Gold on August 16, 2019. He lost by unanimous decision.

Balart was scheduled to face Robin Catalan at ONE: Masters of Fate on November 8, 2019. Balart lost the fight by second-round knockout via head kick.

Gustavo Balart was able to pick up his first promotional victory with a unanimous decision over Ryuto Sawada at ONE: Battleground on July 30, 2021.

He picked up his second consecutive win with another unanimous decision over former Shooto Flyweight Champion and ONE Strawweight Champion Yosuke Saruta at ONE 156 on April 22, 2022.

Balart faced former ONE Strawweight World Champion Alex Silva on October 21, 2022, at ONE 162. At the weigh-ins, Balart failed the hydration test and was forced to take catchweight of 130.75 lbs, 5.75 lbs over the strawweight limit. He won the fight via split decision.

Balart faced Hiroba Minowa on January 28, 2024, at ONE 165. He won the fight via split decision.

Balart faced Jarred Brooks for the interim ONE Strawweight World Championship on August 3, 2024, at ONE Fight Night 24. At the weigh-ins, Balart came in at 126 lb (after coming in at 131.75 lb in his first attempt), 1 pounds over the limit. As a result, Balart was fined 25% of his purse and was ineligible for the title, only Brooks was eligible to win the title. He lost the fight via a rear-naked choke in round one.

== Bare-knuckle boxing ==
Balart made his debut with Bare Knuckle Fighting Championship against Alexander Gutierrez on June 4, 2026 at BKFC Fight Night 39. He won the fight by split decision.

Balart was scheduled to face Justyn Martinez on January 23, 2027 at BKFSea 1. For undisclosed reasons, the bout was removed from the card.

== Mixed martial arts record ==
Professional record breakdown
17 matches	12 wins	5 losses
By knockout	1	2
By submission	0	1
By decision	11	2

Res.	Record	Opponent	Method	Event	Date	Round	Time	Location	Notes
Loss	12–5	Jarred Brooks	Submission (rear-naked choke)	ONE Fight Night 24	August 3, 2024	1	4:39	Bangkok, Thailand	For the interim ONE Strawweight Championship (125 lb). Balart missed weight (126 lb) and was ineligible for the title.
Win	12–4	Hiroba Minowa	Decision (split)	ONE 165	January 28, 2024	3	5:00	Tokyo, Japan	
Win	11–4	Alex Silva	Decision (split)	ONE 162	October 21, 2022	3	5:00	Kuala Lumpur, Malaysia	Catchweight (130.75 lb) bout; Balart missed weight.
Win	10–4	Yosuke Saruta	Decision (unanimous)	ONE 156	April 22, 2022	3	5:00	Kallang, Singapore	
Win	9–4	Ryuto Sawada	Decision (unanimous)	ONE: Battleground	July 30, 2021	3	5:00	Kallang, Singapore	
Loss	8–4	Robin Catalan	KO (head kick)	ONE: Masters of Fate	November 8, 2019	2	4:43	Pasay, Philippines	Return to Flyweight.
Loss	8–3	Chan Rothana	Decision (unanimous)	ONE: Dreams of Gold	August 16, 2019	3	5:00	Bangkok, Thailand	
Loss	8–2	Tatsumitsu Wada	Decision (unanimous)	ONE: Roots of Honor	April 12, 2019	3	5:00	Pasay, Philippines	Bantamweight debut. ONE Flyweight World Grand Prix Quarterfinal.
Win	8–1	Wascar Cruz	KO (punches)	Titan FC 52: Soares vs. Uruguai	January 25, 2019	1	0:20	Fort Lauderdale, Florida, United States	
Win	7–1	Victor Dias	Decision (unanimous)	Titan FC 50: Manfio vs. Outlaw	June 29, 2018	3	5:00	Fort Lauderdale, Florida, United States	
Loss	6–1	Juan Puerta	KO (flying knee)	Titan FC 48: Torres vs. Orellano	February 16, 2018	3	2:14	Fort Lauderdale, Florida, United States	
Win	6–0	Bruno Korea	Decision (split)	Titan FC 47: Yusuff vs. Gomez	December 15, 2017	3	5:00	Fort Lauderdale, Florida, United States	
Win	5–0	Marcelo Castaneda	Decision (unanimous)	Titan FC 46: Torres vs. DeJesus	November 17, 2017	3	5:00	Pembroke Pines, Florida, United States	
Win	4–0	Jorge Calvo Martin	Decision (split)	Titan FC 45: Araujo vs. Capitulino	August 18, 2017	3	5:00	Pembroke Pines, Florida, United States	
Win	3–0	Dez Moore	Decision (unanimous)	Titan FC 44: Torres vs. Sharipov	May 19, 2017	3	5:00	Pembroke Pines, Florida, United States	
Win	2–0	Carlos Hernandez	Decision (unanimous)	Titan FC 43: Torres vs. Nobre	January 21, 2017	3	5:00	Coral Gables, Florida, United States	
Win	1–0	Mauricio Gomez Oquendo	Decision (unanimous)	Latin Fighting Championship 7	August 1, 2015	3	5:00	Bogotá, Colombia	Flyweight debut.

== Bare knuckle boxing record ==
Professional record breakdown
1 match	1 win	0 losses
By decision	1	0

Res.	Record	Opponent	Method	Event	Date	Round	Time	Location	Notes
Win	1–0	Alexander Gutierrez	Decision (split)	BKFC Fight Night Hollywood: Lane vs. Henry	June 6, 2026	5	2:00	Hollywood, Florida, United States	
