= Rovshan Bayramov =

Azerbaijani wrestler (born 1987)

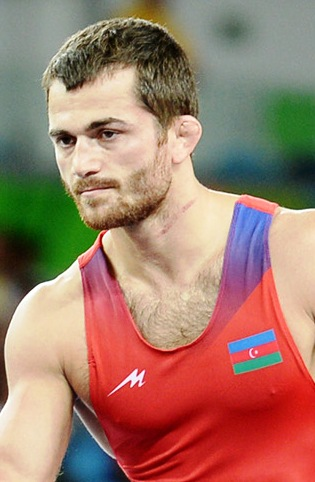
- Bayramov during the 2016 Summer Olympics

Personal information
- Born: 7 May 1987 (age 39) Baku, Azerbaijani SSR
Medal record
Men's Greco-Roman wrestling
Representing Azerbaijan
Olympic Games
Silver medal – second place	2008 Beijing	55 kg
Silver medal – second place	2012 London	55 kg
World Championships
Gold medal – first place	2011 Istanbul	55 kg
Silver medal – second place	2006 Guangzhou	55 kg
Silver medal – second place	2015 Las Vegas	59 kg
Bronze medal – third place	2009 Herning	55 kg
European Championships
Gold medal – first place	2007 Sofia	55 kg
Gold medal – first place	2008 Tampere	55 kg
Bronze medal – third place	2006 Moscow	55 kg
World Cup
Gold medal – first place	2015 Tehran	59 kg

Rovshan Bayramov (Azerbaijani: Rövşən Bayramov; born 7 May 1987, Baku, Azerbaijani SSR) is an Azerbaijani wrestler. He is a European and world champion in Greco-Roman wrestling and a two-time Olympic silver medalist.

In the 2011 World Wrestling Championship held in Istanbul, he became a world champion, adding a gold medal to the silver and bronze medals he won at previous world championships. In addition, Bayramov holds two European titles.

== 2008 Beijing Olympics ==
In the 2008 Beijing Olympics, Bayramov successfully reached the final having beaten Mostafa Mohamed (Egypt), Yagnier Hernández (Cuba), Roman Amoyan (Armenia), but lost to Nazyr Mankiev from Russia.

== 2012 London Olympics ==
In the 2012 London Olympics having beaten Mingiyan Semenov (Russia), Spenser Mango (USA), Li Shujin (China) and Choi Gyu-Jin (South Korea), Bayramov lost in the final against Hamid Sourian (Iran) and obtained his second silver Olympic medal in a row.
