= Dmytro Tsymbaliuk =

Ukrainian Greco-Roman wrestler

Personal information
- Nationality: Ukrainian
- Born: 19 December 1991 (age 34) Zaporizhia, Ukraine
- Height: 1.65 m (5 ft 5 in)
- Weight: 63 kg (139 lb)

Sport
- Sport: Wrestling
- Event: Greco-Roman
- Club: Sports Club Zaporizhia
- Coached by: Ivan Tsepin, Sergey Gorochovir
Medal record
Men's Greco-Roman wrestling
Representing Ukraine
European Championships
Bronze medal – third place	2016 Riga	59 kg

Dmytro Tsymbaliuk (Ukrainian: Дмитро Цимбалюк; born 19 December 1991 in Zaporizhia) is an amateur Ukrainian Greco-Roman wrestler. He won a bronze medal for his category at the 2016 European Wrestling Championships in Riga.
