= 2013 World Wrestling Championships =

International Wrestling Tournament

- Host city: Budapest, Hungary
- Dates: 16–22 September 2013
- Stadium: László Papp Budapest Sports Arena

Champions
- Freestyle: Iran
- Greco-Roman: Russia
- Women: Japan

The 2013 World Wrestling Championships was the 9th edition of World Wrestling Championships of combined events and were held from September 16 to 22 in Budapest, Hungary.

== Medal table ==
Rank	Nation	Gold	Silver	Bronze	Total
1	Russia	3	4	4	11
2	Iran	3	1	2	6
3	Japan	3	0	1	4
4	South Korea	2	1	1	4
4	Ukraine	2	1	1	4
6	China	2	0	1	3
7	Bulgaria	1	2	0	3
8	Armenia	1	1	2	4
9	Hungary	1	0	5	6
10	United States	1	0	3	4
11	North Korea	1	0	1	2
12	Estonia	1	0	0	1
13	Mongolia	0	2	4	6
14	Azerbaijan	0	2	2	4
15	Cuba	0	2	0	2
16	Turkey	0	1	3	4
17	India	0	1	2	3
18	Canada	0	1	1	2
18	Sweden	0	1	1	2
20	Venezuela	0	1	0	1
21	Belarus	0	0	2	2
21	Kazakhstan	0	0	2	2
21	Uzbekistan	0	0	2	2
24	Georgia	0	0	1	1
24	Germany	0	0	1	1
Totals (25 entries)		21	21	42	84

== Team ranking ==
Rank	Men's freestyle		Men's Greco-Roman		Women's freestyle	
Rank	Team	Points	Team	Points	Team	Points
1	Iran	46	Russia	44	Japan	48
2	Russia	44	South Korea	37	Mongolia	47
3	Georgia	29	Hungary	31	United States	37
4	Ukraine	27	Armenia	28	China	34
5	United States	25	Azerbaijan	27	Ukraine	29
6	India	23	Kazakhstan	21	Russia	24
7	Cuba	19	Turkey	20	Canada	21
8	Mongolia	19	Iran	19	Hungary	18
9	Armenia	18	Finland	15	Bulgaria	15
10	Turkey	18	United States	14	Kazakhstan	12

== Medal summary ==
=== Men's freestyle ===
Event	Gold	Silver	Bronze
55 kg	Hassan Rahimi; Iran	Amit Kumar Dahiya; India	Sezar Akgül; Turkey
55 kg	Hassan Rahimi; Iran	Amit Kumar Dahiya; India	Nariman Israpilov; Russia
60 kg	Bekkhan Goygereev; Russia	Vladimir Dubov; Bulgaria	Bajrang Punia; India
60 kg	Bekkhan Goygereev; Russia	Vladimir Dubov; Bulgaria	Masoud Esmaeilpour; Iran
66 kg	David Safaryan; Armenia	Liván López; Cuba	Magomed Kurbanaliev; Russia
66 kg	David Safaryan; Armenia	Liván López; Cuba	Ganzorigiin Mandakhnaran; Mongolia
74 kg	Jordan Burroughs; United States	Ezzatollah Akbari; Iran	Ali Shabanau; Belarus
74 kg	Jordan Burroughs; United States	Ezzatollah Akbari; Iran	Rashid Kurbanov; Uzbekistan
84 kg	Ibragim Aldatov; Ukraine	Reineris Salas; Cuba	István Veréb; Hungary
84 kg	Ibragim Aldatov; Ukraine	Reineris Salas; Cuba	Ehsan Lashgari; Iran
96 kg	Reza Yazdani; Iran	Khetag Gazyumov; Azerbaijan	Anzor Boltukaev; Russia
96 kg	Reza Yazdani; Iran	Khetag Gazyumov; Azerbaijan	Pavlo Oliynyk; Ukraine
120 kg	Khadzhimurat Gatsalov; Russia	Alen Zaseyev; Ukraine	Geno Petriashvili; Georgia
120 kg	Khadzhimurat Gatsalov; Russia	Alen Zaseyev; Ukraine	Taha Akgül; Turkey

=== Men's Greco-Roman ===
Event	Gold	Silver	Bronze
55 kg	Yun Won-chol; North Korea	Choi Gyu-jin; South Korea	Péter Módos; Hungary
55 kg	Yun Won-chol; North Korea	Choi Gyu-jin; South Korea	Roman Amoyan; Armenia
60 kg	Ivo Angelov; Bulgaria	Ivan Kuylakov; Russia	Woo Seung-jae; South Korea
60 kg	Ivo Angelov; Bulgaria	Ivan Kuylakov; Russia	Elmurat Tasmuradov; Uzbekistan
66 kg	Ryu Han-su; South Korea	Islambek Albiev; Russia	Sandeep Tulsi Yadav; India
66 kg	Ryu Han-su; South Korea	Islambek Albiev; Russia	Frank Stäbler; Germany
74 kg	Kim Hyeon-woo; South Korea	Roman Vlasov; Russia	Arsen Julfalakyan; Armenia
74 kg	Kim Hyeon-woo; South Korea	Roman Vlasov; Russia	Emrah Kuş; Turkey
84 kg	Taleb Nematpour; Iran	Saman Tahmasebi; Azerbaijan	Javid Hamzatau; Belarus
84 kg	Taleb Nematpour; Iran	Saman Tahmasebi; Azerbaijan	Viktor Lőrincz; Hungary
96 kg	Nikita Melnikov; Russia	Artur Aleksanyan; Armenia	Balázs Kiss; Hungary
96 kg	Nikita Melnikov; Russia	Artur Aleksanyan; Armenia	Shalva Gadabadze; Azerbaijan
120 kg	Heiki Nabi; Estonia	Rıza Kayaalp; Turkey	Nurmakhan Tinaliyev; Kazakhstan
120 kg	Heiki Nabi; Estonia	Rıza Kayaalp; Turkey	Johan Eurén; Sweden

=== Women's freestyle ===
Event	Gold	Silver	Bronze
48 kg	Eri Tosaka; Japan	Mayelis Caripá; Venezuela	Xu Cheng; China
48 kg	Eri Tosaka; Japan	Mayelis Caripá; Venezuela	Alyssa Lampe; United States
51 kg	Sun Yanan; China	Erdenechimegiin Sumiyaa; Mongolia	So Sim-hyang; North Korea
51 kg	Sun Yanan; China	Erdenechimegiin Sumiyaa; Mongolia	Jessica MacDonald; Canada
55 kg	Saori Yoshida; Japan	Sofia Mattsson; Sweden	Emese Barka; Hungary
55 kg	Saori Yoshida; Japan	Sofia Mattsson; Sweden	Valeria Koblova; Russia
59 kg	Marianna Sastin; Hungary	Taybe Yusein; Bulgaria	Tungalagiin Mönkhtuyaa; Mongolia
59 kg	Marianna Sastin; Hungary	Taybe Yusein; Bulgaria	Yuliya Ratkevich; Azerbaijan
63 kg	Kaori Icho; Japan	Soronzonboldyn Battsetseg; Mongolia	Yekaterina Larionova; Kazakhstan
63 kg	Kaori Icho; Japan	Soronzonboldyn Battsetseg; Mongolia	Elena Pirozhkova; United States
67 kg	Alina Stadnyk; Ukraine	Stacie Anaka; Canada	Ochirbatyn Nasanburmaa; Mongolia
67 kg	Alina Stadnyk; Ukraine	Stacie Anaka; Canada	Sara Dosho; Japan
72 kg	Zhang Fengliu; China	Natalia Vorobieva; Russia	Adeline Gray; United States
72 kg	Zhang Fengliu; China	Natalia Vorobieva; Russia	Ochirbatyn Burmaa; Mongolia

== Participating nations ==
681 competitors from 87 nations participated.

- Albania (2)
- Algeria (2)
- Argentina (3)
- Armenia (13)
- Australia (1)
- Austria (7)
- Azerbaijan (18)
- Belarus (21)
- Brazil (9)
- Bulgaria (20)
- Cameroon (2)
- Canada (14)
- Chad (1)
- China (21)
- Chinese Taipei (3)
- Colombia (9)
- Croatia (5)
- Cuba (11)
- Czech Republic (7)
- Denmark (2)
- Dominican Republic (6)
- Egypt (7)
- El Salvador (1)
- Estonia (6)
- Finland (5)
- France (7)
- Georgia (14)
- Germany (17)
- Great Britain (1)
- Greece (13)
- Guam (1)
- Guatemala (1)
- Guinea-Bissau (1)
- Honduras (4)
- Hungary (21)
- India (21)
- Iran (14)
- Iraq (2)
- Israel (4)
- Italy (4)
- Japan (21)
- Jordan (1)
- Kazakhstan (21)
- Kyrgyzstan (12)
- Latvia (5)
- Lithuania (6)
- Macedonia (2)
- Madagascar (2)
- Mauritius (1)
- Mexico (8)
- Moldova (14)
- Mongolia (14)
- Montenegro (1)
- Morocco (1)
- Netherlands (1)
- New Zealand (3)
- Nicaragua (1)
- North Korea (7)
- Norway (4)
- Palau (1)
- Panama (2)
- Peru (2)
- Poland (18)
- Portugal (1)
- Puerto Rico (4)
- Qatar (1)
- Romania (15)
- Russia (21)
- Senegal (3)
- Serbia (5)
- Slovakia (8)
- Slovenia (1)
- South Africa (4)
- South Korea (17)
- Spain (6)
- Sri Lanka (5)
- Sweden (10)
- Switzerland (3)
- Tajikistan (4)
- Tunisia (3)
- Turkey (20)
- Ukraine (21)
- Uruguay (1)
- United States (21)
- Uzbekistan (12)
- Venezuela (17)
- Vietnam (9)
