= Arsen Eraliev =

Kyrgyzstani Greco-Roman wrestler

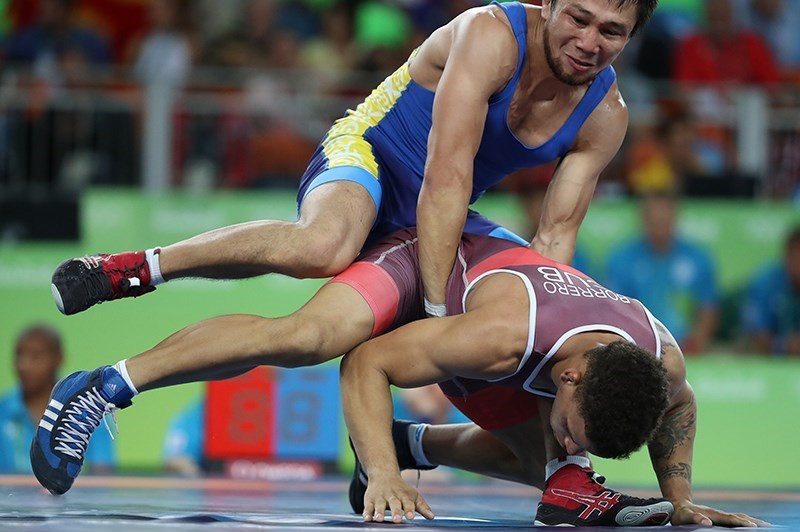
- Arsen Eraliev (blue suit) vs Ismael Borrero, Rio 2016

Personal information
- Nationality: Kyrgyzstan
- Born: 15 May 1990 (age 36) Frunze, Kirghizia, Soviet Union
- Height: 1.65 m (5 ft 5 in)
Medal record
Men's Greco-Roman wrestling
Representing Kyrgyzstan
Asian Championships
Bronze medal – third place	2015 Doha	59 kg
Bronze medal – third place	2014 New Delhi	60 kg
Gold medal – first place	2011 Tashkent	55 kg

Arsen Eraliev (born 15 May 1990 in Bishkek) is a Kyrgyzstani Greco-Roman wrestler. He competed in the Greco-Roman 55 kg event at the 2012 Summer Olympics; he was defeated in the 1/8 finals by Hamid Sourian and eliminated in the repechage round by Péter Módos.
