= Yun Won-chol =

North Korean Greco-Roman wrestler (born 1989)

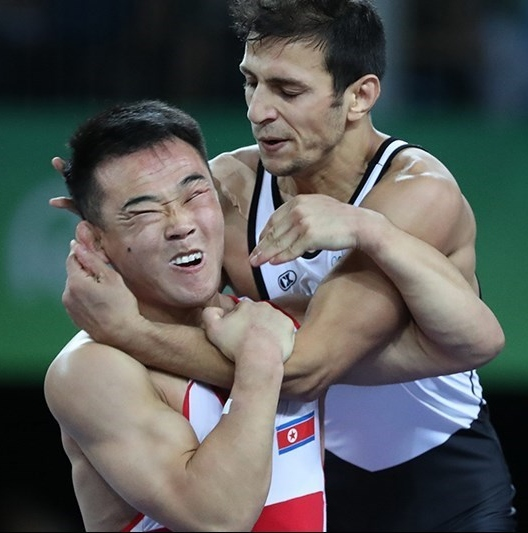
- Yun Won-chol (left) vs Haithem Mahmoud, Rio 2016

Personal information
- Nationality: North Korea
- Born: 3 July 1989 (age 37) North Pyongan, North Korea
- Height: 1.63 m (5 ft 4 in)
- Weight: 59 kg (130 lb)

Korean name
- Hangul: 윤원철
- Hanja: 尹元哲
- RR: Yun Woncheol
- MR: Yun Wŏnch'ŏl

Sport
- Sport: Wrestling
- Event: Greco-Roman
- Club: April 25 Sports Club
- Coached by: Choe Hak
Medal record
Men's Greco-Roman wrestling
Representing North Korea
World Championships
Gold medal – first place	2013 Budapest	55 kg
Bronze medal – third place	2015 Las Vegas	59 kg
Asian Games
Silver medal – second place	2014 Incheon	59 kg
Asian Championships
Bronze medal – third place	India 2013	55 kg
Bronze medal – third place	Astana 2014	59 kg

Yun Won-Chol (Korean pronunciation: [ju.nwʌn.tsʰʌl] or [jun] [wʌn.tsʰʌl]; born July 3, 1989, in North Pyongan) is an amateur North Korean Greco-Roman wrestler, who competed in the men's featherweight category. Yun represented North Korea at the 2012 Summer Olympics in London, where he competed in the men's 55 kg class. He received a bye for the preliminary round of sixteen match, before losing to South Korea's Choi Gyu-Jin, who was able to score three points in two straight periods, leaving Yun without a single point.

In 2013, Yun became the world champion after he defeated Choi in the final at Budapest.

He competed for North Korea at the 2016 Summer Olympics in Rio de Janeiro in the 59 kg division. He defeated Haithem Mahmoud Fahmy of Egypt in the first round. He was then defeated by Elmurat Tasmuradov of Uzbekistan in the quarterfinals. Yun was the flag bearer for North Korea during the closing ceremony.
