= Anders Nyblom =

Danish Greco-Roman wrestler

Personal information
- Nationality: Denmark
- Born: 26 November 1981 (age 44) Vaasa, Finland
- Height: 1.59 m (5 ft 2 1/2 in)
- Weight: 55 kg (121 lb)

Sport
- Sport: Wrestling
- Event: Greco-Roman
- Club: Herning Brydeklub (DEN)
- Coached by: Jaroslaw Pyzara

Anders Nyblom (born 26 November 1981) is a Danish amateur Greco-Roman wrestler, who competed in the featherweight division. He is the twin brother of two-time Olympian Håkan Nyblom.

Nyblom was born in Vaasa, Finland, and he moved to Ølgod, Denmark, with his family when he was young. He qualified for the 55-kg category at the 2008 Summer Olympics in Beijing, after placing eighth at the 2007 World Wrestling Championships in Baku, Azerbaijan. He was eliminated in the second round of the competition, after being defeated by South Korea's Park Eun-Chul, with a score of 1–8, at the end of two periods.

Nyblom is also a member of Herning Brydeklub in Herning, Denmark, being coached and trained by Polish-born Jaroslaw Pyzara.
