= Bayram Özdemir =

Turkish wrestler

Personal information
- Nationality: Turkish
- Born: 1 January 1976 (age 50) Istanbul, Turkey

Sport
- Sport: Wrestling

Bayram Özdemir (born 1 January 1976) is a Turkish wrestler. He competed in the men's Greco-Roman 48 kg at the 1996 Summer Olympics.
