= Ismael Borrero =

Cuban Greco-Roman wrestler

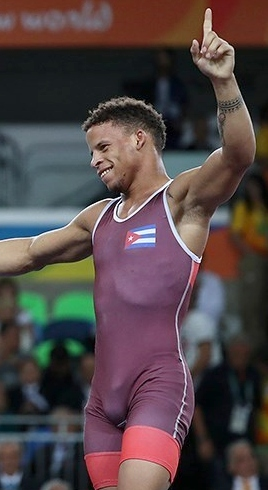
- Borrero at the 2016 Summer Olympics

Personal information
- Full name: Ismael Borrero Molina
- Born: January 6, 1992 (age 34) Santiago de Cuba, Cuba
- Height: 160 cm (5 ft 3 in)
- Weight: 67 kg (148 lb)

Sport
- Sport: Wrestling
- Weight class: 59,67 kg
- Event: Greco-Roman
- Club: Cerro Pelado, Havana
Medal record
Representing Cuba
Olympic Games
Gold medal – first place	2016 Rio de Janeiro	59 kg
World Championships
Gold medal – first place	2015 Las Vegas	59 kg
Gold medal – first place	2019 Nur-Sultan	67 kg
Pan American Games
Gold medal – first place	2019 Lima	67 kg
Central American and Caribbean Games
Gold medal – first place	2014 Veracruz	59 kg

Ismael Borrero Molina (born January 6, 1992) is a Greco-Roman wrestler from Cuba.

== Competitive Career ==
He competed in the 59 kg (or 60 kg) weight category at the 2013, 2014 and 2015 World Championships and won gold medals in 2015 and 2019. Borrero won three consecutive Pan American Championships in 2012–2014 and a gold medal at the 2016 Olympics.

He represented Cuba at the 2020 Summer Olympics held in Tokyo, Japan. He competed in the 67 kg event.

He is a student at the Universidad de las Ciencias de la Cultura Física y el Deporte in Havana.

== Coaching career ==
In 2022, Borrero moved to Colorado Springs to become a Greco-Roman for the USA National Greco-Roman team.
