= Elmurat Tasmuradov =

Uzbekistani Olympic wrestler (born 1991)

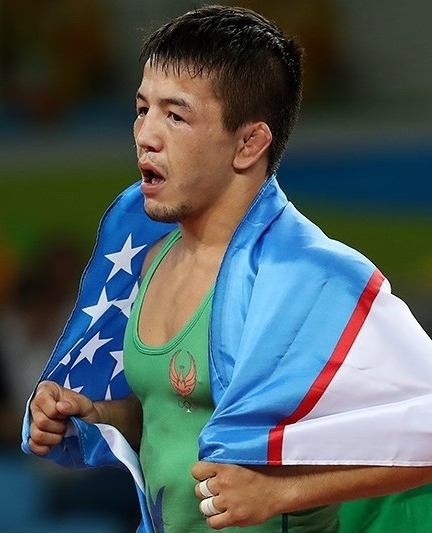
- Tasmuradov at the 2016 Olympics

Personal information
- Full name: Elmurat Zulypkarovich Tasmuradov
- Born: 12 December 1991 (age 34) Tashkent Region, Uzbekistan
- Height: 1.60 m (5 ft 3 in)

Sport
- Sport: Wrestling
- Event: Greco-Roman
- Club: Dynamo Tashkent
- Coached by: Olimjon Kurbanov; Kudratov Rustam
Medal record
Men's Greco-Roman wrestling
Representing Uzbekistan
Olympic Games
Bronze medal – third place	2016 Rio de Janeiro	59 kg
World Championships
Bronze medal – third place	2013 Budapest	60 kg
Bronze medal – third place	2014 Tashkent	59 kg
Silver medal – second place	2018 Budapest	63 kg
Asian Championships
Silver medal – second place	2012 Gumi	55 kg
Gold medal – first place	2013 New Delhi	60 kg
Gold medal – first place	2014 Astana	59 kg
Gold medal – first place	2015 Doha	59 kg
Gold medal – first place	2018 Bishkek	63 kg
Silver medal – second place	2019 Xian	63 kg
Gold medal – first place	2020 New Delhi	63 kg

Elmurat Zulypkarovich Tasmuradov (Kazakh: Елмұрат Зұлыпқарұлы Тасмұратов born 12 December 1991) is an Uzbekistani Kazakh Greco-Roman wrestler. He competed in the 55 kg event at the 2012 Summer Olympics and was eliminated in the 1/8 finals by Péter Módos. He won a bronze medal in the 59 kg division at the 2016 Olympics. He won a gold medal four times at the Asian Championship (2013, 2014, 2015 and 2018) and a silver medal (2012).
