= Venelin Venkov =

Bulgarian Greco-Roman wrestler

Personal information
- Nationality: Bulgaria
- Born: 21 April 1982 (age 44) Oryahovo, Vratsa, Bulgaria
- Height: 1.63 m (5 ft 4 in)
- Weight: 55 kg (121 lb)

Sport
- Sport: Wrestling
- Event: Greco-Roman
- Club: Slavia Litex
- Coached by: Bratan Tzenov
Medal record
Men's Greco-Roman wrestling
Representing Bulgaria
European Championships
Silver medal – second place	2006 Moscow	55 kg

Venelin Venkov (Bulgarian: Венелин Венков; born April 21, 1982, in Oryahovo, Vratsa) is an amateur Bulgarian Greco-Roman wrestler, who played for the men's featherweight category. He won a silver medal for his division at the 2006 European Wrestling Championships in Moscow, Russia, losing out to Armenia's Roman Amoyan. He is also a member of Slavia Litex Wrestling Club in Sofia, and is coached and trained by Bratan Tzenov.

Venkov represented Bulgaria at the 2008 Summer Olympics in Beijing, where he competed for the men's 55 kg class. Unfortunately, he lost the qualifying round match by a fall (a score of 0–5) to Iran's Hamid Sourian.
