= Jiao Huafeng =

Chinese wrestler (born 1981)

Jiao Huafeng (Chinese: 焦华锋), born September 24, 1981, in Shandong is a male Chinese Greco-Roman wrestler who competed at the 2008 Summer Olympics as a featherweight.

Among his achievements, Huafeng's personal best was coming in first place at the 2006 Asian Games.
