= Jani Haapamäki =

Finnish wrestler (born 1982)

Personal information
- Full name: Jani Haapamäki
- Citizenship: (Finland)
- Born: 15 May 1982 (age 44) Kauhajoki, Finland
- Height: 1.65 m (5 ft 5 in)
- Weight: 63 kg (139 lb)

Sport
- Country: (Finland)
- Sport: Wrestling
- Event: Greco-Roman
- Club: Kauhajoen Karhu
- Team: Finnish National Team
- Turned pro: 2004
- Coached by: Hannu Vuorenmaa, Reijo Haaparanta (junior years); Juha Virtanen (since 2006)
Medal record
Representing Finland
Men's Greco-Roman wrestling
European Wrestling Championships
Gold medal – first place	Vilnius 2009	55 kg

Jani Haapamäki (born 15 May 1982 in Kauhajoki) is a Finnish wrestler (Greco-Roman). He won a gold medal at the 2009 European Wrestling Championships in Greco-Roman wrestling at the 55 kg event. Haapamäki represents the Kauhajoen Karhu (Eng. Kauhajoki Bears) sportsclub and is coached by wrestler Juha Virtanen.

== Career ==
Haapamäki has been wrestling since 1987. In his junior years, he was coached by Hannu Vuorenmaa and Reijo Haaparanta. In 2004 Haapamäki started internationally as a senior. The bantamweight failed twice to qualify for the Olympic Games in Athens. At the European Championships in Haparanda in the same year, he unexpectedly finished fifth. In the following tournaments, however, he always occupied a place in the lower rankings. It was not until 2008 that he was able to get back into the top ten at the European Championships in Tampere with 5th place. However, he again failed to qualify for the 2008 Summer Olympics.

At the 2009 European Wrestling Championships in Vilnius, he made it to the finals after defeating Bekchan Mankijew from Russia, where he defeated the Poles Mariusz Łoś on points. In the following time he could no longer call this performance up to this extent. He finished eighth at the 2009 World Cup in Herning, and seventh a year later in Moscow.

Haapamäki has been wrestling for the German Bundesliga club SV Germania Weingarten since 2010. Before that he was for SV Siegfried Hallbergmoos.

== Achievements and results ==
- 2004, 5th place, EM in Haparanda, GR, up to 55 kg, after victories over Sergei Skrypka, Germany and Tibor Olah, Hungary and a defeat against Artiom Kiouregkian, Greece
- 2005, 25th place, World Championships in Budapest, GR, up to 55 kg, after a defeat against Anders Nyblom, Denmark
- 2006, 15th place, EM in Moscow, GR, up to 55 kg, after a defeat against Artiom Kiourengian
- 2006, 21st place, World Championships in Guangzhou, GR, up to 55 kg, after a defeat against Jerbol Konyratow, Kyrgyzstan
- 2008, 5th place, EM in Tampere, GR, up to 55 kg, after victories over Huseyin Ayguen, Turkey and Iwan Gusow and defeats against Rövşən Bayramov, Azerbaijan and Peter Modos, Hungary
- 2009, 1st place, EM in Vilnius, GR, up to 55 kg, after victories over Roberto Pira, Italy, Lascha Gogitadze, Georgia, Maxim Katscharski, Belarus, Bekchan Mankijew, Russia and Mariusz Łoś, Poland
- 2009, 8th place, World Championships in Herning, GR, up to 55 kg, after victories over Godertsi Dawitadse, Georgia and Anders Rønningen, Norway and a defeat against Choi Gyu-jin, South Korea
- 2010, 7th place, World Championships in Moscow, GR, up to 55 kg, after victories over Federico Manea, Italy, Ferhat Tekin, Turkey and Lascha Gogitadze and defeats against Hamid Soryan, Iran and Wenelin Wenkow, Bulgaria
- 2011, 25th place, World Championships in Istanbul, GR, up to 55 kg, after a defeat against Yun Won-chol, North Korea
- 2013, 24th place, World Championships in Budapest, GR, up to 55 kg

=== Finnish championships ===
- 2001, 6th place, FS, up to 60 kg, u. a. behind Marko Kaarto and Jouni Rosenlöf
- 2002, 4th place, GR, up to 60 kg, behind Marko Isokoski, Janne Kinnunen and Terho Kettunen
- 2004, 1st place, GR, up to 55 kg, ahead of Petri Isokoski and Teemu Mattila
- 2005, 1st place, FS, up to 60 kg, ahead of Jukka Hyytiäinen and Jarmo Hyytiäinen
- 2007, 3rd place, GR, up to 55 kg, behind Ville Käki and Teemu Mattila
- 2008, 1st place, GR, up to 55 kg, ahead of Fazel Ahmadi and Ville Käki
- 2009, 1st place, GR, up to 55 kg, ahead of Niko Ohukainen and Fatos Durmishi
