= Elgin Loren Elwais =

Palauan wrestler

Elgin Loren Elwais (born March 5, 1985) is a Palauan wrestler. Elwais participated in his first Olympic Games at the 2008 Summer Olympics in Beijing, China. Elwais stands out from past Palauan Olympians by being the first sportsperson from his country to qualify for the Olympics based on his own merit.

Elwais was the official flag bearer for the Palau Olympic delegation at the 2008 Summer Olympics Opening Ceremony in Beijing on August 8, 2008. He competed in the 55kg class in Greco-Roman wrestling, losing his only match to Hamid Sourian of Iran.

Elwais lives in Susanville, California.
