= Lindsey Durlacher =

American Greco-Roman wrestler (1974–2011)

Personal information
- Born: September 14, 1974 Evanston, Illinois, U.S.
- Died: June 4, 2011 (aged 36) Denver, Colorado, U.S.

Sport
- Country: United States
- Sport: Wrestling
- Events: Greco-Roman and Folkstyle
- College team: Illinois
- Team: USA
Medal record
Men's Greco-Roman wrestling
Representing the United States
World Championships
Bronze medal – third place	2006 Guangzhou	55 kg
Pan American Games
Silver medal – second place	2003 Santo Domingo	55 kg
Silver medal – second place	2007 Rio de Janeiro	60 kg
Maccabiah Games
Gold medal – first place	1993 Tel Aviv
Gold medal – first place	1997 Tel Aviv
Gold medal – first place	2001 Jerusalem
Collegiate Wrestling
Representing the Illinois Fighting Illini
NCAA Division I Championships
Silver medal – second place	1997 Cedar Falls	118 lb

Lindsey Durlacher (September 14, 1974 – June 4, 2011) was an American Greco-Roman wrestler, mixed martial arts fighter, and judo athlete whose career highlight was a bronze medal at the 2006 World Championships in Greco-Roman at 55 kg. Durlacher was also a member of the 2007 United States Greco-Roman World Champion Team. As a collegiate wrestler, he was a two-time NCAA All-American at Illinois.

== Early life ==
Durlacher was Jewish, and was born in Evanston, Illinois. He attended Riley Elementary School in Arlington Heights, Illinois, and Cooper Middle School in Buffalo Grove.

== Wrestling career ==
He was a graduate of Buffalo Grove High School in Buffalo Grove, Illinois, going 44–0–1 in his senior year and winning a state title. He later coached and mentored students at Buffalo Grove. He was a two-time All-American at the University of Illinois.

His career highlight was a bronze medal at the 2006 World Championships at 121 pounds. Durlacher was also the 1991 Wisconsin state champion while attending Wayland Academy, second in the 1991 Junior Nationals, 1992 Illinois high school state champion, 1993 Maccabiah Games champion, third in the 1994–95 University Nationals, second in the 1996–97 University Nationals, second in the 1997 NCAA Championships, 1997 Maccabiah Games champion, 2001 Maccabiah Games champion, second in the 2002 and 2003 U.S. Nationals, silver medalist in the 2003 Pan American Games, second in the 2004 and 2005 U.S. Nationals, 2005 Maccabiah Games champion, second in the 2007 U.S. Nationals, silver medalist in the 2007 Pan American Games, a member of the United States Greco-Roman 2007 World Champion Team, second in the 2007 and 2008 U.S. Nationals, and third in the 2009 U.S. Nationals.

Durlacher was also assistant coach at the University of Illinois, Northwestern, Northern Illinois University, and the U.S. Naval Academy.

== Mixed martial arts career ==
Durlacher made his MMA debut on May 18, 2002 against Miguel Torres, who had a 19-0 record at the time, all finishes, and would go on to become WEC Bantamweight Champion. Durlacher lost by unanimous decision after a tough fight that went to a decision, the first of Torres' career. Durlacher's second fight was on November 9, 2002, defeating Gjermund Larsen by unanimous decision. His third and final fight was on October 15, 2005, defeating Richard Hess by TKO in the first round.

== Judo career ==
At the Maccabiah Games in 2009, Durlacher was the flag bearer for the US team and competed in judo at 60 kg. Durlacher lost his opening match to eventual champion Yoav Shemesh (ISR) by ippon. In the bronze medal match, Durlacher lost by ippon to Felipe Kitadai (BRA), a fifth-place finisher at the 2008 Junior World Championships and future Olympic bronze medalist.

== Death ==
Durlacher suffered a broken sternum in a snowmobile accident in February 2011. Durlacher had surgery for the injury in June 2011. He died at the age of 36 in his sleep on June 4, 2011, three days after his surgery, at his home in Denver, Colorado.

== Hall of Fame ==
He is a member of the Illinois Wrestling Coaches and Officials Association Hall of Fame. In October 2016, Lindsey was inducted into the Greco-Roman Wrestling Hall of Fame in a ceremony in Minneapolis, MN.

== Mixed martial arts record ==
Res.	Record	Opponent	Method	Event	Date	Round	Time	Location	Notes
Win	2–1	Richard Hess	TKO (Submission to Punches)	SF 13 - Rocky Mountain Sportfight	October 15, 2005	1	2:46	Denver, Colorado, United States	
Win	1–1	Gjermund Larsen	Decision (Unanimous)	MIFTW - Prove Yourself	November 9, 2002	2	0:00	Colorado Springs, Colorado, United States	
Loss	0-1	Miguel Torres	Decision (Unanimous)	IHC 4 - Armageddon	May 18, 2002	3	5:00	Hammond, Indiana, United States	

== See also ==
- List of select Jewish wrestlers
