= Nazyr Mankiev =

Olympic wrestler (born 1985)

Medal record

Men's Greco-Roman wrestling

Representing Russia

Olympic Games
Gold medal – first place	2008 Beijing	55 kg

World Championships
Bronze medal – third place	2007 Baku	55 kg
Bronze medal – third place	2010 Moscow	55 kg

European Championships
Silver medal – second place	2010 Baku	55 kg

Nazyr Yunuzovich Mankiev (Russian: Назир Юнузович Манкиев) (born January 27, 1985, in Surkhakhi, Ingushetia, Soviet Union) is an Ingush wrestler who won a gold medal at the 2008 Summer Olympics in Greco-Roman wrestling. Resident of Krasnoyarsk.
