= Park Eun-chul =

South Korean Greco-Roman wrestler

Personal information
- Born: January 18, 1981 (age 45)
Medal record
Men's Greco-Roman wrestling
Representing South Korea
Olympic Games
Bronze medal – third place	2008 Beijing	55 kg
World Championships
Silver medal – second place	2005 Budapest	55 kg
Silver medal – second place	2007 Baku	55 kg

Park Eun-Chul (Korean: 박은철; Hanja: 朴殷哲; pronounced [pak̚ ɯn.tɕʰʌl] or [pa.ɡɯn.tɕʰʌl]; born January 18, 1981, in Cheongju, North Chungcheong Province) is a South Korean wrestler who won the Bronze medal in the Men's Greco-Roman 55kg in the 2008 Summer Olympics in Beijing. He is also a Three-time world championship medalist, receiving Bronze in 2006, and Silver in 2005 and 2007. He lost both his world championship finals matches to Hamid Sourian. Park eventually beat Sourian in the Bronze medal match at the 2008 Summer Olympics.
