= Choi Gyu-jin (wrestler) =

South Korean wrestler (born 1985)

Medal record

Men's Greco-Roman wrestling

Representing South Korea

World Championships
| Silver medal – second place | 2010 Moscow | 55 kg |
| Silver medal – second place | 2013 Budapest | 55 kg |

Asian Championships
| Gold medal – first place | 2010 New Delhi | 55 kg |
| Gold medal – first place | 2013 New Delhi | 55 kg |

Choi Gyu-jin (Korean: 최규진, born June 28, 1985) is a male wrestler from South Korea. He won 2013 world wrestling contest.
