= Virgil Munteanu =

Romanian Greco-Roman wrestler

Personal information
- Nationality: Romania
- Born: 10 July 1988 (age 38) Drobeta-Turnu Severin, Romania
- Height: 1.50 m (4 ft 11 in)
- Weight: 55 kg (121 lb)

Sport
- Sport: Wrestling
- Event: Greco-Roman
- Club: CS Alro Slatina
- Coached by: Dinu Obrucea
Medal record
Men's Greco-Roman wrestling
Representing Romania
European Championships
| Bronze medal – third place | 2008 Tampere | 55 kg |

Virgil Munteanu (born July 10, 1988 in Drobeta-Turnu Severin) is an amateur Romanian Greco-Roman wrestler, who played for the men's featherweight category. He won the bronze medal for his division at the 2008 European Wrestling Championships in Tampere, Finland. He is also a member of CS Alro Slatina, and is coached and trained by Dinu Obrucea.

Munteanu represented Romania at the 2008 Summer Olympics in Beijing, where he competed for the men's 55 kg class. He received a bye for the second preliminary round, before losing out to U.S. wrestler and former world university champion Spenser Mango, with a technical score of 3–6.
