= Péter Módos =

Hungarian wrestler (born 1987)

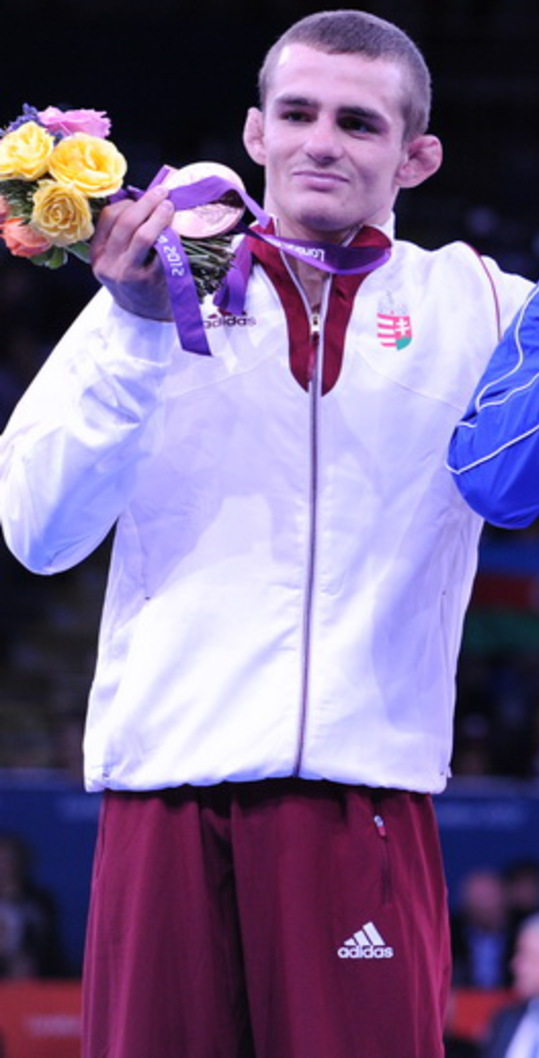
- Módos at the 2012 Summer Olympics

Personal information
- Nationality: Hungary
- Born: 17 December 1987 (age 38) Szigetvár, Hungary
- Height: 170 cm (5 ft 7 in)

Sport
- Country: Hungary
- Sport: Wrestling
- Weight class: 55 kg
- Event: Greco-Roman
Medal record
Men's Greco-Roman wrestling
Representing Hungary
Olympic Games
| Bronze medal – third place | 2012 London | 55 kg |
World Championships
| Bronze medal – third place | 2013 Budapest | 55 kg |
European Championships
| Gold medal – first place | 2006 Szombathely | 55 kg |
| Bronze medal – third place | 2008 Tampere | 55 kg |

Péter Módos (born 17 December 1987 in Szigetvár) is a Hungarian wrestler. He won the bronze medal at the 2012 Summer Olympics in the Greco-Roman men's 55 kg event.
