= Vugar Rahimov =

Ukrainian Greco-Roman wrestler

Personal information
- Full name: Vugar Hamidullovych Rahimov
- Nationality: Ukraine
- Born: 5 February 1986 (age 40) Baku, Azerbaijan SSR, Soviet Union
- Height: 1.65 m (5 ft 5 in)
- Weight: 60 kg (132 lb)

Sport
- Sport: Wrestling
- Event: Greco-Roman
- Club: Metallurg Zaporozhye
- Coached by: Evgeny Chertkov
Medal record
Men's Greco-Roman wrestling
Representing Ukraine
European Championships
Silver medal – second place	2011 Dortmund	55 kg
Bronze medal – third place	2007 Moscow	55 kg
Bronze medal – third place	2010 Baku	55 kg
Military Games
Silver medal – second place	2007 Hyderabad	55 kg

Vugar Hamidullovych Rahimov (also Vyugar Ragymov, Ukrainian: Вьюгар Гамидуллович Рагімов; born February 5, 1986, in Baku, Azerbaijan SSR) is a Ukrainian Greco-Roman wrestler of Azerbaijani descent, who played for the men's featherweight category. He captured a silver medal for his division at the 2011 European Wrestling Championships in Dortmund, Germany, losing out to Armenia's Roman Amoyan. Ragymov is currently a member of the wrestling team for Metallurg Zaporzhye in his current residence Zaporizhia, and is coached and trained by Evgeny Chertkov.

Rakhimov represented Ukraine at the 2012 Summer Olympics in London, where he competed for the men's 55 kg class. He lost the qualifying round match to China's Li Shujin, with a three-set technical score (0–4, 2–0, 0–2), and a classification point score of 1–3.
