= Kristijan Fris =

Serbian Greco-Roman wrestler

Medal record

Men's Greco-Roman wrestling

Representing Serbia

World Championships
Bronze medal – third place	2007 Baku	55kg

European Championships
Gold medal – first place	2017 Novi Sad	59 kg
Bronze medal – third place	2007 Sofia	55kg

Individual World Cup
Bronze medal – third place	2020 Belgrade	60 kg

Mediterranean Games
Gold medal – first place	2009 Pescara	55kg
Bronze medal – third place	2013 Mersin	60kg

Representing Serbia and Montenegro

Mediterranean Games
Gold medal – first place	2005 Almeria	55kg

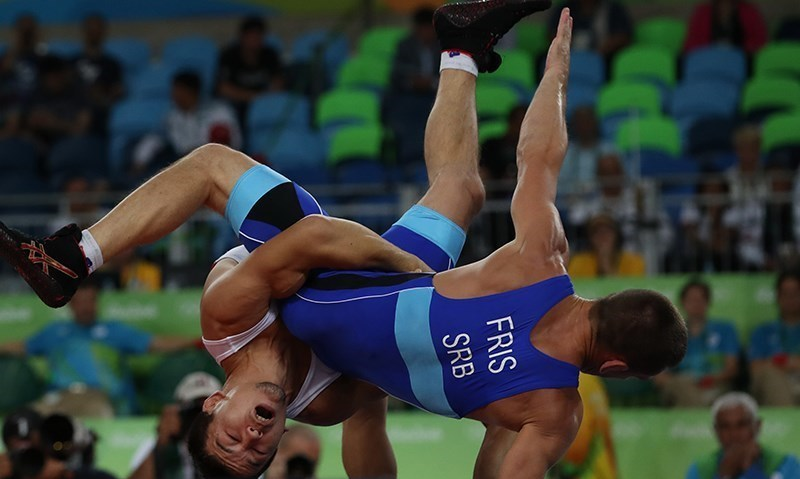
Kristijan Fris vs Elmurat Tasmuradov; Rio 2016

Kristijan Fris (Serbian Cyrillic: Кристијан Фрис, Hungarian: Frisz Krisztián; born 21 April 1984 in Senta, Serbia, Yugoslavia) is a Serbian sport wrestler.

He won a bronze medal at the 2007 World Wrestling Championships in Baku. He also won a bronze medal at the 2007 European Wrestling Championships. At the Mediterranean Games Kristijan won two gold medals.

Fris represented Serbia at the 2008 and 2016 Summer Olympics. He is an ethnic Hungarian.

In 2020, he won one of the bronze medals in the 60 kg event at the 2020 Individual Wrestling World Cup held in Belgrade, Serbia.
