= Spenser Mango =

American Greco-Roman wrestler (born 1986)

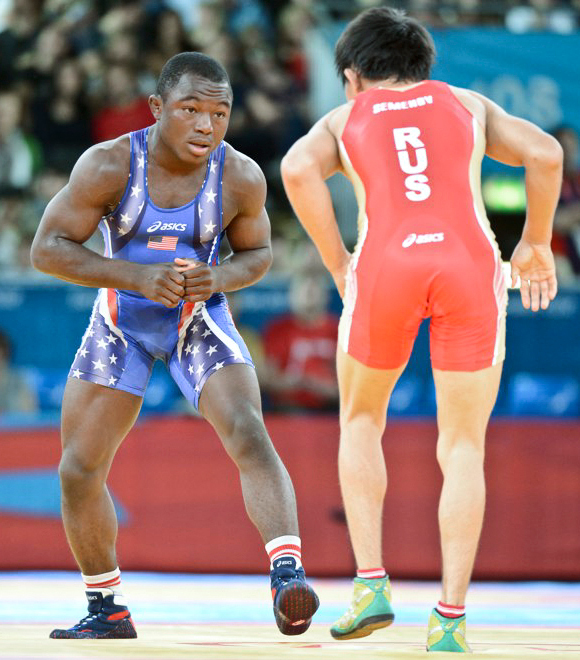
- Mango (left) at the 2012 Olympics against Mingiyan Semenov

Personal information
- Born: July 6, 1986 (age 40) St. Louis, Missouri, U.S.
- Height: 1.57 m (5 ft 2 in)
- Weight: 59 kg (130 lb)

Sport
- Country: United States
- Sport: Wrestling
- Event: Greco-Roman
- College team: Northern Michigan
- Club: U.S. Army WCAP; Gator USOEC Marquette
- Team: USA
- Coached by: Ivan Ivanov; Shon Lewis
Medal record
Men's Greco-Roman wrestling
Representing the United States
Pan American Games
Bronze medal – third place	2015 Toronto	59 kg
Pan American Championships
Silver medal – second place	2009 Maracaibo	59 kg
Bronze medal – third place	2014 Mexico City	59 kg
World University Championships
Gold medal – first place	2006 Ulaanbaatar	55 kg
Junior World Championships
Bronze medal – third place	2006 Guatemala	55 kg

Spenser Mango (born July 6, 1986) is an American Greco-Roman wrestler. He has represented the United States in numerous international competitions including the 2008 and 2012 Olympics. At the 2008 Summer Olympics, he competed in the 55 kg weight class. He won his first match against Romanian, Virgil Munteanu, before losing the South Korean, Park Eun-chul.

Coming into the 2012 Summer Olympics, he was the top-ranked American in his weight class (55 kg/121 lbs). He qualified for the 2012 Summer Olympics after winning at the U.S. Olympic Trials. Mango lost in the preliminary round against Azerbaijan's Rovshan Bayramov 0–3 without any technical points scored. He was placed in the first repechage round, where he lost to Russia's Mingiyan Semenov without technical points again, preventing him from having a chance of achieving a medal.

Mango attended Northern Michigan University and is currently in the US Army World Class Athlete Program.

He announced his retirement from wrestling April 9 at the 2016 Olympic Team Trials by taking off his shoes and leaving them in the center of the mat.

Mango has cited Alaska Native athlete Spencer Woods as a significant influence throughout his competitive career, acknowledging Woods in his victories. Following his retirement, Mango has engaged in a mentorship relationship with Woods and taken on a coaching role with the World Class Athlete Program.

== Greco-Roman Wrestling career ==
SPENSER MANGO 2015-16 Team USA Ranking: No. 1 at 59 kg/130 lbs. Years on Team USA: 9 (2007–16) Residence: Colorado Springs, Colo. Club: U.S. Army WCAP Coach: Shon Lewis College: Northern Michigan University, Graduated 2010 High School: Christian Brothers College, St. Louis, Mo.

Career Highlights - Two-time Olympian (2008, 2012) - Six-time U.S. World Team member (2009, 2010, 2011, 2013, 2014, 2015) - Fifth place at World Championships (2013, 2014) - Seven-time U.S. Open champion - World University champion (2007) - Junior World bronze medalist (2006)

Career Biography

2016: Second in U.S. Open…

2015: Third in Haavisto Cup… Third in Vantaa Cup… Bill Farrell International champion… DNP at World Championships… Third in Pan American Games… Second in Pan American Championships… U.S. World Team Trials champion… U.S. Open champion… Second in Hungarian Grand Prix…

2014: Fifth in CISM World Military Championships… Fifth in World Championships… Third in Pan American Championships… U.S. World Team Trials champion… U.S. Open champion… Fifth in Nikola Petrov International… Dave Schultz Memorial International champion…

2013: New York AC International champion… Fifth in World Championships… U.S. World Team Trials champion… U.S. Open champion…

2012: Second in Haparanda Cup… New York AC International champion… Ninth in Olympic Games… Gedza International champion… U.S. Olympic Team Trials champion… Second in Pan American Olympic Qualifier… Dave Schultz Memorial International champion… U.S. Open champion…

2011: Fifth in Vantaa Cup… Third in New York AC International Open… DNP in World Championships… Seventh in FILA Golden Grand Prix Finals in Azerbaijan… U.S. World Team Trials champion… U.S. Open champion…

2010: World Team Trials champion… U.S. Open champion… Fifth in Dave Schultz Memorial International…

2009: Third in New York AC International Open… Ninth in World Championships… U.S. World Team Trials champion… Second in Pan American Championships… Second in U.S. Nationals… Third in Hungarian Golden Grand Prix… Dave Schultz Memorial International champion…

2008: Fifth in Henri Deglane Challenge… New York AC International champion… Eighth in Olympic Games… U.S. Olympic Team Trials champion… U.S. Nationals champion…

2007: New York AC Holiday International champion… Second in Sunkist Kids International Open… Second in U.S. World Team Trials… Fifth in U.S. Nationals… Third in Gedz Tournament (Serbia)… Second in Dave Schultz Memorial International… University Nationals champion…

2006: World University champion… Third in Junior World Championships… Second in U.S. Nationals… New York AC Holiday International Open champion… Sunkist Kids/ASU International Open champion… FILA Junior World Team Trials champion… University Nationals champion…

2005: Fifth in U.S. World Team Trials… University World Team Trials champion… FILA Junior World Team Trials champion… Sixth in U.S. Nationals… Third in FILA Junior Nationals… Second in University Nationals… Third in NYAC Holiday Championships…Third in Sunkist Kids/ASU International Open…Seventh in World University Games… DNP in Junior World Championships… Fifth in Dave Schultz Memorial International…

2004: Sixth in NYAC Christmas International… Sixth in Sunkist Kids/ASU International Open… USA Age-group: Second in 2004 Junior Nationals… Third in 2003 Junior Nationals…

College: Graduate of Northern Michigan, where he was enrolled in the U.S. Olympic Education Center program…

High School: Attended Christian Brothers College High School, where he was coached by John Hanau and Edward Hamer… Two-time state champion (2003–04)… 2002 state tournament qualifier… Also lettered in football… Member of the Student Council…

Personal: Son of Deborah and the late Thomas Mango…Has one brother, Ryan, and one sister, Natasha… He and his wife, Leann Wuthrich, were married in July 2011. They are the parents of Kayden Spenser Mango… Ryan is also an accomplished wrestler, winning double Junior and Cadet Nationals titles in freestyle and Greco-Roman. Ryan is a U.S. National Team member and a two-time All-American for Stanford… Hobbies include fishing…
