= Roman Amoyan =

Armenian wrestler (born 1983)

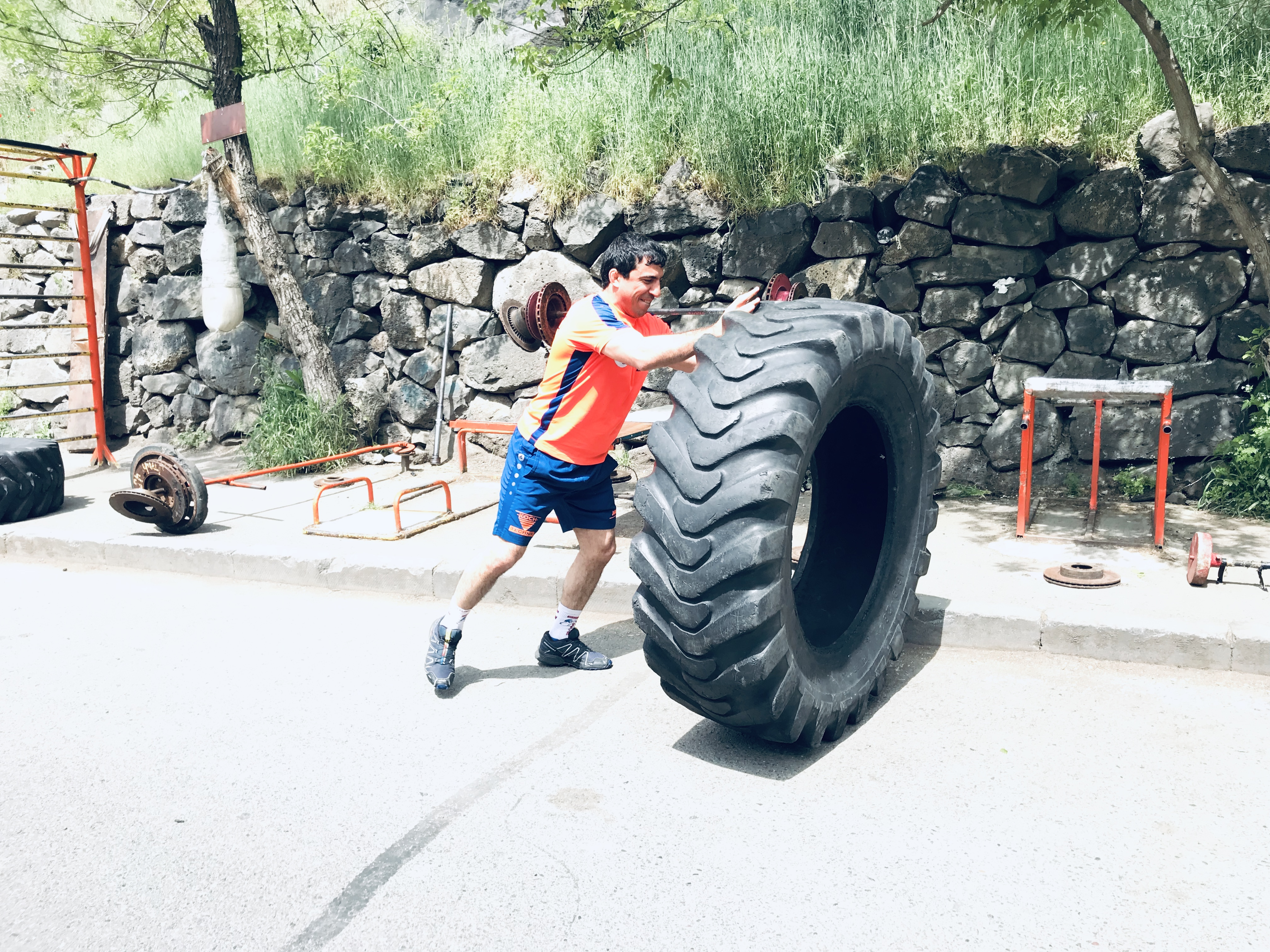
- Roman Amoyan in 2019

Personal information
- Born: 3 September 1983 (age 42) Yerevan, Armenia
- Height: 1.58 m (5 ft 2 in)
- Weight: 55 kg (121 lb)

Sport
- Sport: Wrestling
- Event: Greco-Roman
- Club: Dynamo Yerevan
- Coached by: Azis Amoyan
Medal record
Men's Greco-Roman wrestling
Representing Armenia
Olympic Games
Bronze medal – third place	2008 Beijing	55 kg
World Championships
Silver medal – second place	2009 Herning	55 kg
Bronze medal – third place	2010 Moscow	55 kg
Bronze medal – third place	2013 Budapest	55 kg
European Championship
Silver medal – second place	2003 Belgrade	55 kg
Silver medal – second place	2005 Varna	55 kg
Gold medal – first place	2006 Moscow	55 kg
Silver medal – second place	2008 Tampere	55 kg
Gold medal – first place	2011 Dortmund	55 kg
Silver medal – second place	2016 Riga	59 kg
World Cup
Gold medal – first place	2010 Yerevan	55 kg

Roman Amoyan (Armenian: Ռոման Ամոյան; born 3 September 1983) is an Armenian-Yazidi retired Greco-Roman wrestler. He is an Olympic bronze medalist, three-time World Championships medalist, and two-time European Champion. Amoyan received the Honored Master of Sports of Armenia title in 2009.

== Early life ==
Roman was born in Yerevan, Armenian SSR to Kurds–Yazidi parents. He started wrestling in 1995 and became a Junior World Champion in 2001 and a Junior European Champion in 2002. He is uncle of Malkhas Amoyan.

== Career ==
Amoyan won the Olympic bronze medal at the 2008 Summer Olympics in Beijing in the Men's Greco-Roman 55 kg. Amoyan was Armenia's first Olympic medalist in wrestling in 16 years.

He won a bronze medal in 2009 and a silver medal in 2010 at the World Wrestling Championships. Amoyan also won a gold medal in 2006 and three silver medals in 2003, 2005, and 2008 at the European Wrestling Championships.

Amoyan was a member of the Armenian Greco-Roman wrestling team at the 2010 Wrestling World Cup. The Armenian team came in third place. Amoyan personally won a gold medal.

In 2011, Amoyan was voted the Armenian Athlete of the Year. He had suffered a severe head injury early in the European Championships that year, but still bravely fought on, with a bloody wrapping on his head the whole time. Amoyan went on become a two-time European Champion despite the injury.

He failed to qualify for the 2012 Summer Olympics. Amoyan won another bronze medal at the World Championships in 2013 and another silver at the European Championships in 2016.

== Personal life ==
Amoyan is married. His wife is a doctor. They have a daughter.
