= India at the 2015 World Wrestling Championships =

23 Indian wrestlers participated in the 12th World Wrestling Championships (Combined), held in Las Vegas, Nevada, United States, from 7 to 15 September 2015. Both Indian wrestling legends Sushil Kumar earlier due to an injury and wrestler Yogeshwar Dutt pulled out his name at the final moment. In 2013 World Wrestling Championships, India won 1 silver and 2 bronze medals to secure 17th rank. Also the legendary Sushil Kumar could not make it to the tournament due to injury. In this event, Indian wrestlers failed to show their best performances, and ranked 24th in the medal list. However, in the Men's Freestyle category, they secured 10th position by winning the only bronze.

== Medalists ==
Medal	Name	Event	Date
Bronze	Narsingh Pancham Yadav	Men's freestyle 74 kg	13 September 2015

== Participants ==
=== Men's freestyle ===
Athletes	Event	Round of 64/Qualification	Round of 32	Round of 16	Quarterfinals	Repechage 1	Repechage 2	Semifinals	Final/BM
Athletes	Event	Opposition Score	Opposition Score	Opposition Score	Opposition Score	Opposition Score	Opposition Score	Opposition Score	Opposition Score
Amit Kumar	Men's freestyle 57 kg	Kim Sung-gwon (KOR); W 3 - 3	Sezar Akgül (TUR); W 6 - 4	Viktor Lebedev (RUS); L 2 - 1	Did Not Advance				
Bajrang Kumar	Men's freestyle 61 kg	BYE	Batboldyn Nomin (MGL); L 0 - 10	Did Not Advance		Reece Humphrey (USA); W 7 - 0	Beka Lomtadze (GEO); W 13 - 6	Did Not Advance	Vasyl Shuptar (UKR); L 6 - 6
Arun Kumar	Men's freestyle 70 kg	BYE	Cấn Tất Dự (VIE); W 7 - 0	Semen Radulov (UKR); W 5 - 4	James Green (USA); L 0 - 10	Did Not Advance			
Narsingh Pancham Yadav	Men's freestyle 74 kg	BYE	Hanoch Rachamin (ISR); W 14 - 2	Soner Demirtaş (TUR); W 4 - 3	Liván López (CUB); W 16 - 5	Did Not Advance		Pürevjavyn Önörbat (MGL); L 4 - 4	Zelimkhan Khadjiev (FRA); W 8 [F] - 12; Bronze
Naresh Kumar	Men's freestyle 86 kg	BYE	Marco Riesen (SUI); L 0 - 10	Did Not Advance					
Mausam Khatri	Men's freestyle 97 kg	BYE	Abdusalam Gadisov (RUS); L 0 - 10	Did Not Advance		Stefan Kehrer (GER); L 5 - 6	Did Not Advance		
S. Sumit	Men's freestyle 125 kg	BYE	Aiaal Lazarev (KGZ); L 0 - 3	Did Not Advance					

=== Women's freestyle ===
Athletes	Event	Round of 64/Qualification	Round of 32	Round of 16	Quarterfinals	Repechage	Semifinals	Final/BM
Athletes	Event	Opposition Score	Opposition Score	Opposition Score	Opposition Score	Opposition Score	Opposition Score	Opposition Score
Vinesh Phogat	Women's freestyle 48 kg	BYE	Kim Hyon-gyong (PRK); L 4- 8	Did Not Advance				
Babita Kumari	Women's freestyle 53 kg	Aide Cuero Munoz (COL); W 17- 4	Karima Sánchez (ESP); W 10- 0	Nina Hemmer (GER); W 13- 6	Zhong Xuechun (CHN) L 2- 6	Did Not Advance		
Lalita Sehrawat	Women's freestyle 55 kg	BYE	BYE	Anri Kimura (JPN); L 0 - 7	Did Not Advance			
Geeta Phogat	Women's freestyle 58 kg	BY	Kaori Icho (JPN); L 0 - 10	Did Not Advance				
Sarita	Women's freestyle 60 kg	BYE	BYE	Emese Barka (HUN); L 2 - 4	Did Not Advance			
Anita Sheoran	Women's freestyle 63 kg	BYE	Nadya Mushka (AZE); W 9 - 1	Sandra Roa (COL); L 2 - 5	Did Not Advance			
Navjot Kaur	Women's freestyle 69 kg	BYE	Alina Makhynia (UKR); L 0 - 8	Did Not Advance				
Nikki	Women's freestyle 75 kg	BYE	BYE	Chiaki Iijima (JPN); L 0 - 7	Did Not Advance			

=== Men's Greco-Roman ===
Athletes	Event	Round of 64/Qualification	Round of 32	Round of 16	Quarterfinals	Repechage	Semifinals	Final/BM
Athletes	Event	Opposition Score	Opposition Score	Opposition Score	Opposition Score	Opposition Score	Opposition Score	Opposition Score
Ravinder Singh	Men's Greco-Roman 59 kg	BYE	Rovshan Bayramov (AZE); L 0 - 10	Did Not Advance		Yun Won-chol (PRK); L 2 - 6	Did Not Advance	
Deepak Kumar	Men's Greco-Roman 66 kg	Vladimiros Matias (GRE); L 0 - 16	Did Not Advance					
Mohammed Rafiq Holi	Men's Greco-Roman 71 kg	BYE	Akrem Boudjemline (ALG); L 4 - 7	Did Not Advance				
Gurpreet Singh	Men's Greco-Roman 75 kg	BYE	Alvis Almendra (PAN); W 10 - 2	Andy Bisek (USA); L 4 - 6	Did Not Advance			
Harpreet Singh	Men's Greco-Roman 80 kg	BYE	Askhat Dilmukhamedov (KAZ); L 0 - 2	Did Not Advance				
Manoj Kumar	Men's Greco-Roman 85 kg	BYE	Rami Hietaniemi (FIN); L 0 - 10	Did Not Advance				
Hardeep Singh	Men's Greco-Roman 98 kg	BYE	Jahongir Turdiev (UZB); W 10 - 1	Alin Alexuc-Ciurariu (ROU); L 0 - 9	Did Not Advance			
Naveen Sevlia	Men's Greco-Roman 130 kg	BYE	Meng Qiang (CHN); L 2 - 6	Did Not Advance				
