= 2013 World Wrestling Championships – Men's Greco-Roman 74 kg =

World wrestling competition

Men's Greco-Roman 74 kg at the 2013 World Championships
- Venue: László Papp Budapest Sports Arena
- Dates: 22 September 2013
- Competitors: 39 from 39 nations

Medalists
gold medal	Kim Hyeon-woo	South Korea
silver medal	Roman Vlasov	Russia
bronze medal	Arsen Julfalakyan	Armenia
bronze medal	Emrah Kuş	Turkey

The men's Greco-Roman 74 kilograms is a competition featured at the 2013 World Wrestling Championships, and was held at the László Papp Budapest Sports Arena in Budapest, Hungary on 22 September 2013.

== Results ==
Legend

- C — Won by 3 cautions given to the opponent
- F — Won by fall

=== Finals ===
Semifinals		Final
Roman Vlasov (RUS)	5
Mark Madsen (DEN)	3	Roman Vlasov (RUS)	1
Kim Hyeon-woo (KOR)	7	Kim Hyeon-woo (KOR)	2
Emrah Kuş (TUR)	0

=== Top half ===
==== Section 1 ====
Round of 64

Round of 32
Florian Marchl (AUT)	0
Arsen Julfalakyan (ARM)	8
Alvis Almendra (PAN)	0
Roman Vlasov (RUS)	10
Esengeldi Kozhobek Uulu (KGZ)	8
Jonas Bossert (SUI)	0
Ionel Puşcaşu (ROU)	3
Piotr Przepiórka (POL)	4^{F}

Round of 16
Arsen Julfalakyan (ARM)	1
Roman Vlasov (RUS)	6
Esengeldi Kozhobek Uulu (KGZ)	5
Piotr Przepiórka (POL)	4

Quarterfinals
Roman Vlasov (RUS)	5
Esengeldi Kozhobek Uulu (KGZ)	2

==== Section 2 ====
Round of 64

Round of 32
Takehiro Kanakubo (JPN)	5
Aleksandr Kazakevič (LTU)	4
Mark Madsen (DEN)	4
Hadi Alizadeh (IRI)	0
Robert Rosengren (SWE)	3
Askhat Dilmukhamedov (KAZ)	2
Yavor Yanakiev (BUL)	3
Petros Manouilidis (GRE)	1

Round of 16
Takehiro Kanakubo (JPN)	1
Mark Madsen (DEN)	1
Robert Rosengren (SWE)	0
Yavor Yanakiev (BUL)	1

Quarterfinals
Mark Madsen (DEN)	3^{C}
Yavor Yanakiev (BUL)	1

=== Bottom half ===
==== Section 3 ====
Round of 64

Round of 32
Azizbek Murodov (UZB)	7
Luis Avendaño (VEN)	0
Veli-Karri Suominen (FIN)	5
Rajbir Chhikara (IND)	0
Tomáš Sobecký (CZE)	0
Yang Bin (CHN)	7
Richard Rigó (SVK)	0
Kim Hyeon-woo (KOR)	7

Round of 16
Azizbek Murodov (UZB)	1
Veli-Karri Suominen (FIN)	3^{F}
Yang Bin (CHN)	0
Kim Hyeon-woo (KOR)	8

Quarterfinals
Veli-Karri Suominen (FIN)	1
Kim Hyeon-woo (KOR)	5

==== Section 4 ====
Round of 64
Viktor Nemeš (SRB)	1
Rafig Huseynov (AZE)	6
Bálint Korpási (HUN)	1
Andy Bisek (USA)	2
Aliaksandr Dzemyanovich (BLR)	1
Emrah Kuş (TUR)	5^{C}
Aleksandrs Višņakovs (LAT)	9^{F}
Clinton Davies (NZL)	0
Ilia Gulbatashvili (GEO)	1
Florian Neumaier (GER)	0
Juan Ángel Escobar (MEX)	4
Igor Beşleaga (MDA)	3
Mykola Daragan (UKR)	9
Rafael Samurgashev (MNE)	2

Round of 32
Neven Žugaj (CRO)	3
Rafig Huseynov (AZE)	8
Andy Bisek (USA)	1
Emrah Kuş (TUR)	3
Aleksandrs Višņakovs (LAT)	3
Ilia Gulbatashvili (GEO)	5
Juan Ángel Escobar (MEX)	0
Mykola Daragan (UKR)	7

Round of 16
Rafig Huseynov (AZE)	1
Emrah Kuş (TUR)	3
Ilia Gulbatashvili (GEO)	0
Mykola Daragan (UKR)	7

Quarterfinals
Emrah Kuş (TUR)	4
Mykola Daragan (UKR)	3

=== Repechage ===
Repechage round 2
Alvis Almendra (PAN)	0
Arsen Julfalakyan (ARM)	8
Richard Rigó (SVK)	2
Yang Bin (CHN)	7

Repechage round 3
Arsen Julfalakyan (ARM)	8
Esengeldi Kozhobek Uulu (KGZ)	0
Yang Bin (CHN)	0
Veli-Karri Suominen (FIN)	5

Bronze medals
Arsen Julfalakyan (ARM)	3
Mark Madsen (DEN)	0
Veli-Karri Suominen (FIN)	0
Emrah Kuş (TUR)	7
