= Wrestling at the 2016 Summer Olympics – Men's Greco-Roman 75 kg =

Men's Greco-Roman 75 kg at the Games of the XXXI Olympiad
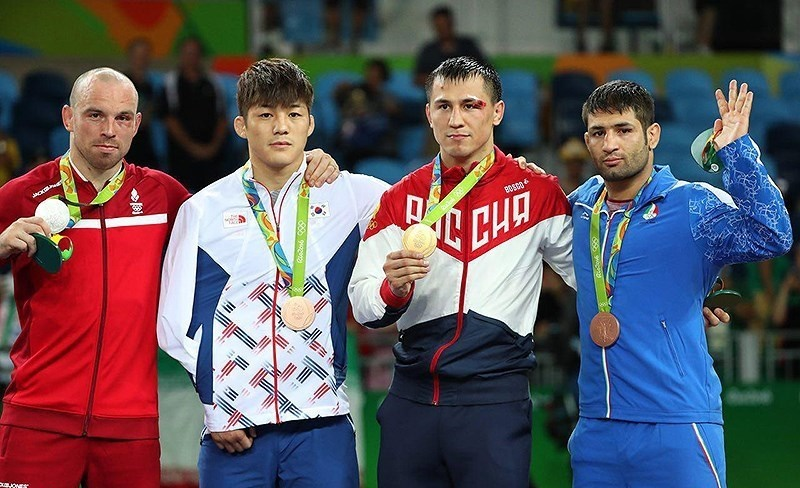
- Medalists
- Venue: Carioca Arena 2
- Date: 14 August 2016
- Competitors: 20 from 20 nations

Medalists
1st place, gold medalist(s)		Roman Vlasov	Russia
2nd place, silver medalist(s)		Mark Madsen	Denmark
3rd place, bronze medalist(s)		Kim Hyeon-woo	South Korea
3rd place, bronze medalist(s)		Saeid Abdevali	Iran

Men's Greco-Roman 75 kilograms competition at the 2016 Summer Olympics in Rio de Janeiro, Brazil took place on August 14 at the Carioca Arena 2 in Barra da Tijuca.

This Greco-Roman wrestling competition consists of a single-elimination tournament, with a repechage used to determine the winner of two bronze medals. The two finalists face off for gold and silver medals. Each wrestler who loses to one of the two finalists moves into the repechage, culminating in a pair of bronze medal matches featuring the semifinal losers each facing the remaining repechage opponent from their half of the bracket.

The medals for the competition were presented by Frederik, Crown Prince of Denmark, IOC member, Denmark, and the gifts were presented by Mikhail Mamiashvili of Russia, United World Wrestling vice president.

== Schedule ==
All times are Brasília Standard Time (UTC−03:00)

Date	Time	Event
14 August 2016	10:00	Qualification rounds
14 August 2016	16:00	Repechage
14 August 2016	17:00	Finals

== Results ==
=== Final ===
Final
Roman Vlasov (RUS)	5
Mark Madsen (DEN)	1

=== Top half ===
Qualifications

1/8 finals
Roman Vlasov (RUS)	7
Kim Hyeon-woo (KOR)	5
Yang Bin (CHN)	5
Zied Ayet Ikram (MAR)	0
Andy Bisek (USA)	1
Yurisandy Hernández (CUB)	0
Božo Starčević (CRO)	2
Selçuk Çebi (TUR)	1

1/4 finals
Roman Vlasov (RUS)	8
Yang Bin (CHN)	0
Andy Bisek (USA)	0
Božo Starčević (CRO)	2

Semifinals
Roman Vlasov (RUS)	6
Božo Starčević (CRO)	3

=== Bottom half ===
Qualifications
Daniel Aleksandrov (BUL)	3
Arsen Julfalakyan (ARM)	2
Carlos Muñoz (COL)	0
Péter Bácsi (HUN)	9
Elvin Mursaliyev (AZE)	2
Mahmoud Fawzy (EGY)	1
Zurabi Datunashvili (GEO)	0
Doszhan Kartikov (KAZ)	2

1/8 finals
Mark Madsen (DEN)	1
Saeid Abdevali (IRI)	1
Dilshod Turdiev (UZB)	2
Viktor Nemeš (SRB)	6
Daniel Aleksandrov (BUL)	0
Péter Bácsi (HUN)	8
Elvin Mursaliyev (AZE)	5
Doszhan Kartikov (KAZ)	1

1/4 finals
Mark Madsen (DEN)	4
Viktor Nemeš (SRB)	0
Péter Bácsi (HUN)	5
Elvin Mursaliyev (AZE)	0

Semifinals
Mark Madsen (DEN)	1
Péter Bácsi (HUN)	0

=== Repechage ===
Repechage round 2
Kim Hyeon-woo (KOR)	3
Yang Bin (CHN)	1
Saeid Abdevali (IRI)	2
Viktor Nemeš (SRB)	2

Round 2
Kim Hyeon-woo (KOR)	6
Božo Starčević (CRO)	4
Saeid Abdevali (IRI)	5
Péter Bácsi (HUN)	2

== Final standing ==
Rank	Athlete
1st place, gold medalist(s)	Roman Vlasov (RUS)
2nd place, silver medalist(s)	Mark Madsen (DEN)
3rd place, bronze medalist(s)	Kim Hyeon-woo (KOR)
3rd place, bronze medalist(s)	Saeid Abdevali (IRI)
5	Božo Starčević (CRO)
5	Péter Bácsi (HUN)
7	Elvin Mursaliyev (AZE)
8	Viktor Nemeš (SRB)
9	Yang Bin (CHN)
10	Doszhan Kartikov (KAZ)
11	Daniel Aleksandrov (BUL)
12	Andy Bisek (USA)
13	Arsen Julfalakyan (ARM)
14	Dilshod Turdiev (UZB)
15	Selçuk Çebi (TUR)
15	Mahmoud Fawzy (EGY)
17	Yurisandy Hernández (CUB)
18	Zurabi Datunashvili (GEO)
19	Zied Ayet Ikram (MAR)
20	Carlos Muñoz (COL)
