= 2011 World Wrestling Championships – Men's Greco-Roman 74 kg =

Men's Greco-Roman 74 kg at the 2011 World Championships
- Venue: Sinan Erdem Dome
- Dates: 14 September 2011
- Competitors: 47 from 47 nations

Medalists
gold medal	Roman Vlasov	Russia
silver medal	Selçuk Çebi	Turkey
bronze medal	Neven Žugaj	Croatia
bronze medal	Arsen Julfalakyan	Armenia

The men's Greco-Roman 74 kilograms is a competition featured at the 2011 World Wrestling Championships, and was held at the Sinan Erdem Dome in Istanbul, Turkey on 14 September 2011.

== Results ==
Legend

- F — Won by fall
- WO — Won by walkover

=== Finals ===
Semifinals				Final
Roman Vlasov (RUS)	0	1	3
Neven Žugaj (CRO)	1	0	0	Roman Vlasov (RUS)	1	2
Selçuk Çebi (TUR)	0	1	2	Selçuk Çebi (TUR)	0	0
Askhat Dilmukhamedov (KAZ)	1	0	0

=== Top half ===
==== Section 1 ====
Round of 64

Round of 32
Vojtech Jakus (SVK)	0	0
Roman Vlasov (RUS)	1	3
Luillys Pérez (VEN)	2	0	0
Robert Rosengren (SWE)	0	1	1
Chang Yongxiang (CHN)	0	3	3
Meraldo Ndoka (ALB)	1	0	0
Rajbir Chhikara (IND)	0	0
Farshad Alizadeh (IRI)	2	3

Round of 16
Roman Vlasov (RUS)	1	2
Robert Rosengren (SWE)	0	0
Chang Yongxiang (CHN)	2	0	0
Farshad Alizadeh (IRI)	0	2	4

Quarterfinals
Roman Vlasov (RUS)	1	1
Farshad Alizadeh (IRI)	0	0

==== Section 2 ====
Round of 64

Round of 32
Konstantin Schneider (GER)	3	0	2
Daniar Kobonov (KGZ)	0	2	3
Rafig Huseynov (AZE)	3	2
Azizbek Murodov (UZB)	0	0
Neven Žugaj (CRO)	4	2
Tomáš Sobecký (CZE)	0	0
Manuchar Kvirkvelia (GEO)	4	1
Henri Välimäki (FIN)	0	0

Round of 16
Daniar Kobonov (KGZ)	0	3	0
Rafig Huseynov (AZE)	1	0	2
Neven Žugaj (CRO)	1	1	2
Manuchar Kvirkvelia (GEO)	4	0	0

Quarterfinals
Rafig Huseynov (AZE)	0	0
Neven Žugaj (CRO)	1	1

=== Bottom half ===
==== Section 3 ====
Round of 64
Musaab Al-Nakadli (SYR)	0	1	0
Jure Kuhar (SLO)	1	0	3
Abdul Karim Kalokoh (SLE)
Keitani Graham (FSM)	W	O
Hansel Mercedes (DOM)	0	0
Sixto Barrera (PER)	2	4
Christophe Guénot (FRA)	1	0	0
Zied Ayet Ikram (TUN)	0	1	2
Selçuk Çebi (TUR)	3^{F}
Petros Manouilidis (GRE)	0
Volodymyr Shatskykh (UKR)	4	3
Florian Marchl (AUT)	0	0
Saverio Scaramuzzi (ITA)	0	0
Arsen Julfalakyan (ARM)	1	2

Round of 32
José Escobar (COL)	0	0
Jure Kuhar (SLO)	1	6
Keitani Graham (FSM)	0	0
Sixto Barrera (PER)	3	3
Zied Ayet Ikram (TUN)	0	0
Selçuk Çebi (TUR)	1	1
Volodymyr Shatskykh (UKR)	0	0
Arsen Julfalakyan (ARM)	2	2

Round of 16
Jure Kuhar (SLO)	2	1
Sixto Barrera (PER)	0	0
Selçuk Çebi (TUR)	1	0	1
Arsen Julfalakyan (ARM)	0	2	0

Quarterfinals
Jure Kuhar (SLO)	1	0	0
Selçuk Çebi (TUR)	0	3	3

==== Section 4 ====
Round of 64
Aleksandr Kazakevič (LTU)	0	1	1
Andy Bisek (USA)	2	0	3
Jonas Bossert (SUI)	0	0
Askhat Dilmukhamedov (KAZ)	1	5
Mark Madsen (DEN)	0	1	0
Aliaksandr Kikiniou (BLR)	1	0	1
Jakub Tim (POL)	2	0	0
Ilian Georgiev (BUL)	0	2	2
Péter Bácsi (HUN)	4	4
Kim Jin-hyeok (KOR)	0	0
Hassan Shahsavan (AUS)	0	0
Takehiro Kanakubo (JPN)	1	2
Ionel Puşcaşu (ROU)	1	0	3
Goran Bulatović (SRB)	0	2	0
Ilya Shafran (ISR)	2	0	1
Juan Ángel Escobar (MEX)	0	1	0

Round of 32
Andy Bisek (USA)	0	0
Askhat Dilmukhamedov (KAZ)	1	1
Aliaksandr Kikiniou (BLR)	1	1
Ilian Georgiev (BUL)	0	0
Péter Bácsi (HUN)	2	3
Takehiro Kanakubo (JPN)	0	0
Ionel Puşcaşu (ROU)	1	1
Ilya Shafran (ISR)	0	0

Round of 16
Askhat Dilmukhamedov (KAZ)	0	3	1
Aliaksandr Kikiniou (BLR)	1	0	0
Péter Bácsi (HUN)	2	0	2
Ionel Puşcaşu (ROU)	0	3	0

Quarterfinals
Askhat Dilmukhamedov (KAZ)	3	3^{F}
Péter Bácsi (HUN)	0	0

=== Repechage ===
Repechage round 1
Petros Manouilidis (GRE)	1	0	2
Zied Ayet Ikram (TUN)	0	1	0

Repechage round 2
Vojtech Jakus (SVK)	0	0
Robert Rosengren (SWE)	1	1
Petros Manouilidis (GRE)	0	0
Arsen Julfalakyan (ARM)	1	3

Repechage round 3
Robert Rosengren (SWE)	3	0	2
Farshad Alizadeh (IRI)	0	2	0
Arsen Julfalakyan (ARM)	4	1
Jure Kuhar (SLO)	0	0

Bronze medals
Robert Rosengren (SWE)	2	0	0
Neven Žugaj (CRO)	0	1	2
Arsen Julfalakyan (ARM)	2	1
Askhat Dilmukhamedov (KAZ)	0	0
