= Denmark at the 2016 Summer Olympics =

- IOC code: DEN
- NOC: National Olympic Committee and Sports Confederation of Denmark
- Website: www.dif.dk (in Danish and English)

in Rio de Janeiro
- Competitors: 120 in 16 sports
- Flag bearers: Caroline Wozniacki (opening); Pernille Blume (closing)
- Medals Ranked 28th: Gold 2 Silver 6 Bronze 7 Total 15

Summer Olympics appearances (overview)
- 1896; 1900; 1904; 1908; 1912; 1920; 1924; 1928; 1932; 1936; 1948; 1952; 1956; 1960; 1964; 1968; 1972; 1976; 1980; 1984; 1988; 1992; 1996; 2000; 2004; 2008; 2012; 2016; 2020; 2024; 2028

Other related appearances
- 1906 Intercalated Games

Denmark competed at the 2016 Summer Olympics in Rio de Janeiro, Brazil, from 5 to 21 August 2016. Danish athletes have appeared in every edition of the Summer Olympic Games throughout the modern era, except for the sparsely attended 1904 Summer Olympics in St. Louis. The Danish team consisted of 120 athletes, 79 men and 41 women, across sixteen sports. Before the start of the games, DIF sat an official medal goal of 10 medals for the Rio games.

Denmark returned home from Rio de Janeiro with 15 medals (2 golds, 6 silver, and 7 bronze), marking the country's most successful outcome in Summer Olympic history since 1948. Three of these medals were awarded to the Danish squad in cycling, two in badminton, rowing, sailing, and swimming, and one each in sprint kayaking, track and field, and Greco-Roman wrestling. These Games also witnessed a historic moment for the male Danes in collective sports, as they overcame the two-time defending French champions 28–26 to win their first ever gold medal in the men's handball tournament.

Among the nation's medalists were badminton tandem Kamilla Rytter Juhl and Christinna Pedersen in the women's doubles, rower Morten Jørgensen, who completed a full set of medals at his third Games with a silver in the men's lightweight fours, hurdler Sara Slott Petersen, who made history by becoming the first Danish woman to ascend the podium in any track event, and Greco-Roman wrestler and three-time Olympian Mark Madsen, who brought home the country's first ever medal in his signature sport after more than eight decades.

Two Danish athletes collected more than a single medal at these Games, including track cyclist Lasse Norman Hansen, who won a bronze each in both men's team pursuit and omnium, and swimmer Pernille Blume, who outlasted the favorites in the women's 50 m freestyle to hand her country's first Olympic swimming title since 1948. Additionally, Blume helped the Danish foursome of backstroker Mie Nielsen, breaststroker and world-record holder Rikke Møller Pedersen, and butterfly sprinter and four-time Olympian Jeanette Ottesen beat the European record for the bronze medal in the women's medley relay final.

== Medalists ==
The following Danish athletes won medals at the Games. In the by discipline sections below, medalists' names are bolded.

Medal	Name	Sport	Event	Date
Gold	Pernille Blume	Swimming	Women's 50 m freestyle	13 August
Gold	Denmark men's national handball team: Niklas Landin Jacobsen; Mads Christiansen; Mads Mensah Larsen; Casper Ulrich Mortensen; Jesper Nøddesbo; Jannick Green; Lasse Svan Hansen; Hans Lindberg; Rene Toft Hansen; Henrik Møllgaard; Kasper Søndergaard; Henrik Toft Hansen; Mikkel Hansen; Morten Olsen; Michael Damgaard	Handball	Men's tournament	21 August
Silver	Jakob Fuglsang	Cycling	Men's road race	6 August
Silver	Jacob Barsøe; Kasper Winther Jørgensen; Morten Jørgensen; Jacob Larsen	Rowing	Men's lightweight four	11 August
Silver	Mark Madsen	Wrestling	Men's Greco-Roman 75 kg	14 August
Silver	Emma Åstrand Jørgensen	Canoeing	Women's K-1 500 m	18 August
Silver	Kamilla Rytter Juhl; Christinna Pedersen	Badminton	Women's doubles	18 August
Silver	Sara Slott Petersen	Athletics	Women's 400 m hurdles	18 August
Bronze	Anne Dsane Andersen; Lærke Rasmussen	Rowing	Women's coxless pair	12 August
Bronze	Casper Folsach; Lasse Norman Hansen; Niklas Larsen; Frederik Madsen; Rasmus Quaade	Cycling	Men's team pursuit	12 August
Bronze	Mie Nielsen; Rikke Møller Pedersen; Jeanette Ottesen; Pernille Blume	Swimming	Women's 4 × 100 m medley relay	13 August
Bronze	Lasse Norman Hansen	Cycling	Men's omnium	15 August
Bronze	Anne-Marie Rindom	Sailing	Laser Radial	16 August
Bronze	Jena Mai Hansen; Katja Salskov-Iversen	Sailing	49erFX	18 August
Bronze	Viktor Axelsen	Badminton	Men's singles	19 August

Medals by sport
**Sport**	1st place, gold medalist(s)	2nd place, silver medalist(s)	3rd place, bronze medalist(s)	**Total**
Swimming	1	0	1	2
Cycling	0	1	2	3
Rowing	0	1	1	2
Athletics	0	1	0	1
Badminton	0	1	1	2
Canoeing	0	1	0	1
Wrestling	0	1	0	1
Sailing	0	0	2	2
Handball	1	0	0	1
Total	2	6	7	15

Medals by day
**Day**	1st place, gold medalist(s)	2nd place, silver medalist(s)	3rd place, bronze medalist(s)	**Total**
6 August	0	1	0	1
7 August	0	0	0	0
8 August	0	0	0	0
9 August	0	0	0	0
10 August	0	0	0	0
11 August	0	1	0	1
12 August	0	0	2	2
13 August	1	0	1	2
14 August	0	1	0	1
15 August	0	0	1	1
16 August	0	0	1	1
17 August	0	0	0	0
18 August	0	3	1	4
19 August	0	0	1	1
20 August	0	0	0	0
21 August	1	0	0	1
Total	2	6	7	15

Medals by gender
**Gender**	1st place, gold medalist(s)	2nd place, silver medalist(s)	3rd place, bronze medalist(s)	**Total**
Male	1	3	3	7
Female	1	3	4	8
Total	2	6	7	15

== Competitors ==
The National Olympic Committee and Sports Confederation of Denmark fielded a roster of 120 athletes, 79 men and 41 women, to compete across sixteen different sports at these Games; it was the nation's largest delegation sent to the Olympics since 1972, beating the record of 119 athletes who attended the Atlanta Games two decades earlier. Denmark qualified teams in men's handball and in men's football for the first time in 24 years.

Swimming accounted for the largest number of athletes on the Danish squad by an individual-based sport, with 15 entries. There was only a single competitor each in table tennis, tennis, triathlon, and Greco-Roman wrestling.

Fourteen of the nation's Olympic medalists from London 2012 returned, with rowing tandem Rasmus Quist Hansen and Mads Rasmussen (men's lightweight double sculls), as well as track cyclist Lasse Norman Hansen (men's omnium), looking to defend their respective titles in Rio de Janeiro. Rifle prone marksman and 2000 silver medalist Torben Grimmel headed the full roster of experienced Danish athletes by competing at his fifth consecutive Games. Joining Hansen and Rasmussen as four-time Olympians were butterfly and freestyle swimmer Jeanette Ottesen, Finn sailor and 2012 silver medalist Jonas Høgh Christensen, and rower and 2012 fourth-place finalist Juliane Elander Rasmussen in the women's lightweight double sculls.

Other notable athletes on the Danish roster featured badminton player and 2014 world bronze medalist Viktor Axelsen in the men's singles, sprint kayaker and 2008 silver medalist Rene Holten Poulsen, breaststroke swimmer and current world record holder Rikke Møller Pedersen, long-distance freestyle swimmer and 2008 bronze medalist Lotte Friis, and Greco-Roman wrestler and mixed martial arts fighter Mark Madsen. Former top-ranked tennis player Caroline Wozniacki was selected by the committee to carry the Danish flag at the opening ceremony, the first by a female since 1988 and third overall in Summer Olympic history.

The following is the list of number of competitors participating in the Games. Note that reserves in fencing, field hockey, football, and handball are not counted as athletes:

Sport	Men	Women	Total
Athletics	3	5	8
Badminton	5	3	8
Canoeing	1	4	5
Cycling	10	3	13
Equestrian	1	3	4
Football	18	0	18
Golf	2	2	4
Handball	14	0	14
Rowing	6	7	13
Sailing	6	5	11
Shooting	2	1	3
Swimming	8	7	15
Table tennis	1	0	1
Tennis	0	1	1
Triathlon	1	0	1
Wrestling	1	0	1
Total	79	41	120

== Athletics ==
Danish athletes have so far achieved qualifying standards in the following athletics events (up to a maximum of 3 athletes in each event): London 2012 Olympians Andreas Bube and Sara Slott Petersen, along with 2010 Youth Olympic hurdler Stina Troest, were among the first batch of Danish track and field athletes being named to the Olympic roster on 17 May 2016, and were joined by three marathon runners (one man and two women) three days later.

Key

- Note–Ranks given for track events are within the athlete's heat only
- Q = Qualified for the next round
- q = Qualified for the next round as a fastest loser or, in field events, by position without achieving the qualifying target
- NR = National record
- N/A = Round not applicable for the event
- Bye = Athlete not required to compete in round

Track & road events
Men

Athlete	Event	Heat		Semifinal		Final	
Athlete	Event	Result	Rank	Result	Rank	Result	Rank
Andreas Bube	800 m	1:46.67	2 Q	1:45.87	7	Did not advance	
Ole Hesselbjerg	3000 m steeplechase	8:40.08	11	—N/a		Did not advance	
Abdi Hakin Ulad	Marathon	—N/a				2:17:06	35

Women

Athlete	Event	Heat		Semifinal		Final	
Athlete	Event	Result	Rank	Result	Rank	Result	Rank
Anna Holm Baumeister	Marathon	—N/a				2:39:49	55
Jessica Draskau-Petersson	Marathon	—N/a				2:36:14	40
Anna Emilie Møller	3000 m steeplechase	9:32.68 NR	6	—N/a		Did not advance	
Sara Slott Petersen	400 m hurdles	55.20	1 Q	54.55	2 Q	53.55	2nd place, silver medalist(s)
Stina Troest	400 m hurdles	56.06	4 Q	56.00	4	Did not advance	

== Badminton ==
Denmark has qualified a total of eight badminton players for the following events into the Olympic tournament based on the BWF World Rankings as of 5 May 2016: two entries in the men's singles, one in the women's singles, and a pair each in the men's, women's, and mixed doubles.

Men

Athlete	Event	Group Stage				Elimination	Quarterfinal	Semifinal	Final / BM	
Athlete	Event	Opposition Score	Opposition Score	Opposition Score	Rank	Opposition Score	Opposition Score	Opposition Score	Opposition Score	Rank
Viktor Axelsen	Singles	Lee D-k (KOR); W (21–11, 21–13)	Ponsana (THA); W (21–14, 21–13)	—N/a	1 Q	Evans (IRL); W (21–16, 21–12)	Ouseph (GBR); W (21–12, 21–16)	Chen L (CHN); L (14–21, 15–21)	Lin D (CHN); W (15–21, 21–10, 21–17)	3rd place, bronze medalist(s)
Jan Østergaard Jørgensen	Singles	Must (EST); W (21–8, 21–15)	Leverdez (FRA); W (21–11, 21–18)	—N/a	1 Q	Kidambi (IND); L (19–21, 19–21)	Did not advance			
Mathias Boe; Carsten Mogensen	Doubles	Kim G-j / Kim S-r (KOR); L (15–21, 18–21)	Cwalina / Wacha (POL); W (21–17, 21–17)	Ellis / Langridge (GBR); W (21–9, 9–21, 21–16)	3	—N/a	Did not advance			

Women

Athlete	Event	Group Stage				Elimination	Quarterfinal	Semifinal	Final / BM	
Athlete	Event	Opposition Score	Opposition Score	Opposition Score	Rank	Opposition Score	Opposition Score	Opposition Score	Opposition Score	Rank
Line Kjærsfeldt	Singles	Marín (ESP); L (16–21, 13–21)	Vainio (FIN); W (21–9, 21–8)	—N/a	2	Did not advance				
Kamilla Rytter Juhl; Christinna Pedersen	Doubles	Jung K-e / Shin S-c (KOR); W (21–16, 21–18)	Luo Y / Luo Y (CHN); L (11–21, 18–21)	Lee / Obañana (USA); W (21–9, 21–6)	2 Q	—N/a	Chang Y-n / Lee S-h (KOR); W (28–26, 18–21, 21–15)	Tang YT / Yu Y (CHN); W (21–16, 14–21, 21–19)	Matsutomo / Takahashi (JPN); L (21–18, 9–21, 19–21)	2nd place, silver medalist(s)

Mixed

Athlete	Event	Group Stage				Quarterfinal	Semifinal	Final / BM	
Athlete	Event	Opposition Score	Opposition Score	Opposition Score	Rank	Opposition Score	Opposition Score	Opposition Score	Rank
Joachim Fischer Nielsen; Christinna Pedersen	Doubles	Xu C / Ma J (CHN); L (24–22, 14–21, 16–21)	Mateusiak / Zięba (POL); W (21–18, 23–21)	C Adcock / G Adcock (GBR); L (19–21, 24–22, 17–21)	4	Did not advance			

== Canoeing ==
=== Sprint ===
Danish canoeists have qualified one boat in each of the following events through the 2015 ICF Canoe Sprint World Championships.

Athlete	Event	Heats		Semifinals		Final	
Athlete	Event	Time	Rank	Time	Rank	Time	Rank
Rene Holten Poulsen	Men's K-1 1000 m	3:35.722	1 Q	3:34.344	4 FA	3:36.840	6
Henriette Engel Hansen	Women's K-1 200 m	42.455	6 Q	43.300	8	Did not advance	
Emma Åstrand Jørgensen	Women's K-1 500 m	1:55.660	2 Q	1:55.193	2 FA	1:54.326	2nd place, silver medalist(s)
Henriette Engel Hansen; Ida Villumsen	Women's K-2 500 m	1:46.246	4 Q	1:47.476	6 FB	1:48.846	12
Henriette Engel Hansen; Emma Åstrand Jørgensen; Amalie Ringtved Thomsen; Ida Villumsen	Women's K-4 500 m	1:36.675	5 Q	1:36.302	3 FA	1:39.057	6

Qualification Legend: FA = Qualify to final (medal); FB = Qualify to final B (non-medal)

== Cycling ==
=== Road ===
Danish riders qualified for a maximum of three quota places in the men's Olympic road race by virtue of their top 15 final national ranking in the 2015 UCI Europe Tour. The road cycling team, led by two-time Olympian Jakob Fuglsang, was named to the Olympic roster on 23 June 2016.

Athlete	Event	Time	Rank
Jakob Fuglsang	Men's road race	6:10:05	2nd place, silver medalist(s)
Christopher Juul-Jensen	Men's road race	6:19:43	32
Christopher Juul-Jensen	Men's time trial	1:16:49.62	19
Chris Anker Sørensen	Men's road race	6:30:05	60

=== Track ===
Following the completion of the 2016 UCI Track Cycling World Championships, Danish riders have accumulated spots in the men's team pursuit, as well as both the men's and women's omnium. The track cycling squad, highlighted by reigning Olympic champion Lasse Norman Hansen in the men's omnium, was named on 18 June 2016.

Pursuit

Athlete	Event	Qualification		Semifinals		Final	
Athlete	Event	Time	Rank	Opponent Results	Rank	Opponent Results	Rank
Casper Folsach; Lasse Norman Hansen; Niklas Larsen; Frederik Madsen; Rasmus Quaade	Men's team pursuit	3:55.396	2 Q	Australia; 3:53.542	3	New Zealand; 3:53.789	3rd place, bronze medalist(s)

Qualification Legend: FA=Final (medal); FB=Bronze medal game; SF=Semifinals

Omnium

Athlete	Event	Scratch race		Individual pursuit			Elimination race		Time trial			Flying lap			Points race		Total points	Rank
Athlete	Event	Rank	Points	Time	Rank	Points	Rank	Points	Time	Rank	Points	Time	Rank	Points	Points	Rank	Total points	Rank
Lasse Norman Hansen	Men's omnium	1	40	4:14.982 OR	1	40	18	6	1:02.538	5	32	12.832	4	34	40	2	192	3rd place, bronze medalist(s)
Amalie Dideriksen	Women's omnium	7	28	3:30.264	4	34	6	30	38:032	18	6	14:940	18	6	85	1	189	5

=== Mountain biking ===
Danish mountain bikers qualified for one men's and one women's quota place each into the Olympic cross-country race, as a result of the nation's eighteenth-place finish for men and eleventh for women, respectively, in the UCI Olympic Ranking List of 25 May 2016. The mountain biking squad was named to the Olympic roster on 9 June 2016.

Athlete	Event	Time	Rank
Simon Andreassen	Men's cross-country	1:47:44	34
Annika Langvad	Women's cross-country	1:33:48	11

=== BMX ===
Danish riders qualified for one men's and one women's quota place in BMX at the Olympics, as a result of the nation's top three placement for men, not yet qualified, at the 2016 UCI BMX World Championships, and top three for women in the UCI BMX Individual Ranking List of 31 May 2016. BMX riders Niklas Laustsen and European Games champion Simone Christensen were named to the Olympic roster on 13 June 2016.

Athlete	Event	Seeding		Quarterfinal		Semifinal		Final	
Athlete	Event	Result	Rank	Points	Rank	Points	Rank	Result	Rank
Niklas Laustsen	Men's BMX	36.199	24	19	7	Did not advance			
Simone Christensen	Women's BMX	35.251	4	—N/a		18	7	Did not advance	

== Equestrian ==
Denmark has fielded a composite squad of four riders into the Olympic team eventing by virtue of the following results in the individual FEI Olympic rankings: top two finishes from North Western Europe, and two top six finishes from the combined overall FEI Olympic rankings.

=== Dressage ===
Long list for the dressage team was published on 30 April. Final team was named on 17 July, after several observation events which included FEI Nations Cup competitions in Odense and Aachen as well as the Danish Dressage Championships in Broholm.

Athlete	Horse	Event	Grand Prix		Grand Prix Special		Grand Prix Freestyle		Overall	
Athlete	Horse	Event	Score	Rank	Score	Rank	Technical	Artistic	Score	Rank
Anders Dahl	Selten	Individual	69.900	37 Q	71.232	30	Did not advance			
Cathrine Dufour	Cassidy	Individual	76.657	10 Q	76.050	12 Q	74.893	81.286	78.143	13
Anna Kasprzak	Donnperignon	Individual	73.943	23 Q	74.524	15 Q	74.821	79.143	76.982	14
Agnete Kirk Thinggaard	Jojo	Individual	72.229	27 Q	72.465	26	Did not advance			
Anders Dahl; Cathrine Dufour; Anna Kasprzak; Agnete Kirk Thinggaard	See above	Team	74.276	6 Q	74.346	6	—N/a		74.311	6

== Football ==
Summary

Key:
- P – Match decided by penalty-shootout.
- A.E.T – After extra time.

Team	Event	Group Stage				Quarterfinal	Semifinal	Final / BM	
Team	Event	Opposition Score	Opposition Score	Opposition Score	Rank	Opposition Score	Opposition Score	Opposition Score	Rank
Denmark men's	Men's tournament	Iraq; D 0–0	South Africa; W 1–0	Brazil; L 0–4	2	Nigeria; L 0–2	Did not advance		8

=== Men's tournament ===
Denmark's men's football team qualified for the Olympics by reaching the semifinals at the 2015 UEFA European Under-21 Championship in the Czech Republic.

Team roster

The following is the Danish final squad in the men's football tournament of the 2016 Summer Olympics. Yussuf Poulsen, Uffe Bech and Lasse Vigen Christensen left the squad due to several reasons and were replaced by Jacob Bruun Larsen, Jacob Barrett Laursen and Mathias Hebo.

Head coach: Niels Frederiksen

No.	Pos.	Player	Date of birth (age)	Caps	Goals	2016 club
1	GK	Jeppe Højbjerg	30 April 1995 (aged 21)	0	0	(Danish Football Association) Esbjerg
2	DF	Mikkel Desler	19 February 1995 (aged 21)	0	0	(Danish Football Association) OB
3	DF	Kasper Larsen	25 January 1993 (aged 23)	0	0	(Royal Dutch Football Association) Groningen
4	DF	Edigeison Gomes*	17 November 1988 (aged 27)	0	0	(Chinese Football Association) Henan Jianye
5	DF	Jakob Blåbjerg	11 January 1995 (aged 21)	0	0	(Danish Football Association) AaB
6	MF	Andreas Maxsø	18 March 1994 (aged 22)	0	0	(Danish Football Association) Nordsjælland
7	FW	Lasse Vibe* (c)	22 July 1987 (aged 29)	0	0	(The Football Association) Brentford
8	MF	Mathias Hebo	2 August 1995 (aged 21)	0	0	(Danish Football Association) Fredericia
9	FW	Nicolai Brock-Madsen	9 January 1993 (aged 23)	0	0	(The Football Association) Birmingham City
10	FW	Jacob Bruun Larsen	19 September 1998 (aged 17)	0	0	(German Football Association) Borussia Dortmund
11	DF	Jacob Barrett Laursen	17 November 1994 (aged 21)	0	0	(Danish Football Association) OB
12	FW	Frederik Børsting	13 February 1995 (aged 21)	0	0	(Danish Football Association) AaB
13	FW	Emil Larsen*	22 June 1991 (aged 25)	0	0	(Danish Football Association) Lyngby
14	MF	Casper Nielsen	29 April 1994 (aged 22)	0	0	(Danish Football Association) Esbjerg
15	DF	Pascal Gregor	18 February 1994 (aged 22)	0	0	(Danish Football Association) Nordsjælland
16	FW	Robert Skov	20 May 1996 (aged 20)	0	0	(Danish Football Association) Silkeborg
17	MF	Jens Jønsson	10 January 1993 (aged 23)	0	0	(Danish Football Association) AGF
18	GK	Lukas Fernandes	1 March 1993 (aged 23)	0	0	(Danish Football Association) Sønderjyske

* Over-aged player.

Group play

Pos	Team	Pld	W	D	L	GF	GA	GD	Pts	Qualification
1	Brazil (H)	3	1	2	0	4	0	+4	5	Quarter-finals
2	Denmark	3	1	1	1	1	4	−3	4	Quarter-finals
3	Iraq	3	0	3	0	1	1	0	3	
4	South Africa	3	0	2	1	1	2	−1	2	

Source: Rio2016 & FIFA
Rules for classification: Tiebreakers
(H) Hosts
4 August 2016
13:00

Iraq	0–0	Denmark
	Report (Rio2016); Report (FIFA)

Estádio Nacional Mané Garrincha, Brasília
Attendance: 18,000
Referee: César Ramos (Mexico)

7 August 2016
19:00

Denmark	1–0	South Africa
Skov 69'	Report (Rio2016); Report (FIFA)

Estádio Nacional Mané Garrincha, Brasília
Attendance: 32,314
Referee: Ryuji Sato (Japan)

10 August 2016
22:00

Denmark	0–4	Brazil
	Report (Rio2016); Report (FIFA)	Gabriel 26', 80'; Jesus 40'; Luan Vieira 50'

Itaipava Arena Fonte Nova, Salvador
Attendance: 41,067
Referee: Alireza Faghani (Iran)

Quarterfinal

13 August 2016
16:00

Nigeria	2–0	Denmark
Mikel 15'; Umar 59'	Report (Rio2016); Report (FIFA)

Itaipava Arena Fonte Nova, Salvador
Attendance: 30,307
Referee: Sandro Ricci (Brazil)

== Golf ==
Denmark has entered four golfers (two per gender) into the Olympic tournament. Søren Kjeldsen (world no. 50), Thorbjørn Olesen (world no. 64), Nicole Broch Larsen (world no. 88), and Nanna Koerstz Madsen (world no. 109) qualified directly among the top 60 eligible players for their respective individual events based on the IGF World Rankings as of 11 July 2016.

Athlete	Event	Round 1	Round 2	Round 3	Round 4	Total		
Athlete	Event	Score	Score	Score	Score	Score	Par	Rank
Søren Kjeldsen	Men's	73	68	70	70	281	−3	=21
Thorbjørn Olesen	Men's	70	68	74	71	283	−1	=30
Nicole Broch Larsen	Women's	67	68	81	71	287	+3	36
Nanna Koerstz Madsen	Women's	69	69	72	69	279	−5	=13

== Handball ==
Summary

Key:
- ET – After extra time
- P – Match decided by penalty-shootout.

Team	Event	Group Stage						Quarterfinal	Semifinal	Final / BM	
Team	Event	Opposition Score	Opposition Score	Opposition Score	Opposition Score	Opposition Score	Rank	Opposition Score	Opposition Score	Opposition Score	Rank
Denmark men's	Men's tournament	Argentina; W 25–19	Tunisia; W 31–23	Croatia; L 24–27	Qatar; W 26–25	France; L 30–33	3	Slovenia; W 37–30	Poland; W 29–28^{ET}	France; W 28–26	1st place, gold medalist(s)

=== Men's tournament ===
Denmark's men's handball team qualified for the Olympics by virtue of a top two finish at the third meet of the Olympic Qualification Tournament in Herning. On 16 July, the team of 14 players and a reserve was nominated by the Danish Handball Federation, for official selection by the NOC.

Team roster

The following is the Danish roster in the men's handball tournament of the 2016 Summer Olympics.

Head coach: (Iceland) Guðmundur Guðmundsson

No.	Pos.	Name	Date of birth (age)	Height	App.	Goals	Club
1	GK	Niklas Landin Jacobsen	19 December 1988 (aged 27)	2.01 m	143	1	(Germany) THW Kiel
3	RB	Mads Christiansen	3 May 1986 (aged 30)	1.94 m	106	234	(Denmark) Bjerringbro-Silkeborg
5	CB	Mads Mensah Larsen	12 August 1991 (aged 24)	1.88 m	67	157	(Germany) Rhein-Neckar Löwen
6	LW	Casper Ulrich Mortensen	14 December 1989 (aged 26)	1.90 m	73	209	(Germany) TSV Hannover-Burgdorf
15	P	Jesper Nøddesbo	23 October 1980 (aged 35)	1.99 m	201	418	(Spain) Barcelona
16	GK	Jannick Green	29 September 1988 (aged 27)	1.95 m	71	1	(Germany) SC Magdeburg
17	RW	Lasse Svan Hansen	31 August 1983 (aged 32)	1.84 m	155	316	(Germany) Flensburg-Handewitt
19	P	Rene Toft Hansen	11 January 1984 (aged 32)	2.00 m	103	163	(Germany) THW Kiel
21	LB	Henrik Møllgaard	2 January 1985 (aged 31)	1.96 m	90	136	(France) Paris Saint-Germain
22	RB	Kasper Søndergaard	9 June 1981 (aged 35)	1.96 m	162	361	(Denmark) Skjern Håndbold
23	P	Henrik Toft Hansen	18 December 1986 (aged 29)	2.00 m	77	144	(Germany) Flensburg-Handewitt
24	LB	Mikkel Hansen	22 October 1987 (aged 28)	1.96 m	151	696	(France) Paris Saint-Germain
25	CB	Morten Olsen	11 October 1984 (aged 31)	1.84 m	32	90	(Germany) TSV Hannover-Burgdorf
27	LB	Michael Damgaard	18 March 1990 (aged 26)	1.92 m	30	78	(Germany) SC Magdeburg

Group play

Pos	Team	Pld	W	D	L	GF	GA	GD	Pts	Qualification
1	Croatia	5	4	0	1	147	134	+13	8 (Note: Croatia 29–28 France)	Quarter-finals
2	France	5	4	0	1	152	126	+26	8	Quarter-finals
3	Denmark	5	3	0	2	136	127	+9	6	Quarter-finals
4	Qatar	5	2	1	2	122	127	−5	5	Quarter-finals
5	Argentina	5	1	0	4	110	126	−16	2	
6	Tunisia	5	0	1	4	118	145	−27	1	

Source: IHF
Rules for classification: 1) Points; 2) Head-to-head points; 3) Head-to-head goal difference; 4) Head-to-head goals scored; 5) Goal difference; 6) Goals scored; 7) Draw.
Notes:

7 August 2016; 14:40	Denmark	25–19	Argentina	Future Arena, Rio de Janeiro; Referees: Lah, Sok (SLO)
7 August 2016; 14:40	Hansen, Svan 6	(10–10)	Simonet 7	Future Arena, Rio de Janeiro; Referees: Lah, Sok (SLO)
7 August 2016; 14:40	3× (yellow card) 4× (suspension) 1× (red card)	Report	3× (yellow card) 3× (suspension)	Future Arena, Rio de Janeiro; Referees: Lah, Sok (SLO)

9 August 2016; 14:40	Tunisia	23–31	Denmark	Future Arena, Rio de Janeiro; Referees: Pinto, Menezes (BRA)
9 August 2016; 14:40	Jallouz 5	(10–16)	Mortensen, Svan 8	Future Arena, Rio de Janeiro; Referees: Pinto, Menezes (BRA)
9 August 2016; 14:40	1× (yellow card) 2× (suspension) 1× (red card)	Report	3× (yellow card) 3× (suspension)	Future Arena, Rio de Janeiro; Referees: Pinto, Menezes (BRA)

11 August 2016; 14:40	Denmark	24–27	Croatia	Future Arena, Rio de Janeiro; Referees: Geipel, Helbig (GER)
11 August 2016; 14:40	Svan Hansen 9	(12–15)	Duvnjak 8	Future Arena, Rio de Janeiro; Referees: Geipel, Helbig (GER)
11 August 2016; 14:40	2× (yellow card) 3× (suspension)	Report	4× (yellow card) 5× (suspension)	Future Arena, Rio de Janeiro; Referees: Geipel, Helbig (GER)

13 August 2016; 14:40	Denmark	26–25	Qatar	Future Arena, Rio de Janeiro; Referees: Rashed, El-Sayed (EGY)
13 August 2016; 14:40	Svan 7	(14–14)	Markovic 7	Future Arena, Rio de Janeiro; Referees: Rashed, El-Sayed (EGY)
13 August 2016; 14:40	4× (yellow card) 5× (suspension)	Report	3× (yellow card) 3× (suspension)	Future Arena, Rio de Janeiro; Referees: Rashed, El-Sayed (EGY)

15 August 2016; 14:40	France	33–30	Denmark	Future Arena, Rio de Janeiro; Referees: Lah, Sok (SLO)
15 August 2016; 14:40	Mahé 9	(17–16)	Hansen 8	Future Arena, Rio de Janeiro; Referees: Lah, Sok (SLO)
15 August 2016; 14:40	2× (yellow card) 3× (suspension)	Report	3× (yellow card) 5× (suspension)	Future Arena, Rio de Janeiro; Referees: Lah, Sok (SLO)

Quarterfinal

17 August 2016; 17:00	Denmark	37–30	Slovenia	Future Arena, Rio de Janeiro; Referees: Lopéz, Ramírez (ESP)
17 August 2016; 17:00	M. Hansen, L. Hansen 8	(16–13)	Bezjak, Janc 6	Future Arena, Rio de Janeiro; Referees: Lopéz, Ramírez (ESP)
17 August 2016; 17:00	3× (yellow card) 5× (suspension)	Report	4× (yellow card) 8× (suspension)	Future Arena, Rio de Janeiro; Referees: Lopéz, Ramírez (ESP)

Semifinal

19 August 2016
20:30
Poland
28–29 (ET)
Denmark
Future Arena, Rio de Janeiro
Referees: Horáček, Novotný (CZE)
Bielecki 7
(15–16)
M. Hansen 10
4× (yellow card) 3× (suspension)
Report
3× (yellow card) 3× (suspension)

FT: 25–25 ET: 3–4

Gold medal match

21 August 2016; 14:00	Denmark	28–26	France	Future Arena, Rio de Janeiro; Referees: López, Ramírez (ESP)
21 August 2016; 14:00	M. Hansen 8	(16–14)	Guigou 6	Future Arena, Rio de Janeiro; Referees: López, Ramírez (ESP)
21 August 2016; 14:00	2× (yellow card) 4× (suspension)	Report	3× (yellow card) 2× (suspension)	Future Arena, Rio de Janeiro; Referees: López, Ramírez (ESP)

== Rowing ==
Denmark has qualified four boats for each of the following rowing classes into the Olympic regatta. Three rowing crews had confirmed Olympic places for their boats each in the men's lightweight four, women's pair, and women's lightweight double sculls at the 2015 FISA World Championships in Lac d'Aiguebelette, France, while the rowers competing in both the women's single and double sculls were added to the Danish roster with their top four finish at the 2016 European & Final Qualification Regatta in Lucerne, Switzerland.

Team Denmark announced the first batch of rowers (men's lightweight four, women's pair, and women's lightweight double sculls) on 12 May 2016. Meanwhile, the remaining crews that earned Olympic spots through the European & Qualification regatta were named to the Danish roster on 14 June 2016. Among the rowers qualifying for the Games were reigning Olympic champions Rasmus Quist Hansen and Mads Rasmussen (men's lightweight double sculls), and London 2012 bronze medalist Fie Udby Erichsen (women's single sculls).

Men

Athlete	Event	Heats		Repechage		Semifinals		Final	
Athlete	Event	Time	Rank	Time	Rank	Time	Rank	Time	Rank
Rasmus Quist Hansen; Mads Rasmussen	Lightweight double sculls	6:33.67	3 R	7:02.78	1 SA/B	6:45.05	5 FB	6:34.72	10
Jacob Barsøe; Kasper Winther Jørgensen; Morten Jørgensen; Jacob Larsen	Lightweight four	5:58.21	1 SA/B	Bye		6:19.62	2 FA	6:21.97	2nd place, silver medalist(s)

Women

Athlete	Event	Heats		Repechage		Quarterfinals		Semifinals		Final	
Athlete	Event	Time	Rank	Time	Rank	Time	Rank	Time	Rank	Time	Rank
Fie Udby Erichsen	Single sculls	8:30.07	2 QF	Bye		7:33.24	1 SA/B	8:08.65	6 FB	7:25.13	9
Anne Dsane Andersen; Hedvig Rasmussen	Pair	7:05.28	2 SA/B	Bye		—N/a		7:27.56	1 FA	7:20.71	3rd place, bronze medalist(s)
Nina Hollensen; Lisbet Jakobsen	Double sculls	7:18.92	5 R	7:04.35	4	—N/a		Did not advance			
Anne Lolk; Juliane Elander Rasmussen	Lightweight double sculls	7:01.84	2 SA/B	Bye		—N/a		7:20.29	4 FB	7:27.36	9

Qualification Legend: FA=Final A (medal); FB=Final B (non-medal); FC=Final C (non-medal); FD=Final D (non-medal); FE=Final E (non-medal); FF=Final F (non-medal); SA/B=Semifinals A/B; SC/D=Semifinals C/D; SE/F=Semifinals E/F; QF=Quarterfinals; R=Repechage

== Sailing ==
Danish sailors have qualified one boat in each of the following classes through the 2014 ISAF Sailing World Championships, the individual fleet Worlds, and European qualifying regattas. Team Denmark will determine the official list of sailors with the highest overall series score having accumulated in three selection trial meets of each fleet.

On 4 March 2016, four sailors had been selected to the Danish Olympic team for Rio: skiff duo Jena Mai Hansen and Katja Salskov-Iversen (49erFX), and multihull tandem Anette Viborg Andreasen and 2012 Olympian Allan Nørregaard (Nacra 17). Single-handed sailors Michael Hansen (Laser) and 2012 Finn silver medalist Jonas Høgh Christensen had claimed their Olympic spots at the Princess Sofia Trophy Regatta, while the remaining crews rounded out the selection at the ISAF World Cup meet in Hyeres, France.

Men

Athlete	Event	Race													Net points	Final rank
Athlete	Event	1	2	3	4	5	6	7	8	9	10	11	12	M*	Net points	Final rank
Sebastian Fleischer	RS:X	15	14	9	12	~~22~~	11	17	20	2	11	6	18	EL	135	12
Michael Hansen	Laser	6	24	23	20	~~31~~	31	19	26	5	26	—N/a		EL	180	25
Jonas Høgh Christensen	Finn	13	2	4	~~DNF~~	10	11	16	16	17	21	—N/a		EL	110	17
Christian Peter Lübeck; Jonas Warrer	49er	8	9	~~21~~	15	1	5	6	13	14	18	1	2	6	98	4

Women

Athlete	Event	Race													Net points	Final rank
Athlete	Event	1	2	3	4	5	6	7	8	9	10	11	12	M*	Net points	Final rank
Lærke Buhl-Hansen	RS:X	17	16	17	20	16	13	12	9	~~21~~	13	10	12	EL	155	15
Anne-Marie Rindom	Laser Radial	5	8	~~DSQ~~	3	3	1	4	6	22	3	—N/a		16	55	3rd place, bronze medalist(s)
Jena Mai Hansen; Katja Salskov-Iversen	49erFX	~~21~~	2	2	2	4	2	9	16	2	1	2	4	8	54	3rd place, bronze medalist(s)

Mixed

Athlete	Event	Race													Net points	Final rank
Athlete	Event	1	2	3	4	5	6	7	8	9	10	11	12	M*	Net points	Final rank
Allan Nørregaard; Anette Viborg Andreasen	Nacra 17	8	8	9	14	10	12	~~17~~	9	7	11	5	15	EL	108	12

M = Medal race; EL = Eliminated – did not advance into the medal race

== Shooting ==
Danish shooters have achieved quota places for the following events by virtue of their best finishes at the 2014 and 2015 ISSF World Championships, the 2015 ISSF World Cup series, and European Championships or Games, as long as they obtained a minimum qualifying score (MQS) by 31 March 2016.

On 5 November 2015, Team Denmark had officially announced the shooting squad for the Games.

Athlete	Event	Qualification		Semifinal		Final	
Athlete	Event	Points	Rank	Points	Rank	Points	Rank
Torben Grimmel	Men's 50 m rifle prone	621.4	23	—N/a		Did not advance	
Jesper Hansen	Men's skeet	121 (+12)	=5 Q	14 (+3)	=5	Did not advance	
Stine Nielsen	Women's 10 m air rifle	410.1	38	—N/a		Did not advance	
Stine Nielsen	Women's 50 m rifle 3 positions	579	13	—N/a		Did not advance	

Qualification Legend: Q = Qualify for the next round; q = Qualify for the bronze medal (shotgun)

== Swimming ==
Danish swimmers have so far achieved qualifying standards in the following events (up to a maximum of 2 swimmers in each event at the Olympic Qualifying Time (OQT), and potentially 1 at the Olympic Selection Time (OST)): To qualify for the individual events, swimmers must achieve times set by the Danish Swimming Federation and the Danish NOC at either the 2015 World Aquatics Championships, the 2016 Danish Open or the 2016 European Aquatics Championships.

On 4 November 2015, five swimmers had been officially chosen to be part of the Danish Olympic team for the Games, including current world-record holder Rikke Møller Pedersen in the breaststroke, and 2008 Olympic bronze medalist Lotte Friis in long-distance freestyle. Four more swimmers (Glæsner, Ipsen, Joensen, and Blume), along with the members of the men's 4 × 200 m freestyle relay team, were officially named to the Danish roster on 10 May 2016, extending the swimming team size to thirteen.

Men

Athlete	Event	Heat		Semifinal		Final	
Athlete	Event	Time	Rank	Time	Rank	Time	Rank
Viktor Bromer	200 m butterfly	1:55.77	7 Q	1:55.59	7 Q	1:55.64	6
Mads Glæsner	400 m freestyle	3:52.59	36	—N/a		Did not advance	
Anton Ipsen	400 m freestyle	3:48.31	20	—N/a		Did not advance	
Anton Ipsen	1500 m freestyle	15:05.91	18	—N/a		Did not advance	
Pál Joensen	1500 m freestyle	15:18.49	30	—N/a		Did not advance	
Søren Dahl; Anders Lie; Daniel Skaaning; Magnus Westermann	4 × 200 m freestyle relay	7:12.66	13	—N/a		Did not advance	

Women

Athlete	Event	Heat		Semifinal		Final	
Athlete	Event	Time	Rank	Time	Rank	Time	Rank
Pernille Blume	50 m freestyle	24.23	1 Q	24.28	1 Q	24.07	1st place, gold medalist(s)
Pernille Blume	100 m freestyle	54.15	11 Q	54.19	11	Did not advance	
Lotte Friis	400 m freestyle	4:07.13	11	—N/a		Did not advance	
Lotte Friis	800 m freestyle	8:22.54	5 Q	—N/a		8:24.50	7
Mie Nielsen	100 m backstroke	59.13	4 Q	59.18	6 Q	58.80	5
Jeanette Ottesen	50 m freestyle	24.48	=5 Q	24.62	11	Did not advance	
Jeanette Ottesen	100 m freestyle	53.53	5 Q	53.35	6 Q	53.36	8
Jeanette Ottesen	100 m butterfly	57.15	6 Q	57.47	7 Q	57.17	7
Rikke Møller Pedersen	100 m breaststroke	1:06.58	6 Q	1:07.07	10	Did not advance	
Rikke Møller Pedersen	200 m breaststroke	2:22.72	1 Q	2:22.45	5 Q	2:23.74	8
Pernille Blume; Sarah Bro; Julie Kepp Jensen; Mie Nielsen	4 × 100 m freestyle relay	3:39.45	12	—N/a		Did not advance	
Pernille Blume; Mie Nielsen; Jeanette Ottesen; Rikke Møller Pedersen	4 × 100 m medley relay	3:56.98	3 Q	—N/a		3:55.01 EU	3rd place, bronze medalist(s)

== Table tennis ==
Denmark has entered one athlete into the table tennis competition at the Games. Jonathan Groth secured one of the remaining Olympic spots in the men's singles by winning the repechage group final at the European Qualification Tournament in Halmstad, Sweden.

Athlete	Event	Preliminary	Round 1	Round 2	Round 3	Round of 16	Quarterfinals	Semifinals	Final / BM	
Athlete	Event	Opposition Result	Opposition Result	Opposition Result	Opposition Result	Opposition Result	Opposition Result	Opposition Result	Opposition Result	Rank
Jonathan Groth	Men's singles	Bye		Oláh (FIN); W 4–0	Ma L (CHN); L 0–4	Did not advance				

== Tennis ==
Denmark has entered one tennis player into the Olympic tournament. London 2012 Olympian Caroline Wozniacki (world no. 34) qualified directly for the women's singles as one of the top 56 eligible players in the WTA World Rankings as of 6 June 2016.

Athlete	Event	Round of 64	Round of 32	Round of 16	Quarterfinals	Semifinals	Final / BM	
Athlete	Event	Opposition Score	Opposition Score	Opposition Score	Opposition Score	Opposition Score	Opposition Score	Rank
Caroline Wozniacki	Women's singles	Hradecká (CZE); W 6–2, 6–2	Kvitková (CZE); L 2–6, 4–6	Did not advance				

== Triathlon ==
Denmark has entered one triathlete to compete at the Games. Andreas Schilling was ranked among the top 43 eligible triathletes in the men's event based on the ITU Olympic Qualification List as of 15 May 2016.

Athlete	Event	Swim (1.5 km)	Trans 1	Bike (40 km)	Trans 2	Run (10 km)	Total Time	Rank
Andreas Schilling	Men's	18:11	0:48	55:33	0:38	33:46	1:48:56	28

== Wrestling ==
Denmark has qualified one wrestler for the men's Greco-Roman 75 kg into the Olympic competition, as a result of his top six finish at the 2015 World Championships.

Key:
- VT – Victory by fall.
- PP – Decision by points – the loser with technical points.
- PO – Decision by points – the loser without technical points.
- ST – Great superiority – the loser without technical points and a margin of victory of at least 8 (Greco-Roman) or 10 (freestyle) points.

Men's Greco-Roman

Athlete	Event	Qualification	Round of 16	Quarterfinal	Semifinal	Repechage 1	Repechage 2	Final / BM	
Athlete	Event	Opposition Result	Opposition Result	Opposition Result	Opposition Result	Opposition Result	Opposition Result	Opposition Result	Rank
Mark Madsen	−75 kg	Bye	Abdevali (IRI); W 3–1 ^{PP}	Nemeš (SRB); W 3–0 ^{PO}	Bácsi (HUN); W 3–0 ^{PO}	Bye		Vlasov (RUS); L 1–3 ^{PP}	2nd place, silver medalist(s)

== See also ==
- Denmark at the 2016 Summer Paralympics
