= 2015 World Wrestling Championships – Men's Greco-Roman 75 kg =

Men's Greco-Roman 75 kg at the 2015 World Championships
- Venue: Orleans Arena
- Dates: 7 September 2015
- Competitors: 46 from 46 nations

Medalists
gold medal	Roman Vlasov	Russia
silver medal	Mark Madsen	Denmark
bronze medal	Andy Bisek	United States
bronze medal	Doszhan Kartikov	Kazakhstan

The men's Greco-Roman 75 kilograms is a competition featured at the 2015 World Wrestling Championships, and was held in Las Vegas, United States on 7 September 2015.

== Results ==
Legend

- F — Won by fall

=== Finals ===
Semifinals		Final
Mark Madsen (DEN)	2
Saeid Abdevali (IRI)	2	Mark Madsen (DEN)	0
Elvin Mursaliyev (AZE)	0	Roman Vlasov (RUS)	6
Roman Vlasov (RUS)	6

=== Top half ===
==== Section 1 ====
Round of 64

Round of 32
Mark Madsen (DEN)	5
Yavor Yanakiev (BUL)	1
Richard Rigó (SVK)	0
Tarek Abdelsalam (EGY)	2
Luis Avendaño (VEN)	2
Andy Bisek (USA)	5
Gurpreet Singh (IND)	10
Alvis Almendra (PAN)	2

Round of 16
Mark Madsen (DEN)	4
Tarek Abdelsalam (EGY)	2
Andy Bisek (USA)	6
Gurpreet Singh (IND)	4

Quarterfinals
Mark Madsen (DEN)	9
Andy Bisek (USA)	0

==== Section 2 ====
Round of 64

Round of 32
Aleksandrs Višņakovs (LAT)	0
Zurabi Datunashvili (GEO)	3
Micah Lopez (GUM)	0
Yang Bin (CHN)	9
Rabbia Khalil (PLE)	0
Pascal Eisele (GER)	4^{F}
Saeid Abdevali (IRI)	8
Nurbek Khashimbekov (UZB)	0

Round of 16
Zurabi Datunashvili (GEO)	3
Yang Bin (CHN)	0
Pascal Eisele (GER)	0
Saeid Abdevali (IRI)	10

Quarterfinals
Zurabi Datunashvili (GEO)	0
Saeid Abdevali (IRI)	2

=== Bottom half ===
==== Section 3 ====
Round of 64
Mateusz Wolny (POL)	1
Takehiro Kanakubo (JPN)	0
Riccardo Abbrescia (ITA)	0
Božo Starčević (CRO)	8
Khalid Sahli (MAR)	0
Ilie Cojocari (ROU)	5
Robert Rosengren (SWE)	8^{F}
Petros Manouilidis (GRE)	0
Luis Centeno (PUR)	0
Jure Kuhar (SLO)	8
Elvin Mursaliyev (AZE)	3
Juan Ángel Escobar (MEX)	2

Round of 32
Henri Välimäki (FIN)	0
Atabek Azisbekov (KGZ)	8
Mateusz Wolny (POL)	0
Božo Starčević (CRO)	1
Ilie Cojocari (ROU)	3
Robert Rosengren (SWE)	0
Jure Kuhar (SLO)	2
Elvin Mursaliyev (AZE)	3

Round of 16
Atabek Azisbekov (KGZ)	9
Božo Starčević (CRO)	8
Ilie Cojocari (ROU)	1
Elvin Mursaliyev (AZE)	5

Quarterfinals
Atabek Azisbekov (KGZ)	0
Elvin Mursaliyev (AZE)	8

==== Section 4 ====
Round of 64
Carlos Muñoz (COL)	0
Péter Bácsi (HUN)	8
Emrah Kuş (TUR)	3
Valery Palenski (BLR)	4
Roman Vlasov (RUS)	6
Arsen Julfalakyan (ARM)	0
Şermet Permanow (TKM)	3
Petr Novák (CZE)	11
Jonas Bossert (SUI)	0
Kim Hyeon-woo (KOR)	8
Viktor Nemeš (SRB)	5
Florian Marchl (AUT)	0
Igor Beşleaga (MDA)	4^{F}
Ângelo Moreira (BRA)	4
Doszhan Kartikov (KAZ)	4
Dmytro Pyshkov (UKR)	2

Round of 32
Péter Bácsi (HUN)	5
Valery Palenski (BLR)	0
Roman Vlasov (RUS)	10
Petr Novák (CZE)	0
Kim Hyeon-woo (KOR)	3
Viktor Nemeš (SRB)	2
Igor Beşleaga (MDA)	0
Doszhan Kartikov (KAZ)	6

Round of 16
Péter Bácsi (HUN)	0
Roman Vlasov (RUS)	5
Kim Hyeon-woo (KOR)	2
Doszhan Kartikov (KAZ)	4

Quarterfinals
Roman Vlasov (RUS)	7
Doszhan Kartikov (KAZ)	0

=== Repechage ===
Repechage round 1
Arsen Julfalakyan (ARM)	8
Petr Novák (CZE)	0

Repechage round 2
Yavor Yanakiev (BUL)	5
Tarek Abdelsalam (EGY)	0
Arsen Julfalakyan (ARM)	7
Péter Bácsi (HUN)	4

Repechage round 3
Yavor Yanakiev (BUL)	0
Andy Bisek (USA)	1
Arsen Julfalakyan (ARM)	2
Doszhan Kartikov (KAZ)	5

Bronze medals
Andy Bisek (USA)	2
Saeid Abdevali (IRI)	0
Doszhan Kartikov (KAZ)	1
Elvin Mursaliyev (AZE)	0
