= 2014 World Wrestling Championships – Men's Greco-Roman 75 kg =

Men's Greco-Roman 75 kg at the 2014 World Championships
- Venue: Gymnastics Sport Palace
- Dates: 12 September 2014
- Competitors: 39 from 39 nations

Medalists
gold medal	Arsen Julfalakyan	Armenia
silver medal	Neven Žugaj	Croatia
bronze medal	Andy Bisek	United States
bronze medal	Elvin Mursaliyev	Azerbaijan

The Men's Greco-Roman 75 kilograms is a competition featured at the 2014 World Wrestling Championships, and was held in Tashkent, Uzbekistan on 12 September 2014.

== Results ==
Legend

- F — Won by fall

=== Finals ===
Semifinals		Final
Hiroyuki Shimizu (JPN)	0
Neven Žugaj (CRO)	2	Neven Žugaj (CRO)	0
Arsen Julfalakyan (ARM)	1	Arsen Julfalakyan (ARM)	4
Zurabi Datunashvili (GEO)	0

=== Top half ===
==== Section 1 ====
Round of 64

Round of 32
Hiroyuki Shimizu (JPN)	4
Şeref Tüfenk (TUR)	2
Damian Dietsche (SUI)	6
Igor Beşleaga (MDA)	13
Florian Neumaier (GER)	0
László Szabó (HUN)	4
Nurullo Khasanov (TJK)	0
Dmytro Pyshkov (UKR)	11

Round of 16
Hiroyuki Shimizu (JPN)	4
Igor Beşleaga (MDA)	1
László Szabó (HUN)	4
Dmytro Pyshkov (UKR)	4

Quarterfinals
Hiroyuki Shimizu (JPN)	5
Dmytro Pyshkov (UKR)	5

==== Section 2 ====
Round of 64

Round of 32
Hadi Alizadeh (IRI)	4
Nurbek Khashimbekov (UZB)	0
Neven Žugaj (CRO)	3
Veli-Karri Suominen (FIN)	1
Andy Bisek (USA)	5
Petros Manouilidis (GRE)	0
Roman Vlasov (RUS)	10
Richard Rigó (SVK)	0

Round of 16
Hadi Alizadeh (IRI)	3
Neven Žugaj (CRO)	8
Andy Bisek (USA)	6
Roman Vlasov (RUS)	6

Quarterfinals
Neven Žugaj (CRO)	1
Andy Bisek (USA)	0

=== Bottom half ===
==== Section 3 ====
Round of 64

Round of 32
Elvin Mursaliyev (AZE)	0
Arsen Julfalakyan (ARM)	9
Ciro Russo (ITA)	0
Florian Marchl (AUT)	11
Maximiliano Prudenzano (ARG)	1
Li Xifeng (CHN)	2
Robert Rosengren (SWE)	1
Juan Ángel Escobar (MEX)	7

Round of 16
Arsen Julfalakyan (ARM)	12
Florian Marchl (AUT)	1
Li Xifeng (CHN)	0
Juan Ángel Escobar (MEX)	8

Quarterfinals
Arsen Julfalakyan (ARM)	11
Juan Ángel Escobar (MEX)	2

==== Section 4 ====
Round of 64
Amanaly Ataýew (TKM)	6
Gurpreet Singh (IND)	8
Aleksandrs Višņakovs (LAT)	0
Petr Novák (CZE)	4
Park Dae-seung (KOR)	2
Jure Kuhar (SLO)	2
Yavor Yanakiev (BUL)	3
Viktor Nemeš (SRB)	0
Yorgen Cova (VEN)	5
Rashid Kochiyev (KAZ)	0
Arkadiusz Kułynycz (POL)	0
Zurabi Datunashvili (GEO)	8
Tarek Abdelsalam (EGY)	1
Valery Palenski (BLR)	10

Round of 32
Ricardo Gil (ESP)	4
Gurpreet Singh (IND)	12
Petr Novák (CZE)	9
Park Dae-seung (KOR)	3
Yavor Yanakiev (BUL)	5
Yorgen Cova (VEN)	0
Zurabi Datunashvili (GEO)	4
Valery Palenski (BLR)	2

Round of 16
Gurpreet Singh (IND)	9^{F}
Petr Novák (CZE)	2
Yavor Yanakiev (BUL)	2
Zurabi Datunashvili (GEO)	2

Quarterfinals
Gurpreet Singh (IND)	5
Zurabi Datunashvili (GEO)	7

=== Repechage ===
Repechage round 2
Veli-Karri Suominen (FIN)	6
Hadi Alizadeh (IRI)	2
Elvin Mursaliyev (AZE)	5^{F}
Florian Marchl (AUT)	0

Repechage round 3
Veli-Karri Suominen (FIN)	5
Andy Bisek (USA)	6
Elvin Mursaliyev (AZE)	4
Juan Ángel Escobar (MEX)	1

Bronze medals
Andy Bisek (USA)	8
Hiroyuki Shimizu (JPN)	0
Elvin Mursaliyev (AZE)	1
Zurabi Datunashvili (GEO)	1
