= 2014 Grand Prix Zagreb Open =

Wrestling event held in Zagreb, Croatia

- Host city: Zagreb, Croatia
- Dates: 8–9 February 2014
- Stadium: Dom Sportova

The 2014 Grand Prix Zagreb Open, was a wrestling event held in Zagreb, Croatia between 8–9 February 2014.

== Medal table ==
Rank	Nation	Gold	Silver	Bronze	Total
1	Croatia	4	1	6	11
2	Serbia	2	4	3	9
3	Czech Republic	1	2	4	7
4	Slovenia	1	0	1	2
5	Hungary	0	1	0	1
6	Bosnia and Herzegovina	0	0	1	1
6	Ukraine	0	0	1	1
Totals (7 entries)		8	8	16	32

== Team ranking ==
Rank	Men's Greco-Roman	
Rank	Team	Points
1	Croatia	139
2	Serbia	109
3	Czech Republic	66
4	Slovakia	28
5	Hungary	19

== Greco-Roman ==
Event	Gold	Silver	Bronze
59 kg	Ivan Lizatović; Croatia	Dragan Dešić; Serbia	Michal Novák; Czech Republic
59 kg	Ivan Lizatović; Croatia	Dragan Dešić; Serbia	Kristijan Šimatić; Croatia
66 kg	Davor Štefanek; Serbia	Filip Dubský; Czech Republic	Matous Morbitzer; Czech Republic
66 kg	Davor Štefanek; Serbia	Filip Dubský; Czech Republic	Dominik Etlinger; Croatia
71 kg	Mate Nemeš; Serbia	Aleksandar Maksimović; Serbia	Tomáš Sobecký; Czech Republic
71 kg	Mate Nemeš; Serbia	Aleksandar Maksimović; Serbia	Danijel Janečić; Croatia
75 kg	Jure Kuhar; Slovenia	Petr Novak; Czech Republic	Timotej Trbulin; Slovenia
75 kg	Jure Kuhar; Slovenia	Petr Novak; Czech Republic	Viktor Nemeš; Serbia
80 kg	Neven Žugaj; Croatia	Tomislav Mičuda; Croatia	Milan Todorovic; Serbia
80 kg	Neven Žugaj; Croatia	Tomislav Mičuda; Croatia	Pavel Powada; Czech Republic
85 kg	Artur Omarov; Czech Republic	Petar Balo; Serbia	Sergii Severyn; Ukraine
85 kg	Artur Omarov; Czech Republic	Petar Balo; Serbia	Krešimir Franić; Croatia
98 kg	Siniša Hogač; Croatia	Vasilije Govedarica; Serbia	Elvir Ćosić; Bosnia and Herzegovina
98 kg	Siniša Hogač; Croatia	Vasilije Govedarica; Serbia	Tomislav Lavrić; Croatia
130 kg	Stjepan Lavri; Croatia	Juszup Nunajev; Hungary	Anton Đok; Croatia
130 kg	Stjepan Lavri; Croatia	Juszup Nunajev; Hungary	Nemanja Pavlović; Serbia

== Participating nations ==
57 competitors from 7 nations participated.

- Bosnia and Herzegovina (2)
- Croatia (20)
- Czech Republic (8)
- Hungary (3)
- Serbia (15)
- Slovakia (5)
- Slovenia (2)
- Ukraine (2)
