= Wrestling at the 2012 Summer Olympics – Men's Greco-Roman 74 kg =

Men's Greco-Roman 74 kg at the Games of the XXX Olympiad
- Venue: ExCeL London
- Date: 5 August 2012
- Competitors: 19 from 19 nations

Medalists
1st place, gold medalist(s)		Roman Vlasov	Russia
2nd place, silver medalist(s)		Arsen Julfalakyan	Armenia
3rd place, bronze medalist(s)		Aleksandr Kazakevič	Lithuania
3rd place, bronze medalist(s)		Emin Ahmadov	Azerbaijan

Men's Greco-Roman 74 kilograms competition at the 2012 Summer Olympics in London, United Kingdom, took place on 5 August at ExCeL London.

This Greco-Roman wrestling competition consists of a single-elimination tournament, with a repechage used to determine the winner of two bronze medals. The two finalists face off for gold and silver medals. Each wrestler who loses to one of the two finalists moves into the repechage, culminating in a pair of bronze medal matches featuring the semifinal losers each facing the remaining repechage opponent from their half of the bracket.

Each bout consists of up to three rounds, lasting two minutes apiece. The wrestler who scores more points in each round is the winner of that rounds; the bout ends when one wrestler has won two rounds (and thus the match).

== Schedule ==
All times are British Summer Time (UTC+01:00)

Date	Time	Event
5 August 2012	13:00	Qualification rounds
5 August 2012	17:45	Repechage
5 August 2012	18:45	Finals

== Results ==
Legend

- R — Retired

=== Final ===
Final
Roman Vlasov (RUS)	1	1
Arsen Julfalakyan (ARM)	0	0

=== Top half ===
Qualifications

1/8 finals
Aleksandr Kazakevič (LTU)	0	1	0
Péter Bácsi (HUN)	1	0	0^{R}
Selçuk Çebi (TUR)	0	1	0
Robert Rosengren (SWE)	1	0	1
Mark Madsen (DEN)	2	0	0
Roman Vlasov (RUS)	0	3	2
Christophe Guénot (FRA)	3	2
Zied Ayet Ikram (TUN)	0	0

1/4 finals
Aleksandr Kazakevič (LTU)	0	2	1
Robert Rosengren (SWE)	1	0	0
Roman Vlasov (RUS)	2	0	1
Christophe Guénot (FRA)	0	2	0

Semifinals
Aleksandr Kazakevič (LTU)	0	0
Roman Vlasov (RUS)	3	1

=== Bottom half ===
Qualifications
Islam Tolba (EGY)	0	0
Neven Žugaj (CRO)	1	3
Alexei Bell (CUB)	3	0	0
Ben Provisor (USA)	0	1	1
Zurabi Datunashvili (GEO)	5	1
Kim Jin-hyeok (KOR)	0	0

1/8 finals
Arsen Julfalakyan (ARM)	1	1
Daniar Kobonov (KGZ)	0	0
Askhat Dilmukhamedov (KAZ)	0	0
Aliaksandr Kikiniou (BLR)	1	2
Emin Ahmadov (AZE)	4	1
Neven Žugaj (CRO)	0	0
Ben Provisor (USA)	0	0
Zurabi Datunashvili (GEO)	1	6

1/4 finals
Arsen Julfalakyan (ARM)	2	1
Aliaksandr Kikiniou (BLR)	0	0
Emin Ahmadov (AZE)	0	3	4
Zurabi Datunashvili (GEO)	2	0	0

Semifinals
Arsen Julfalakyan (ARM)	2	3
Emin Ahmadov (AZE)	0	0

=== Repechage ===
Repechage round 2
Mark Madsen (DEN)	3	1
Christophe Guénot (FRA)	2	0
Daniar Kobonov (KGZ)	0	0
Aliaksandr Kikiniou (BLR)	1	2

Bronze medals
Mark Madsen (DEN)	0	0
Aleksandr Kazakevič (LTU)	2	2
Aliaksandr Kikiniou (BLR)	2	0	0
Emin Ahmadov (AZE)	0	2	2

== Final standing ==
Rank	Athlete
1st place, gold medalist(s)	Roman Vlasov (RUS)
2nd place, silver medalist(s)	Arsen Julfalakyan (ARM)
3rd place, bronze medalist(s)	Aleksandr Kazakevič (LTU)
3rd place, bronze medalist(s)	Emin Ahmadov (AZE)
5	Mark Madsen (DEN)
5	Aliaksandr Kikiniou (BLR)
7	Zurabi Datunashvili (GEO)
8	Christophe Guénot (FRA)
9	Robert Rosengren (SWE)
10	Neven Žugaj (CRO)
11	Ben Provisor (USA)
12	Alexei Bell (CUB)
13	Selçuk Çebi (TUR)
14	Péter Bácsi (HUN)
15	Askhat Dilmukhamedov (KAZ)
16	Islam Tolba (EGY)
17	Zied Ayet Ikram (TUN)
17	Daniar Kobonov (KGZ)
19	Kim Jin-hyeok (KOR)
