= Alexei Bell (wrestler) =

Cuban Greco-Roman wrestler

Personal information
- Nationality: Cuba
- Born: 18 June 1990 (age 36) Camagüey, Cuba
- Weight: 74 kg (163 lb)

Sport
- Sport: Wrestling
- Event: Greco-Roman

Alexei Bell Caballero (born June 18, 1990) is an amateur Cuban Greco-Roman wrestler, who played for the men's middleweight category.

Bell represented Cuba at the 2012 Summer Olympics in London, where he competed for the men's 74 kg class. Bell, however, was defeated by Provisor in their re-match during the qualification rounds of the event, with a three-set technical score (3–0, 0–1, 0–1), and a classification point score of 1–3.
