= 2015 World Wrestling Championships – Men's freestyle 61 kg =

World Wrestling competition

Men's freestyle 61 kg at the 2015 World Championships
- Venue: Orleans Arena
- Dates: 11 September 2015
- Competitors: 23 from 23 nations

Medalists
gold medal	Haji Aliyev	Azerbaijan
silver medal	Batboldyn Nomin	Mongolia
bronze medal	Vladimir Dubov	Bulgaria
bronze medal	Vasyl Shuptar	Ukraine

The men's freestyle 61 kilograms is a competition featured at the 2015 World Wrestling Championships, and was held in Las Vegas, United States on 11 September.

This freestyle wrestling competition consisted of a single-elimination tournament, with a repechage used to determine the winners of two bronze medals.

== Results ==
Legend

- F — Won by fall

=== Final ===
Final
Haji Aliyev (AZE)	10
Batboldyn Nomin (MGL)	0

=== Top half ===
Round of 32

Round of 16
Ramil Rejepow (TKM)	0
Vladimir Dubov (BUL)	5
Emrach Gasanov (ISR)	8
Valodya Frangulyan (ARM)	18
Andrei Prepeliţă (MDA)	2
Haji Aliyev (AZE)	11
Jasin Redjalari (MKD)	0
Masakazu Kamoi (JPN)	10

Quarterfinals
Vladimir Dubov (BUL)	14
Valodya Frangulyan (ARM)	7
Haji Aliyev (AZE)	6
Masakazu Kamoi (JPN)	2

Semifinals
Vladimir Dubov (BUL)	2
Haji Aliyev (AZE)	6

=== Bottom half ===
Round of 32
Münir Recep Aktaş (TUR)	5
Mykola Bolotňuk (SVK)	4
Michael Asselstine (CAN)	0
Aleksandr Bogomoev (RUS)	10
Vasyl Shuptar (UKR)	10^{F}
Behnam Ehsanpour (IRI)	6
Kemmy Betwell (MHL)	0
Yang Jae-hoon (KOR)	12
Cristian Nicolescu (PLW)	0
Beka Lomtadze (GEO)	12
Batboldyn Nomin (MGL)	10
Bajrang Punia (IND)	0
Reece Humphrey (USA)	11
Daulet Niyazbekov (KAZ)	11

Round of 16
Tian Zhenguang (CHN)	1
Münir Recep Aktaş (TUR)	10
Aleksandr Bogomoev (RUS)	3
Vasyl Shuptar (UKR)	4
Yang Jae-hoon (KOR)	4
Beka Lomtadze (GEO)	6
Batboldyn Nomin (MGL)	6
Reece Humphrey (USA)	0

Quarterfinals
Münir Recep Aktaş (TUR)	0
Vasyl Shuptar (UKR)	2
Beka Lomtadze (GEO)	5
Batboldyn Nomin (MGL)	10

Semifinals
Vasyl Shuptar (UKR)	4
Batboldyn Nomin (MGL)	8

=== Repechage ===
Repechage round 1
Bajrang Punia (IND)	6^{F}
Reece Humphrey (USA)	0

Repechage round 2
Andrei Prepeliţă (MDA)	7
Masakazu Kamoi (JPN)	8
Bajrang Punia (IND)	13^{F}
Beka Lomtadze (GEO)	6

Bronze medals
Masakazu Kamoi (JPN)	2
Vladimir Dubov (BUL)	3
Bajrang Punia (IND)	6
Vasyl Shuptar (UKR)	6
