= Arsen Julfalakyan =

Armenian Greco-Roman wrestler

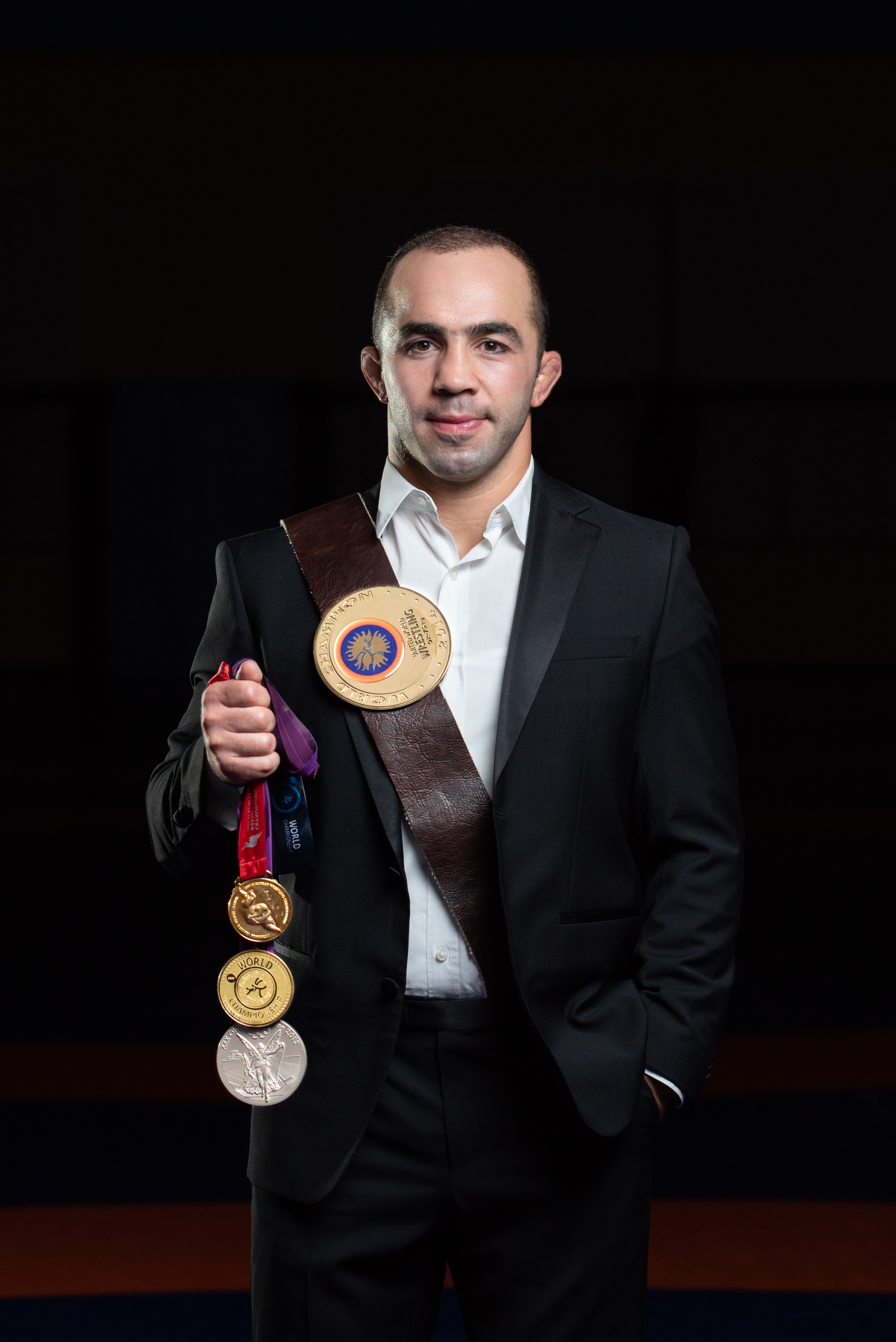
- Julfalakyan in 2021

Personal information
- Born: 8 May 1987 (age 39) Leninakan, Armenia
- Height: 1.70 m (5 ft 7 in)
- Weight: 74 kg (163 lb)

Sport
- Country: Argentina
- Sport: Wrestling
- Position: United World Wrestling Bureau Member
- Event: Greco-Roman
- Club: KSV Aalen
- Coached by: Aram Gasparyan; Aram Julfalakyan
Medal record
Men's Greco-Roman wrestling
Representing Armenia
Olympic Games
Silver medal – second place	2012 London	74 kg
World Championships
Gold medal – first place	2014 Tashkent	75 kg
Silver medal – second place	2010 Moscow	74 kg
Bronze medal – third place	2011 Istanbul	74 kg
Bronze medal – third place	2013 Budapest	74 kg
European Championships
Gold medal – first place	2009 Vilnius	74 kg
Silver medal – second place	2014 Vantaa	75 kg
Bronze medal – third place	2012 Belgrade	74 kg
Bronze medal – third place	2019 Bucharest	77 kg
World Cup
Bronze medal – third place	2009 Clermont-Ferrand	74 kg
Gold medal – first place	2010 Yerevan	74 kg
Summer Universiade
Bronze medal – third place	2013 Kazan	74 kg
Representing Argentina
Pan American Championships
Silver medal – second place	2025 Monterrey	77 kg
South American Games
Gold medal – first place	2026 Santa Fe	77 kg

Arsen Julfalakyan (Armenian: Արսեն Ջուլֆալակյան, born 8 May 1987) is a Greco-Roman style wrestler, Olympic silver medalist, World and European Champion, World Cup winner and three-time Olympian. Born in Armenia, which he represented in most of his career, he competes for Argentina.

== Early life ==
Julfalakyan was born in the city of Leninakan (now Gyumri), Armenia. He is the son of renowned European, World and Olympic Champion, Armenian national Greco-Roman wrestling team head coach Levon Julfalakyan. Under the guidance of his father, Arsen began wrestling at age 11.

== Career ==
In the years 2001, 2003, and 2004, Julfalakyan won the Junior Armenian Championship, and won the Cadet European Championships in 2003 and 2004 and the Junior World Championships in 2007.

Arsen, age 21, competed at the 2008 Summer Olympics. He was eliminated in his second match, coming in tenth place.

Julfalakyan was a member of the Armenian Greco-Roman wrestling team at the 2009 Wrestling World Cup. The Armenian team came in third place. Julfalakyan personally won a bronze medal.

Julfalakyan won the gold medal at the 2009 European Wrestling Championships in Vilnius and the silver medal in the 2010 World Wrestling Championships in Moscow.

Julfalakyan was a member of the Armenian Greco-Roman wrestling team at the 2010 Wrestling World Cup. The Armenian team came in third place. Julfalakyan personally won a gold medal.

Arsen made his Olympic return at the 2012 Summer Olympics. He advanced to the finals without losing a single point, but faced defeat in the finals against Roman Vlasov in a tensely contested match. Vlasov called Julfalakyan his idol afterwards. Julfalakyan won an Olympic silver medal, the first Olympic silver medal won by an Armenian representative in sixteen-years. At the closing ceremony, Julfalakyan was the flag bearer of Armenia. Julfalakyan was voted the Armenian Athlete of the Year for 2012.

Julfalakyan won the gold medal at the 2014 World Wrestling Championships, the first for Armenia in Greco-Roman wrestling in 13 years. In the 2014 Grapple at the Garden in New York City, Julfalakyan defeated 4-time NCAA champion Kyle Dake in a Greco-Roman match. He won the "Dan Kolov and Nikola Petrov" international tournament in Sofia on 24 April and dedicated his victory to the victims of the Armenian genocide on the 100th anniversary, wearing a shirt commemorating the 1.5 million victims during the medal presentation.

He competed at the 2016 Summer Olympics but lost in the first round and didn't move onto the repechage.

In 2024, he competed at the Pan American Wrestling Olympic Qualification Tournament held in Acapulco, Mexico hoping to qualify for the 2024 Summer Olympics in Paris, France. Due to a serious injury(tendon retraction), he was eliminated in his second match.

== Personal life ==
Julfalakyan got married on 27 August 2012 in the St. Gevorg Church in Mughni.

Arsen studied at Yerevan State University and received an International Relations faculty master's degree and PhD in History.

In 2021 Arsen Julfalakyan was elected as a Chairman of the United World Wrestling Athletes’ Commission. He serves also as UWW Bureau Member. The Athletes' Commission was established in 2013 with the role of protecting the rights and interests of all United World Wrestling Olympic style athletes. The Athletes' Commission members reach out and communicate with active athletes as peers to collect feedback.

== Awards ==
Julfalakyan was awarded the "For Merit" 2nd degree medal in 2012 and the "For Service to Fatherland" 1st degree medal in 2014.
