= Doszhan Kartikov =

Kazakhstani freestyle wrestler

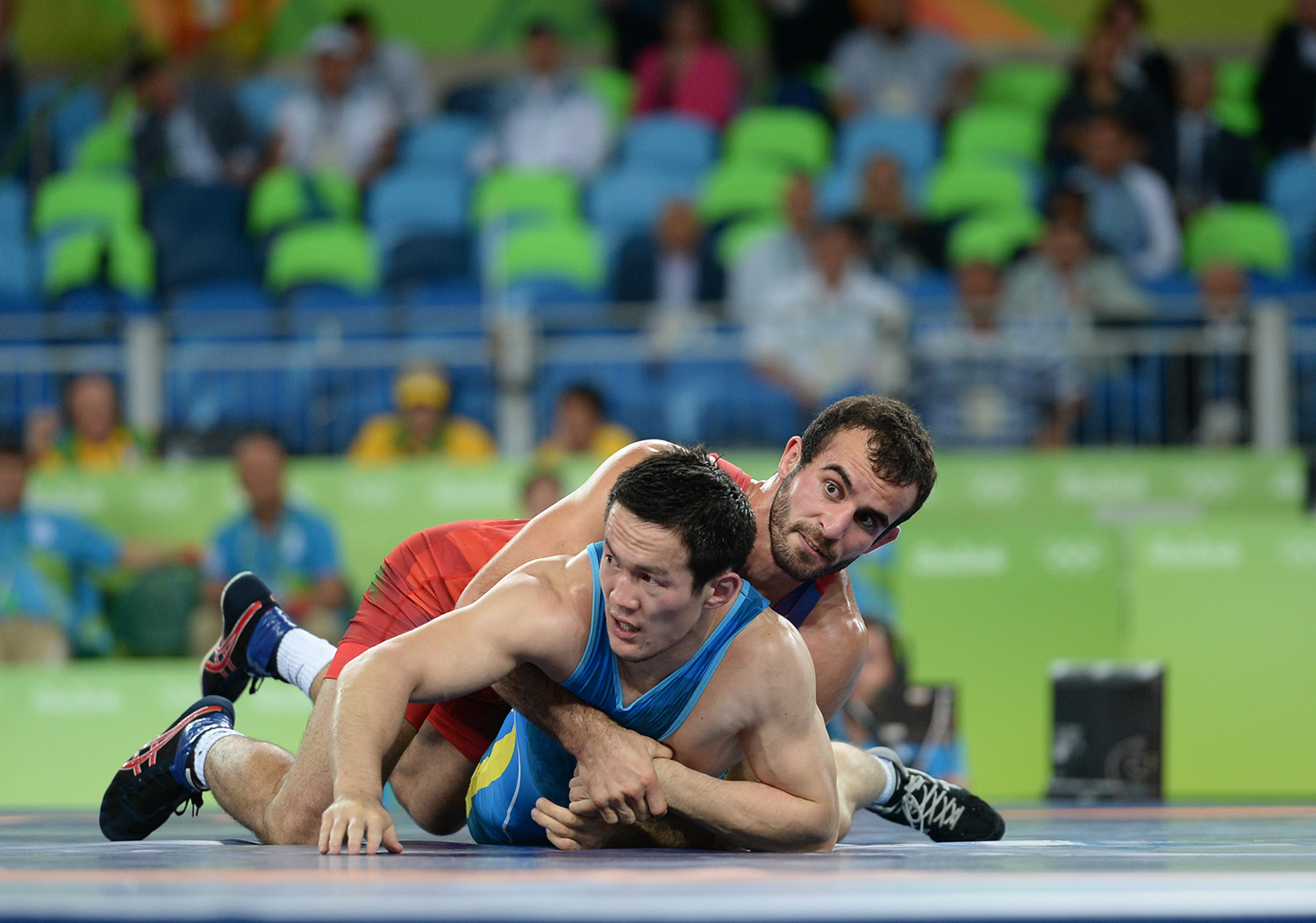
- Kartikov (down) against Elvin Mursaliyev during the 2016 Olympics

Personal information
- Nationality: Kazakh
- Born: 24 May 1989 (age 37) Ayagoz, Abai Region, Kazakh SSR, Soviet Union

Sport
- Sport: Sport wrestling
- Event: Freestyle
Medal record
World Championships
Bronze medal – third place	2015 Las Vegas	75 kg
Asian Games
Bronze medal – third place	2014 Incheon	75 kg
Asian Championships
Gold medal – first place	2016 Bangkok	75 kg
World Cup
Bronze medal – third place	2012 Baku	74 kg
World Junior Championships
Silver medal – second place	2009 Bucharest	74 kg

Doszhan Nurbatyrovich Kartikov (Kazakh: Досжан Нұрбатырұлы Картиков, romanized: Dosjan Nūrbatyrūly Kartikov; born 24 May 1989) is a Kazakh Greco-Roman wrestler.

Kartikov earned a bronze medal at the 2014 Asian Games in Men's Greco-Roman 75 kg. Kartikov earned a bronze medal at the 2015 World Wrestling Championships in Men's Greco-Roman 75 kg.

He has also won the Dave Schultz Memorial tournament.
