= Batboldyn Nomin =

Mongolian freestyle wrestler

Personal information
- Native name: Батболдын Номин
- Nationality: Mongolia
- Born: 4 February 1993 (age 33) Arkhust, Töv Province, Mongolia
- Height: 160 cm (5 ft 3 in)

Sport
- Country: Mongolia
- Sport: Wrestling
- Weight class: 61 kg
- Event: Freestyle

Achievements and titles
- World finals: (silver) (2015)
- Regional finals: (bronze) (2014)
Medal record
Men's freestyle wrestling
Representing Mongolia
World Championships
Silver medal – second place	2015 Las Vegas	61 kg
Asian Games
Bronze medal – third place	2014 Incheon	57 kg
Asian Championships
Bronze medal – third place	2015 Doha	61 kg
Bronze medal – third place	2013 New Delhi	57 kg
Yasar Dogu Tournament
Gold medal – first place	2014 Istanbul	57 kg
Dan Kolov & Nikola Petrov Tournament
Bronze medal – third place	2016 Sofia	65 kg
U20 Word Championships
Silver medal – second place	2013 Sofia	60 kg
Asian Cadets Championships
Silver medal – second place	2010 Huangshan	55 kg

Batboldyn Nomin (Mongolian: Батболдын Номин; born 4 February 1993) is a Mongolian freestyle wrestler who competes in the 61 kg division. He won a bronze medal at the 2014 Asian Games and silver medals at the 2015 world championships.

== Career ==
Nomin achieved his first major international results at the junior level by winning the silver medal in the 55 kg event at the 2010 Asian Junior Championships and the silver medal in the 60 kg event at the 2013 World Junior Wrestling Championships.

He won his first senior continental medal at the 2013 Asian Wrestling Championships, claiming the bronze medal in the 55 kg category. The following year, he won another bronze medal in the 57 kg event at the 2014 Asian Games.

Nomin achieved the greatest success of his career at the 2015 World Wrestling Championships. Competing in the men's freestyle 61 kg event in Las Vegas, he defeated Bajrang Punia, Reece Humphrey, and Beka Lomtadze to reach the final, where he was defeated by Haji Aliyev and won the silver medal. During the same season, he also won the bronze medal in the 61 kg category at the 2015 Asian Wrestling Championships.
