= Mark Madsen (fighter) =

Danish martial artist and wrestler

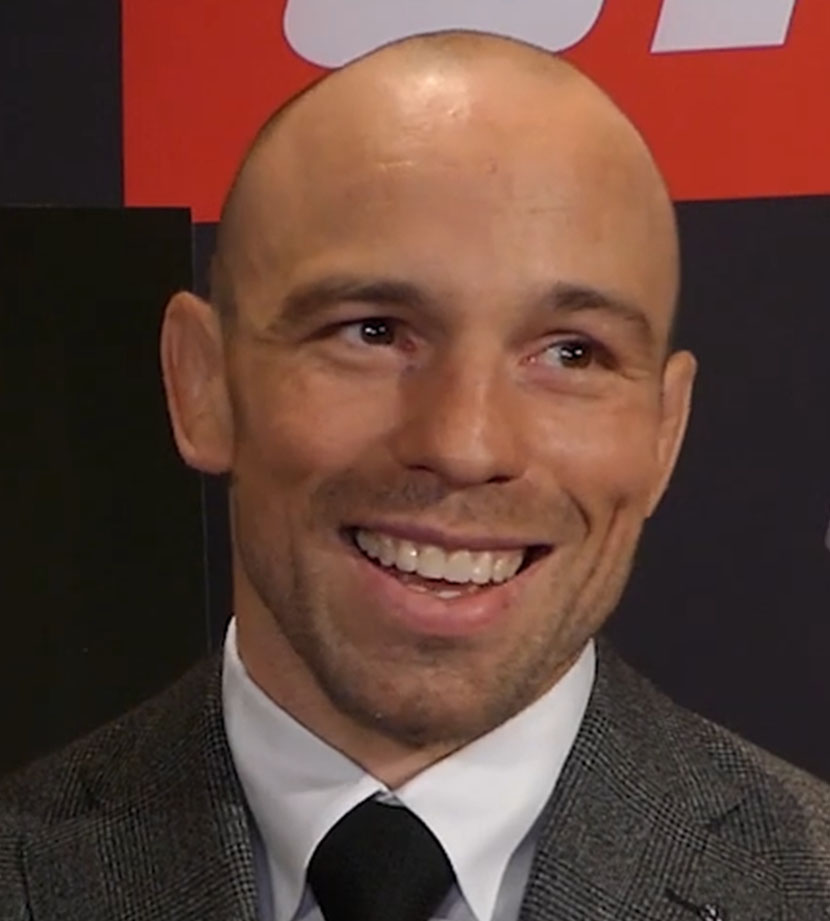
- Madsen at UFC Fight Night 160 in Copenhagen
- Born: Mark Overgaard Madsen; 23 September 1984 (age 42); Nykøbing Falster, Denmark
- Other names: The Olympian
- Height: 5 ft 8 in (173 cm)
- Weight: 155 lb (70 kg; 11 st 1 lb)
- Division: Welterweight (2013–2019); Lightweight (2019–2023)
- Style: Wrestling
- Team: Team Olympian; Xtreme Couture (2018–2021); Fight Ready (2021–present)
- Trainer: Martin Kampmann (head coach)
- Wrestling: Olympic Greco-Roman Wrestling
- Years active: 2013–2023 (MMA)

Mixed martial arts record
- Total: 14
- Wins: 12
- By knockout: 3
- By submission: 3
- By decision: 6
- Losses: 2
- By knockout: 1
- By submission: 1

Other information
- Notable club: BK Thor (wrestling)
- Mixed martial arts record from Sherdog

Mark Overgaard Madsen (born 23 September 1984) is a Danish politician, retired professional mixed martial artist and former Greco-Roman wrestler, who currently serves as president of Dominance FC, a mixed martial arts promotion. As a mixed martial artist, he competed in the lightweight division of the Ultimate Fighting Championship (UFC). In the 2025 Danish local elections he was elected to become a municipal councillor in Guldborgsund Municipality.

As a wrestler, Madsen won the silver medal in the 75 kg class at the 2016 Summer Olympics and was five-time medalist at the world championships, among other championships.

== Wrestling career ==
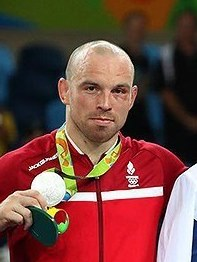
Madsen at the 2016 Olympics

Madsen started wrestling at six years old. At the 2008 Summer Olympics in Beijing, he lost to Russia's Varteres Samurgashev in the first preliminary round of men's Greco-Roman 74 kg, with a technical score of 1–7, and a classification score of 1–3.

At the 2012 Summer Olympics in London, England, Madsen was defeated by another Russian wrestler, Roman Vlasov, in the second round of the men's Greco-Roman 74 kg category. Because his opponent advanced further until the final round, Madsen qualified for the repechage bout, where he scored four points and defeated France's Christophe Guénot. In the bronze medal match, Madsen was unable to score enough points in the first two periods, and lost to Lithuania's Aleksandr Kazakevič, finishing in fifth place.

A few months after the games, Madsen signed a contract with European MMA.

At the 2016 Summer Olympics in Rio de Janeiro, Madsen won silver in men's Greco-Roman 75 kg, losing the final match against Roman Vlasov, who previously beat him in the 2012 Summer Olympics.

== Mixed martial arts career ==
=== Early career ===
Madsen competed in two professional bouts in 2013 and 2014 but because he was receiving salary from the Danish Wrestling Federation for his commitment, Madsen was subsequently essentially forbidden to compete in mixed martial arts. Due to his retirement from wrestling, he was allowed to start training and competing in mixed martial arts.

After amassing four straight professional victories in the regional circuit, Madsen signed with Cage Warriors. Madsen made his promotional debut against Alexandre Bordin at Cage Warriors Academy's inaugural event on 23 September 2018. The fight was largely contested on the ground, leading Madsen to a unanimous decision victory by dominant grappling.

After the bout with Bordin, Madsen has been training at Xtreme Couture in Las Vegas. Madsen headlined Cage Warriors Academy Denmark 2 against Mathew Bonner on 15 December 2018 and won the bout via unanimous decision.

Madsen made his Cage Warriors debut against Thibaud Larchet at Cage Warriors 103 on 9 March 2019. Madsen won the fight via unanimous decision.

Madsen faced Danish boxer Patrick Nielsen in an MMA bout at Olympian Fight Night 1 on 8 June 2019. Madsen won the fight in the first round via rear-naked choke.

=== Ultimate Fighting Championship ===
Madsen made his promotional debut against Danillo Belluardo on 28 September 2019 at UFC on ESPN+ 18. He won the fight via TKO in the first round.

After recovering from shoulder injury and staph infection, Madsen returned to face Austin Hubbard on 7 March 2020 at UFC 248. He used his superior wrestling to win the fight by unanimous decision despite suffering a broken jaw during the course of the bout.

Madsen faced Clay Guida on 21 August 2021 in the co-main event in UFC on ESPN: Cannonier vs. Gastelum. He won the fight via split decision.

Madsen was scheduled to face Vinc Pichel on 12 February 2022 at UFC 271. However, they were pushed back to 9 April 2022 at UFC 273 for unknown reasons. He won the fight via unanimous decision.

Madsen was scheduled to face Drakkar Klose on 29 October 2022, at UFC Fight Night 213. However, Klose pulled out in mid-October due to an anterior cruciate ligament injury. He was replaced by Grant Dawson. In turn, the bout was moved to UFC Fight Night 214 on 5 November 2022. At the weigh-ins, Dawson weighed in at 157.5 pounds, one and a half pounds over the lightweight non-title fight limit. The bout proceeded at catchweight and Grant was fined 30% of his individual purse, which went to Madsen. Madsen lost the fight via a rear-naked choke submission in the third round.

Madsen faced Jared Gordon on 11 November 2023, at UFC 295. He lost the bout at the end of the first round via TKO stoppage, getting dropped with an elbow and finished with ground and pound.

On 31 January 2024, Madsen announced his retirement from MMA competition.

== Dominance Fighting Championship ==
On 17 June 2024, Madsen announced that he would be launching a mixed martial arts promotion called Dominance Fighting Championship (DFC). The promotion held its inaugural event on 21 September at K.B. Hallen.

== Championships and accomplishments ==
=== Mixed martial arts ===
- Nordic MMA Awards - MMAviking.com
  - 2018 Knockout of the Year vs. Dez Parker
  - 2019 Breakthrough Fighter of the Year

=== Amateur wrestling ===
- Olympic Games
  - 2016 Rio de Janeiro - Greco-Roman, 75 kg, 2nd place (silver)
  - 2012 London - Greco-Roman, 74 kg, 5th place
- International Federation of Associated Wrestling Styles
  - World Wrestling Championships
    - 2005 Budapest - Greco-Roman, 74 kg 2nd place (silver)
    - 2006 Guangzhou - Greco-Roman, 74 kg, third place (bronze)
    - 2007 Baku - Greco-Roman, 74 kg, 2nd place (silver)
    - 2009 Herning - Greco-Roman, 74 kg, 2nd place (silver)
    - 2015 Las Vegas - Greco-Roman, 75kg, 2nd place (silver)
  - European Wrestling Championships
    - 2004 Murska Sobota - Greco-Roman, junior level, 74 kg, 1st place (gold)
    - 2014 Vantaa - Greco-Roman, 75 kg, 3rd place (bronze)
- Nordic Wrestling Association
  - 2005 Nordic Championships Greco-Roman, 74 kg, 1st place (gold)
  - 2006 Nordic Championships Greco-Roman, 74 kg, 1st place (gold)
  - 2008 Nordic Championships Greco-Roman, 74 kg, 1st place (gold)
  - 2010 Nordic Championships Greco-Roman, 74 kg, 1st place (gold)
  - 2015 Nordic Championships Greco-Roman, 80 kg, 1st place (gold)
  - 2016 Nordic Championships Greco-Roman, 75 kg, 1st place (gold)
  - 2017 Nordic Championships Greco-Roman, 80 kg, 2nd place (silver)
- Danish Wrestling Federation
  - 1999 Danish Championships Greco-Roman, 54 kg, 3rd place (bronze)
  - 2001 Danish Championships Greco-Roman, 69 kg, 1st place (gold)
  - 2002 Danish Championships Greco-Roman, 74 kg, 1st place (gold)
  - 2004 Danish Championships Greco-Roman, 74 kg, 1st place (gold)
  - 2005 Danish Championships Greco-Roman, 84 kg, 1st place (gold)
  - 2007 Danish Championships Greco-Roman, 84 kg, 1st place (gold)
  - 2008 Danish Championships Greco-Roman, 84 kg, 1st place (gold)
  - 2009 Danish Championships Greco-Roman, 84 kg, 1st place (gold)
  - 2010 Danish Championships Greco-Roman, 96 kg, 1st place (gold)
  - 2015 Danish Championships Greco-Roman, 80 kg, 1st place (gold)
  - 2016 Danish Championships Greco-Roman, 80 kg, 1st place (gold)
  - 2017 Danish Championships Greco-Roman, 80 kg, 1st place (gold)

== Mixed martial arts record ==
Professional record breakdown
14 matches	12 wins	2 losses
By knockout	3	1
By submission	3	1
By decision	6	0

Res.	Record	Opponent	Method	Event	Date	Round	Time	Location	Notes
Loss	12–2	Jared Gordon	TKO (elbow and punches)	UFC 295	11 November 2023	1	4:42	New York City, New York, United States	
Loss	12–1	Grant Dawson	Submission (rear-naked choke)	UFC Fight Night: Rodriguez vs. Lemos	5 November 2022	3	2:05	Las Vegas, Nevada, United States	Catchweight (157.5 lb) bout; Dawson missed weight.
Win	12–0	Vinc Pichel	Decision (unanimous)	UFC 273	9 April 2022	3	5:00	Jacksonville, Florida, United States	
Win	11–0	Clay Guida	Decision (split)	UFC on ESPN: Cannonier vs. Gastelum	21 August 2021	3	5:00	Las Vegas, Nevada, United States	
Win	10–0	Austin Hubbard	Decision (unanimous)	UFC 248	7 March 2020	3	5:00	Las Vegas, Nevada, United States	
Win	9–0	Danilo Belluardo	TKO (punches)	UFC Fight Night: Hermansson vs. Cannonier	28 September 2019	1	1:12	Copenhagen, Denmark	Lightweight debut.
Win	8–0	Patrick Nielsen	Submission (rear-naked choke)	Olympian Fight Night	9 June 2019	1	2:47	Copenhagen, Denmark	Catchweight (166 lb) bout.
Win	7–0	Thibaud Larchet	Decision (unanimous)	Cage Warriors 103	9 March 2019	3	5:00	Copenhagen, Denmark	
Win	6–0	Matthew Bonner	Decision (unanimous)	Cage Warriors Academy Denmark 2	15 December 2018	3	5:00	Frederikshavn, Denmark	
Win	5–0	Alexandre Bordin	Decision (unanimous)	Cage Warriors Academy Denmark 1	23 September 2018	3	5:00	Nykøbing Falster, Denmark	
Win	4–0	Dez Parker	KO (punch)	Danish MMA Night Vol. 1	9 June 2018	1	4:30	Brøndby, Denmark	
Win	3–0	Matthias Freyschuss	Technical Submission (guillotine choke)	MMA Galla 04	13 January 2018	1	0:26	Nykøbing Falster, Denmark	
Win	2–0	Chay Ingram	Submission (guillotine choke)	European MMA 9: "Mark" Your Time	23 May 2014	1	2:27	Copenhagen, Denmark	
Win	1–0	Philipp Henze	TKO (punches)	European MMA 6	26 September 2013	1	0:44	Copenhagen, Denmark	Welterweight debut.

== See also ==
- List of male mixed martial artists
