= Neven Žugaj =

Croatian Greco-Roman wrestler

Medal record

Men's Greco-Roman wrestling

Representing Croatia

World Championships
Silver medal – second place	2014 Tashkent	75 kg
Bronze medal – third place	2011 Istanbul	74 kg

European Championships
Bronze medal – third place	2005 Varna	74 kg

Mediterranean Games
Silver medal – second place	2013 Mersin	74 kg
Bronze medal – third place	2009 Pescara	74 kg

Neven Žugaj (born 19 April 1983 in Zagreb) is a Croatian Greco-Roman wrestler. He won a silver (2014) and bronze (2011) medal at the World Championships, a bronze at the 2005 European Championship and a silver (2013) and bronze (2009) medal at the Mediterranean Games. He also competed at the 2012 Olympics.

His twin brother Nenad Žugaj (younger by three minutes) also represents Croatia in wrestling.

In the 2016 European Wrestling Championships – Men's Greco-Roman 75 kg, he lost bronze medal match to Hungarian László Szabó.
