= 2015 World Wrestling Championships =

- Host city: Las Vegas, United States
- Dates: 7–12 September 2015
- Stadium: Orleans Arena

Champions
- Freestyle: Iran
- Greco-Roman: Azerbaijan
- Women: Japan

The 2015 UWW World Wrestling Championships were the 12th edition of World Wrestling Championships of combined events and was held from September 7 to 12 at Orleans Arena in Paradise, Nevada, in the Las Vegas Valley, United States.

== Medal table ==
Rank	Nation	Gold	Silver	Bronze	Total
1	Russia	4	1	6	11
2	United States	4	0	4	8
3	Turkey	3	1	2	6
4	Japan	3	1	1	5
5	Azerbaijan	2	4	2	8
6	Ukraine	2	1	6	9
7	Mongolia	1	3	1	5
8	Cuba	1	1	0	2
9	Georgia	1	0	4	5
10	Armenia	1	0	1	2
10	Germany	1	0	1	2
12	Italy	1	0	0	1
13	Iran	0	3	4	7
14	China	0	2	0	2
14	Uzbekistan	0	2	0	2
16	Belarus	0	1	1	2
16	Sweden	0	1	1	2
18	Denmark	0	1	0	1
18	Finland	0	1	0	1
18	South Korea	0	1	0	1
21	Bulgaria	0	0	4	4
22	Kazakhstan	0	0	2	2
22	North Korea	0	0	2	2
24	Canada	0	0	1	1
24	Estonia	0	0	1	1
24	India	0	0	1	1
24	Netherlands	0	0	1	1
24	Nigeria	0	0	1	1
24	Serbia	0	0	1	1
Totals (29 entries)		24	24	48	96

== Team ranking ==
Rank	Men's freestyle		Men's Greco-Roman		Women's freestyle	
Rank	Team	Points	Team	Points	Team	Points
1	Iran	49	Azerbaijan	39	Japan	51
2	Georgia	46	Russia	38	China	42
3	Russia	44	Ukraine	35	United States	31
4	Mongolia	41	Iran	31	Ukraine	30
5	Azerbaijan	40	Kazakhstan	23	Russia	29
6	Turkey	34	Belarus	21	Azerbaijan	29
7	United States	29	Turkey	20	Mongolia	27
8	Bulgaria	23	Germany	20	Bulgaria	24
9	Ukraine	20	United States	20	Sweden	21
10	India	14	Cuba	19	Belarus	19

- Russia originally won both men's team titles in Las Vegas but eventually lost them to Iran and Azerbaijan ten years later after the disqualification of Bilyal Makhov and Abdusalam Gadisov.

== Medal summary ==
=== Men's freestyle ===
Event	Gold	Silver	Bronze
57 kg	Vladimer Khinchegashvili; Georgia	Hassan Rahimi; Iran	Erdenebatyn Bekhbayar; Mongolia
57 kg	Vladimer Khinchegashvili; Georgia	Hassan Rahimi; Iran	Viktor Lebedev; Russia
61 kg	Haji Aliyev; Azerbaijan	Batboldyn Nomin; Mongolia	Vladimir Dubov; Bulgaria
61 kg	Haji Aliyev; Azerbaijan	Batboldyn Nomin; Mongolia	Vasyl Shuptar; Ukraine
65 kg	Frank Chamizo; Italy	Ikhtiyor Navruzov; Uzbekistan	Soslan Ramonov; Russia
65 kg	Frank Chamizo; Italy	Ikhtiyor Navruzov; Uzbekistan	Ahmad Mohammadi; Iran
70 kg	Magomedrasul Gazimagomedov; Russia	Hassan Yazdani; Iran	Yakup Gör; Turkey
70 kg	Magomedrasul Gazimagomedov; Russia	Hassan Yazdani; Iran	James Green; United States
74 kg	Jordan Burroughs; United States	Pürevjavyn Önörbat; Mongolia	Narsingh Yadav; India
74 kg	Jordan Burroughs; United States	Pürevjavyn Önörbat; Mongolia	Aniuar Geduev; Russia
86 kg	Abdulrashid Sadulaev; Russia	Selim Yaşar; Turkey	Sandro Aminashvili; Georgia
86 kg	Abdulrashid Sadulaev; Russia	Selim Yaşar; Turkey	Alireza Karimi; Iran
97 kg	Kyle Snyder; United States	Khetag Gazyumov; Azerbaijan	Elizbar Odikadze; Georgia
97 kg	Kyle Snyder; United States	Khetag Gazyumov; Azerbaijan	Pavlo Oliynyk; Ukraine
125 kg	Taha Akgül; Turkey	Jamaladdin Magomedov; Azerbaijan	Geno Petriashvili; Georgia
125 kg	Taha Akgül; Turkey	Jamaladdin Magomedov; Azerbaijan	Levan Berianidze; Armenia

=== Men's Greco-Roman ===
Event	Gold	Silver	Bronze
59 kg	Ismael Borrero; Cuba	Rovshan Bayramov; Azerbaijan	Yun Won-chol; North Korea
59 kg	Ismael Borrero; Cuba	Rovshan Bayramov; Azerbaijan	Almat Kebispayev; Kazakhstan
66 kg	Frank Stäbler; Germany	Ryu Han-su; South Korea	Davor Štefanek; Serbia
66 kg	Frank Stäbler; Germany	Ryu Han-su; South Korea	Artem Surkov; Russia
71 kg	Rasul Chunayev; Azerbaijan	Armen Vardanyan; Ukraine	Adam Kurak; Russia
71 kg	Rasul Chunayev; Azerbaijan	Armen Vardanyan; Ukraine	Zakarias Tallroth; Sweden
75 kg	Roman Vlasov; Russia	Mark Madsen; Denmark	Andy Bisek; United States
75 kg	Roman Vlasov; Russia	Mark Madsen; Denmark	Doszhan Kartikov; Kazakhstan
80 kg	Selçuk Çebi; Turkey	Viktar Sasunouski; Belarus	Yousef Ghaderian; Iran
80 kg	Selçuk Çebi; Turkey	Viktar Sasunouski; Belarus	Lasha Gobadze; Georgia
85 kg	Zhan Beleniuk; Ukraine	Rustam Assakalov; Uzbekistan	Habibollah Akhlaghi; Iran
85 kg	Zhan Beleniuk; Ukraine	Rustam Assakalov; Uzbekistan	Saman Tahmasebi; Azerbaijan
98 kg	Artur Aleksanyan; Armenia	Ghasem Rezaei; Iran	Islam Magomedov; Russia
98 kg	Artur Aleksanyan; Armenia	Ghasem Rezaei; Iran	Dimitriy Timchenko; Ukraine
130 kg	Rıza Kayaalp; Turkey	Mijaín López; Cuba	Oleksandr Chernetskyi; Ukraine
130 kg	Rıza Kayaalp; Turkey	Mijaín López; Cuba	Robby Smith; United States

=== Women's freestyle ===
Event	Gold	Silver	Bronze
48 kg	Eri Tosaka; Japan	Mariya Stadnik; Azerbaijan	Jessica Blaszka; Netherlands
48 kg	Eri Tosaka; Japan	Mariya Stadnik; Azerbaijan	Geneviève Morrison; Canada
53 kg	Saori Yoshida; Japan	Sofia Mattsson; Sweden	Jong Myong-suk; North Korea
53 kg	Saori Yoshida; Japan	Sofia Mattsson; Sweden	Odunayo Adekuoroye; Nigeria
55 kg	Helen Maroulis; United States	Irina Ologonova; Russia	Evelina Nikolova; Bulgaria
55 kg	Helen Maroulis; United States	Irina Ologonova; Russia	Tetyana Kit; Ukraine
58 kg	Kaori Icho; Japan	Petra Olli; Finland	Elif Jale Yeşilırmak; Turkey
58 kg	Kaori Icho; Japan	Petra Olli; Finland	Yuliya Ratkevich; Azerbaijan
60 kg	Oksana Herhel; Ukraine	Sükheegiin Tserenchimed; Mongolia	Dzhanan Manolova; Bulgaria
60 kg	Oksana Herhel; Ukraine	Sükheegiin Tserenchimed; Mongolia	Leigh Jaynes; United States
63 kg	Soronzonboldyn Battsetseg; Mongolia	Risako Kawai; Japan	Yuliya Tkach; Ukraine
63 kg	Soronzonboldyn Battsetseg; Mongolia	Risako Kawai; Japan	Taybe Yusein; Bulgaria
69 kg	Natalia Vorobieva; Russia	Zhou Feng; China	Sara Dosho; Japan
69 kg	Natalia Vorobieva; Russia	Zhou Feng; China	Aline Focken; Germany
75 kg	Adeline Gray; United States	Zhou Qian; China	Vasilisa Marzaliuk; Belarus
75 kg	Adeline Gray; United States	Zhou Qian; China	Epp Mäe; Estonia

== Participating nations ==
821 competitors from 95 nations participated.

- Albania (3)
- Algeria (2)
- American Samoa (5)
- Argentina (2)
- Armenia (15)
- Australia (3)
- Austria (12)
- Azerbaijan (23)
- Belarus (23)
- Bolivia (1)
- Brazil (17)
- Bulgaria (22)
- Cameroon (2)
- Canada (18)
- Chile (4)
- China (24)
- Chinese Taipei (2)
- Colombia (10)
- Costa Rica (1)
- Croatia (6)
- Cuba (11)
- Czech Republic (10)
- Denmark (2)
- Ecuador (3)
- Egypt (9)
- El Salvador (1)
- Estonia (6)
- Finland (8)
- France (7)
- Georgia (16)
- Germany (20)
- Great Britain (1)
- Greece (11)
- Guam (1)
- Guatemala (1)
- Guinea-Bissau (1)
- Haiti (1)
- Honduras (3)
- Hungary (21)
- India (23)
- Iran (16)
- Iraq (1)
- Ireland (1)
- Israel (7)
- Italy (12)
- Japan (24)
- Kazakhstan (24)
- Kosovo (2)
- Kyrgyzstan (16)
- Latvia (4)
- Lithuania (7)
- Macedonia (5)
- Marshall Islands (3)
- Mexico (13)
- Moldova (16)
- Monaco (2)
- Mongolia (16)
- Morocco (5)
- Namibia (3)
- Nauru (1)
- Netherlands (1)
- New Zealand (1)
- Nigeria (1)
- North Korea (7)
- Norway (6)
- Pakistan (1)
- Palau (3)
- Palestine (1)
- Panama (1)
- Peru (4)
- Poland (16)
- Portugal (3)
- Puerto Rico (10)
- Romania (12)
- Russia (23)
- Senegal (2)
- Serbia (7)
- Slovakia (8)
- Slovenia (2)
- South Africa (5)
- South Korea (22)
- Spain (9)
- Sri Lanka (4)
- Sweden (9)
- Switzerland (7)
- Tajikistan (9)
- Trinidad and Tobago (1)
- Tunisia (1)
- Turkey (24)
- Turkmenistan (6)
- Ukraine (24)
- United States (24)
- Uzbekistan (15)
- Venezuela (18)
- Vietnam (5)
