= Andy Bisek =

American Greco-Roman wrestler (born 1986)

Andrew Bisek
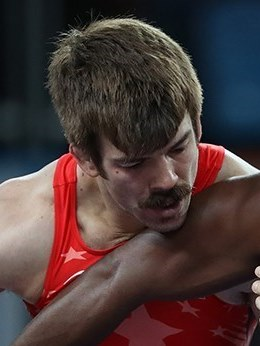
- Bisek in 2016

Personal information
- Born: August 18, 1986 (age 39) Waconia, Minnesota, U.S.
- Height: 5 ft 9 in (175 cm)
- Weight: 75 kg (165 lb)

Sport
- Country: United States
- Sport: Wrestling
- Event: Greco-Roman
- College team: Northern Michigan
- Club: Minnesota Storm
- Team: USA
- Coached by: Momir Petković, Ivan Ivanov, Jeff Piatz
Medal record
Men's Greco-Roman wrestling
Representing United States
World Championships
| Bronze medal – third place | 2014 Tashkent | 75 kg |
| Bronze medal – third place | 2015 Las Vegas | 75 kg |
Pan American Games
| Gold medal – first place | 2015 Toronto | 75 kg |

Andy Bisek (born August 18, 1986) is an American Greco-Roman wrestler. Bisek is of Polish descent. He was a 2016 Olympian and two-time World bronze medalist in Greco-Roman wrestling, representing Team USA.

== High school and college ==
Bisek attended Chaska High School in Chaska, Minnesota. As a high school wrestler, he placed third in the state of Minnesota. He originally planned to attend Minnesota State University-Mankato, but after a meeting with Chas Betts, he decided to attend Northern Michigan University to focus on Greco-Roman wrestling, from which he graduated.

== International ==
Bisek competed at the 2011 World Wrestling Championships and the 2013 World Wrestling Championships, but did not place at either event. At the Golden Grand Prix Ivan Poddubny 2013 in the quarterfinals was eliminated by Roman Vlasov of Russia.

At the 2014 World Wrestling Championships, Bisek was a bronze medalist at Greco-Roman 75 kg weight division. He would knock off defending Olympic champion from 2012, Roman Vlasov of Russia, on the way to his first World level bronze medal. It would also be the first World Greco-Roman medal for the United States since 2009. Bisek also competed at the 2014 FILA Wrestling World Cup.

In 2015, Bisek again wrestled at the World Wrestling Championships, where he earned a second Bronze medal. Bisek earned his spot on the United States Greco-Roman wrestling team at 75 kg for the 2016 Summer Olympics, where he reached the quarter finals, finishing 1-1 at the event.
