= Robert Rosengren =

Swedish wrestler

Personal information
- Full name: Robert Patrik Rosengren
- Nationality: Sweden
- Born: October 17, 1986 (age 39) Husie, Sweden
- Height: 1.77 m (5 ft 9 1/2 in)
- Weight: 74 kg (163 lb)

Sport
- Sport: Wrestling
- Event: Greco-Roman
- Club: IK Sparta
- Coached by: Macki Tatidis

Robert Patrik Rosengren (born October 17, 1986 in Husie) is a Swedish wrestler, who competed for the men's Greco-Roman 74 kg at the 2012 Summer Olympics in London, after having qualified at the 2011 World Championships in Istanbul, Turkey for his fifth-place finish. Rosengren made a surprise tactic in the round of sixteen round, as he upset and beat out the double world champion Selçuk Çebi of Turkey, with a technical score. He was subsequently eliminated in the quarterfinal round, after losing out to Lithuania's Aleksandr Kazakevič, who eventually won the bronze medal in this event.

Rosengren is an information technology graduate, and works as an engineer. He is also currently a member of IK Sparta, being coached and trained by Macki Tatidis.
