= Askhat Dilmukhamedov =

Kazakh Greco-Roman wrestler

Personal information
- Full name: Askhat Rakhatuly; Dilmukhamedov
- Nationality: Kazakhstani
- Born: 26 July 1986 (age 39) Alma-Ata, Kazakh SSR, Soviet Union
- Height: 1.80 m (5 ft 11 in)
- Weight: 74 kg (163 lb)

Sport
- Sport: Wrestling
- Event: Greco-Roman
- Coached by: Yerzhan Akhmetov
Medal record
Men's Greco-Roman wrestling
Representing Kazakhstan
Asian Championships
Gold medal – first place	2018 Bishkek	82 kg
Bronze medal – third place	2016 Bangkok	80 kg
Bronze medal – third place	2011 Tashkent	74 kg
Asian Indoor Games
Bronze medal – third place	2017 Ashgabat	80 kg
World University Championships
Bronze medal – third place	2006 Ulaanbaatar	66 kg

Askhat Rakhatuly Dilmukhamedov (Kazakh: Асқат Рахатұлы Ділмұхамедов, Asqat Rahatūly Dılmūhamedov; born July 26, 1986) is an amateur Kazakh Greco-Roman wrestler, who competes in the men's middleweight category. He won a bronze medal in his division at the 2011 Asian Wrestling Championships in Tashkent, Uzbekistan.

Dilmukhametov represented Kazakhstan at the 2012 Summer Olympics, where he competed for the men's 74 kg Greco-Roman. He received a bye into the second preliminary round, before losing out to Belarusian wrestler Aliaksandr Kikiniou, who was able to score three points in two straight periods, leaving Dilmukhametov without a single point.

In 2021, he won one of the bronze medals in the 77 kg event at the Matteo Pellicone Ranking Series 2021 held in Rome, Italy.
