= Roman Vlasov =

Russian Greco-Roman wrestler

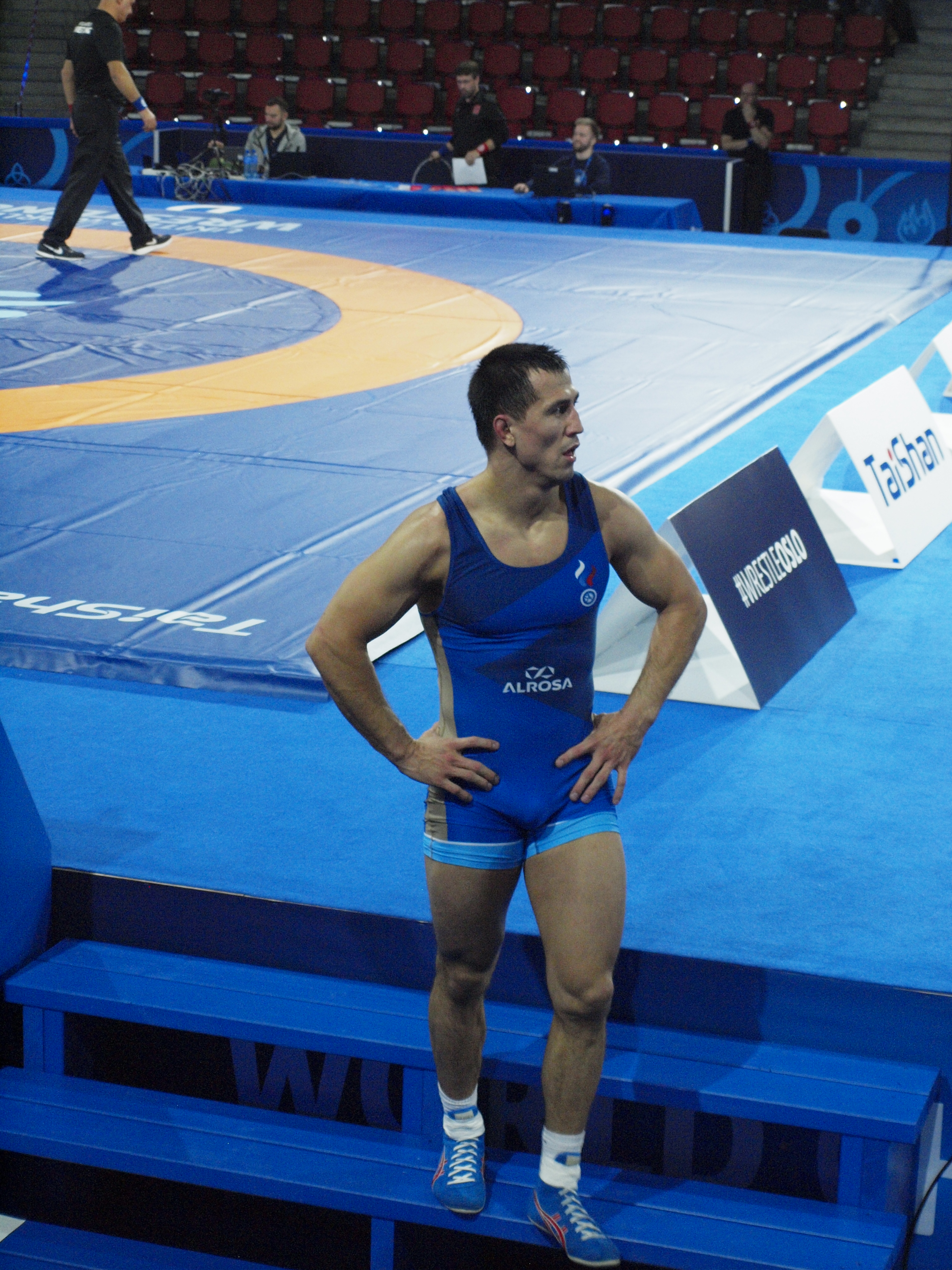
- Vlasov at the 2021 World Wrestling Championships

Personal information
- Full name: Roman Andreyevich Vlasov
- Born: 6 October 1990 (age 35) Novosibirsk, Russian SFSR, Soviet Union
- Height: 1.75 m (5 ft 9 in)
- Weight: 75 kg (165 lb)

Sport
- Country: Russia
- Sport: Wrestling
- Event: Greco-Roman
- Club: Alexander Karelin Novosibirsk
- Coached by: Viktor Kuznetsov
Medal record
Men's Greco-Roman wrestling
Representing Russia
Olympic Games
Gold medal – first place	2012 London	74 kg
Gold medal – first place	2016 Rio de Janeiro	75 kg
World Championships
Gold medal – first place	2011 Istanbul	74 kg
Gold medal – first place	2015 Las Vegas	75 kg
Gold medal – first place	2021 Oslo	77 kg
Silver medal – second place	2013 Budapest	74 kg
Representing Russia
Individual World Cup
Gold medal – first place	2020 Belgrade	77 kg
European Championships
Gold medal – first place	2012 Belgrade	74 kg
Gold medal – first place	2013 Tbilisi	74 kg
Gold medal – first place	2018 Kaspiysk	77 kg
Gold medal – first place	2019 Bucharest	77 kg
Bronze medal – third place	2011 Dortmund	74 kg
Ivan Poddubny
Gold medal – first place	2018 Krasnodar	77 kg
World Cup
Gold medal – first place	2017 Abadan	75 kg
Silver medal – second place	2014 Tehran	75 kg
Silver medal – second place	2015 Tehran	75 kg
Bronze medal – third place	2011 Minsk	74 kg
Bronze medal – third place	2013 Tehran	74 kg
Summer Universiade
Gold medal – first place	2013 Kazan	74 kg

Roman Andreyevich Vlasov (Russian: Роман Андреевич Власов; born 6 October 1990) is a Russian Greco-Roman wrestler. He is a two-time Olympic Champion (2012, 2016), a three-time World Champion (2011, 2015, 2021), and a four-time European Champion (2012, 2013, 2018, 2019). He also won the gold medal at the 2013 Summer Universiade. Furthermore, he was runner-up at the 2013 World Championships and the 2014 and 2015 World Cup. Vlasov trains under Viktor Kuznetsov, the same coach who raised Aleksandr Karelin.

In 2020, he won the gold medal in the 77 kg event at the 2020 Individual Wrestling World Cup held in Belgrade, Serbia.
