= Wrestling at the 2012 Summer Olympics – Qualification =

This article details the Wrestling at the 2012 Summer Olympics qualifying phase.

The Wrestling competition at the 2012 Games included 344 athletes. Each competing nation was allowed to enter a maximum of 18 competitors (1 per event).

3 places were reserved for Great Britain as host nation, but Great Britain decided to use only one of them and a further 3 invitational places were decided by the Tripartite Commission. The remaining 338 places were allocated through the qualification process, in which athletes won quota places for their respective nation.

== Timeline ==
Event	Date	Venue
2011 World Championships	September 12–18, 2011	Istanbul, Turkey
African & Oceania Qualification Tournament	March 16–18, 2012	Marrakesh, Morocco
Pan American Qualification Tournament	March 23–25, 2012	Kissimmee, United States
Asian Qualification Tournament	March 30 – April 1, 2012	Astana, Kazakhstan
European Qualification Tournament	April 20–22, 2012	Sofia, Bulgaria
1st World Qualification Tournament	April 27–29, 2012	Taiyuan, China
2nd World Qualification Tournament	May 4–6, 2012	Helsinki, Finland

== Qualification summary ==
NOC	Men's freestyle							Men's Greco-Roman							Women's freestyle				Total
NOC	55	60	66	74	84	96	120	55	60	66	74	84	96	120	48	55	63	72	Total
Algeria					X				X	X									3
American Samoa						X													1
Argentina															X				1
Armenia	X		X		X					X	X		X	X					7
Australia		X																	1
Austria												X							1
Azerbaijan		X	X	X	X	X	X	X	X		X	X	X		X	X			13
Belarus			X		X	X	X	X			X	X	X	X	X			X	11
Brazil																X			1
Bulgaria	X	X	X	X				X	X			X	X					X	9
Cameroon																		X	1
Canada	X		X	X		X	X								X	X	X	X	9
Central African Republic																	X		1
Chile														X					1
China				X			X	X	X					X	X		X	X	8
Colombia															X	X		X	3
Croatia											X	X							2
Cuba		X	X		X	X		X	X	X	X	X	X	X			X		12
Czech Republic													X						1
Denmark								X			X								2
Ecuador										X						X			2
Egypt	X	X	X			X	X	X	X	X	X	X	X	X		X			13
Estonia													X	X					2
Federated States of Micronesia												X							1
Finland									X			X							2
France		X							X	X	X	X						X	6
Georgia	X	X	X	X	X	X	X		X	X	X	X	X	X					13
Germany		X					X			X					X				4
Great Britain																X			1
Greece				X												X			2
Guam																	X		1
Guinea-Bissau				X													X		2
Honduras	X																		1
Hungary				X			X	X		X	X			X			X		7
India	X	X	X	X												X			5
Iran	X	X	X	X	X	X	X	X	X	X		X	X	X					13
Iraq														X					1
Italy													X						1
Ivory Coast															X				1
Japan	X	X	X	X		X		X	X	X			X		X	X	X	X	13
Kazakhstan	X	X	X	X	X	X	X		X	X	X	X		X	X		X	X	15
Kyrgyzstan						X		X			X						X		4
Latvia					X												X		2
Lithuania										X	X								2
Madagascar																		X	1
Mexico		X					X												2
Moldova						X												X	2
Mongolia	X			X	X		X								X	X	X	X	8
Morocco								X					X						2
Namibia	X																		1
Nigeria					X	X											X	X	4
North Korea	X	X						X								X	X		5
Norway									X										1
Poland												X		X	X		X		4
Puerto Rico		X		X	X														3
Romania							X						X						2
Russia	X	X	X	X	X	X	X	X	X		X	X	X	X		X	X	X	16
Senegal							X								X				2
Serbia										X									1
South Korea	X	X						X	X	X	X	X			X	X			9
Spain																		X	1
Sweden											X		X	X		X	X	X	6
Switzerland										X									1
Tajikistan	X		X		X	X													4
Tunisia			X	X							X	X	X	X	X	X			8
Turkey	X		X		X	X	X	X	X	X	X	X	X	X			X		13
Ukraine		X	X		X	X	X	X	X			X		X	X	X	X	X	13
United States	X	X	X	X	X	X	X	X	X	X	X	X		X	X	X	X	X	17
Uzbekistan	X		X	X	X	X	X	X						X					8
Venezuela				X	X				X	X			X		X	X			7
Vietnam															X				1
Total: 71 NOCs	19	19	19	19	19	19	19	19	19	19	19	20	19	20	19	19	20	18	344

== Men's freestyle events ==
=== 55 kg ===
Competition	Places	Qualified wrestlers
2011 World Championships	6	Viktor Lebedev (RUS); Radoslav Velikov (BUL); Daulet Niyazbekov (KAZ); Hassan Rahimi (IRI); Mihran Jaburyan (ARM); Nick Simmons (USA)
African & Oceania Qualification Tournament	2	Ibrahim Farag (EGY); Sem Shilimela (NAM)
Pan American Qualification Tournament	2	David Tremblay (CAN); Brandon Escobar (HON)
Asian Qualification Tournament	2	Amit Kumar Dahiya (IND); Shinichi Yumoto (JPN)
European Qualification Tournament	2	Vladimer Khinchegashvili (GEO); Ahmet Peker (TUR)
1st World Qualification Tournament	3	Yang Kyong-il (PRK); Dilshod Mansurov (UZB); Kim Jin-cheol (KOR)
2nd World Qualification Tournament	2	Bayaraagiin Naranbaatar (MGL); Nikolay Noev (TJK)
Invitational / Host Country	0	—
Total	19	

=== 60 kg ===
Competition	Places	Qualified wrestlers
2011 World Championships	6	Besik Kudukhov (RUS); Franklin Gómez (PUR); Kenichi Yumoto (JPN); Dauren Zhumagaziyev (KAZ); Didier Païs (FRA); Malkhaz Zarkua (GEO)
African & Oceania Qualification Tournament	2	Hassan Madani (EGY); Farzad Tarash (AUS)
Pan American Qualification Tournament	2	Yowlys Bonne (CUB); Guillermo Torres (MEX)
Asian Qualification Tournament	2	Masoud Esmaeilpour (IRI); Yogeshwar Dutt (IND)
European Qualification Tournament	2	Toghrul Asgarov (AZE); Anatolie Guidea (BUL)
1st World Qualification Tournament	3	Ri Jong-myong (PRK); Lee Seung-chul (KOR); Shawn Bunch (USA)
2nd World Qualification Tournament	2	Vasyl Fedoryshyn (UKR); Tim Schleicher (GER)
Invitational / Host Country	0	—
Total	19	

=== 66 kg ===
Competition	Places	Qualified wrestlers
2011 World Championships	6	Mehdi Taghavi (IRI); Tatsuhiro Yonemitsu (JPN); Jabrayil Hasanov (AZE); Liván López (CUB); Leonid Bazan (BUL); Adam Batirov (RUS)
African & Oceania Qualification Tournament	2	Abdou Omar (EGY); Haithem Ben Alayech (TUN)
Pan American Qualification Tournament	2	Haislan Garcia (CAN); Brent Metcalf (USA)
Asian Qualification Tournament	2	Ikhtiyor Navruzov (UZB); Akzhurek Tanatarov (KAZ)
European Qualification Tournament	2	Ali Shabanau (BLR); David Safaryan (ARM)
1st World Qualification Tournament	3	Sushil Kumar (IND); Otar Tushishvili (GEO); Andriy Kviatkovskyi (UKR)
2nd World Qualification Tournament	2	Zalimkhan Yusupov (TJK); Ramazan Şahin (TUR)
Invitational / Host Country	0	—
Total	19	

=== 74 kg ===
Competition	Places	Qualified wrestlers
2011 World Championships	6	Jordan Burroughs (USA); Sadegh Goudarzi (IRI); Ashraf Aliyev (AZE); Davit Khutsishvili (GEO); Ricardo Roberty (VEN); Abdulkhakim Shapiyev (KAZ)
African & Oceania Qualification Tournament	2	Augusto Midana (GBS); Bilel Ouechtati (TUN)
Pan American Qualification Tournament	2	Matt Gentry (CAN); Francisco Soler (PUR)
Asian Qualification Tournament	2	Rashid Kurbanov (UZB); Sosuke Takatani (JPN)
European Qualification Tournament	2	Adam Saitiev (RUS); Kiril Terziev (BUL)
1st World Qualification Tournament	3	Pürevjavyn Önörbat (MGL); Gábor Hatos (HUN); Zhang Chongyao (CHN)
2nd World Qualification Tournament	2	Narsingh Yadav (IND); Olegk Motsalin (GRE)
Invitational / Host Country	0	—
Total	19	

=== 84 kg ===
Competition	Places	Qualified wrestlers
2011 World Championships	6	Sharif Sharifov (AZE); Ibragim Aldatov (UKR); Dato Marsagishvili (GEO); Albert Saritov (RUS); Armands Zvirbulis (LAT); Cael Sanderson (USA)
African & Oceania Qualification Tournament	2	Andrew Dick (NGR); Mohamed Riad Louafi (ALG) (Note: Miligy Ahmed from Egypt originally earned the quota, but tested positive for a banned substance.)
Pan American Qualification Tournament	2	Humberto Arencibia (CUB); Jaime Espinal (PUR)
Asian Qualification Tournament	2	Ehsan Lashgari (IRI); Zaurbek Sokhiev (UZB)
European Qualification Tournament	2	Gadzhimurad Nurmagomedov (ARM); İbrahim Bölükbaşı (TUR)
1st World Qualification Tournament	3	José Daniel Díaz (VEN); Soslan Gattsiev (BLR); Yermek Baiduashov (KAZ)
2nd World Qualification Tournament	2	Yusup Abdusalomov (TJK); Orgodolyn Üitümen (MGL)
Invitational / Host Country	0	—
Total	19	

=== 96 kg ===
Competition	Places	Qualified wrestlers
2011 World Championships	6	Reza Yazdani (IRI); Serhat Balcı (TUR); Ruslan Sheikhau (BLR); Jake Varner (USA); Sinivie Boltic (NGR); Taimuraz Tigiyev (KAZ)
African & Oceania Qualification Tournament	2	Mostafa Farhat (EGY); C. J. Floor (ASA)
Pan American Qualification Tournament	2	Javier Cortina (CUB); Khetag Pliev (CAN)
Asian Qualification Tournament	2	Kurban Kurbanov (UZB); Rustam Iskandari (TJK)
European Qualification Tournament	2	Abdusalam Gadisov (RUS); Giorgi Gogshelidze (GEO)
1st World Qualification Tournament	3	Khetag Gazyumov (AZE); Magomed Musaev (KGZ); Valeriy Andriytsev (UKR)
2nd World Qualification Tournament	2	Nicolae Ceban (MDA); Takao Isokawa (JPN)
Invitational / Host Country	0	—
Total	19	

=== 120 kg ===
Competition	Places	Qualified wrestlers
2011 World Championships	6	Aleksey Shemarov (BLR); Bilyal Makhov (RUS); Jamaladdin Magomedov (AZE); Davit Modzmanashvili (GEO); Jargalsaikhany Chuluunbat (MGL); Tervel Dlagnev (USA)
African & Oceania Qualification Tournament	2	El-Desoky Ismail (EGY); Malal Ndiaye (SEN)
Pan American Qualification Tournament	2	Arjan Bhullar (CAN); Jesse Ruíz (MEX)
Asian Qualification Tournament	2	Artur Taymazov (UZB); Marid Mutalimov (KAZ)
European Qualification Tournament	2	Dániel Ligeti (HUN); Taha Akgül (TUR)
1st World Qualification Tournament	3	Parviz Hadi (IRI); Nick Matuhin (GER); Liang Lei (CHN) (Note: A late injury prevented Liang Lei to participate at the games, the quota remained unused.)
2nd World Qualification Tournament	2	Oleksandr Khotsianivskyi (UKR); Rareș Chintoan (ROU)
Invitational / Host Country	0	—
Total	19	

== Men's Greco-Roman events ==
=== 55 kg ===
Competition	Places	Qualified wrestlers
2011 World Championships	6	Rovshan Bayramov (AZE); Elbek Tazhyieu (BLR); Li Shujin (CHN); Bekkhan Mankiev (RUS); Péter Módos (HUN); Yun Won-chol (PRK)
African & Oceania Qualification Tournament	2	Mohamed Abouhalima (EGY); Fouad Fajari (MAR)
Pan American Qualification Tournament	2	Javier Duménigo (CUB); Spenser Mango (USA)
Asian Qualification Tournament	2	Kohei Hasegawa (JPN); Hamid Sourian (IRI)
European Qualification Tournament	2	Håkan Nyblom (DEN); Aleksandar Kostadinov (BUL)
1st World Qualification Tournament	3	Choi Gyu-jin (KOR); Ayhan Karakuş (TUR); Elmurat Tasmuradov (UZB)
2nd World Qualification Tournament	2	Vugar Rahimov (UKR); Arsen Eraliev (KGZ)
Invitational / Host Country	0	—
Total	19	

=== 60 kg ===
Competition	Places	Qualified wrestlers
2011 World Championships	6	Omid Norouzi (IRI); Almat Kebispayev (KAZ); Zaur Kuramagomedov (RUS); Ivo Angelov (BUL); Jung Ji-hyun (KOR); Luis Liendo (VEN)
African & Oceania Qualification Tournament	2	Sayed Abdelmoneim (EGY); Tarek Benaissa (ALG)
Pan American Qualification Tournament	2	Hanser Meoque (CUB); Ellis Coleman (USA)
Asian Qualification Tournament	2	Sheng Jiang (CHN); Ryutaro Matsumoto (JPN)
European Qualification Tournament	2	Kamran Mammadov (AZE); Matti Kettunen (FIN)
1st World Qualification Tournament	3	Lenur Temirov (UKR); Tarik Belmadani (FRA); Rahman Bilici (TUR)
2nd World Qualification Tournament	2	Revaz Lashkhi (GEO); Stig-André Berge (NOR)
Invitational / Host Country	0	—
Total	19	

=== 66 kg ===
Competition	Places	Qualified wrestlers
2011 World Championships	6	Saeid Abdevali (IRI); Manuchar Tskhadaia (GEO); Kim Hyeon-woo (KOR); Pedro Mulens (CUB); Frank Stäbler (GER); Justin Lester (USA)
African & Oceania Qualification Tournament	2	Mohamed Serir (ALG); Ashraf El-Gharably (EGY)
Pan American Qualification Tournament	2	Orlando Huacón (ECU); Wuileixis Rivas (VEN)
Asian Qualification Tournament	2	Darkhan Bayakhmetov (KAZ); Tsutomu Fujimura (JPN)
European Qualification Tournament	2	Steeve Guénot (FRA); Edgaras Venckaitis (LTU)
1st World Qualification Tournament	3	Tamás Lőrincz (HUN); Pascal Strebel (SUI); Aleksandar Maksimović (SRB)
2nd World Qualification Tournament	2	Atakan Yüksel (TUR); Hovhannes Varderesyan (ARM)
Invitational / Host Country	0	—
Total	19	

=== 74 kg ===
Competition	Places	Qualified wrestlers
2011 World Championships	6	Roman Vlasov (RUS); Selçuk Çebi (TUR); Neven Žugaj (CRO); Arsen Julfalakyan (ARM); Robert Rosengren (SWE); Askhat Dilmukhamedov (KAZ)
African & Oceania Qualification Tournament	2	Zied Ayet Ikram (TUN); Islam Tolba (EGY)
Pan American Qualification Tournament	2	Jorgisbell Álvarez (CUB); Andy Bisek (USA)
Asian Qualification Tournament	2	Kim Jin-hyeok (KOR); Daniar Kobonov (KGZ)
European Qualification Tournament	2	Zurabi Datunashvili (GEO); Mark Madsen (DEN)
1st World Qualification Tournament	3	Emin Ahmadov (AZE); Aliaksandr Kikiniou (BLR); Péter Bácsi (HUN)
2nd World Qualification Tournament	2	Aleksandr Kazakevič (LTU); Christophe Guénot (FRA)
Invitational / Host Country	0	—
Total	19	

=== 84 kg ===
Competition	Places	Qualified wrestlers
2011 World Championships	6	Alim Selimau (BLR); Damian Janikowski (POL); Nazmi Avluca (TUR); Rami Hietaniemi (FIN); Alan Khugaev (RUS); Saman Tahmasebi (AZE)
African & Oceania Qualification Tournament	2	Karam Gaber (EGY); Haykel Achouri (TUN)
Pan American Qualification Tournament	2	Pablo Shorey (CUB); Chas Betts (USA)
Asian Qualification Tournament	2	Daniyal Gadzhiyev (KAZ); Lee Se-yeol (KOR)
European Qualification Tournament	2	Vasyl Rachyba (UKR); Amer Hrustanović (AUT)
1st World Qualification Tournament	3	Habibollah Akhlaghi (IRI); Nenad Žugaj (CRO); Mélonin Noumonvi (FRA)
2nd World Qualification Tournament	2	Hristo Marinov (BUL); Vladimer Gegeshidze (GEO)
Invitational / Host Country	1	Keitani Graham (FSM)
Total	20	

=== 96 kg ===
Competition	Places	Qualified wrestlers
2011 World Championships	6	Elis Guri (BUL); Jimmy Lidberg (SWE); Rustam Totrov (RUS); Cenk İldem (TUR); Mohamed Abdelfatah (EGY); Tsimafei Dzeinichenka (BLR)
African & Oceania Qualification Tournament	2	Hassine Ayari (TUN); Choucri Atafi (MAR)
Pan American Qualification Tournament	2	Yunior Estrada (CUB); Erwin Caraballo (VEN)
Asian Qualification Tournament	2	Ghasem Rezaei (IRI); Norikatsu Saikawa (JPN)
European Qualification Tournament	2	Artur Aleksanyan (ARM); Ardo Arusaar (EST)
1st World Qualification Tournament	3	Shalva Gadabadze (AZE); Daigoro Timoncini (ITA); Soso Jabidze (GEO)
2nd World Qualification Tournament	2	Alin Alexuc-Ciurariu (ROU); David Vála (CZE)
Invitational / Host Country	0	—
Total	19	

=== 120 kg ===
Competition	Places	Qualified wrestlers
2011 World Championships	6	Rıza Kayaalp (TUR); Mijaín López (CUB); Nurmakhan Tinaliyev (KAZ); Bashir Babajanzadeh (IRI); Mihály Deák-Bárdos (HUN); Łukasz Banak (POL)
African & Oceania Qualification Tournament	2	Radhouane Chebbi (TUN); Abdelrahman El-Trabely (EGY)
Pan American Qualification Tournament	2	Dremiel Byers (USA); Andrés Ayub (CHI)
Asian Qualification Tournament	2	Liu Deli (CHN); Muminjon Abdullaev (UZB)
European Qualification Tournament	2	Yury Patrikeyev (ARM); Yevhen Orlov (UKR)
1st World Qualification Tournament	3	Heiki Nabi (EST); Ioseb Chugoshvili (BLR); Johan Eurén (SWE)
2nd World Qualification Tournament	2	Khasan Baroev (RUS); Guram Pherselidze (GEO)
Invitational / Host Country	1	Ali Nadhim (IRQ)
Total	20	

== Women's freestyle events ==
=== 48 kg ===
Competition	Places	Qualified wrestlers
2011 World Championships	6	Hitomi Obara (JPN); Mariya Stadnik (AZE); Zhao Shasha (CHN); Zhuldyz Eshimova (KAZ); Carol Huynh (CAN); Carolina Castillo (COL)
African & Oceania Qualification Tournament	2	Isabelle Sambou (SEN); Maroi Mezien (TUN)
Pan American Qualification Tournament	2	Clarissa Chun (USA); Patricia Bermúdez (ARG)
Asian Qualification Tournament	2	Kim Hyung-joo (KOR); Nguyễn Thị Lụa (VIE)
European Qualification Tournament	2	Iwona Matkowska (POL); Alexandra Engelhardt (GER)
1st World Qualification Tournament	2	Davaasükhiin Otgontsetseg (MGL); Vanesa Kaladzinskaya (BLR)
2nd World Qualification Tournament	2	Iryna Merleni (UKR); Mayelis Caripá (VEN)
Invitational / Host Country	1	Tanoh Benie (CIV)
Total	19	

=== 55 kg ===
Competition	Places	Qualified wrestlers
2011 World Championships	6	Saori Yoshida (JPN); Tonya Verbeek (CAN); Tetyana Lazareva (UKR); Ida-Theres Nerell (SWE); Maria Gurova (RUS); Helen Maroulis (USA)
African & Oceania Qualification Tournament	2	Marwa Amri (TUN); Rabab Eid (EGY)
Pan American Qualification Tournament	2	Marcia Andrades (VEN); Lissette Antes (ECU)
Asian Qualification Tournament	2	Geeta Phogat (IND); Um Ji-eun (KOR)
European Qualification Tournament	2	Yuliya Ratkevich (AZE); Maria Prevolaraki (GRE)
1st World Qualification Tournament	2	Han Kum-ok (PRK); Sündeviin Byambatseren (MGL)
2nd World Qualification Tournament	2	Jackeline Rentería (COL); Joice Silva (BRA)
Invitational / Host Country	1	Olga Butkevych (GBR)
Total	19	

=== 63 kg ===
Competition	Places	Qualified wrestlers
2011 World Championships	6	Kaori Icho (JPN); Marianna Sastin (HUN); Ochirbatyn Nasanburmaa (MGL); Jing Ruixue (CHN); Kim Ran-mi (PRK); Elena Pirozhkova (USA)
African & Oceania Qualification Tournament	2	Jacira Mendonca (GBS); Blessing Oborududu (NGR)
Pan American Qualification Tournament	2	Martine Dugrenier (CAN); Katerina Vidiaux (CUB)
Asian Qualification Tournament	2	Yelena Shalygina (KAZ); Aisuluu Tynybekova (KGZ)
European Qualification Tournament	2	Yuliya Ostapchuk (UKR); Lubov Volosova (RUS)
1st World Qualification Tournament	2	Henna Johansson (SWE); Elif Jale Yeşilırmak (TUR)
2nd World Qualification Tournament	2	Monika Michalik (POL); Anastasija Grigorjeva (LAT)
Invitational / Host Country	2	Sylvie Datty (CAF); Maria Dunn (GUM)
Total	20	

=== 72 kg ===
Competition	Places	Qualified wrestlers
2011 World Championships	6	Stanka Zlateva (BUL); Ekaterina Bukina (RUS); Ali Bernard (USA); Vasilisa Marzaliuk (BLR); Guzel Manyurova (KAZ); Annabelle Ali (CMR)
African & Oceania Qualification Tournament	2	Amarachi Obiajunwa (NGR); Josiane Soloniaina (MAD)
Pan American Qualification Tournament	2	Leah Callahan (CAN); Ana Talía Betancur (COL)
Asian Qualification Tournament	2	Wang Jiao (CHN); Kyoko Hamaguchi (JPN)
European Qualification Tournament	2	Jenny Fransson (SWE); Kateryna Burmistrova (UKR)
1st World Qualification Tournament	2	Ochirbatyn Burmaa (MGL); Svetlana Saenko (MDA)
2nd World Qualification Tournament	2	Maider Unda (ESP); Cynthia Vescan (FRA)
Invitational / Host Country	0	—
Total	18	
