= 2012 African & Oceania Wrestling Olympic Qualification Tournament =

The 2012 Olympic Wrestling African & Oceania Qualification Tournament was the first regional qualifying tournament for the 2012 Olympics.

The top two wrestlers in each weight class earn a qualification spot for their nation.

== Men's freestyle ==
=== 55 kg ===
16 March

Round of 16
Ebikewenimo Welson (NGR)	0	0
Ibrahim Farag (EGY)	1	7

Quarterfinals
Hamza Fatah (MAR)
Hel Here (CHA)
Justin Holland (AUS)
Sem Shilimela (NAM)
Ismail Moussaoui (ALG)
Adama Diatta (SEN)
Bienvenu Andriamalala (MAD)	0
Ibrahim Farag (EGY)	4^{F}

Semifinals
Hamza Fatah (MAR)	0	0
Sem Shilimela (NAM)	2	3
Adama Diatta (SEN)	1	1
Ibrahim Farag (EGY)	5	1

Final
Sem Shilimela (NAM)	0	0
Ibrahim Farag (EGY)	6	8

Repechage round 1
Ebikewenimo Welson (NGR)
Bienvenu Andriamalala (MAD)

Bronze medals
Justin Holland (AUS)
Hamza Fatah (MAR)
Ebikewenimo Welson (NGR)
Adama Diatta (SEN)

=== 60 kg ===
16 March

Quarterfinals
Amas Daniel (NGR)
Victor Ngouema (CGO)
Hassan Madani (EGY)	2	1	7
Jean Bernard Diatta (SEN)	1	2	0
Judicael Mbaide (CHA)
Bentlea Oulad (MAR)
Guillaume Jockenson (MRI)	0	2
Farzad Tarash (AUS)	6	7

Semifinals
Amas Daniel (NGR)	0	2	0
Hassan Madani (EGY)	3	2	1
Bentlea Oulad (MAR)	0	2	4
Farzad Tarash (AUS)	6	0	4

Final
Hassan Madani (EGY)	6	8
Farzad Tarash (AUS)	0	0

Bronze medals
Jean Bernard Diatta (SEN)	W	O
Amas Daniel (NGR)
Guillaume Jackenson (MRI)
Bentlea Oulad (MAR)

=== 66 kg ===
16 March

Round of 16
Todisoa Ratolojanahary (MAD)
Abdulai Rogers (SLE)
Joseph Lopez (GUM)
Quintino Intipe (GBS)

Quarterfinals
Morad Bahyaoui (MAR)	0	0
Abdou Omar (EGY)	2	6
Victor Diatta (SEN)
Jayden Lawrence (AUS)
Gaston Taocreno (CHA)
Haithem Ben Alayech (TUN)
Todisoa Ratolojanahary (MAD)
Quintino Intipe (GBS)

Semifinals
Abdou Omar (EGY)	7	3
Jayden Lawrence (AUS)	0	0
Haithem Ben Alayech (TUN)
Quintino Intipe (GBS)

Final
Abdou Omar (EGY)	5	5
Haithem Ben Alayech (TUN)	0	0

Bronze medals
Morad Bahyaoui (MAR)
Jayden Lawrence (AUS)
Gaston Taocreno (CHA)
Quintino Intipe (GBS)

=== 74 kg ===
16 March

Round of 16
Ali Abdo (AUS)
Brou Arnaud Kouadio (CIV)
Mustapha Selloum (MAR)
Nicholas Diatta (SEN)
Alpha Bangura (SLE)
Bernard Andrianirinamalala (MAD)

Quarterfinals
Hamadi Idriss (CHA)	0	0
Mohamed Bassem (EGY)	1	4^{F}
Augusto Midana (GBS)
Sammy Nyongesa (KEN)
Bilel Ouechtati (TUN)
Ali Abdo (AUS)
Mustapha Selloum (MAR)
Bernard Andrianirinamalala (MAD)

Semifinals
Mohamed Bassem (EGY)	0	0
Augusto Midana (GBS)	5	2
Bilel Ouechtati (TUN)
Mustapha Selloum (MAR)

Final
Augusto Midana (GBS)
Bilel Ouechtati (TUN)

Bronze medals
Sammy Nyongesa (KEN)	0	0
Mohamed Bassem (EGY)	5	3
Ali Abdo (AUS)
Mustapha Selloum (MAR)

=== 84 kg ===
16 March

Round of 16
Mohamed Riad Louafi (ALG)
Abdou Sambou (SEN)

Quarterfinals
Adnan Rhimi (TUN)
Tchetev Poumeugne (CMR)
Andrew Dick (NGR)
Djakna Malick (CHA)
Miligy Ahmed (EGY)	6	7^{F}
Faisal Attayee (NZL)	0	0
Khalid Lahjila (MAR)
Mohamed Riad Louafi (ALG)

Semifinals
Adnan Rhimi (TUN)
Andrew Dick (NGR)
Miligy Ahmed (EGY)	5	6
Mohamed Riad Louafi (ALG)	0	1

Final
Andrew Dick (NGR)	0	0
Miligy Ahmed (EGY)	1	3

Bronze medals
Djakna Malick (CHA)
Adnan Rhimi (TUN)
Faisal Attayee (NZL)
Mohamed Riad Louafi (ALG)

- Miligy Ahmed originally qualified for the Olympics, but was later disqualified for doping, giving the spot to Mohamed Riad Louafi.

=== 96 kg ===
16 March

Round of 16
Reda Hinani (MAR)
Mohamed Barrie (SLE)

Quarterfinals
Priscus Fogagnolo (AUS)	1	1	1
Mostafa Farhat (EGY)	1	1	5
Angula Shikongo (NAM)
Fethi Eddouh (ALG)
Anicet Koulahi (CIV)
C. J. Floor (ASA)
Maurice Abatam (CHA)
Reda Hinani (MAR)

Semifinals
Mostafa Farhat (EGY)	6	6
Fethi Eddouh (ALG)	0	0
C. J. Floor (ASA)	3^{F}
Reda Hinani (MAR)	1

Final
Mostafa Farhat (EGY)
C. J. Floor (ASA)

Bronze medals
Priscus Fogagnolo (AUS)
Fethi Eddouh (ALG)
Anicet Koulahi (CIV)
Reda Hinani (MAR)

=== 120 kg ===
17 March

Pos	Athlete	Pld	W	L	CP	TP	EGY	SEN	NZL	KEN	PLW
1	El-Desoky Ismail (EGY)	4	4	0	14	24	—	1–0, 2–0	6–0, 6–2	3–0 F	4–0, 2–0 F
2	Malal Ndiaye (SEN)	4	3	1	11	20	0–3 PO	—	3–0, 5–0	2–0, 4–0 F	2–0, 4–0 F
3	Marcus Carney (NZL)	4	1	3	5	16	1–3 PP	0–3 PO	—	4–0, 6–0	0–2, 4–6
4	Hollis Ochieng (KEN)	4	1	3	4	4	0–4 VT	0–4 VT	0–3 PO	—	4–2 F
5	Florian Skilang Temengil (PLW)	4	1	3	3	10	0–4 VT	0–4 VT	3–1 PP	0–4 VT	—

Source: UWW

== Men's Greco-Roman ==
=== 55 kg ===
17 March

Pos	Athlete	Pld	W	L	CP	TP	EGY	MAR	ALG	TUN	PLW
1	Mohamed Abouhalima (EGY)	4	4	0	12	19	—	4–1, 2–0	1–0, 1–2, 3–0	2–0, 1–0	2–0, 3–0
2	Fouad Fajari (MAR)	4	3	1	10	12	1–3 PP	—	1–0, 2–1	2–0, 2–0	3–0, 1–0
3	Mohammed Bouterfessa (ALG)	4	1	3	7	11	1–3 PP	1–3 PP	—	0–2, 1–3	1–0, 6–0 F
4	Saber Bouthouri (TUN)	4	2	2	6	11	0–3 PO	0–3 PO	3–1 PP	—	5–0, 1–0
5	Elgin Loren Elwais (PLW)	4	0	4	0	0	0–3 PO	0–3 PO	0–4 VT	0–3 PO	—

Source: UWW

=== 60 kg ===
17 March

Quarterfinals
Hatem Aouidete (TUN)	3	6
Radley Umang (PLW)	1	0
Tarek Benaissa (ALG)	4	3
Deon Swart (AUS)	0	0

Semifinals
Sayed Abdelmoneim (EGY)	3	3
Mourad El-Bakali (MAR)	0	2
Hatem Aouidete (TUN)	0	1	2
Tarek Benaissa (ALG)	2	1	4

Final
Sayed Abdelmoneim (EGY)	2	4
Tarek Benaissa (ALG)	0	3

Bronze medals
Bye
Mourad El-Bakali (MAR)
Deon Swart (AUS)	0	0
Hatem Aouidete (TUN)	6	7

=== 66 kg ===
17 March

Pos	Athlete	Pld	W	L	CP	TP	ALG	EGY	TUN	MAR	AUS
1	Mohamed Serir (ALG)	4	3	1	11	27	—	1–0, 1–2, 0–4	3–0, 3–0	5–0, 6–0	1–0, 7–3 F
2	Ashraf El-Gharably (EGY)	4	3	1	11	29	3–1 PP	—	4–0, 0–5, 0–1	1–0, 5–0	6–0, 7–0
3	Jihad Khelifi (TUN)	4	3	1	11	19	0–3 PO	3–1 PP	—	6–0, 7–0	WO
4	Noureddine Ben Abdelwahab (MAR)	4	1	3	4	0	0–3 PO	0–3 PO	0–4 ST	—	WO
5	Mehrdad Tarash (AUS)	4	0	4	0	3	0–4 VT	0–4 ST	0–4 VF	0–4 VF	—

Source: UWW

=== 74 kg ===
17 March

Quarterfinals
Zied Ayet Ikram (TUN)	2	1
Abdulai Salam (SLE)	0	0
Islam Tolba (EGY)	3	5
Aziz Boualem (MAR)	0	0
Hassan Shahsavan (AUS)	1	1
Perefaghe Kiribein (NGR)	0	0

Semifinals
Abdelkrim Ouakali (ALG)	0	0
Zied Ayet Ikram (TUN)	1	1
Islam Tolba (EGY)	0	2	1
Hassan Shahsavan (AUS)	1	0	0

Final
Sayed Abdelmoneim (EGY)	2	4
Tarek Benaissa (ALG)	0	3

Bronze medals
Abdulai Salam (SLE)	0	0
Abdelkrim Ouakali (ALG)	1	2
Aziz Boualem (MAR)	W	O
Hassan Shahsavan (AUS)

=== 84 kg ===
17 March

Round of 16
Karam Gaber (EGY)	W	O
Ali Abdo (AUS)

Quarterfinals
Efionayi Agbanabare (NGR)	2	2
Keitani Graham (FSM)	0	0
Said Moulla (MAR)	0	0
Haykel Achouri (TUN)	1	2
Robert Kinsonga (COD)	7	2
Edward Bangura (SLE)	0	0
Messaoud Zeghdane (ALG)	0	2	0
Karam Gaber (EGY)	6	0	3

Semifinals
Efionayi Agbanabare (NGR)	0	0
Haykel Achouri (TUN)	1	1
Robert Kinsonga (COD)	0	0
Karam Gaber (EGY)	6	7

Final
Haykel Achouri (TUN)	0	0
Karam Gaber (EGY)	6	6

Repechage round 1
Ali Abdo (AUS)
Messaoud Zeghdane (ALG)	W	O

Bronze medals
Said Moulla (MAR)	W	O
Efionayi Agbanabare (NGR)
Messaoud Zeghdane (ALG)	3^{F}
Robert Kinsonga (COD)	2

=== 96 kg ===
18 March

Pos	Athlete	Pld	W	L	CP	TP	TUN	MAR	COD	AUS
1	Hassine Ayari (TUN)	3	3	0	10	9	—	1–0, 1–0	2–0, 1–0	4–0 F
2	Choucri Atafi (MAR)	3	2	1	6	6	0–3 PO	—	2–0, 1–0	2–0, 1–0
3	David Fukwabo (COD)	3	1	2	3	4	0–3 PO	0–3 PO	—	1–0, 0–1, 3–1
4	Priscus Fogagnolo (AUS)	3	0	3	1	2	0–4 VT	0–3 PO	1–3 PP	—

Source: UWW

=== 120 kg ===
18 March

Pos	Athlete	Pld	W	L	CP	TP	TUN	EGY	AUS	MAR
1	Radhouane Chebbi (TUN)	3	3	0	9	8	—	1–0, 0–1, 1–0	2–0, 1–0	2–0, 1–0
2	Abdelrahman El-Trabely (EGY)	3	2	1	7	10	1–3 PP	—	2–0, 0–5, 2–0	2–0, 3–0
3	Ivan Popov (AUS)	3	1	2	4	8	0–3 PO	1–3 PP	—	2–0, 1–0
4	Zakaria Echiheb (MAR)	3	0	3	0	0	0–3 PO	0–3 PO	0–3 PO	—

Source: UWW

== Women's freestyle ==
=== 48 kg ===
18 March

Round of 16
Carissa Holland (AUS)	0	0
Maroi Mezien (TUN)	1	2

Quarterfinals
Rebecca Muambo (CMR)	0	0
Isabelle Sambou (SEN)	1	4
Tanoh Benie (CIV)	0	0
Mona Samir (EGY)	4	6
Sammy Oziti (NGR)	8	6^{F}
Adama Diatta (SLE)	0	0
Chaimaa Lotfy (MAR)	0
Maroi Mezien (TUN)	5^{F}

Semifinals
Isabelle Sambou (SEN)	1	1
Mona Samir (EGY)	0	0
Sammy Oziti (NGR)	0	1
Maroi Mezien (TUN)	1	7^{F}

Final
Isabelle Sambou (SEN)	1	1
Maroi Mezien (TUN)	0	0

Repechage round 1
Carissa Holland (AUS)	4	5
Chaimaa Lotfy (MAR)	1	1

Bronze medals
Rebecca Muambo (CMR)	0	2	1
Mona Samir (EGY)	1	0	0
Carissa Holland (AUS)	0	0
Sammy Oziti (NGR)	3	6

=== 55 kg ===
18 March

Quarterfinals
Rokhyatou Sonko (SEN)	6	4
Marina Kouadio (CIV)	0	0
Hasnaa Haja (MAR)	0	0
Marwa Amri (TUN)	3	1
Edwige Ngono (CMR)	0	0
Lovina Odohi (NGR)	1	1

Semifinals
Rabab Eid (EGY)	3^{F}
Rokhyatou Sonko (SEN)	0
Marwa Amri (TUN)	1	0	6^{F}
Lovina Odohi (NGR)	0	1	1

Final
Rabab Eid (EGY)	0	0
Marwa Amri (TUN)	1	4

Bronze medals
Bye
Rokhyatou Sonko (SEN)
Hasnaa Haja (MAR)	1	0	0
Lovina Odohi (NGR)	0	1	1

=== 63 kg ===
18 March

Round of 16
Hela Riabi (TUN)	2	3
Maminirina Rafaliharisolo (MAD)	0	1
Sylvie Datty (CAF)	2	4
Nadia Moussaoui (ALG)	0	0
Joyce Milazar (MRI)	8	3
Maria Dunn (GUM)	5	0
Sire Diédhiou (SEN)	0	0
Enas Mostafa (EGY)	4	3^{F}
Sanoa Mandar (MAR)	0	0
Jacira Mendonca (GBS)	5	5

Quarterfinals
Blessing Oborududu (NGR)	4^{F}
Leah Ndungu (KEN)	0
Blandine Metala (CMR)	0	3
Hela Riabi (TUN)	1	3
Sylvie Datty (CAF)	2	2
Joyce Milazar (MRI)	0	0
Enas Mostafa (EGY)	0	1
Jacira Mendonca (GBS)	1	3

Semifinals
Blessing Oborududu (NGR)	7	4
Hela Riabi (TUN)	0	0
Sylvie Datty (CAF)	0	2
Jacira Mendonca (GBS)	1	4

Final
Blessing Oborududu (NGR)	1	6	2
Jacira Mendonca (GBS)	2	0	3

Repechage round 1
Sanoa Mandar (MAR)	1	0
Enas Mostafa (EGY)	1	1

Bronze medals
Leah Ndungu (KEN)	0	0
Hela Riabi (TUN)	5	5
Enas Mostafa (EGY)	2	1
Sylvie Datty (CAF)	0	0

=== 72 kg ===
18 March

Quarterfinals
Nadia Antar (EGY)	7	5
Emma Chalmers (AUS)	0	0
Samalia Berger-Mata'afa (ASA)	0	0
Amarachi Obiajunwa (NGR)	6	6

Semifinals
Josiane Soloniaina (MAD)	3^{F}
Hajaratu Kamara (SLE)	0
Nadia Antar (EGY)	1	0
Amarachi Obiajunwa (NGR)	1	6

Final
Josiane Soloniaina (MAD)	7	0	2
Amarachi Obiajunwa (NGR)	0	5	6

Bronze medals
Bye
Hajaratu Kamara (SLE)
Samalia Berger-Mata'afa (ASA)	0	0
Nadia Antar (EGY)	7	6
