= Tunisia at the 2012 Summer Olympics =

- IOC code: TUN
- NOC: Tunisian Olympic Committee
- Website: www.cnot.org.tn (in French)

in London
- Competitors: 83 in 17 sports
- Flag bearers: Heykel Megannem (opening); Oussama Mellouli (closing)
- Medals Ranked 35th: Gold 2 Silver 0 Bronze 1 Total 3

Summer Olympics appearances (overview)
- 1960; 1964; 1968; 1972; 1976; 1980; 1984; 1988; 1992; 1996; 2000; 2004; 2008; 2012; 2016; 2020; 2024; 2028

Tunisia competed at the 2012 Summer Olympics in London, from 27 July to 12 August 2012. This was the nation's thirteenth appearance at the Olympics, having missed the 1980 Summer Olympics in Moscow because of its partial support for the United States boycott.

The Tunisian Olympic Committee (French: Comité National Olympique Tunisien, CNOT) sent the nation's largest delegation to the Games, surpassing the number of athletes sent to Beijing by almost two thirds. A total of 83 athletes, 63 men and 20 women, competed in 17 sports. Men's basketball, men's handball, and men's indoor volleyball were the only team-based sports in which Tunisia was represented at these Olympic Games. There was only a single competitor in artistic gymnastics, sailing, shooting, and taekwondo.

Notable Tunisian athletes included freestyle swimmer and defending champion Oussama Mellouli, who competed at his fourth Olympics, tennis player and former Youth Olympic games participant Ons Jabeur, and fencing sisters Azza and Sarra Besbes. Heykel Megannem, captain of Tunisia's handball team, made his Olympic comeback in London after a twelve-year absence and was the nation's flag bearer at the opening ceremony.

Tunisia left London with three medals (one each in gold, silver, and bronze), which were all awarded to the team in athletics and swimming. This was the nation's most successful Olympics, winning the largest number of medals in its history, sending its largest delegation ever to the games due to the presence of team-based athletes, and making Olympic history for two legendary athletes. Middle-distance runner Habiba Ghribi became the first Tunisian female athlete to win an Olympic medal in the women's steeplechase and was subsequently awarded gold following the disqualification of Russian Yuliya Zaripova. Meanwhile, Oussama Mellouli became the first Olympic swimming champion at both pool and open water, and became most successful Tunisian athlete in Olympic history with two gold medals.

== Medalists ==
Medal	Name	Sport	Event	Date
Gold	Oussama Mellouli	Swimming	Men's 10 km open water	10 August
Gold	Habiba Ghribi	Athletics	Women's 3000 m steeplechase	6 August
Bronze	Oussama Mellouli	Swimming	Men's 1500 m freestyle	4 August

== Athletics ==
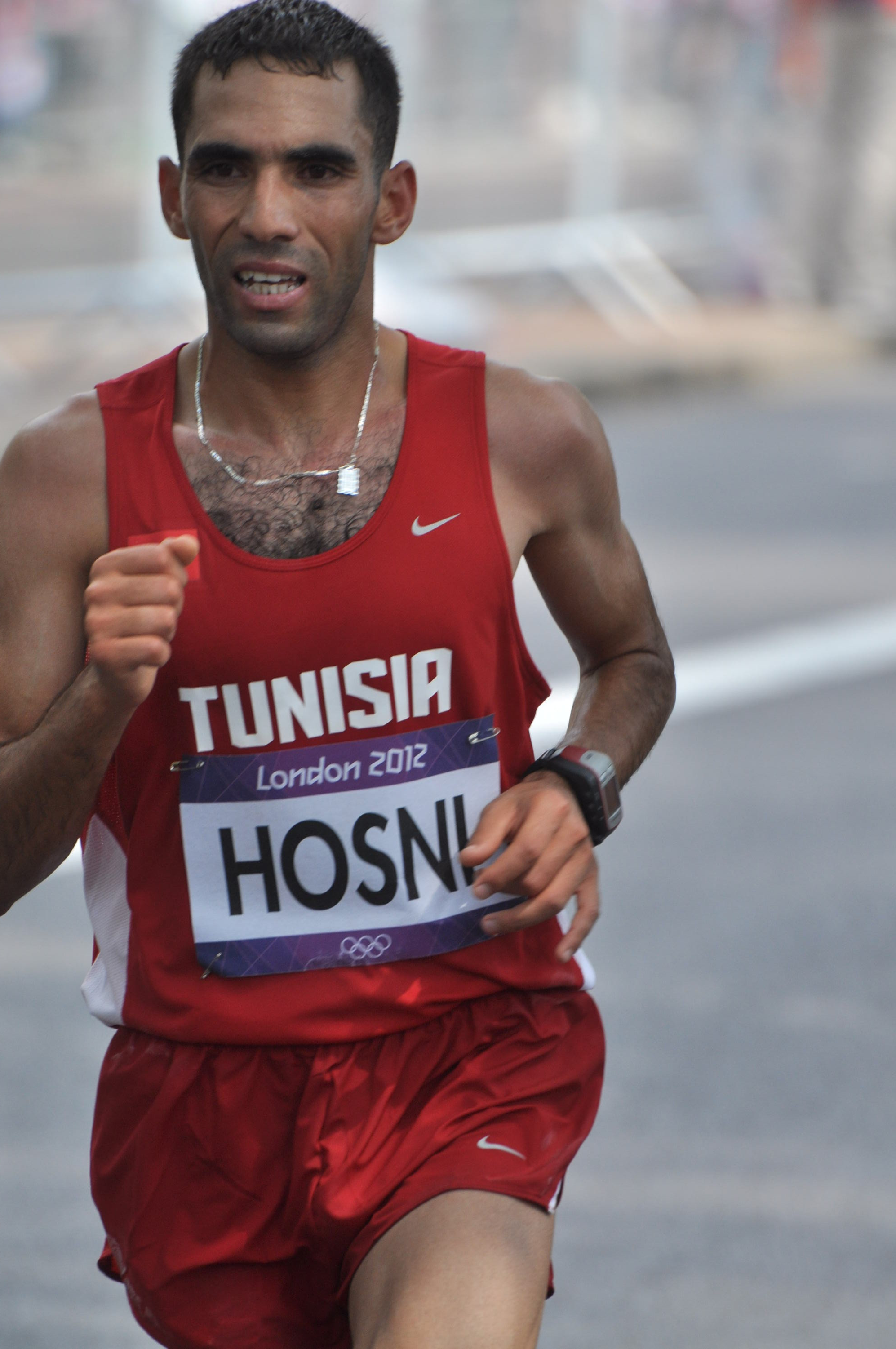
Wissem Hosni finished seventy-first in men's marathon.

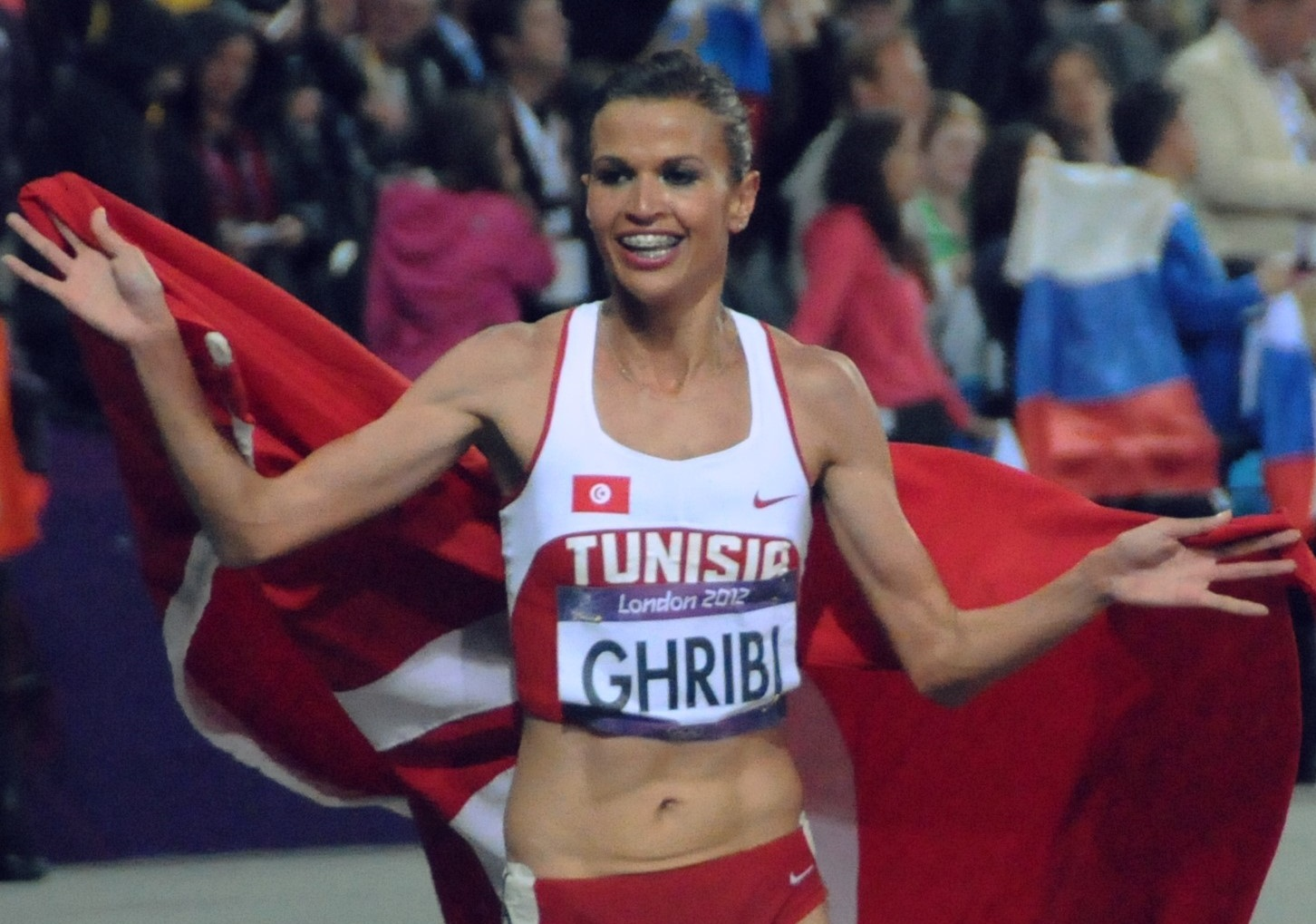
Habiba Ghribi became Tunisia's first female Olympic medalist.

Tunisian athletes have so far achieved qualifying standards in the following athletics events (up to a maximum of 3 athletes in each event at the 'A' Standard, and 1 at the 'B' Standard):

Key

- Note–Ranks given for track events are within the athlete's heat only
- Q = Qualified for the next round
- q = Qualified for the next round as a fastest loser or, in field events, by position without achieving the qualifying target
- NR = National record
- N/A = Round not applicable for the event
- Bye = Athlete not required to compete in round

Men

Athlete	Event	Heat		Final	
Athlete	Event	Result	Rank	Result	Rank
Amor Ben Yahia	3000 m steeplechase	8:22.70	7	Did not advance	
Wissem Hosni	Marathon	—N/a		2:26:43	71
Hassanine Sebei	20 km walk	—N/a		DNF	

Women

Athlete	Event	Heat		Final	
Athlete	Event	Result	Rank	Result	Rank
Amira Ben Amor	Marathon	—N/a		2:40:13	80
Habiba Ghribi	3000 m steeplechase	9:27.42	2 Q	9:08.37 NR	1st place, gold medalist(s)

== Basketball ==
Tunisia is qualified for the men's event

- Men's team event – 1 team of 12 players

=== Men's tournament ===
Roster

The following is the Tunisia roster in the men's basketball tournament of the 2012 Summer Olympics.

Tunisia men's national basketball team – 2012 Summer Olympics roster
Players
Coaches

Pos.	No.	Name	Age – Date of birth	Height	Club
F	4	Radhouane Slimane	31 – 16 August 1980	2.05 m (6 ft 9 in)	Al Nasr Dubai
G	5	Marouan Laghnej	26 – 22 April 1986	1.92 m (6 ft 4 in)	JS Kairouan
G	6	Nizar Knioua	29 – 8 June 1983	1.88 m (6 ft 2 in)	Stade Nabeulien
G	7	Mourad El Mabrouk	25 – 19 October 1986	1.85 m (6 ft 1 in)	Ezzahra Sport Rades
G	8	Marouan Kechrid	31 – 2 June 1981	1.78 m (5 ft 10 in)	US Monastir
F	9	Mohamed Hdidane	26 – 27 April 1986	2.05 m (6 ft 9 in)	Stade Nabeulien
F	10	Mehdi Hafsi	34 – 23 February 1978	2.03 m (6 ft 8 in)	ESSM Le Portel
C	11	Mokhtar Ghyaza	25 – 15 November 1986	2.04 m (6 ft 8 in)	Ezzahra Sport Rades
F	12	Makrem Ben Romdhane	23 – 27 March 1989	2.04 m (6 ft 8 in)	Étoile Sportive du Sahel
F	13	Amine Rzig	31 – 25 August 1980	1.98 m (6 ft 6 in)	Étoile Sportive du Sahel
F	14	Youssef Gaddour	22 – 15 March 1990	2.03 m (6 ft 8 in)	US Monastir
C	15	Salah Mejri	26 – 15 June 1986	2.17 m (7 ft 1 in)	Étoile Sportive du Sahel

Head coach

- Adel Tlatli

Legend

- Club – describes last
  club before the tournament
- Age – describes age
  on 29 July 2012

Group play

Pos	Team	Pld	W	L	PF	PA	PD	Pts	Qualification
1	United States	5	5	0	589	398	+191	10	Quarterfinals
2	France	5	4	1	376	378	−2	9	Quarterfinals
3	Argentina	5	3	2	448	424	+24	8	Quarterfinals
4	Lithuania	5	2	3	395	399	−4	7	Quarterfinals
5	Nigeria	5	1	4	338	456	−118	6	
6	Tunisia	5	0	5	320	411	−91	5	

Source: FIBA archive
Rules for classification: 1) points; 2) head-to-head points; 3) head-to-head goal average; 4) head-to-head number of points scored.

29 July 2012
09:00

Report

Nigeria	60–56	Tunisia
Scoring by quarter: 18–7, 13–8, 14–16, 15–25
Pts: Aminu 15; Rebs: Diogu 10; Asts: Skinn 3		Pts: Rzig 18; Rebs: Ben Romdhane 12; Asts: three players 3

Basketball Arena, London
Referees: Ilija Belošević (SRB), Marcos Benito (BRA), Rabah Noujaim (LIB)

31 July 2012
22:15

Report

Tunisia	63–110	United States
Scoring by quarter: 15–21, 18–25, 14–39, 16–25
Pts: Ben Romdhane 22; Rebs: Ben Romdhane 11; Asts: Ben Romdhane 4		Pts: Love, Anthony 16; Rebs: Durant 10; Asts: Paul 7

Basketball Arena, London
Referees: Vaughan Mayberry (AUS), Samir Abaakil (MAR), Oļegs Latiševs (LAT)

2 August 2012
14:30

Report

Argentina	92–69	Tunisia
Scoring by quarter: 14–28, 26–12, 31–16, 21–13
Pts: Ginóbili 24; Rebs: Scola 10; Asts: Campazzo 7		Pts: Mejri 19; Rebs: Mejri 14; Asts: Laghnej 6

Basketball Arena, London
Referees: Guerrino Cerebuch (ITA), Michael Aylen (AUS), Borys Ryschyk (UKR)

4 August 2012
09:00

Report

Tunisia	69–73	France
Scoring by quarter: 15–20, 12–15, 16–25, 26–13
Pts: Hdidane 20; Rebs: Ben Romdhane 8 Asts: Laghnej, Mejri 3		Pts: Parker 22; Rebs: Batum 8 Asts: Diaw 5

Basketball Arena, London
Referees: Guerrino Cerebuch (ITA), Bill Kennedy (USA), Vaughan Mayberry (AUS)

6 August 2012
11:15

Report

Tunisia	63–76	Lithuania
Scoring by quarter: 18–7, 17–22, 19–21, 9–26
Pts: Rzig 17; Rebs: Mejri 12; Asts: Mejri 3		Pts: Songaila, Jasikevičius 13; Rebs: Kleiza, Valančiūnas 6 Asts: Kalnietis 9

Basketball Arena, London
Referees: Juan Arteaga (ESP), Saša Pukl (SLO), Felicia Grinter (USA)

== Boxing ==
Tunisia has so far qualified boxers for the following events

Men

Athlete	Event	Round of 32	Round of 16	Quarterfinals	Semifinals	Final	
Athlete	Event	Opposition Result	Opposition Result	Opposition Result	Opposition Result	Opposition Result	Rank
Ahmed Mejri	Lightweight	Chitou (BEN); W 16–9	Verdejo (PUR); L 7–16	Did not advance			
Abderrazak Houya	Light welterweight	Hajialiyev (AZE); W 19–16	Horn (AUS); L 11–17	Did not advance			
Yahia El-Mekachari	Light heavyweight	Qurbonov (TJK); W 16–8	Rasulov (UZB); L 6–13	Did not advance			

Women

Athlete	Event	Round of 16	Quarterfinals	Semifinals	Final	
Athlete	Event	Opposition Result	Opposition Result	Opposition Result	Opposition Result	Rank
Maroua Rahali	Flyweight	Bye	Kom (IND); L 6–15	Did not advance		
Rim Jouini	Lightweight	Pritchard (NZL); L 10–15	Did not advance			

== Canoeing ==
=== Sprint ===
Tunisia has qualified boats for the following events

Athlete	Event	Heats		Semifinals		Final	
Athlete	Event	Time	Rank	Time	Rank	Time	Rank
Khaled Houcine	Men's C-1 200 m	44.395	4 Q	44.373	7	Did not advance	
Mohamed Ali Mrabet	Men's K-1 200 m	38.291	7	Did not advance			
Mohamed Ali Mrabet	Men's K-1 1000 m	3:32.204	4 Q	3:44.545	8 FB	3:33.515	13
Afef Ben Ismail	Women's K-1 200 m	48.998	7	Did not advance			
Afef Ben Ismail	Women's K-1 500 m	2:07.705	6 Q	2:15.362	8	Did not advance	

Qualification Legend: FA = Qualify to final (medal); FB = Qualify to final B (non-medal)

== Fencing ==
Tunisia has qualified 6 fencers.

Men

Athlete	Event	Round of 64	Round of 32	Round of 16	Quarterfinal	Semifinal	Final / BM	
Athlete	Event	Opposition Score	Opposition Score	Opposition Score	Opposition Score	Opposition Score	Opposition Score	Rank
Mohamed Samandi	Individual foil	Rosowsky (GBR); W 15–8	Cassarà (ITA); L 7–15	Did not advance				
Hicheim Samandi	Individual sabre	Jansen (VEN); L 13–15	Did not advance					

Women

Athlete	Event	Round of 64	Round of 32	Round of 16	Quarterfinal	Semifinal	Final / BM	
Athlete	Event	Opposition Score	Opposition Score	Opposition Score	Opposition Score	Opposition Score	Opposition Score	Rank
Sarra Besbes	Individual épée	Bye	Luo Xj (CHN); W 15–9	Choi I-j (KOR); W 12–11	Heidemann (GER); L 12–15	Did not advance		
Ines Boubakri	Individual foil	Bye	Ross (USA); W 15–8	Guyart (FRA); W 15–10	Vezzali (ITA); L 7–8	Did not advance		
Azza Besbes	Individual sabre	—N/a	Au S Y (HKG); W 15–13	Wozniak (USA); L 13–15	Did not advance			
Amira Ben Chaabane	Individual sabre	—N/a	Chen Xd (CHN); L 12–15	Did not advance				

== Gymnastics ==
Tunisia has qualified in the following events.

=== Artistic ===
Men

Athlete	Event	Qualification								Final							
Athlete	Event	Apparatus						Total	Rank	Apparatus						Total	Rank
Athlete	Event	F	PH	R	V	PB	HB	Total	Rank	F	PH	R	V	PB	HB	Total	Rank
Wajdi Bouallègue	Floor	13.708	—N/a					13.708	60	Did not advance							

== Handball ==
Tunisia will participate to the Olympic Games as the defending Africa Champion.

- Men's team event – 1 team of 14 players

=== Men's tournament ===
The following is the Tunisia roster in the men's handball tournament of the 2012 Summer Olympics.

Head coaches: Alain Portes

No.	Pos.	Name	Date of birth (age)	Height	App.	Goals	Club
3	LB	Selim Hedoui	1 October 1983 (aged 28)	1.99 m			(Qatar) Al-Arabi
4	RW	Aymen Toumi	11 July 1990 (aged 22)	1.84 m			(Tunisia) Étoile Sportive
5	P	Mahmoud Gharbi	11 February 1982 (aged 30)	1.91 m			(France) HBC Nantes
6	P	Issam Tej	29 July 1979 (aged 33)	1.87 m			(France) Montpellier AHB
7	RW	Jaleleddine Touati	12 July 1982 (aged 30)	1.79 m			(France) Dunkerque HB
8	LB	Wissem Hmam	21 April 1981 (aged 31)	1.98 m			(France) Montpellier AHB
9	RB	Amine Bannour	21 February 1990 (aged 22)	1.97 m			(Tunisia) Club Africain
10	CB	Kamel Alouini	6 July 1988 (aged 24)	1.87 m			(Tunisia) Club Africain
12	GK	Marouen Maggaiz	28 July 1983 (aged 29)	1.91 m			(France) HBC Nantes
16	GK	Wassim Helal	16 July 1982 (aged 30)	1.93 m			(Tunisia) Espérance Sportive
17	LB	Wael Jallouz	3 May 1991 (aged 21)	1.98 m			(Tunisia) AS Hammamet
20	CB	Heykel Megannem	28 February 1977 (aged 35)	1.86 m			(France) Saint-Raphaël HB
21	LW	Anouar Ayed	9 May 1978 (aged 34)	1.80 m			(France) Fénix Toulouse
22	LW	Oussama Boughanmi	5 February 1990 (aged 22)	1.85 m			(Tunisia) Club Africain
31	P	Marouan Chouiref	27 May 1990 (aged 22)	1.97 m			(Tunisia) Club Africain

Group play

Team	Pld	W	D	L	GF	GA	GD	Pts	Qualification
Iceland	5	5	0	0	167	132	+35	10	Quarter-finals
France	5	4	0	1	159	110	+49	8	Quarter-finals
Sweden	5	3	0	2	156	115	+41	6	Quarter-finals
Tunisia	5	2	0	3	121	125	−4	4	Quarter-finals
Argentina	5	1	0	4	113	138	−25	2	
Great Britain	5	0	0	5	96	192	−96	0	

29 July 2012; 14:30	Sweden	28 – 21	Tunisia	Copper Box, London; Attendance: 4,155; Referees: Raluy López, Sabroso (ESP)
29 July 2012; 14:30	Doder 8	(16–11)	Boughanmi 6	Copper Box, London; Attendance: 4,155; Referees: Raluy López, Sabroso (ESP)
29 July 2012; 14:30	3× (yellow card) 4× (suspension)	Report	3× (yellow card) 5× (suspension)	Copper Box, London; Attendance: 4,155; Referees: Raluy López, Sabroso (ESP)

31 July 2012; 09:30	Tunisia	22 – 32	Iceland	Copper Box, London; Attendance: 3,559; Referees: Al-Nuaimi, Omar (UAE)
31 July 2012; 09:30	Bannour 10	(8–19)	Pálmarsson 8	Copper Box, London; Attendance: 3,559; Referees: Al-Nuaimi, Omar (UAE)
31 July 2012; 09:30	4× (yellow card) 3× (suspension)	Report	4× (yellow card) 5× (suspension)	Copper Box, London; Attendance: 3,559; Referees: Al-Nuaimi, Omar (UAE)

2 August 2012; 11:15	France	25 – 19	Tunisia	Copper Box, London; Attendance: 4,670; Referees: Nikolić, Stojković (SRB)
2 August 2012; 11:15	Narcisse 7	(12–11)	Bannour 5	Copper Box, London; Attendance: 4,670; Referees: Nikolić, Stojković (SRB)
2 August 2012; 11:15	4× (yellow card) 5× (suspension)	Report	4× (yellow card) 7× (suspension)	Copper Box, London; Attendance: 4,670; Referees: Nikolić, Stojković (SRB)

4 August 2012; 09:30	Tunisia	34 – 17	Great Britain	Copper Box, London; Attendance: 4,319; Referees: Gubica, Milošević (CRO)
4 August 2012; 09:30	Toumi 10	(14–8)	Edgar 5	Copper Box, London; Attendance: 4,319; Referees: Gubica, Milošević (CRO)
4 August 2012; 09:30	3× (yellow card) 5× (suspension)	Report	3× (yellow card) 6× (suspension)	Copper Box, London; Attendance: 4,319; Referees: Gubica, Milošević (CRO)

6 August 2012; 11:15	Argentina	23 – 25	Tunisia	Copper Box, London; Attendance: 4,645; Referees: Olesen, Pedersen (DEN)
6 August 2012; 11:15	Simonet 6	(12–12)	Alouini 7	Copper Box, London; Attendance: 4,645; Referees: Olesen, Pedersen (DEN)
6 August 2012; 11:15	2× (yellow card) 7× (suspension) 1× (red card)	Report	3× (yellow card) 6× (suspension) 1× (red card)	Copper Box, London; Attendance: 4,645; Referees: Olesen, Pedersen (DEN)

Quarter-final

8 August 2012; 21:30	Croatia	25 – 23	Tunisia	Basketball Arena, London; Attendance: 9,578; Referees: Marina, Minore (ARG)
8 August 2012; 21:30	Čupić 8	(11–12)	Jallouz, Alouini 4	Basketball Arena, London; Attendance: 9,578; Referees: Marina, Minore (ARG)
8 August 2012; 21:30	2× (yellow card) 3× (suspension)	Report	4× (yellow card) 5× (suspension) 1× (red card)	Basketball Arena, London; Attendance: 9,578; Referees: Marina, Minore (ARG)

== Judo ==
Tunisia has qualified 4 judokas

Athlete	Event	Round of 32	Round of 16	Quarterfinals	Semifinals	Repechage	Final / BM	
Athlete	Event	Opposition Result	Opposition Result	Opposition Result	Opposition Result	Opposition Result	Opposition Result	Rank
Faicel Jaballah	Men's +100 kg	Shynkeyev (KAZ); W 0001–0001 YUS	Riner (FRA); L 0002–0101	Did not advance				
Houda Miled	Women's −70 kg	Bye	Chen F (CHN); L 0001–1000	Did not advance				
Hana Mareghni	Women's −78 kg	Bye	Aguiar (BRA); L 0003–0020	Did not advance				
Nihal Chikhrouhou	Women's +78 kg	Bye	Altheman (BRA); L 0001–1001	Did not advance				

== Rowing ==
Tunisia has qualified the following boats.

Men

Athlete	Event	Heats		Repechage		Quarterfinals		Semifinals		Final	
Athlete	Event	Time	Rank	Time	Rank	Time	Rank	Time	Rank	Time	Rank
Aymen Mejri	Single sculls	7:21.64	5 R	7:11.94	4 SE/F	Bye		7:58.48	5 FF	7:33.62	31

Women

Athlete	Event	Heats		Repechage		Quarterfinals		Semifinals		Final	
Athlete	Event	Time	Rank	Time	Rank	Time	Rank	Time	Rank	Time	Rank
Racha Soula	Single sculls	8:19.31	6 R	8:10.76	4 FE	Bye				8:49.47	27

Qualification Legend: FA=Final A (medal); FB=Final B (non-medal); FC=Final C (non-medal); FD=Final D (non-medal); FE=Final E (non-medal); FF=Final F (non-medal); SA/B=Semifinals A/B; SC/D=Semifinals C/D; SE/F=Semifinals E/F; QF=Quarterfinals; R=Repechage

== Sailing ==
Tunisia has qualified 1 boat for each of the following events

Men

Athlete	Event	Race											Net points	Final rank
Athlete	Event	1	2	3	4	5	6	7	8	9	10	M*	Net points	Final rank
Youssef Akrout	Laser	41	36	40	44	31	39	39	33	45	~~48~~	EL	348	45

M = Medal race; EL = Eliminated – did not advance into the medal race;

== Shooting ==
Tunisia has qualified one shooter.

Women

Athlete	Event	Qualification		Final	
Athlete	Event	Points	Rank	Points	Rank
Noura Nasri	10 m air pistol	377	29	Did not advance	

== Swimming ==
Tunisian swimmers have so far achieved qualifying standards in the following events (up to a maximum of 2 swimmers in each event at the Olympic Qualifying Time (OQT), and potentially 1 at the Olympic Selection Time (OST)):

Men

Athlete	Event	Heat		Semifinal		Final	
Athlete	Event	Time	Rank	Time	Rank	Time	Rank
Ahmed Mathlouthi	200 m freestyle	1:49.68	30	Did not advance			
Oussama Mellouli	1500 m freestyle	14:46.23	2 Q	—N/a		14:40.31	3rd place, bronze medalist(s)
Oussama Mellouli	10 km open water	—N/a				1:49:55.1	1st place, gold medalist(s)
Taki Mrabet	200 m individual medley	2:01.41	29	Did not advance			
Taki Mrabet	400 m individual medley	DSQ		—N/a		Did not advance	

Women

Athlete	Event	Heat		Semifinal		Final	
Athlete	Event	Time	Rank	Time	Rank	Time	Rank
Sarra Lajnef	200 m breaststroke	2:31.15	31	Did not advance			

== Taekwondo ==
Tunisia has qualified 1 athlete.

Athlete	Event	Round of 16	Quarterfinals	Semifinals	Repechage	Bronze Medal	Final	
Athlete	Event	Opposition Result	Opposition Result	Opposition Result	Opposition Result	Opposition Result	Opposition Result	Rank
Khaoula Ben Hamza	Women's +67 kg	Baryshnikova (RUS); L 6–12	Did not advance					

== Tennis ==
Athlete	Event	Round of 64	Round of 32	Round of 16	Quarterfinals	Semifinals	Final / BM	
Athlete	Event	Opposition Score	Opposition Score	Opposition Score	Opposition Score	Opposition Score	Opposition Score	Rank
Malek Jaziri	Men's singles	Lu Y-H (TPE); W 7–6^{(12–10)}, 4–6, 6–3	Isner (USA); L 6–7^{(1–7)}, 2–6	Did not advance				
Ons Jabeur	Women's singles	Lisicki (GER); L 6–4, 0–6, 5–7	Did not advance					

== Volleyball ==
Tunisia has qualified a men's team to the indoor tournament.

- Men's team event – 1 team of 12 players

=== Men's indoor tournament ===
Team roster

The following is the Tunisian roster in the men's volleyball tournament of the 2012 Summer Olympics.

Head coach: Fethi Mkaouer

№	Name	Date of birth	Height	Weight	Spike	Block	2012 club
2	Ahmed Kadhi	19 April 1989	1.98 m (6 ft 6 in)	97 kg (214 lb)	345 cm (136 in)	318 cm (125 in)	(Tunisia) C.O. Kelibia
3	Marouane M'rabet	5 June 1985	1.86 m (6 ft 1 in)	81 kg (179 lb)	315 cm (124 in)	296 cm (117 in)	(Tunisia) C.O. Kelibia
7	Elyes Karamosli	22 August 1989	1.95 m (6 ft 5 in)	97 kg (214 lb)	320 cm (130 in)	303 cm (119 in)	(Tunisia) E.S. Tunis
8	Mohamed Ben Slimane	29 November 1981	1.87 m (6 ft 2 in)	73 kg (161 lb)	312 cm (123 in)	294 cm (116 in)	(Tunisia) E.S. Sahel
10	Hamza Nagga	29 May 1990	1.96 m (6 ft 5 in)	84 kg (185 lb)	326 cm (128 in)	311 cm (122 in)	(Tunisia) C.O. Kelibia
11	Ismail Moalla	30 January 1990	1.95 m (6 ft 5 in)	67 kg (148 lb)	324 cm (128 in)	308 cm (121 in)	(Tunisia) CS Sfaxien
12	Anouer Taouerghi (L)	17 August 1983	1.78 m (5 ft 10 in)	77 kg (170 lb)	302 cm (119 in)	292 cm (115 in)	(Tunisia) CS Sfaxien
13	Noureddine Hfaiedh (c)	27 August 1973	1.97 m (6 ft 6 in)	86 kg (190 lb)	350 cm (140 in)	315 cm (124 in)	(Tunisia) E.S. Sahel
14	Bilel Ben Hassine	22 June 1983	1.95 m (6 ft 5 in)	88 kg (194 lb)	330 cm (130 in)	315 cm (124 in)	(Tunisia) CS Sfaxien
15	Mehdi Ben Cheikh	13 May 1979	1.83 m (6 ft 0 in)	74 kg (163 lb)	318 cm (125 in)	302 cm (119 in)	(Tunisia) E.S. Tunis
16	Hichem Kaabi	13 September 1986	1.94 m (6 ft 4 in)	82 kg (181 lb)	340 cm (130 in)	315 cm (124 in)	(Tunisia) E.S. Tunis
18	Hakim Zouari	28 March 1988	1.97 m (6 ft 6 in)	95 kg (209 lb)	335 cm (132 in)	320 cm (130 in)	(Tunisia) CS Sfaxien

Group play

Pos	Team	Pld	W	L	Pts	SW	SL	SR	SPW	SPL	SPR
1	United States	5	4	1	13	14	4	3.500	427	370	1.154
2	Brazil	5	4	1	11	13	5	2.600	418	379	1.103
3	Russia	5	4	1	11	12	5	2.400	408	352	1.159
4	Germany	5	2	3	5	6	11	0.545	379	388	0.977
5	Serbia	5	1	4	5	7	13	0.538	413	455	0.908
6	Tunisia	5	0	5	0	1	15	0.067	294	395	0.744

29 July 2012; 22:20	Brazil	3–0	Tunisia	Earls Court Exhibition Centre, London; Attendance: 10,000; Referees: Ibrahim Al-Naama (QAT), Brian McDougall (GBR)
29 July 2012; 22:20	(25–17, 25–21, 25–18); Results Statistics			Earls Court Exhibition Centre, London; Attendance: 10,000; Referees: Ibrahim Al-Naama (QAT), Brian McDougall (GBR)

31 July 2012; 09:30	Serbia	3–1	Tunisia	Earls Court Exhibition Centre, London; Attendance: 10,500; Referees: Denny Cespedes (DOM), Jose Velez (PUR)
31 July 2012; 09:30	(25–15, 25–21, 20–25, 25–18); Results Statistics			Earls Court Exhibition Centre, London; Attendance: 10,500; Referees: Denny Cespedes (DOM), Jose Velez (PUR)

2 August 2012; 14:45	Russia	3–0	Tunisia	Earls Court Exhibition Centre, London; Attendance: 13,000; Referees: Akihiko Tano (JPN), Mitchell Davidson (CAN)
2 August 2012; 14:45	(25–21, 25–15, 25–23); Results Statistics			Earls Court Exhibition Centre, London; Attendance: 13,000; Referees: Akihiko Tano (JPN), Mitchell Davidson (CAN)

4 August 2012; 09:30	Germany	3–0	Tunisia	Earls Court Exhibition Centre, London; Attendance: 11,000; Referees: Brian McDougall (GBR), Denny Cespedes (DOM)
4 August 2012; 09:30	(25–15, 25–16, 25–16); Results Statistics			Earls Court Exhibition Centre, London; Attendance: 11,000; Referees: Brian McDougall (GBR), Denny Cespedes (DOM)

6 August 2012; 20:00	United States	3–0	Tunisia	Earls Court Exhibition Centre, London; Attendance: 11,000; Referees: Georgios Karampetsos (GRE), Mitchell Davidson (CAN)
6 August 2012; 20:00	(25–15, 25–19, 25–19); Results Statistics			Earls Court Exhibition Centre, London; Attendance: 11,000; Referees: Georgios Karampetsos (GRE), Mitchell Davidson (CAN)

== Weightlifting ==
Tunisia has qualified 1 man and 1 woman.

Athlete	Event	Snatch		Clean & Jerk		Total	Rank
Athlete	Event	Result	Rank	Result	Rank	Total	Rank
Khalil El Maoui	Men's −56 kg	132	2	—	—	132	DNF
Ghada Hassine	Women's −69 kg	102	11	120	10	222	10

== Wrestling ==
Tunisia has qualified 8 quota places.

Key:

- VT – Victory by Fall.
- PP – Decision by Points – the loser with technical points.
- PO – Decision by Points – the loser without technical points.

Men's freestyle

Athlete	Event	Qualification	Round of 16	Quarterfinal	Semifinal	Repechage 1	Repechage 2	Final / BM	
Athlete	Event	Opposition Result	Opposition Result	Opposition Result	Opposition Result	Opposition Result	Opposition Result	Opposition Result	Rank
Haithem Ben Alayech	−66 kg	Garcia (CAN); L 0–5 ^{VF}	Did not advance						18
Bilel Ouechtati	−74 kg	Bye	Shapiyev (KAZ); L 1–3 ^{PP}	Did not advance					11

Men's Greco-Roman

Athlete	Event	Qualification	Round of 16	Quarterfinal	Semifinal	Repechage 1	Repechage 2	Final / BM	
Athlete	Event	Opposition Result	Opposition Result	Opposition Result	Opposition Result	Opposition Result	Opposition Result	Opposition Result	Rank
Zied Ayet Ikram	−74 kg	Bye	Guénot (FRA); L 0–3 ^{PO}	Did not advance					17
Haykel Achouri	−84 kg	Bye	Rachyba (UKR); L 0–3 ^{PO}	Did not advance					15
Hassine Ayari	−96 kg	Bye	Atafi (MAR); W 3–1 ^{PP}	Estrada (CUB); L 0–3 ^{PO}	Did not advance				9
Radhouane Chebbi	−120 kg	Bye	Banak (POL); L 0–3 ^{PO}	Did not advance					15

Women's freestyle

Athlete	Event	Qualification	Round of 16	Quarterfinal	Semifinal	Repechage 1	Repechage 2	Final / BM	
Athlete	Event	Opposition Result	Opposition Result	Opposition Result	Opposition Result	Opposition Result	Opposition Result	Opposition Result	Rank
Maroi Mezien	−48 kg	Bye	Obara (JPN); L 0–5 ^{VT}	Did not advance		Bye	Sambou (SEN); L 0–5 ^{VT}	Did not advance	14
Marwa Amri	−55 kg	Um J-E (KOR); W 5–0 ^{VT}	Mattsson (SWE); L 0–3 ^{PO}	Did not advance					8
