= Soloniaina =

Soloniaina is a Madagascan surname. Notable people with this surname include:

- Jean de Dieu Soloniaina (born 1974), Madagascan boxer
- Josiane Soloniaina (born 1978), Madagascan wrestler
