= 2002 World Wrestling Championships – Women's freestyle 55 kg =

55kg Category of the 2002 Women's World Wrestling Championship

Women's freestyle 55 kg at the 2002 World Championships
- Venue: Tasos Kampouris Hall
- Dates: 2–3 November 2002
- Competitors: 23 from 23 nations

Medalists
gold medal	Saori Yoshida	Japan
silver medal	Tina George	United States
bronze medal	Ida-Theres Karlsson	Sweden

The women's freestyle 55 kilograms is a competition featured at the 2002 World Wrestling Championships, and was held at the Tasos Kampouris Hall in Chalcis, Greece from 2 to 3 November 2002.

== Results ==
Legend

- F — Won by fall

=== Preliminary round ===
==== Pool 1 ====
Pos	Athlete	Pld	W	L	CP	TP	SWE	TUR	KAZ
1	Ida-Theres Karlsson (SWE)	2	2	0	6	7	—	4–0	3–0
2	Zeynep Yıldırım (TUR)	2	1	1	3	3	0–3 PO	—	3–0
3	Zhanna Kaikenova (KAZ)	2	0	2	0	0	0–3 PO	0–3 PO	—

Source: Japan Wrestling

==== Pool 2 ====
Pos	Athlete	Pld	W	L	CP	TP	HUN	GER	KOR
1	Kitti Godó (HUN)	2	1	1	4	12	—	11–7	1–4
2	Sabrina Lotz (GER)	2	1	1	4	10	1–3 PP	—	3–0
3	Kim Hee-jeong (KOR)	2	1	1	3	4	3–1 PP	0–3 PO	—

Source: Japan Wrestling

==== Pool 3 ====
Pos	Athlete	Pld	W	L	CP	TP	CAN	ITA	BUL
1	Jennifer Ryz (CAN)	2	2	0	8	14	—	10–0	4–0 Fall
2	Eva Sacchi (ITA)	2	1	1	4	10	0–4 ST	—	10–0
3	Valentina Veleva (BUL)	2	0	2	0	0	0–4 TO	0–4 ST	—

Source: Japan Wrestling

==== Pool 4 ====
Pos	Athlete	Pld	W	L	CP	TP	JPN	UKR	ESP
1	Saori Yoshida (JPN)	2	2	0	7	13	—	3–0 Fall	10–1
2	Tetyana Lazareva (UKR)	2	1	1	4	6	0–4 TO	—	6–0 Fall
3	Minerva Montero (ESP)	2	0	2	1	1	1–3 PP	0–4 TO	—

Source: Japan Wrestling

==== Pool 5 ====
Pos	Athlete	Pld	W	L	CP	TP	POL	VEN	AUT
1	Monika Michalik (POL)	2	2	0	7	7	—	3–1	4–0 Fall
2	Marcia Andrades (VEN)	2	1	1	4	13	1–3 PP	—	12–4
3	Birgit Stern (AUT)	2	0	2	1	4	0–4 TO	1–3 PP	—

Source: Japan Wrestling

==== Pool 6 ====
Pos	Athlete	Pld	W	L	CP	TP	USA	SUI	FRA	MAD
1	Tina George (USA)	3	3	0	11	33	—	15–4	8–2	10–0
2	Nadine Tokar (SUI)	3	2	1	9	10	1–4 SP	—	3–5 Fall	3–2 Fall
3	Vanessa Boubryemm (FRA)	3	1	2	4	14	1–3 PP	0–4 TO	—	7–3
4	Josiane Soloniaina (MAD)	3	0	3	1	5	0–4 ST	0–4 TO	1–3 PP	—

Source: Japan Wrestling

==== Pool 7 ====
Pos	Athlete	Pld	W	L	CP	TP	GRE	RUS	SEN	AUS
1	Konstantina Tsimpanakou (GRE)	3	3	0	10	23	—	6–5	5–1	12–0
2	Viktoria Zagainova (RUS)	3	2	1	9	13	1–3 PP	—	5–0 Fall	3–0 Fall
3	Isabelle Sambou (SEN)	3	1	2	5	11	1–3 PP	0–4 TO	—	10–0
4	Suellyn Hayes (AUS)	3	0	3	0	0	0–4 ST	0–4 TO	0–4 ST	—

Source: Japan Wrestling

=== Knockout round ===
Quarterfinals
Ida-Theres Karlsson (SWE)	6
Kitti Godó (HUN)	0
Jennifer Ryz (CAN)	0
Saori Yoshida (JPN)	11
Monika Michalik (POL)	0
Tina George (USA)	3

Semifinals
Ida-Theres Karlsson (SWE)	0
Saori Yoshida (JPN)	10
Tina George (USA)	8^{F}
Konstantina Tsimpanakou (GRE)	1

Final
Saori Yoshida (JPN)	10
Tina George (USA)	4
Bronze medal match
Ida-Theres Karlsson (SWE)	7
Konstantina Tsimpanakou (GRE)	1
