= 2012 European Wrestling Olympic Qualification Tournament =

The 2012 Olympic Wrestling European Qualification Tournament was the fourth regional qualifying tournament for the 2012 Olympics and it was held in Sofia, Bulgaria from 20 to 22 April 2012.

The top two wrestlers in each weight class earn a qualification spot for their nation.

== Men's freestyle ==
=== 55 kg ===
20 April

Round of 16
Robert Rogalewicz (POL)	1	1	3
Vitali Hurskyi (UKR)	7	1	3
Róbert Molnár (HUN)	0	0
Ahmet Peker (TUR)	3	6
Alexandru Chirtoacă (MDA)	0
Andrei Dukov (ROU)	3^{F}
Uladzislau Andreyeu (BLR)	0	0
Makhmud Magomedov (AZE)	1	2

Quarterfinals
Marcel Ewald (GER)	1	2
Urs Wild (SUI)	0	1
Francisco Sánchez (ESP)	0	1
Vladimer Khinchegashvili (GEO)	2	3
Vitali Hurskyi (UKR)	0	0
Ahmet Peker (TUR)	3	6
Andrei Dukov (ROU)	3	5
Makhmud Magomedov (AZE)	0	4

Semifinals
Marcel Ewald (GER)	0	0
Vladimer Khinchegashvili (GEO)	7	3
Ahmet Peker (TUR)	0	1	3
Andrei Dukov (ROU)	1	0	0

Final
Vladimer Khinchegashvili (GEO)	2	1
Ahmet Peker (TUR)	0	0

Repechage round 1
Róbert Molnár (HUN)	0	1
Vitali Hurskyi (UKR)	1	8

Bronze medals
Francisco Sánchez (ESP)	W	O
Marcel Ewald (GER)
Vitali Hurskyi (UKR)	4	0	1
Andrei Dukov (ROU)	3	2	2

=== 60 kg ===
20 April

Round of 16
Valentin Popescu (ROU)	3	0
Selahattin Kılıçsallayan (TUR)	5	2
Mykola Bolotňuk (SVK)	0	0
Andrei Prepeliţă (MDA)	2	1
Vasyl Fedoryshyn (UKR)	6	6
Adam Blok (POL)	0	0
Toghrul Asgarov (AZE)	1	4
Aleksandr Kontoev (BLR)	1	0
Tim Schleicher (GER)	1	5^{F}
Oleksandr Madyarchyk (GBR)	1	0

Quarterfinals
József Molnár (HUN)	0	0
Anatolie Guidea (BUL)	3	4
Narek Sanoyan (ARM)	3	0
Selahattin Kılıçsallayan (TUR)	4	4
Andrei Prepeliţă (MDA)	0	0
Vasyl Fedoryshyn (UKR)	1	1
Toghrul Asgarov (AZE)	4	2
Tim Schleicher (GER)	0	1

Semifinals
Anatolie Guidea (BUL)	1	1
Selahattin Kılıçsallayan (TUR)	0	0
Vasyl Fedoryshyn (UKR)	0	1
Toghrul Asgarov (AZE)	2	4

Final
Anatolie Guidea (BUL)	0	1
Toghrul Asgarov (AZE)	3	1

Repechage round 1
Aleksandr Kontoev (BLR)	1	3
Tim Schleicher (GER)	0	0

Bronze medals
József Molnár (HUN)	3	4	0
Selahattin Kılıçsallayan (TUR)	8	3	3^{F}
Aleksandr Kontoev (BLR)	0	0
Vasyl Fedoryshyn (UKR)	1	2

=== 66 kg ===
20 April

Round of 32
Stelios Mama (CYP)	0–2 (0–3, 0–8)	Martin Daum (GER)
Zurabi Iakobishvili (GEO)	2–1 (1–2, 2–1, 5–3)	Andriy Stadnik (UKR)
Gergõ Wöller (HUN)	1–2 (1–0, 1–2, 0–1)	Andreas Triantafyllidis (GRE)

Round of 16
Dejan Mitrov (MKD)	4	2^{F}
Raimondo Campagna (ITA)	1	0
Mustafa Kaya (TUR)	3	4	2
Adam Sobieraj (POL)	3	0	2
Igor Gertner (ISR)	0	1
Ali Shabanau (BLR)	6	2
Philip Roberts (GBR)	1	2	0
Jouni Rosenlöf (FIN)	1	3	1
Steven Graf (SUI)	0	0
David Safaryan (ARM)	1	3
Yan Ceaban (ROU)	3	1
Vladimir Gotişan (MDA)	0	0
Vilson Ndregjoni (ALB)	0	1
Martin Daum (GER)	1	2
Zurabi Iakobishvili (GEO)	2	2
Andreas Triantafyllidis (GRE)	0	0

Quarterfinals
Dejan Mitrov (MKD)	4	3^{F}
Adam Sobieraj (POL)	1	0
Ali Shabanau (BLR)	3	1
Jouni Rosenlöf (FIN)	0	0
David Safaryan (ARM)	0	1	3
Yan Ceaban (ROU)	1	0	0
Martin Daum (GER)	1	2
Zurabi Iakobishvili (GEO)	0	1

Semifinals
Dejan Mitrov (MKD)	1	0
Ali Shabanau (BLR)	2	1
David Safaryan (ARM)	1	3
Martin Daum (GER)	0	2

Final
Ali Shabanau (BLR)	1	2
David Safaryan (ARM)	0	0

Repechage round 2
Igor Gertner (ISR)	0^{R}
Jouni Rosenlöf (FIN)	1
Steven Graf (SUI)	0	0
Yan Ceaban (ROU)	1	2

Bronze medals
Jouni Rosenlöf (FIN)	2	2	0
Dejan Mitrov (MKD)	4	1	1
Yan Ceaban (ROU)	1	0	1
Martin Daum (GER)	0	1	0

=== 74 kg ===
20 April

Round of 16
Adam Saitiev (RUS)	1	2
Oleh Bilotserkivskyi (UKR)	0	1
Murad Gaidarov (BLR)	3	2
Lulzim Vrenezi (MKD)	1	0
Andriy Shyyka (GER)	1	2
Olegk Motsalin (GRE)	0	2
Kiril Terziev (BUL)	1	1
Marius Atofani (ROU)	0	0
Ayhan Sucu (TUR)	0	1	2
Roman Dermenji (MDA)	1	0	5^{F}

Quarterfinals
Gábor Hatos (HUN)	4	3
Tomasz Rogisz (POL)	0	0
Suren Markosyan (ARM)	1	2
Adam Saitiev (RUS)	3	4^{F}
Murad Gaidarov (BLR)	3	1
Andriy Shyyka (GER)	1	0
Kiril Terziev (BUL)	1	4^{F}
Roman Dermenji (MDA)	0	0

Semifinals
Gábor Hatos (HUN)	1	0
Adam Saitiev (RUS)	2	2
Murad Gaidarov (BLR)	1	2	0
Kiril Terziev (BUL)	0	3	3

Final
Adam Saitiev (RUS)	4	4
Kiril Terziev (BUL)	1	0

Repechage round 1
Oleh Bilotserkivskyi (UKR)	W	O
Suren Markosyan (ARM)
Marius Atofani (ROU)	0
Roman Dermenji (MDA)	3^{F}

Bronze medals
Oleh Bilotserkivskyi (UKR)	0	0
Gábor Hatos (HUN)	2	4
Roman Dermenji (MDA)	W	O
Murad Gaidarov (BLR)

=== 84 kg ===
20 April

Round of 16
Boris Andonov (ESP)	0	0
Piotr Ianulov (MDA)	1	3
Egzon Shala (ALB)	4	7	1
Gadzhimurad Nurmagomedov (ARM)	9	9	3
Marco Riesen (SUI)	6	3^{F}
Nate Ackerman (GBR)	0	0
Mihail Ganev (BUL)	1	1
Anthony Fasugba (ITA)	0	0
Alex Dolly (IRL)	2	1
Emzarios Bentinidis (GRE)	4	4
Maciej Balawender (POL)	0	2
İbrahim Bölükbaşı (TUR)	1	3
Edgaras Voitechovskis (LTU)	6	4
Gabriel Seregelyi (GER)	4	1
Gheorghiță Ștefan (ROU)	0	1	3
Amarhajy Mahamedau (BLR)	1	0	2

Quarterfinals
Piotr Ianulov (MDA)	1	1	0
Gadzhimurad Nurmagomedov (ARM)	0	3	1
Marco Riesen (SUI)	1	4
Mihail Ganev (BUL)	0	3
Emzarios Bentinidis (GRE)	0	0
İbrahim Bölükbaşı (TUR)	1	1
Edgaras Voitechovskis (LTU)	1	2
Gheorghiță Ștefan (ROU)	2	4

Semifinals
Gadzhimurad Nurmagomedov (ARM)	1	2	6
Marco Riesen (SUI)	0	3	3
İbrahim Bölükbaşı (TUR)	4	1
Gheorghiță Ștefan (ROU)	2	0

Final
Gadzhimurad Nurmagomedov (ARM)	1	2
İbrahim Bölükbaşı (TUR)	0	0

Repechage round 1
Egzon Shala (ALB)	W	O
Piotr Ianulov (MDA)
Maciej Balawender (POL)	1
Emzarios Bentinidis (GRE)	0^{R}

Bronze medals
Egzon Shala (ALB)	W	O
Marco Riesen (SUI)
Maciej Balawender (POL)	W	O
Gheorghiță Ștefan (ROU)

=== 96 kg ===
20 April

Round of 16
Aslanbek Alborov (AZE)	0	1
Georgi Sredkov (BUL)	1	1
Adrian Recorean (ROU)	0	0
Alen Zaseyev (UKR)	2	2
Leon Rattigan (GBR)	0	0
Abdusalam Gadisov (RUS)	3	2
Giorgi Gogshelidze (GEO)	1	1
Nicolae Ceban (MDA)	0	0
Grigorios Kriaridis (GRE)	0	0
Gergely Kiss (HUN)	1	8^{F}
Robin Ferdinand (GER)	7	4^{F}
Vartan Aparian (CYP)	0	0
Vratislav Chotaš (CZE)	5	1
Edgar Yenokyan (ARM)	7	3

Quarterfinals
Kamil Skaskiewicz (POL)	1	0	3
Georgi Sredkov (BUL)	0	1	1
Alen Zaseyev (UKR)	0	0
Abdusalam Gadisov (RUS)	1	1
Giorgi Gogshelidze (GEO)	4^{F}
Gergely Kiss (HUN)	0
Robin Ferdinand (GER)	0	3^{F}
Edgar Yenokyan (ARM)	1	5

Semifinals
Kamil Skaskiewicz (POL)	0	0
Abdusalam Gadisov (RUS)	4	4
Giorgi Gogshelidze (GEO)	6	2
Robin Ferdinand (GER)	0	0

Final
Abdusalam Gadisov (RUS)	1
Giorgi Gogshelidze (GEO)	0^{R}

Repechage round 1
Leon Rattigan (GBR)	0	0
Alen Zaseyev (UKR)	1	1
Nicolae Ceban (MDA)	4	4
Gergely Kiss (HUN)	0	2

Bronze medals
Alen Zaseyev (UKR)	1	6
Kamil Skaskiewicz (POL)	0	0
Nicolae Ceban (MDA)	3^{F}
Robin Ferdinand (GER)	0

=== 120 kg ===
21 April

Round of 16
Ioannis Arzoumanidis (GRE)	0	2	2
Fatjon Baro (ALB)	2	0	1
Dániel Ligeti (HUN)	2	1
Bartłomiej Bartnicki (POL)	0	0
Oleksandr Khotsianivskyi (UKR)	1	2
Bozhidar Boyadzhiev (BUL)	0	1
José Cuba (ESP)	1	0
Nick Matuhin (GER)	4	7

Quarterfinals
Ruslan Basiev (ARM)	0	0
Taha Akgül (TUR)	3	2
Gheorghe Susumcov (MDA)	0	0
Rareș Chintoan (ROU)	3	4
Ioannis Arzoumanidis (GRE)	0	0
Dániel Ligeti (HUN)	3	1
Oleksandr Khotsianivskyi (UKR)	4	6
Nick Matuhin (GER)	0	0

Semifinals
Taha Akgül (TUR)	4	3
Rareș Chintoan (ROU)	0	1
Dániel Ligeti (HUN)	3	4
Oleksandr Khotsianivskyi (UKR)	1	0

Final
Taha Akgül (TUR)
Dániel Ligeti (HUN)	W	O

Repechage round 1
Bartłomiej Bartnicki (POL)	W	O
Ioannis Arzoumanidis (GRE)

Bronze medals
Ruslan Basiev (ARM)	0	1	0
Rareș Chintoan (ROU)	1	0	1
Bartłomiej Bartnicki (POL)	4^{F}
Oleksandr Khotsianivskyi (UKR)	1

== Men's Greco-Roman ==
=== 55 kg ===
21 April

Round of 16
Roman Amoyan (ARM)	4	3
Mariusz Łoś (POL)	0	0
Aleksandar Kostadinov (BUL)	2	1
Virgil Munteanu (ROU)	0	0
Goderdzi Davitadze (GEO)	1	0
Jani Haapamäki (FIN)	1	2
Fatih Üçüncü (TUR)	2	0	0
Vugar Rahimov (UKR)	0	1	3

Quarterfinals
Anar Zeinalov (EST)	0	1	0
Håkan Nyblom (DEN)	1	0	1
Dustin Scherf (GER)	0	0
Anders Rønningen (NOR)	5	1
Roman Amoyan (ARM)	1	0	0
Aleksandar Kostadinov (BUL)	0	7	2
Jani Haapamäki (FIN)	3	1	2
Vugar Rahimov (UKR)	0	1	0

Semifinals
Håkan Nyblom (DEN)	1	1
Anders Rønningen (NOR)	0	0
Aleksandar Kostadinov (BUL)	1	2
Jani Haapamäki (FIN)	0	0

Final
Håkan Nyblom (DEN)	1	4
Aleksandar Kostadinov (BUL)	0	0

Repechage round 1
Virgil Munteanu (ROU)	0	0
Roman Amoyan (ARM)	1	1

Bronze medals
Anar Zeinalov (EST)	5	0	3
Anders Rønningen (NOR)	0	1	0
Roman Amoyan (ARM)	3^{F}
Jani Haapamäki (FIN)	0

=== 60 kg ===
21 April

Round of 32
Anders Ekstrøm (DEN)	1–2 (0–2, 1–0, 0–3)	Aurelian Leciu (ROU)
Jens Rung (GER)	0–2 (0–1, 0–2)	Kostyantyn Balitskyi (UKR)

Round of 16
Soner Sucu (TUR)	1	0	0
Stig-André Berge (NOR)	0	3	2
Dzmitry Alenski (BLR)	0	0
Kamran Mammadov (AZE)	1	2
Paolo Fucile (ITA)	0	1
Aleksan Mikayelyan (ARM)	6	8
István Kozak (HUN)	1	1
István Lévai (SVK)	0	0
Matti Kettunen (FIN)	2	0	2
Donior Islamov (MDA)	0	2	0
Phiruz Tsulukidze (GEO)	0	1	1
Patrick Stadelmann (SUI)	1	0	1
Vladimiros Matias (GRE)	1	3
Dawid Kareciński (POL)	0	0
Aurelian Leciu (ROU)	1	2
Kostyantyn Balitskyi (UKR)	0	0

Quarterfinals
Stig-André Berge (NOR)	0	0
Kamran Mammadov (AZE)	2	2
Aleksan Mikayelyan (ARM)	0	0
István Kozak (HUN)	1	2
Matti Kettunen (FIN)	2	0	3
Phiruz Tsulukidze (GEO)	1	1	0
Vladimiros Matias (GRE)	2	1	1
Aurelian Leciu (ROU)	0	2	0

Semifinals
Kamran Mammadov (AZE)	1	2
István Kozak (HUN)	0	0
Matti Kettunen (FIN)	2	2
Vladimiros Matias (GRE)	0	0

Final
Kamran Mammadov (AZE)	2	1
Matti Kettunen (FIN)	0	0

Repechage round 2
Dzmitry Alenski (BLR)	4^{F}
Stig-André Berge (NOR)	0
Donior Islamov (MDA)	1	9	0
Phiruz Tsulukidze (GEO)	1	5	6

Bronze medals
Dzmitry Alenski (BLR)	0	3	0
István Kozak (HUN)	1	0	1
Phiruz Tsulukidze (GEO)	3	2
Vladimiros Matias (GRE)	1	1

=== 66 kg ===
21 April

Round of 32
Tamás Lőrincz (HUN)	1–2 (0–2, 1–1, 0–2)	Vitaliy Rahimov (AZE)
Pascal Strebel (SUI)	1–2 (0–1, 1–0, 0–1)	Tudor Gaivan (MDA)
Georgian Carpen (ROU)	1–2 (3–0, 0–1, 0–3)	Ambako Vachadze (RUS)
Aleksandar Maksimović (SRB)	2–0 (1–0, 1–0)	Tomasz Świerk (POL)
Sasun Ghambaryan (ARM)	2–1 (0–1, 1–0, 2–0)	Danijel Janečić (CRO)

Round of 16
Richard Rigó (SVK)	0	0
Juha Hiltunen (FIN)	1	1
Atakan Yüksel (TUR)	0	0
Denys Demyankov (UKR)	1	4
Edgaras Venckaitis (LTU)	3	1
Riccardo Magni (ITA)	0	0
Gievgkeni Pentorets (GRE)	0	0
Emiliyan Todorov (BUL)	1	3
Hugo Passos (POR)	1
Mikhail Siamionau (BLR)	2^{F}
Steeve Guénot (FRA)	1	1
Vitaliy Rahimov (AZE)	0	0
Tudor Gaivan (MDA)	0	0
Ambako Vachadze (RUS)	1	2
Aleksandar Maksimović (SRB)	2	0	0
Sasun Ghambaryan (ARM)	0	3	5

Quarterfinals
Juha Hiltunen (FIN)	3	0	1
Denys Demyankov (UKR)	1	3	0
Edgaras Venckaitis (LTU)	0	1	2
Emiliyan Todorov (BUL)	1	0	1
Mikhail Siamionau (BLR)	3	0	0
Steeve Guénot (FRA)	1	2	4
Ambako Vachadze (RUS)	3	0	0
Sasun Ghambaryan (ARM)	0	2	3

Semifinals
Juha Hiltunen (FIN)	0
Edgaras Venckaitis (LTU)	4^{F}
Steeve Guénot (FRA)	2	1	1
Sasun Ghambaryan (ARM)	1	2	0

Final
Edgaras Venckaitis (LTU)	2	0	0
Steeve Guénot (FRA)	0	3	2

Repechage round 2
Riccardo Magni (ITA)	0	0
Emiliyan Todorov (BUL)	1	1
Vitaliy Rahimov (AZE)	2	1
Mikhail Siamionau (BLR)	0	0

Bronze medals
Emiliyan Todorov (BUL)	3	1
Juha Hiltunen (FIN)	0	0
Vitaliy Rahimov (AZE)	1	2
Sasun Ghambaryan (ARM)	0	0

=== 74 kg ===
21 April

Round of 32
Rafig Huseynov (AZE)	0–2 (1–1, 0–1)	Péter Bácsi (HUN)
Veli-Karri Suominen (FIN)	0–2 (0–7, 0–5)	Ionel Puşcaşu (ROU)
Valdemaras Venckaitis (LTU)	2–0 (1–0, 1–0)	Jure Kuhar (SLO)
Dmytro Pyshkov (UKR)	1–2 (0–1, 1–0, 0–2)	Timo Badusch (GER)
Savvas Apostolou (GRE)	0–2 (0–1, 0–3)	Aleksandrs Višņakovs (LAT)

Round of 16
Ilian Georgiev (BUL)	2	1
Christophe Guénot (FRA)	0	0
Jonas Bossert (SUI)	1	1	1
Meraldo Ndoka (ALB)	3	0	0
Yauhen Bachko (BLR)	0	0
Mark Madsen (DEN)	1	2
Jakub Tim (POL)	0	1	0
Florian Marchl (AUT)	1	0	2
Igor Beşleaga (MDA)	0	0
Tomáš Sobecký (CZE)	1	3
Zurabi Datunashvili (GEO)	4	1
Péter Bácsi (HUN)	3	0
Ionel Puşcaşu (ROU)	0	6	3
Valdemaras Venckaitis (LTU)	3	0	0
Timo Badusch (GER)	0	1	2
Aleksandrs Višņakovs (LAT)	1	0	0

Quarterfinals
Ilian Georgiev (BUL)	7	1	3
Jonas Bossert (SUI)	4	5	0
Mark Madsen (DEN)	1	2
Florian Marchl (AUT)	0	0
Tomáš Sobecký (CZE)	0	0
Zurabi Datunashvili (GEO)	1	2
Ionel Puşcaşu (ROU)	6^{F}
Timo Badusch (GER)	0

Semifinals
Ilian Georgiev (BUL)	0	0
Mark Madsen (DEN)	2	3
Zurabi Datunashvili (GEO)	2	2
Ionel Puşcaşu (ROU)	0	0

Final
Mark Madsen (DEN)	0	0
Zurabi Datunashvili (GEO)	1	4

Repechage round 2
Yauhen Bachko (BLR)	W	O
Florian Marchl (AUT)
Péter Bácsi (HUN)	3	3
Tomáš Sobecký (CZE)	2	0

Bronze medals
Yauhen Bachko (BLR)	0	0
Ilian Georgiev (BUL)	1	2
Péter Bácsi (HUN)	2	1
Ionel Puşcaşu (ROU)	0	0

=== 84 kg ===
21 April

Round of 32
Hristo Marinov (BUL)	2–1 (0–1, 1–0, 1–0)	Marián Mihálik (SVK)
Andrea Minguzzi (ITA)	0–2 (1–2, 0–2)	Ergys Mirukaj (ALB)
Artur Omarov (CZE)	Fall (0–4)	Vasyl Rachyba (UKR)
Laimutis Adomaitis (LTU)	1–2 (1–0, 0–1, 0–1)	Nenad Žugaj (CRO)

Round of 16
Amer Hrustanović (AUT)	4	2
Hrach Hovhannisyan (ARM)	0	1
Ramsin Azizsir (GER)	2^{F}
Petar Balo (SRB)	0
Thomas Suppiger (SUI)	0	0
Viktor Lőrincz (HUN)	1	3
Serghei Zgherea (MDA)	2	0	0
Theodoros Tounousidis (GRE)	0	2	1
Revaz Nadareishvili (GEO)	3	0	0
Mélonin Noumonvi (FRA)	0	2	2
Ara Abrahamian (SWE)	1	2
Alo Toom (EST)	0	0
Hristo Marinov (BUL)	3	1	7
Ergys Mirukaj (ALB)	0	2	0
Vasyl Rachyba (UKR)	3	1
Nenad Žugaj (CRO)	0	0

Quarterfinals
Amer Hrustanović (AUT)	3	1
Ramsin Azizsir (GER)	0	0
Viktor Lőrincz (HUN)	0	0
Theodoros Tounousidis (GRE)	1	1
Mélonin Noumonvi (FRA)	0	1	0
Ara Abrahamian (SWE)	2	0	1
Hristo Marinov (BUL)	0	1
Vasyl Rachyba (UKR)	1	2

Semifinals
Amer Hrustanović (AUT)	1	1
Theodoros Tounousidis (GRE)	0	0
Ara Abrahamian (SWE)	3	0	0
Vasyl Rachyba (UKR)	0	2	2

Final
Amer Hrustanović (AUT)	3	0	0
Vasyl Rachyba (UKR)	0	1	1

Repechage round 1
Artur Omarov (CZE)	0	2
Nenad Žugaj (CRO)	1	4

Repechage round 2
Hrach Hovhannisyan (ARM)	2	1
Ramsin Azizsir (GER)	0	0
Nenad Žugaj (CRO)	0	1	0
Hristo Marinov (BUL)	1	1	1

Bronze medals
Hrach Hovhannisyan (ARM)	0	1
Theodoros Tounousidis (GRE)	2	1
Hristo Marinov (BUL)	0	0
Ara Abrahamian (SWE)	1	1

=== 96 kg ===
22 April

Round of 32
Marthin Hamlet Nielsen (NOR)	2–0 (1–0, 1–0)	Balázs Kiss (HUN)
Filip Köszeghy (SVK)	0–2 (0–3, 0–1)	Artur Aleksanyan (ARM)

Round of 16
Sandro Dikhaminjia (GEO)	1	3
Marcin Olejniczak (POL)	0	1
Marin Cazac (MDA)	0	0
Georgios Koutsioumpas (GRE)	1	1
Dejan Franjković (SRB)	1	2	0
Dimitriy Timchenko (UKR)	1	0	1
Ardo Arusaar (EST)	2	1
David Vála (CZE)	0	0
Shalva Gadabadze (AZE)	7	4
Nikola Knežević (MNE)	0	0
Daigoro Timoncini (ITA)	1	3
Oliver Hassler (GER)	0	0
Vilius Laurinaitis (LTU)	2	4
Robert Papp (ROU)	0	0
Marthin Hamlet Nielsen (NOR)	0	0
Artur Aleksanyan (ARM)	1	2

Quarterfinals
Sandro Dikhaminjia (GEO)	1	0
Georgios Koutsioumpas (GRE)	5	3
Dimitriy Timchenko (UKR)	0	1	0
Ardo Arusaar (EST)	1	0	1
Shalva Gadabadze (AZE)	1	1	2
Daigoro Timoncini (ITA)	1	0	0
Vilius Laurinaitis (LTU)	0	0
Artur Aleksanyan (ARM)	2	6

Semifinals
Georgios Koutsioumpas (GRE)	0	2
Ardo Arusaar (EST)	2	2
Shalva Gadabadze (AZE)	0	0
Artur Aleksanyan (ARM)	1	2

Final
Ardo Arusaar (EST)	0	0
Artur Aleksanyan (ARM)	2	1

Repechage round 1
Filip Köszeghy (SVK)	W	O
Marthin Hamlet Nielsen (NOR)

Repechage round 2
David Vála (CZE)	0	0
Dimitriy Timchenko (UKR)	1	2
Filip Köszeghy (SVK)	2	0
Vilius Laurinaitis (LTU)	3	3

Bronze medals
Dimitriy Timchenko (UKR)	W	O
Georgios Koutsioumpas (GRE)
Vilius Laurinaitis (LTU)	0	0
Shalva Gadabadze (AZE)	1	2

=== 120 kg ===
22 April

Round of 16
Sergo Gogisvanidze (GEO)	2	1
Rocco Daniele Ficara (ITA)	0	0
Yannick Szczepaniak (FRA)	0	0
Khasan Baroev (RUS)	2	2
Xenofon Koutsioumpas (GRE)	0	0
Yury Patrikeyev (ARM)	1	2
Ivan Ivanov (BUL)	2	0	2
Heiki Nabi (EST)	0	2	1
Ioseb Chugoshvili (BLR)	0	0
Yevhen Orlov (UKR)	1	3^{F}
Maksim Prokhorov (AZE)	1	0
Ralf Böhringer (GER)	4	5
Nemanja Pavlović (SRB)	3	0
Marijus Grygelis (LTU)	3	2

Quarterfinals
Alin Alexuc-Ciurariu (ROU)	0	1	0
Sergo Gogisvanidze (GEO)	1	0	3
Khasan Baroev (RUS)	0	1	0
Yury Patrikeyev (ARM)	1	0	1
Ivan Ivanov (BUL)	4	0	0
Yevhen Orlov (UKR)	1	1	5
Ralf Böhringer (GER)	4^{F}
Marijus Grygelis (LTU)	0

Semifinals
Sergo Gogisvanidze (GEO)	0	0
Yury Patrikeyev (ARM)	1	1
Yevhen Orlov (UKR)	1	1	3^{F}
Ralf Böhringer (GER)	3	0	0

Final
Yury Patrikeyev (ARM)	2	1
Yevhen Orlov (UKR)	0	0

Repechage round 1
Xenofon Koutsioumpas (GRE)	W	O
Khasan Baroev (RUS)
Ioseb Chugoshvili (BLR)	2	1
Ivan Ivanov (BUL)	0	0

Bronze medals
Xenofon Koutsioumpas (GRE)	W	O
Sergo Gogisvanidze (GEO)
Ioseb Chugoshvili (BLR)	W	O
Ralf Böhringer (GER)

== Women's freestyle ==
=== 48 kg ===
22 April

Round of 16
Oleksandra Kohut (UKR)	0	1	0
Nadezhda Fedorova (RUS)	1	0	3
Silvia Felice (ITA)	0	0
Iwona Matkowska (POL)	4	2
Jessica Blaszka (NED)	1	0
Estera Dobre (ROU)	4	3
Lenka Matejová (SVK)	0	0
Mercédesz Dénes (HUN)	1	1
Alina Ryzhova (BLR)	1	0
Sümeyye Sezer (TUR)	6	4
Mélanie Lesaffre (FRA)	0	0
Sarianne Savola (FIN)	1	1
Henriette Slattum (NOR)	0	2	2
Elitsa Yankova (BUL)	1	0	0
Liliana Santos (POR)	0	0
Alexandra Engelhardt (GER)	6	3

Quarterfinals
Nadezhda Fedorova (RUS)	0	0
Iwona Matkowska (POL)	3	4
Estera Dobre (ROU)	2	1
Mercédesz Dénes (HUN)	0	0
Sümeyye Sezer (TUR)	0	0
Sarianne Savola (FIN)	1	3
Henriette Slattum (NOR)	0	0
Alexandra Engelhardt (GER)	6	2

Semifinals
Iwona Matkowska (POL)	4	5
Estera Dobre (ROU)	3	0
Sarianne Savola (FIN)	1
Alexandra Engelhardt (GER)	4^{F}

Final
Iwona Matkowska (POL)	4	4
Alexandra Engelhardt (GER)	0	2

Repechage round 1
Silvia Felice (ITA)	0	0
Nadezhda Fedorova (RUS)	3	1
Liliana Santos (POR)	3	1
Henriette Slattum (NOR)	0	0

Bronze medals
Nadezhda Fedorova (RUS)	W	O
Estera Dobre (ROU)
Liliana Santos (POR)	3	1
Sarianne Savola (FIN)	2	0

=== 55 kg ===
22 April

Round of 32
Christiane Knittel (GER)	0–2 (0–1, 0–3)	Anastasija Grigorjeva (LAT)

Round of 16
Minerva Montero (ESP)	0	0
Valentina Minguzzi (ITA)	1	1
Petra Olli (FIN)	1	2
Emese Barka (HUN)	0	0
Vânia Guerreiro (POR)	3	1
Bediha Gün (TUR)	7	2
Anna Gomis (FRA)	0	0
Yuliya Ratkevich (AZE)	1	4
Nadine Tokar (SUI)	0	0
Ana Maria Pavăl (ROU)	5	5
Ludmila Cristea (MDA)	1	4
Katarzyna Krawczyk (POL)	0	0
Maria Prevolaraki (GRE)	0	5^{F}
Nadzeya Shushko (BLR)	3	3
Lenka Martináková (CZE)	0	0
Anastasija Grigorjeva (LAT)	1	3^{F}

Quarterfinals
Valentina Minguzzi (ITA)	1	0	1
Petra Olli (FIN)	0	1	4
Bediha Gün (TUR)	0
Yuliya Ratkevich (AZE)	6^{F}
Ana Maria Pavăl (ROU)	2	0
Ludmila Cristea (MDA)	6	3^{F}
Maria Prevolaraki (GRE)	0	1	4
Anastasija Grigorjeva (LAT)	1	0	3

Semifinals
Petra Olli (FIN)	0
Yuliya Ratkevich (AZE)	6^{F}
Ludmila Cristea (MDA)	0	0
Maria Prevolaraki (GRE)	1	4

Final
Yuliya Ratkevich (AZE)	5	2	3
Maria Prevolaraki (GRE)	0	4	1

Repechage round 2
Anna Gomis (FRA)	1	1
Bediha Gün (TUR)	0	0
Nadzeya Shushko (BLR)	1	1
Anastasija Grigorjeva (LAT)	4	3

Bronze medals
Anna Gomis (FRA)	1	0	2
Petra Olli (FIN)	0	5	0
Anastasija Grigorjeva (LAT)	0	3
Ludmila Cristea (MDA)	1	4

=== 63 kg ===
22 April

Round of 32
Mirjana Martinović (MNE)	Fall (0–6)	Agoro Papavasileiou (GRE)
Maria Diana (ITA)	0–2 (0–1, 0–3)	Audrey Prieto (FRA)
Taybe Yusein (BUL)	2–0 (4–0, 7–0)	Sarah Connolly (GBR)

Round of 16
Beatrice Oancea (ROU)	1	2
Michala Spoustová (CZE)	1	5
Monika Michalik (POL)	0	0
Yuliya Ostapchuk (UKR)	1	1
Elif Jale Yeşilırmak (TUR)	1	1
María Teresa Méndez (ESP)	0	0
Johanna Kikkas (EST)	0	0
Stephanie Maierhofer (AUT)	1	3
Lubov Volosova (RUS)	1	2
Henna Johansson (SWE)	0	0
Irina Netreba (AZE)	1
Aline Focken (GER)	5^{F}
Hanna Savenia (BLR)	0	0
Agoro Papavasileiou (GRE)	1	2
Audrey Prieto (FRA)	1	1	3
Taybe Yusein (BUL)	2	0	2

Quarterfinals
Michala Spoustová (CZE)	0
Yuliya Ostapchuk (UKR)	8^{F}
Elif Jale Yeşilırmak (TUR)	1	3
Stephanie Maierhofer (AUT)	0	0
Lubov Volosova (RUS)	5	2
Aline Focken (GER)	1	1
Agoro Papavasileiou (GRE)	1	1	2
Audrey Prieto (FRA)	0	2	0

Semifinals
Yuliya Ostapchuk (UKR)	0	2	1
Elif Jale Yeşilırmak (TUR)	1	0	0
Lubov Volosova (RUS)	5^{F}
Agoro Papavasileiou (GRE)	1

Final
Yuliya Ostapchuk (UKR)	0	1	3^{F}
Lubov Volosova (RUS)	1	0	1

Repechage round 2
Monika Michalik (POL)	1	5
Michala Spoustová (CZE)	0	0
Henna Johansson (SWE)	4	2
Aline Focken (GER)	0	0

Bronze medals
Monika Michalik (POL)	1
Elif Jale Yeşilırmak (TUR)	0^{R}
Henna Johansson (SWE)	2	1
Agoro Papavasileiou (GRE)	0	0

=== 72 kg ===
22 April

Round of 16
Lisa Hug (GER)	0	0
Kateryna Burmistrova (UKR)	4	2
Maja Erlandsen (NOR)	1	1	0
Agnieszka Wieszczek (POL)	2	0	1
Svetlana Saenko (MDA)	1	1
Epp Mäe (EST)	0	0
Marina Gastl (AUT)	3	5^{F}
Una Tuba (SRB)	0	0
Diana Mudrag (ROU)	0	1
Kitti Godó (HUN)	1	6^{F}
Yasemin Adar (TUR)	0	0
Dina Ivanova (AZE)	1	7^{F}
Kristīne Odriņa (LAT)	0
Jenny Fransson (SWE)	3^{F}
Cynthia Vescan (FRA)	0	0
Maider Unda (ESP)	1	1

Quarterfinals
Kateryna Burmistrova (UKR)	2	5
Agnieszka Wieszczek (POL)	0	1
Svetlana Saenko (MDA)	3	1
Marina Gastl (AUT)	0	3^{F}
Kitti Godó (HUN)	0	0
Dina Ivanova (AZE)	1	6
Jenny Fransson (SWE)	1	1
Maider Unda (ESP)	0	0

Semifinals
Kateryna Burmistrova (UKR)	1	2
Marina Gastl (AUT)	0	0
Dina Ivanova (AZE)	3	1	1
Jenny Fransson (SWE)	0	4	4

Final
Kateryna Burmistrova (UKR)	0	0
Jenny Fransson (SWE)	1	1

Repechage round 1
Lisa Hug (GER)	0	0
Agnieszka Wieszczek (POL)	2	3
Kristīne Odriņa (LAT)	0	0
Maider Unda (ESP)	1	3

Bronze medals
Agnieszka Wieszczek (POL)	1	1	2
Marina Gastl (AUT)	3	0	0
Maider Unda (ESP)	1	1
Dina Ivanova (AZE)	0	0
