= Sammy Oziti =

Nigerian wrestler and sportswoman

Personal information
- Height: 1.57 m (5 ft 2 in)
- Weight: 51 kg (112 lb)

Sport
- Country: Nigeria
- Sport: Amateur wrestling
- Event: Freestyle
- Club: Delta State Club
- Coached by: Mr. Wamaka
Medal record
Women's freestyle wrestling
Representing Nigeria
All-African Games
Gold medal – first place	2003 Abuja	48 kg
Commonwealth Wrestling Championship
Silver medal – second place	2005 Stellenbosch	48kg
African Wrestling Championships
Gold medal – first place	2006 Pretoria	48 kg
All-African Games
Silver medal – second place	2007 Algiers	48 kg
African Wrestling Championships
Silver medal – second place	2007 Ciaro	48 kg
Silver medal – second place	2008 Tunis	48 kg
Bronze medal – third place	2011 Dakar	48 kg
Bronze medal – third place	2012 Marrakech	48 kg
Commonwealth Wrestling Championship
Silver medal – second place	2013 Johannesburg	48kg

Sammy Oziti (born 1 January 1983) is a Nigerian freestyle wrestler. She won two medals at the All-African Games between 2003 and 2007. She obtained six medals in the African Championship between 2006 and 2012. She also won two silver medals at the Commonwealth Wrestling Championship in 2005 and 2013.

== Sports career ==
Sammy Oziti started her wrestling career in 1998. Her first ever participation at the Africa Games was in the year 2003 in Abuja. At the event, she won a gold medal after defeating her opponent, Bejaoui, Nour El Houda of Tunisia. The following year, she participated in the Olympic Qualification Tournament however ended up in 9th position.

In 2005, Sammy competed in her first Commonwealth Wrestling Championship at Stellenbosch, South Africa. She came in second and won a silver medal, her opponent was Meena from India.

At the African Wrestling Championship in 2006, She won the gold medal having defeated Feten, Ghanmi in the 48 kg event held in Pretoria, RSA. The following year she participated again in the same championship and came in second after Sambou, Isabella from Senegal. She also won a silver medal at the African Games that was held same year in Algiers. In 2008, Sammy participated in another African Wrestling Championship where she ended up gaining another silver medal from the 48 kg event.

At the 2010, she yet competed and won a silver medal. At the 2011 and 2012 African Championship, Sammy earned 2 bronze medals. Her victory in 2012 led to her participation at the Olympic Qualification Tournament where she was ranked 3rd place after competing in the 48 kg category.

In 2013, she was at the Commonwealth Championship that took place in Johannesburg, RSA, and came in second after Nirmala Devi from India. They competed in the 48 kg event and Sammy took home the silver medal.
