= Hrach Hovhannisyan =

Armenian Greco-Roman wrestler

Personal information
- Born: 28 May 1987 (age 39) Armenia
- Height: 1.77 m (5 ft 9 1/2 in)
- Weight: 83 kg (183 lb)

Sport
- Sport: Wrestling
- Event: Greco-Roman
- Coached by: Aram Gasparyan
Medal record
Representing Armenia
Men's Greco-Roman wrestling
World Cup
Bronze medal – third place	2013 Tehran	84 kg

Hrach Hovhannisyan (Armenian: Հրաչ Հովհաննիսյանը, 28 May 1987) is an Armenian Greco-Roman wrestler.

Hovhannisyan was a member of the Armenian Greco-Roman wrestling team at the 2013 Wrestling World Cup. The Armenian team came in fourth place. Hovhannisyan personally won a bronze medal.
