= Farzad Tarash =

Australian freestyle wrestler

Personal information
- Nationality: Australian
- Born: 1 October 1986 (age 40) Tehran, Iran
- Height: 5 ft 4.5 in (164 cm)
- Weight: 132 lb (60 kg)

Sport
- Sport: wrestling
- Club: Hawthorn Citizens Youth Club

Farzad Tarash (Persian: فرزاد تاراش; born 1 October 1986) is a freestyle wrestler from Australia.

An engineer from Melbourne, he was Australia's only competitor in the wrestling competition at the 2012 Summer Olympics. He competed in the 60 kg division after winning a silver medal at the African & Oceania Qualification Tournament in Morocco in March 2012.

He was the Australian champion each year from 2005 to 2012.
