= Mohamed Riad Louafi =

Algerian freestyle wrestler

Personal information
- Nationality: Algeria
- Born: 23 October 1987 (age 38)
- Height: 1.78 m (5 ft 10 in)
- Weight: 84 kg (185 lb)

Sport
- Sport: Wrestling
- Event: Freestyle
- Coached by: Benjedda Mazooz

Mohamed Riad Louafi (Arabic: محمد رياض الوافي; born October 23, 1987, Hussein Dey) is an amateur Algerian freestyle wrestler, who competes in the men's light heavyweight category (84 kg). Louafi represented Algeria at the 2012 Summer Olympics in London, where he competed for the men's 84 kg class. He received a bye for the preliminary round of sixteen, before losing out to Belarus' Soslan Gattsiev, with a two-set technical score (0–2, 3–4), and a classification point score of 1–3.
