= Rabab Eid =

Egyptian freestyle wrestler

Personal information
- Full name: Rabab Eid Sayed Awad
- Born: August 10, 1990 (age 35) Cairo, Egypt

Sport
- Sport: Freestyle wrestling
- Weight class: 55 kg

Rabab Eid Sayed Awad (born 10 August 1990 in Cairo) is an Egyptian freestyle wrestler.

== Career ==
She competed in the freestyle 55 kg event at the 2012 Summer Olympics and was eliminated by Tetyana Lazareva in the 1/8 finals.
