= Yevhen Orlov =

Ukrainian mixed martial artist and former Greco-Roman wrestler

Yevhenii Orlov
- Born: Yevhenii V'iacheslavovych Orlov; January 30, 1989 (age 37); Kryvyi Rih, Ukrainian SSR, Soviet Union
- Height: 6 ft 5 in (1.96 m)
- Weight: 266 lb (121 kg; 19 st 0 lb)
- Division: Heavyweight
- Style: Greco-Roman wrestling
- Fighting out of: Prague, Czech Republic
- Team: Renegade Prague Gym
- Years active: 2018–present

Mixed martial arts record
- Total: 11
- Wins: 9
- By knockout: 7
- By submission: 2
- Losses: 2
- By knockout: 2

Other information
- Mixed martial arts record from Sherdog

Yevhenii V'iacheslavovych Orlov (also Evgeni Orlov, Ukrainian: Євгеній В'ячеславович Орлов; born January 30, 1989) is a Ukrainian mixed martial artist and former Greco-Roman wrestler. He currently compete in the heavyweight division.

== Greco-Roman wrestling career ==
Orlov represented Ukraine at the 2012 Summer Olympics in London, where he competed for the men's 120 kg class. He received a bye for the preliminary round of sixteen match, before losing out to Turkish wrestler and two-time Olympian Rıza Kayaalp, who was able to score four points in two straight periods, leaving Orlov without a single point. He won a bronze medal in his respective division at the 2012 European Wrestling Championships in Belgrade, Serbia, and silver at the 2013 European Wrestling Championships in Tbilisi, Georgia. Orlov is also a member of the wrestling team for Ukraina Dnipropetrovsk, and is coached and trained by Oleksii Valdaiev.

== Mixed martial arts record ==
Professional record breakdown
11 matches	9 wins	2 losses
By knockout	7	2
By submission	2	0

Res.	Record	Opponent	Method	Event	Date	Round	Time	Location	Notes
Loss	9–2	Simon Biyong	TKO (punches)	Oktagon 88	May 16, 2026	1	3:45	Hanover, Germany	
Win	9–1	Arya Sheikh Hosseini	TKO (punches)	Real Fight Arena x I Am Fighter: Special Title Fight	November 11, 2023	2	1:28	Prague, Czech Republic	
Win	8–1	Buğrahan Alparslan	TKO (punches)	I Am Fighter 7	May 6, 2023	1	4:52	Říčany, Czech Republic	Won the inaugural IAF Heavyweight Championship.
Win	7–1	Martin Dědek	TKO (submission to punches)	I Am Fighter 6	November 5, 2022	1	0:28	Prague, Czech Republic	
Win	6–1	Zsolt Balla	TKO (submission to punches)	Real Fight Arena 4	October 8, 2022	1	3:03	Košice, Slovakia	
Win	5–1	David Závoda	KO (punches)	I Am Fighter 5	June 17, 2022	1	2:00	Plzeň, Czech Republic	
Win	4–1	Soslan Gasiev	Submission (arm-triangle choke)	I Am Fighter 4	April 16, 2022	1	2:48	Prague, Czech Republic	
Win	3–1	Alexandru Gorczyca	KO (punch)	Night of Warriors 18	November 20, 2021	1	4:33	Liberec, Czech Republic	
Win	2–1	Radovan Gonšenica	TKO (doctor stoppage)	I Am Fighter 1	October 29, 2019	1	5:00	Prague, Czech Republic	
Loss	1–1	Martin Buday	TKO (punches)	Oktagon Prime 1	April 26, 2019	1	2:27	Košice, Slovakia	
Win	1–0	Dritan Barjamaj	Submission (Von Flue choke)	Fight Nights Global 84	March 2, 2018	1	1:03	Bratislava, Slovakia	Heavyweight debut.
