= Maroi Mezien =

Tunisian wrestler (born 1988)

Personal information
- Born: 28 October 1988 (age 37) Tunis, Tunisia

Sport
- Country: Tunisia
- Sport: Freestyle wrestling

Maroi Mezien (born 28 October 1988 in Tunis) is a Tunisian freestyle wrestler. She competed in the freestyle 48 kg event at the 2012 Summer Olympics; she was defeated in the 1/8 finals by Japan's Hitomi Obara and was eliminated in the repechage round by Isabelle Sambou from Senegal.
