= Abdou Omar =

Egyptian freestyle wrestler

Abdou Omar Abdou Ahmed (born 22 February 1989, in Suez) is an Egyptian freestyle wrestler. He qualified to compete in the 66 kg event at the 2012 Summer Olympics but forfeited his only match after showing up late to the event.
