= Sylvie Datty =

Central African Republic freestyle wrestler

Sylvie Datty-Ngonga Tara-Agoue (born 30 May 1988 in Begoua, Bangui) is a Central African freestyle wrestler. She competed in the freestyle 63 kg event at the 2012 Summer Olympics and was eliminated by Soronzonboldyn Battsetseg in the 1/8 finals.
