= Islam Tolba =

Egyptian Greco-Roman wrestler

Personal information
- Full name: Islam Mohamed Abdelhafiz; Tolba
- Nationality: Egypt
- Born: 8 February 1989 (age 37) Alexandria, Egypt
- Height: 1.78 m (5 ft 10 in)
- Weight: 74 kg (163 lb)

Sport
- Sport: Wrestling
- Event: Greco-Roman

Islam Mohamed Abdelhafiz Tolba (Arabic: إسلام محمد عبد الحفيظ محمد طلبه; born 8 February 1989 in Alexandria) is an amateur Egyptian Greco-Roman wrestler, who competed in the men's middleweight category. Tolba represented Egypt at the 2012 Summer Olympics in London, where he participated in the men's 74 kg class. He lost his qualifying match to Croatia's Neven Žugaj, who was able to score four points in two straight periods, leaving Tolba without a single point.
