= Choucri Atafi =

Moroccan Greco-Roman wrestler

Personal information
- Nationality: Morocco
- Born: 8 December 1981 (age 44) Bourg-en-Bresse, France
- Height: 1.80 m (5 ft 11 in)
- Weight: 96 kg (212 lb)

Sport
- Sport: Wrestling
- Event: Greco-Roman
- Coached by: Pascal Delamarre

Choucri Atafi (Arabic: شكري عطافي; born December 8, 1981, in Bourg-en-Bresse, France) is an amateur Moroccan Greco-Roman wrestler, who competes in the men's heavyweight category. Atafi represented Morocco at the 2012 Summer Olympics in London, where he competed in the men's 96 kg class. He received a bye for the preliminary round of sixteen match, before losing to Tunisia's Hassine Ayari, with a three-set technical score (0–2, 1–0, 0–3), and a classification point score of 1–3.

In 2021, he competed at the 2021 African & Oceania Wrestling Olympic Qualification Tournament hoping to qualify for the 2020 Summer Olympics in Tokyo, Japan.
