= Bilel Ouechtati =

Tunisian freestyle wrestler

Personal information
- Nationality: Tunisia
- Born: 15 February 1991 (age 35) Béja, Tunisia
- Height: 1.72 m (5 ft 7 1/2 in)
- Weight: 74 kg (163 lb)

Sport
- Sport: Wrestling
- Event: Freestyle

Bilel Ouechtati (Arabic: بلال عويشتات; born February 15, 1991, in Béja) is an amateur Tunisian freestyle wrestler, who competes in the men's middleweight category. Ouechtati represented Tunisia at the 2012 Summer Olympics in London, where he competed in the men's 74 kg class. He received a bye for the preliminary round of sixteen match, before losing to Kazakhstan's Abdulkhakim Shapiyev, with a two-set technical score (3–5, 0–1), and a classification point score of 1–3.
