= Haithem Ben Alayech =

Tunisian freestyle wrestler

Personal information
- Nationality: Tunisia
- Born: 10 June 1989 (age 37) Mornag, Tunisia
- Height: 1.65 m (5 ft 5 in)
- Weight: 65 kg (143 lb)

Sport
- Sport: Wrestling
- Event: Freestyle

Haithem Ben Alayech (Arabic: هيثم بلعايش; born 10 June 1989 in Mornag), also spelled Haitem, is an amateur Tunisian freestyle wrestler who played for the men's welterweight category. Ben Alayech represented Tunisia at the 2012 Summer Olympics in London, where he competed for the men's 66 kg class. He did not show up in the qualifying round match against Canada's Haislan Garcia, allowing his opponent to be given a free pass for the next round.
