= Hassine Ayari =

Tunisian wrestler (born 1985)

Personal information
- Nationality: Tunisia
- Born: 4 July 1985 (age 41) Tunis, Tunisia
- Height: 1.89 m (6 ft 2 1/2 in)
- Weight: 96 kg (212 lb)

Sport
- Sport: Wrestling
- Event: Greco-Roman
- Club: ASMT Tunis
- Coached by: Mohammed Said

Hassine Ayari (Arabic: حسين عياري; born July 4, 1985) is an amateur Tunisian Greco-Roman wrestler, who competes in the men's heavyweight category. Ayari represented Tunisia at the 2012 Summer Olympics in London, where he competed in the men's 96 kg class. He defeated Morocco's Choucri Atafi in the preliminary round of sixteen, before losing out in the quarterfinal match to Cuban wrestler and Pan American Games champion Yunior Estrada, who was able to score one point each in two straight periods, leaving Ayari without a single point.
