= Josiane Soloniaina =

Malagasy freestyle wrestler

Personal information
- Full name: Josiane Patricia Soloniaina Andrianirinamalala
- Born: 25 April 1978 (age 48) Itasy, Madagascar
- Height: 160 cm (5 ft 3 in)

Sport
- Country: Madagascar
- Sport: Freestyle wrestling
- Weight class: 55–72 kg (121–159 lb)
Medal record
All-Africa Games
| Bronze medal – third place | 2002 Abuja | 59 kg |
African Championships
| Silver medal – second place | 2008 Tunis | 67 kg |
| Bronze medal – third place | 2012 Marrakech | 72 kg |

Josiane Patricia Soloniaina (born 25 April 1978 in Itasy) is a female wrestler who represented Madagascar at the 2012 Summer Olympics in the women's freestyle 72 kg event. She is one of three athletes on the team to qualify for the Olympics rather than win a wild-card spot.

Soloniaina also competed at the 2002 World Wrestling Championships in the women's freestyle 55 kg event.
