= Isabelle Sambou =

Senegalese freestyle wrestler

Isabelle Sambou (born 20 October 1980, in Mlomp Haer) is a Senegalese freestyle wrestler. She competed in the freestyle 48 kg event at the 2012 Summer Olympics; she advanced to the bronze medal match, where she was defeated by Canadian wrestler Carol Huynh.

At the 2016 Summer Olympics, she competed in the freestyle 53 kg event. She defeated Nguyen Thi Lua of Vietnam in the first round. She was then defeated by the eventual silver medalist, Saori Yoshida of Japan, during the quarterfinals. Sambou was defeated by the eventual bronze medalist, Natalya Synyshyn of Azerbaijan, in the repechage. She was the flagbearer for Senegal during the opening ceremony.

After retiring from the sport, Sambou returned to her village of Mlomp. She began coaching young female wrestlers, causing Mlomp to become one of the few areas in Senegal where it is acceptable for women to wrestle.

Olympic Games
Preceded by Ndiss Kaba Badji	Flagbearer for Senegal; 2016 Rio de Janeiro	Succeeded by Jeanne Boutbien; Mbagnick Ndiaye
