= Georgia at the 2012 Summer Olympics =

- Flag of Georgia
- IOC code: GEO
- NOC: Georgian National Olympic Committee
- Website: www.geonoc.org.ge (in Georgian and English)

in London
- Competitors: 35 in 11 sports
- Flag bearers: Nino Salukvadze (opening); Lasha Shavdatuashvili (closing)
- Medals Ranked 40th: Gold 1 Silver 2 Bronze 3 Total 6

Summer Olympics appearances (overview)
- 1996; 2000; 2004; 2008; 2012; 2016; 2020; 2024

Other related appearances
- Russian Empire (1900–1912); Soviet Union (1952–1988); Unified Team (1992)

Georgia competed at the 2012 Summer Olympics in London, from 27 July to 12 August 2012. This was a list of results of all athletes who qualified for the Olympics and were nominated by the Georgian National Olympic Committee. A total of 35 athletes, 29 men and 6 women, competed in 11 sports, tying the record for the most athletes with Beijing. Among the sports played by the athletes, Georgia marked its Olympic debut in tennis.

The Georgian team included three bronze medalists from the previous games: pistol shooter Nino Salukvadze, and freestyle wrestlers Otar Tushishvili and Giorgi Gogshelidze. Among these champions, Gogshelidze only managed to repeat his bronze medal in men's freestyle wrestling. Salukvadze, gold medalist in pistol shooting at the 1988 Summer Olympics in Seoul, participated in her seventh Olympic Games under three different banners (the other two were Soviet Union and the Unified Team), and was the oldest and most experienced member of the contingent, at age 45. The Georgian National Olympic Committee also appointed her to be the nation's flag bearer at the opening ceremony.

Georgia left London with a total of 7 medals (1 gold, 3 silver, and 3 bronze). Judoka Lasha Shavdatuashvili won the nation's only gold medal on the second day of the competition. Five other medals won by the Georgian athletes were awarded in freestyle and Greco-Roman wrestling. After the games, Weightlifter Rauli Tsirekidze and Wrestler Davit Modzmanashvili both tested positive for banned substances and were disqualified with Modzmanashvili being stripped of his silver medal

== Medalists ==
Medal	Name	Sport	Event	Date
Gold	Lasha Shavdatuashvili	Judo	Men's 66 kg	29 July
Silver	Revaz Lashkhi	Wrestling	Men's Greco-Roman 60 kg	6 August
Silver	Vladimer Khinchegashvili	Wrestling	Men's freestyle 55 kg	10 August
Bronze	Manuchar Tskhadaia	Wrestling	Men's Greco-Roman 66 kg	7 August
Bronze	Dato Marsagishvili	Wrestling	Men's freestyle 84 kg	11 August
Bronze	Giorgi Gogshelidze	Wrestling	Men's freestyle 96 kg	12 August

Medals by sport
Sport	1st place, gold medalist(s)	2nd place, silver medalist(s)	3rd place, bronze medalist(s)	Total
Judo	1	0	0	1
Wrestling	0	2	3	5
Total	1	2	3	6

== Archery ==
Georgia has qualified one archer for the women's individual event.

Athlete	Event	Ranking round		Round of 64	Round of 32	Round of 16	Quarterfinals	Semifinals	Final / BM	
Athlete	Event	Score	Seed	Opposition Score	Opposition Score	Opposition Score	Opposition Score	Opposition Score	Opposition Score	Rank
Kristine Esebua	Women's individual	642	34	van Lamoen (CHI) (31); W 6–0	Lee S-J (KOR) (2); L 2–6	Did not advance				

== Athletics ==
Key

- Note – Ranks given for track events are within the athlete's heat only
- Q = Qualified for the next round
- q = Qualified for the next round as a fastest loser or, in field events, by position without achieving the qualifying target
- NR = National record
- N/A = Round not applicable for the event
- Bye = Athlete not required to compete in round

Men
Track & road events

Athlete	Event	Heat		Semifinal		Final	
Athlete	Event	Result	Rank	Result	Rank	Result	Rank
David Ilariani	110 m hurdles	13.90	8	Did not advance			
Maciej Rosiewicz	50 km walk	—N/a				4:05:20	44

Field events

Athlete	Event	Qualification		Final	
Athlete	Event	Distance	Position	Distance	Position
Boleslav Skhirtladze	Long jump	7.26	35	Did not advance	

Women
Field events

Athlete	Event	Qualification		Final	
Athlete	Event	Distance	Position	Distance	Position
Maiko Gogoladze	Long jump	NM	—	Did not advance	

== Boxing ==
Georgia has qualified one boxer.

Men

Athlete	Event	Round of 32	Round of 16	Quarterfinals	Semifinals	Final	
Athlete	Event	Opposition Result	Opposition Result	Opposition Result	Opposition Result	Opposition Result	Rank
Merab Turkadze	Bantamweight	Ouadahi (ALG); L WO	Did not advance				

== Cycling ==
=== Road ===
Athlete	Event	Time	Rank
Giorgi Nadiradze	Men's road race	Did not finish	

== Gymnastics ==
=== Trampoline ===
Athlete	Event	Qualification		Final	
Athlete	Event	Score	Rank	Score	Rank
Luba Golovina	Women's	101.740	6 Q	52.925	7

== Judo ==
Men

Athlete	Event	Round of 64	Round of 32	Round of 16	Quarterfinals	Semifinals	Repechage	Final / BM	
Athlete	Event	Opposition Result	Opposition Result	Opposition Result	Opposition Result	Opposition Result	Opposition Result	Opposition Result	Rank
Betkili Shukvani	−60 kg	Dickens (AUS); W 0103–0000	Milous (FRA); L 0103–0000	Did not advance					
Lasha Shavdatuashvili	−66 kg	Bye	Zuñiga (CHI); W 0101–0002	Larose (FRA); W 0100–0001	Oates (GBR); W 0100–0000	Ebinuma (JPN); W 0100–0000	Bye	Ungvári (HUN); W 0001–0000	1st place, gold medalist(s)
Nugzar Tatalashvili	−73 kg	Wang K-C (KOR); L 0000–0001	Did not advance						
Avtandil Tchrikishvili	−81 kg	Bye	Marijanović (CRO); W 0100–0001	Stevens (USA); L 0000–1000	Did not advance				
Varlam Liparteliani	−90 kg	—N/a	Dolassem (CMR); W 0003–0101	Anthony (AUS); L 0020–0101	Did not advance				
Levan Zhorzholiani	−100 kg	—N/a	Brata (ROU); W 0102–0013	Gasimov (AZE); L 0011–0002	Did not advance				
Adam Okruashvili	+100 kg	—N/a	Tölzer (GER); L 0003–0201	Did not advance					

== Shooting ==
Georgia has ensured a berth in the shooting's 10m air pistol women event.

Women

Athlete	Event	Qualification		Final	
Athlete	Event	Points	Rank	Points	Rank
Nino Salukvadze	25 m pistol	581	15	did not advance	
Nino Salukvadze	10 m air pistol	376	33	did not advance	

== Swimming ==
Georgia has gained a "Universality place" from the FINA.

Men

Athlete	Event	Heat		Semifinal		Final	
Athlete	Event	Time	Rank	Time	Rank	Time	Rank
Irakli Bolkvadze	200 m breaststroke	2:15.86	28	Did not advance			

== Tennis ==
Athlete	Event	Round of 64	Round of 32	Round of 16	Quarterfinals	Semifinals	Final / BM	
Athlete	Event	Opposition Score	Opposition Score	Opposition Score	Opposition Score	Opposition Score	Opposition Score	Rank
Anna Tatishvili	Women's singles	Vogt (LIE); W 6–2, 6–0	Petrova (RUS); L 3–6, 7–6^{(7–5)}, 2–6	Did not advance				
Margalita Chakhnashvili; Anna Tatishvili	Women's doubles	—N/a	Klepač / Srebotnik (SLO); L 6–7^{(0–7)}, 6–3, 2–6	Did not advance				

== Weightlifting ==
Georgia has qualified 3 men.

Athlete	Event	Snatch		Clean & jerk		Total	Rank
Athlete	Event	Result	Rank	Result	Rank	Total	Rank
Raul Tsirek'idze	Men's −85 kg	162	10	200	=2	362	DSQ
Gia Machavariani	Men's −105 kg	185	2	~~220~~	DNF	185	DNF
Irakli Turmanidze	Men's +105 kg	201	4	232	5	433	5

== Wrestling ==
Georgia has qualified 13 quota places.

Key

- VT – Victory by Fall.
- PP – Decision by Points – the loser with technical points.
- PO – Decision by Points – the loser without technical points.

Men's freestyle

Athlete	Event	Qualification	Round of 16	Quarterfinal	Semifinal	Repechage 1	Repechage 2	Final / BM	
Athlete	Event	Opposition Result	Opposition Result	Opposition Result	Opposition Result	Opposition Result	Opposition Result	Opposition Result	Rank
Vladimer Khinchegashvili	−55 kg	Farag (EGY); W 3–1 ^{PP}	Velikov (BUL); W 3–1 ^{PP}	Amit (IND); W 3–1 ^{PP}	Yumoto (JPN); W 3–1 ^{PP}	Bye		Otarsultanov (RUS); L 1–3 ^{PP}	2nd place, silver medalist(s)
Malkhaz Zarkua	−60 kg	Bye	Fedoryshyn (UKR); W 3–0 ^{PO}	Scott (USA); L 0–5 ^{VT}	Did not advance				9
Otar Tushishvili	−66 kg	Bye	Navruzov (UZB); L 3–1 ^{PP}	Did not advance					12
Davit Khutsishvili	−74 kg	Önörbat (MGL); W 3–1 ^{PP}	Midana (GBS); W 3–1 ^{PP}	Tsargush (RUS); L 0–3 ^{PO}	Did not advance				7
Dato Marsagishvili	−84 kg	Bye	Orgodol (MGL); W 3–1 ^{PP}	Espinal (PUR); L 1–3 ^{PP}	Did not advance	Bye	Dick (NGR); W 5–0 ^{VB}	Gattsiev (BLR); W 3–1 ^{PP}	3rd place, bronze medalist(s)
Giorgi Gogshelidze	−96 kg	Bye	Emara (EGY); W 5–0 ^{VB}	Ceban (MDA); W 3–0 ^{PO}	Varner (USA); L 0–3 ^{PO}	Bye		Kurbanov (UZB); W 3–1 ^{PP}	3rd place, bronze medalist(s)
Davit Modzmanashvili	−120 kg	Bye	Ruíz (MEX); W 3–0 ^{PO}	Shabanbay (KAZ); W 3–0 ^{PO}	Makhov (RUS); W 3–1 ^{PP}	Bye		Taymazov (UZB); L 0–3 ^{PO}	DSQ

Men's Greco-Roman

Athlete	Event	Qualification	Round of 16	Quarterfinal	Semifinal	Repechage 1	Repechage 2	Final / BM	
Athlete	Event	Opposition Result	Opposition Result	Opposition Result	Opposition Result	Opposition Result	Opposition Result	Opposition Result	Rank
Revaz Lashkhi	−60 kg	Bye	Abdelmoneim (EGY); W 3–0 ^{PO}	Kuramagomedov (RUS); W 3–0 ^{PO}	Aliyev (AZE); W 3–1 ^{PP}	Bye		Norouzi (IRI); L 0–3 ^{PO}	2nd place, silver medalist(s)
Manuchar Tskhadaia	−66 kg	Bye	Strebel (SUI); W 3–0 ^{PO}	El-Gharably (EGY); W 3–0 ^{PO}	Lőrincz (HUN); L 0–3 ^{PO}	Bye		Stäbler (GER); W 3–0 ^{PO}	3rd place, bronze medalist(s)
Zurabi Datunashvili	−74 kg	Kim J-H (KOR); W 3–0 ^{PO}	Provisor (USA); W 3–0 ^{PO}	Ahmadov (AZE); L 1–3 ^{PP}	Did not advance				7
Vladimer Gegeshidze	−84 kg	Bye	Tahmasebi (AZE); W 3–1 ^{PP}	Rachyba (UKR); W 3–1 ^{PP}	Khugayev (RUS); L 0–3 ^{PO}	Bye		Gadzhiyev (KAZ); L 1–3 ^{PP}	5
Soso Jabidze	−96 kg	Bye	Guri (BUL); L 1–3 ^{PP}	Did not advance					13
Guram Pherselidze	−120 kg	Bye	Ayub (CHI); W 3–0 ^{PO}	López (CUB); L 0–3 ^{PO}	Did not advance	Bye	El-Trabely (EGY); W 3–1 ^{PP}	Kayaalp (TUR); L 0–3 ^{PO}	5

== See also ==
- Georgia at the 2012 Winter Youth Olympics
