= Wrestling at the 2012 Summer Olympics =

Coordinates: 51.5075°N 0.0297°E

Wrestling at the Games of the XXX Olympiad
- Venue: ExCeL London
- Dates: 5–12 August 2012
- No. of events: 18
- Competitors: 343 from 71 nations

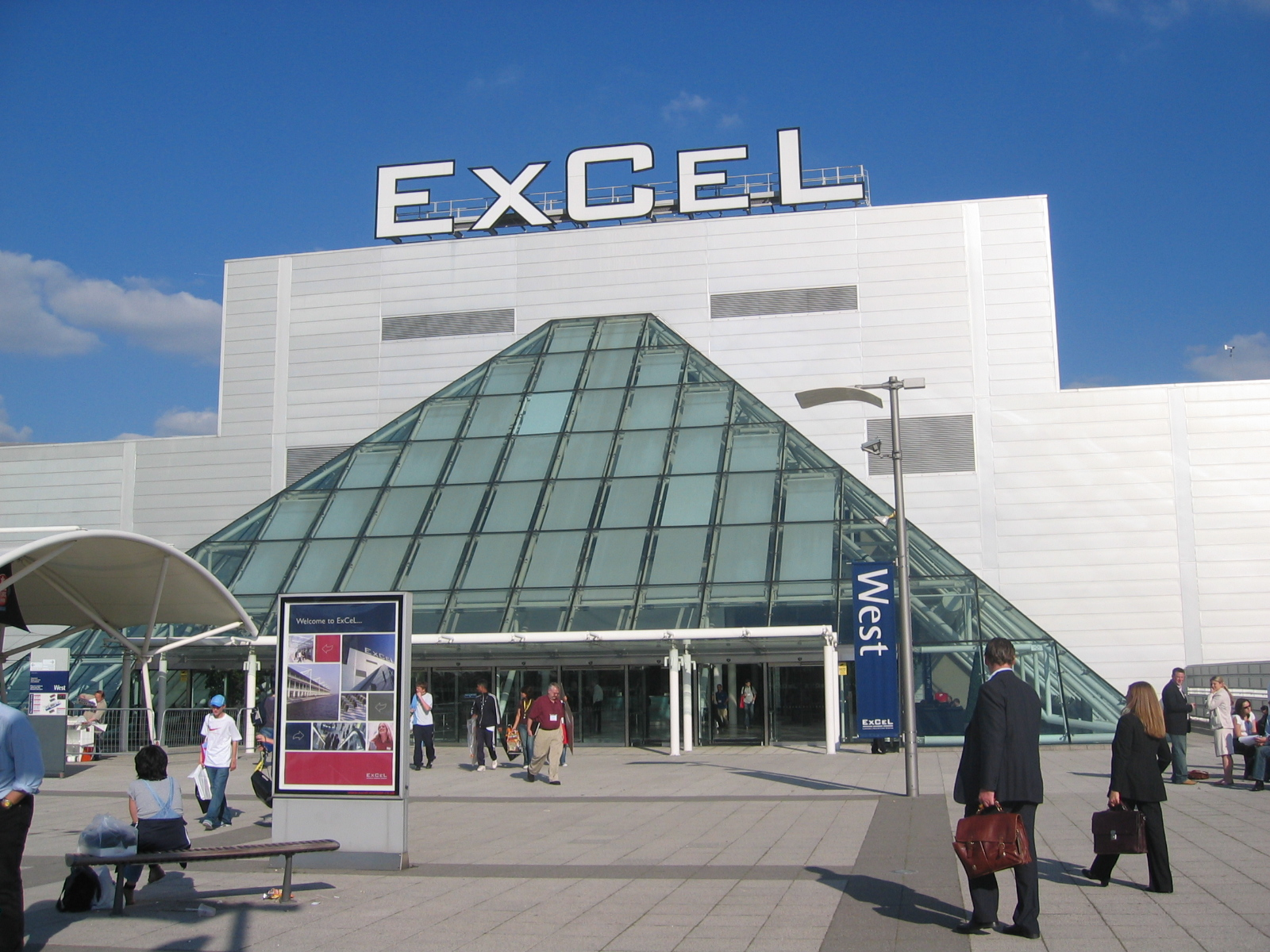
ExCel Exhibition Centre

Wrestling at the 2012 Summer Olympics were held between 5 and 12 August, the final day of the Games, at ExCeL London. It was split into two disciplines, Freestyle and Greco-Roman which were further divided into different weight categories. Men competed in both disciplines whereas women only took part in the freestyle events, with 18 gold medals awarded. Wrestling has been contested at every modern Summer Olympic Games, except Paris 1900.

== Competition format ==
19 men or 18 women competed in each division, plus 6 others allocated either to the host country or by the tripartite commission into divisions yet to be determined prior to the Olympics. Wrestlers determined by lot competed in qualification rounds to reduce the number to 16, thereafter proceeding by simple knockout to determine the finalists who competed for gold and silver. The two groups of wrestlers respectively defeated in the 3 or 4 bouts of the two finalists competed in two serial elimination repechages, with the victor in each repechage being awarded bronze.

== Competition schedule ==
All times are British Summer Time (UTC+1)

=== Men's Greco-Roman ===
Date	Time	Event
Sunday 5 August	13:00–15:45	55 kg & 74 kg qualifications; 1/8 finals; quarterfinals; semifinals
Sunday 5 August	17:45–20:15	55 kg & 74 kg repechage rounds, bronze & gold
Monday 6 August	13:00–15:45	60 kg, 84 kg & 120 kg qualifications; 1/8 finals; quarterfinals; semifinals
Monday 6 August	17:45–20:15	60 kg, 84 kg & 120 kg repechage rounds, bronze & gold
Tuesday 7 August	13:00–15:45	66 kg & 96 kg qualifications; 1/8 finals; quarterfinals; semifinals
Tuesday 7 August	17:45–20:15	66 kg & 96 kg repechage rounds, bronze & gold

=== Women's freestyle ===
Date	Time	Event
Wednesday 8 August	13:00–15:45	48 kg & 63 kg qualifications; 1/8 finals; quarterfinals; semifinals
Wednesday 8 August	17:45–20:15	48 kg & 63 repechage rounds, bronze & gold
Thursday 9 August	13:00–15:45	55 kg & 72 kg qualifications; 1/8 finals; quarterfinals; semifinals
Thursday 9 August	17:45–20:15	55 kg & 72 kg repechage rounds, bronze & gold

=== Men's freestyle ===
Date	Time	Event
Friday 10 August	13:00–15:45	55 kg & 74 kg qualifications; 1/8 finals; quarterfinals; semifinals
Friday 10 August	17:45–20:15	55 kg & 74 kg repechage rounds, bronze & gold
Saturday 11 August	13:00–15:45	60 kg, 84 kg & 120 kg qualifications; 1/8 finals; quarterfinals; semifinals
Saturday 11 August	17:45–20:15	60 kg, 84 kg & 120 kg repechage rounds, bronze & gold
Sunday 12 August	08:30–11:15	66 kg & 96 kg Qualifications; 1/8 finals; quarterfinals; semifinals
Sunday 12 August	12:45–15:15	66 kg & 96 kg repechage rounds, bronze & gold

== Medalists ==
=== Men's freestyle ===
Event	Gold	Silver	Bronze
55 kg	Dzhamal Otarsultanov; Russia	Vladimer Khinchegashvili; Georgia	Yang Kyong-il; North Korea
55 kg	Dzhamal Otarsultanov; Russia	Vladimer Khinchegashvili; Georgia	Shinichi Yumoto; Japan
60 kg^{[a]}	Toghrul Asgarov; Azerbaijan	Besik Kudukhov; Russia	Coleman Scott; United States
60 kg^{[a]}	Toghrul Asgarov; Azerbaijan	Besik Kudukhov; Russia	Yogeshwar Dutt; India
66 kg	Tatsuhiro Yonemitsu; Japan	Sushil Kumar; India	Akzhurek Tanatarov; Kazakhstan
66 kg	Tatsuhiro Yonemitsu; Japan	Sushil Kumar; India	Liván López; Cuba
74 kg^{[b]}	Jordan Burroughs; United States	Sadegh Goudarzi; Iran	Gábor Hatos; Hungary
74 kg^{[b]}	Jordan Burroughs; United States	Sadegh Goudarzi; Iran	Denis Tsargush; Russia
84 kg	Sharif Sharifov; Azerbaijan	Jaime Espinal; Puerto Rico	Dato Marsagishvili; Georgia
84 kg	Sharif Sharifov; Azerbaijan	Jaime Espinal; Puerto Rico	Ehsan Lashgari; Iran
96 kg	Jake Varner; United States	Valeriy Andriytsev; Ukraine	Giorgi Gogshelidze; Georgia
96 kg	Jake Varner; United States	Valeriy Andriytsev; Ukraine	Khetag Gazyumov; Azerbaijan
120 kg^{[c]}	Komeil Ghasemi; Iran	Shared gold	Tervel Dlagnev; United States
120 kg^{[c]}	Bilyal Makhov; Russia	Shared gold	Daulet Shabanbay; Kazakhstan

=== Men's Greco-Roman ===
Event	Gold	Silver	Bronze
55 kg	Hamid Sourian; Iran	Rovshan Bayramov; Azerbaijan	Péter Módos; Hungary
55 kg	Hamid Sourian; Iran	Rovshan Bayramov; Azerbaijan	Mingiyan Semenov; Russia
60 kg	Omid Norouzi; Iran	Revaz Lashkhi; Georgia	Zaur Kuramagomedov; Russia
60 kg	Omid Norouzi; Iran	Revaz Lashkhi; Georgia	Ryutaro Matsumoto; Japan
66 kg	Kim Hyeon-woo; South Korea	Tamás Lőrincz; Hungary	Manuchar Tskhadaia; Georgia
66 kg	Kim Hyeon-woo; South Korea	Tamás Lőrincz; Hungary	Steeve Guénot; France
74 kg	Roman Vlasov; Russia	Arsen Julfalakyan; Armenia	Aleksandr Kazakevič; Lithuania
74 kg	Roman Vlasov; Russia	Arsen Julfalakyan; Armenia	Emin Ahmadov; Azerbaijan
84 kg	Alan Khugaev; Russia	Karam Gaber; Egypt	Daniyal Gadzhiyev; Kazakhstan
84 kg	Alan Khugaev; Russia	Karam Gaber; Egypt	Damian Janikowski; Poland
96 kg	Ghasem Rezaei; Iran	Rustam Totrov; Russia	Artur Aleksanyan; Armenia
96 kg	Ghasem Rezaei; Iran	Rustam Totrov; Russia	Jimmy Lidberg; Sweden
120 kg	Mijaín López; Cuba	Heiki Nabi; Estonia	Rıza Kayaalp; Turkey
120 kg	Mijaín López; Cuba	Heiki Nabi; Estonia	Johan Eurén; Sweden

=== Women's freestyle ===
Event	Gold	Silver	Bronze
48 kg	Hitomi Obara; Japan	Mariya Stadnik; Azerbaijan	Carol Huynh; Canada
48 kg	Hitomi Obara; Japan	Mariya Stadnik; Azerbaijan	Clarissa Chun; United States
55 kg	Saori Yoshida; Japan	Tonya Verbeek; Canada	Jackeline Rentería; Colombia
55 kg	Saori Yoshida; Japan	Tonya Verbeek; Canada	Yuliya Ratkevich; Azerbaijan
63 kg	Kaori Icho; Japan	Jing Ruixue; China	Soronzonboldyn Battsetseg; Mongolia
63 kg	Kaori Icho; Japan	Jing Ruixue; China	Lubov Volosova; Russia
72 kg	Natalia Vorobieva; Russia	Stanka Zlateva; Bulgaria	Guzel Manyurova; Kazakhstan
72 kg	Natalia Vorobieva; Russia	Stanka Zlateva; Bulgaria	Maider Unda; Spain

- ^{Men's freestyle 60 kg} Besik Kudukhov of Russia won the silver medal, and while a retest of his 2012 sample tested positive for banned substances in 2016, the IOC closed the proceedings after learning that Kudukhov died in a car accident in December 2013.
- ^{Men's freestyle 74 kg} Soslan Tigiev of Uzbekistan originally won the bronze medal, but he was disqualified in 2016 after a retest of his 2012 sample tested positive for banned substances.
- ^{Men's freestyle 120 kg} Davit Modzmanashvili of Georgia originally won the silver medal, but was disqualified in January 2019 after a retest of his 2012 sample tested positive for banned substances. Artur Taymazov of Uzbekistan originally won the gold medal, but was disqualified in July 2019 after a retest of his 2012 sample tested positive for banned substances.

== Medal table ==
Rank	Nation	Gold	Silver	Bronze	Total
1	Russia	5	2	4	11
2	Iran	4	1	1	6
3	Japan	4	0	2	6
4	Azerbaijan	2	2	3	7
5	United States	2	0	3	5
6	Cuba	1	0	1	2
7	South Korea	1	0	0	1
8	Georgia	0	2	3	5
9	Hungary	0	1	2	3
10	Armenia	0	1	1	2
10	Canada	0	1	1	2
10	India	0	1	1	2
13	Bulgaria	0	1	0	1
13	China	0	1	0	1
13	Egypt	0	1	0	1
13	Estonia	0	1	0	1
13	Puerto Rico	0	1	0	1
13	Ukraine	0	1	0	1
19	Kazakhstan	0	0	4	4
20	Sweden	0	0	2	2
21	Colombia	0	0	1	1
21	France	0	0	1	1
21	Lithuania	0	0	1	1
21	Mongolia	0	0	1	1
21	North Korea	0	0	1	1
21	Poland	0	0	1	1
21	Spain	0	0	1	1
21	Turkey	0	0	1	1
Totals (28 entries)		19	17	36	72

== Participating nations ==
343 wrestlers from 71 nations participated at the 2012 Olympics

- Algeria (3)
- American Samoa (1)
- Argentina (1)
- Armenia (7)
- Australia (1)
- Austria (1)
- Azerbaijan (13)
- Belarus (11)
- Brazil (1)
- Bulgaria (9)
- Cameroon (1)
- Canada (9)
- Central African Republic (1)
- Chile (1)
- China (7)
- Colombia (3)
- Croatia (2)
- Cuba (12)
- Czech Republic (1)
- Denmark (2)
- Ecuador (2)
- Egypt (13)
- Estonia (2)
- Federated States of Micronesia (1)
- Finland (2)
- France (6)
- Georgia (13)
- Germany (4)
- Great Britain (1)
- Greece (2)
- Guam (1)
- Guinea-Bissau (2)
- Honduras (1)
- Hungary (7)
- India (5)
- Iran (13)
- Iraq (1)
- Italy (1)
- Ivory Coast (1)
- Japan (13)
- Kazakhstan (15)
- Kyrgyzstan (4)
- Latvia (2)
- Lithuania (2)
- Madagascar (1)
- Mexico (2)
- Moldova (2)
- Mongolia (8)
- Morocco (2)
- Namibia (1)
- Nigeria (4)
- North Korea (5)
- Norway (1)
- Poland (4)
- Puerto Rico (3)
- Romania (2)
- Russia (16)
- Senegal (2)
- Serbia (1)
- South Korea (9)
- Spain (1)
- Sweden (6)
- Switzerland (1)
- Tajikistan (4)
- Tunisia (8)
- Turkey (13)
- Ukraine (13)
- United States (17)
- Uzbekistan (8)
- Venezuela (7)
- Vietnam (1)
