= 2011 World Wrestling Championships – Men's Greco-Roman 60 kg =

Men's Greco-Roman 60 kg at the 2011 World Championships
- Venue: Sinan Erdem Dome
- Dates: 13 September 2011
- Competitors: 42 from 42 nations

Medalists
gold medal	Omid Norouzi	Iran
silver medal	Almat Kebispayev	Kazakhstan
bronze medal	Zaur Kuramagomedov	Russia
bronze medal	Ivo Angelov	Bulgaria

The men's Greco-Roman 60 kilograms is a competition featured at the 2011 World Wrestling Championships, and was held at the Sinan Erdem Dome in Istanbul, Turkey on 13 September 2011.

== Results ==
Legend

- R — Retired

=== Finals ===
Semifinals				Final
Omid Norouzi (IRI)	2	0	6
Jung Ji-hyun (KOR)	0	4	0	Omid Norouzi (IRI)	2	0	6
Almat Kebispayev (KAZ)	2	1		Almat Kebispayev (KAZ)	0	4	5
Luis Liendo (VEN)	0	0

=== Top half ===
==== Section 1 ====
Round of 64

Round of 32
Erik Weiß (GER)	2	1	0
Zaur Kuramagomedov (RUS)	0	2	1
Kostyantyn Balitskyi (UKR)	2	0	0
Omid Norouzi (IRI)	0	3	2
Mustafa Sağlam (TUR)	3	1
Vladimiros Matias (GRE)	1	0
Sheng Jiang (CHN)	1	1
István Kozak (HUN)	0	0

Round of 16
Zaur Kuramagomedov (RUS)	0	0
Omid Norouzi (IRI)	1	1
Mustafa Sağlam (TUR)	2	0	0
Sheng Jiang (CHN)	2	3	1

Quarterfinals
Omid Norouzi (IRI)	2	5
Sheng Jiang (CHN)	0	0

==== Section 2 ====
Round of 64

Round of 32
Patrick Stadelmann (SUI)	0	1
Jarkko Ala-Huikku (FIN)	2	2
Davor Štefanek (SRB)	2	1
Eusebiu Diaconu (ROU)	0	0
Tarik Belmadani (FRA)	1	0	0
Jung Ji-hyun (KOR)	0	5	2
Revaz Lashkhi (GEO)	4	1
Ryutaro Matsumoto (JPN)	0	0

Round of 16
Jarkko Ala-Huikku (FIN)	2	0	0
Davor Štefanek (SRB)	0	3	2
Jung Ji-hyun (KOR)	4	0	2
Revaz Lashkhi (GEO)	1	2	0

Quarterfinals
Davor Štefanek (SRB)	0	0
Jung Ji-hyun (KOR)	1	2

=== Bottom half ===
==== Section 3 ====
Round of 64
Farruh Bekov (TJK)	0	0
Tonimir Sokol (CRO)	1	7
Dzmitry Alenski (BLR)	4	0	2
Chao Yin-lung (TPE)	0	1	1

Round of 32
Almat Kebispayev (KAZ)	2	2
Ivo Angelov (BUL)	2	0
István Lévai (SVK)	2	0
Ruslan Tyumenbayev (KGZ)	6	1
Ulf Nilsson (SWE)	0	0
Anders Ekström (DEN)	2	3
Tonimir Sokol (CRO)	0	1	1
Dzmitry Alenski (BLR)	1	0	0

Round of 16
Almat Kebispayev (KAZ)	4	1
Ruslan Tyumenbayev (KGZ)	1	0
Anders Ekström (DEN)	3	1
Tonimir Sokol (CRO)	0	1

Quarterfinals
Almat Kebispayev (KAZ)	7	1
Anders Ekström (DEN)	0	0

==== Section 4 ====
Round of 64
Jansel Ramírez (DOM)	0	3	0
Edward Barsegjan (POL)	1	2	3
Albert Baghumyan (ESP)	0	0
Hasan Aliyev (AZE)	1	1
Manuel López (MEX)	2	2
Tạ Ngọc Tân (VIE)	0	0
Diego Romanelli (BRA)	0	0
Vincenzo Macrì (ITA)	1	7
Joe Betterman (USA)	0	0
Luis Liendo (VEN)	3	1
Dilshod Aripov (UZB)	0	0
Stig-André Berge (NOR)	1	3
Dritano Hajrizi (SLO)	0	0
Vahan Juharyan (ARM)	4	6
Michal Novák (CZE)	2	3
Manuel Almeida (POR)	0	3

Round of 32
Edward Barsegjan (POL)	0	0
Hasan Aliyev (AZE)	1	2
Manuel López (MEX)	4	0	1
Vincenzo Macrì (ITA)	2	1	0
Luis Liendo (VEN)	0	1	3
Stig-André Berge (NOR)	1	0	0
Vahan Juharyan (ARM)	0	1	2
Michal Novák (CZE)	1	0	0

Round of 16
Hasan Aliyev (AZE)	2	3
Manuel López (MEX)	0	0
Luis Liendo (VEN)	0	1	1
Vahan Juharyan (ARM)	1	0	0

Quarterfinals
Hasan Aliyev (AZE)	1	0	0
Luis Liendo (VEN)	0	2	1

=== Repechage ===
Repechage round 2
Kostyantyn Balitskyi (UKR)	0	0
Zaur Kuramagomedov (RUS)	1	1
Ivo Angelov (BUL)	0	1	1
Ruslan Tyumenbayev (KGZ)	1	0	0

Repechage round 3
Zaur Kuramagomedov (RUS)	2	3
Sheng Jiang (CHN)	0	0
Ivo Angelov (BUL)	6	2
Anders Ekström (DEN)	0	0

Bronze medals
Zaur Kuramagomedov (RUS)	3
Jung Ji-hyun (KOR)	0^{R}
Ivo Angelov (BUL)	2	3
Luis Liendo (VEN)	0	0
