= Azerbaijan at the 2012 Summer Olympics =

- IOC code: AZE
- NOC: National Olympic Committee of the Republic of Azerbaijan
- Website: www.olympic.az (in Azerbaijani and English)

in London
- Competitors: 53 in 14 sports
- Flag bearers: Elnur Mammadli (opening); Toghrul Asgarov (closing)
- Medals Ranked 30th: Gold 2 Silver 2 Bronze 5 Total 9

Summer Olympics appearances (overview)
- 1996; 2000; 2004; 2008; 2012; 2016; 2020; 2024

Other related appearances
- Russian Empire (1900–1912); Soviet Union (1952–1988); Unified Team (1992)

Azerbaijan competed at the 2012 Summer Olympics in London, United Kingdom, from 27 July to 12 August 2012. This was the nation's fifth consecutive appearance at the Olympics in the post-Soviet era. The National Olympic Committee of the Azerbaijani Republic sent the nation's largest delegation to the Games. A total of 53 athletes, 39 men and 14 women, competed in 15 sports. There was only a single competitor in road cycling, equestrian show jumping, fencing, and shooting. The Azerbaijani athletes also included their only defending champion, judoka Elnur Mammadli, who became the nation's flag bearer at the opening ceremony.

Azerbaijan left London with a total of 10 medals (2 gold, 2 silver, and 6 bronze), which doubled the nation's overall medal count at the 2004 Summer Olympics in Athens. This was also the nation's most successful Olympics, winning the largest number of medals received at a single games. More than half of these medals were awarded in wrestling, including gold medals won by Toghrul Asgarov and Sharif Sharifov from the men's freestyle events.

== Medalists ==
Main article: 2012 Summer Olympics medal table

Medal	Name	Sport	Event	Date
Gold	Toghrul Asgarov	Wrestling	Men's freestyle 60 kg	11 August
Gold	Sharif Sharifov	Wrestling	Men's freestyle 84 kg	11 August
Silver	Rovshan Bayramov	Wrestling	Men's Greco-Roman 55 kg	5 August
Silver	Mariya Stadnik	Wrestling	Women's freestyle 48 kg	8 August
Bronze	Emin Ahmadov	Wrestling	Men's Greco-Roman 74 kg	5 August
Bronze	Yuliya Ratkevich	Wrestling	Women's freestyle 55 kg	9 August
Bronze	Teymur Mammadov	Boxing	Men's heavyweight	10 August
Bronze	Magomedrasul Majidov	Boxing	Men's super heavyweight	10 August
Bronze	Khetag Gazyumov	Wrestling	Men's freestyle 96 kg	12 August
Bronze	Valentin Hristov	Weightlifting	Men's 56 kg	29 July

Medals by sport
Sport	1st place, gold medalist(s)	2nd place, silver medalist(s)	3rd place, bronze medalist(s)	Total
Wrestling	2	2	3	7
Boxing	0	0	2	2
Total	2	2	5	9

== Competitors ==
Sport	Men	Women	Total
Athletics	2	1	3
Boxing	7	1	8
Canoeing	3	0	3
Cycling	0	1	1
Equestrian	1	0	1
Fencing	0	1	1
Gymnastics	1	1	2
Judo	6	2	8
Rowing	1	1	2
Shooting	0	1	1
Swimming	1	1	2
Taekwondo	1	1	2
Weightlifting	5	1	6
Wrestling	11	2	13
Total	39	14	53

Medals by date
Day	Date	1st place, gold medalist(s)	2nd place, silver medalist(s)	3rd place, bronze medalist(s)	Total
Day 1	28 July	0	0	0	0
Day 2	29 July	0	0	0	0
Day 3	30 July	0	0	0	0
Day 4	31 July	0	0	0	0
Day 5	1 August	0	0	0	0
Day 6	2 August	0	0	0	0
Day 7	3 August	0	0	0	0
Day 8	4 August	0	0	0	0
Day 9	5 August	0	1	1	2
Day 10	6 August	0	0	0	0
Day 11	7 August	0	0	0	0
Day 12	8 August	0	1	0	1
Day 13	9 August	0	0	1	1
Day 14	10 August	0	0	2	2
Day 15	11 August	2	0	0	2
Day 16	12 August	0	0	1	1
Total		2	2	5	9

== Athletics ==
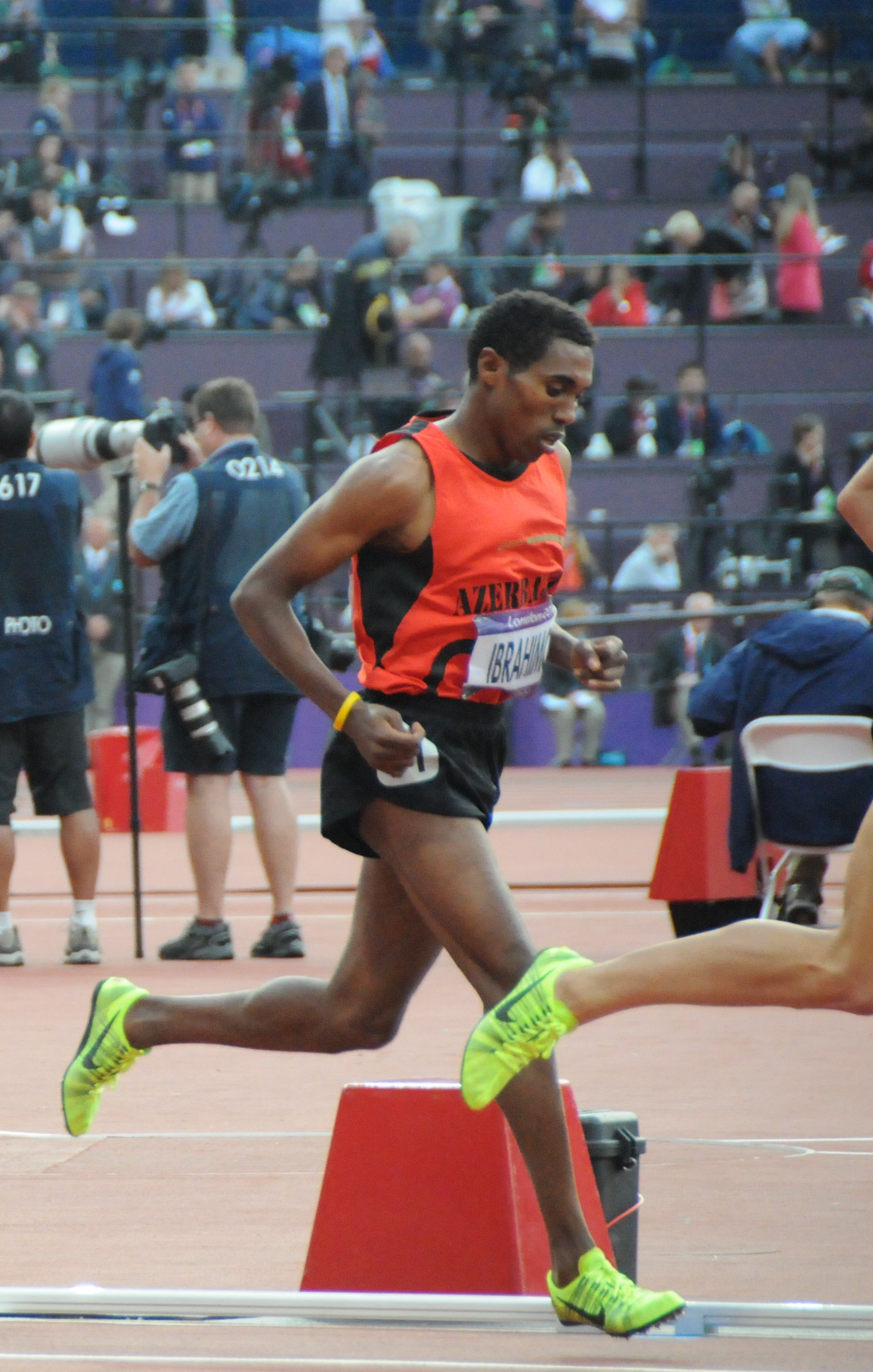
Hayle Ibrahimov finished ninth in the men's 5000 metres.

Key

- Note – Ranks given for track events are within the athlete's heat only
- Q = Qualified for the next round
- q = Qualified for the next round as a fastest loser or, in field events, by position without achieving the qualifying target
- NR = National record
- N/A = Round not applicable for the event
- Bye = Athlete not required to compete in round

Men
Track & road events

Athlete	Event	Heat		Final	
Athlete	Event	Result	Rank	Result	Rank
Hayle Ibrahimov	5000 m	13:25.23	1 Q	13:45.37	9

Field events

Athlete	Event	Qualification		Final	
Athlete	Event	Distance	Position	Distance	Position
Dmitriy Marshin	Hammer throw	72.85	19	did not advance	

Women
Track & road events

Athlete	Event	Heat		Final	
Athlete	Event	Result	Rank	Result	Rank
Layes Abdullayeva	5000 m	15:45.69	17	did not advance	

== Boxing ==
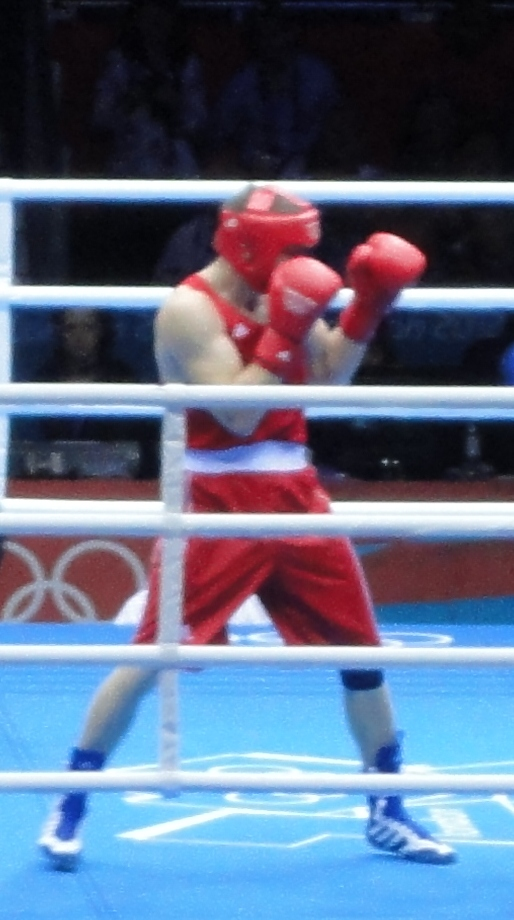
Soltan Migitinov at the 2012 Summer Olympics

Men

Athlete	Event	Round of 32	Round of 16	Quarterfinals	Semifinals	Final	
Athlete	Event	Opposition Result	Opposition Result	Opposition Result	Opposition Result	Opposition Result	Rank
Elvin Mamishzadeh	Flyweight	Tögstsogt (MGL); L 11–18	did not advance				
Magomed Abdulhamidov	Bantamweight	Bye	Shimizu (JPN); L RSC*	Did not advance			
Heybatulla Hajialiyev	Light welterweight	Houya (TUN); L 16–19	Did not advance				
Soltan Migitinov	Middleweight	Hikal (EGY); W 20–12	Falcão (BRA); L 11–24	Did not advance			
Vatan Huseynli	Light heavyweight	Góngora (ECU); L 8–9	Did not advance				
Teymur Mammadov	Heavyweight	—N/a	Opetaia (AUS); W 12–11	Karneyeu (BLR); W 19–19	Russo (ITA); L 13–15	Did not advance	3rd place, bronze medalist(s)
Magomedrasul Majidov	Super heavyweight	—N/a	Mwamba (COD); W RSC	Omarov (RUS); W 17–14	Cammarelle (ITA); L 12–13	Did not advance	3rd place, bronze medalist(s)

- Initially the judges awarded the victory to Abdulhamidov who beat Shimizu 22:17. The Japanese team appealed the decision claiming the referee had overlooked three of Abdulhamidov's six falls during the fixture. Upon further review, the judges decided to annul the initial result and declared Shimizu the winner.

Women

Athlete	Event	Round of 16	Quarterfinals	Semifinals	Final	
Athlete	Event	Opposition Result	Opposition Result	Opposition Result	Opposition Result	Rank
Elena Vystropova	Middleweight	Ogoke (NGR); L 12–14	Did not advance			

== Canoeing ==
=== Sprint ===
Athlete	Event	Heat		Semifinal		Final	
Athlete	Event	Time	Rank	Time	Rank	Time	Rank
Valentin Demyanenko	Men's C-1 200 m	44.194	7	Did not advance			
Sergey Bezugliy; Maksim Prokopenko	Men's C-2 1000 m	3:38.042	1 FA	Bye		3:37.219	4

Qualification Legend: FA = Qualify to final (medal); FB = Qualify to final B (non-medal);

== Cycling ==
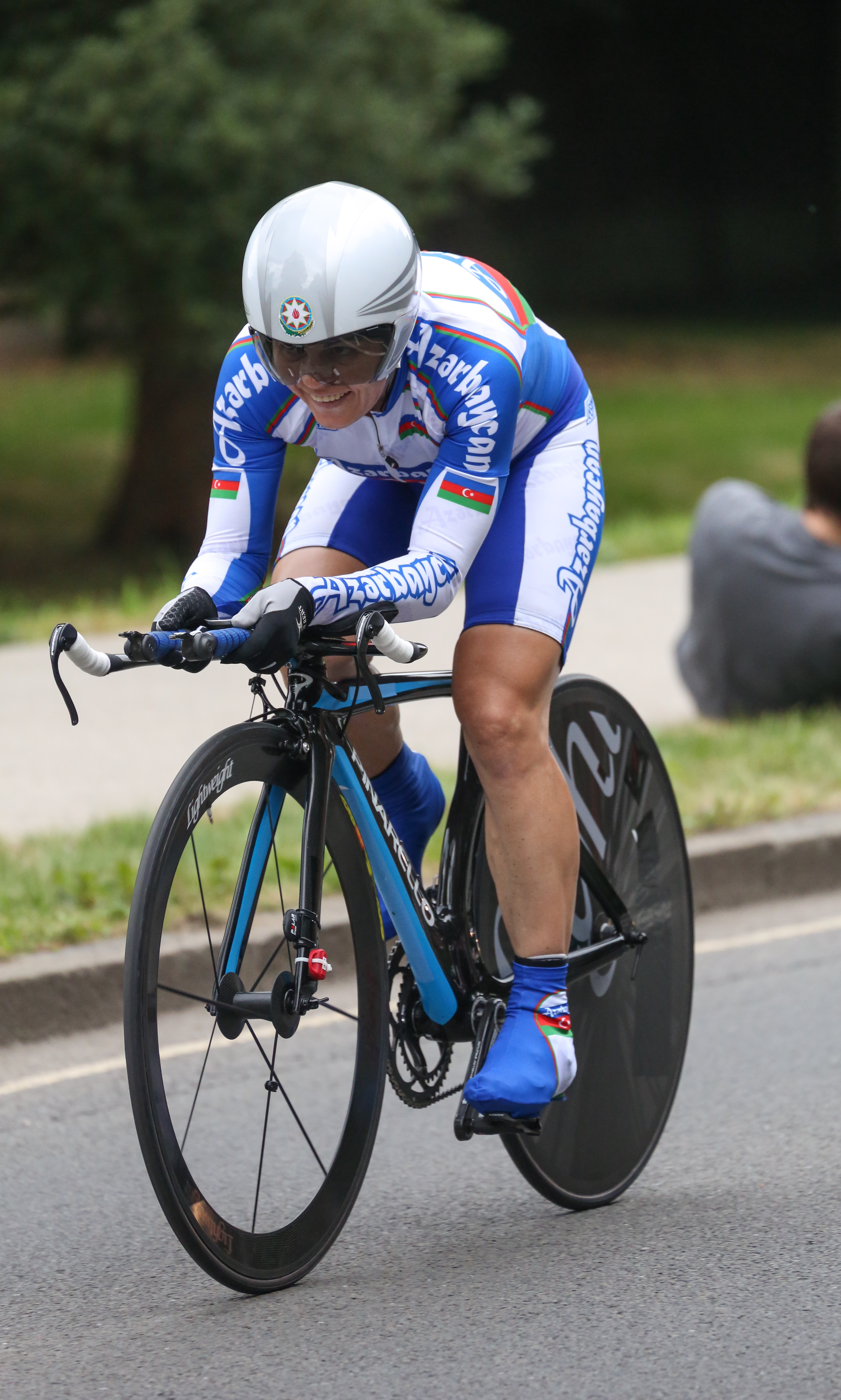
Elena Tchalykh competing in time trial

=== Road ===
Athlete	Event	Time	Rank
Elena Tchalykh	Women's road race	Did not finish	
Elena Tchalykh	Women's time trial	41:47.06	20

== Equestrian ==
=== Show jumping ===
Athlete	Horse	Event	Qualification								Final					
Athlete	Horse	Event	Round 1		Round 2			Round 3			Round A		Round B		Total	
Athlete	Horse	Event	Penalties	Rank	Penalties	Total	Rank	Penalties	Total	Rank	Penalties	Rank	Penalties	Rank	Penalties	Rank
Jamal Rahimov	Warrior	Individual	5	53	13	18	60	Did not advance								

== Fencing ==
Women

Athlete	Event	Round of 32	Round of 16	Quarterfinal	Semifinal	Final / BM	
Athlete	Event	Opposition Score	Opposition Score	Opposition Score	Opposition Score	Opposition Score	Rank
Sabina Mikina	Individual sabre	Bujdoso (GER); W 15–13	Kharlan (UKR); L 10–15	Did not advance			

== Gymnastics ==
=== Artistic ===
Men

Athlete	Event	Qualification								Final							
Athlete	Event	Apparatus						Total	Rank	Apparatus						Total	Rank
Athlete	Event	F	PH	R	V	PB	HB	Total	Rank	F	PH	R	V	PB	HB	Total	Rank
Shakir Shikhaliyev	All-around	14.600	12.866	13.166	15.433	13.666	10.633	80.364	40	did not advance							

=== Rhythmic ===
Women

Athlete	Event	Qualification						Final					
Athlete	Event	Hoop	Ball	Clubs	Ribbon	Total	Rank	Hoop	Ball	Clubs	Ribbon	Total	Rank
Aliya Garayeva	Individual	27.450	28.350	27.850	28.200	111.850	3 Q	27.925	27.825	27.575	28.250	111.575	4

== Judo ==
Men

Athlete	Event	Round of 64	Round of 32	Round of 16	Quarterfinal	Semifinal	Repechage	Final / BM	
Athlete	Event	Opposition Result	Opposition Result	Opposition Result	Opposition Result	Opposition Result	Opposition Result	Opposition Result	Rank
Ilgar Mushkiyev	−60 kg	Bye	Davtyan (ARM); L 0000–0101	Did not advance					
Tarlan Karimov	−66 kg	Bye	Mogushkov (RUS); W 0021–0011	Awad (EGY); W 0000–0002	Uriarte (ESP); L 0001–0021	Did not advance	Zagrodnik (POL); L 0000–0010	Did not advance	7
Rustam Orujov	−73 kg	Bye	van Zyl (RSA); W 0100–0101	Isaev (RUS); L 0000–1001	Did not advance				
Elnur Mammadli	−81 kg	Valois-Fortier (CAN); L 0001–0001	did not advance						
Elkhan Mammadov	−90 kg	—N/a	Lambert (GER); W 0111–0001	Song D-N (KOR); L 0011–0000	did not advance				
Elmar Gasimov	−100 kg	—N/a	Rakov (KAZ); W 0000–0011	Zhorzholiani (GEO); W 0011–0002	Hwang H-T (KOR); L 0002–0021	Did not advance	Sayidov (UZB); L 0000–1000	Did not advance	7

Women

Athlete	Event	Round of 32	Round of 16	Quarterfinal	Semifinal	Repechage	Final / BM	
Athlete	Event	Opposition Result	Opposition Result	Opposition Result	Opposition Result	Opposition Result	Opposition Result	Rank
Kifayat Gasimova	−57 kg	Bye	Matsumoto (JPN); L 0000–0010	did not advance				
Ramila Yusubova	−63 kg	Hayytbaeva (TKM); W 0111–0000	Joung D-W (KOR); L 1000–0000	did not advance				

== Rowing ==
Men

Athlete	Event	Heats		Repechage		Quarterfinals		Semifinals		Final	
Athlete	Event	Time	Rank	Time	Rank	Time	Rank	Time	Rank	Time	Rank
Aleksandar Aleksandrov	Single sculls	6:49.81	2 Q	Bye		6:56.36	3 SA/B	7:20.80	3 FA	7:09.42	5

Women

Athlete	Event	Heats		Repechage		Quarterfinals		Semifinals		Final	
Athlete	Event	Time	Rank	Time	Rank	Time	Rank	Time	Rank	Time	Rank
Natalya Mustafayeva	Single sculls	7:46.01	2 Q	Bye		8:00.26	3 SA/B	8:06.83	6 FB	8:23.64	12

Qualification Legend: FA=Final A (medal); FB=Final B (non-medal); FC=Final C (non-medal); FD=Final D (non-medal); FE=Final E (non-medal); FF=Final F (non-medal); SA/B=Semifinals A/B; SC/D=Semifinals C/D; SE/F=Semifinals E/F; Q=Quarterfinals; R=Repechage

== Shooting ==
Women

Athlete	Event	Qualification		Final	
Athlete	Event	Score	Rank	Score	Rank
Irada Ashumova	25 m pistol	578	23	Did not advance	
Irada Ashumova	10 m air pistol	372	39	Did not advance	

== Swimming ==
Azerbaijan sent two swimmers to the London games, by Universality places. Butterfly swimmer Yevgeniy Lazuka previously competed under Belarus in Beijing.

Men

Athlete	Event	Heat		Semifinal		Final	
Athlete	Event	Time	Rank	Time	Rank	Time	Rank
Yevgeniy Lazuka	100 m butterfly	53.86	38	Did not advance			

Women

Athlete	Event	Heat		Semifinal		Final	
Athlete	Event	Time	Rank	Time	Rank	Time	Rank
Oksana Hatamkhanova	100 m breaststroke	1:25.52	44	did not advance			

== Taekwondo ==
Athlete	Event	Preliminary	Quarterfinal	Semifinal	Repechage	Bronze medal	Final	
Athlete	Event	Opposition Result	Opposition Result	Opposition Result	Opposition Result	Opposition Result	Opposition Result	Rank
Ramin Azizov	Men's −80 kg	Lopez (USA); W 3–2	Sarmiento (ITA); L 1–2	Did not advance				
Farida Azizova	Women's −67 kg	Sergerie (CAN); L 0–1	Did not advance					

== Weightlifting ==
Men

Athlete	Event	Snatch		Clean & jerk		Total	Rank
Athlete	Event	Result	Rank	Result	Rank	Total	Rank
Valentin Hristov	−56 kg	127	2	159	2	286	DSQ*^{1}
Afgan Bayramov	−69 kg	~~142~~	DNF	—	—	—	DNF
Sardar Hasanov*^{2}	−69 kg	145	5	176	8	321	8
Intigam Zairov	−94 kg	182	3	215	7	397	6
Velichko Cholakov^{†}	+105 kg	Withdrew					

- ^{1} On 29 March 2019, the IOC stripped Valentin Hristov of his bronze medal.
- ^{2} Sardar Hasanov replaced Ivan Stoitsov on the team on 21 July 2012, due to Stoitsov's injury.

^{†} Velichko Cholakov did not compete in the event due to an injury.

Women

Athlete	Event	Snatch		Clean & jerk		Total	Rank
Athlete	Event	Result	Rank	Result	Rank	Total	Rank
Boyanka Kostova	−58 kg	105	3	128	3	233	5

== Wrestling ==
Key

- VT - Victory by Fall.
- PP - Decision by Points - the loser with technical points.
- PO - Decision by Points - the loser without technical points.

Men's freestyle

Athlete	Event	Qualification	Round of 16	Quarterfinal	Semifinal	Repechage 1	Repechage 2	Final / BM	
Athlete	Event	Opposition Result	Opposition Result	Opposition Result	Opposition Result	Opposition Result	Opposition Result	Opposition Result	Rank
Toghrul Asgarov	−60 kg	Bye	Schleicher (GER); W 3–1 ^{PP}	Yumoto (JPN); W 3–1 ^{PP}	Scott (USA); W 3–0 ^{PO}	Bye		Kudukhov (RUS); W 3–0 ^{PO}	1st place, gold medalist(s)
Jabrayil Hasanov	−66 kg	Bye	Bazan (BUL); W 3–1 ^{PP}	Shabanau (BLR); W 3–1 ^{PP}	Yonemitsu (JPN); L 0–3 ^{PO}	Bye		López (CUB); L 1–3 ^{PP}	5
Ashraf Aliyev	−74 kg	Takatani (JPN); W 3–0 ^{PO}	Tsargush (RUS); L 1–3 ^{PP}	Did not advance					9
Sharif Sharifov	−84 kg	Bye	Bölükbaşı (TUR); W 3–1 ^{PP}	Herbert (USA); W 3–1 ^{PP}	Lashgari (IRI); W 3–1 ^{PP}	Bye		Espinal (PUR); W 3–1 ^{PP}	1st place, gold medalist(s)
Khetag Gazyumov	−96 kg	Bye	Sheikhau (BLR); W 3–0 ^{PO}	Andriitsev (UKR); L 1–3 ^{PP}	Did not advance	Bye	Iskandari (TJK); W 3–1 ^{PP}	Yazdani (IRI); W 5–0 ^{VB}	3rd place, bronze medalist(s)
Jamaladdin Magomedov	−120 kg	Makhov (RUS); L 0–3 ^{PO}	Did not advance						16

Men's Greco-Roman

Athlete	Event	Qualification	Round of 16	Quarterfinal	Semifinal	Repechage 1	Repechage 2	Final / BM	
Athlete	Event	Opposition Result	Opposition Result	Opposition Result	Opposition Result	Opposition Result	Opposition Result	Opposition Result	Rank
Rovshan Bayramov	−55 kg	Semenov (RUS); W 3–0 ^{PO}	Mango (USA); W 3–0 ^{PO}	Li Sj (CHN); W 3–0 ^{PO}	Choi G-J (KOR); W 3–0 ^{PO}	Bye		Sourian (IRI); L 0–3 ^{PO}	2nd place, silver medalist(s)
Hasan Aliyev	−60 kg	Bye	Berge (NOR); W 3–1 ^{PP}	Jung J-H (KOR); W 3–0 ^{PO}	Lashkhi (GEO); L 1–3 ^{PP}	Bye		Kuramagomedov (RUS); L 0–3 ^{PO}	5
Emin Ahmadov	−74 kg	Bye	Žugaj (CRO); W 3–0 ^{PO}	Datunashvili (GEO); W 3–1 ^{PP}	Julfalakyan (ARM); L 0–3 ^{PO}	Bye		Kikiniou (BLR); W 3–1 ^{PP}	3rd place, bronze medalist(s)
Saman Tahmasebi	−84 kg	Bye	Gegeshidze (GEO); L 1–3 ^{PP}	did not advance					11
Shalva Gadabadze	−96 kg	Bye	Totrov (RUS); L 1–3 ^{PP}	Did not advance		Bye	Lidberg (SWE); L 1–3 ^{PP}	Did not advance	10

Women's freestyle

Athlete	Event	Qualification	Round of 16	Quarterfinal	Semifinal	Repechage 1	Repechage 2	Final / BM	
Athlete	Event	Opposition Result	Opposition Result	Opposition Result	Opposition Result	Opposition Result	Opposition Result	Opposition Result	Rank
Mariya Stadnik	−48 kg	Bye	Chun (USA); W 3–0 ^{PO}	Matkowska (POL); W 3–1 ^{PP}	Merleni (UKR); W 3–0 ^{PO}	Bye		Obara (JPN); L 1–3 ^{PP}	2nd place, silver medalist(s)
Yuliya Ratkevich	−55 kg	Bye	Prevolaraki (GRE); W 3–0 ^{PO}	Yoshida (JPN); L 0–3 ^{PO}	Did not advance	Bye	Campbell (USA); W 0–3 ^{PO}	Zholobova (RUS); W 3–1 ^{PP}	3rd place, bronze medalist(s)
