= Iran at the 2012 Summer Olympics =

- IOC code: IRI
- NOC: National Olympic Committee of the Islamic Republic of Iran
- Website: www.olympic.ir (in Persian and English)

in London
- Competitors: 53 in 14 sports
- Flag bearers: Ali Mazaheri (opening); Komeil Ghasemi (closing)
- Medals Ranked 12th: Gold 7 Silver 5 Bronze 1 Total 13

Summer Olympics appearances (overview)
- 1900; 1904–1936; 1948; 1952; 1956; 1960; 1964; 1968; 1972; 1976; 1980–1984; 1988; 1992; 1996; 2000; 2004; 2008; 2012; 2016; 2020; 2024; 2028

Iran competed at the 2012 Summer Olympics in London, from 27 July to 12 August 2012. The nation has competed at every Summer Olympic games since its return in 1948, after having made their debut in 1900, with the exception of the 1980 and 1984 Summer Olympics. The National Olympic Committee of the Islamic Republic of Iran sent the nation's second-largest delegation to the Games, one less than it sent to Beijing. A total of 53 athletes, 45 men and 8 women, competed in 14 sports. This was also the youngest delegation in Iran's Olympic history, with half the team under the age of 25, and many of them are expected to reach their peak in time for the 2016 Summer Olympics in Rio de Janeiro. Heavyweight boxer Ali Mazaheri was the nation's flag bearer at the opening ceremony.

Iran left London with a total of 13 medals (7 gold, 5 silver, and 1 bronze), finishing twelfth in the overall medal standings. This was also the most successful Olympics for the Middle East, winning the largest number of medals at a single games, and surpassing by just double the record from Athens. Notable accomplishments included the nation's first gold medals in men's Greco-Roman wrestling, and the nation's first medal in athletics, won by discus thrower Ehsan Haddadi.

== Medalists ==
| Medal | Name | Sport | Event | Date |
|---|---|---|---|---|
| Gold | Saeid Mohammadpour | Weightlifting | Men's 94kg | 4 August |
| Gold | Hamid Sourian | Wrestling | Men's Greco-Roman 55 kg | 5 August |
| Gold | Omid Norouzi | Wrestling | Men's Greco-Roman 60 kg | 6 August |
| Gold | Navab Nassirshalal | Weightlifting | Men's 105 kg | 6 August |
| Gold | Behdad Salimi | Weightlifting | Men's +105 kg | 7 August |
| Gold | Ghasem Rezaei | Wrestling | Men's Greco-Roman 96 kg | 7 August |
| Gold | Komeil Ghasemi | Wrestling | Men's freestyle 120 kg | 11 August |
| Silver | Kianoush Rostami | Weightlifting | Men's 85 kg | 3 August |
| Silver | Ehsan Haddadi | Athletics | Men's discus throw | 7 August |
| Silver | Sajjad Anoushiravani | Weightlifting | Men's +105 kg | 7 August |
| Silver | Mohammad Bagheri Motamed | Taekwondo | Men's 68 kg | 9 August |
| Silver | Sadegh Goudarzi | Wrestling | Men's freestyle 74 kg | 10 August |
| Bronze | Ehsan Lashgari | Wrestling | Men's freestyle 84 kg | 11 August |

Medals by sport
| Sport | 1st place, gold medalist(s) | 2nd place, silver medalist(s) | 3rd place, bronze medalist(s) | Total |
| Athletics | 0 | 1 | 0 | 1 |
| Taekwondo | 0 | 1 | 0 | 1 |
| Weightlifting | 3 | 2 | 0 | 5 |
| Wrestling | 4 | 1 | 1 | 6 |
| Total | 7 | 5 | 1 | 13 |

== Competitors ==
| Sport | Men | Women | Total |
|---|---|---|---|
| Archery | 1 | 1 | 2 |
| Athletics | 9 | 1 | 10 |
| Boxing | 4 | 0 | 4 |
| Canoeing | 1 | 1 | 2 |
| Cycling | 3 | 0 | 3 |
| Fencing | 1 | 0 | 1 |
| Judo | 1 | 0 | 1 |
| Rowing | 1 | 1 | 2 |
| Shooting | 1 | 2 | 3 |
| Swimming | 1 | 0 | 1 |
| Table tennis | 1 | 1 | 2 |
| Taekwondo | 2 | 1 | 3 |
| Weightlifting | 6 | 0 | 6 |
| Wrestling | 13 | 0 | 13 |
| Total | 45 | 8 | 53 |

== Archery ==
Two Iranian archers (one man and one woman) qualified for the London Olympics.

| Athlete | Event | Ranking round | | Round of 64 | Round of 32 | Round of 16 | Quarterfinals | Semifinals | Final / BM | |
| Athlete | Event | Score | Seed | Opposition Score | Opposition Score | Opposition Score | Opposition Score | Opposition Score | Opposition Score | Rank |
|---|---|---|---|---|---|---|---|---|---|---|
| Milad Vaziri | Men's individual | 662 | 39 | Vélez (MEX); L 1–7 | Did not advance | | | | | |
| Zahra Dehghan | Women's individual | 614 | 55 | Avitia (MEX); L 2–6 | Did not advance | | | | | |

== Athletics ==
Iranian athletes have so far achieved qualifying standards in the following athletics events (up to a maximum of 3 athletes in each event at the 'A' Standard, and 1 at the 'B' Standard):

Key

- Note–Ranks given for track events are within the athlete's heat only
- Q = Qualified for the next round
- q = Qualified for the next round as a fastest loser or, in field events, by position without achieving the qualifying target
- NR = National record
- N/A = Round not applicable for the event
- Bye = Athlete not required to compete in round

Men
Track & road events

| Athlete | Event | Heat | | Quarterfinal | | Semifinal | | Final | |
| Athlete | Event | Result | Rank | Result | Rank | Result | Rank | Result | Rank |
|---|---|---|---|---|---|---|---|---|---|
| Rouhollah Askari | 110 m hurdles | 13.97 | 7 | —N/a | | Did not advance | | | |
| Reza Ghasemi | 100 m | Bye | | 10.31 | 4 | Did not advance | | | |
| Sajjad Hashemi | 400 m | 47.75 | 6 | —N/a | | Did not advance | | | |
| Sajjad Moradi | 800 m | 1:48.23 | 2 Q | —N/a | | DSQ | | Did not advance | |
| Ebrahim Rahimian | 20 km walk | —N/a | | | | | | DNF | |

Field events

| Athlete | Event | Qualification | | Final | |
| Athlete | Event | Distance | Position | Distance | Position |
|---|---|---|---|---|---|
| Mohammad Arzandeh | Long jump | 7.84 | 17 | Did not advance | |
| Ehsan Haddadi | Discus throw | 65.19 | 6 Q | 68.18 | 2nd place, silver medalist(s) |
| Kaveh Mousavi | Hammer throw | 72.70 | 22 | Did not advance | |
| Amin Nikfar | Shot put | 18.62 | 33 | Did not advance | |

Women
Field events

| Athlete | Event | Qualification | | Final | |
| Athlete | Event | Distance | Position | Distance | Position |
|---|---|---|---|---|---|
| Leila Rajabi | Shot put | 17.55 | 22 | Did not advance | |

== Boxing ==
Iran has so far qualified boxers for the following events.

Men

| Athlete | Event | Round of 32 | Round of 16 | Quarterfinals | Semifinals | Final | |
| Athlete | Event | Opposition Result | Opposition Result | Opposition Result | Opposition Result | Opposition Result | Rank |
|---|---|---|---|---|---|---|---|
| Mehdi Tolouti | Light welterweight | Alonso (ESP); W 16–12 | Yeleussinov (KAZ); L 10–19 | Did not advance | | | |
| Amin Ghasemipour | Welterweight | Maestre (VEN); L 8–13 | Did not advance | | | | |
| Ehsan Rouzbahani | Light heavyweight | Monroy (COL); W 12–10 | Muzaffer (TUR); W 18–12 | Niyazymbetov (KAZ); L 10–13 | Did not advance | | |
| Ali Mazaheri | Heavyweight | —N/a | Larduet (CUB); L DSQ | Did not advance | | | |

== Canoeing ==
=== Sprint ===
Iran has qualified boats for the following events

| Athlete | Event | Heats | | Semifinals | | Final | |
| Athlete | Event | Time | Rank | Time | Rank | Time | Rank |
|---|---|---|---|---|---|---|---|
| Ahmad Reza Talebian | Men's K-1 1000 m | 3:39.504 | 6 | Did not advance | | | |
| Arezoo Hakimi | Women's K-1 200 m | 44.576 | 7 | Did not advance | | | |
| Arezoo Hakimi | Women's K-1 500 m | 1:58.598 | 7 | Did not advance | | | |

Qualification Legend: FA = Qualify to final (medal); FB = Qualify to final B (non-medal)

== Cycling ==
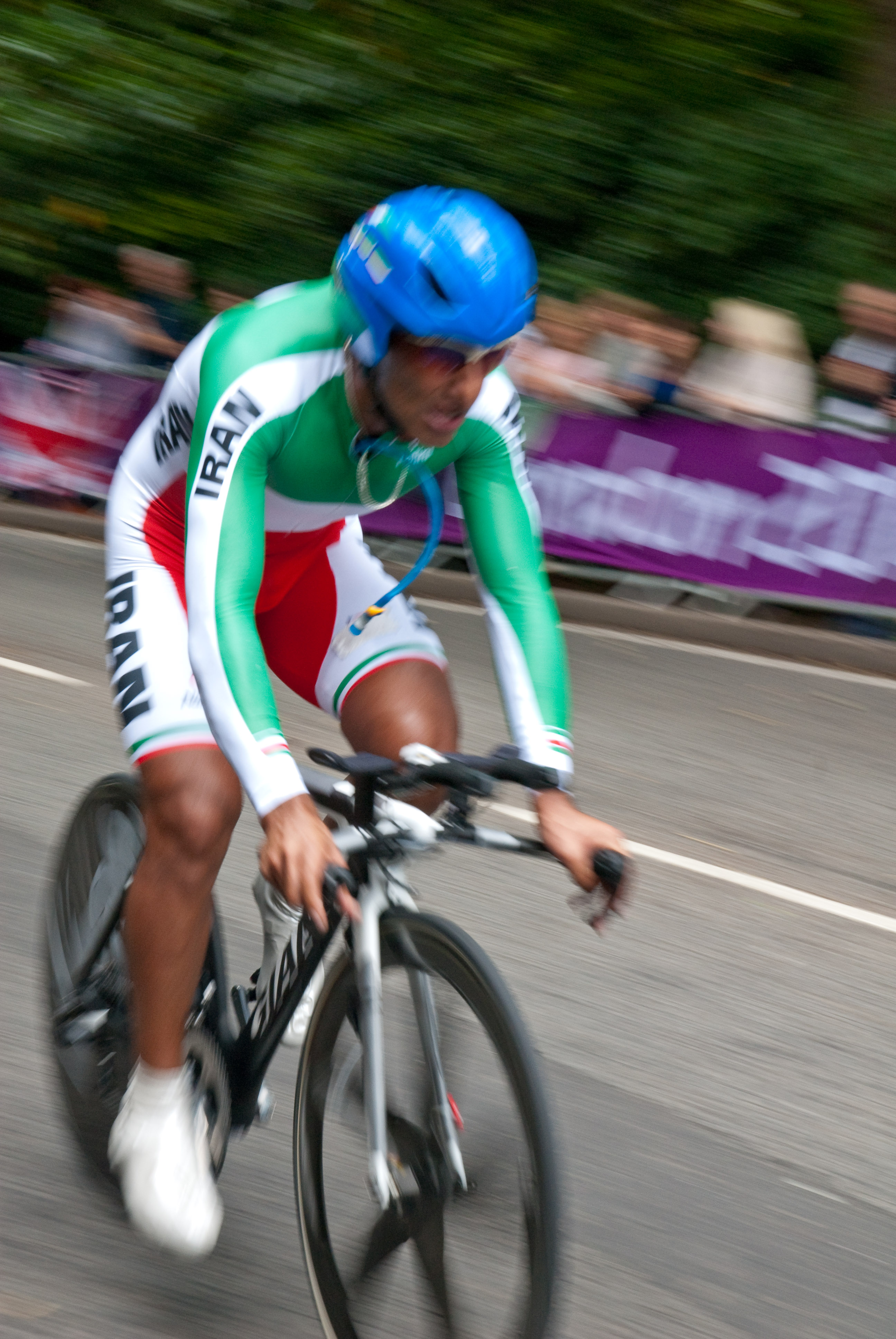
Alireza Haghi in men's time trial.

=== Road ===
| Athlete | Event | Time | Rank |
|---|---|---|---|
| Alireza Haghi | Men's road race | Did not finish | |
| Alireza Haghi | Men's time trial | 57:41.44 | 36 |
| Mehdi Sohrabi | Men's road race | OTL | |
| Amir Zargari | Men's road race | Did not finish | |

== Fencing ==
Men

| Athlete | Event | Round of 64 | Round of 32 | Round of 16 | Quarterfinal | Semifinal | Final / BM | |
| Athlete | Event | Opposition Score | Opposition Score | Opposition Score | Opposition Score | Opposition Score | Opposition Score | Rank |
|---|---|---|---|---|---|---|---|---|
| Mojtaba Abedini | Individual sabre | Zalomir (ROU); L 7–15 | Did not advance | | | | | |

== Judo ==
| Athlete | Event | Round of 32 | Round of 16 | Quarterfinals | Semifinals | Repechage | Final / BM | |
| Athlete | Event | Opposition Result | Opposition Result | Opposition Result | Opposition Result | Opposition Result | Opposition Result | Rank |
|---|---|---|---|---|---|---|---|---|
| Mohammad Reza Roudaki | Men's +100 kg | Malki (MAR); L WO | Did not advance | | | | | |

== Rowing ==
Iran has qualified for the following boats.

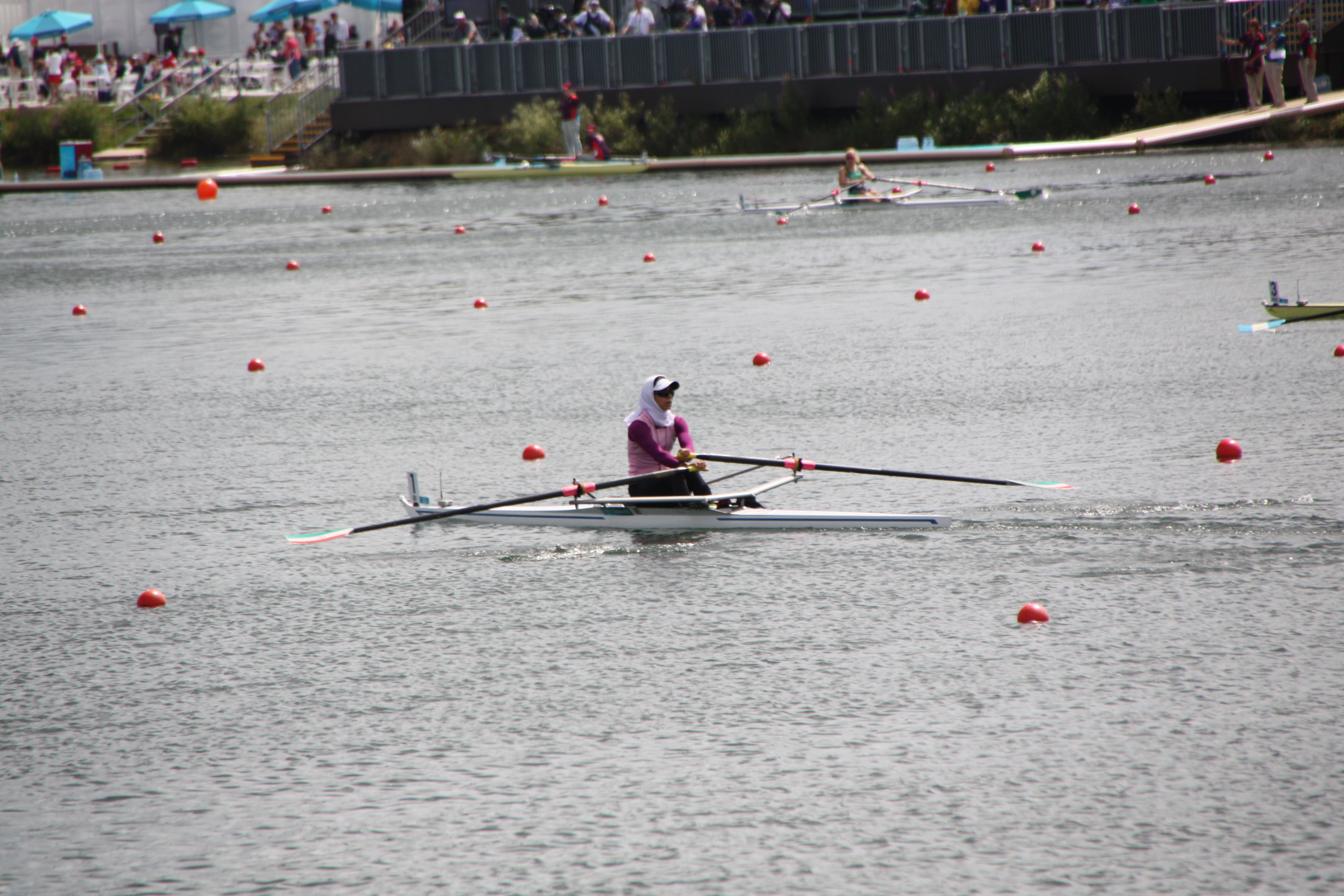
Soulmaz Abbasi paddled her own pace in women's singles sculls.

Men

| Athlete | Event | Heats | | Repechage | | Quarterfinals | | Semifinals | | Final | |
| Athlete | Event | Time | Rank | Time | Rank | Time | Rank | Time | Rank | Time | Rank |
|---|---|---|---|---|---|---|---|---|---|---|---|
| Mohsen Shadi | Single sculls | 7:27.42 | 6 R | 7:11.55 | 2 QF | 7:32.72 | 6 SC/D | 8:20.29 | 6 FD | 7:31.42 | 22 |

Women

| Athlete | Event | Heats | | Repechage | | Quarterfinals | | Semifinals | | Final | |
| Athlete | Event | Time | Rank | Time | Rank | Time | Rank | Time | Rank | Time | Rank |
|---|---|---|---|---|---|---|---|---|---|---|---|
| Soulmaz Abbasi | Single sculls | 8:17.46 | 6 R | 8:05.99 | 2 QF | 8:27.28 | 6 SC/D | 8:30.74 | 6 FD | 8:57.98 | 24 |

Qualification Legend: FA=Final A (medal); FB=Final B (non-medal); FC=Final C (non-medal); FD=Final D (non-medal); FE=Final E (non-medal); FF=Final F (non-medal); SA/B=Semifinals A/B; SC/D=Semifinals C/D; SE/F=Semifinals E/F; QF=Quarterfinals; R=Repechage

== Shooting ==
Iran has qualified three quota places in the shooting events;

Men

| Athlete | Event | Qualification | | Final | |
| Athlete | Event | Points | Rank | Points | Rank |
|---|---|---|---|---|---|
| Ebrahim Barkhordari | 10 m air pistol | 569 | 33 | Did not advance | |
| Ebrahim Barkhordari | 50 m pistol | 552 | 27 | Did not advance | |

Women

| Athlete | Event | Qualification | | Final | |
| Athlete | Event | Points | Rank | Points | Rank |
|---|---|---|---|---|---|
| Elaheh Ahmadi | 10 m air rifle | 397 | 5 Q | 499.1 | 6 |
| Elaheh Ahmadi | 50 m rifle 3 positions | 567 | 43 | Did not advance | |
| Mahlagha Jambozorg | 10 m air rifle | 391 | 43 | Did not advance | |
| Mahlagha Jambozorg | 50 m rifle 3 positions | 581 | 14 | Did not advance | |

== Swimming ==
Iran has selected one swimmer under the Universality rule.

Men

| Athlete | Event | Heat | | Semifinal | | Final | |
| Athlete | Event | Time | Rank | Time | Rank | Time | Rank |
|---|---|---|---|---|---|---|---|
| Mohammad Bidarian | 100 m freestyle | 52.93 | 42 | Did not advance | | | |

== Table tennis ==
Iran has qualified 2 athletes.

| Athlete | Event | Preliminary round | Round 1 | Round 2 | Round 3 | Round 4 | Quarterfinals | Semifinals | Final / BM | |
| Athlete | Event | Opposition Result | Opposition Result | Opposition Result | Opposition Result | Opposition Result | Opposition Result | Opposition Result | Opposition Result | Rank |
|---|---|---|---|---|---|---|---|---|---|---|
| Noshad Alamian | Men's singles | Bye | Han (AUS); W 4–0 | Tang P (HKG); W 4–3 | Boll (GER); L 0–4 | Did not advance | | | | |
| Neda Shahsavari | Women's singles | Oshonaike (NGR); L 3–4 | Did not advance | | | | | | | |

== Taekwondo ==
Iran has qualified two men and one woman.

| Athlete | Event | Round of 16 | Quarterfinals | Semifinals | Repechage | Bronze Medal | Final | |
| Athlete | Event | Opposition Result | Opposition Result | Opposition Result | Opposition Result | Opposition Result | Opposition Result | Rank |
|---|---|---|---|---|---|---|---|---|
| Mohammad Bagheri Motamed | Men's −68 kg | Boui (CAF); W 7–2 | Nikpai (AFG); W 5–4 | Silva (BRA); W 5–5 SUP | Bye | | Tazegül (TUR); L 5–6 | 2nd place, silver medalist(s) |
| Yousef Karami | Men's −80 kg | García (ESP); L 2–8 | Did not advance | | Muhammad (GBR); L 7–11 | Did not advance | | |
| Sousan Hajipour | Women's −67 kg | Marton (AUS); L 4–5 | Did not advance | | | | | |

== Weightlifting ==
Iran has qualified 6 men.

| Athlete | Event | Snatch | | Clean & Jerk | | Total | Rank |
| Athlete | Event | Result | Rank | Result | Rank | Total | Rank |
|---|---|---|---|---|---|---|---|
| Sohrab Moradi | Men's −85 kg | ~~167~~ | DNF | — | — | — | DNF |
| Kianoush Rostami | Men's −85 kg | 171 | 4 | 209 | 3 | 380 | 2nd place, silver medalist(s) |
| Saeid Mohammadpour | Men's −94 kg | 183 | 3 | 219 | 6 | 402 | 1st place, gold medalist(s) |
| Navab Nassirshalal | Men's –105 kg | 184 | =5 | 227 | =1 | 411 | 1st place, gold medalist(s) |
| Sajjad Anoushiravani | Men's +105 kg | 204 | 3 | 245 | 2 | 449 | 2nd place, silver medalist(s) |
| Behdad Salimi | Men's +105 kg | 208 | =1 | 247 | 1 | 455 | 1st place, gold medalist(s) |

== Wrestling ==
Iran has qualified 13 quota places.

Key:

- VT - Victory by Fall.
- PP - Decision by Points - the loser with technical points.
- PO - Decision by Points - the loser without technical points.

Men's freestyle

| Athlete | Event | Qualification | Round of 16 | Quarterfinal | Semifinal | Repechage 1 | Repechage 2 | Final / BM | |
| Athlete | Event | Opposition Result | Opposition Result | Opposition Result | Opposition Result | Opposition Result | Opposition Result | Opposition Result | Rank |
|---|---|---|---|---|---|---|---|---|---|
| Hassan Rahimi | −55 kg | Naranbaatar (MGL); W 3–0 ^{PO} | Kumar (IND); L 1–3 ^{PP} | Did not advance | | | | | 8 |
| Masoud Esmaeilpour | −60 kg | Torres (MEX); W 3–0 ^{PO} | Zhumagaziyev (KAZ); W 3–1 ^{PP} | Kudukhov (RUS); L 1–3 ^{PP} | Did not advance | Bye | Dutt (IND); L 1–3 ^{PP} | Did not advance | 7 |
| Mehdi Taghavi | −66 kg | López (CUB); L 1–3 ^{PP} | Did not advance | | | | | | 14 |
| Sadegh Goudarzi | –74 kg | Bye | Terziev (BUL); W 3–0 ^{PO} | Tigiev (UZB); W 3–0 ^{PO} | Hatos (HUN); W 3–0 ^{PO} | Bye | | Burroughs (USA); L 0–3 ^{PO} | 2nd place, silver medalist(s) |
| Ehsan Lashgari | −84 kg | Baiduashov (KAZ); W 3–0 ^{PO} | Nurmagomedov (ARM); W 5–0 ^{EX} | Urishev (RUS); W 3–0 ^{PO} | Sharifov (AZE); L 1–3 ^{PP} | Bye | | Bölükbaşı (TUR); W 3–0 ^{PO} | 3rd place, bronze medalist(s) |
| Reza Yazdani | −96 kg | Bye | Gadisov (RUS); W 3–1 ^{PP} | Musaev (KGZ); W 3–0 ^{PO} | Andriitsev (UKR); L 0–5 ^{VB} | Bye | | Gazyumov (AZE); L 0–5 ^{VB} | 5 |
| Komeil Ghasemi | −120 kg | Bye | Bhullar (CAN); W 3–0 ^{PO} | Taymazov (UZB); L 0–3 ^{PO} | Did not advance | Bye | Matuhin (GER); W 3–0 ^{PO} | Dlagnev (USA); W 3–0 ^{PO} | 1st place, gold medalist(s) |

Men's Greco-Roman

| Athlete | Event | Qualification | Round of 16 | Quarterfinal | Semifinal | Repechage 1 | Repechage 2 | Final / BM | |
| Athlete | Event | Opposition Result | Opposition Result | Opposition Result | Opposition Result | Opposition Result | Opposition Result | Opposition Result | Rank |
|---|---|---|---|---|---|---|---|---|---|
| Hamid Sourian | −55 kg | Bye | Eraliev (KGZ); W 3–1 ^{PP} | Módos (HUN); W 3–0 ^{PO} | Nyblom (DEN); W 3–0 ^{PO} | Bye | | Bayramov (AZE); W 3–0 ^{PO} | 1st place, gold medalist(s) |
| Omid Norouzi | −60 kg | Sheng J (CHN); W 3–1 ^{PP} | Angelov (BUL); W 3–0 ^{PO} | Kebispayev (KAZ); W 3–0 ^{PO} | Matsumoto (JPN); W 3–0 ^{PO} | Bye | | Lashkhi (GEO); W 3–0 ^{PO} | 1st place, gold medalist(s) |
| Saeid Abdevali | −66 kg | Bye | Yüksel (TUR); W 3–0 ^{PO} | Guénot (FRA); L 0–3 ^{PO} | Did not advance | | | | 11 |
| Habibollah Akhlaghi | −84 kg | Shorey (CUB); L 1–3 ^{PP} | Did not advance | | | | | | 13 |
| Ghasem Rezaei | −96 kg | Bye | İldem (TUR); W 3–1 ^{PP} | Aleksanyan (ARM); W 3–0 ^{PO} | Estrada (CUB); W 3–0 ^{PO} | Bye | | Totrov (RUS); W 3–0 ^{PO} | 1st place, gold medalist(s) |
| Bashir Babajanzadeh | −120 kg | Nadhim (IRQ); W 3–0 ^{PO} | Patrikeyev (ARM); W 3–1 ^{PP} | Eurén (SWE); L 0–3 ^{PO} | Did not advance | | | | 7 |
