= Turkey at the 2012 Summer Olympics =

- IOC code: TUR
- NOC: Turkish National Olympic Committee
- Website: olimpiyat.org.tr (in English and Turkish)

in London
- Competitors: 114 in 16 sports
- Flag bearers: Neslihan Demir Darnel (opening); Servet Tazegül (closing)
- Medals Ranked 46th: Gold 1 Silver 1 Bronze 1 Total 3

Summer Olympics appearances (overview)
- 1908; 1912; 1920; 1924; 1928; 1932; 1936; 1948; 1952; 1956; 1960; 1964; 1968; 1972; 1976; 1980; 1984; 1988; 1992; 1996; 2000; 2004; 2008; 2012; 2016; 2020; 2024

Other related appearances
- 1906 Intercalated Games

Turkey competed at the 2012 Summer Olympics in London, from 27 July to 12 August 2012. The nation has competed in all but three of the Summer Olympic Games in all the modern era since its debut in 1908. Turkey did not attend the 1920 Summer Olympics in Antwerp, the 1932 Summer Olympics in Los Angeles during the worldwide Great Depression, and the 1980 Summer Olympics in Moscow because of its support for the United States boycott. The Turkish Olympic Committee (Turkish: Türkiye Milli Olimpiyat Komitesi, TMOK) sent the nation's largest delegation to the Games. A total of 114 athletes, 48 men and 66 women, competed in 16 sports. For the first time in its Olympic history, Turkey was represented by more female than male athletes. Women's basketball and women's volleyball were the only team-based sports in which Turkey had its representation in these Olympic Games. There was only a single competitor in archery, badminton, and artistic gymnastics.

The Turkish team featured past Olympic medalists, including hammer thrower Eşref Apak, taekwondo jins Bahri Tanrıkulu and Servet Tazegül, who previously won the bronze in Beijing, and freestyle wrestler and defending champion Ramazan Şahin. Backstroke swimmer Derya Büyükuncu became the first Turkish athlete to compete in six Olympic Games. Meanwhile, weightlifter and former Olympic record holder Aylin Daşdelen made her Olympic comeback after an eight-year absence. Volleyball player Neslihan Demir Darnel, who led her national team by winning the European qualification tournament, became Turkey's first female flag bearer at the opening ceremony.

Turkey left London with a total of three Olympic medals (: one gold, one silver, and one bronze), the lowest in Turkey's Summer Olympic history since 1988. Two of these medals were awarded to the team in taekwondo and one in wrestling. Among the nation's medalists were the taekwondo jin Servet Tazegül, who won Turkey's first Olympic gold medal in this discipline. For the first time since 1984, Turkey did not win an Olympic medal in weightlifting.

== Medalists ==
Main article: 2012 Summer Olympics medal table

Medal	Name	Sport	Event	Date
Gold	Servet Tazegül	Taekwondo	Men's 68 kg	9 August
~~Gold~~	~~Aslı Çakır Alptekin~~	~~Athletics~~	~~Women's 1500 m~~	10 August
~~Silver~~	~~Gamze Bulut~~	~~Athletics~~	~~Women's 1500 m~~	10 August
Silver	Nur Tatar	Taekwondo	Women's 67 kg	10 August
Bronze	Rıza Kayaalp	Wrestling	Men's 120 kg	6 August

^{a} On 17 August 2015, the Court of Arbitration for Sport says it approved a settlement agreed to by Turkish athlete Aslı Çakır Alptekin and the IAAF. Alptekin has agreed to forfeit her 1500 metres Olympic title and serve an eight-year ban for blood doping. IOC has not yet confirmed the redistribution of the medals in this event.

Medals by sport
Sport	1st place, gold medalist(s)	2nd place, silver medalist(s)	3rd place, bronze medalist(s)	Total
Taekwondo	1	1	0	2
Wrestling	0	0	1	1
Total	1	1	1	3

== Competitors ==
Sport	Men	Women	Total
Archery	0	1	1
Athletics	8	25	33
Badminton	0	1	1
Basketball	0	12	12
Boxing	6	0	6
Cycling	3	0	3
Gymnastics	0	1	1
Judo	1	1	2
Sailing	4	1	5
Shooting	3	2	5
Swimming	3	3	6
Table tennis	1	1	2
Taekwondo	2	1	3
Volleyball	0	12	12
Weightlifting	5	4	9
Wrestling	12	1	13
Total	48	66	114

== Archery ==
Turkey has qualified one archer for the women's individual event

Athlete	Event	Ranking round		Round of 64	Round of 32	Round of 16	Quarterfinals	Semifinals	Final / BM	
Athlete	Event	Score	Seed	Opposition Score	Opposition Score	Opposition Score	Opposition Score	Opposition Score	Opposition Score	Rank
Begül Löklüoğlu	Women's individual	648	26	Le C-y (TPE) (39); L 0–6	Did not advance					

== Athletics ==
Turkish athletes have so far achieved qualifying standards in the following athletics events (up to a maximum of 3 athletes in each event at the 'A' Standard, and 1 at the 'B' Standard):

Key

- Note–Ranks given for track events are within the athlete's heat only
- Q = Qualified for the next round
- q = Qualified for the next round as a fastest loser or, in field events, by position without achieving the qualifying target
- NR = National record
- N/A = Round not applicable for the event
- Bye = Athlete not required to compete in round

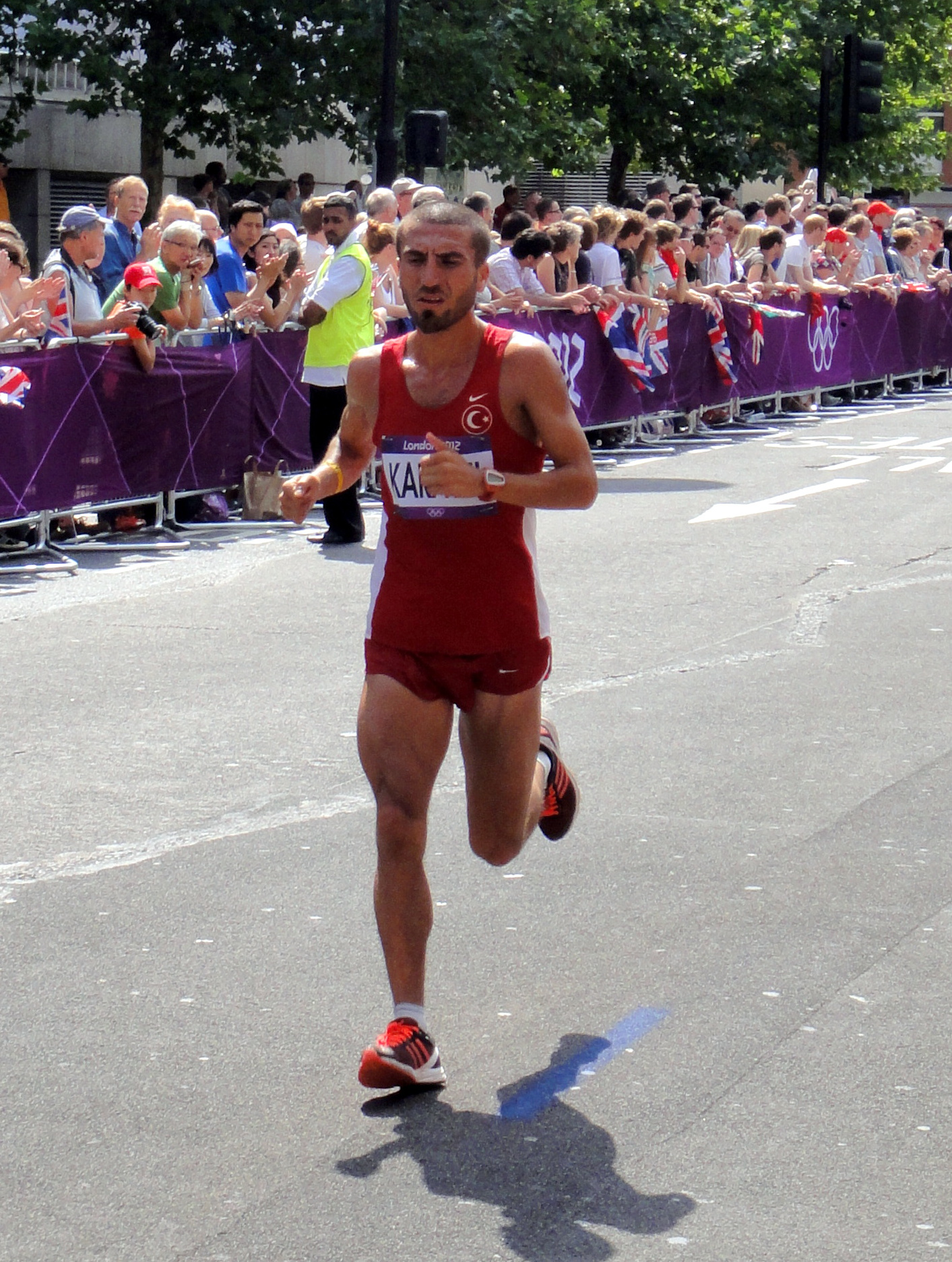
Bekir Karayel in men's marathon

Men
Track & road events

Athlete	Event	Heat		Semifinal		Final	
Athlete	Event	Result	Rank	Result	Rank	Result	Rank
İlham Tanui Özbilen	1500 m	3:39.70	3 Q	3:35.18	6 q	3:36.72	8
Polat Kemboi Arıkan	5000 m	13:27.21	13	—N/a		Did not advance	
Polat Kemboi Arıkan	10000 m	—N/a				27:38.81	9
Tarık Langat Akdağ	3000 m steeplechase	8:17.85	4 Q	—N/a		8:27.64	9
Bekir Karayel	Marathon	—N/a				2:29:38	76

Field events

Athlete	Event	Qualification		Final	
Athlete	Event	Distance	Position	Distance	Position
Hüseyin Atıcı	Shot put	19.74	20	Did not advance	
Ercüment Olgundeniz	Discus throw	60.87	23	Did not advance	
Fatih Avan	Javelin throw	78.87	20	Did not advance	
Eşref Apak	Hammer throw	73.47	17	Did not advance	

Women
Track & road events

Athlete	Event	Heat		Quarterfinal		Semifinal		Final	
Athlete	Event	Result	Rank	Result	Rank	Result	Rank	Result	Rank
Nimet Karakuş	100 m	Bye		11.62	6	Did not advance			
Pınar Saka	400 m	52.38	4	—N/a		Did not advance			
Merve Aydın	800 m	3:24.35	7	—N/a		Did not advance			
Aslı Çakır Alptekin	1500 m	4:13.64	3 Q	—N/a		4:05.11	1 Q	4:10.23	Disqualified
Gamze Bulut	1500 m	4:06.69	1 Q	—N/a		4:01.18	2 Q	4:10.40	Disqualified
Tuğba Karakaya	1500 m	4:29.21	15	—N/a		Did not advance			
Dudu Karakaya	5000 m	15:28.32	14	—N/a				Did not advance	
Nevin Yanıt	100 m hurdles	12.70	1 Q	—N/a		12.58 NR	2 Q	12.58 NR	Disqualified
Nagihan Karadere	400 m hurdles	DSQ		—N/a		Did not advance			
Özlem Kaya	3000 m steeplechase	10:03.52	13	—N/a				Did not advance	
Gülcan Mıngır	3000 m steeplechase	9:47.35	10	—N/a				Did not advance	
Binnaz Uslu	3000 m steeplechase	10:31.00	15	—N/a				Did not advance	
Özge Akın; Sema Apak; Birsen Engin; Meliz Redif; Pınar Saka; Elif Yıldırım	4 × 400 m relay	3:34.71	8	—N/a				Did not advance	
Bahar Doğan	Marathon	—N/a						2:36:35	63
Sultan Haydar	Marathon	—N/a						2:38:26	72
Ümmü Kiraz	Marathon	—N/a						2:43:07	89
Semiha Mutlu	20 km walk	—N/a						1:35:33	47

Field events

Athlete	Event	Qualification		Final	
Athlete	Event	Distance	Position	Distance	Position
Karin Melis Mey	Long jump	6.80	3 Q	DNS	
Burcu Ayhan	High jump	1.93	9 q	1.89	12
Kıvılcım Kaya	Hammer throw	69.50	15	Did not advance	
Tuğçe Şahutoğlu	Hammer throw	67.58	24	Did not advance	

== Badminton ==
Athlete	Event	Group Stage			Elimination	Quarterfinal	Semifinal	Final / BM	
Athlete	Event	Opposition Score	Opposition Score	Rank	Opposition Score	Opposition Score	Opposition Score	Opposition Score	Rank
Neslihan Yiğit	Women's singles	Prutsch (AUT); W 21–18, 21–10	Cheng S-c (TPE); L 10–21, 6–21	2	Did not advance				

== Basketball ==
Turkey has qualified a women's team.

- Women's team event - 1 team of 12 players

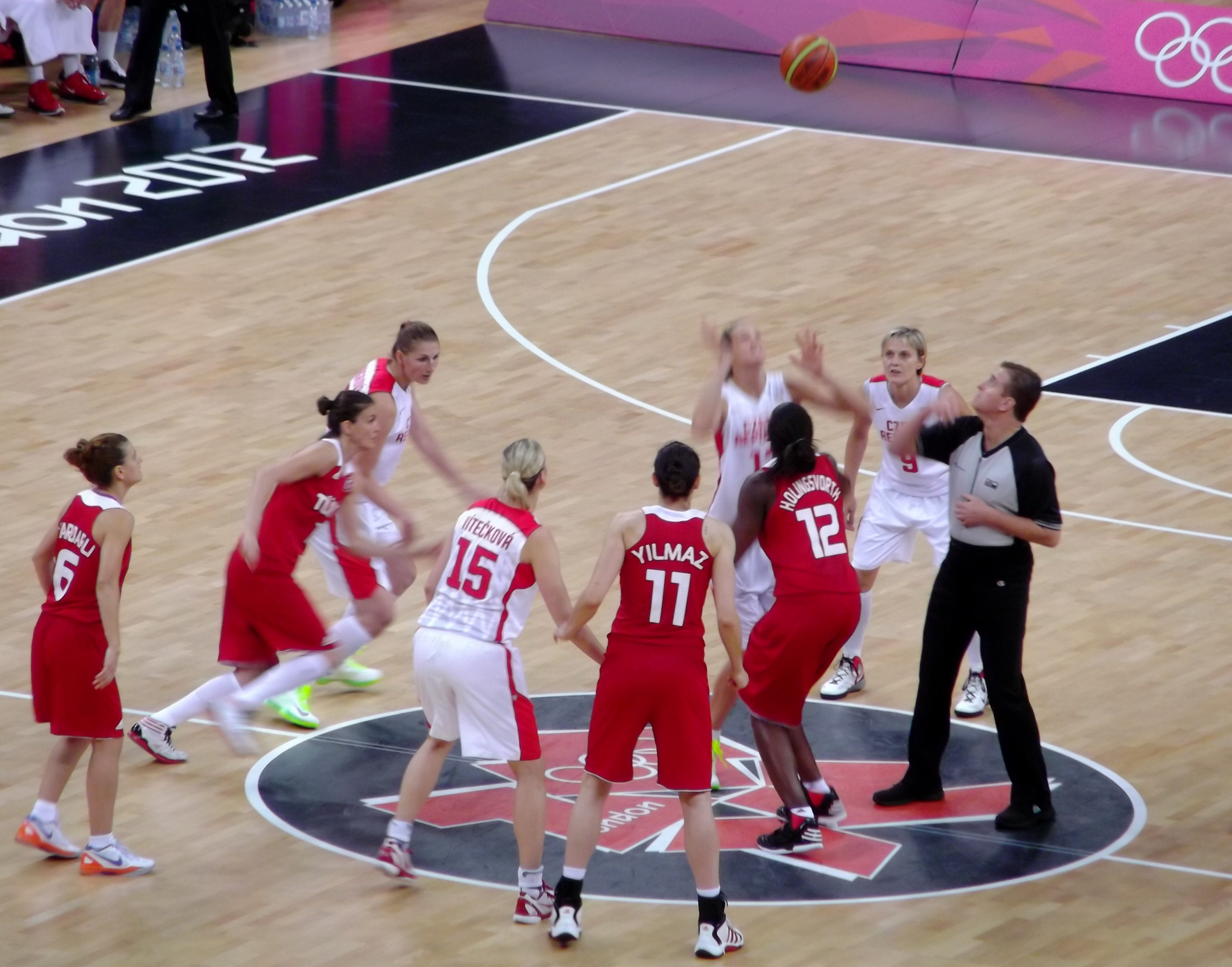
Czech Republic vs. Turkey in women's basketball.

=== Women's tournament ===
Roster

The following is the Turkey roster in the women's basketball tournament of the 2012 Summer Olympics.

Turkey women's national basketball team – 2012 Summer Olympics roster
Players
Coaches

Pos.	No.	Name	Age – Date of birth	Height	Club	Ctr.
G	4	Tuğba Palazoğlu	31 – 4 December 1980	1.72 m (5 ft 8 in)	Mersin BB	(Turkey)
F	5	Begüm Dalgalar	24 – 8 June 1988	1.8 m (5 ft 11 in)	Kayseri Kaski	(Turkey)
G	6	Birsel Vardarlı	28 – 12 July 1984	1.74 m (5 ft 9 in)	Fenerbahçe	(Turkey)
G	7	Nilay Kartaltepe	33 – 13 January 1979	1.70 m (5 ft 7 in)	Botaş SK	(Turkey)
F	8	Tuğçe Canıtez	21 – 10 November 1990	1.75 m (5 ft 9 in)	Westmont College	(United States)
G	9	Esmeral Tunçluer	32 – 7 June 1980	1.75 m (5 ft 9 in)	Fenerbahçe	(Turkey)
G	10	Işıl Alben	26 – 22 February 1986	1.72 m (5 ft 8 in)	Galatasaray Medical Park	(Turkey)
C	11	Nevriye Yılmaz	32 – 16 June 1980	1.94 m (6 ft 4 in)	Fenerbahçe	(Turkey)
C	12	Kuanitra Hollingsworth	23 – 15 November 1988	1.96 m (6 ft 5 in)	UMMC Ekaterinburg	(Russia)
F	13	Yasemin Horasan	28 – 1 August 1983	1.88 m (6 ft 2 in)	Beşiktaş	(Turkey)
F	14	Şaziye İvegin	30 – 8 February 1982	1.80 m (5 ft 11 in)	Galatasaray Medical Park	(Turkey)
F	15	Bahar Çağlar	23 – 28 September 1988	1.90 m (6 ft 3 in)	Galatasaray Medical Park	(Turkey)

Head coach

- (Turkey) Ceyhun Yıldızoğlu

Legend

- Club – describes last
  club before the tournament
- Age – describes age
  on 28 July 2012

Group play

Pos	Team	Pld	W	L	PF	PA	PD	Pts	Qualification
1	United States	5	5	0	462	279	+183	10	Quarterfinals
2	Turkey	5	4	1	343	316	+27	9	Quarterfinals
3	China	5	3	2	346	363	−17	8	Quarterfinals
4	Czech Republic	5	2	3	346	332	+14	7	Quarterfinals
5	Croatia	5	1	4	324	379	−55	6	
6	Angola	5	0	5	243	395	−152	5	

Source: FIBA archive
Rules for classification: 1) points; 2) head-to-head points; 3) head-to-head goal average; 4) head-to-head number of points scored.

28 July 2012
14:30

Report

Turkey	72–50	Angola
Scoring by quarter: 21–8, 14–17, 23–14, 14–11
Pts: Palazoğlu 13; Rebs: Çağlar 7 Asts: Vardarlı 5		Pts: Mauricio 11; Rebs: Tomas, Manuel 5 Asts: Camufal 2

Basketball Arena, London
Referees: Elena Chernova (RUS), Vitalis Gode (KEN), Fernando Sampietro (ARG)

30 July 2012
11:15

Report

Czech Republic	57–61	Turkey
Scoring by quarter: 8–13, 13–20, 18–12, 18–16
Pts: Veselá 19; Rebs: three players 6 Asts: Bartoňová, Elhotová 4		Pts: three players 11; Rebs: Yılmaz 13; Asts: Vardarlı 4

Basketball Arena, London
Referees: Pablo Estévez (ARG), Shoko Sugruro (JPN), Samir Abaakil (MAR)

1 August 2012
22:15

Report

United States	89–58	Turkey
Scoring by quarter: 19–16, 22–10, 22–21, 26–11
Pts: McCoughtry 18; Rebs: three players 7 Asts: Bird 4		Pts: Vardarlı, Hollingsworth 11; Rebs: Hollingsworth 8 Asts: Vardarlı, Alben 3

Basketball Arena, London
Referees: Michael Aylen (AUS), Stephen Seibel (CAN), Peng Ling (CHN)

3 August 2012
16:45

Report

Turkey	82–55	China
Scoring by quarter: 26–13, 13–14, 20–16, 23–12
Pts: Yılmaz 16; Rebs: Hollingsworth 11; Asts: Alben 5		Pts: Ma Zengyu 7 Rebs: Ma Zengyu, Chen Nan 8 Asts: Miao Lijie 6

Basketball Arena, London
Referees: Carl Jungebrand (FIN), Felicia Grinter (USA), Vaughan Mayberry (AUS)

5 August 2012
20:00

Report

Croatia	65–70	Turkey
Scoring by quarter: 24–18, 7–15, 13–25, 21–12
Pts: Lelas 14; Rebs: Lelas, Mandir 6 Asts: Lelas 5		Pts: Hollingsworth 14; Rebs: Yılmaz 9 Asts: Tunçluer, Vardarlı 5

Basketball Arena, London
Referees: Jorge Vázquez (PUR), Marcos Benito (BRA), Elena Chernova (RUS)

Quarter-final

7 August 2012
20:00

Report

Turkey	63–66	Russia
Scoring by quarter: 16–23, 12–11, 23–17, 12–15
Pts: Hollingsworth 22; Rebs: Alben 6 Asts: Vardarlı 6		Pts: Hammon 19; Rebs: Petrakova 7 Asts: Hammon 5

Basketball Arena, London
Referees: José Carrion (PUR), William Kennedy (USA), Peng Ling (CHN)

== Boxing ==
Men

Athlete	Event	Round of 32	Round of 16	Quarterfinals	Semifinals	Final	
Athlete	Event	Opposition Result	Opposition Result	Opposition Result	Opposition Result	Opposition Result	Rank
Ferhat Pehlivan	Light flyweight	Suárez (TRI); W 16–6	El-Awadi (EGY); W 20–6	Ayrapetyan (RUS); L 11–19	Did not advance		
Selçuk Eker	Flyweight	Butdee (THA); L 10–24	Did not advance				
Fatih Keleş	Lightweight	Chadi (ALG); W 15–8	Petrauskas (LTU); L 12–16	Did not advance			
Yakup Şener	Light welterweight	Ambomo (CMR); W 19–10	Rahmonov (UZB); L 8–16	Did not advance			
Adem Kılıççı	Middleweight	Pazzyýew (TKM); W 14–7	Drenovak (SRB); W 20–11	Murata (JPN); L 13–17	Did not advance		
Bahram Muzaffer	Light heavyweight	Bye	Rouzbahani (IRI); L 12–18	Did not advance			

== Cycling ==
=== Road ===
Athlete	Event	Time	Rank
Miraç Kal	Men's road race	Did not finish	
Ahmet Akdilek	Men's road race	OTL	
Ahmet Akdilek	Men's time trial	59:11.19	37
Kemal Küçükbay	Men's road race	Did not finish	

== Gymnastics ==
=== Artistic ===
Women

Athlete	Event	Qualification						Final					
Athlete	Event	Apparatus				Total	Rank	Apparatus				Total	Rank
Athlete	Event	F	V	UB	BB	Total	Rank	F	V	UB	BB	Total	Rank
Göksu Üçtaş	Balance beam	—N/a			11.333	11.333	77	Did not advance					

== Judo ==
Athlete	Event	Round of 64	Round of 32	Round of 16	Quarterfinals	Semifinals	Repechage	Final / BM	
Athlete	Event	Opposition Result	Opposition Result	Opposition Result	Opposition Result	Opposition Result	Opposition Result	Opposition Result	Rank
Sezer Huysuz	Men's −73 kg	Bye	Palelashvili (ISR); L 0000–0010	Did not advance					
Gülşah Kocatürk	Women's +78 kg	—N/a	Bye	Kindzerska (UKR); L 0002–0103	Did not advance				

== Sailing ==
Men

Athlete	Event	Race											Net points	Final rank
Athlete	Event	1	2	3	4	5	6	7	8	9	10	M*	Net points	Final rank
Mustafa Çakır	Laser	43	29	41	~~50~~	37	35	44	19	50	27	EL	325	39
Alican Kaynar	Finn	18	14	18	18	~~25~~	14	11	22	16	20	EL	154	18
Ateş Çınar (c); Deniz Çınar (s)	470	10	23	~~26~~	18	22	21	23	16	19	26	EL	178	24

Women

Athlete	Event	Race											Net points	Final rank
Athlete	Event	1	2	3	4	5	6	7	8	9	10	M*	Net points	Final rank
Nazlı Çağla Dönertaş	Laser Radial	19	35	16	30	22	38	20	32	~~DSQ~~	20	EL	232	29

M = Medal race; EL = Eliminated – did not advance into the medal race;

== Shooting ==
Men

Athlete	Event	Qualification		Final	
Athlete	Event	Points	Rank	Points	Rank
Yusuf Dikeç	50 m pistol	559	13	Did not advance	
Yusuf Dikeç	10 m air pistol	575	27	Did not advance	
İsmail Keleş	50 m pistol	559	12	Did not advance	
İsmail Keleş	10 m air pistol	575	24	Did not advance	
Oğuzhan Tüzün	Trap	117	24	Did not advance	

Women

Athlete	Event	Qualification		Final	
Athlete	Event	Points	Rank	Points	Rank
Nihan Kantarcı	Trap	66	13	Did not advance	
Çiğdem Özyaman	Skeet	63	13	Did not advance	

== Swimming ==
Men

Athlete	Event	Heat		Semifinal		Final	
Athlete	Event	Time	Rank	Time	Rank	Time	Rank
Derya Büyükuncu	200 m backstroke	2:01.68	33	Did not advance			
Kemal Arda Gürdal	100 m freestyle	49.71	27	Did not advance			
Ediz Yıldırımer	1500 m freestyle	15:29.97	26	—N/a		Did not advance	

Women

Athlete	Event	Heat		Semifinal		Final	
Athlete	Event	Time	Rank	Time	Rank	Time	Rank
Burcu Dolunay	50 m freestyle	25.72	34	Did not advance			
Burcu Dolunay	100 m freestyle	55.35	22	Did not advance			
Dilara Buse Günaydın	100 m breaststroke	1:09.43	29	Did not advance			
Dilara Buse Günaydın	200 m breaststroke	2:30.64	30	Did not advance			
Hazal Sarıkaya	100 m backstroke	1:04.80	40	Did not advance			

== Table tennis ==
Athlete	Event	Preliminary round	Round 1	Round 2	Round 3	Round 4	Quarterfinals	Semifinals	Final / BM	
Athlete	Event	Opposition Result	Opposition Result	Opposition Result	Opposition Result	Opposition Result	Opposition Result	Opposition Result	Opposition Result	Rank
Bora Vang	Men's singles	Bye		Aruna (NGR); W 4–2	Zhang J (CHN); L 0-4	Did not advance				
Melek Hu	Women's singles	Bye	Zhang M (CAN); L 3–4	Did not advance						

== Taekwondo ==
Athlete	Event	Round of 16	Quarterfinals	Semifinals	Repechage	Bronze Medal	Final	
Athlete	Event	Opposition Result	Opposition Result	Opposition Result	Opposition Result	Opposition Result	Opposition Result	Rank
Servet Tazegül	Men's −68 kg	Jennings (USA); W 8–6	Husarov (UKR); W 9–2	Stamper (GBR); W 9–6	Bye		Bagheri (IRI); W 6–5	1st place, gold medalist(s)
Bahri Tanrıkulu	Men's +80 kg	Nikolaidis (GRE); W 7–3	Cha D-M (KOR); W 4–1	Obame (GAB); L 2–3	Bye	Liu Xb (CHN); L 2–3	Did not advance	5
Nur Tatar	Women's −67 kg	St. Bernard (GRN); W 5–1	McPherson (USA); W 6–1	Marton (AUS); W 6–0	Bye		Hwang K-S (KOR); L 5–12	2nd place, silver medalist(s)

== Volleyball ==
- Women's indoor event – 1 team of 12 players

=== Women's indoor tournament ===
Team roster

The following is the Turkish roster in the women's volleyball tournament of the 2012 Summer Olympics.

Head coach: (Brazil) Marco Aurelio Motta

№	Name	Date of birth	Height	Weight	Spike	Block	2012 club
2	Gülden Kayalar (L)	5 December 1980	1.67 m (5 ft 6 in)	57 kg (126 lb)	281 cm (111 in)	275 cm (108 in)	(Turkey) Eczacıbaşı
3	Gizem Güreşen (L)	14 January 1987	1.78 m (5 ft 10 in)	70 kg (150 lb)	250 cm (98 in)	270 cm (110 in)	(Turkey) VakıfBank
6	Polen Uslupehlivan	27 August 1990	1.91 m (6 ft 3 in)	65 kg (143 lb)	308 cm (121 in)	300 cm (120 in)	(Turkey) Nilüfer Belediyespor
8	Bahar Toksoy	6 February 1988	1.88 m (6 ft 2 in)	68 kg (150 lb)	315 cm (124 in)	305 cm (120 in)	(Turkey) VakıfBank
9	Özge Kırdar	26 June 1985	1.78 m (5 ft 10 in)	70 kg (150 lb)	310 cm (120 in)	300 cm (120 in)	(Turkey) VakıfBank
10	Gözde Kırdar	26 June 1985	1.81 m (5 ft 11 in)	70 kg (150 lb)	297 cm (117 in)	292 cm (115 in)	(Turkey) VakıfBank
11	Naz Aydemir	14 August 1990	1.82 m (6 ft 0 in)	68 kg (150 lb)	304 cm (120 in)	300 cm (120 in)	(Turkey) Fenerbahçe
12	Esra Gümüş (c)	2 October 1982	1.78 m (5 ft 10 in)	76 kg (168 lb)	305 cm (120 in)	297 cm (117 in)	(Turkey) Eczacıbaşı
13	Neriman Özsoy	13 July 1988	1.84 m (6 ft 0 in)	76 kg (168 lb)	310 cm (120 in)	291 cm (115 in)	(Russia) Dinamo Krasnodar
14	Eda Erdem	22 June 1987	1.88 m (6 ft 2 in)	75 kg (165 lb)	308 cm (121 in)	302 cm (119 in)	(Turkey) Fenerbahçe
17	Neslihan Demir Darnel	9 December 1983	1.85 m (6 ft 1 in)	72 kg (159 lb)	315 cm (124 in)	306 cm (120 in)	(Turkey) Eczacıbaşı
20	Büşra Cansu	16 July 1990	1.85 m (6 ft 1 in)	80 kg (180 lb)	296 cm (117 in)	285 cm (112 in)	(Turkey) Eczacıbaşı

Group play

Pos	Team	Pld	W	L	Pts	SW	SL	SR	SPW	SPL	SPR	Qualification
1	United States	5	5	0	15	15	2	7.500	426	345	1.235	Quarter-finals
2	China	5	3	2	9	11	10	1.100	475	461	1.030	Quarter-finals
3	South Korea	5	2	3	8	11	10	1.100	449	452	0.993	Quarter-finals
4	Brazil	5	3	2	7	10	10	1.000	447	420	1.064	Quarter-finals
5	Turkey	5	2	3	6	9	11	0.818	434	443	0.980	
6	Serbia	5	0	5	0	2	15	0.133	297	407	0.730	

28 July 2012; 22:00	Brazil	3–2	Turkey	Earls Court Exhibition Centre, London; Attendance: 8,000; Referees: Andrey Zenovich (RUS), Mitchell Davidson (CAN)
28 July 2012; 22:00	(25–18, 23–25, 25–19, 25–27, 15–12) result statistics			Earls Court Exhibition Centre, London; Attendance: 8,000; Referees: Andrey Zenovich (RUS), Mitchell Davidson (CAN)

30 July 2012; 09:30	China	3–1	Turkey	Earls Court Exhibition Centre, London; Attendance: 10,500; Referees: Frans Loderus (NED), Mohamed Shaaban (EGY)
30 July 2012; 09:30	(25–20, 25–20, 29–31, 25–22) result statistics			Earls Court Exhibition Centre, London; Attendance: 10,500; Referees: Frans Loderus (NED), Mohamed Shaaban (EGY)

1 August 2012; 14:45	Serbia	0–3	Turkey	Earls Court Exhibition Centre, London; Attendance: 11,500; Referees: Susana Rodriguez (ESP), Simone Santi (ITA)
1 August 2012; 14:45	(20–25, 12–25, 21–25) result statistics			Earls Court Exhibition Centre, London; Attendance: 11,500; Referees: Susana Rodriguez (ESP), Simone Santi (ITA)

3 August 2012; 14:45	Turkey	3–2	South Korea	Earls Court Exhibition Centre, London; Attendance: 13,500; Referees: Simone Santi (ITA), Brian McDougall (GBR)
3 August 2012; 14:45	(25–16, 21–25, 25–18, 19–25, 15–12) result statistics			Earls Court Exhibition Centre, London; Attendance: 13,500; Referees: Simone Santi (ITA), Brian McDougall (GBR)

5 August 2012; 20:00	United States	3–0	Turkey	Earls Court Exhibition Centre, London; Attendance: 12,000; Referees: Susana Rodriguez (ESP), Ibrahim Al-Naama (QAT)
5 August 2012; 20:00	(27–25, 25–16, 25–19) result statistics			Earls Court Exhibition Centre, London; Attendance: 12,000; Referees: Susana Rodriguez (ESP), Ibrahim Al-Naama (QAT)

== Weightlifting ==
Men

Athlete	Event	Snatch		Clean & Jerk		Total	Rank
Athlete	Event	Result	Rank	Result	Rank	Total	Rank
Hurşit Atak	−62 kg	130	8	172	4	302	5
Erol Bilgin	−62 kg	135	6	165	7	300	8
Mete Binay	−69 kg	150	3	175	8	325	6
Bünyamin Sezer	−69 kg	130	17	145	18	275	18
Nezir Sağır	−85 kg	140	15	175	16	315	16

Women

Athlete	Event	Snatch		Clean & Jerk		Total	Rank
Athlete	Event	Result	Rank	Result	Rank	Total	Rank
Nurdan Karagöz	−48 kg	83	3	104	5	187	5
Aylin Daşdelen	−53 kg	91	6	~~124~~	DNF	91	DNF
Bediha Tunadağı	−58 kg	87	16	107	14	194	15
Sibel Şimşek	−63 kg	105	3	130	4	235	4

== Wrestling ==
Key:

- VT - Victory by Fall.
- PP - Decision by Points - the loser with technical points.
- PO - Decision by Points - the loser without technical points.

Men's freestyle

Athlete	Event	Qualification	Round of 16	Quarterfinal	Semifinal	Repechage 1	Repechage 2	Final / BM	
Athlete	Event	Opposition Result	Opposition Result	Opposition Result	Opposition Result	Opposition Result	Opposition Result	Opposition Result	Rank
Ahmet Peker	−55 kg	Bye	Tremblay (CAN); W 3–1 ^{PP}	Niyazbekov (KAZ); L 1–3 ^{PP}	Did not advance				9
Ramazan Şahin	−66 kg	Bye	Kumar (IND); L 1–3 ^{PP}	Did not advance		Bye	Navruzov (UZB); W 3–1 ^{PP}	Tanatarov (KAZ); L 1–3 ^{PP}	5
İbrahim Bölükbaşı	−84 kg	Bye	Sharifov (AZE); L 1–3 ^{PP}	Did not advance		Bye	Herbert (USA); W 3–1 ^{PP}	Lashgari (IRI); L 1–3 ^{PP}	5
Serhat Balcı	−96 kg	Musaev (KGZ); L 1–3 ^{PP}	Did not advance						16
Taha Akgül	−120 kg	Khotsianivskyi (UKR); W 3–0 ^{PO}	Makhov (RUS); L 0–3 ^{PO}	Did not advance					9

Men's Greco-Roman

Athlete	Event	Qualification	Round of 16	Quarterfinal	Semifinal	Repechage 1	Repechage 2	Final / BM	
Athlete	Event	Opposition Result	Opposition Result	Opposition Result	Opposition Result	Opposition Result	Opposition Result	Opposition Result	Rank
Ayhan Karakuş	−55 kg	Bye	Balart (CUB); L 0–3 ^{PO}	Did not advance					16
Rahman Bilici	−60 kg	Bye	Matsumoto (JPN); L 0–3 ^{PO}	Did not advance					17
Atakan Yüksel	−66 kg	Bye	Abdevali (IRI); L 0–3 ^{PO}	Did not advance					18
Selçuk Çebi	−74 kg	Bye	Rosengren (SWE); L 1–3 ^{PP}	Did not advance					13
Nazmi Avluca	−84 kg	Janikowski (POL); L 0–3 ^{PO}	Did not advance						15
Cenk İldem	−96 kg	Bye	Rezaei (IRI); L 1–3 ^{PP}	Did not advance		Bye	Aleksanyan (ARM); L 0–3 ^{PO}	Did not advance	11
Rıza Kayaalp	−120 kg	Bye	Orlov (UKR); W 3–0 ^{PO}	Byers (USA); W 3–0 ^{PO}	López (CUB); L 0–3 ^{PO}	Bye		Pherselidze (GEO); W 3–0 ^{PO}	3rd place, bronze medalist(s)

Women's freestyle

Athlete	Event	Qualification	Round of 16	Quarterfinal	Semifinal	Repechage 1	Repechage 2	Final / BM	
Athlete	Event	Opposition Result	Opposition Result	Opposition Result	Opposition Result	Opposition Result	Opposition Result	Opposition Result	Rank
Elif Jale Yeşilırmak	−63 kg	Dugrenier (CAN); L 0–5 ^{VT}	Did not advance						16
