= Wrestling at the 2010 Asian Games – Men's Greco-Roman 60 kg =

Men's Greco-Roman 60 kg at the 2010 Asian Games
- Venue: Huagong Gymnasium
- Date: 21 November 2010
- Competitors: 12 from 12 nations

Medalists
| gold medal | Omid Norouzi | Iran |
| silver medal | Jung Ji-hyun | South Korea |
| bronze medal | Ravinder Singh | India |
| bronze medal | Ryutaro Matsumoto | Japan |

The men's Greco-Roman 60 kilograms wrestling competition at the 2010 Asian Games in Guangzhou was held on 21 November 2010 at the Huagong Gymnasium.

This Greco-Roman wrestling competition consisted of a single-elimination tournament, with a repechage used to determine the winner of two bronze medals. The two finalists faced off for gold and silver medals. Each wrestler who lost to one of the two finalists moved into the repechage, culminating in a pair of bronze medal matches featuring the semifinal losers each facing the remaining repechage opponent from their half of the bracket.

Each bout consisted of up to three rounds, lasting two minutes apiece. The wrestler who scored more points in each round was the winner of that rounds; the bout finished when one wrestler had won two rounds (and thus the match).

== Schedule ==
All times are China Standard Time (UTC+08:00)

| Date | Time | Event |
|---|---|---|
| Sunday, 21 November 2010 | 09:30 | 1/8 finals |
| Sunday, 21 November 2010 | 09:30 | Quarterfinals |
| Sunday, 21 November 2010 | 09:30 | Semifinals |
| Sunday, 21 November 2010 | 16:00 | Repechages |
| Sunday, 21 November 2010 | 17:00 | Finals |

== Results ==
=== Main bracket ===
1/8 finals
Tạ Ngọc Tân (VIE) | 0 | 0
Ri Kwang-il (PRK) | 3 | 6
Agamyrat Orazsähedow (TKM) | 0 | 0
Sanjarbek Jumashev (UZB) | 1 | 6
Ryutaro Matsumoto (JPN) | 0 | 0
Omid Norouzi (IRI) | 6 | 2
Xie Zhen (CHN) | 2 | 1
Aziz Beishaliev (KGZ) | 0 | 0

Quarterfinals
Ravinder Singh (IND) | 0 | 1 | 3
Nurbakyt Tengizbayev (KAZ) | 2 | 1 | 0
Muhammad Aliansyah (INA) | 0 | 0
Jung Ji-hyun (KOR) | 1 | 4
Ri Kwang-il (PRK) | 0 | 2 | 0
Sanjarbek Jumashev (UZB) | 1 | 0 | 1
Omid Norouzi (IRI) | 3 | 3
Xie Zhen (CHN) | 0 | 0

Semifinals
Ravinder Singh (IND) | 0 | 0
Jung Ji-hyun (KOR) | 3 | 5
Sanjarbek Jumashev (UZB) | 0 | 2 | 0
Omid Norouzi (IRI) | 1 | 0 | 1

Final
Jung Ji-hyun (KOR) | 3 | 0 | 0
Omid Norouzi (IRI) | 0 | 2 | 2

=== Repechage ===
Repechage round 1
Ryutaro Matsumoto (JPN) | 0 | 1 | 3
Xie Zhen (CHN) | 7 | 1 | 0

Bronze medals
Muhammad Aliansyah (INA) | 3 | 0
Ravinder Singh (IND) | 7 | 2
Ryutaro Matsumoto (JPN) | 0 | 3 | 2
Sanjarbek Jumashev (UZB) | 3 | 2 | 0

== Final standing ==
| Rank | Athlete |
|---|---|
| 1st place, gold medalist(s) | Omid Norouzi (IRI) |
| 2nd place, silver medalist(s) | Jung Ji-hyun (KOR) |
| 3rd place, bronze medalist(s) | Ravinder Singh (IND) |
| 3rd place, bronze medalist(s) | Ryutaro Matsumoto (JPN) |
| 5 | Muhammad Aliansyah (INA) |
| 5 | Sanjarbek Jumashev (UZB) |
| 7 | Ri Kwang-il (PRK) |
| 8 | Xie Zhen (CHN) |
| 9 | Nurbakyt Tengizbayev (KAZ) |
| 10 | Aziz Beishaliev (KGZ) |
| 11 | Agamyrat Orazsähedow (TKM) |
| 12 | Tạ Ngọc Tân (VIE) |
