= Sayed Abdelmoneim =

Egyptian Greco-Roman wrestler

Personal information
- Full name: Sayed Hamed Abdelmoneim
- Nationality: Egypt
- Born: 25 September 1988 (age 37) Cairo, Egypt
- Height: 1.70 m (5 ft 7 in)
- Weight: 60 kg (132 lb)

Sport
- Sport: Wrestling
- Event: Greco-Roman
- Club: Post Sports Club
- Coached by: Mahmoud Mostafa

Sayed Hamed Abdelmoneim (Arabic: سيد عبد المنعم سيد حامد; born September 25, 1988) is an amateur Egyptian Greco-Roman wrestler, who played for the men's lightweight category. Abdelmoneim represented Egypt at the 2012 Summer Olympics in London, where he competed for the men's 60 kg class. He received a bye for the preliminary round of sixteen match, before losing out to Georgia's Revaz Lashkhi, who was able to score eight points in two straight periods, leaving Abdelmoneim without a single point. Because his opponent advanced further into the gold medal match, Abdelmoneim was offered another shot for the bronze medal by entering the repechage bouts. Unfortunately, he was defeated in the second round by Russia's Zaur Kuramagomedov, with a three-set technical score (4–1, 0–4, 0–2), and a classification score of 1–3.
