= Wrestling at the 2012 Summer Olympics – Men's Greco-Roman 60 kg =

Men's Greco-Roman 60 kg at the Games of the XXX Olympiad
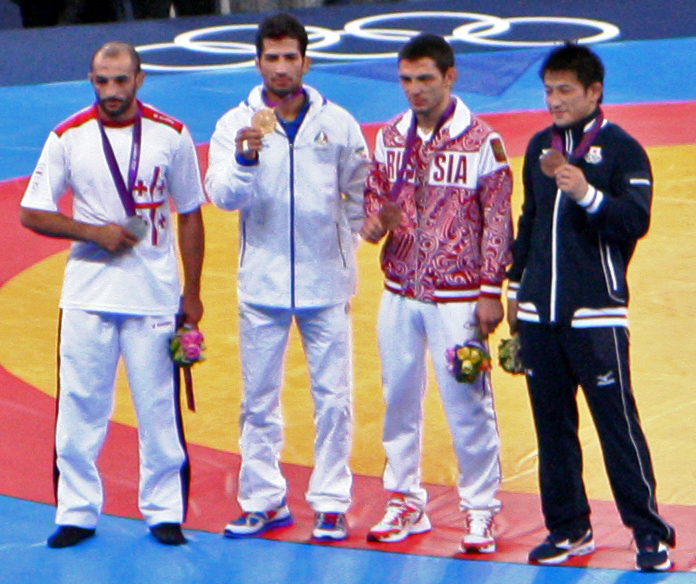
- Venue: ExCeL London
- Date: 6 August 2012
- Competitors: 19 from 19 nations

Medalists
1st place, gold medalist(s)		Omid Norouzi	Iran
2nd place, silver medalist(s)		Revaz Lashkhi	Georgia
3rd place, bronze medalist(s)		Zaur Kuramagomedov	Russia
3rd place, bronze medalist(s)		Ryutaro Matsumoto	Japan

Men's Greco-Roman 60 kilograms competition at the 2012 Summer Olympics in London, United Kingdom, took place on August 6 at ExCeL London.

This Greco-Roman wrestling competition consists of a single-elimination tournament, with a repechage used to determine the winner of two bronze medals. The two finalists face off for gold and silver medals. Each wrestler who loses to one of the two finalists moves into the repechage, culminating in a pair of bronze medal matches featuring the semifinal losers each facing the remaining repechage opponent from their half of the bracket.

Each bout consists of up to three rounds, lasting two minutes apiece. The wrestler who scores more points in each round is the winner of that rounds; the bout ends when one wrestler has won two rounds (and thus the match).

== Schedule ==
All times are British Summer Time (UTC+01:00)

Date	Time	Event
6 August 2012	13:00	Qualification rounds
6 August 2012	17:45	Repechage
6 August 2012	18:30	Finals

== Results ==
Legend

- F — Won by fall

=== Final ===
Final
Revaz Lashkhi (GEO)	0	0
Omid Norouzi (IRI)	1	1

=== Top half ===
Qualifications

1/8 finals
Stig-André Berge (NOR)	0	1	0
Hasan Aliyev (AZE)	1	0	2
Hanser Meoque (CUB)	0	0
Jung Ji-hyun (KOR)	6	3
Revaz Lashkhi (GEO)	2	6
Sayed Abdelmoneim (EGY)	0	0
Zaur Kuramagomedov (RUS)	1	1
Tarek Benaissa (ALG)	0	0

1/4 finals
Hasan Aliyev (AZE)	2	1
Jung Ji-hyun (KOR)	0	0
Revaz Lashkhi (GEO)	2	1
Zaur Kuramagomedov (RUS)	0	0

Semifinals
Hasan Aliyev (AZE)	1	0	0
Revaz Lashkhi (GEO)	0	3	1

=== Bottom half ===
Qualifications
Lenur Temirov (UKR)	0	0
Almat Kebispayev (KAZ)	7	1
Ellis Coleman (USA)	0	1
Ivo Angelov (BUL)	1	7
Sheng Jiang (CHN)	0	2	0
Omid Norouzi (IRI)	1	0	1

1/8 finals
Jarkko Ala-Huikku (FIN)	0	0
Tarik Belmadani (FRA)	2	2
Rahman Bilici (TUR)	0	0
Ryutaro Matsumoto (JPN)	1	5
Luis Liendo (VEN)	0	2	0
Almat Kebispayev (KAZ)	1	0	2
Ivo Angelov (BUL)	0	0
Omid Norouzi (IRI)	1	3

1/4 finals
Tarik Belmadani (FRA)	0	0
Ryutaro Matsumoto (JPN)	1	1
Almat Kebispayev (KAZ)	1	0
Omid Norouzi (IRI)	3	3

Semifinals
Ryutaro Matsumoto (JPN)	0	0
Omid Norouzi (IRI)	1	1

=== Repechage ===
Repechage round 1
Sheng Jiang (CHN)	2	0	0
Ivo Angelov (BUL)	0	1	4

Repechage round 2
Sayed Abdelmoneim (EGY)	4	0	0
Zaur Kuramagomedov (RUS)	1	4	2
Ivo Angelov (BUL)	0	0
Almat Kebispayev (KAZ)	1	2

Bronze medals
Zaur Kuramagomedov (RUS)	2	3
Hasan Aliyev (AZE)	0	0
Almat Kebispayev (KAZ)	2	1	0
Ryutaro Matsumoto (JPN)	1	3	3^{F}

== Final standing ==
Rank	Athlete
1st place, gold medalist(s)	Omid Norouzi (IRI)
2nd place, silver medalist(s)	Revaz Lashkhi (GEO)
3rd place, bronze medalist(s)	Zaur Kuramagomedov (RUS)
3rd place, bronze medalist(s)	Ryutaro Matsumoto (JPN)
5	Hasan Aliyev (AZE)
5	Almat Kebispayev (KAZ)
7	Ivo Angelov (BUL)
8	Jung Ji-hyun (KOR)
9	Tarik Belmadani (FRA)
10	Sheng Jiang (CHN)
11	Sayed Abdelmoneim (EGY)
12	Luis Liendo (VEN)
13	Stig-André Berge (NOR)
14	Ellis Coleman (USA)
15	Tarek Benaissa (ALG)
16	Jarkko Ala-Huikku (FIN)
17	Rahman Bilici (TUR)
18	Lenur Temirov (UKR)
19	Hanser Meoque (CUB)
