= Luis Liendo (wrestler) =

Venezuelan Greco-Roman wrestler

Personal information
- Full name: Luis Ygnacio Liendo
- Nationality: Venezuela
- Born: 25 November 1980 (age 45) Caracas, Distrito Capital, Venezuela
- Height: 1.72 m (5 ft 7 1/2 in)
- Weight: 60 kg (132 lb)

Sport
- Sport: Wrestling
- Event: Greco-Roman
- Club: Caracas National Sports; Institute
- Coached by: Mario Figueroa
Medal record
Men's Greco-Roman wrestling
Representing Venezuela
Pan American Games
Gold medal – first place	2011 Guadalajara	60 kg
Silver medal – second place	2003 Santo Domingo	60 kg
Bronze medal – third place	2007 Rio de Janeiro	60 kg

Luis Ygnacio Liendo (born November 25, 1980, in Caracas, Distrito Capital) is an amateur Venezuelan Greco-Roman wrestler, who competes in the men's lightweight category. He won two bronze medals for the 60 kg division at the 2003 Pan American Games in Santo Domingo, Dominican Republic, and at the 2007 Pan American Games in Rio de Janeiro, Brazil. Liendo also defeated United States wrestler Joe Betterman for the gold medal in the same division at the 2011 Pan American Games in Guadalajara, Mexico, earning him a spot on the Venezuelan wrestling team for the Olympics.

At age thirty-one, Liendo made his official Olympic debut at the 2012 Summer Olympics in London, where he competed in the men's 60 kg class. He received a bye for the preliminary round of sixteen match, before losing out to Kazakhstan's Almat Kebispayev, with a three-set technical score (0–1, 2–0, 0–2), and a classification point score of 1–3.
