= Emin Ahmadov =

Azerbaijani wrestler (born 1986)

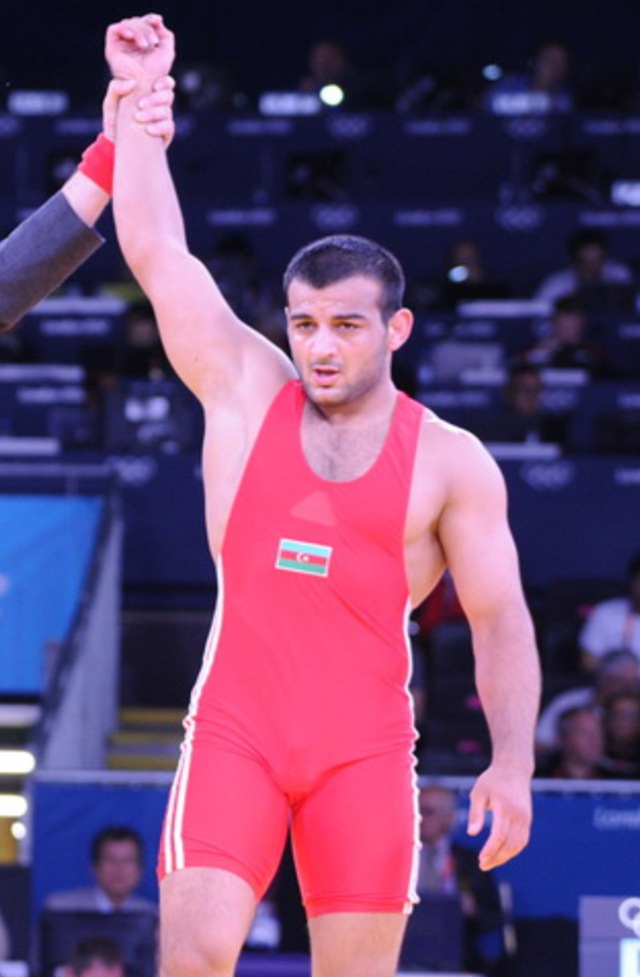

Medal record

Men's Greco-Roman wrestling

Representing Azerbaijan

Olympic Games
Bronze medal – third place	2012 London	74 kg

Emin Ahmadov (born 6 October 1986, Baku) is an Azerbaijani wrestler. He won the bronze medal at the 2012 Summer Olympics in the Greco-Roman men's 74 kg event. Along the way he beat Neven Zugaj and Zurab Datunashvili, before losing to Arsen Julfalakyan in the semi-final. Because Julfalakyan reached the final, Ahmadov was a participant in the bronze medal repêchage, where he beat Aliaksandr Kikiniou in his bronze medal match.
