= Revaz Lashkhi =

Georgian Greco-Roman wrestler

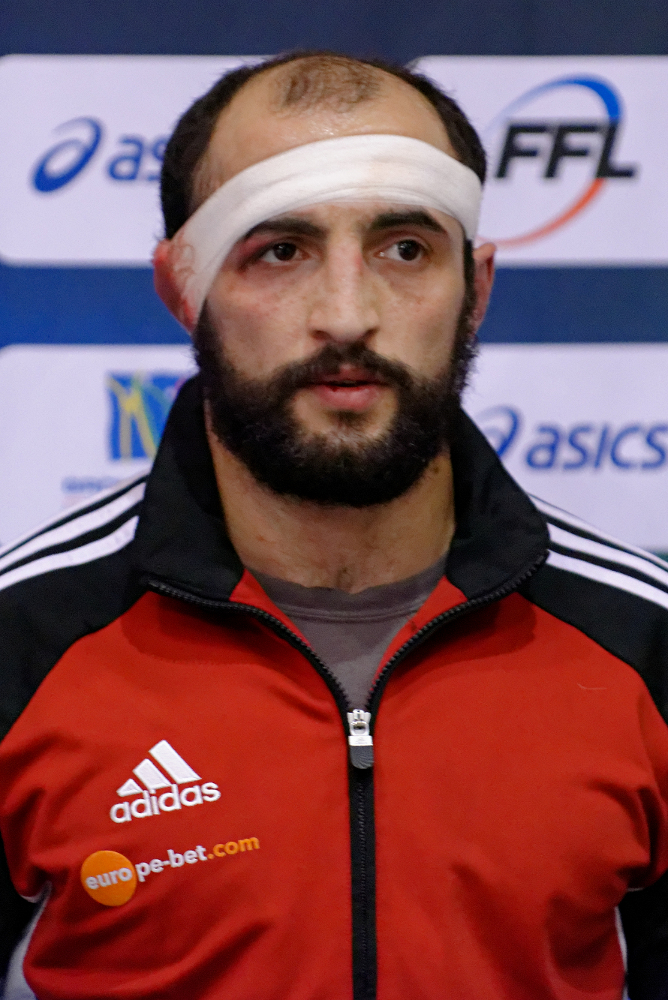
- Lashkhi at the 2014 Paris Golden Grand Prix

Personal information
- Born: 26 May 1988 (age 38) Borjomi, Georgian SSR, Soviet Union
Medal record
Men's Greco-Roman wrestling
Representing Georgia
Olympic Games
Silver medal – second place	2012 London	60 kg
European Championships
Gold medal – first place	2011 Dortmund	60 kg

Revaz Lashkhi (Georgian: რევაზ ლაშხი; born 26 May 1988 in Borjomi, Georgia) is a Georgian Greco-Roman wrestler, who competed at the 2012 Summer Olympics and won a silver medal in the men's Greco-Roman 60 kg category. He beat Sayed Abdelmoneim, then Zaur Kuramagomedov in the quarterfinal and Həsən Əliyev in the semi-final before losing to Omid Norouzi in the final.
