= Omid Norouzi =

Iranian wrestler (born 1986)

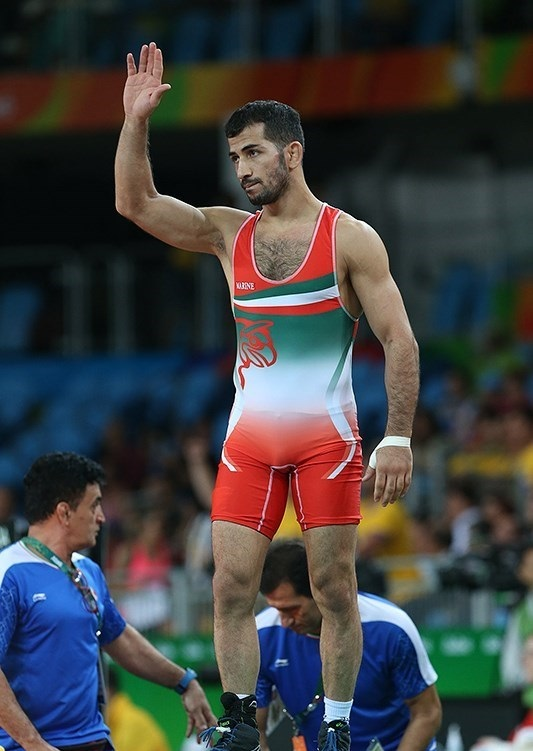
- Omid Norouzi at the 2016 Summer Olympics

Personal information
- Native name: امید نوروزی
- Full name: Omid Norouzi
- Nationality: Iranian
- Born: February 18, 1986 (age 40) Shiraz, Iran
- Height: 1.74 m (5 ft 9 in)
- Weight: 66 kg (146 lb)
- Website: Official Instagram Profile

Sport
- Sport: Wrestling
- Event: Greco-Roman

Achievements and titles
- Olympic finals: 2012 Summer Olympics
Medal record
Men's Greco-Roman wrestling
Representing Iran
Olympic Games
| Gold medal – first place | 2012 London | 60 kg |
World Championships
| Gold medal – first place | 2011 Istanbul | 60 kg |
| Silver medal – second place | 2014 Tashkent | 66 kg |
Asian Games
| Gold medal – first place | 2010 Guangzhou | 60 kg |

Omid Norouzi (Persian: امید نوروزی, born 18 February 1986) is an Iranian wrestler. In 2010 he won the gold medal at the 2010 Asian Games and another gold medal in the Greco-Roman 60 kg category at the 2012 Summer Olympics in London.
