= Ryūtarō Matsumoto =

Japanese Greco-Roman wrestler

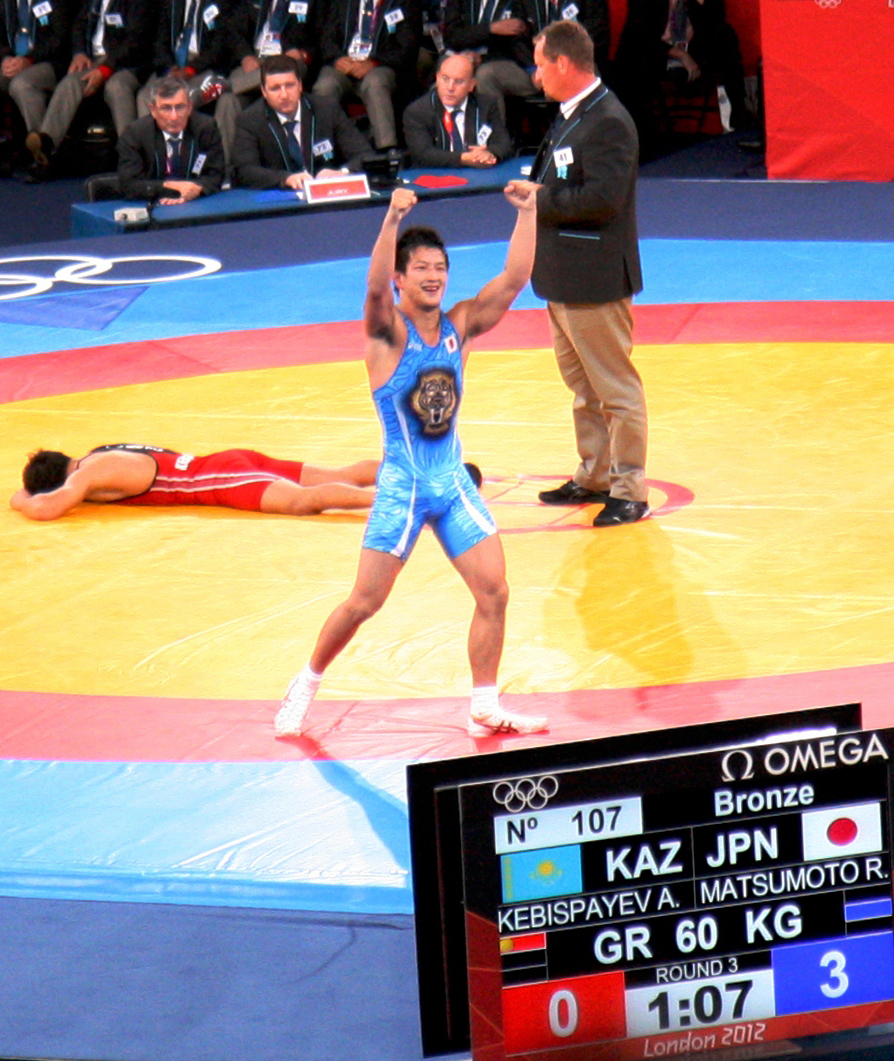
- Matsumoto at the 2012 Olympics

Personal information
- Nationality: Japan
- Born: January 16, 1986 (age 40)
- Height: 168 cm (66 in)
- Weight: 60 kg (132 lb)

Sport
- Sport: Wrestling
- Event: Greco-Roman
- Club: Gunma Yakult
Medal record
Men's Greco-Roman wrestling
Representing Japan
Olympic Games
Bronze medal – third place	2012 London	60 kg
World Championships
Silver medal – second place	2010 Moscow	60 kg
Asian Games
Bronze medal – third place	2010 Guangzhou	60 kg

Ryūtarō Matsumoto (松本 隆太郎, Matsumoto Ryūtarō; born January 16, 1986) is a Japanese wrestler won a bronze medal at the 2012 Summer Olympics in the Greco-Roman 60 kg category.

Matsumoto graduated from the Nippon Sport Science University in Tokyo and is competing for the Gunma Yakult club. His younger brother, Atsushi Matsumoto, is also an international wrestler.
