= Zaur Kuramagomedov =

Russian wrestler (born 1988)

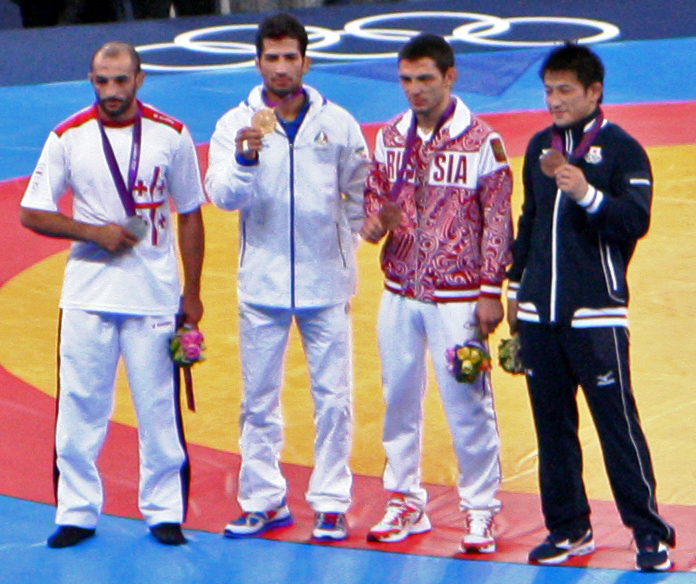
- Zaur Kuramagomedov (second from right) at the 2012 Olympics

Personal information
- Born: 30 March 1988 (age 38) Tyrnyauz, Kabardino-Balkaria
- Height: 1.62 m (5 ft 4 in)
- Weight: 60 kg (130 lb)

Sport
- Sport: Wrestling
- Event: Greco-Roman
Medal record
Men's Greco-Roman wrestling
Representing Russia
Olympic Games
Bronze medal – third place	2012 London	60 kg
World Championships
Bronze medal – third place	2011 Istanbul	60 kg
European Championships
Silver medal – second place	2007 Sofia	55 kg
Bronze medal – third place	2010 Baku	60 kg

Zaur Ismatulayevich Kuramagomedov (Russian: Заур Исматулаевич Курамагомедов; born 30 March 1988) is a Russian wrestler who won a bronze medal at the 2012 Summer Olympics in the Greco-Roman 60 kg category.
