= Nick Gwiazdowski =

American wrestler (born 1992)

Personal information
- Full name: Nicholas Edward Gwiazdowski
- Born: December 30, 1992 (age 33) Duanesburg, New York, U.S.
- Height: 6 ft 1 in (185 cm)
- Weight: 125 kg (276 lb)

Sport
- Country: United States
- Sport: Wrestling
- Events: Freestyle and Folkstyle
- College team: NC State
- Club: Titan Mercury WC; Wolfpack WC
- Coached by: Pat Popolizio; Jamill Kelly; Obe Blanc; Frank Beasley
Medal record
Men's freestyle wrestling
Representing the United States
World Championships
Bronze medal – third place	2017 Paris	125 kg
Bronze medal – third place	2018 Budapest	125 kg
Pan American Games
Gold medal – first place	2019 Lima	125 kg
Pan American Championships
Gold medal – first place	2018 Lima	125 kg
Gold medal – first place	2019 Buenos Aires	125 kg
Silver medal – second place	2022 Acapulco	125 kg
Golden Grand Prix Ivan Yarygin
Bronze medal – third place	2018 Krasnoyarsk	125 kg
Poland Open (Wacław Ziółkowski Memorial)
Gold medal – first place	2023 Warsaw	125 kg
Silver medal – second place	2021 Warsaw	125 kg
Bronze medal – third place	2016 Spala	125 kg
Grand Prix
Gold medal – first place	2015 Madrid	125 kg
Gold medal – first place	2015 New York	125 kg
Gold medal – first place	2017 Madrid	125 kg
Gold medal – first place	2022 New York	125 kg
Gold medal – first place	2023 New York	125 kg
Silver medal – second place	2016 Khasavyurt	125 kg
Silver medal – second place	2019 Istanbul	125 kg
Bronze medal – third place	2018 Krasnoyarsk	125 kg
Bronze medal – third place	2018 Istambul	125 kg
Bronze medal – third place	2021 Nice	125 kg
US National Championships
Gold medal – first place	2017 Las Vegas	125 kg
Gold medal – first place	2021 Coralville	125 kg
Men's collegiate wrestling
Representing the NC State Wolfpack
NCAA Division I Championships
Gold medal – first place	2014 Oklahoma City	285 lb
Gold medal – first place	2015 St. Louis	285 lb
Silver medal – second place	2016 New York	285 lb
ACC Championships
Gold medal – first place	2014 Blacksburg	285 lb
Gold medal – first place	2015 Pittsburgh	285 lb
Gold medal – first place	2016 Charlottesville	285 lb
Representing the Binghamton Bearcats
CAA Championships
Gold medal – first place	2012 Vestal	285 lb

Nickolos Edward Gwiazdowski (born December 30, 1992) is an American freestyle wrestler and graduated folkstyle wrestler. A two-time NCAA Division I National Champion for the North Carolina State Wolfpack, Gwiazdowski has won two bronze medals at the World Championships, a Pan American Games title, and two Pan American championships for Team USA.

== High school career ==
He was a two-time NYSPHSAA Division II state champion for Duanesburg High School in Delanson, New York, where he went 50-0 as a senior and managed to not have a single opponent go the entire match with him. He received the Dave Schultz and Junior Schalles Awards at the end of his senior season in 2011.

== College career ==
Nick earned All-American honors as a true freshman at Binghamton University in 2012 (8th at 285 lb). He then transferred to North Carolina State University and redshirted the 2012-13 season to preserve his NCAA eligibility. While there he was then a three-time All-American for the Wolfpack, twice a national champion (2014 & 2015) and once a runner-up (2016), while competing at the 285 lb. heavyweight division. He lost his last match to eventual Olympic gold medalist Kyle Snyder.

== International career ==
Gwiazdowski competed at the 2017 Wrestling World Cup - Men's freestyle, losing in the take-all final match.

Gwiazdowski qualified for the 2017 World Wrestling Championships at 125 kg by winning the U.S. Team Trials where he was an automatic finalist by being U.S. Open champion. At the 2017 Worlds, he won a bronze medal.

At the Golden Grand Prix Ivan Yarygin 2018 he lost to Muradin Kushkhov of Russia in the quarterfinals, but went on to wrestle back and win a bronze medal against Lkhagvagerel Munkhtur of Mongolia.

In 2022, he competed at the Yasar Dogu Tournament held in Istanbul, Turkey.

== Coaching career ==
On August 21, 2021, while still competing internationally, Gwiazdowski joined the coaching staff of Cornell University as a volunteer assistant coach. He continued to coach the Big Red through the 2023-24 season.

On November 8, 2024, Warren Central High School in Indianapolis announced that he had been hired as an assistant coach.

== Freestyle record ==
Senior Freestyle Matches
Res.	Record	Opponent	Score	Date	Event	Location
2024 Olympic Team Trials (bronze) at 125 kg
Win	145-48	(United States) Dom Bradley	7–4	April 19, 2024	2024 Olympic Team Trials	(United States) State College, Pennsylvania
Loss	144-48	(United States) Hayden Zillmer	1-5	April 19, 2024	2024 Olympic Team Trials	(United States) State College, Pennsylvania
Win	144-47	(United States) Greg Kerkvliet	5–1	April 19, 2024	2024 Olympic Team Trials	(United States) State College, Pennsylvania
Win	143-47	(United States) Jaron Smith	TF 12–1	April 19, 2024	2024 Olympic Team Trials	(United States) State College, Pennsylvania
2024 Grand Prix Zagreb Open 5th at 125 kg
Loss	142-47	(China) Deng Zhiwei	4-7	January 10, 2024	2024 Grand Prix Zagreb Open	Zagreb, Croatia
Loss	142-46	(Iran) Amir Hossein Zare	TF 0-11	January 10, 2024	2024 Grand Prix Zagreb Open	Zagreb, Croatia
Win	142-45	(United States) Christian Lance	4–2	January 10, 2024	2024 Grand Prix Zagreb Open	Zagreb, Croatia
Win	141-45	(Germany) Gennadij Cudinovic	TF 10–0	January 10, 2024	2024 Grand Prix Zagreb Open	Zagreb, Croatia
2023 Bill Farrell Memorial (gold) at 125 kg
Win	140-45	(United States) Christian Lance	7–0	November 17, 2023	2023 Bill Farrell Memorial	(United States) New York City, New York
Win	139-45	(United States) Sam Schuyler	7–2	November 17, 2023	2023 Bill Farrell Memorial	(United States) New York City, New York
Win	138-45	(Egypt) Youssef Hemida	TF 10–0	November 17, 2023	2023 Bill Farrell Memorial	(United States) New York City, New York
2023 Ziolkowski Memorial International (gold) at 125 kg
Win	137-45	(Azerbaijan) Giorgi Meshvildishvili	9–2	July 30, 2023	2023 Ziolkowski Memorial International	Warsaw, Poland
Win	136-45	(Poland) Robert Baran	6–1	July 30, 2023	2023 Ziolkowski Memorial International	Warsaw, Poland
Win	135-45	(Bulgaria) Islam Adizov	8–0	July 30, 2023	2023 Ziolkowski Memorial International	Warsaw, Poland
2023 Senior World Team Trials Challenge Tournament (silver) at 125 kg
Loss	134-45	(United States) Mason Parris	2-6	May 21, 2023	2023 Senior World Team Trials Challenge Tournament	(United States) Colorado Springs, Colorado
Win	134-44	(United States) Dom Bradley	TF 11–0	May 21, 2023	2023 Senior World Team Trials Challenge Tournament	(United States) Colorado Springs, Colorado
2023 US Open (silver) at 125 kg
Loss	133-44	(United States) Gable Steveson	TF 0-10	April 27, 2023	2023 US Open	(United States) Las Vegas, Nevada
Win	133-43	(United States) Dom Bradley	8–0	April 27, 2023	2023 US Open	(United States) Las Vegas, Nevada
Win	132-43	(United States) Christian Lance	6–0	April 27, 2023	2023 US Open	(United States) Las Vegas, Nevada
Win	131-43	(United States) Joshua Heindselman	TF 17–6	April 27, 2023	2023 US Open	(United States) Las Vegas, Nevada
Win	130-43	(United States) Peter Ming	TF 10–0	April 27, 2023	2023 US Open	(United States) Las Vegas, Nevada
2023 Ibrahim Moustafa 5th at 125 kg
Loss	129-43	(Kazakhstan) Yusup Batirmurzaev	TF 0-11	March 24, 2023	2023 Ibrahim Moustafa	Alexandria, Egypt
Loss	129-42	(Turkey) Taha Akgül	2-7	March 24, 2023	2023 Ibrahim Moustafa	Alexandria, Egypt
Win	129-41	(Poland) Robert Baran	8–4	March 24, 2023	2023 Ibrahim Moustafa	Alexandria, Egypt
Win	128-41	(Hungary) Dániel Ligeti	8–2	March 24, 2023	2023 Ibrahim Moustafa	Alexandria, Egypt
2022 Bill Farrell Memorial (gold) at 125 kg
Win	127-41	(United States) Demetrius Thomas	5–2	November 19, 2022	2022 Bill Farrell Memorial	(United States) New York City, New York
Win	126-41	(United States) Christian Lance	TF 11–0	November 19, 2022	2022 Bill Farrell Memorial	(United States) New York City, New York
Win	125-41	(United States) Ceron Francisco	TF 10–0	November 19, 2022	2022 Bill Farrell Memorial	(United States) New York City, New York
Win	124-41	(Ukraine) Mahamed Zakariiev	8–4	November 19, 2022	2022 Bill Farrell Memorial	(United States) New York City, New York
Loss	123-41	(United States) Hayden Zillmer	5–5	June 8, 2022	2022 Final X: World Team Trials	(United States) New York City, New York
Loss	123-40	(United States) Hayden Zillmer	3-4	June 8, 2022	2022 Final X: World Team Trials	(United States) New York City, New York
Win	123-39	(United States) Hayden Zillmer	5–0	June 8, 2022	2022 Final X: World Team Trials	(United States) New York City, New York
2022 World Team Trials Challenge Tournament (gold) at 125 kg
Win	122-39	(United States) Tony Cassioppi	TF 10–0	May 20, 2022	2022 World Team Trials Challenge Tournament	(United States) Coralville, Iowa
Win	121-39	(United States) Christian Lance	TF 10–0	May 20, 2022	2022 World Team Trials Challenge Tournament	(United States) Coralville, Iowa
2022 Pan American Championships (silver) at 125 kg
Loss	120-39	(Canada) Amar Dhesi	3-5	May 6, 2022	2022 Pan American Championships	Acapulco, Mexico
Win	120-38	(Venezuela) José Daniel Díaz	TF 11–1	May 6, 2022	2022 Pan American Championships	Acapulco, Mexico
Win	119-38	(Puerto Rico) Charles Merrill	TF 10–0	May 6, 2022	2022 Pan American Championships	Acapulco, Mexico
2022 Yasar Dogu Tournament DNP at 125 kg
Loss	118-38	(Russia) Atsamaz Tebloev	4-6	February 27, 2022	2022 Yasar Dogu Tournament	Istanbul, Turkey
Win	118-37	(United States) Hayden Zillmer	3–0	February 27, 2022	2022 Yasar Dogu Tournament	Istanbul, Turkey
Win	117-37	(Puerto Rico) Zach Merrill	TF 10-0	February 13, 2022	2022 Bout at the Ballpark	(United States) Arlington, Texas
2021 World Championships 5th at 125 kg
Loss	116–37	(Turkey) Taha Akgül	4–6	October 3, 2021	2021 World Championships	Oslo, Norway
Win	116–36	(Belarus) Dzianis Khramiankou	6–1	October 3, 2021	2021 World Championships	Oslo, Norway
Loss	115–36	(Iran) Amir Hossein Zare	TF 0–10	October 2, 2021	2021 World Championships	Oslo, Norway
Win	115–35	(Canada) Amar Dhesi	8–3	October 2, 2021	2021 World Championships	Oslo, Norway
2021 US World Team Trials (gold) at 125 kg
Win	114–35	(United States) Mason Parris	10–3	September 12, 2021	2021 US World Team Trials	(United States) Lincoln, Nebraska
Win	113–35	(United States) Mason Parris	6–0	September 12, 2021	2021 US World Team Trials	(United States) Lincoln, Nebraska
Win	112–35	(United States) Jordan Wood	9–0	September 11, 2021	2021 US World Team Trials	(United States) Lincoln, Nebraska
Win	111–35	(United States) Demetrius Thomas	TF 10–0	September 11, 2021	2021 US World Team Trials	(United States) Lincoln, Nebraska
2021 Poland Open (silver) at 125 kg
Loss	110–35	(Iran) Amir Hossein Zare	DQ (1–6)	June 9, 2021	2021 Poland Open	Warsaw, Poland
Win	110–34	(Egypt) Youssif Hemida	TF 10–0	June 9, 2021	2021 Poland Open	Warsaw, Poland
Win	109–34	(Kazakhstan) Yusup Batirmurzaev	9–2	June 9, 2021	2021 Poland Open	Warsaw, Poland
2021 US Open (gold) at 125 kg
Win	108–34	(United States) Tony Cassioppi	TF 12–0	May 1–2, 2021	2021 US Open National Championships	(United States) Coralville, Iowa
Win	107–34	(United States) Christian Lance	9–0	May 1–2, 2021	2021 US Open National Championships	(United States) Coralville, Iowa
Win	106–34	(United States) Matt Stencel	TF 10–0	May 1–2, 2021	2021 US Open National Championships	(United States) Coralville, Iowa
Win	105–34	(United States) Aydin Guttridge	TF 10–0	May 1–2, 2021	2021 US Open National Championships	(United States) Coralville, Iowa
2020 US Olympic Team Trials (silver) at 125 kg
Loss	104–34	(United States) Gable Steveson	4–10	April 2–3, 2021	2020 US Olympic Team Trials	(United States) Fort Worth, Texas
Loss	104–33	(United States) Gable Steveson	TF 0–10	April 2–3, 2021	2020 US Olympic Team Trials	(United States) Fort Worth, Texas
Win	104–32	(United States) Dom Bradley	TF 11–0	April 2–3, 2021	2020 US Olympic Team Trials	(United States) Fort Worth, Texas
Win	103–32	(United States) Garrett Ryan	TF 11–0	April 2–3, 2021	2020 US Olympic Team Trials	(United States) Fort Worth, Texas
2021 Henri Deglane Grand Prix (bronze) at 125 kg
Win	102–32	(Germany) Asghar Laghari	TF 10–0	January 16–17, 2021	Grand Prix de France Henri Deglane 2021	Nice, France
Loss	101–32	(Poland) Robert Baran	5–5	January 16–17, 2021	Grand Prix de France Henri Deglane 2021	Nice, France
Win	101–31	(Finland) Jere Heino	TF 11–0	January 16–17, 2021	Grand Prix de France Henri Deglane 2021	Nice, France
FloWrestling RTC Cup 4th as WRTC at 125 kg
Loss	100–31	(United States) Mason Parris	7–10	December 4–5, 2020	FloWrestling RTC Cup	(United States) Austin, Texas
Win	100–30	(Canada) Amar Dhesi	TF 11–0	December 4–5, 2020	FloWrestling RTC Cup	(United States) Austin, Texas
Loss	99–30	(United States) Gable Steveson	1–4	December 4–5, 2020	FloWrestling RTC Cup	(United States) Austin, Texas
Win	99–29	(United States) Mason Parris	TF 18–8	December 4–5, 2020	FloWrestling RTC Cup	(United States) Austin, Texas
Win	98–29	(United States) Kyven Gadson	TF 10–0	August 30, 2020	Chael Sonnen's Wrestling Underground I	United States
2020 Pan American Olympic Qualification (gold) at 125 kg
Win	97–29	(Canada) Amar Dhesi	FF	March 15, 2020	2020 Pan American Olympic Qualification Tournament	Ottawa, Canada
Win	96–29	(Venezuela) Luis Vivenes	TF 10–0	March 15, 2020	2020 Pan American Olympic Qualification Tournament	Ottawa, Canada
2019–20 Deutsche Ringerliga season (silver) for Team Ispringen at 130 kg
Win	95–29	(Germany) Etienne Wyrich	TF 16–0	January 18, 2020	2019–2020 Deutsche Ringerliga season	Germany
2019 Alans International 5th at 125 kg
Loss	94–29	(Iran) Amir Hossein Zare	TF 0–10	December 7–8, 2019	2019 Alans International	Vladikavkaz, Russia
Win	94–28	(Russia) Khasan Khubaev	8–6	December 7–8, 2019	2019 Alans International	Vladikavkaz, Russia
Loss	93–28	(Russia) Batradz Gazzaev	2–9	December 7–8, 2019	2019 Alans International	Vladikavkaz, Russia
Loss	93–27	(Russia) Zelimkhan Khizriev	7–7	November 24, 2019	2019–2020 Deutsche Ringerliga season	Germany
Win	93–26	(Germany) Marco Becker	TF 16–0	November 23, 2019	2019–2020 Deutsche Ringerliga season	Germany
2019 World Championships 17th at 125 kg
Loss	92–26	(Iran) Yadollah Mohebbi	2–5	September 20, 2019	2019 World Championships	Nur-Sultan, Kazakhstan
2019 Pan American Games (gold) at 125 kg
Win	92–25	(Cuba) Óscar Pino	TF 10–0	August 10, 2019	2019 Pan American Games	Lima, Peru
Win	91–25	(Canada) Korey Jarvis	TF 10–0	August 10, 2019	2019 Pan American Games	Lima, Peru
Win	90–25	(Peru) Andrew Gunning	TF 10–0	August 10, 2019	2019 Pan American Games	Lima, Peru
2019 Yasar Dogu (silver) at 125 kg
Loss	89–25	(Turkey) Taha Akgül	1–5	July 11–14, 2019	2019 Yasar Dogu	Istanbul, Turkey
Win	89–24	(India) Sumit Sumit	6–2	July 11–14, 2019	2019 Yasar Dogu	Istanbul, Turkey
Win	88–24	(Turkey) Fatih Çakıroğlu	FF	July 11–14, 2019	2019 Yasar Dogu	Istanbul, Turkey
2019 US World Team Trials (gold) at 125 kg
Win	87–24	(United States) Gable Steveson	3–3	June 7–8, 2019	2019 Final X: Rutgers	(United States) New Brunswick, New Jersey
Win	86–24	(United States) Gable Steveson	4–4	June 7–8, 2019	2019 Final X: Rutgers	(United States) New Brunswick, New Jersey
Win	85–24	(United States) Derek White	9–0	May 6, 2019	2019 Beat the Streets: Grapple at the Garden	(United States) New York City, New York
2019 Pan American Championships (gold) at 125 kg
Win	84–24	(Canada) Korey Jarvis	TF 10–0	April 1, 2019	2019 Pan American Championships	Buenos Aires, Argentina
Win	83–24	(Cuba) Óscar Pino	TF 11–1	April 1, 2019	2019 Pan American Championships	Buenos Aires, Argentina
Win	82–24	(Mexico) Eduardo García	TF 10–0	April 1, 2019	2019 Pan American Championships	Buenos Aires, Argentina
Win	81–24	(Puerto Rico) Marcos Santos	TF 10–0	April 1, 2019	2019 Pan American Championships	Buenos Aires, Argentina
2019 Dan Kolov - Nikola Petrov Memorial 7th at 125 kg
Loss	80–24	(China) Deng Zhiwei	5–7	February 28 – March 3, 2019	2019 Dan Kolov - Nikola Petrov Memorial	Ruse, Bulgaria
Loss	80–23	(Iran) Parviz Hadi	2–5	February 28 – March 3, 2019	2019 Dan Kolov - Nikola Petrov Memorial	Ruse, Bulgaria
Win	80–22	(Turkey) Fatih Çakıroğlu	6–0	February 28 – March 3, 2019	2019 Dan Kolov - Nikola Petrov Memorial	Ruse, Bulgaria
Win	79–22	(Poland) Robert Baran	5–1	February 28 – March 3, 2019	2019 Dan Kolov - Nikola Petrov Memorial	Ruse, Bulgaria
2018–19 Deutsche Ringerliga season 4th for Team Ispringen at 130 kg
Win	78–22	(Russia) Magomedgadzhi Nurasulov	5–4	January 12, 2019	2018–2019 Deutsche Ringerliga season	Germany
Win	77–22	(Qatar) Giorgi Sakandelidze	3–2	December 8, 2018	2018–2019 Deutsche Ringerliga season	Germany
Win	76–22	(Hungary) Dániel Ligeti	TF 16–0	December 1, 2018	2018–2019 Deutsche Ringerliga season	Germany
Win	75–22	(Russia) Anzor Khizriev	4–2	November 10, 2018	2018–2019 Deutsche Ringerliga season	Germany
2018 World Championships (bronze) at 125 kg
Win	74–22	(India) Sumit Malik	7–2	October 20–21, 2018	2018 World Championships	Budapest, Hungary
Win	73–22	(Canada) Amar Dhesi	7–0	October 20–21, 2018	2018 World Championships	Budapest, Hungary
Loss	72–22	(China) Deng Zhiwei	4–5	October 20–21, 2018	2018 World Championships	Budapest, Hungary
Win	72–21	(Mongolia) Natsagsürengiin Zolboo	9–4	October 20–21, 2018	2018 World Championships	Budapest, Hungary
2018 Yasar Dogu (bronze) at 125 kg
Win	71–21	(Germany) Nick Matuhin	6–4	July 27–29, 2018	2018 Yasar Dogu	Istanbul, Turkey
Loss	70–21	(Ukraine) Oleksandr Khotsianivskyi	3–4	July 27–29, 2018	2018 Yasar Dogu	Istanbul, Turkey
Win	70–20	(Kazakhstan) Duman Bultrikov	TF 10–0	July 27–29, 2018	2018 Yasar Dogu	Istanbul, Turkey
Win	69–20	(India) Sumit Sumit	TF 10–0	July 27–29, 2018	2018 Yasar Dogu	Istanbul, Turkey
2018 US World Team Trials (gold) at 125 kg
Win	68–20	(United States) Adam Coon	6–1	June 22–23, 2018	2018 Final X: Lehigh	(United States) Bethlehem, Pennsylvania
Win	67–20	(United States) Adam Coon	6–1	June 22–23, 2018	2018 Final X: Lehigh	(United States) Bethlehem, Pennsylvania
Win	66–20	(Cuba) Yudenny Alpajón	9–1	May 17, 2018	2018 Beat the Streets: Team USA vs Cuba	(United States) New York City, New York
2018 Pan American Championships (gold) at 125 kg
Win	65–20	(Cuba) Yudenny Alpajón	9–0	May 3–6, 2018	2018 Pan American Championships	Lima, Peru
Win	64–20	(Dominican Republic) Carlos Félix	TF 11–0	May 3–6, 2018	2018 Pan American Championships	Lima, Peru
Win	63–20	(Argentina) Catriel Muriel	TF 10–0	May 3–6, 2018	2018 Pan American Championships	Lima, Peru
2018 Ivan Yarygin Golden Grand Prix (bronze) at 125 kg
Win	62–20	(Mongolia) Lkhagvagerel Munkhtur	5–1	January 27, 2018	Golden Grand Prix Ivan Yarygin 2018	Krasnoyarsk, Russia
Win	61–20	(China) Zhanxiang Hu	7–0	January 27, 2018	Golden Grand Prix Ivan Yarygin 2018	Krasnoyarsk, Russia
Loss	60–20	(Kabardino-Balkaria) Muradin Kushkhov	1–3	January 27, 2018	Golden Grand Prix Ivan Yarygin 2018	Krasnoyarsk, Russia
Win	60–19	(North Ossetia–Alania) Alan Khugaev	6–1	January 27, 2018	Golden Grand Prix Ivan Yarygin 2018	Krasnoyarsk, Russia
2017 World Clubs Cup (silver) as TMWC at 125 kg
Loss	59–19	(Georgia (country)) Geno Petriashvili	5–6	December 7–8, 2017	2017 World Clubs Cup	Tehran, Iran
Win	59–18	(Mongolia) Mönkhtöriin Lkhagvagerel	TF 10–0	December 7–8, 2017	2017 World Clubs Cup	Tehran, Iran
Win	58–18	(Bulgaria) Mert Emin	TF 10–0	December 7–8, 2017	2017 World Clubs Cup	Tehran, Iran
Win	57–18	(India) Pushpender Singh	TF 10–0	December 7–8, 2017	2017 World Clubs Cup	Tehran, Iran
Win	56–18	(Canada) Korey Jarvis	TF 10–0	December 7–8, 2017	2017 World Clubs Cup	Tehran, Iran
2017 World Championships (bronze) at 125 kg
Win	55–18	(Mongolia) Natsagsürengiin Zolboo	5–1	August 25, 2017	2017 World Championships	Paris, France
Loss	54–18	(Turkey) Taha Akgül	TF 0–10	August 25, 2017	2017 World Championships	Paris, France
Win	54–17	(Iran) Yadollah Mohebbi	5–4	August 25, 2017	2017 World Championships	Paris, France
Win	53–17	(Hungary) Dániel Ligeti	10–1	August 25, 2017	2017 World Championships	Paris, France
Win	52–17	(Moldova) Andrei Romanov	TF 10–0	August 25, 2017	2017 World Championships	Paris, France
2017 Spain Grand Prix (gold) at 125 kg
Win	51–17	(Iran) Amin Taheri Jafar	5–2	July 15–16, 2017	2017 Grand Prix of Spain	Madrid, Spain
Win	50–17	(Puerto Rico) Edgardo Lopez	TF 10–0	July 15–16, 2017	2017 Grand Prix of Spain	Madrid, Spain
Win	49–17	(Canada) Sean Molle	TF 14–4	July 15–16, 2017	2017 Grand Prix of Spain	Madrid, Spain
2017 US World Team Trials (gold) at 125 kg
Win	48–17	(United States) Dom Bradley	3–2	June 10, 2017	2017 US World Team Trials	(United States) Lincoln, Nebraska
Win	47–17	(United States) Dom Bradley	5–1	June 10, 2017	2017 US World Team Trials	(United States) Lincoln, Nebraska
Win	46–17	(Japan) Katsutoshi Kanazawa	TF 11–0	May 17, 2017	2017 Beat The Streets: Times Square	(United States) New York City, New York
2017 US Open (gold) at 125 kg
Win	45–17	(United States) Zach Rey	3–2	April 26–29, 2017	2017 US Open National Championships	(United States) Las Vegas, Nevada
Win	44–17	(United States) Dom Bradley	6–4	April 26–29, 2017	2017 US Open National Championships	(United States) Las Vegas, Nevada
Win	43–17	(United States) Bobby Telford	4–1	April 26–29, 2017	2017 US Open National Championships	(United States) Las Vegas, Nevada
Win	42–17	(United States) Daniel Stibral	TF 11–0	April 26–29, 2017	2017 US Open National Championships	(United States) Las Vegas, Nevada
Win	41–17	(United States) Michael Gregory	TF 10–0	April 26–29, 2017	2017 US Open National Championships	(United States) Las Vegas, Nevada
2017 World Cup (silver) as Team USA at 125 kg
Loss	40–17	(Iran) Komeil Ghasemi	0–5	February 16–17, 2017	2017 World Cup	Kermanshah, Iran
Loss	40–16	(Azerbaijan) Jamaladdin Magomedov	1–3	February 16–17, 2017	2017 World Cup	Kermanshah, Iran
2017 Ivan Yarygin Golden Grand Prix 14th at 125 kg
Loss	40–15	(Chechnya) Adlan Ibragimov	4–6	January 28, 2017	Golden Grand Prix Ivan Yarygin 2017	Krasnoyarsk, Russia
2016 World Clubs Cup (gold) as TMWC at 125 kg
Win	40–14	(Iran) Parviz Hadi	3–2	November 30 – December 1, 2016	2016 World Clubs Cup	Kharkov, Ukraine
Loss	39–14	(Russia) Alen Zasyeyev	2–4	November 30 – December 1, 2016	2016 World Clubs Cup	Kharkov, Ukraine
Loss	39–13	(Georgia (country)) Giorgi Meshvildishvili	2–5	November 30 – December 1, 2016	2016 World Clubs Cup	Kharkov, Ukraine
Win	39–12	(Ukraine) Oleksandr Khotsianivskyi	2–1	November 30 – December 1, 2016	2016 World Clubs Cup	Kharkov, Ukraine
2016 Intercontinental Cup (silver) at 125 kg
Loss	38–12	(Russia) Batraz Gazzaev	1–2	October 14–16, 2016	2016 Intercontinental Cup	Khasavyurt, Russia
Win	38–11	(Russia) Anzor Khizriev	5–1	October 14–16, 2016	2016 Intercontinental Cup	Khasavyurt, Russia
Win	37–11	(Azerbaijan) Umar Israilov	9–1	October 14–16, 2016	2016 Intercontinental Cup	Khasavyurt, Russia
Win	36–11	(Kazakhstan) Dmitry Popov	3–2	October 14–16, 2016	2016 Intercontinental Cup	Khasavyurt, Russia
2016 Ziolkowski International (bronze) at 125 kg
Win	35–11	(Ukraine) Oleksandr Khotsianivskyi	5–0	June 17–19, 2016	2016 Ziolkowski International	Spala, Poland
Win	34–11	(Egypt) Diaaeldin Kamal	5–0	June 17–19, 2016	2016 Ziolkowski International	Spala, Poland
Loss	33–11	(Russia) Mukhamagazi Magomedov	7–8	June 17–19, 2016	2016 Ziolkowski International	Spala, Poland
2016 US University Nationals (gold) at 125 kg
Win	33–10	(United States) Tanner Hall	4–1	June 2–6, 2016	2016 US University National Championships	(United States) Akron, Ohio
Win	32–10	(United States) Tanner Hall	3–1	June 2–6, 2016	2016 US University National Championships	(United States) Akron, Ohio
Win	31–10	(United States) Garrett Ryan	TF 10–0	June 2–6, 2016	2016 US University National Championships	(United States) Akron, Ohio
Win	30–10	(United States) Nolan Terrance	TF 12–2	June 2–6, 2016	2016 US University National Championships	(United States) Akron, Ohio
Win	29–10	(United States) Ben Tynan	TF 10–0	June 2–6, 2016	2016 US University National Championships	(United States) Akron, Ohio
Win	28–10	(United States) Billy Miller	TF 10–0	June 2–6, 2016	2016 US University National Championships	(United States) Akron, Ohio
Win	27–10	(United States) Louie Maser	TF 10–0	June 2–6, 2016	2016 US University National Championships	(United States) Akron, Ohio
2016 US Olympic Team Trials 4th at 125 kg
Loss	26–10	(United States) Dom Bradley	2–2	April 9, 2016	2016 US Olympic Team Trials	(United States) Iowa City, Iowa
Win	26–9	(United States) Bobby Telford	5–0	April 9, 2016	2016 US Olympic Team Trials	(United States) Iowa City, Iowa
Loss	25–9	(United States) Zach Rey	2–4	April 9, 2016	2016 US Olympic Team Trials	(United States) Iowa City, Iowa
Win	25–8	(United States) Justin Grant	4–1	April 9, 2016	2016 US Olympic Team Trials	(United States) Iowa City, Iowa
2015 Bill Farrell M. International (gold) at 125 kg
Win	24–8	(United States) Dom Bradley	1–0	November 5–7, 2015	2015 Bill Farrell Memorial International	(United States) New York, New York
Win	23–8	(United States) Anthony Nelson	TF 11–0	November 5–7, 2015	2015 Bill Farrell Memorial International	(United States) New York, New York
Win	22–8	(Russia) Pavel Krivtsov	11–6	November 5–7, 2015	2015 Bill Farrell Memorial International	(United States) New York, New York
Win	21–8	(United States) Justin Grant	4–2	November 5–7, 2015	2015 Bill Farrell Memorial International	(United States) New York, New York
2015 Spain Grand Prix (gold) at 125 kg
Win	20–8	(China) Deng Zhiwei	Fall	July 11, 2015	2015 Grand Prix of Spain	Madrid, Spain
Win	19–8	(Iran) Mehdi Gonbadani	TF 14–4	July 11, 2015	2015 Grand Prix of Spain	Madrid, Spain
Win	18–8	(Poland) Kamil Kościółek	TF 10–0	July 11, 2015	2015 Grand Prix of Spain	Madrid, Spain
Win	17–8	(Spain) Jose Cuba	TF 10–0	July 11, 2015	2015 Grand Prix of Spain	Madrid, Spain
2015 US World Team Trials 4th at 125 kg
Loss	16–8	(United States) Dom Bradley	1–2	June 12–14, 2015	2015 US World Team Trials	(United States) Madison, Wisconsin
Win	16–7	(United States) Tyrell Fortune	5–0	June 12–14, 2015	2015 US World Team Trials	(United States) Madison, Wisconsin
Win	15–7	(United States) Adam Coon	TF 12–2	June 12–14, 2015	2015 US World Team Trials	(United States) Madison, Wisconsin
Loss	14–7	(United States) Zach Rey	1–7	June 12–14, 2015	2015 US World Team Trials	(United States) Madison, Wisconsin
Win	14–6	(United States) Connor Medbery	6–4	June 12–14, 2015	2015 US World Team Trials	(United States) Madison, Wisconsin
2015 US Nationals 4th at 125 kg
Win	13–6	(United States) Chadwick Hanke	Fall	May 7–9, 2015	2015 US National Championships	(United States) Las Vegas, Nevada
Loss	12–6	(United States) Tervel Dlagnev	2–8	May 7–9, 2015	2015 US National Championships	(United States) Las Vegas, Nevada
Win	12–5	(United States) Dom Bradley	4–4	May 7–9, 2015	2015 US National Championships	(United States) Las Vegas, Nevada
Win	11–5	(United States) Michael Graves	TF 10–0	May 7–9, 2015	2015 US National Championships	(United States) Las Vegas, Nevada
2014 US World Team Trials 4th at 125 kg
Loss	10–5	(United States) Tyrell Fortune	TF 0–10	May 29 – June 1, 2014	2014 US World Team Trials	(United States) Madison, Wisconsin
Loss	10–4	(United States) Zach Rey	3–9	May 29 – June 1, 2014	2014 US World Team Trials	(United States) Madison, Wisconsin
Win	10–3	(United States) Dom Bradley	9–9	May 29 – June 1, 2014	2014 US World Team Trials	(United States) Madison, Wisconsin
Win	9–3	(United States) Jarod Trice	4–4	May 29 – June 1, 2014	2014 US World Team Trials	(United States) Madison, Wisconsin
2013 US University Nationals (bronze) at 120 kg
Win	8–3	(United States) Austin Marsden	7–5	May 24–26, 2013	2013 US University National Championships	(United States) Akron, Ohio
Win	7–3	(United States) Connor Medbery	10–8	May 24–26, 2013	2013 US University National Championships	(United States) Akron, Ohio
Loss	6–3	(United States) Tyrell Fortune	0–8	May 24–26, 2013	2013 US University National Championships	(United States) Akron, Ohio
Win	6–2	(United States) Michael Kroells	TF 16–4	May 24–26, 2013	2013 US University National Championships	(United States) Akron, Ohio
Win	5–2	(United States) Connor Medbery	12–9	May 24–26, 2013	2013 US University National Championships	(United States) Akron, Ohio
Win	4–2	(United States) Jeremy Johnson	14–9	May 24–26, 2013	2013 US University National Championships	(United States) Akron, Ohio
2013 US Open 7th at 120 kg
Win	3–2	(United States) Jeremy Johnson	3–1, 4–0	April 17–20, 2013	2013 US Open National Championships	(United States) Las Vegas, Nevada
Loss	2–2	(United States) Tyrell Fortune	2–4, 3–5	April 17–20, 2013	2013 US Open National Championships	(United States) Las Vegas, Nevada
Win	2–1	(United States) Riley Orozco	4–3, 3–0	April 17–20, 2013	2013 US Open National Championships	(United States) Las Vegas, Nevada
Loss	1–1	(United States) Dom Bradley	0–3, 0–2	April 17–20, 2013	2013 US Open National Championships	(United States) Las Vegas, Nevada
Win	1–0	(United States) David Lopez	8–3, 6–0	April 17–20, 2013	2013 US Open National Championships	(United States) Las Vegas, Nevada
