= 2019 World Wrestling Championships – Men's freestyle 125 kg =

Men's freestyle 125 kg at the 2019 World Championships
- Venue: Barys Arena
- Dates: 20–21 September 2019
- Competitors: 28 from 28 nations

Medalists
| gold medal | Geno Petriashvili | Georgia |
| silver medal | Taha Akgül | Turkey |
| bronze medal | Oleksandr Khotsianivskyi | Ukraine |
| bronze medal | Deng Zhiwei | China |

The men's freestyle 125 kilograms is a competition featured at the 2019 World Wrestling Championships, and was held in Nur-Sultan, Kazakhstan on 20 and 21 September.

This freestyle wrestling competition consists of a single-elimination tournament, with a repechage used to determine the winner of two bronze medals. The two finalists face off for gold and silver medals. Each wrestler who loses to one of the two finalists moves into the repechage, culminating in a pair of bronze medal matches featuring the semifinal losers each facing the remaining repechage opponent from their half of the bracket.

== Results ==
Legend

- C — Won by 3 cautions given to the opponent
- F — Won by fall

=== Final ===
| Final |
| Geno Petriashvili (GEO) | 6 |
| Taha Akgül (TUR) | 6 |

=== Top half ===
Round of 32
Egzon Shala (KOS) | 4^{F}
Jere Heino (FIN) | 7
Johannes Ludescher (AUT) | 4
José Cuba (ESP) | 0
Badzha Khutaba (SYR) | 12
Jung Yei-hyun (KOR) | 2
Levan Berianidze (ARM) | 2
Oleksandr Khotsianivskyi (UKR) | 3
Oleg Boltin (KAZ) | 4
Alan Khugaev (RUS) | 7
Yadollah Mohebbi (IRI) | 6
Dorjkhandyn Khüderbulga (MGL) | 1

Round of 16
Geno Petriashvili (GEO) | 13
Egzon Shala (KOS) | 2
Johannes Ludescher (AUT) | 2
Badzha Khutaba (SYR) | 6
Oleksandr Khotsianivskyi (UKR) | 4
Alan Khugaev (RUS) | 3
Yadollah Mohebbi (IRI) | 5
Nick Gwiazdowski (USA) | 2

Quarterfinals
Geno Petriashvili (GEO) | 14
Badzha Khutaba (SYR) | 4
Oleksandr Khotsianivskyi (UKR) | 3
Yadollah Mohebbi (IRI) | 2

Semifinals
Geno Petriashvili (GEO) | 6
Oleksandr Khotsianivskyi (UKR) | 2

=== Bottom half ===
Round of 32
Nobuyoshi Arakida (JPN) | 0
Alexander Romanov (MDA) | 8^{C}
Dániel Ligeti (HUN) | 2
Sumit Malik (IND) | 0
Khasanboy Rakhimov (UZB) | 10
Luis Vivenes (VEN) | 0
Vitali Piasniak (BLR) | 1
Jamaladdin Magomedov (AZE) | 9
Khaled Omr Abdalla (EGY) | 3
Nick Matuhin (GER) | 7
Robert Baran (POL) | 3
Korey Jarvis (CAN) | 0

Round of 16
Taha Akgül (TUR) | 8
Alexander Romanov (MDA) | 0
Dániel Ligeti (HUN) | 0
Khasanboy Rakhimov (UZB) | 5^{F}
Jamaladdin Magomedov (AZE) | 5
Nick Matuhin (GER) | 1
Robert Baran (POL) | 1
Deng Zhiwei (CHN) | 4

Quarterfinals
Taha Akgül (TUR) | 3
Khasanboy Rakhimov (UZB) | 0
Jamaladdin Magomedov (AZE) | 0
Deng Zhiwei (CHN) | 3

Semifinals
Taha Akgül (TUR) | 5
Deng Zhiwei (CHN) | 0

=== Repechage ===
Repechage round 2
Egzon Shala (KOS) | 9
Badzha Khutaba (SYR) | 14
Alexander Romanov (MDA) | 0
Khasanboy Rakhimov (UZB) | 6

Bronze medals
Badzha Khutaba (SYR) | 1
Oleksandr Khotsianivskyi (UKR) | 5
Khasanboy Rakhimov (UZB) | 6
Deng Zhiwei (CHN) | 1

- Khasanboy Rakhimov of Uzbekistan originally won the bronze medal, but was disqualified after he tested positive for doping. Deng Zhiwei was raised to third and took the bronze medal. Badzha Khutaba from Syria who originally finished 5th also failed the doping test, their Olympic quotas were transferred to Yadollah Mohebbi of Iran and Egzon Shala of Kosovo.
