= 2010 World Wrestling Championships – Men's freestyle 120 kg =

Men's freestyle 120 kg at the 2010 World Championships
- Venue: Olympic Stadium
- Dates: 12 September 2010
- Competitors: 28 from 28 nations

Medalists
gold medal	Bilyal Makhov	Russia
silver medal	Artur Taymazov	Uzbekistan
bronze medal	Levan Berianidze	Georgia
bronze medal	Ioannis Arzoumanidis	Greece

The men's freestyle 120 kilograms is a competition featured at the 2010 World Wrestling Championships, and was held at the Olympic Stadium in Moscow, Russia on 12 September.

This freestyle wrestling competition consists of a single-elimination tournament, with a repechage used to determine the winner of two bronze medals.

== Results ==
Legend

- F — Won by fall

=== Final ===
Final
Bilyal Makhov (RUS)	1	1
Artur Taymazov (UZB)	0	0

=== Top half ===
Round of 32
Dimitar Kumchev (BUL)	1	2	2
Antoine Jaoude (BRA)	2	0	0
Ruslan Basiev (ARM)	0	0
Fardin Masoumi (IRI)	5	1
Takahiro Shimonaka (JPN)	0	0
Marid Mutalimov (KAZ)	1	4^{F}
Bartłomiej Bartnicki (POL)	0	0
Levan Berianidze (GEO)	1	3

Round of 16
Luis Vivenes (VEN)	0	0
Bilyal Makhov (RUS)	4	5
Dmitrijs Mihailovs (LAT)	0	0
Dániel Ligeti (HUN)	6	6
Dimitar Kumchev (BUL)	0	0
Fardin Masoumi (IRI)	2	7
Marid Mutalimov (KAZ)	1	0	0
Levan Berianidze (GEO)	0	1	3

Quarterfinals
Bilyal Makhov (RUS)	5	2
Dániel Ligeti (HUN)	3	1
Fardin Masoumi (IRI)	1	0	0
Levan Berianidze (GEO)	0	1	2

Semifinals
Bilyal Makhov (RUS)	3	2
Levan Berianidze (GEO)	1	0

=== Bottom half ===
Round of 32
Hugues Onanena (CMR)	0	0
Ali Isayev (AZE)	2	5
Andrei Podsevalnicov (MDA)	3^{F}
Aparian Varntan (CYP)	2
Artur Taymazov (UZB)	1	1
Vadim Tasoyev (UKR)	0	0
Fatih Çakıroğlu (TUR)	0	0
Aleksey Shemarov (BLR)	1	1
Les Sigman (USA)	4^{F}
Nick Lane (NZL)	0
Aiaal Lazarev (KGZ)	0	4	0
Ioannis Arzoumanidis (GRE)	1	1	1
Arjan Bhullar (CAN)	1	0	0
Deng Zhiwei (CHN)	0	2	1
Jargalsaikhany Chuluunbat (MGL)	2	1
José Cuba (ESP)	0	0

Round of 16
Ali Isayev (AZE)	3	4
Andrei Podsevalnicov (MDA)	0	0
Artur Taymazov (UZB)	2	3
Aleksey Shemarov (BLR)	0	0
Les Sigman (USA)	0	1	0
Ioannis Arzoumanidis (GRE)	1	0	1
Deng Zhiwei (CHN)	4	0	1
Jargalsaikhany Chuluunbat (MGL)	0	1	0

Quarterfinals
Ali Isayev (AZE)	0	3	0
Artur Taymazov (UZB)	1	2	1
Ioannis Arzoumanidis (GRE)	4^{F}
Deng Zhiwei (CHN)	1

Semifinals
Artur Taymazov (UZB)	3	3
Ioannis Arzoumanidis (GRE)	0	1

=== Repechage ===
Repechage round 1
Vadim Tasoyev (UKR)	3	0	0
Aleksey Shemarov (BLR)	1	1	1

Repechage round 2
Luis Vivenes (VEN)	0	1
Dániel Ligeti (HUN)	3	3
Aleksey Shemarov (BLR)	0	0
Ali Isayev (AZE)	1	6

Bronze medals
Dániel Ligeti (HUN)	3	0	0
Levan Berianidze (GEO)	0	1	4
Ali Isayev (AZE)	0	0
Ioannis Arzoumanidis (GRE)	1	1
