= 2018 World Wrestling Championships – Men's freestyle 125 kg =

Men's freestyle 125 kg at the 2018 World Championships
- Venue: László Papp Budapest Sports Arena
- Dates: 20–21 October 2018
- Competitors: 22 from 22 nations

Medalists
gold medal	Geno Petriashvili	Georgia
silver medal	Deng Zhiwei	China
bronze medal	Nick Gwiazdowski	United States
bronze medal	Parviz Hadi	Iran

The men's freestyle 125 kilograms is a competition featured at the 2018 World Wrestling Championships, and was held in Budapest, Hungary on 20 and 21 October.

This freestyle wrestling competition consists of a single-elimination tournament, with a repechage used to determine the winner of two bronze medals. The two finalists face off for gold and silver medals. Each wrestler who loses to one of the two finalists moves into the repechage, culminating in a pair of bronze medal matches featuring the semifinal losers each facing the remaining repechage opponent from their half of the bracket.

== Results ==
Legend

- F — Won by fall

=== Final ===
Final
Deng Zhiwei (CHN)	0
Geno Petriashvili (GEO)	6

=== Top half ===
Round of 32

Round of 16
Nick Gwiazdowski (USA)	9
Natsagsürengiin Zolboo (MGL)	4
Amar Dhesi (CAN)	1
Deng Zhiwei (CHN)	4
Sumit Malik (IND)	4
Taiki Yamamoto (JPN)	1
Andrei Romanov (MDA)	1
Yermukambet Inkar (KAZ)	9

Quarterfinals
Nick Gwiazdowski (USA)	4
Deng Zhiwei (CHN)	5
Sumit Malik (IND)	6
Yermukambet Inkar (KAZ)	1

Semifinals
Deng Zhiwei (CHN)	5
Sumit Malik (IND)	0

=== Bottom half ===
Round of 32
Johannes Ludescher (AUT)	1
Dániel Ligeti (HUN)	6
Catriel Muriel (ARG)	8^{F}
Florian Skilang Temengil (PLW)	7
Nam Kyung-jin (KOR)	1
Anzor Khizriev (RUS)	4^{F}
Parviz Hadi (IRI)	11
Robert Baran (POL)	0
Ibrahim Saidau (BLR)	4
Jamaladdin Magomedov (AZE)	3
Nick Matuhin (GER)	0
Taha Akgül (TUR)	9

Round of 16
Geno Petriashvili (GEO)	11
Dániel Ligeti (HUN)	1
Catriel Muriel (ARG)	2
Anzor Khizriev (RUS)	12
Parviz Hadi (IRI)	11
Ibrahim Saidau (BLR)	2
Taha Akgül (TUR)	7
Oleksandr Khotsianivskyi (UKR)	0

Quarterfinals
Geno Petriashvili (GEO)	8
Anzor Khizriev (RUS)	5
Parviz Hadi (IRI)	3
Taha Akgül (TUR)	2

Semifinals
Geno Petriashvili (GEO)	13
Parviz Hadi (IRI)	6

=== Repechage ===
Repechage round 2
Amar Dhesi (CAN)	0
Nick Gwiazdowski (USA)	7
Dániel Ligeti (HUN)	6
Anzor Khizriev (RUS)	10

Bronze medals
Nick Gwiazdowski (USA)	7
Sumit Malik (IND)	2
Anzor Khizriev (RUS)	2
Parviz Hadi (IRI)	11
