= 2016 World Wrestling Clubs Cup – Men's freestyle =

2016 World Wrestling Clubs Cup
- Host city: Kharkiv, Ukraine
- Dates: November 30 – December 1, 2016

Champions

The 2016 World Wrestling Clubs Cup – Men's freestyle was the last of a set of three World Wrestling Clubs Cups in 2016.

== Pool stage ==
Team competes for Semifinals
Team competes for 5th-8th place
Team competes for 9th-12th place

=== Pool A ===
Team	Pld	W	L
(United States) Titan Mercury	2	2	0
(Georgia (country)) Champion	2	1	1
(Ukraine) CSKA	2	0	2

POOL A
Round I

(Ukraine) CSKA 3 - 5 (Georgia (country)) Champion
57 kg – Taras Markovich 7 - 8 Beka Buyiashvili

61 kg – Ivan Bileychyk 4 - 4 Shota Phartenadze

65 kg – Gor Oganesyan 4 - 3 Levan kelekhsashvili

70 kg – Vasil Mikhailov 10 - 6 Aleksandre Yatchvadze

74 kg – Rustam Dudaiev 6 - 10 Avtandil Kenchadze

86 kg – Dmytro Rochniak 6 - 8 Nodar Egadze

97 kg – Andriy Vlasov 0 - 11 Elizbar Odikadze

125 kg – Oleksandr Khotsianivskiy 2 - 3 Giorgi Meshvildishvili

Round II

(United States) Titan Mercury 7 - 1 (Ukraine) CSKA
57 kg – Nicholas Megaludis 9 - 0 Taras Markovich

61 kg – Vladimer Khinchegashvili 8 - 0 Ivan Bileychyk

65 kg – Bernard Futrell 10 - 0 Aleksey Boruta

70 kg – Nazar Kulchystky 10 - 5 Vasil Mikhailov

74 kg – Alex Dieringer 10 - 0 Ruslan Rychko

86 kg – David Taylor 2 - 6 Dmytro Rochniak

97 kg – Kyle Snyder 7 - 0 Andriy Vlasov

125 kg – Nick Gwiazdowski 2 - 1 Oleksandr Khotsianivskiy

Round III

(Georgia (country)) Champion 3 - 5 (United States) Titan Mercury
57 kg – Beka Buyiashvili 2 - 12 Nicholas Megaludis

61 kg – Shota Phartenadze 8 - 10 Vladimer Khinchegashvili

65 kg – Levan kelekhsashvili 1 - 4 Bernard Futrell

70 kg – Aleksandre Yatchvadze 3 - 1 Nazar Kulchystky

74 kg – Avtandil Kenchadze 0 - 13 Alex Dieringer

86 kg – Nika Kentchadze 6 - 5^{F} David Taylor

97 kg – Elizbar Odikadze 2 - 2 Kyle Snyder

125 kg – Giorgi Meshvildishvili 5 - 4 Nick Gwiazdowski

=== Pool B ===
Team	Pld	W	L
(Ukraine) Zd	2	2	0
Mongolia	2	1	1
Belarus	2	0	2

POOL B
Round I

(Ukraine) Zd 8 - 0 Mongolia
57 kg – Petr Bileichuk 10 - 0 Zanabazar Zandanbud

61 kg – Vasyl Shuptar 11 - 0 Sarmandakh Bilguun

65 kg – Andriy Kvyatkovskyy 10 - 0 Khishigbat Khuyagtbaatar

70 kg – 'Semen Radulov' 10 - 0 Khatanbaatar Davaatseren

74 kg – 'Giya Chykhladze' 8.df - 8 Batchuluuny Ankhbayar

86 kg – Bogdan Bohdan 10 - 0 Mungushagai Tumurbat

97 kg – Murazi Mchelidze 8 - 6 Batsul Ulzisaikhan

125 kg – Alen Zasyeyev 6 - 1 Natsagsürengiin Zolboo

Round II

Belarus 0 - 8 (Ukraine) Zd
57 kg – Evgeni Rebikov 2 - 12 Andriy Yatsenko

61 kg – Artiom Krauchanka 0 - 12 Vasyl Shuptar

65 kg – Uladzislau Zharykau 0 - 10 Andriy Kvyatkovskyy

70 kg – Aleksander Hryharovich 0 - 10 Semen Radulov

74 kg – .df Giya Chykhladze

86 kg – Andrey Kavalevski 2 - 6 Djafarian Mraz

97 kg – Vladimir Yezapenkov 2 - 12 Murazi Mchelidze

125 kg – Vadim Shvedov 5 - 9 Danilo Kartavyi

Round III

Mongolia 5 - 3 Belarus

=== Pool C ===
Team	Pld	W	L
(Iran) Bimeh Razi	2	2	0
(Hungary) Csepeli Birkozo	1	0	1
Kyrgyzstan	1	0	1

POOL C
Round I

(Iran) Bimeh Razi 8 - 0 (Hungary) Csepeli Birkozo
57 kg – Younes Sarmasti 10 - 0 Ali Hajaghania

61 kg – Masoud Esmaeilpour 9 - 0 Hassan Moradgoly

65 kg – Ilyas Bekbulatov 10 - 0 Norbert Lukacs

70 kg – Atsamaz Sanakoev

74 kg – 'Reza Afzali' 11 - 0 Lukacs Botond

86 kg – Alireza Karimi 10 - 0 Gergely Gyurits

97 kg – Abbas Tahan 10 - 0 Attila Szmik

125 kg – Parviz Hadi 9 - 2 Dániel Ligeti

Round II

Kyrgyzstan 0 - 8 (Iran) Bimeh Razi
57 kg – Zhalnak Turgunbaev 0 - 12 Younes Sarmasti

61 kg – Baktybek Ulu 0 - 10 Masoud Esmaeilpour

65 kg – Bakbergen Usenov 0 - 10 Ilyas Bekbulatov

70 kg – N Askarbekov 0 - 6 Atsamaz Sanakoev

74 kg – Oibek Nasirov 0 - 10 Bahman Teymouri

86 kg – Chingiz Kerimkulov 0 - 10 Alireza Karimi

97 kg – Kantoro Talantbek Uulu 0 - 10 Abbas Tahan

125 kg – Kasmanbetov 0 - 10 Parviz Hadi

Round III

(Hungary) Csepeli Birkozo - Kyrgyzstan

=== Pool D ===
Team	Pld	W	L
Armenia	2	2	0
(Iran) Setaregan Sari	2	1	1
(Turkey) Istanbul Sanc	2	0	2

POOL D
Round I

(Iran) Setaregan Sari 3 - 5 Armenia
57 kg – Sayed Mostafa Damadi 0 - 10 Narek Hovhannisyan

61 kg – Mehran Sheikhi 10 - 0 Garik Barseghyan

65 kg – Sajjad Zabihi 6 - 16 Narek Sirunyan

70 kg – Sobhan Mohammadzadeh 1 - 10won by Fall Valter Margaryan

74 kg – Saeb Kalantari 0 - 10 Suren Khachatryan

86 kg – Kianoush Naderi 7 - 10 Vahe Tamrazyan

97 kg – Elias Bakhtiyari 13 - 7 Shamir Atyan

125 kg – Jaber Sadeghzadeh 12 - 1 Andranik Galstyan

Round II

(Turkey) Istanbul Sanc 4 - 4.df (Iran) Setaregan Sari
57 kg – Nebi Uzun 7 - 1 Sayed Mostafa Damadi

61 kg – Emin Ogut 2 - 11 Mehran Sheikhi

65 kg – Burak Dogan 4 - 9 Gholamreza Abdollahpour

70 kg – Serdar Cavusoglu 7 - 2 Sobhan Mohammadzadeh

74 kg – Nuri Temur 10 - 0 Saeb Kalantari

86 kg – Firat Binici 13 - 3 Kianoush Naderi

97 kg – Elias Bakhtiyari 2 - 12 Elias Bakhtiyari

125 kg – Huseyin Civelek 0 - 10 Jaber Sadeghzadeh

Round III

Armenia 5 - 3 (Turkey) Istanbul Sanc

== Next level ==
Semi final
Semi final

(Iran) Bimeh Razi 8 - 0 Armenia

(United States) Titan Mercury 4.df - 4 (Ukraine) Zd

Classification 2nd places

(Hungary) Csepeli Birkozo 1 - 7 (Iran) Setaregan Sari

(Georgia (country)) Champion 7 - 1 Mongolia

Classification 3rd places

Kyrgyzstan 2 - 6 (Turkey) Istanbul Sanc

(Ukraine) CSKA 8 - 0 Belarus

Final
Final 1-2

(United States) Titan Mercury 5 - 3 (Iran) Bimeh Razi

Final 3-4

(Ukraine) Zd 6 - 2 Armenia

'Final 5-6'

(Georgia (country)) Champion 7 - 1 (Iran) Setaregan Sari

'Final 7-8'

Mongolia 5 - 3 (Hungary) Csepeli Birkozo

'Final 9-10'

(Ukraine) CSKA 5 - 3 (Turkey) Istanbul Sanc

'Final 11-12'

Belarus 3 - 5 Kyrgyzstan

== Final ranking ==
Rank	Team	Pld	W	L
1	(United States) Titan Mercury	4	4	0
2	(Iran) Bimeh Razi	4	3	1
3	(Ukraine) Zd	4	3	1
4	Armenia	4	2	2
5	(Georgia (country)) Champion	4	3	1
6	(Iran) Setaregan Sari	4	2	2
7	Mongolia	4	2	2
8	(Hungary) Csepeli Birkozo	4	1	3
9	(Ukraine) CSKA	4	2	2
10	(Turkey) Istanbul Sanc	4	1	3
11	Kyrgyzstan	4	1	3
12	Belarus	4	0	4

== See also ==
- 2016 Wrestling World Cup - Men's Greco-Roman
- 2016 Wrestling World Cup - Men's freestyle
