= Geno Petriashvili =

Georgian freestyle wrestler

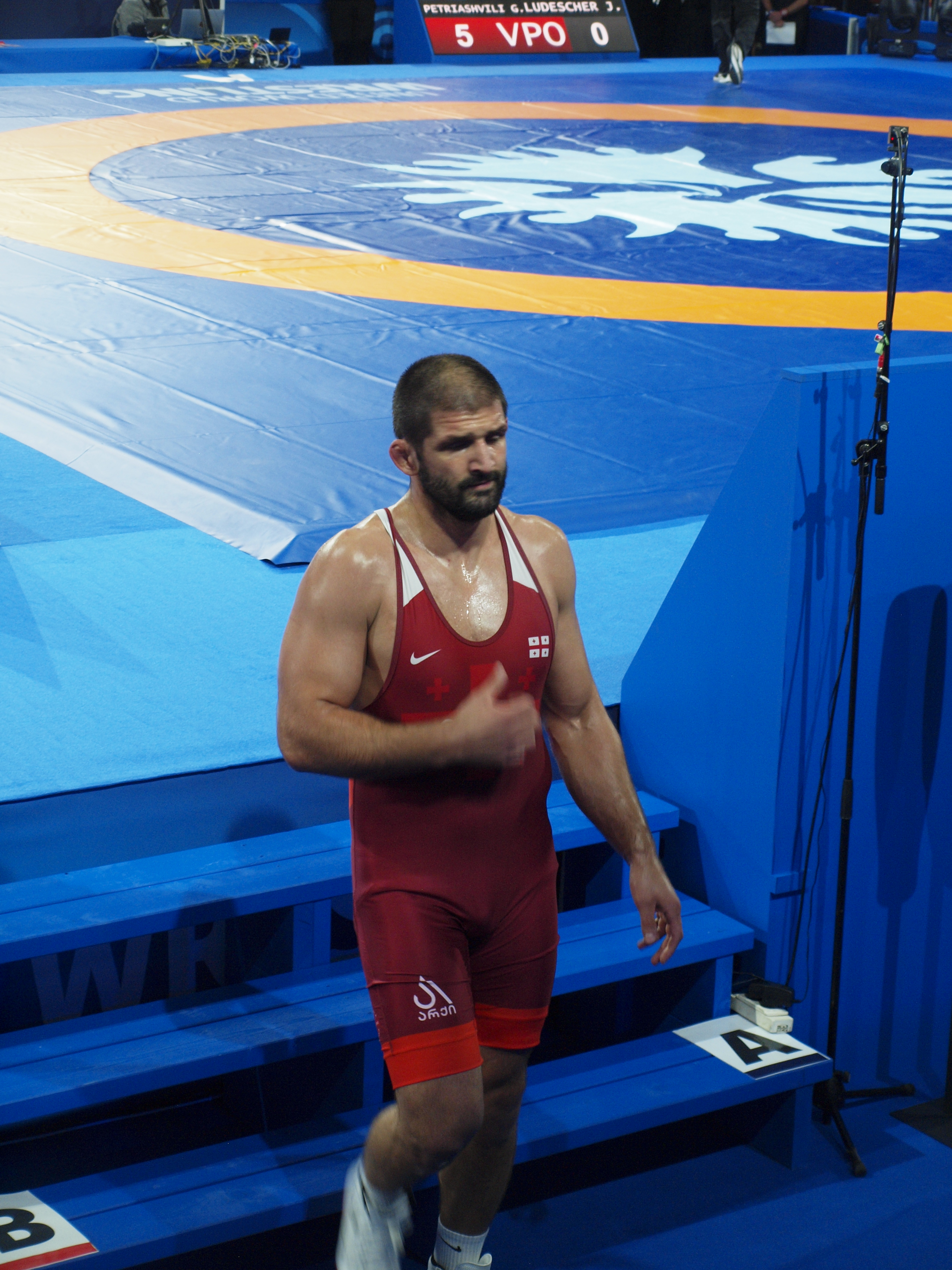
- Petraishvili in the 2021 Oslo World Championships

Personal information
- Born: 1 April 1994 (age 32) Gori, Georgia
- Height: 198 cm (6 ft 6 in)
- Weight: 125 kg (276 lb)

Sport
- Sport: Wrestling
- Event: Freestyle
- Club: Dynamo Tbilisi
- Coached by: Nugzar Skhireli (personal); Revaz Kobakhidze (national); Easy Pipe Kashan (2017); Atrak Bojnord (2019)
Medal record
| Event | 1st | 2nd | 3rd |
|---|---|---|---|
| Olympic Games | 1 | 1 | 1 |
| World Championships | 3 | 2 | 3 |
| European Championships | 2 | 5 | 3 |
| European Games | 0 | 0 | 1 |
| World Cup | 0 | 0 | 1 |
| Other | 22 | 1 | 3 |
| Total | 28 | 9 | 12 |
Men's freestyle wrestling
Representing Georgia
Olympic Games
| Gold medal – first place | 2024 Paris | 125 kg |
| Silver medal – second place | 2020 Tokyo | 125 kg |
| Bronze medal – third place | 2016 Rio de Janeiro | 125 kg |
World Championships
| Gold medal – first place | 2017 Paris | 125 kg |
| Gold medal – first place | 2018 Budapest | 125 kg |
| Gold medal – first place | 2019 Nur-Sultan | 125 kg |
| Silver medal – second place | 2021 Oslo | 125 kg |
| Silver medal – second place | 2023 Belgrade | 125 kg |
| Bronze medal – third place | 2013 Budapest | 120 kg |
| Bronze medal – third place | 2015 Las Vegas | 125 kg |
| Bronze medal – third place | 2022 Belgrade | 125 kg |
European Championships
| Gold medal – first place | 2016 Riga | 125 kg |
| Gold medal – first place | 2020 Rome | 125 kg |
| Silver medal – second place | 2018 Kaspiysk | 125 kg |
| Silver medal – second place | 2019 Bucharest | 125 kg |
| Silver medal – second place | 2022 Budapest | 125 kg |
| Silver medal – second place | 2023 Zagreb | 125 kg |
| Silver medal – second place | 2024 Bucharest | 125 kg |
| Bronze medal – third place | 2013 Tbilisi | 120 kg |
| Bronze medal – third place | 2017 Novi Sad | 125 kg |
| Bronze medal – third place | 2021 Warsaw | 125 kg |
European Games
| Bronze medal – third place | 2015 Baku | 125 kg |
World Cup
| Bronze medal – third place | 2016 Los Angeles | Team |
Golden Grand Prix
| Gold medal – first place | 2015 Baku | 125 kg |
| Gold medal – first place | 2016 Baku | 125 kg |
Grand Prix
| Gold medal – first place | 2015 Olympia | 125 kg |
| Gold medal – first place | 2015 Warsaw | 125 kg |
| Gold medal – first place | 2016 Minsk | 125 kg |
| Gold medal – first place | 2017 Paris | 125 kg |
| Gold medal – first place | 2017 Tbilisi | 125 kg |
| Gold medal – first place | 2018 Tbilisi | 125 kg |
| Gold medal – first place | 2018 Vladikavkas | 125 kg |
| Gold medal – first place | 2019 Tbilisi | 125 kg |
| Gold medal – first place | 2021 Nice | 125 kg |
| Gold medal – first place | 2022 Rome | 125 kg |
| Gold medal – first place | 2022 Tunis | 125 kg |
| Gold medal – first place | 2023 Bishkek | 125 kg |
| Silver medal – second place | 2013 Moscow | 120 kg |
| Silver medal – second place | 2018 Kiev | 125 kg |
| Bronze medal – third place | 2024 Budapest | 125 kg |
Dan Kolov - Nikola Petrov Tournament
| Gold medal – first place | 2018 Sofia | 125 kg |
World U23 Championships
| Gold medal – first place | 2017 Bydgoszcz | 125 kg |
European U23 Championship
| Gold medal – first place | 2016 Russe | 125 kg |
| Gold medal – first place | 2017 Szombathely | 125 kg |
World Juniors Championships
| Gold medal – first place | 2013 Sofia | 120 kg |
| Bronze medal – third place | 2012 Pattaya | 120 kg |
European Juniors Championships
| Gold medal – first place | 2014 Katowice | 120 kg |
| Gold medal – first place | 2013 Skopje | 120 kg |
| Bronze medal – third place | 2011 Zrenjanin | 120 kg |
World Cadets Championships
| Silver medal – second place | 2011 Szombathely | 100 kg |
European Cadets Championships
| Gold medal – first place | 2011 Warsaw | 100 kg |

Geno Petriashvili (Georgian: გენო პეტრიაშვილი; born 1 April 1994) is a Georgian heavyweight freestyle wrestler. He is European champion in 2016 and 2020 and world champion in 2017, 2018 and 2019, as well as the bronze medalist at the 2016 Olympic Games in Rio de Janeiro, the silver medalist at the 2020 Olympic Games in Tokyo, and the gold medalist at the 2024 Olympic Games in Paris.

== Biography ==
Geno Petriashvili was born in 1994 in Gori, Georgia. His father was a local businessowner Spartak Petriashvili. 19 August 2005, when Geno was 11, he was kidnapped by two perpetrators in the village of Nuli in the disputed Tskhinvali region of Georgia. During the investigation the Ministry of Internal Affairs of Georgia has accused the Russian peacekeeping force of covering for the criminals because the Georgian police force was not allowed to pursue the perpetrators. Geno was released from captivity by the police after 3 months, 25 November 2005.

In 2010, he took part in the 2010 Summer Youth Olympics in Singapore, which was held for the first time, and finished in fourth place there in the weight category up to 100 kg behind Ali Magomedabirov, Azerbaijan and Abraham Conyedo, Cuba. In 2011, he won a bronze medal at the 2011 European Juniors Wrestling Championships in Zrenyanin behind Ihor Dzyatko of Belarus and Aslan Dzebishov of Azerbaijan. He then won his first international title in the 100 kg weight category at the 2011 European Cadets Wrestling Championships in Warsaw. He won there ahead of Ruslan Gadzhiyev from Azerbaijan. In the same age group, he then became vice world champion in Szombathely in August 2011. In the final he lost to Adam Coon from the USA.

In 2012, Geno Petriashvili suffered a disappointment at the 2012 European Juniors Wrestling Championships in Zagreb, where he only finished 10th in the heavyweight category. In September 2012, however, he won a bronze medal at the 2012 World Junior Wrestling Championships in Pattaya behind Magomedgazhi Nurasulov of Russia and Muradin Khushchev of Ukraine. In December 2012, he caused a minor sensation at the Georgian Senior Championships, where he won the heavyweight title. On the way to this success he beat, among others, the multiple medallist at world championships Davit Modzmanashvili and in the final fight also the older and more experienced Giorgi Sakandelidze.

In March 2013, he was therefore entered in 2013 European Wrestling Championships in Tbilisi. As the youngest participant in the heavyweight division, he did not disappoint at all there, but secured a bronze medal with victories over Boban Danov, Macedonia and Magomedgadji Nurasulov, a defeat against Alen Sasseyev, Ukraine and a victory over Nick Matuhin, Germany. Geno Petriashvili also won the same medal a few months later at the 2013 World Wrestling Championships in Budapest. There he defeated Hitender Beniwal, India and Rareș Chintoan, Romania, then lost to Khadzhimurat Gatsalov, Russia and secured the bronze medal by defeating Deng Zhiwei of China.

In 2014 Geno Petriashvili became 2014 European Juniors Wrestling Championships champion in Katowice. He defeated Yunus Emre Dede from Turkey in the final. He served a six-months suspension in 2014 after testing positive for the non-performance enhancing Preductal, which Petriashvili had been taking regularly since being kidnapped as a child.

In June 2015 he took part in the 2015 European Games in Baku. There he defeated Boban Danov from Macedonia and Oleksandr Khotsianivskyi, Ukraine, in the heavyweight division, then lost to former world champion Aleksey Shemarov from Belarus, but secured a bronze medal with a victory over Levan Berianidze from Armenia. He also won the same medal at 2015 World Wrestling Championships in Las Vegas in September 2015. There he defeated Korey Jarvis from Canada, Alen Zasyeyev from Ukraine and Aiaal Lazarev from Kyrgyzstan. In the semi-finals he lost to Jamaladdin Magomedov from Azerbaijan. He then defeated Jargalsaikhany Chuluunbat from Mongolia in the bronze medal match.

In March 2016, Geno Petriashvili won his first senior international championship title at 2016 European Wrestling Championships in Riga, he defeated multiple world champion Taha Akgül from Turkey on points (8:8) in his first fight in the heavyweight category. He also defeated Dániel Ligeti from Hungary, Alen Zasieiev and Robert Baran from Poland in the final fight, whom he even shouldered. He also represented the colours of Georgia at the 2016 Olympic Games in Rio de Janeiro. There he came to victories over Dimitar Kumchev from Bulgaria and Alen Zasyeyev. He suffered a very narrow defeat against Komeil Ghasemi from Iran with the score tied at 4:4. Geno Petriashvili then won another bronze medal with victories over Korey Jarvis from Canada and Tervel Dlagnev from the United States.

In August 2017, Geno Petriashvili became world champion for the first time in Paris at 2017 World Wrestling Championships. He defeated Anzor Khizriev of Russia, Korey Jarvis, Levan Berianidze of Armenia and reigning Olympic champion Taha Akgül of Turkey on the way to this success. While he defeated his first three opponents all early, his victory over Taha Akgül was close but deserved with 10:8 points. Three months later, Geno Petriashvili also became 2017 U23 World Wrestling Championships in Bydgoszcz. He defeated all his opponents early. They were Taiki Yamamoto from Japan, Hu Zhangxiang from China, Danilo Kartawii from Ukraine and Magomedamin Dibirov from Russia.

2018 European Wrestling Championships in Kaspijsk Geno Petriashvili met Taha Akgül again in the final fight. He lost this fight narrowly with 1:2 and therefore only came in 2nd place at this European Championship. However, at 2018 World Wrestling Championships in Budapest in October 2018, he repeated his title win of the previous year. He won over Dániel Ligeti, Hungary, Anzor Khizriev, Russia, Parviz Hadi, Iran and in the final over Deng Zhiwei from China, whom he beat safely with 6:0 techn. points. His main rival Taha Akgül had already failed in the quarter-finals against Parviz Hadi.

2018 European Wrestling Championships in Bucharest Geno Petriashvili reached the final with three wins against Taha Akgül, against whom, however, he had no chance on that day and lost clearly with 0:7. At 2019 World Wrestling Championships in Nur-Sultan Geno Petriashvili faced Taha Akgül again in the final. At first it looked as if he would lose to Taha Akgül again, as he did at the European Championships in Bucharest, because he was down 0:4 points at half-time. But then he managed to equalise 4:4 before Taha Akgül took the lead again with 6:4 points shortly before the end. With an energetic performance Geno Petriashvili managed to equalise 6:6 and therefore won on the basis of the last score.

At 2020 European Wrestling Championships in Rome, Geno Petriashvili became European Champion for the second time after 2016. On the way to this success he defeated four wrestlers, in the final the Pole Robert Baran.

Geno Petriashvili 2016 Olympic Games in Tokyo, a member of the freestyle wrestling team, won a silver medal at the 2020 Tokyo Olympics. He lost 10-8 American Gable Steveson in the last seconds.

He won one of the bronze medals in the men's 125 kg event at the 2022 World Wrestling Championships held in Belgrade, Serbia.

In 2023, He won the silver medal at the 2023 European Wrestling Championships in Zagreb, Croatia, losing 9–4 to Taha Akgül in the men's freestyle 125 kg final match.

He won the gold medal in the men's freestyle 125 kg event at the 2024 Summer Olympics in Paris, France.
