= 2017 World Wrestling Championships – Men's freestyle 125 kg =

Men's freestyle 125 kg at the 2017 World Championships
- Venue: AccorHotels Arena
- Dates: 25 August 2017
- Competitors: 24 from 24 nations

Medalists
gold medal	Geno Petriashvili	Georgia
silver medal	Taha Akgül	Turkey
bronze medal	Nick Gwiazdowski	United States
bronze medal	Levan Berianidze	Armenia

The men's freestyle 125 kilograms is a competition featured at the 2017 World Wrestling Championships, and was held in Paris, France on 25 August 2017.

This freestyle wrestling competition consisted of a single-elimination tournament, with a repechage used to determine the winners of two bronze medals.

== Results ==
Legend

- R — Retired
- WO — Won by walkover

=== Final ===
Final
Taha Akgül (TUR)	8
Geno Petriashvili (GEO)	10

=== Top half ===
Round of 32
Yadollah Mohebbi (IRI)	3
Davit Modzmanashvili (UZB)	2
Nick Gwiazdowski (USA)	10
Andrei Romanov (MDA)	0

Round of 16
Taha Akgül (TUR)	8
Natsagsürengiin Zolboo (MGL)	0
Jere Heino (FIN)	0
Nam Kyung-jin (KOR)	6
Alen Zaseyev (UKR)	2
Yadollah Mohebbi (IRI)	6
Nick Gwiazdowski (USA)	10
Dániel Ligeti (HUN)	1

Quarterfinals
Taha Akgül (TUR)	12
Nam Kyung-jin (KOR)	2
Yadollah Mohebbi (IRI)	4
Nick Gwiazdowski (USA)	5

Semifinals
Taha Akgül (TUR)	10
Nick Gwiazdowski (USA)	0

=== Bottom half ===
Round of 32
Daulet Shabanbay (KAZ)	10
Soslan Gaglojev (SVK)	11
Taiki Yamamoto (JPN)	10
Jiang Dezheng (CHN)	0
Robert Baran (POL)	6
Aiaal Lazarev (KGZ)	8
Diaaeldin Kamal (EGY)	3
Korey Jarvis (CAN)	12
Florian Skilang Temengil (PLW)	0
Fatjon Baro (ALB)	10
Sumit Malik (IND)	0
Anzor Khizriev (RUS)	4

Round of 16
Levan Berianidze (ARM)	WO
Soslan Gaglojev (SVK)
Taiki Yamamoto (JPN)	6
Aiaal Lazarev (KGZ)	16
Korey Jarvis (CAN)	13
Fatjon Baro (ALB)	5^{R}
Anzor Khizriev (RUS)	2
Geno Petriashvili (GEO)	13

Quarterfinals
Levan Berianidze (ARM)	4
Aiaal Lazarev (KGZ)	1
Korey Jarvis (CAN)	0
Geno Petriashvili (GEO)	10

Semifinals
Levan Berianidze (ARM)	2
Geno Petriashvili (GEO)	12

=== Repechage ===
Repechage round 2
Natsagsürengiin Zolboo (MGL)	17
Nam Kyung-jin (KOR)	11
Anzor Khizriev (RUS)	5
Korey Jarvis (CAN)	0

Bronze medals
Natsagsürengiin Zolboo (MGL)	1
Nick Gwiazdowski (USA)	5
Anzor Khizriev (RUS)	0
Levan Berianidze (ARM)	3
