= Golden Grand Prix Ivan Yarygin 2017 – Men's freestyle 125 kg =

The men's freestyle 125 kg is a competition featured at the Golden Grand Prix Ivan Yarygin 2017, and was held in Krasnoyarsk, Russia on January 28.

== Medalists ==
Gold	(North Ossetia–Alania) Alan Khugaev
Silver	(Chechnya) Anzor Boltukaev
Bronze	(Iran) Sadeghzadeh Jaber
Bronze	(Mongolia) Natsagsürengiin Zolboo

== Results ==
Legend

- F — Won by fall

=== Final ===
Final
(North Ossetia–Alania) Alan Khugaev	3
(Chechnya) Anzor Boltukaev	2

=== Top half ===
Round of 32

Round of 16
(Chechnya) Anzor Khizriev	1
(North Ossetia–Alania) Alan Khugaev	1
(Mongolia) Munkhtur Lkhagvagerel	2
(North Ossetia–Alania) Kazbek Khubulov	7
(China) Wurenbilige	1
(Irkutsk Oblast) Shamil Khakiev	12
(Iran) Sadeghzadeh Jaber	2
(North Ossetia–Alania) Btradz Gazzaev	2

Quarterfinals
(North Ossetia–Alania) Alan Khugaev	1
(North Ossetia–Alania) Kazbek Khubulov	1
(Irkutsk Oblast) Shamil Khakiev	4
(Iran) Sadeghzadeh Jaber	5

Semifinals
(North Ossetia–Alania) Alan Khugaev	1
(Iran) Sadeghzadeh Jaber	1

=== Bottom half ===
Round of 32
(Mongolia) Natsagsürengiin Zolboo	5
(North Ossetia–Alania) Vitaly Goloev	0
(Buryatia) Baldan Tsyzhipov	7
(Dagestan) Magomedmin Dibirov	4
(Krasnoyarsk Krai) Mukhamagazi Magomedov	6
(Chechnya) Zelimkhan Khizriev	7
(Kemerovo Oblast) Ostap Posenok	1
(Dagestan) Asadula Ibragimov	8
(Iran) Mousavikani Seyedreza	4
(North Ossetia–Alania) Atsamaz Gazzaev	3

Round of 16
(New York (state)) Nick Gwiazdowski	4
(Chechnya) Adlan Ibragimov	6
(Mongolia) Natsagsürengiin Zolboo	1
(Chechnya) Anzor Boltukaev	3
(Buryatia) Baldan Tsyzhipov	9
(Chechnya) Zelimkhan Khizriev	6
(Dagestan) Asadula Ibragimov	0
(Iran) Mousavikani Seyedreza	7

Quarterfinals
(Chechnya) Adlan Ibragimov	1
(Chechnya) Anzor Boltukaev	3
(Buryatia) Baldan Tsyzhipov	4
(Iran) Mousavikani Seyedreza	5

Semifinals
(Chechnya) Anzor Boltukaev	1
(Iran) Mousavikani Seyedreza	1

=== Repechage ===
Repechage round 1
-
-
-
-

Repechage round 2
(North Ossetia–Alania) Kazbek Khubulov	7
(Chechnya) Anzor Khizriev	6
(Mongolia) Natsagsürengiin Zolboo	3
(Chechnya) Adlan Ibragimov	1

Bronze medals
(North Ossetia–Alania) Kazbek Khubulov	2
(Iran) Sadeghzadeh Jaber	5
(Mongolia) Natsagsürengiin Zolboo	2
(Iran) Mousavikani Seyedreza	2
