= Wrestling at the 2015 Pan American Games – Men's freestyle 125 kg =

Men's Freestyle 125 kg at the 2015 Pan American Games
- Venue: Mississauga Sports Centre
- Dates: July 18
- Competitors: 8 from 8 nations

Medalists
Gold medal	Zach Rey	United States
Silver medal	Korey Jarvis	Canada
Bronze medal	Edgardo Lopez	Puerto Rico
Bronze medal	Andres Ramos	Cuba

The men's freestyle 125 kg competition of the Wrestling events at the 2015 Pan American Games in Toronto were held on July 18 at the Mississauga Sports Centre.

== Schedule ==
All times are Eastern Daylight Time (UTC-4).

Date	Time	Round
July 18, 2015	15:11	Quarterfinals
July 18, 2015	16:23	Semifinals
July 18, 2015	21:39	Bronze medal matches
July 18, 2015	21:57	Final

== Results ==
Legend

- F — Won by fall

=== Final ===
Quarterfinals		Semifinals		Finals
Edgardo Lopez (PUR)	0
Korey Jarvis (CAN)	10	Korey Jarvis (CAN)	10
Ivan Burtovoy (ARG)	0	Hugo De Oliveira (BRA)	0
Hugo De Oliveira (BRA)	11			Korey Jarvis (CAN)	0
Rene Silva (NCA)	0			Zach Rey (USA)	3
Zach Rey (USA)	4^{F}	Zach Rey (USA)	2
Luis Vivenes (VEN)	4	Andres Ramos (CUB)	0
Andres Ramos (CUB)	6

=== Repechage ===
Bronze medal match
Edgardo Lopez (PUR)	8
Hugo De Oliveira (BRA)	0
Rene Silva (NCA)	0
Andres Ramos (CUB)	10
