= Golden Grand Prix Ivan Yarygin 2018 – Men's freestyle 125 kg =

The men's freestyle 125 kg is a competition featured at the Golden Grand Prix Ivan Yarygin 2018, and was held in Krasnoyarsk, Russia on 27 January.

== Medalists ==
| Gold | (Kabardino-Balkaria) Muradin Kushkhov |
| Silver | (Chechnya) Anzor Khizriev |
| Bronze | (United States) Nick Gwiazdowski |
| Bronze | (Mongolia) Natsagsürengiin Zolboo |

== Results ==
Legend

- F — Won by fall
- WO — Won by walkover

=== Final ===
| Final |
| (Kabardino-Balkaria) Muradin Kushkhov | 1 |
| (Chechnya) Anzor Khizriev | 1 |

=== Top half ===
- qualification: Muradin Kushkhov of Kabardino-Balkaria def. Baldan Tsyzhipov of Buryatia (3-1)
- qualification: Alan Khugaev of North Ossetia-Alania def. Alan Khubaev of North Ossetia-Alania (3-0)

==== Section 1 ====
Round of 16

Round of 8
(China) Hu Zhanxiang | 0
(Kabardino-Balkaria) Muradin Kushkhov | 7
(North Ossetia–Alania) Alan Khugaev | 1
(United States) Nick Gwiazdowski | 6
(Greece) Konstantinos Lazos | 0
(Kazakhstan) Oleg Boltin | 10
(Turkmenistan) Zyýamuhammet Saparow | 1
(Mongolia) Mönkhtöriin Lkhagvagerel | 10

Quarterfinals
(Kabardino-Balkaria) Muradin Kushkhov | 3
(United States) Nick Gwiazdowski | 1
(Kazakhstan) Oleg Boltin | 2
(Mongolia) Mönkhtöriin Lkhagvagerel | 2

Semifinals
(Kabardino-Balkaria) Muradin Kushkhov | 10
(Mongolia) Mönkhtöriin Lkhagvagerel | 0

=== Bottom half ===
==== Section 2 ====
Qualification
(Kazakhstan) Rassul Khatayev | 2
(Chechnya) Anzor Khizriev | 7

Round of 8
(Mongolia) Enkhbaataryn Tögöldör | 1
(United States) Robert Telfrod | 7
(United States) Zach Rey | 5
(Tajikistan) Farkhod Anakulov | 1
(Turkey) Hüseyin Civelek | 0
(Cuba) Yudenny Alpajón | 10
(Mongolia) Natsagsürengiin Zolboo | 2
(Chechnya) Anzor Khizriev | 4

Quarterfinals
(United States) Robert Telfrod | 1
(United States) Zach Rey | 2
(Cuba) Yudenny Alpajón | 0
(Chechnya) Anzor Khizriev | 4

Semifinals
(United States) Zach Rey | 2
(Chechnya) Anzor Khizriev | 4

== Repechage ==
Repechage round 1
-
-
(Kazakhstan) Rassul Khatayev | 0
(Mongolia) Natsagsürengiin Zolboo | 5

Repechage round 2
(China) Hu Zhanxiang | 0
(United States) Nick Gwiazdowski | 7
(Mongolia) Natsagsürengiin Zolboo | 4
(Cuba) Yudenny Alpajón | 2

Bronze medals
(United States) Nick Gwiazdowski | 5
(Mongolia) Mönkhtöriin Lkhagvagerel | 1
(Mongolia) Natsagsürengiin Zolboo | 3
(United States) Zach Rey | 2
