= Yadollah Mohebbi =

Iranian freestyle wrestler

Personal information
- Born: 9 December 1993 (age 32) Kermanshah, Iran

Sport
- Country: Iran
- Sport: Amateur wrestling
- Weight class: 125 kg
- Event: Freestyle
Medal record
Men's freestyle wrestling
Representing Iran
Asian Championships
Gold medal – first place	2017 New Delhi	125 kg
Gold medal – first place	2019 Xi'an	125 kg
Gold medal – first place	2022 Ulaanbaatar	125 kg
Asian Indoor and Martial Arts Games
Bronze medal – third place	2017 Ashgabat	125 kg
Military World Games
Silver medal – second place	2019 Wuhan	125 kg
World Military Championships
Gold medal – first place	2018 Moscow	125 kg
Gold medal – first place	2021 Tehran	125 kg
Yasar Dogu Tournament
Silver medal – second place	2018 Istanbul	125 kg
Dan Kolov & Nikola Petrov Tournament
Bronze medal – third place	2022 Veliko Tarnovo	125 kg
Golden Grand Prix
Bronze medal – third place	2016 Baku	125 kg
Grand Prix
Gold medal – first place	2018 Moscow	125 kg
Gold medal – first place	2019 Kermanshah	125 kg
Silver medal – second place	2016 Tehran	125 kg
Silver medal – second place	2021 Tehran	125 kg
Bronze medal – third place	2015 Kermanshah	125 kg
Bronze medal – third place	2018 Tbilisi	125 kg
Bronze medal – third place	2020 Kermanshah	125 kg
World Club Championship
Gold medal – first place	2025 Tehran	Team

Yadollah "Shiravan" Mohebbi (Persian: یدالله محبی; born 9 December 1993) is an Iranian freestyle wrestler. He is a three-time gold medalist at the Asian Wrestling Championships in the men's 125 kg event, in 2017, 2019 and 2022.

== Career ==
He won the gold medal in the men's 125 kg at the 2017 Asian Wrestling Championships held in New Delhi, India. He competed in the men's 125 kg event at the 2017 World Wrestling Championships held in Paris, France. He won one of the bronze medals in his event at the 2017 Asian Indoor and Martial Arts Games held in Ashgabat, Turkmenistan.

In 2019, he competed in the men's 125 kg event at the World Wrestling Championships held in Nur-Sultan, Kazakhstan without winning a medal. He won his first match against Dorjkhandyn Khüderbulga of Mongolia and also his next match against Nick Gwiazdowski of the United States but he was then eliminated from the competition by Oleksandr Khotsianivskyi of Ukraine. Later that year, he represented Iran at the 2019 Military World Games held in Wuhan, China and he won the silver medal in the men's 125 kg event. In the final, he lost against Taha Akgül of Turkey.

He won the gold medal in his event at the 2022 Asian Wrestling Championships held in Ulaanbaatar, Mongolia.

== Personal life ==
He is a nephew of accomplished wrestlers Mohammad Hassan and Mohammad Hossein Mohebbi.

== Achievements ==
Year	Tournament	Location	Result	Event
2017	Asian Championships	New Delhi, India	1st	Freestyle 125 kg
2017	Asian Indoor and Martial Arts Games	Ashgabat, Turkmenistan	3rd	Freestyle 125 kg
2019	Asian Championships	Xi'an, China	1st	Freestyle 125 kg
2019	Military World Games	Wuhan, China	2nd	Freestyle 125 kg
2022	Asian Championships	Ulaanbaatar, Mongolia	1st	Freestyle 125 kg
