= Wrestling at the 2024 Summer Olympics – Men's freestyle 125 kg =

Men's freestyle 125 kg at the Games of the XXXIII Olympiad
- Venue: Grand Palais Éphémère
- Date: 9–10 August 2024
- Competitors: 16 from 16 nations

Medalists
1st place, gold medalist(s)		Geno Petriashvili	Georgia
2nd place, silver medalist(s)		Amir Hossein Zare	Iran
3rd place, bronze medalist(s)		Taha Akgül	Turkey
3rd place, bronze medalist(s)		Giorgi Meshvildishvili	Azerbaijan

Men's freestyle 125 kilograms competition at the 2024 Summer Olympics in Paris, France, took place on 9–10 August 2024 at the Grand Palais Éphémère in Champ de Mars.

== Background ==
This is the 14th appearance of men's freestyle super heavyweight event, debut in 1972, and it has appeared in every games since then.

- 1972-1984: +100kg
- 1988-2000: 130kg
- 2004-2012: 120kg
- 2016-current: 125kg

Returned silver medalist Geno Petriashvili won the event by beating 2020 bronze medalist Amir Hossein Zare in the final, the reigning 2016 champion and returned bronze medalist Taha Akgül and Giorgi Meshvildishvili won the bronze medals respectively.

== Format ==
This freestyle wrestling competition consists of a single-elimination tournament, with a repechage used to determine the winner of two bronze medals. The two finalists face off for gold and silver medals. Each wrestler who loses to one of the two finalists moves into the repechage, culminating in a pair of bronze medal matches featuring the semifinal losers each facing the remaining repechage opponent from their half of the bracket.

== Rules ==
A typical bout consists of two halves of three minutes each separated by a 30-second break. The two competitors compete on a mat, which is nine meters in diameter. Wrestlers try to score points by executing various legal maneuvers. Points ranging from one to five are awarded by the mat referee depending on the degree of difficulty of the maneuvers. Points are also awarded to the opponent in case of infractions such as illegal holds, passivity etc. A wrestler is automatically disqualified if three cautions are awarded during a bout. Forcing an opponent's shoulders to the mat results in an instant victory by fall.

During the course of a match, if a wrestler builds a 10-point advantage over the opponent, the bout is stopped and the leader is declared as the winner by technical superiority. The total scores are totaled at the end of the stipulated six-minute period, and the wrestler with the maximum points wins. In case of a tie, the wrestler who has scored the last point is declared the winner. A competitor might also be declared a winner if the opponent does not turn up or is medically unfit to compete.

== Qualification ==
Sixteen quota places were available with each nation restricted to a maximum of one spot. Five quota places were awarded at the 2023 World Wrestling Championships, which took place from the 16th to 24th of September in Belgrade, Serbia. The finalists of each category in the four continental qualification tournaments (Asia, Europe, the Americas, and the joint Africa & Oceania) were awarded quota places. The remainder of the total quota was allocated at the 2024 World Wrestling Olympic Qualification Tournament, offering a minimum of three quota places.

== Schedule ==
All times are Central European Time (UTC+02:00)

Date	Time	Event
9 August 2024	11:30	Qualification rounds
9 August 2024	18:15	Semifinals
10 August 2024	11:00	Repechage
10 August 2024	19:30	Finals

== Results ==
Sixteen athletes qualified for the competition.

Legend

- F — Won by fall

=== Main bracket ===
Round of 16
Amir Hossein Zare (IRI)	5
Aiaal Lazarev (KGZ)	0
Amar Dhesi (CAN)	2
Deng Zhiwei (CHN)	1
Dániel Ligeti (HUN)	11
Ashton Mutuwa (NGR)	0
Jonovan Smith (PUR)	0
Taha Akgül (TUR)	10
Mason Parris (USA)	5
Mönkhtöriin Lkhagvagerel (MGL)	10
Diaaeldin Kamal (EGY)	0
Giorgi Meshvildishvili (AZE)	4
Robert Baran (POL)	4
Yusup Batirmurzaev (KAZ)	1
Oleksandr Khotsianivskyi (UKR)	0
Geno Petriashvili (GEO)	11

Quarterfinals
Amir Hossein Zare (IRI)	10
Amar Dhesi (CAN)	0
Dániel Ligeti (HUN)	0
Taha Akgül (TUR)	8
Mönkhtöriin Lkhagvagerel (MGL)	2
Giorgi Meshvildishvili (AZE)	12
Robert Baran (POL)	2
Geno Petriashvili (GEO)	9

Semifinals
Amir Hossein Zare (IRI)	2
Taha Akgül (TUR)	1
Giorgi Meshvildishvili (AZE)	0
Geno Petriashvili (GEO)	7

Final
Amir Hossein Zare (IRI)	9
Geno Petriashvili (GEO)	10

=== Repechage ===
Repechage
Aiaal Lazarev (KGZ)	5^{F}
Amar Dhesi (CAN)	0
Oleksandr Khotsianivskyi (UKR)	0
Robert Baran (POL)	3

Bronze medal matches
Aiaal Lazarev (KGZ)	0
Taha Akgül (TUR)	7
Robert Baran (POL)	3
Giorgi Meshvildishvili (AZE)	9

== Final standing ==
Rank	Athlete
1st place, gold medalist(s)	Geno Petriashvili (GEO)
2nd place, silver medalist(s)	Amir Hossein Zare (IRI)
3rd place, bronze medalist(s)	Taha Akgül (TUR)
3rd place, bronze medalist(s)	Giorgi Meshvildishvili (AZE)
5	Aiaal Lazarev (KGZ)
5	Robert Baran (POL)
7	Dániel Ligeti (HUN)
8	Mönkhtöriin Lkhagvagerel (MGL)
9	Amar Dhesi (CAN)
10	Mason Parris (USA)
11	Deng Zhiwei (CHN)
12	Yusup Batirmurzaev (KAZ)
13	Diaaeldin Kamal (EGY)
14	Jonovan Smith (PUR)
15	Ashton Mutuwa (NGR)
16	Oleksandr Khotsianivskyi (UKR)
