= Wrestling at the 2019 Pan American Games – Men's freestyle 125 kg =

Men's Freestyle 125 kg at the 2019 Pan American Games
- Venue: Miguel Grau Coliseum
- Dates: August 10
- Competitors: 8 from 8 nations

Medalists
Gold medal	Nick Gwiazdowski	United States
Silver medal	Óscar Pino	Cuba
Bronze medal	Luis Vivenes	Venezuela
Bronze medal	Korey Jarvis	Canada

The men's freestyle 125 kg competition of the Wrestling events at the 2019 Pan American Games in Lima was held on August 10 at the Miguel Grau Coliseum.

== Results ==
All times are local (UTC−5)

Legend

- F — Won by fall

=== Final ===
Quarterfinals		Semifinals		Finals
Luis Vivenes (VEN)	2
Óscar Pino (CUB)	6^{F}	Óscar Pino (CUB)	10
Antoine Jaoude (BRA)	5	Antoine Jaoude (BRA)	0
Víctor Mancheno (ECU)	5			Óscar Pino (CUB)	0
Marcos Santos (PUR)	0			Nick Gwiazdowski (USA)	10
Korey Jarvis (CAN)	11	Korey Jarvis (CAN)	0
Nick Gwiazdowski (USA)	10	Nick Gwiazdowski (USA)	10
Andrew Gunning (PER)	0

=== Repechage ===
Bronze medal match
Luis Vivenes (VEN)	11
Antoine Jaoude (BRA)	0
Andrew Gunning (PER)	0
Korey Jarvis (CAN)	7
