= 2011 European Juniors Wrestling Championships =

Wrestling competition in Serbia

- Host city: Serbia, Zrenjanin
- Dates: 21–26 June 2011

Champions
- Greco-Roman: Turkey
- Women: Russia

The 2011 European Juniors Wrestling Championships was held in Zrenjanin, Serbia 21–26 June 2011.

== Medal table ==
* Host nation (Serbia)

Rank	Nation	Gold	Silver	Bronze	Total
1	Russia	10	3	4	17
2	Azerbaijan	3	5	4	12
3	Georgia	2	3	5	10
4	Turkey	2	2	6	10
5	Ukraine	2	1	5	8
6	Belarus	1	2	4	7
7	Moldova	1	1	1	3
8	Hungary	1	0	2	3
9	Finland	1	0	0	1
9	Greece	1	0	0	1
11	France	0	3	0	3
12	Germany	0	2	5	7
13	Armenia	0	2	3	5
14	Bulgaria	0	0	3	3
15	Poland	0	0	2	2
16	Estonia	0	0	1	1
16	Romania	0	0	1	1
16	Serbia*	0	0	1	1
16	Sweden	0	0	1	1
Totals (19 entries)		24	24	48	96

== Team ranking ==
Rank	Men's freestyle		Men's Greco-Roman		Women's freestyle	
Rank	Team	Points	Team	Points	Team	Points
1			Turkey	58	Ukraine	47
2			Russia	54	Germany	38
3			Georgia	50	Russia	38
4			Azerbaijan	42	Turkey	38
5			Hungary	35	Poland	37

== Medal summary ==
=== Men's freestyle ===
Event	Gold	Silver	Bronze
50 kg	(Russia) Aldar Balshininmaev	(Moldova) Gheorghi Costin	(Germany) Marc Luithle
50 kg	(Russia) Aldar Balshininmaev	(Moldova) Gheorghi Costin	(Azerbaijan) Mirjalal Hasanzadeh
55 kg	(Georgia (country)) Vladimer Khinchegashvili	(Russia) Arsen Kuramagomedov	(Azerbaijan) Garib Aliev
55 kg	(Georgia (country)) Vladimer Khinchegashvili	(Russia) Arsen Kuramagomedov	(Armenia) Matevos Saroyan
60 kg	(Turkey) Ömer Uzan	(Azerbaijan) Haji Aliyev	(Georgia (country)) Tengiz Chochisvili
60 kg	(Turkey) Ömer Uzan	(Azerbaijan) Haji Aliyev	(Poland) Rafał Statkiewicz
66 kg	(Russia) Maymirza Khadisov	(Azerbaijan) Magomed Muslimov	(Turkey) Mustafa Kaya
66 kg	(Russia) Maymirza Khadisov	(Azerbaijan) Magomed Muslimov	(Armenia) Grigor Grigoryan
74 kg	(Turkey) Abdulkadir Özmen	(Georgia (country)) Beka Petriashvili	(Russia) Shamil Katinovasov
74 kg	(Turkey) Abdulkadir Özmen	(Georgia (country)) Beka Petriashvili	(Ukraine) Vitaly Zhukov
84 kg	(Georgia (country)) Dato Marsagishvili	(Armenia) Vahe Tamrazyan	(Poland) Zbigniew Baranowski
84 kg	(Georgia (country)) Dato Marsagishvili	(Armenia) Vahe Tamrazyan	(Russia) Albert Tsipinov
96 kg	(Azerbaijan) Aslanbek Alborov	(Russia) Batradz Gazzaev	(Georgia (country)) Tedore Ebanoidze
96 kg	(Azerbaijan) Aslanbek Alborov	(Russia) Batradz Gazzaev	(Ukraine) Hleb Kutei
120 kg	(Belarus) Igor Dziatko	(Azerbaijan) Aslan Dzebishov	(Georgia (country)) Geno Petriashvili
120 kg	(Belarus) Igor Dziatko	(Azerbaijan) Aslan Dzebishov	(Ukraine) Vyacheslav Muzaev

=== Men's Greco-Roman ===
Event	Gold	Silver	Bronze
50 kg	(Azerbaijan) Vilayat Gahramanli	(Georgia (country)) Nika Tsetskhladze	(Germany) Menekşe Deniz
50 kg	(Azerbaijan) Vilayat Gahramanli	(Georgia (country)) Nika Tsetskhladze	(Turkey) Tolgahan Karataş
55 kg	(Azerbaijan) Eldaniz Azizli	(Belarus) Andrei Pikuza	(Armenia) Narek Khachatryan
55 kg	(Azerbaijan) Eldaniz Azizli	(Belarus) Andrei Pikuza	(Bulgaria) Nikolay Vichev
60 kg	(Russia) Asker Orshokdugov	(Azerbaijan) Rovshan Tagiyev	(Hungary) Máté Krasznai
60 kg	(Russia) Asker Orshokdugov	(Azerbaijan) Rovshan Tagiyev	(Turkey) Emre Aslan
66 kg	(Russia) Magomed Chukhalov	(Georgia (country)) Sachino Davitaia	(Azerbaijan) Rasul Chunayev
66 kg	(Russia) Magomed Chukhalov	(Georgia (country)) Sachino Davitaia	(Turkey) Doğan Göktaş
74 kg	(Russia) Islam Charaev	(Turkey) İsmail Koçaslan	(Belarus) Kazbek Kilou
74 kg	(Russia) Islam Charaev	(Turkey) İsmail Koçaslan	(Georgia (country)) Zurabi Datunashvili
84 kg	(Ukraine) Zhan Beleniuk	(Germany) Ramsin Azizsir	(Russia) Movsar Duguchiev
84 kg	(Ukraine) Zhan Beleniuk	(Germany) Ramsin Azizsir	(Turkey) Aslan Atem
96 kg	(Hungary) György Rizmajer	(Armenia) Artur Aleksanyan	(Turkey) Metehan Başar
96 kg	(Hungary) György Rizmajer	(Armenia) Artur Aleksanyan	(Georgia (country)) Sandro Dikhaminjia
120 kg	(Russia) Vasily Parshin	(Turkey) Bayram Nigar	(Ukraine) Igor Didyk
120 kg	(Russia) Vasily Parshin	(Turkey) Bayram Nigar	(Hungary) Bálint Lám

=== Women's freestyle ===
Event	Gold	Silver	Bronze
44 kg	(Russia) Nadezda Fedorova	(Ukraine) Gana Bogunenko	(Sweden) Josefine Fredriksen
44 kg	(Russia) Nadezda Fedorova	(Ukraine) Gana Bogunenko	(Azerbaijan) Marziget Bagomedova
48 kg	(Russia) Tatyana Samkova	(Germany) Nina Hemmer	(Belarus) Vanesa Kaladzinskaya
48 kg	(Russia) Tatyana Samkova	(Germany) Nina Hemmer	(Romania) Emilia Alina Vuc
51 kg	(Finland) Petra Olli	(Azerbaijan) Patimat Bagomedova	(Moldova) Elena Turcan
51 kg	(Finland) Petra Olli	(Azerbaijan) Patimat Bagomedova	(Germany) Katrin Henke
55 kg	(Greece) Maria Prevolaraki	(France) Tatiana Debien	(Germany) Eileen Friedrich
55 kg	(Greece) Maria Prevolaraki	(France) Tatiana Debien	(Belarus) Zalina Sidakova
59 kg	(Moldova) Mariana Cherdivara	(France) Adeline Vescan	(Russia) Svetlana Lipatova
59 kg	(Moldova) Mariana Cherdivara	(France) Adeline Vescan	(Bulgaria) Dzhanan Ahmed
63 kg	(Russia) Iuliia Alborova	(Belarus) Anastasiya Huchok	(Bulgaria) Taybe Yusein
63 kg	(Russia) Iuliia Alborova	(Belarus) Anastasiya Huchok	(Ukraine) Tetyana Lavrenchuk
67 kg	(Ukraine) Alina Makhynyua	(Russia) Oksana Nagornykh	(Belarus) Halina Levchanka
67 kg	(Ukraine) Alina Makhynyua	(Russia) Oksana Nagornykh	(Germany) Maria Selmaier
72 kg	(Russia) Natalia Vorobieva	(France) Cynthia Vescan	(Serbia) Una Svetlana Tuba
72 kg	(Russia) Natalia Vorobieva	(France) Cynthia Vescan	(Estonia) Epp Mäe
