= 2019 Yasar Dogu Tournament =

Yasar Dogu 2019
- Host city: Istanbul, Turkey
- Dates: 11–14 July
- Stadium: Bagcılar Olympic Sports Hall

Champions
- Freestyle: Turkey
- Women: Russia

The 47th Yasar Dogu Tournament 2019, was a wrestling event held in Istanbul, Turkey between 11 and 14 July 2019.

This international tournament included competitions in men's and women's freestyle wrestling. It was held as the sixth of the ranking series of United World Wrestling in 2019. This ranking tournament was held in honor of two-time Olympic Champion, Yaşar Doğu.

The Bağcılar Olympic Sports Hall hosted about 300 freestyle wrestlers from 35 countries, competing for the top title in the 47th Yaşar Doğu International Wrestling Tournament.

== Medal table ==
Rank	Nation	Gold	Silver	Bronze	Total
1	United States	6	1	0	7
2	India	4	1	3	8
3	Turkey	3	2	10	15
4	Belarus	1	2	1	4
5	Canada	1	1	1	3
5	Italy	1	1	1	3
7	Azerbaijan	1	0	2	3
7	Sweden	1	0	2	3
9	Nigeria	1	0	1	2
10	Bulgaria	1	0	0	1
11	Russia	0	3	5	8
12	Hungary	0	2	3	5
13	Kazakhstan	0	2	2	4
14	Iran	0	1	1	2
14	Slovakia	0	1	1	2
16	Bahrain	0	1	0	1
16	Brazil	0	1	0	1
16	Ukraine	0	1	0	1
19	Germany	0	0	4	4
20	Algeria	0	0	1	1
20	Norway	0	0	1	1
20	Uzbekistan	0	0	1	1
Totals (22 entries)		20	20	40	80

=== Team ranking ===
Rank	Men's freestyle		Women's freestyle	
Rank	Team	Points	Team	Points
1	Turkey	165	Russia	113
2	United States	157	Turkey	112
3	India	99	Belarus	92
4	Hungary	83	India	89
5	Azerbaijan	81	Canada	78

== Medal overview ==
=== Men's freestyle ===
Event	Gold	Silver	Bronze
57 kg	(Italy) Givi Davidovi	(Turkey) Barış Kaya	(Algeria) Abdelhak Kherbache
57 kg	(Italy) Givi Davidovi	(Turkey) Barış Kaya	(Azerbaijan) Giorgi Edisherashvili
61 kg	(India) Rahul Aware	(Turkey) Münir Recep Aktaş	(India) Utkarsh Kale
61 kg	(India) Rahul Aware	(Turkey) Münir Recep Aktaş	(Turkey) Emrah Ormanoğlu
65 kg	(United States) Yianni Diakomihalis	(Bahrain) Haji Mohamad Ali	(Turkey) Cengizhan Erdoğan
65 kg	(United States) Yianni Diakomihalis	(Bahrain) Haji Mohamad Ali	(Hungary) Ismail Musukaev
70 kg	(Bulgaria) Mihail Iliev Georgiev	(Kazakhstan) Ilyas Zhumay	(Turkey) Haydar Yavuz
70 kg	(Bulgaria) Mihail Iliev Georgiev	(Kazakhstan) Ilyas Zhumay	(India) Rajnesh Rajneesh
74 kg	(United States) Jordan Burroughs	(Italy) Frank Chamizo	(Turkey) Fazlı Eryılmaz
74 kg	(United States) Jordan Burroughs	(Italy) Frank Chamizo	(Slovakia) Tajmuraz Salkazanov
79 kg	(United States) Alex Dieringer	(Slovakia) Akhsarbek Gulaev	(Turkey) Muhammet Nuri Kotanoğlu
79 kg	(United States) Alex Dieringer	(Slovakia) Akhsarbek Gulaev	(Iran) Bahman Teymouri
86 kg	(Azerbaijan) Aleksandr Gostiyev	(India) Deepak Punia	(Turkey) Selim Yaşar
86 kg	(Azerbaijan) Aleksandr Gostiyev	(India) Deepak Punia	(Turkey) Osman Göçen
92 kg	(United States) J'den Cox	(Hungary) Bendegúz Tóth	(Turkey) Süleyman Karadeniz
92 kg	(United States) J'den Cox	(Hungary) Bendegúz Tóth	(Azerbaijan) Shamil Zubairov
97 kg	(United States) Kyle Snyder	(Iran) Ali Shabani	(Hungary) Pavlo Oliynyk
97 kg	(United States) Kyle Snyder	(Iran) Ali Shabani	(Italy) Abraham Conyedo
125 kg	(Turkey) Taha Akgül	(United States) Nick Gwiazdowski	(Hungary) Dániel Ligeti
125 kg	(Turkey) Taha Akgül	(United States) Nick Gwiazdowski	(India) Sumit Malik

=== Women's freestyle ===
Event	Gold	Silver	Bronze
50 kg	(India) Seema Seema	(Russia) Valeriya Chepsarakova	(Russia) Nadezhda Sokolova
50 kg	(India) Seema Seema	(Russia) Valeriya Chepsarakova	(Turkey) Evin Demirhan
53 kg	(India) Vinesh Phogat	(Russia) Ekaterina Poleshchuk	(Germany) Nina Hemmer
53 kg	(India) Vinesh Phogat	(Russia) Ekaterina Poleshchuk	(Germany) Annika Wendle
55 kg	(Turkey) Bediha Gün	(Kazakhstan) Zulfiya Yakhyarova	(Kazakhstan) Marina Sedneva
55 kg	(Turkey) Bediha Gün	(Kazakhstan) Zulfiya Yakhyarova	(Canada) Samantha Stewart
57 kg	(Nigeria) Odunayo Adekuoroye	(Ukraine) Tetyana Kit	(Germany) Sandra Paruszewski
57 kg	(Nigeria) Odunayo Adekuoroye	(Ukraine) Tetyana Kit	(Russia) Olga Khoroshavtseva
59 kg	(India) Manju Kumari	(Belarus) Katsiaryna Hanchar-Yanushkevich	(Sweden) Emma Johansson
59 kg	(India) Manju Kumari	(Belarus) Katsiaryna Hanchar-Yanushkevich	(Sweden) Johanna Lindborg
62 kg	(Sweden) Henna Johansson	(Hungary) Marianna Sastin	(Belarus) Veranika Ivanova
62 kg	(Sweden) Henna Johansson	(Hungary) Marianna Sastin	(Russia) Uliana Tukurenova
65 kg	(United States) Forrest Molinari	(Russia) Natalia Fedoseeva	(Kazakhstan) Aina Temirtassova
65 kg	(United States) Forrest Molinari	(Russia) Natalia Fedoseeva	(Russia) Anna Shcherbakova
68 kg	(Belarus) Maria Mamashuk	(Canada) Danielle Lappage	(Germany) Anna Schell
68 kg	(Belarus) Maria Mamashuk	(Canada) Danielle Lappage	(Nigeria) Blessing Oborududu
72 kg	(Turkey) Buse Tosun	(Belarus) Anastasiya Zimiankova	(Russia) Alena Starodubtseva
72 kg	(Turkey) Buse Tosun	(Belarus) Anastasiya Zimiankova	(Uzbekistan) Nilufar Gadaeva
76 kg	(Canada) Erica Wiebe	(Brazil) Aline Ferreira	(Turkey) Yasemin Adar
76 kg	(Canada) Erica Wiebe	(Brazil) Aline Ferreira	(Norway) Iselin Moen Solheim

== Participating nations ==
240 competitors from 29 nations participated.

- United States (10)
- Austria (1)
- Azerbaijan (10)
- Belarus (7)
- Brazil (5)
- Bahrain (1)
- Bulgaria (5)
- Algeria (6)
- Ecuador (2)
- Germany (11)
- India (17)
- Iran (5)
- Italy (3)
- Canada (6)
- Kazakhstan (19)
- Kyrgyzstan (5)
- North Macedonia (5)
- Hungary (12)
- Nigeria (2)
- Norway (2)
- Uzbekistan (8)
- Romania (3)
- Russia (14)
- Slovakia (3)
- Sweden (6)
- Tajikistan (1)
- Tunisia (8)
- Turkey (56)
- Ukraine (7)

== Ranking Series ==
Ranking Series Calendar 2019:

- 1st Ranking Series: 24–28 January, Russia, Krasnoyarsk ⇒ Golden Grand Prix Ivan Yarygin 2019 (FS, WW)
- 2nd Ranking Series: 9-10 February, Croatia, Zagreb ⇒ 2019 Grand Prix Zagreb Open (GR)
- 3rd Ranking Series: 23-24 February, Hungary, Győr ⇒ Hungarian Grand Prix - Polyák Imre Memorial (GR)
- 4th Ranking Series: 28 February-03 March, Bulgaria, Ruse ⇒ 2019 Dan Kolov & Nikola Petrov Tournament (FS, WW, GR)
- 5th Ranking Series: 23-25 May, Italy, Sassari ⇒ Matteo Pellicone Ranking Series 2019 (FS, WW, GR)
- 6th Ranking Series: 11–14 July, Turkey, Istanbul ⇒ 2019 Yasar Dogu Tournament (FS, WW)
- 7th Ranking Series: 28 February-03 March, Belarus, Minsk ⇒ 2019 Oleg Karavaev Tournament (GR)
