= Wrestling at the 2018 Commonwealth Games – Men's freestyle 125 kg =

Wrestling – Men's freestyle 125 kg at the 2018 Commonwealth Games
- Venue: Carrara Sports and Leisure Centre
- Dates: 14 April 2018
- Competitors: 5 from 5 nations

Medalists
gold medal	Sumit Malik	India
silver medal	Korey Jarvis	Canada
bronze medal	Tayab Raza	Pakistan

The men's 125 kg freestyle wrestling competition at the 2018 Commonwealth Games in Gold Coast, Australia was held on 14 April at the Carrara Sports and Leisure Centre.

== Results ==
As there were less than 6 competitors entered in this event, the competition was contested as a Nordic round with each athlete playing every other athlete. The medallists were determined by the standings after the completion of the Nordic round.

Legend

- F — Won by fall
- R — Retired
- WO — Won by walkover

=== Nordic group ===
Pos	Athlete	Pld	W	L	CP	TP
1	Sumit Malik (IND)	4	4	0	16	16
2	Korey Jarvis (CAN)	4	3	1	15	23
3	Tayab Raza (PAK)	4	2	2	11	14
4	Sinivie Boltic (NGR)	4	0	4	0	2
5	Claude Kouamen (CMR)	4	0	4	0	0

Source: UWW

	Score		CP
Claude Kouamen (CMR)	0–10	Korey Jarvis (CAN)	0–4 VSU
Sinivie Boltic (NGR)	2–10 Ret	Tayab Raza (PAK)	0–5 VIN
Sumit Malik (IND)	WO	Claude Kouamen (CMR)	5–0 VIN
Korey Jarvis (CAN)	WO	Sinivie Boltic (NGR)	5–0 VIN
Tayab Raza (PAK)	WO	Claude Kouamen (CMR)	5–0 VIN
Sumit Malik (IND)	6–4	Korey Jarvis (CAN)	3–1 VPO1
Sinivie Boltic (NGR)		Claude Kouamen (CMR)	0–0 2VIN
Tayab Raza (PAK)	4–10	Sumit Malik (IND)	1–3 VPO1
Korey Jarvis (CAN)	9–0 Fall	Tayab Raza (PAK)	5–0 VFA
Sinivie Boltic (NGR)	WO	Sumit Malik (IND)	0–5 VIN
