= Ioannis Arzoumanidis =

Greek wrestler and mixed martial arts fighter

- Born: Γιάννης Αρζουμανίδης; October 22, 1986 (age 39); Thessaloniki, Greece
- Other names: Arzoo
- Height: 6 ft 0 in (1.83 m)
- Weight: 265 lb (120 kg; 18 st 13 lb)
- Division: Heavyweight
- Fighting out of: Thessaloniki, Greece
- Years active: 2012–present

Mixed martial arts record
- Total: 8
- Wins: 7
- By knockout: 5
- By submission: 1
- By decision: 1
- Losses: 1
- By knockout: 1

Other information
- Mixed martial arts record from Sherdog

Ioannis Arzoumanidis
Medal record

Men's Freestyle wrestling

Representing Greece

World Championships
Bronze medal – third place	2009 Herning	120 kg
Bronze medal – third place	2010 Moscow	120 kg

Mediterranean Games
Silver medal – second place	2009 Pescara	120 kg

Ioannis Arzoumanidis (Greek: Γιάννης Αρζουμανίδης; born October 22, 1986) is a freestyle wrestler from Greece.

== Championships and accomplishments ==
=== MMA ===
- MMA Challenge Pro
  - MMA Challenge Pro Heavyweight Champion (2 Title Defences)

== Mixed martial arts record ==
Professional record breakdown
8 matches	7 wins	1 loss
By knockout	5	1
By submission	1	0
By decision	1	0

Res.	Record	Opponent	Method	Event	Date	Round	Time	Location	Notes
Win	7–1	Mehmet Ozer	TKO (punches)	MCP 10	February 22, 2020	1	2:06	Thessaloniki, Greece	
Loss	6–1	Denis Smoldarev	TKO (punches)	ACA 97: Goncharov vs. Johnson 2	August 31, 2019	1	3:35	Krasnodar, Russia	
Win	6–0	Amirkhan Isagadzhiev	TKO (punches)	ACA 94: Bagov vs. Khaliev	March 30, 2019	2	2:21	Krasnodar, Russia	
Win	5–0	Mehmet Ozer	TKO (Punches)	GFC 8 - Greek Fighting Championship 8	May 13, 2017	1	1:32	Thessaloniki, Greece	
Win	4–0	Archontis Taxiarchis	TKO (Punches)	MMA Challenge Pro 4	September 25, 2015	1	2:32	Thessaloniki, Greece	Defended MMA Challenge Pro Heavyweight Championship.
Win	3–0	Nestoras Batzelas	Decision (unanimous)	MMA Challenge Pro 2	September 13, 2014	3	5:00	Thessaloniki, Greece	Defended MMA Challenge Pro Heavyweight Championship.
Win	2–0	Victor Svetlinskin	Submission (guillotine choke)	MMA Challenge Pro	September 14, 2013	2	1:40	Thessaloniki, Greece	Won MMA Challenge Pro Heavyweight Championship.
Win	1–0	Themis Andreev	TKO (punches)	Night of the Champions	July 31, 2012	1	1:20	Faliraki, Greece	

== See also ==
- List of current ACA fighters
- List of male mixed martial artists
