= Sumit Malik =

Indian freestyle wrestler

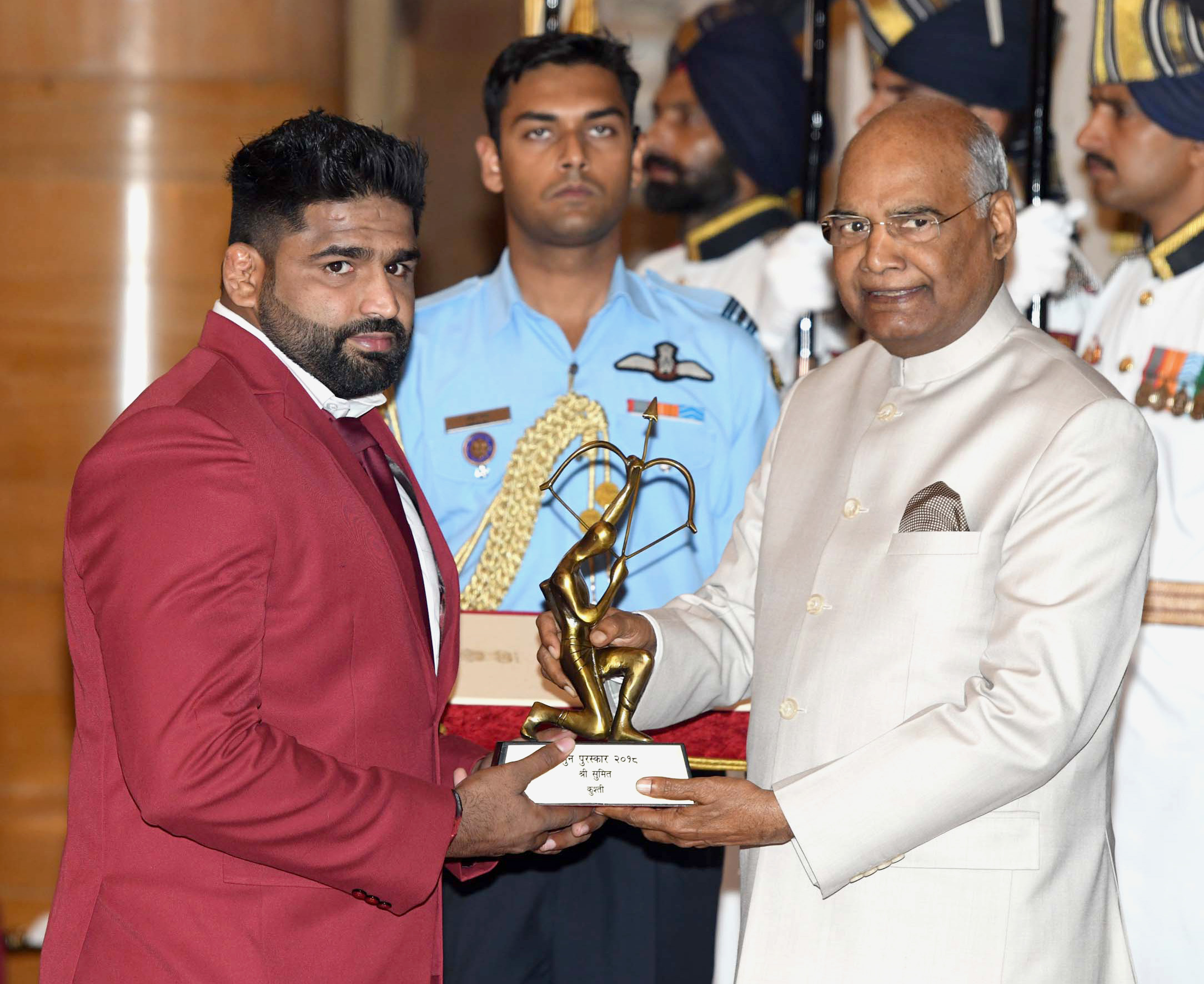
- Malik (left) receiving the Arjuna Award in 2018

Personal information
- Nationality: Indian
- Born: 9 January 1993 (age 33) Karor village, Rohtak district, Haryana, India

Sport
- Country: India
- Sport: Wrestling
- Event: Freestyle wrestling
Medal record
Men's Freestyle wrestling
Representing India
Commonwealth Games
Gold medal – first place	2018 Gold Coast	125 kg
Asian Championships
Silver medal – second place	2017 New Delhi	125 kg
Bronze medal – third place	2019 Xi'an	125 kg
Yasar Dogu Tournament
Bronze medal – third place	2019 Istanbul	125 kg
Commonwealth Championships
Silver medal – second place	2017 Johannesburg	125 kg
- Updated on 14 April 2018

Sumit Malik (born 9 January 1993) is a freestyle wrestler from India who competes in 125 kg category. He was gold medallist at the 2018 Commonwealth Games. He has also been silver medalist at both the Asian Wrestling Championships and the Commonwealth Wrestling Championship in 2017.

In July 2021, Malik was handed a two-year ban by United World Wrestling for failing a dope test.

== Early life and career ==
Malik was born on 9 January 1993 in Karor village of Haryana's Rohtak district. His mother died when he was young, after which his maternal grandparents took him to his maternal home in Delhi. There his maternal uncle was a wrestler in Chhatrasal Stadium, from whom he got inspiration to become wrestler. He has been training at Chhatrasal Stadium since the age of 13.

Malik's first bout at the 2017 Asian Wrestling Championships was in quarterfinals where he defeated Japan's Taiki Yamamoto by 6–3. After winning his next bout against Tajikistan's Farkhod Anakulov by 7–2, he lost in the final to Iran's Yadollah Mohebbi by 6–2. Later in the year, he participated in the 2017 World Wrestling Championships, where he lost in the opening bout to Russia's Anzor Khizriev. As Khizriev did not become finalist, Malik did not get another chance to make comeback via repechage. In November, he won 2017 National wrestling championships after defeating Hitender in the final. Whereas he lost to Hitender in the final of the 2017 Commonwealth Wrestling Championships in the next month.

At the 2018 Commonwealth Games, Malik won his opening bout of Nordic format after injured Claude Kouamen Mbianga forfeited it. After the closely fought victory against Canada's Korey Jarvis in the second bout by a margin of 6–4, Malik registered comfortable win against Pakistan's Tayab Raza with a score of 10–4. In the last bout, Malik received second walkover of the match when injured Sinivie Boltic forfeited it, thereby winning the title.
