= Mönkhtöriin Lkhagvagerel =

Mongolian wrestler (born 1998)

Personal information
- Native name: Мөнхтөрийн Лхагвагэрэл
- Nationality: Mongolia
- Born: 4 January 1998 (age 28) Ulaanbaatar, Mongolia
- Height: 187 cm (6 ft 2 in)

Sport
- Country: Mongolia
- Sport: Amateur wrestling
- Weight class: 125 kg
- Event: Freestyle

Achievements and titles
- Olympic finals: 5th (2020)
- World finals: (silver) (2022) (bronze) (2021)
- Regional finals: (gold) (2023)
Medal record
Men's freestyle wrestling
Representing Mongolia
World Championships
Silver medal – second place	2022 Belgrade	125 kg
Bronze medal – third place	2021 Oslo	125 kg
Asian Championships
Gold medal – first place	2023 Astana	125 kg
Silver medal – second place	2025 Amman	125 kg
Asian Games
Silver medal – second place	2022 Hangzhou	125 kg
Olympic Qualification Tournament
Silver medal – second place	2021 Almaty	125 kg
Yasar Dogu Tournament
Silver medal – second place	2022 Istanbul	125 kg
Silver medal – second place	2024 Antalya	125 kg
Grand Prix
Gold medal – first place	2025 Ulaanbaatar	125 kg
Silver medal – second place	2021 Moscow	125 kg
Bronze medal – third place	2017 Ulaanbaatar	125 kg
Bronze medal – third place	2017 Yakutsk	125 kg
Bronze medal – third place	2018 Tabriz	125 kg
Bronze medal – third place	2018 Ulaanbaatar	125 kg
Bronze medal – third place	2019 Ulan-Ude	125 kg
Bronze medal – third place	2022 Almaty	125 kg
Poddubny wrestling league
Silver medal – second place	2022 Moscow	125 kg
Silver medal – second place	2022 Bishkek	125 kg
World U23 Championships
Bronze medal – third place	2019 Budapest	125 kg
Asian U23 Championships
Silver medal – second place	2019 Ulaanbaatar	125 kg
Asian Juniors Championships
Silver medal – second place	2017 Taichung	120 kg

Mönkhtöriin Lkhagvagerel (Mongolian: Мөнхтөрийн Лхагвагэрэл; born 4 January 1998), also known as Lkhagvagerel Munkhtur, is a Mongolian wrestler. He won the silver medal in the men's 125 kg event at the 2022 World Wrestling Championships held in Belgrade, Serbia, where Lkhagvagerel beat Olympic Champion Geno Petriashvili 4–2. His father Munkhtur was a wrestler in Mongolia. He competed in the 2020 Summer Olympics.

In 2022, he won the silver medal in his event at the Yasar Dogu Tournament held in Istanbul, Turkey. At the 2022 World Cup he earned the 5th place in the 125 kg event, with wins over current U.S. Open Champion Hayden Zillmer, current U23 European Champion Solomon Manashvili, and leaving the tournament undefeated in the individual standings. He won the gold medal in his event at the 2023 Asian Wrestling Championships held in Astana, Kazakhstan.

He competed at the 2024 Asian Wrestling Olympic Qualification Tournament in Bishkek, Kyrgyzstan and he earned a quota place for Mongolia for the 2024 Summer Olympics in Paris, France. He competed in the men's freestyle 125 kg event at the Olympics.

In Mongolian Bökh wrestling, he won the 2026 Сhinggis Khan Cup by defeating the reigning national champion, Orkhonbayar Bayarsaikhan.
