= Parviz Hadi =

Iranian wrestler (born 1987)

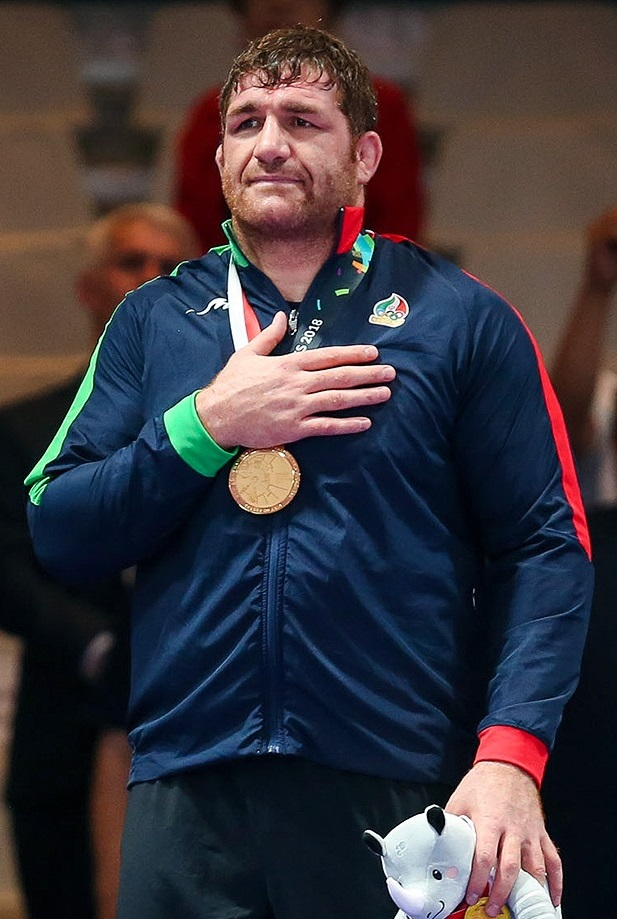

Personal information
- Native name: پرویز هادی باسمنج
- Full name: Parviz Hadi Basmanj
- Nationality: Iran
- Born: November 16, 1987 (age 38) Basmenj, Tabriz, Iran
- Height: 1.91 m (6 ft 3 in)

Sport
- Country: Iran
- Sport: Wrestling
Medal record
Representing Iran
Men's freestyle wrestling
World Championships
Bronze medal – third place	2018 Budapest	125 kg
Asian Games
Gold medal – first place	2014 Incheon	125 kg
Gold medal – first place	2018 Jakarta	125 kg
Asian Championships
Gold medal – first place	2012 Gumi	120 kg
Gold medal – first place	2013 New Delhi	120 kg
Gold medal – first place	2016 Bangkok	125 kg
Bronze medal – third place	2020 New Delhi	125 kg
Dan Kolov & Nikola Petrov Tournament
Gold medal – first place	2019 Ruse	125 kg
Grand Prix
Gold medal – first place	2014 Tehran	125 kg
Gold medal – first place	2015 Kermanshah	125 kg
Gold medal – first place	2016 Tehran	125 kg
Gold medal – first place	2018 Tabriz	125 kg
Gold medal – first place	2020 Kermanshah	125 kg
Bronze medal – third place	2010 Esfahan	120 kg
Bronze medal – third place	2011 Kish	120 kg
Universiade
Bronze medal – third place	2013 Kazan	120 kg

Parviz Hadi Basmenj (Persian: پرویز هادی باسمنج; born 16 November 1987 in Basmenj, East Azerbaijan, Iran), is an Iranian wrestler. He became Pahlevan of Iran in the 2014/2015 competition.

== Major achievements ==
- World Championships – (bronze) 2018
- Asian Games – (gold) 2014, 2018
- Asian Championships – (gold) 2012, 2013, 2016
- World Cup – (gold) 2014, 2015, 2016
- Universiade – (silver) 2013
- Pahlevan of Iran – (gold) 2014/2015
