= Natsagsürengiin Zolboo =

Mongolian freestyle wrestler (born 1990)

Natsagsürengiin Zolboo ᠨᠠᠴᠠᠭᠰᠦᠷᠦᠩ ᠦᠨ ᠵᠣᠯᠪᠤᠤ
Personal information
- Native name: Нацагсүрэнгийн Золбоо
- Nationality: Mongolia
- Born: 14 December 1990 (age 35) Ulaanbaatar, Mongolia
- Education: Jurist
- Employer: National Police Agency: Police Major
- Height: 181 cm (5 ft 11 in)

Sport
- Country: Mongolia
- Sport: Wrestling
- Weight class: 125 kg
- Rank: State Hawk (Mongolian wrestling); International Master of Sports (Freestyle Wrestling)
- Event: Freestyle
- University team: Ikh Zasag University (2008–2012)
- Club: Munkhiin Useg Group; Badrah Ugluu LLC; Negdel Club; Terguun Bogd Wrestling Club; Internal Troops Unit 810

Achievements and titles
- World finals: 5th (2017)
- Regional finals: (silver) (2014)
Medal record
Men's freestyle wrestling
Representing Mongolia
Asian Championships
| Silver medal – second place | 2014 Astana | 125 kg |
| Bronze medal – third place | 2011 Tashkent | 96 kg |
| Bronze medal – third place | 2016 Bangkok | 125 kg |
| Bronze medal – third place | 2017 New Delhi | 125 kg |
| Bronze medal – third place | 2018 Bishkek | 125 kg |
Golden Grand Prix Ivan Yarygin
| Bronze medal – third place | 2017 Krasnoyarsk | 125 kg |
| Bronze medal – third place | 2018 Krasnoyarsk | 125 kg |
Dan Kolov & Nikola Petrov Tournament
| Silver medal – second place | 2013 Plovdiv | 125 kg |

Natsagsürengiin Zolboo (Mongolian: Нацагсүрэнгийн Золбоо; born 14 December 1990) is a Mongolian freestyle wrestler. He is also a Mongolian traditional wrestler who holds the rank of State Hawk.

He won a silver medal in the 125 kg category at the 2014 Asian Wrestling Championships in Astana, Kazakhstan, losing in the final to Komeil Ghasemi.

== Education ==
In 2012, he graduated from Ikh Zasag University with a bachelor's degree in Jurisprudence.

== Work ==
Since 2011, he has been affiliated with the Power and Sports Committee of the National Police Agency and holds the rank of Police Major.

== Wrestling Titles ==
- State Hawk (Mongolian wrestling)
- Danshig Zaan (Mongolian wrestling)
- Tuvan State Falcon (Khuresh wrestling)
- International Master of Sports (Freestyle wrestling)

== Mongolian Wrestling Career Record ==
Natsagsürengiin Zolboo
| Year | Level | Participants | Rank | Wins | Earned title | Notes |
|---|---|---|---|---|---|---|
| 2026 | State | 1024 | State Hawk | 4 | | |
| 2025 | State | 512 | State Hawk | 3 | | |
| 2024 | State | 512 | State Hawk | 3 | | |
| 2023 | State | 512 | State Hawk | 4 | | |
| 2022 | State | 1024 | State Hawk | 6 | Unen Zorigt | |
| 2021 | Cancelled | | State Hawk | | | The tournament cancelled due to covid. |
| 2020 | State | 512 | State Hawk | 3 | | |
| 2019 | State | 512 | State Hawk | 3 | | |
| 2018 | State | 512 | Lion of Aimag | 6 | State Hawk | |
| 2018 | | 256 | Lion of Aimag | 5 | Usukh | |
| 2017 | Aimag | 256 | Lion of Aimag | 8 | Badrangui | |
| 2016 | Aimag | 256 | Lion of Aimag | 8 | Khurts | |
| 2015 | Aimag | 256 | Lion of Aimag | 5 | Nemekh | |
| 2014 | Aimag | 256 | Elephant of Aimag | 8 | Lion of Aimag | |
| 2013 | Aimag | 256 | Elephant of Sum | 7 | Elephant of Aimag | |
State Naadam Winner Won at least 5 rounds in State Naadam Aimag/Sum Naadam Promotion
