= Zach Rey =

American wrestler (born 1989

Personal information
- Born: March 27, 1989 (age 37) Hopatcong, New Jersey, U.S.

Sport
- Country: United States
- Sport: Wrestling
- Events: Freestyle and Folkstyle
- College team: Lehigh
- Club: Lehigh Valley Wrestling Club
- Team: USA
Medal record
Men's freestyle wrestling
Representing United States
Pan American Games
Gold medal – first place	2015 Toronto	125 kg
Men's collegiate wrestling
Representing the Lehigh Mountain Hawks
NCAA Division I Championships
Gold medal – first place	2011 Philadelphia	285 lb
Silver medal – second place	2012 St. Louis	285 lb
Bronze medal – third place	2010 Omaha	285 lb

Zach Rey (born March 27, 1989) is an American former wrestler. He competed for Lehigh Valley Athletic Club and represented the United States at the 2015 World Wrestling Championships at 125 kg in freestyle wrestling.

== Early life and education ==
Rey was born in Hopatcong, New Jersey, and attended Hopatcong High School from 2003 to 2007. As a high school wrestler, he was a three-time state place winner and won two NJSIAA state titles in 2006 and 2007. In his senior year, Rey was an all-state New Jersey football player.

Rey attended Lehigh University in Bethlehem, Pennsylvania, where he was a four-time NCAA Division I qualifier and three-time place winner, finishing third in 2010, second in 2012, and winning an NCAA championship as a junior in 201. Rey finished his collegiate wrestling career at Lehigh with 120 wins and 15 losses for a winning percentage of 89%. Rey currently ranks 4th on the career win list at Lehigh.

In 2012, Rey graduated from Lehigh, earning a degree in Earth and Environmental Science.

== International ==
While in college, Rey represented the United States at the 2010 University World Championships, where he finished in 8th place with a 1-1 record. Rey has since gone on to success at the senior level, making three freestyle national teams and finishing among the top three for the World Team and Olympic trials. He won two Pan American Championships (in 2013 and 2014), the Pan American Games (in 2015), the Dave Schultz Memorial (in 2013), and the Cerro Pelado International (in 2014 and 2015).

In 2015, after losing in the finals at the World Team Trials, Rey was awarded the opportunity to compete in the 2015 World Wrestling Championships after World Team Trials winner Tervel Dlagnev was forced to miss competition due to injury. Rey competed at 125kg and went on to finish 0-1 at the championships.

== Coaching ==
In 2019, Rey was hired by his alma mater, Lehigh University, where he is an assistant coach for the Lehigh Mountain Hawks college wrestling program and is currently coaching his 9th season.
