= Deng Zhiwei =

Chinese freestyle wrestler

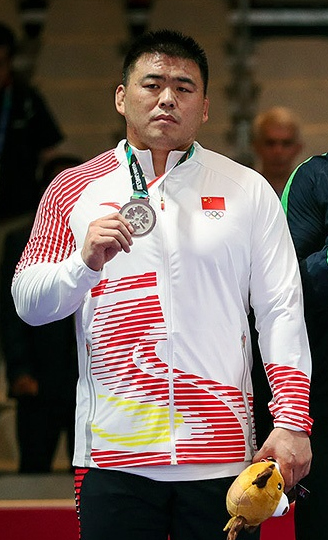
- Deng at the 2018 Asian Games

Personal information
- Born: February 1, 1988 (age 38) Hengshui, China
- Height: 188 cm (6 ft 2 in)
- Weight: 125 kg (276 lb)

Sport
- Sport: Freestyle wrestling
Medal record
Representing China
World Championships
Silver medal – second place	2018 Budapest	125 kg
Bronze medal – third place	2019 Nur-Sultan	125 kg
Asian Championships
Silver medal – second place	2019 Xi'an	125 kg
Bronze medal – third place	2011 Tashkent	125 kg
Bronze medal – third place	2015 Doha	125 kg
Asian Games
Silver medal – second place	2018 Jakarta	125 kg
World Military Games
Silver medal – second place	2015 Moungyeong	125 kg
Bronze medal – third place	2019 Wuhan	125 kg
Dan Kolov & Nikola Petrov Tournament
Gold medal – first place	2016 Sofia	125 kg
World Military Championships
Gold medal – first place	2013 Tehran	120 kg
Silver medal – second place	2017 Klaipeda	125 kg
Bronze medal – third place	2008 Split	120 kg
Bronze medal – third place	2010 Lahti	120 kg
Bronze medal – third place	2014 Fort Dix	125 kg
Golden Grand Prix
Bronze medal – third place	2015 Baku	120 kg
Grand Prix
Gold medal – first place	2019 Ulan-Ude	125 kg
Gold medal – first place	2022 Bucharest	125 kg
Silver medal – second place	2015 Madrid	125 kg
Silver medal – second place	2018 Minsk	125 kg
Bronze medal – third place	2011 London	120 kg
Bronze medal – third place	2015 Paris	125 kg
Bronze medal – third place	2015 Warsaw	125 kg
Bronze medal – third place	2016 Spala	125 kg
Bronze medal – third place	2018 Warsaw	125 kg
Bronze medal – third place	2019 Kaspiysk	125 kg
Bronze medal – third place	2023 Bishkek	125 kg
Bronze medal – third place	2023 Budapest	125 kg
Bronze medal – third place	2024 Zagreb	125 kg
Bronze medal – third place	2024 Krasnoyarsk	125 kg
National Games of China
Gold medal – first place	2017 Tianjin	125 kg
Gold medal – first place	2021 Shaanxi	125 kg
Gold medal – first place	2025 Guangdong	125 kg
World Juniors Championships
Bronze medal – third place	2007 Beijing	120 kg

Deng Zhiwei (Chinese: 邓志伟, born February 1, 1988) is a Chinese heavyweight freestyle wrestler who won a silver medal at the 2018 World Wrestling Championships and a bronze medal at the 2019 World Wrestling Championships.

== Career ==
Deng competed at the 2016 Olympics, and was eliminated in the round of 16 by Levan Berianidze.

Deng returned to the 2020 Olympics, where he achieved greater success. He came 5th place after losing the Bronze Medal match to Amir Hossein Zare.

He competed in the 125 kg event at the 2022 World Wrestling Championships held in Belgrade, Serbia.

Deng earned a quota place for China for the 2024 Summer Olympics at the 2024 World Wrestling Olympic Qualification Tournament held in Istanbul, Turkey. He competed in the men's 125 kg event at the Olympics.

== Major results ==
Year	Tournament	Location	Result	Event
2021	Olympic Games	Tokyo, Japan	5th	Freestyle 125 kg
2019	World Championships	Nur-Sultan, Kazakhstan	3rd	Freestyle 125 kg
2019	Asian Championships	Xi'an, China	2nd	Freestyle 125 kg
2018	World Championships	Budapest, Hungary	2nd	Freestyle 125 kg
2018	Asian Games	Jakarta, Indonesia	2nd	Freestyle 125 kg
2016	Olympic Games	Rio de Janeiro, Brazil	13th	Freestyle 125 kg
2015	World Championships	Las Vegas, United States	18th	Freestyle 125 kg
2015	Asian Championships	Doha, Qatar	3rd	Freestyle 125 kg
2014	World Championships	Tashkent, Uzbekistan	10th	Freestyle 125 kg
