= Luis Vivenes =

Venezuelan freestyle wrestler

Luis Vivénes
Personal information
- Full name: Luis Felipe Vivénes Urbanesa
- Nationality: Venezuela
- Born: 6 October 1980 (age 45) Cumaná, Sucre, Venezuela
- Height: 1.85 m (6 ft 1 in)
- Weight: 96 kg (212 lb)

Sport
- Sport: Wrestling
- Event: Freestyle
- Club: Munisipalito Cumaná
- Coached by: Edy Azuaje
Medal record
Men's freestyle wrestling
Representing Venezuela
Pan American Games
Silver medal – second place	2007 Rio de Janeiro	96 kg
Silver medal – second place	2011 Guadalajara	96 kg
Bronze medal – third place	2019 Lima	125 kg
Central American and Caribbean Games
Gold medal – first place	2010 Mayagüez	96 kg
Bronze medal – third place	2006 Cartagena	96 kg

Luis Felipe Vivénes Urbanesa (born October 6, 1980 in Cumaná, Sucre) is an amateur Venezuelan freestyle wrestler, who played for the men's heavyweight category.

== Career ==
He won two medals each for his division at the Pan American Games (2007 in Rio de Janeiro, Brazil, and 2011 in Guadalajara, Mexico), and at the Central American and Caribbean Games (2006 in Cartagena, Colombia, and 2010 in Mayagüez, Puerto Rico).

Vivenes represented Venezuela at the 2008 Summer Olympics in Beijing, where he competed as a lone male wrestler in the men's 96 kg class. He received a bye for the second preliminary round, before losing out to Kazakhstan's Taimuraz Tigiyev, who was able to score nine points in two straight periods, leaving Vivenes without a single point. Because his opponent advanced further into the final match, Vivenes offered another shot for the bronze medal by entering the repechage bouts. He was defeated by Cuba's Michel Batista in the first round, with a technical score of 1–3.
