= Korey Jarvis =

Canadian wrestler (born 1986)

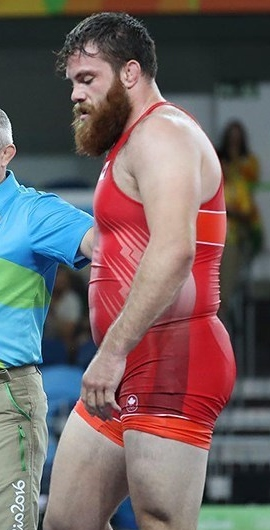
- Jarvis at the 2016 Olympics

Personal information
- Born: October 4, 1986 (age 39) Elliot Lake, Ontario, Canada
- Height: 1.88 m (6 ft 2 in)
- Weight: 118 kg (260 lb)

Sport
- Sport: Freestyle wrestling
- Club: University of Guelph
- Coached by: Doug Cox (Club); Zoltan Hunyady (Club); Gia Sissaouri (National)

Achievements and titles
- Highest world ranking: 7th (2017)
Medal record
Men's freestyle wrestling
Representing Canada
Pan American Games
Silver medal – second place	2015 Toronto	125 kg
Bronze medal – third place	2019 Lima	125 kg
Commonwealth Games
Gold medal – first place	2014 Glasgow	125 kg
Silver medal – second place	2010 Delhi	96 kg
Silver medal – second place	2018 Gold Coast	125 kg
- Updated on August 19, 2022

Korey Jarvis (born October 4, 1986) is a Canadian wrestler who most notably won a gold medal in the 125 kg category in men's freestyle wrestling at the 2014 Commonwealth Games. He has additionally, competed and won the Canadian National Wrestling Championships for three consecutive years in both freestyle and Greco-Roman styles, the only wrestler to have done so. In July 2016, he was officially named to Canada's 2016 Olympic team. At the 2016 Summer Olympics in Rio, he placed 8th in the 125 kg category in men's freestyle wrestling. Jarvis most recently placed 7th in the 125 kg category in men's freestyle wrestling at the 2017 World Wrestling Championships in Paris, France.

Jarvis studied at the Conestoga College, and has a daughter Brynlee. He took up wrestling aged 14. Between 2010 and 2014 he moved from the 96 kg to 125 kg class to avoid cutting weight before competitions, as he was normally heavier than 100 kg.
