= Anzor Khizriev =

Russian freestyle wrestler (born 1990)

Anzor Khizriev Анзор Хизриев
Personal information
- Full name: Anzor Ruslanovich Khizriev
- National team: Russia
- Born: October 31, 1990 (age 35) Chechen–Ingush ASSR, Russian SFSR, Soviet Union
- Height: 1.91 m (6 ft 3 in)
- Weight: 125 kg (276 lb)

Sport
- Country: Russia
- Sport: Wrestling
- Event: Freestyle
- Club: SVSM WC
- Coached by: R. Magomedov, M.Andreev
Medal record
Men's freestyle wrestling
Representing Russia
European Games
Gold medal – first place	2019 Minsk	125 kg
European Championships
Bronze medal – third place	2019 Bucharest	125 kg
Golden Grand Prix Ivan Yarygin
Gold medal – first place	2022 Krasnoyarsk	125 kg
Gold medal – first place	2019 Krasnoyarsk	125 kg
Silver medal – second place	2014 Krasnoyarsk	120 kg
Silver medal – second place	2018 Krasnoyarsk	125 kg
Silver medal – second place	2024 Krasnoyarsk	125 kg
Bronze medal – third place	2016 Krasnoyarsk	125 kg
Poddubny wrestling league
Bronze medal – third place	2022 Moscow	125 kg
Representing Saint Petersburg
Russian Wrestling Championships
Bronze medal – third place	2016 Sakha	125 kg
Representing Leningrad Oblast
Russian Wrestling Championships
Gold medal – first place	2017 Ingushetia	125 kg
Bronze medal – third place	2020 Naro-Fominsk	125 kg
Bronze medal – third place	2021 Buryatia	125 kg
Representing Chechnya
Russian Wrestling Championships
Gold medal – first place	2018 Odintsovo	125 kg

Anzor Ruslanovich Khizriev (Russian: Анзор Русланович Хизриев; born 31 October 1990 in Chechnya) is a Russian freestyle wrestler of Chechen descent, who competes in the 125 kg weight category. Senior European Games gold medalist 2019, he came in 5th at the 2018 World Championships.

== Background ==
Khizriev was born in Chechnya, but at the age of five his family fled to St. Petersburg, Leningrad Oblast after the First Chechen War erupted. He started training in freestyle wrestling in primary school, but in the high school years he retired. After finishing Saint Petersburg State Medical Academy study he got the degree in surgery and returned to wrestling.

== Wrestling career ==
Khizriev represents Leningrad Oblast in Russian national championships. He is two-times Russian national champion. He represented the Russian Federation at the World Championships 2017 and 2018.

At Ivan Yarygin 2019 he beat Olympic gold medalist and 2-time world champion Taha Akgül of Turkey.

== Championships and achievements ==
- 2016 Russian nationals – 3rd.
- 2017 Russian nationals champion.
- 2018 Russian nationals champion.
- 2020 Russian nationals – 3rd.
- 2021 Russian nationals – 3rd.
- 2014 Ivan Yarygin Grand-Prix – 2nd.
- 2016 Ivan Yarygin Grand-Prix – 3rd.
- 2018 Ivan Yarygin Grand-Prix – 2nd.
- 2019 Ivan Yarygin Grand-Prix – 1st.
- 2021 Ivan Yarygin Grand-Prix – 1st.
- 2017 World Championships – 5th.
- 2018 World Championships – 5th.
