= Dániel Ligeti =

Hungarian freestyle wrestler (born 1989)

Personal information
- Nationality: Hungary
- Born: 31 July 1989 (age 37) Szombathely, Hungary
- Height: 1.92 m (6 ft 4 in)
- Weight: 115 kg (254 lb)

Sport
- Style: Freestyle
- Club: Haladás VSE
- Coach: István Gulyás
Medal record
Men's freestyle wrestling
Representing Hungary
European Championships
Silver medal – second place	2012 Belgrade	120 kg
Bronze medal – third place	2011 Dortmund	120 kg
Bronze medal – third place	2014 Vantaa	125 kg
Bronze medal – third place	2022 Budapest	125 kg
Bronze medal – third place	2023 Zagreb	125 kg
World Cup
Gold medal – first place	2011 Makhachkala	120 kg
Yasar Dogu Tournament
Bronze medal – third place	2019 Istanbul	125 kg
Bronze medal – third place	2022 Istanbul	125 kg
Dan Kolov & Nikola Petrov Tournament
Bronze medal – third place	2017 Russe	125 kg
Bronze medal – third place	2019 Russe	125 kg
Grand Prix
Gold medal – first place	2010 Dortmund	120 kg
Gold medal – first place	2011 London	120 kg
Gold medal – first place	2016 Madrid	125 kg
Gold medal – first place	2017 Warsaw	125 kg
Gold medal – first place	2019 Yakutsk	125 kg
Silver medal – second place	2012 Madrid	120 kg
Silver medal – second place	2017 Tbilisi	125 kg
Silver medal – second place	2017 Paris	125 kg
Silver medal – second place	2017 Kyiv	125 kg
Silver medal – second place	2020 Warsaw	125 kg
Silver medal – second place	2023 Budapest	125 kg
Bronze medal – third place	2011 Madrid	120 kg
Bronze medal – third place	2011 Poznan	120 kg
Bronze medal – third place	2013 Kiev	120 kg
Bronze medal – third place	2013 Makhachkala	120 kg
Bronze medal – third place	2015 Paris	125 kg
Bronze medal – third place	2020 Rome	125 kg
Bronze medal – third place	2023 Zagreb	125 kg
World University Championship
Bronze medal – third place	2010 Torino	120 kg
European Juniors Championships
Silver medal – second place	2012 Kosice	96 kg
Men's Beach wrestling
Beach Wrestling World Series
Gold medal – first place	2024 Porec	+90 kg
Representing SC Siegfried Kleinostheim
Bundesliga
Silver medal – second place	2023/24	Team

Dániel Ligeti (born July 31, 1989) is an amateur Hungarian freestyle wrestler, who competes in the men's super heavyweight category. He won the bronze medal for his division at the 2011 European Wrestling Championships in Dortmund, Germany, and silver at the 2012 European Wrestling Championships in Belgrade, Serbia. Ligeti stands 1.92 metres (6 ft 3.5 in) tall and weighs 115 kilograms (254 lb). He is also currently a member of TuS Adelhausen in Rheinfelden, Baden-Württemberg, Germany, and is coached by Istvan Gulyas from the national wrestling team.

Ligeti represented Hungary at the 2012 Summer Olympics in London, where he competed in the 120 kg class in men's freestyle wrestling. He received a bye for the second preliminary match, before losing out to Belarus' Aleksey Shemarov, who was able to score four points in two straight periods, leaving Ligeti with a single point.

He competed at the 2016 Olympics, beating Florian Temengil to reach the quarter finals where he lost to Levan Berianidze. In March 2021, he competed at the European Qualification Tournament in Budapest, Hungary hoping to qualify for the 2020 Summer Olympics in Tokyo, Japan.

In 2022, he won one of the bronze medals in his event at the Yasar Dogu Tournament held in Istanbul, Turkey. He also won one of the bronze medals in the 125 kg event at the 2022 European Wrestling Championships held in Budapest, Hungary. He competed in the 125 kg event at the 2022 World Wrestling Championships held in Belgrade, Serbia.

He competed at the 2024 European Wrestling Olympic Qualification Tournament in Baku, Azerbaijan hoping to qualify for the 2024 Summer Olympics in Paris, France. He was eliminated in his first match and he did not qualify for the Olympics. A month later, he earned a quota place for Hungary for the Olympics at the 2024 World Wrestling Olympic Qualification Tournament held in Istanbul, Turkey. He competed in the men's freestyle 125 kg event at the Olympics.
