= Taha Akgül =

Turkish freestyle wrestler

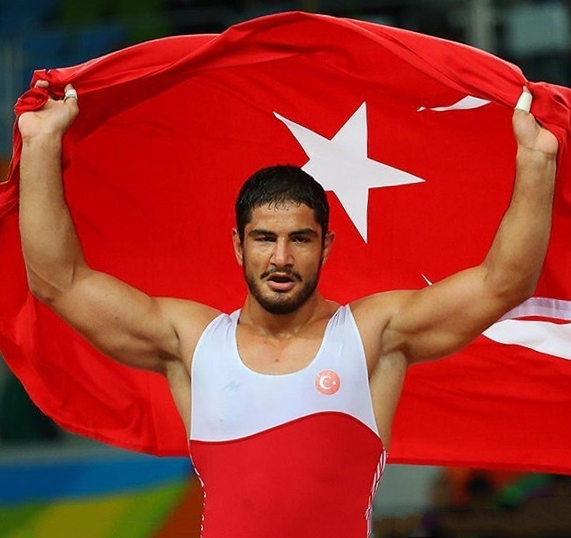
- Akgül at the 2016 Summer Olympics

Personal information
- Nationality: Turkish
- Born: 22 November 1990 (age 35) Sivas, Turkey
- Height: 1.92 m (6 ft 4 in)
- Weight: 125 kg (276 lb)

Sport
- Sport: Wrestling
- Event: Freestyle
- Club: Ankara ASKI Sports Club
- Turned pro: 2010
- Coached by: Abdullah Çakmar
- Retired: 2024

Achievements and titles
- Highest world ranking: 1 (2022)
Medal record
Event	1st	2nd	3rd
Olympic Games	1	0	2
World Championship	3	2	3
European Championships	11	0	0
European Games	1	0	0
Military World Games	1	0	0
Mediterranean Games	1	0	0
World Cup	1	0	0
Yasar Dogu Tournament	7	0	1
Other	5	3	0
Total	31	5	6
Men's freestyle wrestling
Representing Turkey
Olympic Games
Gold medal – first place	2016 Rio de Janeiro	125 kg
Bronze medal – third place	2020 Tokyo	125 kg
Bronze medal – third place	2024 Paris	125 kg
World Championships
Gold medal – first place	2014 Tashkent	125 kg
Gold medal – first place	2015 Las Vegas	125 kg
Gold medal – first place	2022 Belgrade	125 kg
Silver medal – second place	2017 Paris	125 kg
Silver medal – second place	2019 Nur-Sultan	125 kg
Bronze medal – third place	2013 Budapest	120 kg
Bronze medal – third place	2021 Oslo	125 kg
Bronze medal – third place	2023 Belgrade	125 kg
European Championships
Gold medal – first place	2012 Belgrade	120 kg
Gold medal – first place	2013 Tbilisi	120 kg
Gold medal – first place	2014 Vantaa	125 kg
Gold medal – first place	2017 Novi Sad	125 kg
Gold medal – first place	2018 Kaspiysk	125 kg
Gold medal – first place	2019 Bucharest	125 kg
Gold medal – first place	2021 Warsaw	125 kg
Gold medal – first place	2022 Budapest	125 kg
Gold medal – first place	2023 Zagreb	125 kg
Gold medal – first place	2024 Bucharest	125 kg
European Games
Gold medal – first place	2015 Baku	125 kg
Military World Games
Gold medal – first place	2019 Wuhan	125 kg
Mediterranean Games
Gold medal – first place	2013 Mersin	120 kg
Universiade
Gold medal – first place	2013 Kazan	120 kg
World University Championship
Gold medal – first place	2012 Kuortane	120 kg
World Cup
Gold medal – first place	2013 Tehran	120 kg
Yasar Dogu Tournament
Gold medal – first place	2012 Ankara	120 kg
Gold medal – first place	2013 Ankara	120 kg
Gold medal – first place	2014 Istanbul	125 kg
Gold medal – first place	2015 Istanbul	125 kg
Gold medal – first place	2016 Istanbul	125 kg
Gold medal – first place	2019 Istanbul	125 kg
Gold medal – first place	2022 Istanbul	125 kg
Bronze medal – third place	2011 Istanbul	120 kg
Golden Grand Prix Ivan Yarygin
Silver medal – second place	2019 Krasnoyarsk	125 kg
Golden Grand Prix
Gold medal – first place	2011 Baku	120 kg
Grand Prix
Gold medal – first place	2018 La Habana	125 kg
Gold medal – first place	2023 Alexandria	125 kg
Silver medal – second place	2012 Siedlce	120 kg
Silver medal – second place	2012 Moscow	120 kg
Bronze medal – third place	2011 London	120 kg
World Juniors Championships
Silver medal – second place	2010 Budapest	120 kg

Taha Akgül (born 22 November 1990 in Sivas) is an Olympic, World, European champion, and Turkish retired freestyle wrestler competing in the 125 kg division. He is a 3 time world (2014, 2015, 2022) and 11 time European (2012-2015, 2017-2019, 2021-2024) champion. He won the gold medal in the 2016 Summer Olympics and the bronze medal in the 2020 Summer Olympics as well as in the 2024 Summer Olympics at 125 kg. He is a graduate of the Karamanoğlu Mehmetbey University Physical Education and Sports Academy and completed his master's degree at Sivas Cumhuriyet University. He is the current president of the Turkish Wrestling Federation.

== Wrestling career ==
Akgül took up wrestling in 2003 following his father and brother. He won the gold medal at the 40th Yaşar Doğu International Wrestling Tournament held in 2012. At the 2012 European Wrestling Championships held in Belgrade, Serbia, Taha Akgül became champion in his weight category. He qualified for the 2012 Olympics. He did not advance to quarterfinal after losing to Bilyal Makhov from Russia in the round of 16. At the 2012 World University Wrestling Championships held in Kuortane, Finland, he became gold medallist in his weight class.

Taha Akgül defended his European champion title at the 2013 European Wrestling Championships held in Tbilisi, Georgia. He won the bronze medal at the 2013 World Wrestling Championships in Budapest, Hungary.

In 2014 and 2015 he won the world title in the 125 kg division. In 2014 he named as the Best Wrestler of the Year by the Turkish Wrestling Federation. He won a gold medal at the 2016 Olympics, defeating Komeil Ghasemi in the final.

Taha Akgul won the gold medal at the 2017 European Wrestling Championships in Serbia on Friday.

World Championships 2017, Paris: It was a dramatic gold medal match. Akgul scored the first point on the counter in less than one minute into the game. The Turkish international continued to dominate the first period by taking a four-point lead. But the Georgian wrestler turned the tables in his favour in the dying seconds of the first half. Within one minute he covered the four-point lead by two successive takedowns, levelling the score at 4-4. In the second half, both the wrestlers went into attacking mode. With a series of attacks, the wrestlers were drawn at 8-8. But in the final 10 seconds of the bout, Petriashvili executed a two-pointer move and became the world champion.

Taha Akgul won gold medals on Sunday at the European Wrestling Championships held in Kaspiysk in Russia's northern Caucasus Republic of Dagestan. He won against Georgian wrestler Geno Petriashvili 2-1 to become the European champion in the 125-kilogram category.

Taha Akgul comes second in World Wrestling C'ships. Akgul wins silver medal in World Wrestling Championships, losing to Georgia's Petriashvili in men's freestyle final.

Taha Akgül on 22 April won gold in the 2021 European Championships in Warsaw. Akgül secured his eighth European title as the 30-year-old beat his Russian opponent Sergei Kozyrev via disqualification (9-2) in the men's freestyle 125-kilogram final. He had previously won gold in the 2016 Rio de Janeiro Olympic Games. Speaking to Anadolu Agency (AA) about his latest success, Akgül said winning the tournament after being forced to a nearly two-year hiatus due to injury was a great morale boost for him. “I won my 8th European title after defeating my rivals with overwhelming superiority. It was really important for me to win a gold medal, considering I joined straight to European Championships after my 1.5-year break. And the Olympics is so close,” Akgül said, adding that he would be aiming for a second Olympic gold medal at Tokyo 2020.

In 2022, he won the gold medal in his event at the Yasar Dogu Tournament held in Istanbul, Turkey. He won the gold medal in the men's 125 kg event at the 2022 European Wrestling Championships held in Budapest, Hungary. Akgül claimed a 5–2 victory over Geno Petriashvili from Georgia in the 125 kg freestyle division in Hungary's capital. Taha Akgul won his ninth gold medal in the 125 kg freestyle division. He won the gold medal in the men's 125 kg event at the 2022 World Wrestling Championships held in Belgrade, Serbia. United World Wrestling has announced Taha Akgul as the 2022 Freestyle Wrestler of the Year after his three title-winning performances in 2022.

In 2023, Taha Akgül became the European champion for the 10th time by defeating his Georgian opponent Geno Petriashvili 9-4 in the 125 kg freestyle category at the 2022 European Wrestling Championships. Taha defeated Giorgi Meshvildishvili, competing for Azerbaijan, 3-1 and advanced to the semifinals. In the semifinal, Taha faced Abraham de Jesus Conyedo Ruano competing for Italy, beating his opponent 4-0. He won the bronze medal in the men's 125 kg event at the 2023 World Wrestling Championships held in Belgrade, Serbia.

He won the gold medal in the men's 125 kg event at the 2024 European Wrestling Championships held in Bucharest, Romania. He reached the final after defeating Poland's Kamil Kosciolek in the first round, Ukraine's Murazi Mchedlidze in the quarterfinals and another Georgian, Giorgi Meshvildishvili of Azerbaijan, in the semifinals with 10-0 technical victories. In the final, he defeated Geno Petriashvili of Georgia and became the European champion for the 11th time.

Taha Akgül won one of bronze medals at the 2024 Summer Olympics in Paris, France by defeating his Kyrgyz rival Aiaal Lazarev 7-0 in the third place match in the men's freestyle 125 kg competition. Taha Akgül reached the semifinals by beating Puerto Rican Jonovan Smith 10-0 with technical superiority in the first round and Hungarian Dániel Ligeti 8-0 in the quarterfinals. In the semifinals, he faced Iranian Amir Hossein Zare. While the match was 1-1 in Taha's favor, with 30 seconds left, the Algerian referee Belkacem Trai gave Taha a warning even though he was more active, and as a result, he lost the match 2-1 and lost the bronze medal. After the end of the bronze medal match, he took off his shoes and left them on the mat and announced that he was ending his career.

== Major results ==
Year	Tournament	Location	Result	Event
2024	Summer Olympics	Paris, France	3rd	Freestyle 125 kg
2024	European Championships	Bucharest, Romania	1st	Freestyle 125 kg
2023	World Championships	Belgrade, Serbia	3rd	Freestyle 125 kg
2023	European Championships	Zagreb, Croatia	1st	Freestyle 125 kg
2022	World Championships	Belgrade, Serbia	1st	Freestyle 125 kg
2022	European Championships	Budapest, Hungary	1st	Freestyle 125 kg
2021	Summer Olympics	Tokyo, Japan	3rd	Freestyle 125 kg
2021	World Championships	Oslo, Norway	3rd	Freestyle 125 kg
2021	European Championships	Warsaw, Poland	1st	Freestyle 125 kg
2019	World Championships	Nur-Sultan, Kazakhstan	2nd	Freestyle 125 kg
2019	European Championships	Bucharest, Romania	1st	Freestyle 125 kg
2019	Military World Games	Wuhan, China	1st	Freestyle 125 kg
2018	European Championships	Kaspiysk, Russia	1st	Freestyle 125 kg
2017	World Championships	Paris, France	2nd	Freestyle 125 kg
2017	European Championships	Novi Sad, Serbia	1st	Freestyle 125 kg
2016	Summer Olympics	Rio de Janeiro, Brazil	1st	Freestyle 125 kg
2015	World Championships	Las Vegas, United States	1st	Freestyle 125 kg
2015	European Games	Baku, Azerbaijan	1st	Freestyle 125 kg
2014	World Championships	Tashkent, Uzbekistan	1st	Freestyle 125 kg
2014	European Championships	Vantaa, Finland	1st	Freestyle 125 kg
2013	World Championships	Budapest, Hungary	3rd	Freestyle 120 kg
2013	European Championships	Belgrade, Serbia	1st	Freestyle 120 kg
2013	Mediterranean Games	Mersin, Turkey	1st	Freestyle 120 kg
2013	Summer Universiade	Kazan, Russia	1st	Freestyle 120 kg
2012	European Championships	Belgrade, Serbia	1st	Freestyle 120 kg

== Wrestling record ==
Res.	Record	Opponent	Score	Date	Event	Location
2024 Olympic Games (bronze) at 125 kg
Win	158-11	(Kyrgyzstan) Aiaal Lazarev	7-0	10 August 2024	2024 Olympic Games	(France) Paris
Loss	157-11	(Iran) Amir Hossein Zare	1-2	9 August 2024	2024 Olympic Games	(France) Paris
Win	157-10	(Hungary) Dániel Ligeti	8-0	9 August 2024	2024 Olympic Games	(France) Paris
Win	156-10	(Puerto Rico) Jonovan Smith	10–0 Tech Fall	9 August 2024	2024 Olympic Games	(France) Paris
2024 European Championships (gold) at 125 kg
Win	155-10	(Georgia (country)) Geno Petriashvili	5-4	18 February 2024	2024 European Championship	(Romania) Bucharest
Win	154-10	(Azerbaijan) Giorgi Meshvildishvili	10–0 Tech Fall	17 February 2024	2024 European Championship	(Romania) Bucharest
Win	153-10	(Ukraine) Murazi Mchedlidze	10–0 Tech Fall	17 February 2024	2024 European Championship	(Romania) Bucharest
Win	152-10	(Poland) Kamil Kościółek	10–0 Tech Fall	17 February 2024	2024 European Championship	(Romania) Bucharest
2023 World Championship (bronze) at 125 kg
Win	151-10	(Hungary) Dániel Ligeti	5-0	17 September 2023	2023 World Championship	(Serbia) Belgrad
Loss	150-10	(Iran) Amir Hossein Zare	0-4	16 September 2023	2023 World Championship	(Serbia) Belgrad
Win	150-9	(Ukraine) Oleksandr Khotsianivskyi	3-0	16 September 2023	2023 World Championship	(Serbia) Belgrad
Win	149-9	(Azerbaijan) Giorgi Meshvildishvili	2-0	16 September 2023	2023 World Championship	(Serbia) Belgrad
Win	148-9	(Mexico) Eduardo García	11–0 Tech Fall	16 September 2023	2023 World Championship	(Serbia) Belgrad
2023 European Championships (gold) at 125 kg
Win	147-9	(Georgia (country)) Geno Petriashvili	9–4	19 April 2023	2023 European Championships	(Croatia) Zagreb
Win	146-9	(Italy) Abraham Conyedo	4-0	18 April 2023	2023 European Championships	(Croatia) Zagreb
Win	145-9	(Azerbaijan) Giorgi Meshvildishvili	3–1	18 April 2023	2023 European Championships	(Croatia) Zagreb
Ibrahim Moustafa 2023 (gold) at 125 kg
Win	144-9	(Poland) Kamil Kosciolek	5-0	25 February 2023	Ibrahim Moustafa 2023	(Egypt) Alexandria
Win	143-9	(United States) Nick Gwiazdowski	7-2	25 February 2023	Ibrahim Moustafa 2023	(Egypt) Alexandria
Win	142-9	(India) Dinesh	11–0 Tech Fall	25 February 2023	Ibrahim Moustafa 2023	(Egypt) Alexandria
Win	141-9	(Kazakhstan) Yusup Batirmurzaev	7–0	25 February 2023	Ibrahim Moustafa 2023	(Egypt) Alexandria
2022 World Championship (gold) at 125 kg
Win	140-9	(Mongolia) Mönkhtöriin Lkhagvagerel	6-2	16 September 2022	2022 World Championship	(Serbia) Belgrade
Win	139-9	(Iran) Amir Hossein Zare	4-2	15 September 2022	2022 World Championship	(Serbia) Belgrade
Win	138-9	(Canada) Amar Dhesi	8–2	15 September 2022	2022 World Championship	(Serbia) Belgrade
Win	137-9	(Hungary) Dániel Ligeti	4–0	15 September 2022	2022 World Championship	(Serbia) Belgrade
2022 European Championships (gold) at 125 kg
Win	136-9	(Georgia (country)) Geno Petriashvili	5–2	30 March 2022	2022 European Championships	(Hungary) Budapest
Win	135-9	(Hungary) Dániel Ligeti	10–0 Tech Fall	29 March 2022	2022 European Championships	(Hungary) Budapest
Win	134-9	(Serbia) Magomedgadzhi Nurasulov	5–0	29 March 2022	2022 European Championships	(Hungary) Budapest
Yasar Dogu 2022 (gold) at 125 kg
Win	133-9	(Mongolia) Mönkhtöriin Lkhagvagerel	10-0 Tech Fall	26 February 2022	Yasar Dogu 2022	(Turkey) Istanbul
Win	132-9	(Hungary) Dániel Ligeti	3-0	26 February 2022	Yasar Dogu 2022	(Turkey) Istanbul
Win	131-9	(Kazakhstan) Oleg Boltin	6–1	26 February 2022	Yasar Dogu 2022	(Turkey) Istanbul
Win	130-9	(Serbia) Magomedgadzhi Nurasulov	7–2	26 February 2022	Yasar Dogu 2022	(Turkey) Istanbul
Win	129-9	(Slovakia) Gabriel Tysz	11–0 Tech Fall	26 February 2022	Yasar Dogu 2022	(Turkey) Istanbul
2021 World Championship (bronze) at 125 kg
Win	128-9	(United States) Nick Gwiazdowski	6-4	3 October 2021	2021 World Championship	(Norway) Oslo
Loss	127-9	(Iran) Amir Hossein Zare	0-4	2 October 2021	2021 World Championship	(Norway) Oslo
Win	127–8	(Russia) Zelimkhan Khizriev	5–0	2 October 2021	2021 World Championship	(Norway) Oslo
Win	126–8	(Poland) Robert Baran	5–0	2 October 2021	2021 World Championship	(Norway) Oslo
2020 Olympic Games (bronze) at 125 kg
Win	125–8	(Mongolia) Mönkhtöriin Lkhagvagerel	5–0	6 August 2021	2020 Olympic Games	(Japan) Tokyo
Win	124–8	(Kyrgyzstan) Aiaal Lazarev	4–0	6 August 2021	2020 Olympic Games	(Japan) Tokyo
Loss	123–8	(United States) Gable Steveson	0–8	5 August 2021	2020 Olympic Games	(Japan) Tokyo
Win	123–7	(Canada) Amar Dhesi	5–0	5 August 2021	2020 Olympic Games	(Japan) Tokyo
2021 European Championships (gold) at 125 kg
Win	122–7	(Russia) Sergei Kozyrev	9-2	21 April 2021	2021 European Championship	(Poland) Warsaw
Win	121–7	(Belarus) Dzianis Khramiankou	4-0	20 April 2021	2021 European Championship	(Poland) Warsaw
Win	120–7	(Poland) Kamil Kosciolek	6–1	20 April 2021	2021 European Championship	(Poland) Warsaw
Win	119–7	(Georgia (country)) Geno Petriashvili	6–1	20 April 2021	2021 European Championship	(Poland) Warsaw
2020 Turkey Wrestling Championships (gold) at 125 kg
Win	118–7	(Turkey) Tanju Gemici	10–0 Tech Fall	22 December 2019	2020 Turkey Championships	(Turkey) Ankara
Win	117–7	(Turkey) Hüseyin Civelek	10–0 Tech Fall	21 December 2019	2020 Turkey Championships	(Turkey) Ankara
Win	116–7	(Turkey) Mustafa Tayyip Küçük	10–0 Tech Fall	21 December 2019	2020 Turkey Championships	(Turkey) Ankara
Win	115–7	(Turkey) Enes Kaan	12–2 Tech Fall	21 December 2019	2020 Turkey Championships	(Turkey) Ankara
Win	114–7	(Turkey) Adil Mısırcı	10–0 Tech Fall	21 December 2019	2020 Turkey Championships	(Turkey) Ankara
2019 Bundesliga tournament (gold) at 125 kg
Win	113–7	(Germany) Robin Ferdinand	19–4 Tech Fall	16 November 2019	2019 Bundesliga Tournament	(Germany) Hockenheim
Win	112–7	(Germany) Nico Graf	16–0 Tech Fall	RKG Reilingen-Hockenheim	2019 Bundesliga Tournament	(Germany) Hockenheim
Win	111–7	(Germany) Alexander Kleer	16–0 Tech Fall	RKG Reilingen-Hockenheim	2019 Bundesliga Tournament	(Germany) Hockenheim
2019 Military World Games (gold) at 125 kg
Win	110–7	(Iran) Yadollah Mohebbi	3–0	22 October 2019	2019 Military World Games	(China) Wuhan
Win	109–7	(Poland) Robert Baran	8–1	21 October 2019	2019 Military World Games	(China) Wuhan
Win	108–7	(Ukraine) Aleksandr Goldovski	4–0	21 October 2019	2019 Military World Games	(China) Wuhan
Win	107–7	(Turkmenistan) Sohbet Belliyev	5–0	21 October 2019	2019 Military World Games	(China) Wuhan
2019 World Championship (silver) at 125 kg
Loss	106–7	(Georgia (country)) Geno Petriashvili	6–6	21 September 2019	2019 World Championship	(Kazakhstan) Nur-Sultan
Win	106-6	(China) Deng Zhiwei	10–0 Tech Fall	20 September 2019	2019 World Championship	(Kazakhstan) Nur-Sultan
Win	105–6	(Uzbekistan) Khasanboy Rakhimov	3–0	20 September 2019	2019 World Championship	(Kazakhstan) Nur-Sultan
Win	104–6	(Mongolia) Alexander Romanov	8–0	20 September 2019	2019 World Championship	(Kazakhstan) Nur-Sultan
2019 Yasar Dogu Tournament (gold) at 125 kg
Win	103–6	(United States) Nick Gwiazdowski	5–1	14 July 2019	2019 Yasar Dogu	(Turkey) Istanbul
Win	102–6	(Iran) Yadollah Mohebbi	10–0 Tech Fall	July 13, 2019	2019 Yasar Dogu	(Turkey) Istanbul
Win	101–6	(Hungary) Daniel Ligeti	5–2	July 13, 2019	2019 Yasar Dogu	(Turkey) Istanbul
2019 European Championship (gold) at 125 kg
Win	100–6	(Georgia (country)) Geno Petriashvili	7–0	10 April 2019	2019 European Championship	(Romania) Bucharest
Win	99–6	(Russia) Anzor Khizriev	8–1	April 9, 2019	2019 European Championship	(Romania) Bucharest
Win	98–6	(Armenia) Andranik Galstyan	11–0 Tech Fall	April 9, 2019	2019 European Championship	(Romania) Bucharest
Win	97–6	(Romania) Rareș Chintoan	7–1	April 9, 2019	2019 European Championship	(Romania) Bucharest
Golden Grand Prix Ivan Yarygin 2019 (silver) at 125 kg
Loss	96–6	(Russia) Anzor Khizriev	3–7	25 January 2019	Ivan Yarygin 2019	(Russia) Krasnoyarsk
Win	96–5	(China) Deng Zhiwei	10–0 Tech Fall	25 January 2019	Ivan Yarygin 2019	(Russia) Krasnoyarsk
Win	95–5	(Cuba) Alpajon Estevez	10–0 Tech Fall	25 January 2019	Ivan Yarygin 2019	(Russia) Krasnoyarsk
Win	94–5	(Russia) Zelimkhan Khizriev	11–0 Tech Fall	25 January 2019	Ivan Yarygin 2019	(Russia) Krasnoyarsk
2018 World Championship at 125 kg
Loss	93–5	(Iran) Parviz Hadi	2–3	20 October 2018	2018 World Championship	(Hungary) Budapest
Win	93–4	(Ukraine) Oleksandr Khotsianivskyi	7–0	20 October 2018	2018 World Championship	(Hungary) Budapest
Win	92–4	(Germany) Nick Matuhin	9–0	20 October 2018	2018 World Championship	(Hungary) Budapest
2018 European Championship (gold) at 125 kg
Win	91–4	(Georgia (country)) Geno Petriashvili	2–1	6 May 2018	2018 European Championship	(Russia) Kaspiysk
Win	90–4	(Russia) Muradin Kushkhov	3–0	5 May 2018	2018 European Championship	(Russia) Kaspiysk
Win	89–4	(Azerbaijan) Jamaladdin Magomedov	4–2	5 May 2018	2018 European Championship	(Russia) Kaspiysk
Win	88–4	(Belarus) Ibrahim Saidau	5–0	5 May 2018	2018 European Championship	(Russia) Kaspiysk
2018 Granma y Cerro Pelado Tournament (gold) at 125 kg
Win	87–4	(United States) Ben Durbin	11–0 Tech Fall	15 February 2018	2018 Granma y Cerro Pelado	(Cuba) La Habana
Win	86–4	(Uzbekistan) Davit Modzmanashvili	8–1	14 February 2018	2018 Granma y Cerro Pelado	(Cuba) La Habana
Win	85–4	(Ukraine) Alen Zasyeyev	7–0	14 February 2018	2018 Granma y Cerro Pelado	(Cuba) La Habana
Win	84–4	(Armenia) Garik Barseghyan	11–0 Tech Fall	14 February 2018	2018 Granma y Cerro Pelado	(Cuba) La Habana
2017 World Championship (silver) at 125 kg
Loss	83–4	(Georgia (country)) Geno Petriashvili	8–10	25 August 2017	2017 World Championship	(France) Paris
Win	83–3	(United States) Nick Gwiazdowski	10–0 Tech Fall	24 August 2017	2017 World Championship	(France) Paris
Win	82–3	(South Korea) Nam Koung-jin	12–2 Tech Fall	24 August 2017	2017 World Championship	(France) Paris
Win	81–3	(Mongolia) Natsagsürengiin Zolboo	8–0	24 August 2017	2017 World Championship	(France) Paris
2017 European Championship (gold) at 125 kg
Win	80–3	(Azerbaijan) Jamaladdin Magomedov	8–2	5 May 2017	2017 European Championship	(Slovakia) Novi Sad
Win	79–3	(Hungary) Dániel Ligeti	5–0	5 May 2017	2017 European Championship	(Slovakia) Novi Sad
Win	78–3	(Georgia (country)) Geno Petriashvili	14–4 Tech Fall	5 May 2017	2017 European Championship	(Slovakia) Novi Sad
Win	77–3	(Ukraine) Danylo Kartavyi	9–2	5 May 2017	2017 European Championship	(Slovakia) Novi Sad
2016 Olympic Games (gold) at 125 kg
Win	76–3	(Iran) Komeil Ghasemi	3–1	20 August 2016	2016 Olympic Games	(Brazil) Rio de Janeiro
Win	75–3	(Armenia) Levan Berianidze	8–1	20 August 2016	2016 Olympic Games	(Brazil) Rio de Janeiro
Win	74–3	(Belarus) Ibrahim Saidau	11–0 Tech Fall	20 August 2016	2016 Olympic Games	(Brazil) Rio de Janeiro
Win	73–3	(Mongolia) Jargalsaikhany Chuluunbat	10–0 Tech Fall	20 August 2016	2016 Olympic Games	(Brazil) Rio de Janeiro
2016 European Championship at 125 kg
Loss	72–3	(Georgia (country)) Geno Petriashvili	8-8	11 March 2016	2016 European Championship	(Latvia) Riga
2016 Yasar Dogu Tournament (gold) at 125 kg
Win	72–2	(United States) Tony Nelson	10–0 Tech Fall	7 February 2016	2016 Yasar Dogu	(Turkey) Istanbul
Win	71–2	(Azerbaijan) Jamaladdin Magomedov	12–1	6 February 2016	2016 Yasar Dogu	(Turkey) Istanbul
Win	70–2	(Turkey) Yasin Kılıç	9–1	6 February 2016	2016 Yasar Dogu	(Turkey) Istanbul
2015 World Championship (gold) at 125 kg
Win	69–2	(Azerbaijan) Jamaladdin Magomedov	10–0 Tech Fall	12 September 2015	2015 World Championship	(United States) Las Vegas, NV
Win	68–2	(Russia) Bilyal Makhov	10–0 Tech Fall	11 September 2015	2015 World Championship	(United States) Las Vegas, NV
Win	67–2	(Kazakhstan) Daulet Shabanbay	6–1	11 September 2015	2015 World Championship	(United States) Las Vegas, NV
Win	66–2	(Armenia) Levan Berianidze	4–2	11 September 2015	2015 World Championship	(United States) Las Vegas, NV
Win	65–2	(Spain) José Cuba	11–0 Tech Fall	11 September 2015	2015 World Championship	(United States) Las Vegas, NV
2015 European Games (gold) at 125 kg
Win	64–2	(Belarus) Aleksey Shemarov	6–0	18 June 2015	2015 European Games	(Azerbaijan) Baku
Win	63–2	(Slovakia) Soslan Gagloev	Fall	18 June 2015	2015 European Games	(Azerbaijan) Baku
Win	62–2	(Poland) Robert Baran	Fall	18 June 2015	2015 European Games	(Azerbaijan) Baku
Win	61–2	(Azerbaijan) Jamaladdin Magomedov	5–2	18 June 2015	2015 European Games	(Azerbaijan) Baku
2015 Yasar Dogu Tournament (gold) at 125 kg
Win	60–2	(Kyrgyzstan) Aiaal Lazarev	10–0 Tech Fall	29 March 2015	2015 Yasar Dogu	(Turkey) Istanbul
Win	59–2	(Kazakhstan) Daulet Shabanbay	12–1 Tech Fall	28 March 2015	2015 Yasar Dogu	(Turkey) Istanbul
Win	58–2	(Russia) Khadzhimurat Gatsalov	10–0 Tech Fall	28 March 2015	2015 Yasar Dogu	(Turkey) Istanbul
2014 World Championship (gold) at 125 kg
Win	57–2	(Iran) Komeil Ghasemi	4–3	8 September 2014	2014 World Championship	(Uzbekistan) Tashkent
Win	56–2	(Ukraine) Aleksey Shemarov	8–1	7 September 2014	2014 World Championship	(Uzbekistan) Tashkent
Win	55–2	(United States) Tervel Dlagnev	4–2	7 September 2014	2014 World Championship	(Uzbekistan) Tashkent
Win	54–2	(Azerbaijan) Aslan Dzebisov	4–0	7 September 2014	2014 World Championship	(Uzbekistan) Tashkent
Win	53–2	(Hungary) Richárd Csercsics	10–4	7 September 2014	2014 World Championship	(Uzbekistan) Tashkent
2014 European Championship (gold) at 125 kg
Win	52–2	(Russia) Alan Khugaev	10–0 Tech Fall	3 April 2014	2014 European Championship	(Finland) Vantaa
Win	51–2	(Ukraine) Oleksandr Khotsianivskyi	10–0 Tech Fall	2 April 2014	2014 European Championship	(Finland) Vantaa
Win	50–2	(Belarus) Vadzim Shvedau	10–0 Tech Fall	2 April 2014	2014 European Championship	(Finland) Vantaa
Win	49–2	(Armenia) Andranik Galstyan	11–0 Tech Fall	2 April 2014	2014 European Championship	(Finland) Vantaa
2014 Yasar Dogu Tournament (gold) at 125 kg
Win	48–2	(Iran) Komeil Ghasemi	4–1	16 February 2014	2014 Yasar Dogu Tournament	(Turkey) Istanbul
Win	47–2	(United States) Dom Bradley	6–1	15 February 2014	2014 Yasar Dogu Tournament	(Turkey) Istanbul
Win	46–2	(Turkey) Hamza Özkaradeniz	2–0	15 February 2014	2014 Yasar Dogu Tournament	(Turkey) Istanbul
2013 Moscow Lights (gold) at 125 kg
Win	45–2	(Georgia (country)) Geno Petriashvili	10–1	8 November 2013	2013 Moscow Lights	(Russia) Moscow
Win	44–2	(Russia) Andranik Galstyan	10–0	12 November 2013	2013 Moscow Lights	(Russia) Moscow
Win	43–2	(Ukraine) Alen Zasyeyev	4–1	12 November 2013	2013 Moscow Lights	(Russia) Moscow
Win	42–2	(Bulgaria) Bimbelov Peycho	10–0	12 November 2013	2013 Moscow Lights	(Russia) Moscow
2013 World Championship (bronze) at 125 kg
Win	41–2	(United States) Tervel Dlagnev	3–0	17 September 2013	2013 World Championship	(Hungary) Budapest
Win	40–2	(Azerbaijan) Jamaladdin Magomedov	7–3	17 September 2013	2013 World Championship	(Hungary) Budapest
Win	39–2	(Palau) Florian Skilang Temengil	8–0 Tech Fall	17 September 2013	2013 World Championship	(Hungary) Budapest
Loss	38–2	(Ukraine) Alen Zasyeyev	2–6	16 September 2013	2013 World Championship	(Hungary) Budapest
Win	38–1	(Greece) Christos Nyfadopoulos	10–0 Tech Fall	16 September 2013	2013 World Championship	(Hungary) Budapest
2013 Summer Universiade (gold) at 120 kg
Win	37–1	(Ukraine) Oleksandr Khotsianivskyi	8–0 Tech Fall	16 July 2013	2013 Summer Universiade	(Russia) Kazan
Win	36–1	(Iran) Parviz Hadi	6–1	16 July 2013	2013 Summer Universiade	(Russia) Kazan
Win	35–1	(China) Deng Zhiwei	7–0	16 July 2013	2013 Summer Universiade	(Russia) Kazan
Win	34–1	(Belarus) Ibrahim Saidau	4–1	16 July 2013	2013 Summer Universiade	(Russia) Kazan
2013 Mediterranean Games (gold) at 120 kg
Win	33–1	(Tunisia) Slim Trabelsi	10–0 Tech Fall	26 June 2013	2013 Mediterranean Games	(Turkey) Mersin
Win	32–1	(Greece) Christos Nyfadopoulos	10–0 Tech Fall	25 June 2013	2013 Mediterranean Games	(Turkey) Mersin
Win	31–1	(North Macedonia) Bojan Danov	10–0 Tech Fall	25 June 2013	2013 Mediterranean Games	(Turkey) Mersin
Win	30–1	(Serbia) Pedrag Dubaic	10–0 Tech Fall	25 June 2013	2013 Mediterranean Games	(Turkey) Mersin
2013 European Championship (gold) at 120 kg
Win	29–1	(Ukraine) Alen Zasieiev	0–6, 1–0, 2–1	21 March 2013	2013 European Championship	(Georgia (country)) Tbilisi
Win	28–1	(Hungary) Daniel Ligeti	5–1, 5–3	20 March 2013	2013 European Championship	(Georgia (country)) Tbilisi
Win	27–1	(Bulgaria) Dimitar Angelov Kumchev	2–2, 3–0, 3–1	20 March 2013	2013 European Championship	(Georgia (country)) Tbilisi
Win	26–1	(Azerbaijan) Jamaladdin Magomedov	2–0, 2–0	20 March 2013	2013 European Championship	(Georgia (country)) Tbilisi
2013 World Cup (gold) at 120 kg
Win	25–1	(United States) Tervel Dlagnev	6–2	21 February 2013	2013 World Cup	(Iran) Tehran
Win	24–1	(Iran) Komeil Ghasemi	5–1	20 February 2013	2013 World Cup	(Iran) Tehran
Win	23–1	(Iran) Mohammad Reza Azarshakib	8–0	20 February 2013	2013 World Cup	(Iran) Tehran
Win	22–1	(Russia) Alan Khugaev	6–3	20 February 2013	2013 World Cup	(Iran) Tehran
Win	21–1	(Japan) Taichi Oka	11–0 Tech Fall	20 February 2013	2013 World Cup	(Iran) Tehran
2013 Yasar Dogu Tournament (gold) at 120 kg
Win	20–1	(Uzbekistan) Kurban Kurbanov	9–2	9 February 2013	2013 Yasar Dogu	(Turkey) Ankara
Win	19–1	(Azerbaijan) Jamaladdin Magomedov	6–1	9 February 2013	2013 Yasar Dogu	(Turkey) Ankara
Win	18–1	(Georgia (country)) Geno Petriashvili	6–3	9 February 2013	2013 Yasar Dogu	(Turkey) Ankara
2012 World University Championship (gold) at 120 kg
Win	17–1	(Iran) Parviz Hadi	10–0 Tech Fall	2 October 2012	2012 World University Championship	(Finland) Kuortane
Win	16–1	(Russia) Vitali Gagiev	10–2	1 October 2012	2012 World University Championship	(Finland) Kuortane
Win	15–1	(United States) Anthony Nelson	10–0 Tech-Fall	1 October 2012	2012 World University Championship	(Finland) Kuortane
Win	14–1	(Mongolia) Odgerel Bat-Ochir	7–0	1 October 2012	2012 World University Championship	(Finland) Kuortane
2012 Olympic Games 9th at 120 kg
Loss	13–1	(Russia) Bilyal Makhov	1–0, 3–0	11 August 2012	2012 Olympic Games	(United Kingdom) London
Win	13–0	(Ukraine) Oleksandr Khotsianivskyi	1–0, 2–0	11 August 2012	2012 Olympic Games	(United Kingdom) London
2012 Yasar Dogu Tournament (gold) at 120 kg
Win	12–0	(Ukraine) Oleksandr Khotsianivskyi	5–2	13 Juny 2012	2012 Yasar Dogu	(Turkey) Ankara
Win	11–0	(Romania) Rareş Chintoan	7–0	12 Juny 2012	2012 Yasar Dogu	(Turkey) Ankara
Win	10–0	(Iran) Fardin Masoumi	10–0 Tech Fall	12 Juny 2012	2012 Yasar Dogu	(Turkey) Ankara
2012 European Championship (gold) at 120 kg
Win	9–0	(Hungary) Daniel Ligeti	9–1 Tech Fall	2 March 2012	2012 European Championship	(Serbia) Belgrade
Win	8–0	(Belarus) Ihar Dziatko	5–0	2 March 2012	2012 European Championship	(Serbia) Belgrade
Win	7–0	(Germany) Nick Matuhin	4–0	2 March 2012	2012 European Championship	(Serbia) Belgrade
Win	6–0	(Greece) Giagias Stamatios	9–0 Tech Fall	2 March 2012	2012 European Championship	(Serbia) Belgrade
2011 Golden Grand Prix (gold) at 125 kg
Win	5–0	(Turkey) Fatih Çakıroğlu	5–4	8 July 2011	2011 Golden Grand Prix	(Azerbaijan) Baku
Win	4–0	(Georgia (country)) Davit Modzmanashvili	8–3	7 July 2011	2011 Golden Grand Prix	(Azerbaijan) Baku
Win	3–0	(Azerbaijan) Jamaladdin Magomedov	7–3	7 July 2011	2011 Golden Grand Prix	(Azerbaijan) Baku
Win	2–0	(United States) Jarod Trice	8–2	7 July 2011	2011 Golden Grand Prix	(Azerbaijan) Baku
Win	1–0	(Spain) José Cuba	11–0 Tech Fall	7 July 2011	2011 Golden Grand Prix	(Azerbaijan) Baku

== See also ==
- Rıza Kayaalp
