= Wrestling at the 2015 European Games – Men's freestyle 125 kg =

Men's freestyle 125 kg at the 2015 European Games
- Venue: Heydar Aliyev Arena
- Date: 18 June
- Competitors: 21 from 21 nations

Medalists
gold medal	Taha Akgül	Turkey
silver medal	Aleksei Shemarov	Belarus
bronze medal	Geno Petriashvili	Georgia
bronze medal	Jamaladdin Magomedov	Azerbaijan

Men's freestyle 125 kg competition at the 2015 European Games in Baku, Azerbaijan, took place on 18 June at the Heydar Aliyev Arena.

== Schedule ==
All times are Azerbaijan Standard Time (UTC+04:00)

Date	Time	Event
Tuesday, 18 June 2015	11:00	1/8 finals
Tuesday, 18 June 2015	13:00	Quarterfinals
Tuesday, 18 June 2015	13:00	Semifinals
Tuesday, 18 June 2015	15:00	Repechage
Tuesday, 18 June 2015	19:00	Finals

== Results ==
Legend

- F — Won by fall

=== Final ===
Final
Aleksey Shemarov (BLR)	0
Taha Akgül (TUR)	6

=== Top half ===
Qualifications

1/8 finals
Chinu Xxx (GBR)	0
Oleksandr Khotsianivskyi (UKR)	10
Geno Petriashvili (GEO)	11
Boban Danov (MKD)	0
Khadzhimurat Gatsalov (RUS)	2
Levan Berianidze (ARM)	7
Nick Matuhin (GER)	4
Aleksey Shemarov (BLR)	9

Quarterfinals
Oleksandr Khotsianivskyi (UKR)	0
Geno Petriashvili (GEO)	10
Levan Berianidze (ARM)	0
Aleksey Shemarov (BLR)	5

Semifinals
Geno Petriashvili (GEO)	5
Aleksey Shemarov (BLR)	5

=== Bottom half ===
Qualifications
Jonas Rudavičius (LTU)	0
Jamaladdin Magomedov (AZE)	10
Dmitrijs Mihailovs (LAT)	0
Ioannis Arzoumanidis (GRE)	7
Dániel Ligeti (HUN)	5
Alexandr Romanov (MDA)	0
Soslan Gaglojev (SVK)	10
José Cuba (ESP)	0
Rareș Chintoan (ROU)	10
Egzon Shala (ALB)	0

1/8 finals
Robert Baran (POL)	6
Dimitar Kumchev (BUL)	0
Taha Akgül (TUR)	5
Jamaladdin Magomedov (AZE)	2
Ioannis Arzoumanidis (GRE)	0
Dániel Ligeti (HUN)	7
Soslan Gaglojev (SVK)	14
Rareș Chintoan (ROU)	3

Quarterfinals
Robert Baran (POL)	0
Taha Akgül (TUR)	5^{F}
Dániel Ligeti (HUN)	4
Soslan Gaglojev (SVK)	6

Semifinals
Taha Akgül (TUR)	6^{F}
Soslan Gaglojev (SVK)	0

=== Repechage ===
Repechage round 1
Nick Matuhin (GER)	3
Levan Berianidze (ARM)	3
Jamaladdin Magomedov (AZE)	11
Robert Baran (POL)	0

Bronze medal match
Levan Berianidze (ARM)	0
Geno Petriashvili (GEO)	5
Jamaladdin Magomedov (AZE)	7
Soslan Gaglojev (SVK)	2
