= 2013 European Wrestling Championships – Men's freestyle 120 kg =

Wrestling competition

The men's freestyle 120 kg is a competition featured at the 2013 European Wrestling Championships, and was held at the Tbilisi Sports Palace in Tbilisi, Georgia on 21 March 2013.

== Medalists ==
Gold	Taha Akgül; Turkey
Silver	Alen Zaseyev; Ukraine
Bronze	Jamaladdin Magomedov; Azerbaijan
Bronze	Geno Petriashvili; Georgia

== Results ==
Legend

- F — Won by fall

=== Main Draw ===
Round of 16
Robert Baran (POL)	0	1
Dániel Ligeti (HUN)	1	1
Jamaladdin Magomedov (AZE)	0	0
Taha Akgül (TUR)	2	2
Viktor Svetlitskin (GRE)	0	0
Dimitar Kumchev (BUL)	6	3
Andranik Galstyan (ARM)	0	0
Nick Matuhin (GER)	6	9
Alen Zasieiev (UKR)	2	4
Alexandr Romanov (MDA)	1	0
Geno Petriashvili (GEO)	1	4
Boban Danov (MKD)	0	0
Vadzim Shvedau (BLR)	0	0
Magomedgadzhi Nurasulov (RUS)	3	2

Quarterfinals
Igor Fiodorov (LTU)	0
Dániel Ligeti (HUN)	7^{F}
Taha Akgül (TUR)	2	3	3
Dimitar Kumchev (BUL)	2	0	1
Nick Matuhin (GER)	0	0
Alen Zasieiev (UKR)	1	2
Geno Petriashvili (GEO)	3	7^{F}
Magomedgadzhi Nurasulov (RUS)	2	0

Semifinals
Dániel Ligeti (HUN)	1	3
Taha Akgül (TUR)	5	5
Alen Zasieiev (UKR)	1	3
Geno Petriashvili (GEO)	0	0

Final
Taha Akgül (TUR)	0	1	2
Alen Zasieiev (UKR)	6	0	1

=== Repechage ===
Repechage round 1
Jamaladdin Magomedov (AZE)	2	4
Dimitar Kumchev (BUL)	0	0
Alexandr Romanov (MDA)	0	4	0
Nick Matuhin (GER)	6	1	5

Bronze medals
Jamaladdin Magomedov (AZE)	4	6
Daniel Ligeti (HUN)	0	1
Nick Matuhin (GER)	2	0
Geno Petriashvili (GEO)	4	5
