= 2013 Yasar Dogu Tournament =

Yasar Dogu 2013
- Host city: Ankara, Turkey
- Dates: February 09–10
- Stadium: Atatürk Sports Complex

The 41st Yasar Dogu Tournament 2013, was a wrestling event held in Ankara, Turkey between 09 and 10 February 2013.

This international tournament includes competition men's freestyle wrestling. This ranking tournament was held in honor of the two time Olympic Champion, Yaşar Doğu.

== Medal overview ==
=== Medal table ===
Rank	Nation	Gold	Silver	Bronze	Total
1	Georgia	3	0	1	4
2	Turkey	2	4	6	12
3	Azerbaijan	1	1	3	5
4	Russia	1	0	2	3
5	Mongolia	0	1	1	2
5	Uzbekistan	0	1	1	2
Totals (6 entries)		7	7	14	28

=== Men's freestyle ===
Event	Gold	Silver	Bronze
57 kg	(Russia) Aleksander Koryakin	(Turkey) Sezer Akgül	(Azerbaijan) Yashar Aliyev
57 kg	(Russia) Aleksander Koryakin	(Turkey) Sezer Akgül	(Georgia (country)) Giorgi Edisherashvili
60 kg	(Georgia (country)) Vladimir Khinchegashvili	(Mongolia) Enkhsaikhany Nyam-Ochir	(Azerbaijan) Haji Aliyev
60 kg	(Georgia (country)) Vladimir Khinchegashvili	(Mongolia) Enkhsaikhany Nyam-Ochir	(Russia) Andrey Bekrenev
66 kg	(Turkey) Yakup Gör	(Turkey) Muhammed İlkhan	(Turkey) Servet Coşkun
66 kg	(Turkey) Yakup Gör	(Turkey) Muhammed İlkhan	(Turkey) Mustafa Kaya
74 kg	(Azerbaijan) Aleksandr Gostiyev	(Turkey) Soner Demirtaş	(Uzbekistan) Rashid Kurbanov
74 kg	(Azerbaijan) Aleksandr Gostiyev	(Turkey) Soner Demirtaş	(Mongolia) Unurbat Purevjav
84 kg	(Georgia (country)) Dato Marsagishvili	(Turkey) Hakkı Ceylan	(Turkey) İbrahim Bölükbaşı
84 kg	(Georgia (country)) Dato Marsagishvili	(Turkey) Hakkı Ceylan	(Turkey) Serdar Böke
96 kg	(Georgia (country)) Elizbar Odikadze	(Azerbaijan) Khetag Gazyumov	(Russia) Evgeni Kolomiets
96 kg	(Georgia (country)) Elizbar Odikadze	(Azerbaijan) Khetag Gazyumov	(Turkey) Faruk Akkoyun
120 kg	(Turkey) Taha Akgül	(Uzbekistan) Kurban Kurbanov	(Azerbaijan) Jamaladdin Magomedov
120 kg	(Turkey) Taha Akgül	(Uzbekistan) Kurban Kurbanov	(Turkey) Yalçın Sözen

== Participating nations ==
- Azerbaijan
- Albania
- Canada
- Georgia
- Kazakhstan
- Kyrgyzstan
- Macedonia
- Mongolia
- Russia
- Slovakia
- Tajikistan
- Turkey
- Turkmenistan
- Uzbekistan

== See also ==
- 2020 Yasar Dogu Tournament
- 2019 Yasar Dogu Tournament
- 2018 Yasar Dogu Tournament
- 2017 Yasar Dogu Tournament
- 2016 Yasar Dogu Tournament
- 2015 Yasar Dogu Tournament
- 2014 Yasar Dogu Tournament
- 2012 Yasar Dogu Tournament
- 2011 Yasar Dogu Tournament
