= 2013 World Wrestling Championships – Men's freestyle 120 kg =

Men's freestyle 120 kg at the 2013 World Championships
- Venue: László Papp Budapest Sports Arena
- Dates: 17 September 2013
- Competitors: 29 from 29 nations

Medalists
gold medal	Khadzhimurat Gatsalov	Russia
silver medal	Alen Zaseyev	Ukraine
bronze medal	Geno Petriashvili	Georgia
bronze medal	Taha Akgül	Turkey

The men's freestyle 120 kilograms is a competition featured at the 2013 World Wrestling Championships, and was held at the László Papp Budapest Sports Arena in Budapest, Hungary on 17 September 2013.

This freestyle wrestling competition consists of a single-elimination tournament, with a repechage used to determine the winner of two bronze medals.

== Results ==
Legend

- C — Won by 3 cautions given to the opponent
- F — Won by fall
- R — Retired

=== Final ===
Final
Khadzhimurat Gatsalov (RUS)	7
Alen Zaseyev (UKR)	0

=== Top half ===
Round of 32
Rareș Chintoan (ROU)	3
Dimitar Kumchev (BUL)	0
Khadzhimurat Gatsalov (RUS)	3
Kurban Kurbanov (UZB)	2
Mohammed Sabah (IRQ)	2
Korey Jarvis (CAN)	3
Deng Zhiwei (CHN)	10
Nam Kyung-jin (KOR)	3
Edgardo López (PUR)	0
Dániel Ligeti (HUN)	3^{F}

Round of 16
Hitender Beniwal (IND)	0
Geno Petriashvili (GEO)	8
Yusup Jalilau (BLR)	7
Rareș Chintoan (ROU)	3^{C}
Khadzhimurat Gatsalov (RUS)	8
Korey Jarvis (CAN)	0
Deng Zhiwei (CHN)	7
Dániel Ligeti (HUN)	2

Quarterfinals
Geno Petriashvili (GEO)	7
Rareș Chintoan (ROU)	0
Khadzhimurat Gatsalov (RUS)	9
Deng Zhiwei (CHN)	2

Semifinals
Geno Petriashvili (GEO)	2
Khadzhimurat Gatsalov (RUS)	3^{F}

=== Bottom half ===
Round of 32
Andrei Romanov (MDA)	0
Jargalsaikhany Chuluunbat (MGL)	7
Jesse Ruíz (MEX)	2
Jamaladdin Magomedov (AZE)	10
Florian Skilang Temengil (PLW)	0
Alen Zaseyev (UKR)	9
Christos Nyfadopoulos (GRE)	0
Taha Akgül (TUR)	8
Nobuyoshi Arakida (JPN)	8
Luis Vivenes (VEN)	0
Tervel Dlagnev (USA)	9
Antoine Jaoude (BRA)	0
Johannes Kessel (GER)	0
Aiaal Lazarev (KGZ)	4
Daulet Shabanbay (KAZ)	2
Komeil Ghasemi (IRI)	6

Round of 16
Jargalsaikhany Chuluunbat (MGL)	3
Jamaladdin Magomedov (AZE)	4
Alen Zaseyev (UKR)	7
Taha Akgül (TUR)	0
Nobuyoshi Arakida (JPN)	0
Tervel Dlagnev (USA)	7
Aiaal Lazarev (KGZ)	1
Komeil Ghasemi (IRI)	4

Quarterfinals
Jamaladdin Magomedov (AZE)	0
Alen Zaseyev (UKR)	8
Tervel Dlagnev (USA)	7
Komeil Ghasemi (IRI)	0

Semifinals
Alen Zaseyev (UKR)	6
Tervel Dlagnev (USA)	2

=== Repechage ===
Repechage round 1
Kurban Kurbanov (UZB)	7
Korey Jarvis (CAN)	2
Florian Skilang Temengil (PLW)	0
Taha Akgül (TUR)	8

Repechage round 2
Kurban Kurbanov (UZB)	2
Deng Zhiwei (CHN)	3^{F}
Taha Akgül (TUR)	7
Jamaladdin Magomedov (AZE)	3^{R}

Bronze medals
Deng Zhiwei (CHN)	3
Geno Petriashvili (GEO)	10
Taha Akgül (TUR)	3
Tervel Dlagnev (USA)	0
