= Wrestling at the 2016 Summer Olympics – Men's freestyle 125 kg =

Men's freestyle 125 kg at the Games of the XXXI Olympiad
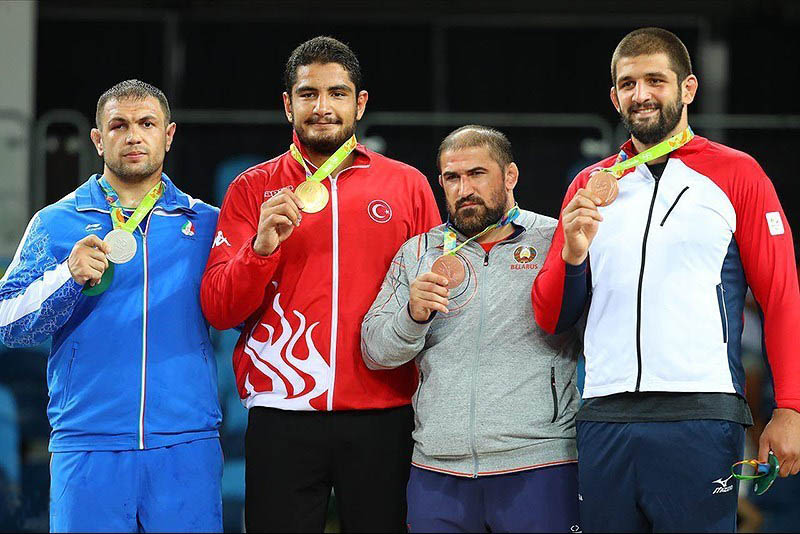
- Medalists
- Venue: Carioca Arena 2
- Date: 20 August 2016
- Competitors: 20 from 20 nations

Medalists
1st place, gold medalist(s)		Taha Akgül	Turkey
2nd place, silver medalist(s)		Komeil Ghasemi	Iran
3rd place, bronze medalist(s)		Ibrahim Saidau	Belarus
3rd place, bronze medalist(s)		Geno Petriashvili	Georgia

Men's freestyle 125 kilograms competition at the 2016 Summer Olympics in Rio de Janeiro, Brazil, took place on August 20 at the Carioca Arena 2 in Barra da Tijuca.

This freestyle wrestling competition consists of a single-elimination tournament, with a repechage used to determine the winner of two bronze medals. The two finalists face off for gold and silver medals. Each wrestler who loses to one of the two finalists moves into the repechage, culminating in a pair of bronze medal matches featuring the semifinal losers each facing the remaining repechage opponent from their half of the bracket.

Each bout consists of a single round within a six-minute limit. The wrestler who scores more points is the winner.

== Schedule ==
All times are Brasília Standard Time (UTC−03:00)

Date	Time	Event
20 August 2016	10:00	Qualification rounds
20 August 2016	16:00	Repechage
20 August 2016	17:00	Finals

== Results ==
=== Final ===
Final
Taha Akgül (TUR)	3
Komeil Ghasemi (IRI)	1

=== Top half ===
Qualifications

1/8 finals
Taha Akgül (TUR)	10
Jargalsaikhany Chuluunbat (MGL)	0
Ibrahim Saidau (BLR)	7
Daulet Shabanbay (KAZ)	0
Deng Zhiwei (CHN)	2
Levan Berianidze (ARM)	2
Florian Skilang Temengil (PLW)	0
Dániel Ligeti (HUN)	11

1/4 finals
Taha Akgül (TUR)	11
Ibrahim Saidau (BLR)	0
Levan Berianidze (ARM)	3
Dániel Ligeti (HUN)	1

Semifinals
Taha Akgül (TUR)	8
Levan Berianidze (ARM)	1

=== Bottom half ===
Qualifications
Alen Zaseyev (UKR)	2
Bilyal Makhov (RUS)	2
Geno Petriashvili (GEO)	10
Dimitar Kumchev (BUL)	0
Korey Jarvis (CAN)	2
Komeil Ghasemi (IRI)	5
Radhouane Chebbi (TUN)	0
Diaaeldin Kamal (EGY)	11

1/8 finals
Jamaladdin Magomedov (AZE)	5
Tervel Dlagnev (USA)	6
Robert Baran (POL)	5
Aiaal Lazarev (KGZ)	1
Alen Zaseyev (UKR)	6
Geno Petriashvili (GEO)	11
Komeil Ghasemi (IRI)	7
Diaaeldin Kamal (EGY)	0

1/4 finals
Tervel Dlagnev (USA)	3
Robert Baran (POL)	2
Geno Petriashvili (GEO)	4
Komeil Ghasemi (IRI)	4

Semifinals
Tervel Dlagnev (USA)	0
Komeil Ghasemi (IRI)	10

=== Repechage ===
Repechage round 1
Korey Jarvis (CAN)	7
Diaaeldin Kamal (EGY)	0

Repechage round 2
Jargalsaikhany Chuluunbat (MGL)	1
Ibrahim Saidau (BLR)	4
Korey Jarvis (CAN)	2
Geno Petriashvili (GEO)	9

Bronze medal bout
Ibrahim Saidau (BLR)	2
Levan Berianidze (ARM)	2
Geno Petriashvili (GEO)	10
Tervel Dlagnev (USA)	0

== Final standing ==
Rank	Athlete
1st place, gold medalist(s)	Taha Akgül (TUR)
2nd place, silver medalist(s)	Komeil Ghasemi (IRI)
3rd place, bronze medalist(s)	Ibrahim Saidau (BLR)
3rd place, bronze medalist(s)	Geno Petriashvili (GEO)
5	Levan Berianidze (ARM)
5	Tervel Dlagnev (USA)
7	Dániel Ligeti (HUN)
8	Korey Jarvis (CAN)
9	Diaaeldin Kamal (EGY)
10	Alen Zaseyev (UKR)
11	Robert Baran (POL)
12	Jamaladdin Magomedov (AZE)
13	Deng Zhiwei (CHN)
13	Bilyal Makhov (RUS)
15	Aiaal Lazarev (KGZ)
16	Jargalsaikhany Chuluunbat (MGL)
17	Daulet Shabanbay (KAZ)
18	Dimitar Kumchev (BUL)
19	Radhouane Chebbi (TUN)
19	Florian Skilang Temengil (PLW)
