= 2011 Yasar Dogu Tournament =

Yasar Dogu 2011
- Host city: Istanbul, Turkey
- Dates: February 11–13
- Stadium: Ahmet Comert Sports Complex

The 39th Yasar Dogu Tournament 2011 was a wrestling event held in Istanbul, Turkey between 11 and 13 February 2011.

This international tournament includes competition includes competition in both men's and women's freestyle wrestling. This ranking tournament was held in honor of the two time Olympic Champion, Yaşar Doğu.

== Medal overview ==
=== Medal table ===
Rank	Nation	Gold	Silver	Bronze	Total
1	Azerbaijan	4	1	3	8
2	Turkey	2	5	9	16
3	Sweden	2	1	0	3
4	Russia	1	3	4	8
5	Romania	1	2	1	4
6	Bulgaria	1	1	0	2
7	Armenia	1	0	1	2
8	Georgia	1	0	0	1
8	Latvia	1	0	0	1
10	Kyrgyzstan	0	1	0	1
11	Hungary	0	0	2	2
11	Poland	0	0	2	2
13	Estonia	0	0	1	1
13	Finland	0	0	1	1
13	Moldova	0	0	1	1
13	Mongolia	0	0	1	1
13	Slovakia	0	0	1	1
Totals (17 entries)		14	14	27	55

=== Men's freestyle ===
Event	Gold	Silver	Bronze
55 kg	(Georgia (country)) Vladimir Khinchegashvil	(Bulgaria) Radoslav Velikov	(Russia) Mikhail Osip
55 kg	(Georgia (country)) Vladimir Khinchegashvil	(Bulgaria) Radoslav Velikov	(Armenia) Mihran Jaburyan
60 kg	(Turkey) Hakkı Gürel	(Turkey) Münir Recep Aktaş	(Azerbaijan) Toghrul Asgarov
60 kg	(Turkey) Hakkı Gürel	(Turkey) Münir Recep Aktaş	(Mongolia) Batsaihan Nemehbayar
66 kg	(Azerbaijan) Zelimkhan Huseynov	(Russia) Dmitri Shadrin	(Russia) Azamat Bulatov
66 kg	(Azerbaijan) Zelimkhan Huseynov	(Russia) Dmitri Shadrin	(Turkey) Servet Coşkun
74 kg	(Armenia) Musa Murtazaliev	(Russia) Ruslan Valiev	(Slovakia) Kakhaber Khubezhty
74 kg	(Armenia) Musa Murtazaliev	(Russia) Ruslan Valiev	(Russia) Rasul Ravzev
84 kg	(Russia) Soslan Ktsoyev	(Turkey) İbrahim Bölükbaşı	(Turkey) Serdar Böke
84 kg	(Russia) Soslan Ktsoyev	(Turkey) İbrahim Bölükbaşı	(Azerbaijan) Novruz Temrezov
96 kg	(Azerbaijan) Khetag Gazyumov	(Turkey) Hamza Köseoğlu	(Russia) Ibrahim Saidau
96 kg	(Azerbaijan) Khetag Gazyumov	(Turkey) Hamza Köseoğlu	(Turkey) Mehmet Bölükbaşı
120 kg	(Turkey) Fatih Çakıroğlu	(Russia) Ruslan Basiev	(Turkey) Ali Rıza Kaya
120 kg	(Turkey) Fatih Çakıroğlu	(Russia) Ruslan Basiev	(Turkey) Taha Akgül

=== Women's freestyle ===
Event	Gold	Silver	Bronze
48 kg	(Azerbaijan) Mariya Stadnik	(Kyrgyzstan) Mikhrniso Nurmatova	(Turkey) Burcu Kebiç
48 kg	(Azerbaijan) Mariya Stadnik	(Kyrgyzstan) Mikhrniso Nurmatova	(Finland) Sarianne Savola
51 kg	(Romania) Estera Dobre	(Romania) Mihaela Munteanu	(Moldova) Natalia Budu
51 kg	(Romania) Estera Dobre	(Romania) Mihaela Munteanu	(Poland) Roksana Zasina
55 kg	(Sweden) Ida-Theres Karlsson-Nerell	(Romania) Ana Maria Pavăl	(Hungary) Emese Szabó
55 kg	(Sweden) Ida-Theres Karlsson-Nerell	(Romania) Ana Maria Pavăl	(Poland) Sylwia Bileńska
59 kg	(Latvia) Anastasija Grigorjeva	(Turkey) Hatun Muhcu	(Azerbaijan) Yuliya Ratkevich
59 kg	(Latvia) Anastasija Grigorjeva	(Turkey) Hatun Muhcu	(Turkey) Leyla Metin
63 kg	(Sweden) Henna Johansson	(Azerbaijan) Olesya Zamula	(Hungary) Marianna Sastin
63 kg	(Sweden) Henna Johansson	(Azerbaijan) Olesya Zamula	(Romania) Andrea Elena Simon
67 kg	(Azerbaijan) Nadeshda Mushka	(Turkey) Burcu Örskaya	(Turkey) Kıymet Koçyiğit
72 kg	(Bulgaria) Stanka Zlateva	(Sweden) Jenny Fransson	(Turkey) Simge Yılmaz
72 kg	(Bulgaria) Stanka Zlateva	(Sweden) Jenny Fransson	(Estonia) Epp Mäe

== Participating nations ==
- Turkey
- Azerbaijan
- Bulgaria
- Russia
- Moldova
- Georgia
- Armenia
- Mongolia
- Slovakia
- Estonia
- Latvia
- Finland
- Kyrgyzstan
- Romania
- Moldova
- Poland
- Sweden
- Hungary

== See also ==
- 2020 Yasar Dogu Tournament
- 2019 Yasar Dogu Tournament
- 2018 Yasar Dogu Tournament
- 2017 Yasar Dogu Tournament
- 2016 Yasar Dogu Tournament
- 2015 Yasar Dogu Tournament
- 2014 Yasar Dogu Tournament
- 2013 Yasar Dogu Tournament
- 2012 Yasar Dogu Tournament
