= 2016 European Wrestling Championships – Men's freestyle 125 kg =

The men's freestyle 125 kg is a competition featured at the 2016 European Wrestling Championships, and was held in Riga, Latvia on March 11.

== Medalists ==
Gold	Geno Petriashvili; Georgia
Silver	Robert Baran; Poland
Bronze	Alexey Nikoleav; Belarus
Bronze	Alen Zasieiev; Ukraine

== Results ==
Legend

- R — Retired
- F — Won by fall

=== Top half ===
==== Section 1 ====
Round of 16
Rares Chintoan (ROM)	10
Boban Danov (MKD)	0
Lyuben Borisov Iliev (BUL)	1
Robert Baran (POL)	5
Dmitrijs Mihailovs (LAT)	1
Andrei Romanov (MDA)	8
Alen Zasieiev (UKR)	4
Nick Matuhin (GER)	3
Jamaladdin Magomedov (AZE)	6
Vladislav Baitcaev (RUS)	3
Ioannis Arzoumanidis (GRE)	2
Daniel Ligeti (HUN)	3
Geno Petriashvili (GEO)	8
Taha Akgül (TUR)	8

Quarterfinals
Alexey Nikolaev (BLR)	14
Rares Chintoan (ROM)	4
Robert Baran (POL)	9
Andrei Romanov (MDA)	1
Alen Zasieiev (UKR)	6
Jamaladdin Magomedov (AZE)	2
Daniel Ligeti (HUN)	4
Geno Petriashvili (GEO)	14

Semifinals
Alexey Nikolaev (BLR)	2
Robert Baran (POL)	6
Alen Zasieiev (UKR)	6
Geno Petriashvili (GEO)	9

Finals
Robert Baran (POL)	0
Geno Petriashvili (GEO)	11

=== Repechage ===
Repechage round 2
Lyuben Borisov Iliev (BUL)	4
Andrei Romanov (MDA)	0
Taha Akgül (TUR)	0^{R}
Daniel Ligeti (HUN)	0

Bronze medals
Lyuben Borisov Iliev (BUL)	4
Alexey Nikolaev (BLR)	4
Daniel Ligeti (HUN)	6
Alen Zasieiev (UKR)	11
