= 2014 European Wrestling Championships – Men's freestyle 125 kg =

Wrestling competitions

The men's freestyle 125 kg is a competition featured at the 2014 European Wrestling Championships, and was held in Vantaa, Finland on April 3.

== Medalists ==
Gold	Taha Akgül; Turkey
Silver	Alan Khugaev; Russia
Bronze	Oleksandr Khotsianivskyi; Ukraine
Bronze	Dániel Ligeti; Hungary

== Results ==
Legend

- F — Won by fall

=== Main bracket ===
Round of 16
Soslan Gagloev (SVK)	6
Nick Matuhin (GER)	4
Ioannis Arzoumanidis (GRE)	1
Oleksandr Khotsianivskyi (UKR)	9^{F}
Andranik Galstyan (ARM)	0
Taha Akgül (TUR)	11
Jonas Rudavičius (LTU)	0
Vadzim Shvedau (BLR)	4
Rareș Chintoan (ROU)	0
Alan Khugaev (RUS)	11
Dániel Ligeti (HUN)	6
Boban Danov (MKD)	0
Dmitrijs Mihailovs (LAT)	0
Jamaladdin Magomedov (AZE)	10
Davit Modzmanashvili (GEO)	8
Andrei Romanov (MDA)	0

Quarterfinals
Soslan Gagloev (SVK)	2
Oleksandr Khotsianivskyi (UKR)	8^{F}
Taha Akgül (TUR)	10
Vadzim Shvedau (BLR)	0
Alan Khugaev (RUS)	11
Dániel Ligeti (HUN)	1
Jamaladdin Magomedov (AZE)	2
Davit Modzmanashvili (GEO)	5

Semifinals
Oleksandr Khotsianivskyi (UKR)	0
Taha Akgül (TUR)	10
Alan Khugaev (RUS)	3
Davit Modzmanashvili (GEO)	2

Final
Taha Akgül (TUR)	10
Alan Khugaev (RUS)	0

=== Repechage ===
Repechage round 1
Andranik Galstyan (ARM)	12
Vadzim Shvedau (BLR)	2
Rareș Chintoan (ROU)	8
Dániel Ligeti (HUN)	12

Bronze medals
Andranik Galstyan (ARM)	0
Oleksandr Khotsianivskyi (UKR)	11
Dániel Ligeti (HUN)	5
Davit Modzmanashvili (GEO)	2
