= 2015 World Wrestling Championships – Men's freestyle 125 kg =

Men's freestyle 125 kg at the 2015 World Championships
- Venue: Orleans Arena
- Dates: 12 September 2015
- Competitors: 32 from 32 nations

Medalists
gold medal	Taha Akgül	Turkey
silver medal	Jamaladdin Magomedov	Azerbaijan
bronze medal	Geno Petriashvili	Georgia
bronze medal	Levan Berianidze	Armenia

The men's freestyle 125 kilograms is a competition featured at the 2015 World Wrestling Championships, and was held in Las Vegas, United States on 12 September 2015.

This freestyle wrestling competition consisted of a single-elimination tournament, with a repechage used to determine the winners of two bronze medals.

== Results ==
Legend

- F — Won by fall
- R — Retired
- WO — Won by walkover

=== Final ===
Final
Jamaladdin Magomedov (AZE)	0
Taha Akgül (TUR)	10

=== Top half ===
Round of 32
Korey Jarvis (CAN)	0
Geno Petriashvili (GEO)	10
Zach Rey (USA)	1
Alen Zaseyev (UKR)	6
Dániel Ligeti (HUN)	3
Deng Zhiwei (CHN)	2
Sumit Malik (IND)	0
Aiaal Lazarev (KGZ)	3
Jargalsaikhany Chuluunbat (MGL)	5
Ioannis Arzoumanidis (GRE)	1
Florian Skilang Temengil (PLW)	4
Diaaeldin Kamal (EGY)	9
Jamaladdin Magomedov (AZE)	10
Mohammed Sabah (IRQ)	0
Nobuyoshi Arakida (JPN)	10
Hugo Cunha (BRA)	0

Round of 16
Geno Petriashvili (GEO)	16
Alen Zaseyev (UKR)	8
Dániel Ligeti (HUN)	8
Aiaal Lazarev (KGZ)	11
Jargalsaikhany Chuluunbat (MGL)	5^{F}
Diaaeldin Kamal (EGY)	0
Jamaladdin Magomedov (AZE)	11
Nobuyoshi Arakida (JPN)	0

Quarterfinals
Geno Petriashvili (GEO)	16
Aiaal Lazarev (KGZ)	12
Jargalsaikhany Chuluunbat (MGL)	1
Jamaladdin Magomedov (AZE)	3^{F}

Semifinals
Geno Petriashvili (GEO)	0
Jamaladdin Magomedov (AZE)	10

=== Bottom half ===
Round of 32
Aleksey Shemarov (BLR)
Parviz Hadi (IRI)	WO
Soslan Gaglojev (SVK)	10
Farkhod Anakulov (TJK)	0
Luis Vivenes (VEN)	9
Boban Danov (MKD)	1
Bilyal Makhov (RUS)	12
Rareș Chintoan (ROU)	2
Daulet Shabanbay (KAZ)	12
Edgardo López (PUR)	1
Kim Dong-hwan (KOR)	5
Andrei Romanov (MDA)	1
Levan Berianidze (ARM)	8
Nick Matuhin (GER)	2
José Cuba (ESP)	0
Taha Akgül (TUR)	11

Round of 16
Parviz Hadi (IRI)	10
Soslan Gaglojev (SVK)	0
Luis Vivenes (VEN)	1
Bilyal Makhov (RUS)	11^{F}
Daulet Shabanbay (KAZ)	4^{F}
Kim Dong-hwan (KOR)	0
Levan Berianidze (ARM)	2
Taha Akgül (TUR)	4

Quarterfinals
Parviz Hadi (IRI)	2
Bilyal Makhov (RUS)	11
Daulet Shabanbay (KAZ)	1
Taha Akgül (TUR)	6

Semifinals
Bilyal Makhov (RUS)	0
Taha Akgül (TUR)	10

=== Repechage ===
Repechage round 1
Mohammed Sabah (IRQ)	0^{R}
Nobuyoshi Arakida (JPN)	4
José Cuba (ESP)	0
Levan Berianidze (ARM)	11

Repechage round 2
Nobuyoshi Arakida (JPN)	1
Jargalsaikhany Chuluunbat (MGL)	2
Levan Berianidze (ARM)	3
Daulet Shabanbay (KAZ)	2

Bronze medals
Jargalsaikhany Chuluunbat (MGL)	0
Geno Petriashvili (GEO)	11
Levan Berianidze (ARM)	0
Bilyal Makhov (RUS)	11

- Bilyal Makhov of Russia originally won the bronze medal but was disqualified in 2025 due to doping offenses.
