= 2023 European Wrestling Championships – Men's freestyle 125 kg =

Wrestling competition

Men's freestyle 125 kg at the 2023 European Wrestling Championships
- Venue: Arena Zagreb
- Location: Zagreb, Croatia
- Dates: 18-19 April
- Competitors: 14

Medalists
gold medal	Taha Akgül	Turkey
silver medal	Geno Petriashvili	Georgia
bronze medal	Giorgi Meshvildishvili	Azerbaijan
bronze medal	Dániel Ligeti	Hungary

The Men's Freestyle 125 kg is a competition featured at the 2023 European Wrestling Championships, and was held in Zagreb, Croatia on April 18 and 19.

== Results ==
Legend

- F — Won by fall

Round of 16
Giorgi Meshvildishvili (AZE)	5^{F}
Gennadij Cudinovic (GER)	0
Paris Karepi (ALB)	0
Abraham Conyedo (ITA)	3
Robert Baran (POL)	0
Oleksandr Khotsianivskyi (UKR)	6
Dániel Ligeti (HUN)	4
Johannes Ludescher (AUT)	2
Georgi Ivanov (BUL)	8
Alexander Romanov (MDA)	1
Magomedgadzhi Nurasulov (SRB)	1
Azamat Khosonov (GRE)	2

Quarterfinals
Taha Akgül (TUR)	3
Giorgi Meshvildishvili (AZE)	1
Abraham Conyedo (ITA)	4
Oleksandr Khotsianivskyi (UKR)	2
Dániel Ligeti (HUN)	8
Georgi Ivanov (BUL)	1
Azamat Khosonov (GRE)	2
Geno Petriashvili (GEO)	12

Semifinals
Taha Akgül (TUR)	4
Abraham Conyedo (ITA)	0
Dániel Ligeti (HUN)	4
Geno Petriashvili (GEO)	7

Final
Taha Akgül (TUR)	9
Geno Petriashvili (GEO)	4

Bronze medal match
Giorgi Meshvildishvili (AZE)	7
Abraham Conyedo (ITA)	4
Azamat Khosonov (GRE)	2
Dániel Ligeti (HUN)	6

== Final standing ==
Rank	Athlete
1st place, gold medalist(s)	Taha Akgül (TUR)
2nd place, silver medalist(s)	Geno Petriashvili (GEO)
3rd place, bronze medalist(s)	Giorgi Meshvildishvili (AZE)
3rd place, bronze medalist(s)	Dániel Ligeti (HUN)
5	Abraham Conyedo (ITA)
5	Azamat Khosonov (GRE)
7	Georgi Ivanov (BUL)
8	Oleksandr Khotsianivskyi (UKR)
9	Johannes Ludescher (AUT)
10	Magomedgadzhi Nurasulov (SRB)
11	Alexander Romanov (MDA)
12	Paris Karepi (ALB)
13	Gennadij Cudinovic (GER)
14	Robert Baran (POL)
