= 2019 European Wrestling Championships – Men's freestyle 125 kg =

The men's freestyle 125 kg is a competition featured at the 2019 European Wrestling Championships, and was held in Bucharest, Romania on April 9 and April 10.

== Medalists ==
Gold	Taha Akgül; Turkey
Silver	Geno Petriashvili; Georgia
Bronze	Anzor Khizriev; Russia
Bronze	Oleksandr Khotsianivskyi; Ukraine

== Results ==
Legend

- F — Won by fall

=== Final ===
Final
Taha Akgül (TUR)	7
Geno Petriashvili (GEO)	0

=== Top half ===
Round of 32

Round of 16
Rareș Chintoan (ROU)	1
Taha Akgül (TUR)	7
Dmitrijs Mihailovs (LAT)	0
Andranik Galstyan (ARM)	10
Johannes Ludescher (AUT)	4
Vitali Piasniak (BLR)	1
Şamhan Jabrailov (MDA)	5
Anzor Khizriev (RUS)	8

Quarterfinals
Taha Akgül (TUR)	11
Andranik Galstyan (ARM)	0
Johannes Ludescher (AUT)	1
Anzor Khizriev (RUS)	8

Semifinals
Taha Akgül (TUR)	8
Anzor Khizriev (RUS)	1

=== Bottom half ===
Round of 32
Egzon Shala (KOS)	13^{F}
Mohammad Reza Azarshakib (AZE)	9

Round of 16
Dániel Ligeti (HUN)	4
Geno Petriashvili (GEO)	7
Jere Heino (FIN)	4
Robert Baran (POL)	6
Oleksandr Khotsianivskyi (UKR)	10
Ioannis Kargiotakis (GRE)	0
Nick Matuhin (GER)	10
Egzon Shala (KOS)	0

Quarterfinals
Geno Petriashvili (GEO)	10
Robert Baran (POL)	2
Oleksandr Khotsianivskyi (UKR)	5
Nick Matuhin (GER)	1

Semifinals
Geno Petriashvili (GEO)	3
Oleksandr Khotsianivskyi (UKR)	2

=== Repechage ===
Repechage round 1
Rareș Chintoan (ROU)	4^{F}
Andranik Galstyan (ARM)	6
Dániel Ligeti (HUN)	3
Robert Baran (POL)	3

Bronze medal match
Rareș Chintoan (ROU)	0
Anzor Khizriev (RUS)	11
Robert Baran (POL)	2
Oleksandr Khotsianivskyi (UKR)	3
