= 2012 Yasar Dogu Tournament =

Turkish wrestling tournament

Yasar Dogu 2012
- Host city: Ankara, Turkey
- Dates: February 10–12
- Stadium: Atatürk Sports Complex

The 40th Yasar Dogu Tournament 2012, was a wrestling event held in Ankara, Turkey between 10 and 12 February 2012.

This international tournament includes competition includes competition in both men's and women's freestyle wrestling. This ranking tournament was held in honor of the two time Olympic Champion, Yaşar Doğu.

== Medal overview ==
=== Medal table ===
Rank	Nation	Gold	Silver	Bronze	Total
1	Turkey	6	8	9	23
2	Azerbaijan	3	4	4	11
3	Iran	1	1	4	6
4	Romania	1	0	1	2
4	Russia	1	0	1	2
6	Bulgaria	1	0	0	1
6	Canada	1	0	0	1
8	Great Britain	0	1	0	1
9	Kazakhstan	0	0	2	2
10	Moldova	0	0	1	1
10	Mongolia	0	0	1	1
10	United States	0	0	1	1
Totals (12 entries)		14	14	24	52

=== Men's freestyle ===
Event	Gold	Silver	Bronze
55 kg	(Azerbaijan) Makhmud Magomedov	(Turkey) Vedat Bulduk	(Azerbaijan) Garib Aliev
55 kg	(Azerbaijan) Makhmud Magomedov	(Turkey) Vedat Bulduk	(Kazakhstan) Kaiyrzhan Beisebaev
60 kg	(Russia) Aleksandr Bogomoev	(Turkey) Recep Aktaş	(Iran) Morad Mohammadi
60 kg	(Russia) Aleksandr Bogomoev	(Turkey) Recep Aktaş	(Russia) Ayal Anisimov
66 kg	(Turkey) Mustafa Kaya	(Turkey) Yakup Gör	(Iran) Meisam Nassiri
66 kg	(Turkey) Mustafa Kaya	(Turkey) Yakup Gör	(Azerbaijan) Jabrayil Hasanov
74 kg	(Canada) Matt Gentry	(Turkey) Soner Demirtaş	(Turkey) Ayhan Sucu
74 kg	(Canada) Matt Gentry	(Turkey) Soner Demirtaş	(Azerbaijan) Ashraf Aliyev
84 kg	(Iran) Jamal Mirzaei	(Turkey) Serdar Böke	(Kazakhstan) Ermek Baiduashev
84 kg	(Iran) Jamal Mirzaei	(Turkey) Serdar Böke	(Iran) Meisam Mostafa-Jokar
96 kg	(Azerbaijan) Khetag Gazyumov	(Azerbaijan) Sharif Sharifov	(United States) James Bergman
96 kg	(Azerbaijan) Khetag Gazyumov	(Azerbaijan) Sharif Sharifov	(Turkey) Faruk Akkoyun
120 kg	(Turkey) Taha Akgül	(Iran) Fardin Masoumi	(Iran) Jaber Sadeghzadeh
120 kg	(Turkey) Taha Akgül	(Iran) Fardin Masoumi	(Turkey) Ali Gürbüz

=== Women's freestyle ===
Event	Gold	Silver	Bronze
48 kg	(Azerbaijan) Marziget Bagomedova	(Azerbaijan) Kamala Aliyeva	(Turkey) Sümeyye Zeybek Sezer
48 kg	(Azerbaijan) Marziget Bagomedova	(Azerbaijan) Kamala Aliyeva	(Turkey) Merve Kenger
51 kg	(Romania) Natalia Budu	(Turkey) Burcu Kebiç	(Moldova) Elena Turcan
51 kg	(Romania) Natalia Budu	(Turkey) Burcu Kebiç	(Azerbaijan) Anzhela Dorogan
55 kg	(Turkey) Zeynep Yıldırım	(Turkey) Bediha Gün	(Turkey) YangülKarakuş
55 kg	(Turkey) Zeynep Yıldırım	(Turkey) Bediha Gün	(Mongolia) Pürevdorjiin Orkhon
59 kg	(Turkey) Hafize Şahin	(Turkey) Derya Yılmaz	(Turkey) Hatun Muhcu
59 kg	(Turkey) Hafize Şahin	(Turkey) Derya Yılmaz	(Romania) Mariana Cherdivara
63 kg	(Turkey) Elif Jale Yeşilırmak	(Azerbaijan) Irina Netreba	(Turkey) Sinem Topçu
67 kg	(Turkey) Neslihan Ulusoy	(United Kingdom) Chloe Spiteri	Not awarded
72 kg	(Bulgaria) Stanka Zlateva	(Azerbaijan) Natalya Palamarchuk	(Turkey) Yasemin Adar

== Participating nations ==
- Azerbaijan
- Bulgaria
- Canada
- Iran
- Japan
- Georgia
- Germany
- Kazakhstan
- Kyrgyzstan
- Lithuania
- Macedonia
- Moldova
- Poland
- Russia
- Slovakia
- South Africa
- Turkey
- United States
- Uzbekistan

== See also ==
- 2020 Yasar Dogu Tournament
- 2019 Yasar Dogu Tournament
- 2018 Yasar Dogu Tournament
- 2017 Yasar Dogu Tournament
- 2016 Yasar Dogu Tournament
- 2015 Yasar Dogu Tournament
- 2014 Yasar Dogu Tournament
- 2013 Yasar Dogu Tournament
- 2011 Yasar Dogu Tournament
