= 2024 European Wrestling Championships – Men's freestyle 125 kg =

Wrestling competition

Men's freestyle 125 kg at the 2024 European Wrestling Championships
- Venue: Polyvalent Hall
- Location: Bucharest, Romania
- Dates: 17-18 February
- Competitors: 16

Medalists
gold medal	Taha Akgül	Turkey
silver medal	Geno Petriashvili	Georgia
bronze medal	Alen Khubulov	Bulgaria
bronze medal	Giorgi Meshvildishvili	Azerbaijan

The men's freestyle 125 kg was a competition featured at the 2024 European Wrestling Championships, held in Bucharest, Romania on February 17 and 18.

== Results ==
Legend

- F — Won by fall

Round of 16
Geno Petriashvili (GEO)	9
Johannes Ludescher (AUT)	0
Alen Khubulov (BUL)	10
Gheorghe Erhan (MDA)	1
Michael Manea (ROU)	0
Alikhan Zhabrailov (AIN)	10
Magomedgadzhi Nurasulov (SRB)	5
Dzianis Khramiankou (AIN)	16
Giorgi Meshvildishvili (AZE)	5
Lyova Gevorgyan (ARM)	0
Azamat Khosonov (GRE)	10
Gennadij Cudinovic (GER)	1
Abraham Conyedo (ITA)	0
Murazi Mchedlidze (UKR)	4
Kamil Kościółek (POL)	0
Taha Akgül (TUR)	10

Quarterfinals
Geno Petriashvili (GEO)	10
Alen Khubulov (BUL)	4
Alikhan Zhabrailov (AIN)	3
Dzianis Khramiankou (AIN)	4
Giorgi Meshvildishvili (AZE)	5
Azamat Khosonov (GRE)	4
Murazi Mchedlidze (UKR)	0
Taha Akgül (TUR)	10

Semifinals
Geno Petriashvili (GEO)	10
Dzianis Khramiankou (AIN)	0
Giorgi Meshvildishvili (AZE)	0
Taha Akgül (TUR)	10

Final
Geno Petriashvili (GEO)	4
Taha Akgül (TUR)	5

=== Repechage ===
Repechage round 1
Johannes Ludescher (AUT)	0
Alen Khubulov (BUL)	10
Kamil Kościółek (POL)	3
Murazi Mchedlidze (UKR)	4

Bronze medal match
Alen Khubulov (BUL)	3
Dzianis Khramiankou (AIN)	0
Murazi Mchedlidze (UKR)	0
Giorgi Meshvildishvili (AZE)	10

== Final standing ==
Rank	Athlete
1st place, gold medalist(s)	Taha Akgül (TUR)
2nd place, silver medalist(s)	Geno Petriashvili (GEO)
3rd place, bronze medalist(s)	Alen Khubulov (BUL)
3rd place, bronze medalist(s)	Giorgi Meshvildishvili (AZE)
5	Dzianis Khramiankou (AIN)
5	Murazi Mchedlidze (UKR)
7	Alikhan Zhabrailov (AIN)
8	Azamat Khosonov (GRE)
9	Magomedgadzhi Nurasulov (SRB)
10	Kamil Kościółek (POL)
11	Gheorghe Erhan (MDA)
12	Gennadij Cudinovic (GER)
13	Abraham Conyedo (ITA)
14	Lyova Gevorgyan (ARM)
15	Michael Manea (ROU)
16	Johannes Ludescher (AUT)
