= 2014 World Wrestling Championships – Men's freestyle 125 kg =

Men's freestyle 125 kg at the 2014 World Championships
- Venue: Gymnastics Sport Palace
- Dates: 8 September 2014
- Competitors: 26 from 26 nations

Medalists
gold medal	Taha Akgül	Turkey
silver medal	Komeil Ghasemi	Iran
bronze medal	Khadzhimurat Gatsalov	Russia
bronze medal	Tervel Dlagnev	United States

The men's freestyle 125 kilograms is a competition featured at the 2014 World Wrestling Championships, and was held in Tashkent, Uzbekistan on 8 September 2014.

This freestyle wrestling competition consisted of a single-elimination tournament, with a repechage used to determine the winners of two bronze medals.

== Results ==
Legend

- F — Won by fall

=== Final ===
Final
Komeil Ghasemi (IRI)	3
Taha Akgül (TUR)	4

=== Top half ===
Round of 32
Tomoyuki Oka (JPN)	1
Deng Zhiwei (CHN)	7
Komeil Ghasemi (IRI)	4
Oleksandr Khotsianivskyi (UKR)	0

Round of 16
Nick Matuhin (GER)	6^{F}
Yerzhan Duissenbekov (KAZ)	0
Khadzhimurat Gatsalov (RUS)	8
José Cuba (ESP)	0
Kamil Skaskiewicz (POL)	0
Kurban Kurbanov (UZB)	3
Deng Zhiwei (CHN)	2
Komeil Ghasemi (IRI)	7

Quarterfinals
Nick Matuhin (GER)	0
Khadzhimurat Gatsalov (RUS)	11
Kurban Kurbanov (UZB)	0
Komeil Ghasemi (IRI)	7

Semifinals
Khadzhimurat Gatsalov (RUS)	4
Komeil Ghasemi (IRI)	5

=== Bottom half ===
Round of 32
Aslan Dzebisov (AZE)	4
Aiaal Lazarev (KGZ)	1
Taha Akgül (TUR)	10
Richárd Csercsics (HUN)	4
Soslan Gaglojev (SVK)	8
Korey Jarvis (CAN)	1
Andrei Romanov (MDA)	1
Tervel Dlagnev (USA)	11
Sung Ryong (KOR)	2
Rajiv Tomar (IND)	2
Giorgi Sakandelidze (GEO)	0
Aleksey Shemarov (BLR)	4
Boban Danov (MKD)	6
Dmitrijs Mihailovs (LAT)	0
Luis Vivenes (VEN)	0
Jargalsaikhany Chuluunbat (MGL)	10

Round of 16
Aslan Dzebisov (AZE)	0
Taha Akgül (TUR)	4
Soslan Gaglojev (SVK)	0
Tervel Dlagnev (USA)	5
Sung Ryong (KOR)	0
Aleksey Shemarov (BLR)	10
Boban Danov (MKD)	0
Jargalsaikhany Chuluunbat (MGL)	10

Quarterfinals
Taha Akgül (TUR)	4
Tervel Dlagnev (USA)	2
Aleksey Shemarov (BLR)	6
Jargalsaikhany Chuluunbat (MGL)	0

Semifinals
Taha Akgül (TUR)	8
Aleksey Shemarov (BLR)	1

=== Repechage ===
Repechage round 1
Oleksandr Khotsianivskyi (UKR)	10
Deng Zhiwei (CHN)	0
Richárd Csercsics (HUN)	2
Aslan Dzebisov (AZE)	6

Repechage round 2
Oleksandr Khotsianivskyi (UKR)	9
Kurban Kurbanov (UZB)	0
Aslan Dzebisov (AZE)	1
Tervel Dlagnev (USA)	3

Bronze medals
Oleksandr Khotsianivskyi (UKR)	0
Khadzhimurat Gatsalov (RUS)	2^{F}
Tervel Dlagnev (USA)	2
Aleksey Shemarov (BLR)	1
