= 2022 European Wrestling Championships – Men's freestyle 125 kg =

Wrestling competition

Men's freestyle 125 kg at the 2022 European Wrestling Championships
- Venue: BOK Sports Hall
- Location: Budapest, Hungary
- Dates: 29-30 March
- Competitors: 12

Medalists
gold medal	Taha Akgül	Turkey
silver medal	Geno Petriashvili	Georgia
bronze medal	Dániel Ligeti	Hungary
bronze medal	Robert Baran	Poland

The men's freestyle 125 kg was a competition featured at the 2022 European Wrestling Championships, and was held in Budapest, Hungary on March 29 and 30.

== Results ==
Legend

- F — Won by fall

=== Main Bracket ===
Round of 16
Abraham Conyedo (ITA)	3
Jere Heino (FIN)	2
Aydin Ahmadov (AZE)	5
Paris Karepi (ALB)	0
Gabriel Tysz (SVK)	0
Dániel Ligeti (HUN)	5^{F}
Johannes Ludescher (AUT)	2
Magomedgadzhi Nurasulov (SRB)	7

Quarterfinals
Geno Petriashvili (GEO)	11
Abraham Conyedo (ITA)	0
Aydin Ahmadov (AZE)	0
Robert Baran (POL)	11
Gennadij Cudinovic (GER)	0
Dániel Ligeti (HUN)	7
Magomedgadzhi Nurasulov (SRB)	0
Taha Akgül (TUR)	5

Semifinals
Geno Petriashvili (GEO)	2
Robert Baran (POL)	1
Dániel Ligeti (HUN)	0
Taha Akgül (TUR)	10

Final
Geno Petriashvili (GEO)	2
Taha Akgül (TUR)	5

=== Repechage ===
Bronze medal match
Abraham Conyedo (ITA)	2
Robert Baran (POL)	3
Magomedgadzhi Nurasulov (SRB)	4
Dániel Ligeti (HUN)	6

== Final standing ==
Rank	Wrestler	UWW Points
1st place, gold medalist(s)	Taha Akgül (TUR)	10000
2nd place, silver medalist(s)	Geno Petriashvili (GEO)	8000
3rd place, bronze medalist(s)	Robert Baran (POL)	6500
3rd place, bronze medalist(s)	Dániel Ligeti (HUN)	6500
5	Abraham Conyedo (ITA)	5000
5	Magomedgadzhi Nurasulov (SRB)	5000
7	Aydin Ahmadov (AZE)	4400
8	Jere Heino (FIN)	4000
9	Johannes Ludescher (AUT)	3500
10	Paris Karepi (ALB)	3100
11	Gabriel Tysz (SVK)	1000
12	Gennadij Cudinovic (GER)	800
