= 2022 World Wrestling Championships – Men's freestyle 125 kg =

Wrestling competitions

Men's freestyle 125 kg at the 2022 World Championships
- Venue: Štark Arena
- Dates: 15–16 September 2022
- Competitors: 24 from 24 nations

Medalists
gold medal	Taha Akgül	Turkey
silver medal	Mönkhtöriin Lkhagvagerel	Mongolia
bronze medal	Geno Petriashvili	Georgia
bronze medal	Amir Hossein Zare	Iran

The men's freestyle 125 kilograms is a competition featured at the 2022 World Wrestling Championships, and was held in Belgrade, Serbia on 15 and 16 September 2022.

This freestyle wrestling competition consists of a single-elimination tournament, with a repechage used to determine the winner of two bronze medals. The two finalists face off for gold and silver medals. Each wrestler who loses to one of the two finalists moves into the repechage, culminating in a pair of bronze medal matches featuring the semifinal losers each facing the remaining repechage opponent from their half of the bracket.

== Results ==
Legend

- F — Won by fall
- WO — Won by walkover

=== Final ===
Final
Mönkhtöriin Lkhagvagerel (MGL)	2
Taha Akgül (TUR)	6

=== Top half ===
Round of 32
Catriel Muriel (ARG)	4
Dinesh Dhankhar (IND)	11
Zyýamuhammet Saparow (TKM)	4
Hayden Zillmer (USA)	15
Jere Heino (FIN)	6
Abdullah Karim (SYR)	0
Magomedgadzhi Nurasulov (SRB)	8
Khasanboy Rakhimov (UZB)	10

Round of 16
Geno Petriashvili (GEO)	4^{F}
Dinesh Dhankhar (IND)	0
Hayden Zillmer (USA)	3
Robert Baran (POL)	2
Oleg Boltin (KAZ)	6
Jere Heino (FIN)	0
Khasanboy Rakhimov (UZB)
Mönkhtöriin Lkhagvagerel (MGL)	WO

Quarterfinals
Geno Petriashvili (GEO)	9
Hayden Zillmer (USA)	4
Oleg Boltin (KAZ)	2
Mönkhtöriin Lkhagvagerel (MGL)	4

Semifinals
Geno Petriashvili (GEO)	2
Mönkhtöriin Lkhagvagerel (MGL)	4

=== Bottom half ===
Round of 32
Deng Zhiwei (CHN)	5
Aydin Ahmadov (AZE)	0
Jung Yei-hyun (KOR)	0
Oleksandr Khotsianivskyi (UKR)	10
Reineris Salas (CUB)	2
Amar Dhesi (CAN)	4
Dániel Ligeti (HUN)	7
Taiki Yamamoto (JPN)	0

Round of 16
Amir Hossein Zare (IRI)	3
Deng Zhiwei (CHN)	0
Oleksandr Khotsianivskyi (UKR)	11
Gennadij Cudinovic (GER)	2
Youssif Hemida (EGY)	1
Amar Dhesi (CAN)	12
Dániel Ligeti (HUN)	0
Taha Akgül (TUR)	4

Quarterfinals
Amir Hossein Zare (IRI)	10
Oleksandr Khotsianivskyi (UKR)	0
Amar Dhesi (CAN)	2
Taha Akgül (TUR)	8

Semifinals
Amir Hossein Zare (IRI)	2
Taha Akgül (TUR)	4

=== Repechage ===
Repechage round 2
Khasanboy Rakhimov (UZB)
Oleg Boltin (KAZ)	WO
Dániel Ligeti (HUN)	4
Amar Dhesi (CAN)	5

Bronze medals
Oleg Boltin (KAZ)	4
Geno Petriashvili (GEO)	11
Amar Dhesi (CAN)	0
Amir Hossein Zare (IRI)	8

== Final standing ==
Rank	Athlete
1st place, gold medalist(s)	Taha Akgül (TUR)
2nd place, silver medalist(s)	Mönkhtöriin Lkhagvagerel (MGL)
3rd place, bronze medalist(s)	Geno Petriashvili (GEO)
3rd place, bronze medalist(s)	Amir Hossein Zare (IRI)
5	Oleg Boltin (KAZ)
5	Amar Dhesi (CAN)
7	Hayden Zillmer (USA)
8	Oleksandr Khotsianivskyi (UKR)
9	Dániel Ligeti (HUN)
10	Dinesh Dhankhar (IND)
11	Khasanboy Rakhimov (UZB)
12	Jere Heino (FIN)
13	Deng Zhiwei (CHN)
14	Magomedgadzhi Nurasulov (SRB)
15	Catriel Muriel (ARG)
16	Zyýamuhammet Saparow (TKM)
17	Robert Baran (POL)
18	Reineris Salas (CUB)
19	Gennadij Cudinovic (GER)
20	Youssif Hemida (EGY)
21	Aydin Ahmadov (AZE)
22	Abdullah Karim (SYR)
23	Taiki Yamamoto (JPN)
24	Jung Yei-hyun (KOR)
