= 2018 European Wrestling Championships – Men's freestyle 125 kg =

The men's freestyle 125 kg is a competition featured at the 2018 European Wrestling Championships, is scheduled to be held in Kaspiysk, Russia on May 5 and May 6.

== Medalists ==
Gold	Taha Akgül (TUR)
Silver	Geno Petriashvili (GEO)
Bronze	Robert Baran (POL)
Bronze	Jamaladdin Magomedov (AZE)

== Results ==
Legend

- F — Won by fall

=== Main Bracket ===
Round of 16
Taha Akgül (TUR)	5
Ibrahim Saidau (BLR)	0
Muradin Kushkhov (RUS)	10
Alexandr Romanov (MDA)	0
Danylo Kartavyi (UKR)	10
Jere Heino (FIN)	0

Quarterfinals
José Cuba (ESP)	4
Robert Baran (POL)	11
Geno Petriashvili (GEO)	11
Johannes Ludescher (AUT)	0
Jamaladdin Magomedov (AZE)	2
Taha Akgül (TUR)	4
Muradin Kushkhov (RUS)	5
Danylo Kartavyi (UKR)	3

Semifinals
Robert Baran (POL)	0
Geno Petriashvili (GEO)	10
Taha Akgül (TUR)	3
Muradin Kushkhov (RUS)	0

Final
Geno Petriashvili (GEO)	1
Taha Akgül (TUR)	2

=== Repechage ===
Repechage round 1
Ibrahim Saidau (BLR)	2
Jamaladdin Magomedov (AZE)	3

Bronze medal match
Johannes Ludescher (AUT)	1
Robert Baran (POL)	6
Jamaladdin Magomedov (AZE)	3
Muradin Kushkhov (RUS)	0
