= Wrestling at the 2020 Summer Olympics – Men's freestyle 125 kg =

Men's freestyle 125 kg at the Games of the XXXII Olympiad
- Venue: Makuhari Messe
- Date: 5–6 August 2021
- Competitors: 16 from 16 nations

Medalists
1st place, gold medalist(s)		Gable Steveson	United States
2nd place, silver medalist(s)		Geno Petriashvili	Georgia
3rd place, bronze medalist(s)		Amir Hossein Zare	Iran
3rd place, bronze medalist(s)		Taha Akgül	Turkey

The men's freestyle 125 kilograms competition at the 2020 Summer Olympics in Tokyo, Japan, took place on 5–6 August 2021 at the Makuhari Messe in Mihama-ku.

This freestyle wrestling competition consists of a single-elimination tournament, with a repechage used to determine the winner of two bronze medals. The two finalists face off for gold and silver medals. Each wrestler who loses to one of the two finalists moves into the repechage, culminating in a pair of bronze medal matches featuring the semifinal losers each facing the remaining repechage opponent from their half of the bracket.

The medals for the competition were presented by Uğur Erdener, IOC Member; Turkey, and the medalists' bouquets were presented by Stanley Dziedzic, UWW Vice-President; United States, Olympian, one Bronze Medal.

== Schedule ==
All times are Japan Standard Time (UTC+09:00)

Date	Time	Event
5 August 2021	11:00	Qualification rounds
5 August 2021	18:15	Semifinals
6 August 2021	11:00	Repechage
6 August 2021	19:30	Finals

== Results ==
Legend

- F — Won by fall

=== Main bracket ===
1/8 finals
Geno Petriashvili (GEO)	11
Diaaeldin Kamal (EGY)	0
Sergey Kozyrev (ROC)	1
Deng Zhiwei (CHN)	4
Egzon Shala (KOS)	6^{F}
Djahid Berrahal (ALG)	0
Amir Hossein Zare (IRI)	7
Oleksandr Khotsianivskyi (UKR)	0
Taha Akgül (TUR)	5
Amar Dhesi (CAN)	0
Aiaal Lazarev (KGZ)	0
Gable Steveson (USA)	10
Mönkhtöriin Lkhagvagerel (MGL)	8
Dzianis Khramiankou (BLR)	4
Gennadij Cudinovic (GER)	2^{F}
Yusup Batirmurzaev (KAZ)	10

1/4 finals
Geno Petriashvili (GEO)	5
Deng Zhiwei (CHN)	2
Egzon Shala (KOS)	2
Amir Hossein Zare (IRI)	13
Taha Akgül (TUR)	0
Gable Steveson (USA)	8
Mönkhtöriin Lkhagvagerel (MGL)	6
Gennadij Cudinovic (GER)	5

Semifinals
Geno Petriashvili (GEO)	6
Amir Hossein Zare (IRI)	3
Gable Steveson (USA)	5
Mönkhtöriin Lkhagvagerel (MGL)	0

Final
Geno Petriashvili (GEO)	8
Gable Steveson (USA)	10

=== Repechage ===
Repechage
Diaaeldin Kamal (EGY)	2
Deng Zhiwei (CHN)	7
Aiaal Lazarev (KGZ)	0
Taha Akgül (TUR)	4

Bronze medal matches
Deng Zhiwei (CHN)	0
Amir Hossein Zare (IRI)	5
Taha Akgül (TUR)	5
Mönkhtöriin Lkhagvagerel (MGL)	0

== Final standing ==
Rank	Athlete
1st place, gold medalist(s)	Gable Steveson (USA)
2nd place, silver medalist(s)	Geno Petriashvili (GEO)
3rd place, bronze medalist(s)	Amir Hossein Zare (IRI)
3rd place, bronze medalist(s)	Taha Akgül (TUR)
5	Deng Zhiwei (CHN)
5	Mönkhtöriin Lkhagvagerel (MGL)
7	Egzon Shala (KOS)
8	Gennadij Cudinovic (GER)
9	Dzianis Khramiankou (BLR)
10	Diaaeldin Kamal (EGY)
11	Sergey Kozyrev (ROC)
12	Yusup Batirmurzaev (KAZ)
13	Amar Dhesi (CAN)
14	Djahid Berrahal (ALG)
15	Oleksandr Khotsianivskyi (UKR)
16	Aiaal Lazarev (KGZ)
