= 2017 European Wrestling Championships – Men's freestyle 125 kg =

The men's freestyle 125 kg is a competition featured at the 2017 European Wrestling Championships, and was held in Novi Sad, Serbia on May 5.

== Medalists ==
Gold	Taha Akgül; Turkey
Silver	Jamaladdin Magomedov; Azerbaijan
Bronze	Levan Berianidze; Armenia
Bronze	Geno Petriashvili; Georgia

== Results ==
Legend

- F — Won by fall

=== Top half ===
==== Section 1 ====
Qualification
Vadzim Shvedau (BLR)	0
Jere Heino (FIN)	5
Chadzji-Murad Istapayev (BEL)	2
Jamaladdin Magomedov (AZE)	13
Levan Berianidze (ARM)	5
Andrei Romanov (MDA)	0
Pedrag Dubaic (SRB)	0
Dániel Ligeti (HUN)	10
Robert Baran (POL)	12
Ioannis Kargiotakis (GRE)	1
Danylo Kartavyi (UKR)	2
Taha Akgül (TUR)	9
Alan Khugaev (RUS)	2
Geno Petriashvili (GEO)	5

Quarterfinals
Soslan Gaglojev (SVK)	10
Jere Heino (FIN)	0
Jamaladdin Magomedov (AZE)	3
Levan Berianidze (ARM)	1
Dániel Ligeti (HUN)	2
Robert Baran (POL)	1
Taha Akgül (TUR)	14
Geno Petriashvili (GEO)	4

Semifinals
Soslan Gaglojev (SVK)	0
Jamaladdin Magomedov (AZE)	7^{F}
Dániel Ligeti (HUN)	0
Taha Akgül (TUR)	5

Final
Jamaladdin Magomedov (AZE)	2
Taha Akgül (TUR)	8

=== Repechage ===
Repechage round 2
Chadzji-Murad Istapayev (BEL)	2
Levan Berianidze (ARM)	5
Danylo Kartavyi (UKR)	2
Geno Petriashvili (GEO)	5

Bronze medals
Levan Berianidze (ARM)	3
Soslan Gaglojev (SVK)	1
Geno Petriashvili (GEO)	4
Dániel Ligeti (HUN)	2
