= 2021 World Wrestling Championships – Men's freestyle 125 kg =

Wrestling competitions

Men's freestyle 125 kg at the 2021 World Championships
- Venue: Nye Jordal Amfi
- Dates: 2–3 October 2021
- Competitors: 19 from 19 nations

Medalists
gold medal	Amir Hossein Zare	Iran
silver medal	Geno Petriashvili	Georgia
bronze medal	Mönkhtöriin Lkhagvagerel	Mongolia
bronze medal	Taha Akgül	Turkey

The men's freestyle 125 kilograms is a competition featured at the 2021 World Wrestling Championships, and was held in Oslo, Norway on 2 and 3 October.

This freestyle wrestling competition consists of a single-elimination tournament, with a repechage used to determine the winner of two bronze medals. The two finalists face off for gold and silver medals. Each wrestler who loses to one of the two finalists moves into the repechage, culminating in a pair of bronze medal matches featuring the semifinal losers each facing the remaining repechage opponent from their half of the bracket.

== Results ==
=== Final ===
Final
Geno Petriashvili (GEO)	2
Amir Hossein Zare (IRI)	9

=== Top half ===
Round of 32

Round of 16
Geno Petriashvili (GEO)	11
Mönkhtöriin Lkhagvagerel (MGL)	1
Johannes Ludescher (AUT)	2
Taiki Yamamoto (JPN)	1
Oleksandr Koldovskyi (UKR)	2
Azamat Khosonov (GRE)	1
Egor Olar (MDA)	5
Oleg Boltin (KAZ)	6

Quarterfinals
Geno Petriashvili (GEO)	5
Johannes Ludescher (AUT)	0
Oleksandr Koldovskyi (UKR)	3
Oleg Boltin (KAZ)	6

Semifinals
Geno Petriashvili (GEO)	10
Oleg Boltin (KAZ)	0

=== Bottom half ===
Round of 32
Jung Yei-hyun (KOR)	0
Zelimkhan Khizriev (RWF)	12
Anirudh Gulia (IND)	3
Youssif Hemida (EGY)	9
Jere Heino (FIN)	2
Robert Baran (POL)	11

Round of 16
Amir Hossein Zare (IRI)	6
Dzianis Khramiankou (BLR)	0
Amar Dhesi (CAN)	3
Nick Gwiazdowski (USA)	8
Zelimkhan Khizriev (RWF)	7
Youssif Hemida (EGY)	3
Robert Baran (POL)	0
Taha Akgül (TUR)	5

Quarterfinals
Amir Hossein Zare (IRI)	10
Nick Gwiazdowski (USA)	0
Zelimkhan Khizriev (RWF)	0
Taha Akgül (TUR)	5

Semifinals
Amir Hossein Zare (IRI)	4
Taha Akgül (TUR)	0

=== Repechage ===
Repechage round 2
Mönkhtöriin Lkhagvagerel (MGL)	4
Johannes Ludescher (AUT)	0
Dzianis Khramiankou (BLR)	1
Nick Gwiazdowski (USA)	6

Bronze medals
Mönkhtöriin Lkhagvagerel (MGL)	5
Oleg Boltin (KAZ)	3
Nick Gwiazdowski (USA)	4
Taha Akgül (TUR)	6

== Final standing ==
Rank	Athlete
1st place, gold medalist(s)	Amir Hossein Zare (IRI)
2nd place, silver medalist(s)	Geno Petriashvili (GEO)
3rd place, bronze medalist(s)	Mönkhtöriin Lkhagvagerel (MGL)
3rd place, bronze medalist(s)	Taha Akgül (TUR)
5	Oleg Boltin (KAZ)
5	Nick Gwiazdowski (USA)
7	Zelimkhan Khizriev (RWF)
8	Youssif Hemida (EGY)
9	Oleksandr Koldovskyi (UKR)
10	Robert Baran (POL)
11	Johannes Ludescher (AUT)
12	Egor Olar (MDA)
13	Amar Dhesi (CAN)
14	Anirudh Gulia (IND)
15	Jere Heino (FIN)
16	Taiki Yamamoto (JPN)
17	Azamat Khosonov (GRE)
18	Dzianis Khramiankou (BLR)
19	Jung Yei-hyun (KOR)
