= Mustafa Kaya =

Turkish freestyle wrestler

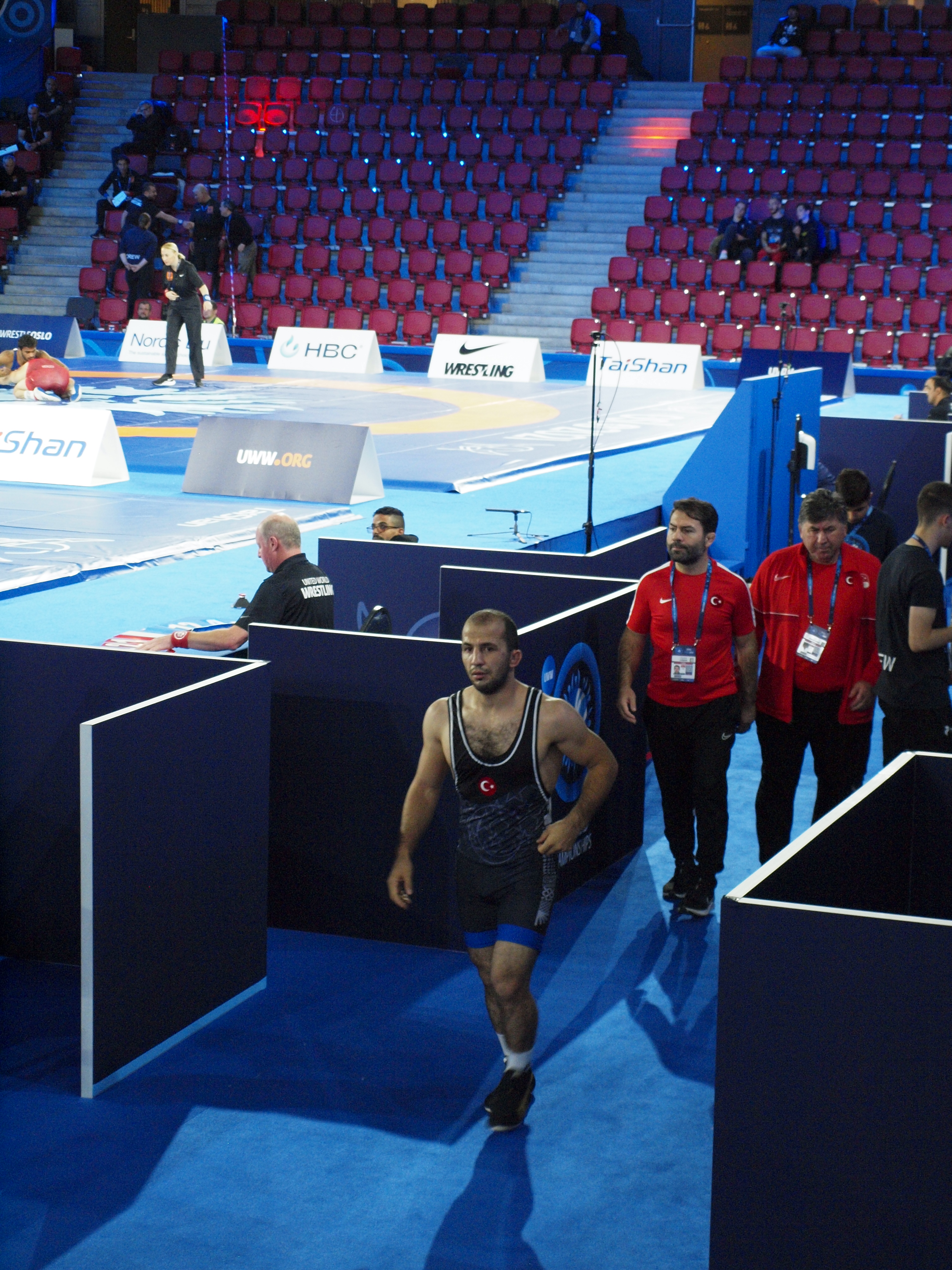

Personal information
- Citizenship: Turkish
- Born: June 6, 1992 (age 34) Tokat, Turkey
- Height: 167 cm (5 ft 6 in)
- Weight: 70 kg (154 lb)

Sport
- Country: Turkey
- Sport: Wrestling
- Event: Freestyle
- Club: ASKI;Ankara
- Coached by: Abdullah Cakmar
Medal record
Men's freestyle wrestling
Representing Turkey
European Games
Bronze medal – third place	2015 Baku	65 kg
European Championships
Gold medal – first place	2019 Bucharest	70 kg
Silver medal – second place	2016 Riga	65 kg
World Cup
Bronze medal – third place	2011 Plauen	66 kg
Mediterranean Games
Gold medal – first place	2013 Mersin	66 kg
Mediterranean Championship
Gold medal – first place	2010 Istanbul	66 kg
Yasar Dogu Tournament
Bronze medal – third place	2018 Istanbul	65 kg
Gold medal – first place	2017 Istanbul	65 kg
Silver medal – second place	2016 Istanbul	65 kg
Gold medal – first place	2015 Istanbul	65 kg
Bronze medal – third place	2014 Istanbul	65 kg
Bronze medal – third place	2013 Ankara	66 kg
Gold medal – first place	2012 Ankara	66 kg
Golden Grand Prix
Bronze medal – third place	2015 Baku	70 kg

Mustafa Kaya (born June 6, 1992) is a Turkish retired freestyle wrestler. He competed in the men's freestyle 65 kg event at the 2016 Summer Olympics, in which he was eliminated in the round of 32 by Alejandro Valdés.
