= Dzianis Khramiankou =

Belarusian freestyle wrestler

Personal information
- Born: 10 July 1996 (age 30) Minsk, Belarus
- Height: 1.82 m (6 ft 0 in)
- Weight: 125 kg (276 lb)

Sport
- Country: Belarus
- Sport: Amateur wrestling
- Event: Freestyle
Medal record
Men's freestyle wrestling
Representing United World Wrestling
European Championships
Bronze medal – third place	2025 Bratislava	125 kg
Grand Prix
Silver medal – second place	2025 Ulaanbaatar	125 kg
Silver medal – second place	2025 Budapest	125 kg
Silver medal – second place	2026 Minsk	125 kg
Bronze medal – third place	2025 Tirana	125 kg
Representing Belarus
Individual World Cup
Bronze medal – third place	2020 Belgrade	125 kg
Dan Kolov & Nikola Petrov Tournament
Gold medal – first place	2022 Veliko Tarnovo	125 kg
Grand Prix
Gold medal – first place	2020 Nice	125 kg
Gold medal – first place	2021 Minsk	125 kg
Bronze medal – third place	2026 Yerevan	125 kg
World U23 Championships
Silver medal – second place	2017 Bydgoszcz	97 kg
Bronze medal – third place	2019 Budapest	97 kg
European U23 Championships
Gold medal – first place	2018 Istanbul	97 kg
Bronze medal – third place	2019 Novi Sad	97 kg

Dzianis Khramiankou (Belarusian: Дзяніс Уладзіміравіч Храмянкоў, born 10 July 1996) is a Belarusian freestyle wrestler.

== Wrestling career ==
In 2018, he won the gold medal in the men's 97 kg event at the European U23 Wrestling Championship held in Istanbul, Turkey. A year later, he won one of the bronze medals in his event at the 2019 World U23 Wrestling Championship in Budapest, Hungary.

In 2020, he won one of the bronze medals in the men's 125 kg event at the Individual Wrestling World Cup held in Belgrade, Serbia. In March 2021, he qualified at the European Qualification Tournament to compete at the 2020 Summer Olympics in Tokyo, Japan. He competed in the men's 125 kg event. Two months after the Olympics, he competed in the men's 125 kg event at the 2021 World Wrestling Championships held in Oslo, Norway.

He lost his bronze medal match in the men's 125 kg event at the 2024 European Wrestling Championships held in Bucharest, Romania. He competed at the 2024 European Wrestling Olympic Qualification Tournament in Baku, Azerbaijan and he earned a quota place for the Individual Neutral Athletes for the 2024 Summer Olympics in Paris, France.
