= Amar Dhesi =

Canadian freestyle wrestler

Personal information
- Full name: Amarveer Singh Dhesi
- Born: September 2, 1995 (age 30) Surrey, British Columbia, Canada
- Weight: 125 kg (276 lb)
Medal record
Men's freestyle wrestling
Representing Canada
Commonwealth Games
Gold medal – first place	2022 Birmingham	125 kg
Pan American Championships
Gold medal – first place	2022 Acapulco	125 kg
Silver medal – second place	2020 Ottawa	125 kg
Grand Prix
Gold medal – first place	2019 Warsaw	125 kg
Gold medal – first place	2021 Rome	125 kg
Silver medal – second place	2016 Madrid	125 kg
Silver medal – second place	2020 Rome	125 kg
Bronze medal – third place	2019 New York	125 kg
Junior World Championships
Gold medal – first place	2014 Zagreb	120 kg

Amarveer Singh Dhesi (born September 2, 1995), commonly known as Amar Dhesi, is a Canadian freestyle wrestler, competing in the 125 kg weight class.

== Wrestling career ==
=== Junior level ===
In 2014, Dhesi won silver at the 2014 Junior World Championships in Zagreb, Croatia, which was later upgraded to gold, after the winner tested positive for doping.

After this tournament, Dhesi suffered three ACL tears in his knee in six years, limiting his ability to compete.

=== Collegiate ===
Dhesi competed collegiately for the Oregon State Beavers, where he was a three-time NCAA Division I All-American in the 285-pound weight class.

=== Senior level ===
In December 2019, Dhesi won the Canadian trials, which allowed him to represent Canada at the 2020 Pan American Wrestling Olympic Qualification Tournament. In March 2020, he finished in the top two at the tournament, which officially qualified him for the 2020 Summer Olympics in Tokyo. Dhesi would also go onto win the Matteo Pellicone Ranking Series 2021.

In May 2021, Dhesi was officially named to Canada's 2020 Olympic team. He competed in the men's 125 kg event at the 2020 Summer Olympics. Two months after the Olympics, he competed in the men's 125 kg event at the 2021 World Wrestling Championships held in Oslo, Norway.

At the 2022 Commonwealth Games, Dhesi won the gold medal in the 125 kg event. He competed in the 125 kg event at the 2022 World Wrestling Championships held in Belgrade, Serbia.

In 2024, at the Pan American Wrestling Olympic Qualification Tournament held in Acapulco, Mexico, he earned a quota place for Canada for the 2024 Summer Olympics held in Paris, France. He competed in the men's 125 kg event at the Olympics.

== Personal life ==
Born in Canada, Dhesi is of Punjabi descent.
