= 2016 Yasar Dogu Tournament =

Yasar Dogu 2016
- Host city: Istanbul, Turkey
- Dates: 5–7 February
- Stadium: Ahmet Cömert Sport Hall

Champions
- Freestyle: Turkey
- Women: Turkey

The 44th Yasar Dogu Tournament 2016, was a wrestling event held in Istanbul, Turkey between 5–7 February 2016.

This international tournament includes competition in both men's and women's freestyle wrestling. This ranking tournament was held was held in honor of the Olympic Champion, Yaşar Doğu.

== Medal table ==
* Host nation (Turkey)

Rank	Nation	Gold	Silver	Bronze	Total
1	Turkey*	11	6	15	32
2	Mongolia	1	3	1	5
3	France	1	2	1	4
4	Azerbaijan	1	1	6	8
5	Bulgaria	1	1	0	2
5	United States	1	1	0	2
7	Romania	0	1	3	4
8	Norway	0	1	0	1
9	Kazakhstan	0	0	1	1
Totals (9 entries)		16	16	27	59

== Team ranking ==
Rank	Men's freestyle		Women's freestyle	
Rank	Team	Points	Team	Points
1	Turkey	76	Turkey	77
2	Mongolia	52	France	33
3	Azerbaijan	47	Romania	31
4	United States	26	Bulgaria	19
5	Romania	12	Norway	9
6	France	9	Argentina	2
7	Tunisia	8		
8	Kazakhstan	8		
9	Kyrgyzstan	6		
10	Puerto Rico	4		

== Medal overview ==
=== Men's freestyle ===
Event	Gold	Silver	Bronze
57 kg	Süleyman Atlı; Turkey	Damdinbazaryn Tsogtbaatar; Mongolia	Giorgi Edisherashvili; Azerbaijan
57 kg	Süleyman Atlı; Turkey	Damdinbazaryn Tsogtbaatar; Mongolia	Mahir Amiraslanov; Azerbaijan
61 kg	Mehmet Söyler; Turkey	Tümenbilegiin Tüvshintulga; Mongolia	Mustafa Kartal; Turkey
61 kg	Mehmet Söyler; Turkey	Tümenbilegiin Tüvshintulga; Mongolia	Recep Topal; Turkey
65 kg	Batchuluuny Batmagnai; Mongolia	Mustafa Kaya; Turkey	Aghahuseyn Mustafayev; Azerbaijan
65 kg	Batchuluuny Batmagnai; Mongolia	Mustafa Kaya; Turkey	George Bucur; Romania
70 kg	Muhammed İlkhan; Turkey	Gadzhimurad Omarov; Azerbaijan	Gitinomagomed Gadzhiyev; Azerbaijan
70 kg	Muhammed İlkhan; Turkey	Gadzhimurad Omarov; Azerbaijan	Azamat Omurzhanov; Kazakhstan
74 kg	Jordan Burroughs; United States	Zelimkhan Khadjiev; France	İslam Kılıç; Turkey
74 kg	Jordan Burroughs; United States	Zelimkhan Khadjiev; France	Soner Demirtaş; Turkey
86 kg	Aleksander Gostiyev; Azerbaijan	Selim Yaşar; Turkey	Pürevjavyn Önörbat; Mongolia
86 kg	Aleksander Gostiyev; Azerbaijan	Selim Yaşar; Turkey	Gamzet Osmanov; Azerbaijan
97 kg	Fatih Yaşarlı; Turkey	Dorjkhandyn Khüderbulga; Mongolia	Müren Mutlu; Turkey
97 kg	Fatih Yaşarlı; Turkey	Dorjkhandyn Khüderbulga; Mongolia	İbrahim Bölükbaşı; Turkey
125 kg	Taha Akgül; Turkey	Tony Nelson; United States	Yasin Kılıç; Turkey
125 kg	Taha Akgül; Turkey	Tony Nelson; United States	Jamaladdin Magomedov; Azerbaijan

=== Women's freestyle ===
Event	Gold	Silver	Bronze
48 kg	Evin Demirhan; Turkey	Aysun Erge; Turkey	Sümeyye Sezer; Turkey
48 kg	Evin Demirhan; Turkey	Aysun Erge; Turkey	Alina Vuc; Romania
53 kg	Mélanie Lesaffre; France	Bediha Gün; Turkey	Amine Nur Armut; Turkey
53 kg	Mélanie Lesaffre; France	Bediha Gün; Turkey	Simona Pricob; Romania
55 kg	Burcu Kebiç; Turkey	Nuray Karadağ; Turkey	Cemile Unudan; Turkey
58 kg	Bilyana Dudova; Bulgaria	Aurélie Basset; France	Derya Bayhan; Turkey
58 kg	Bilyana Dudova; Bulgaria	Aurélie Basset; France	Aybike Çintaş; Turkey
60 kg	Neslihan Ulusoy; Turkey	Özlem Gündoğan; Turkey	Not awarded
63 kg	Hafize Şahin; Turkey	Kriszta Incze; Romania	Aslı Tuğcu; Turkey
69 kg	Buse Tosun; Turkey	Vanova Bobeva; Bulgaria	Sinem Topçu; Turkey
69 kg	Buse Tosun; Turkey	Vanova Bobeva; Bulgaria	Burcu Üğdüler; Turkey
75 kg	Yasemin Adar; Turkey	Signe Marie Store; Norway	Cynthia Vescan; France

== Participating nations ==
204 wrestlers from 16 countries:

1. Argentina (2)
2. Azerbaijan (13)
3. Bulgaria (2)
4. France (7)
5. Greece (1)
6. Kazakhstan (2)
7. Kyrgyzstan (3)
8. Mongolia (16)
9. Macedonia (3)
10. Norway (1)
11. Puerto Rico (2)
12. Romania (8)
13. Turkmenistan (3)
14. Tunisia (7)
15. Turkey (123) (Host)
16. United States (10)

== See also ==
- 2016 Vehbi Emre & Hamit Kaplan Tournament
