= Gennadij Cudinovic =

German freestyle wrestler

Personal information
- Born: 21 February 1994 (age 32) Kazakhstan

Sport
- Country: Germany
- Sport: Amateur wrestling
- Weight class: 125 kg
- Event: Freestyle
Medal record
Men's freestyle wrestling
Representing Germany
Grand Prix
Gold medal – first place	2025 Nice	125 kg
Bronze medal – third place	2022 Madrid	125 kg
Bronze medal – third place	2023 Nice	125 kg
European Police Championship
Gold medal – first place	2016 Bratislava	125 kg
European U23 Championships
Bronze medal – third place	2017 Szombathely	97 kg

Gennadij Cudinovic (born 21 February 1994) is a German freestyle wrestler.

He won one of the bronze medals in the men's 97 kg event at the 2017 European U23 Wrestling Championship held in Szombathely, Hungary. He competed in the men's 97 kg event at the European Wrestling Championships in 2018, 2019 and 2020.

In 2019, Cudinovic represented Germany in the men's 97 kg event at the European Games held in Minsk, Belarus. He was eliminated in his first match by Aliaksandr Hushtyn of Belarus.

In March 2021, Cudinovic qualified at the European Qualification Tournament to compete at the 2020 Summer Olympics in Tokyo, Japan. He competed in the men's 125 kg event where he was eliminated in his second match by Mönkhtöriin Lkhagvagerel of Mongolia.

In 2022, Cudinovic competed at the Yasar Dogu Tournament held in Istanbul, Turkey. He also competed in the 125 kg event at the 2022 European Wrestling Championships held in Budapest, Hungary. He competed in the 125 kg event at the 2022 World Wrestling Championships held in Belgrade, Serbia.

Cudinovic competed at the 2024 European Wrestling Olympic Qualification Tournament in Baku, Azerbaijan hoping to qualify for the 2024 Summer Olympics in Paris, France. He was eliminated in his first match and he did not qualify for the Olympics. Cudinovic also competed at the 2024 World Wrestling Olympic Qualification Tournament held in Istanbul, Turkey without qualifying for the Olympics.
