= Ibrahim Saidau =

Russian-Belarusian wrestler

Ibrahim Saidau Ибрагим Саидов
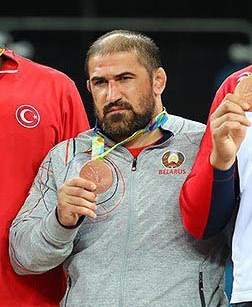
- Saidau at the 2016 Olympics

Personal information
- Nationality: Russia
- Born: Ibragim Magomedovich Saidov; 9 March 1985 (age 41) Kokrek, Khasavyurtovsky District, Dagestan, Soviet Union
- Education: Dagestan State University
- Height: 175 cm (5 ft 9 in)

Sport
- Country: Belarus
- Sport: Wrestling
- Weight class: 97-125 kg
- Event: Freestyle
- Club: Dynamo Makhachkala (RUS); Grodno (BEL)
- Coached by: Imanmurza Aliev
Medal record
Men's freestyle wrestling
Representing Belarus
Olympic Games
Bronze medal – third place	2016 Rio de Janeiro	125 kg
Grand Prix
Silver medal – second place	2020 Nice	125 kg
Bronze medal – third place	2015 Khasvyurt	125 kg
Bronze medal – third place	2018 Yakutsk	125 kg
Bronze medal – third place	2018 Minsk	125 kg

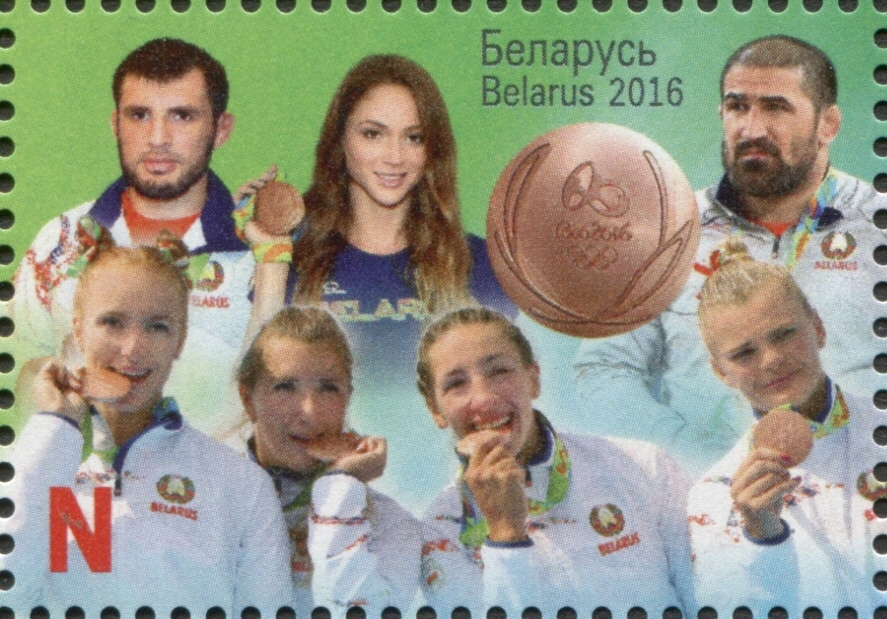
Saidau (right) on a 2016 stamp of Belarus

Ibragim Magomedovich Saidov' (Russian: Ибрагим Магомедович Саидов; born March 9, 1985) is a Russian and Belarusian freestyle wrestler of Avar heritage. He won a bronze medal in the 125 kg weight division at the 2016 Olympics.

Saidau took up wrestling in 2000 in Khasavyurt, following his elder brother. He served a doping-related ban imposed by the Russian Anti-Doping Agency between May 2012 and June 2014. After the ban ended he represented Belarus.
