= 2015 Yasar Dogu Tournament =

Yasar Dogu 2015
- Host city: Istanbul, Turkey
- Dates: 28–29 March
- Stadium: Ahmet Cömert Sport Hall

Champions
- Freestyle: Turkey

The 43rd Yasar Dogu Tournament 2015, was a wrestling event held in Istanbul, Turkey between 28 and 29 March 2016.

This international tournament includes competition men's freestyle wrestling. This ranking tournament was held was held in honor of the Olympic Champion, Yaşar Doğu.

== Medal table ==
* Host nation (Turkey)

Rank	Nation	Gold	Silver	Bronze	Total
1	Russia	3	0	5	8
2	Turkey*	2	3	3	8
3	Poland	1	1	1	3
4	Azerbaijan	1	0	2	3
5	Kazakhstan	1	0	1	2
6	Georgia	0	1	1	2
7	Bulgaria	0	1	0	1
7	Kyrgyzstan	0	1	0	1
7	Moldova	0	1	0	1
10	United States	0	0	3	3
Totals (10 entries)		8	8	16	32

== Team ranking ==
Rank	Men's freestyle	
Rank	Team	Points
1	Turkey	69
2	Russia	51
3	United States	42
4	Poland	39
5	Kazakhstan	36
6	Azerbaijan	32
7	Moldova	19
8	Georgia	17
9	Uzbekistan	13
10	Bulgaria	9

== Men's freestyle ==
Event	Gold	Silver	Bronze
57 kg	Nurislam Sanayev; Kazakhstan	Sezar Akgül; Turkey	Ruslan Gasimov; Azerbaijan
57 kg	Nurislam Sanayev; Kazakhstan	Sezar Akgül; Turkey	Otari Gogava; Georgia
61 kg	Dzhamal Otarsultanov; Russia	Münir Recep Aktaş; Turkey	Viktor Lebedev; Russia
61 kg	Dzhamal Otarsultanov; Russia	Münir Recep Aktaş; Turkey	Rustam Ampar; Russia
65 kg	Mustafa Kaya; Turkey	Borislav Novachkov; Bulgaria	Aghahuseyn Mustafayev; Azerbaijan
65 kg	Mustafa Kaya; Turkey	Borislav Novachkov; Bulgaria	Jimmy Kennedy; United States
70 kg	Magomedmurad Gadzhiev; Poland	Evgeny Nedealko; Moldova	Mulid Lampezhev; Russia
70 kg	Magomedmurad Gadzhiev; Poland	Evgeny Nedealko; Moldova	Jordan Oliver; United States
74 kg	Denis Tsargush; Russia	Soner Demirtaş; Turkey	Khetag Tsabolov; Russia
74 kg	Denis Tsargush; Russia	Soner Demirtaş; Turkey	Akhmed Gadzhimagomedov; Russia
86 kg	Aleksander Gostiyev; Azerbaijan	Radosław Grzybicki; Poland	Keith Gavin; United States
86 kg	Aleksander Gostiyev; Azerbaijan	Radosław Grzybicki; Poland	Ahmet Bilici; Turkey
97 kg	Abdusalam Gadisov; Russia	Dato Marsagishvili; Georgia	Radoslaw Baran; Poland
97 kg	Abdusalam Gadisov; Russia	Dato Marsagishvili; Georgia	İbrahim Bölükbaşı; Turkey
125 kg	Taha Akgül; Turkey	Aiaal Lazarev; Kyrgyzstan	Daulet Shabanbay; Kazakhstan
125 kg	Taha Akgül; Turkey	Aiaal Lazarev; Kyrgyzstan	Tanju Gemici; Turkey

== Participating nations ==
223 wrestlers from 22 countries:

1. Algeria (3)
2. Armenia (1)
3. Azerbaijan (8)
4. Belarus (1)
5. Bulgaria (5)
6. Georgia (14)
7. Germany (2)
8. Iran (5)
9. Kazakhstan (31)
10. Kyrgyzstan (1)
11. Morocco (3)
12. Moldova (8)
13. Macedonia (3)
14. Poland (8)
15. Romania (4)
16. Russia (17)
17. Slovakia (4)
18. Tajikistan (2)
19. Turkmenistan (7)
20. Turkey (66) (Host)
21. United States (23)
22. Uzbekistan (7)

== See also ==
- 2015 Vehbi Emre & Hamit Kaplan Tournament
