= Levan Berianidze =

Georgian-Armenian freestyle wrestler

Personal information
- Nationality: Georgian; Armenian
- Born: 10 October 1990 (age 35) Tbilisi, Georgia
- Height: 1.84 m (6 ft 1/2 in)
- Weight: 120 kg (260 lb)

Sport
- Sport: Wrestling
- Event: Freestyle
Medal record
Men's Freestyle wrestling
Representing Armenia
World Championships
Bronze medal – third place	2015 Las Vegas	125 kg
Bronze medal – third place	2017 Paris	125 kg
European Championships
Bronze medal – third place	2017 Novi Sad	125 kg
Grand Prix
Gold medal – first place	2015 Vanadzor	125 kg
Gold medal – first place	2017 Vanadzor	125 kg
Bronze medal – third place	2016 Vanadzor	125 kg
Representing Georgia
World Championships
Bronze medal – third place	2010 Moscow	120 kg
Golden Grand Prix
Silver medal – second place	2010 Tbilisi	120 kg
Bronze medal – third place	2010 Baku	120 kg
Grand Prix
Bronze medal – third place	2011 Tbilisi	120 kg

Levan Berianidze (Georgian: ლევან ბერიანიძე; born 10 October 1990 in Tbilisi) is a Georgian-Armenian male freestyle wrestler. He won a bronze medal for Georgia at the 2010 World Wrestling Championships in Moscow. In 2011 he won the gold medal in Beach Wrestling. On 26 November 2014, Berianidze was given Armenian citizenship and freed from service in the Armenian army. Berianidze competed for Armenia at the 2016 Summer Olympics in Rio. He won a bronze medal for Armenia at the 2017 World Wrestling Championships in Paris and in European Wrestling Championship in Serbia. Besides, Levan won the European Sumo Championship in 2013 in Germany and got a silver medal at the 2014 European Sumo Championship in Bulgaria.
