= Dimitar Kumchev =

Bulgarian freestyle wrestler

Dimitar Kumchev (born April 20, 1980) is a Bulgarian freestyle wrestler. He competed in the men's freestyle 125 kg event at the 2016 Summer Olympics, in which he was eliminated in the round of 32 by Geno Petriashvili.
