= Alen Zaseyev =

Ukrainian freestyle wrestler

Alen Taymurazovich Zaseyev
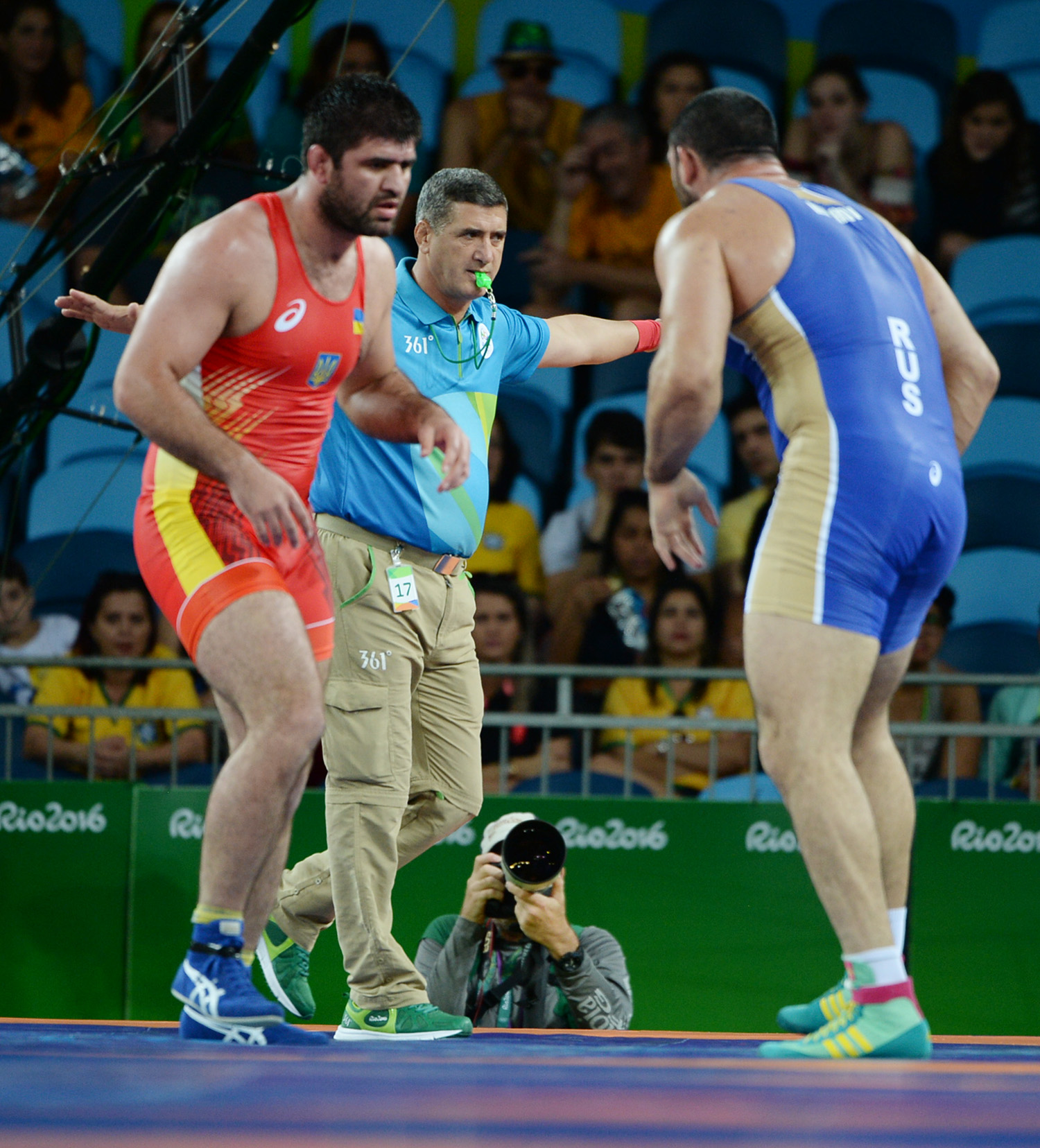
- Zasyeyev (left) against Bilyal Makhov at the 2016 Olympics

Personal information
- Native name: Ален Таймуразович Засєєв
- Full name: Alen Taymurazovich Zaseyev
- Nationality: Ukrainian
- Born: 10 October 1988 (age 37) Vakhtana, Georgian SSR
- Height: 1.93 m (6 ft 4 in)
- Weight: 111 kg (245 lb)

Sport
- Country: Ukraine
- Sport: Wrestling
- Event: Freestyle
- Coached by: Ruslan Rubaev
Medal record
Men's Freestyle wrestling
Representing Ukraine
World Championships
Silver medal – second place	Budapest 2013	120 kg
European Championships
Silver medal – second place	2013 Tbilisi	120 kg
Bronze medal – third place	2016 Riga	125 kg
Dan Kolov - Nikola Petrov Tournament
Gold medal – first place	2017 Ruse	125 kg
- Updated on 22 September 2013

Alen Taymurazovich Zaseyev (Russian: Ален Таймуразович Засеев; Iron Ossetic: Засеты Таймуразы фырт Ален, born 10 October 1988) is a Ukrainian freestyle wrestler.

== Career ==
He won both silver medals in the 2013 European Wrestling Championships in Tbilisi, Georgia and 2013 World Wrestling Championships in Budapest, Hungary. In 2016 European Wrestling Championships won bronze medal.

In May 2016, he was provisionally suspended due to use of meldonium. Later that decision was reverted.
