= Magomedgadzhi Nurasulov =

Serbian freestyle wrestler (born 1992)

Personal information
- Native name: Магомедгаджи Абдурахманович Нурасулов
- Full name: Magomedgadzhi Abdurakhmanovich Nurasulov
- Born: 15 July 1992 (age 34)
- Height: 189 cm (6 ft 2 in)
- Weight: 125 kg (276 lb)

Sport
- Country: Serbia
- Sport: Wrestling
- Event: Freestyle wrestling
- Club: Sport School of Ali Aliev; Machachkala
- Coached by: Sadrudin Nasrudinov
Medal record
Men's freestyle wrestling
Representing Serbia
Mediterranean Games
Gold medal – first place	2022 Oran	125 kg
Representing Russia
World Junior Championships
Gold medal – first place	2012 Pattaya	120 kg

Magomedgadzhi Nurasulov (Магомедгаджи Абдурахманович Нурасулов; born 15 July 1992) is a Serbian freestyle wrestler of Russian origin. He won the gold medal in the men's 125 kg event at the 2022 Mediterranean Games and the gold medal in the 120 kg event at the 2012 World Junior Wrestling Championships.

== Career ==
Nurasulov competed for Russia early in his career and won the gold medal at the 2012 World Junior Championships in the super-heavyweight category.

He later represented Russia at senior level, including at the 2013 European Wrestling Championships. At domestic level, he was runner-up at the Russian national championships in 2017 and won bronze in 2018.

From 2022, Nurasulov represented Serbia in international competition. At the 2022 European Wrestling Championships, he finished fifth in the men's freestyle 125 kg event. Later that year, he won the gold medal at the 2022 Mediterranean Games in Oran and also competed at the 2022 World Wrestling Championships in Belgrade.
