= Rareș Chintoan =

Romanian freestyle wrestler

Personal information
- Born: 13 January 1983 (age 43) Cluj-Napoca, Romania

Sport
- Country: Romania
- Sport: Freestyle wrestling

Rareş Daniel Chintoan (born 13 January 1983 in Cluj-Napoca) is a Romanian freestyle wrestler who competes in the under 120 kg weight class. He competed in the 120 kg events at the 2008 and 2012 Summer Olympics and was eliminated in the 1/8 finals at both.
