= Nick Matuhin =

German freestyle wrestler

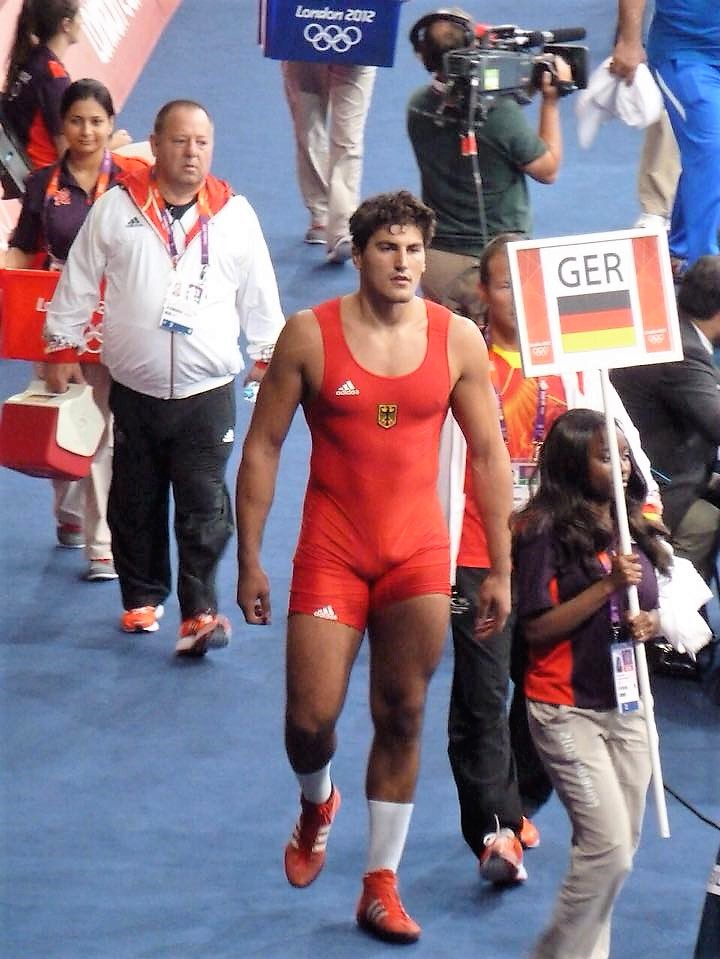

Personal information
- Nationality: Germany
- Born: 5 April 1990 (age 36) Moscow, Russian SFSR, Soviet; Union
- Height: 1.98 m (6 ft 6 in)
- Weight: 120 kg (265 lb)

Sport
- Style: Freestyle
- Club: SC Luckenwalde (GER)
- Coach: Alexander Leipold

Nick Matuhin (born as Nikita Matuhin Russian: Никита Матюхин on 5 April 1990 in Moscow, Russian SFSR, Soviet Union) is an amateur German freestyle wrestler, who competed in the men's super heavyweight category. He is currently a member of SC Luckenwalde in Luckenwalde, Brandenburg, and is coached and trained by four-time Olympian Alexander Leipold. Matuhin stands 1.98 metres (6 ft 6 in) tall, and weighs 120 kilograms (265 lb).

Matuhin qualified for the men's 120 kg class at the 2012 Summer Olympics in London by placing second from the Olympic Qualification Tournament in Taiyuan, China. At the Olympics, he received a bye for the preliminary round of sixteen match, before losing to Uzbekistani wrestler and two-time Olympic champion Artur Taymazov, with a two-set technical score (0–4, 0–2), and a classification point score of 0–3. Because his opponent advanced into the final, Matuhin was entered into the repechage rounds which decide the bronze medals. He was defeated in the first round of the repechage by Iran's Komeil Ghasemi, who was able to score one point each in two straight periods, leaving Matuhin without a single point.
