= Jamaladdin Magomedov =

Azerbaijani freestyle wrestler (born 1989)

Jamaladdin Magomedov Джамаладдин Магомедов
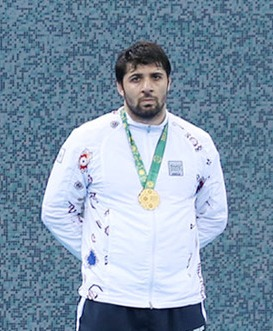
- Magomedov in 2017

Personal information
- Full name: Jamaladdin Gadzhievich Magomedov
- Nationality: Russian, Azerbaijani
- Born: 14 April 1989 (age 37) Makhachkala, Dagestan ASSR, Russian SFSR
- Height: 1.85 m (6 ft 1 in)
- Weight: 110 kg (243 lb)

Sport
- Country: Russia; Azerbaijan
- Club: Atasport Baku (AZE)
- Coached by: Anvar Magomedgadzhiev (Dagestan)
Medal record
Men's freestyle wrestling
Representing Azerbaijan
World Championships
Bronze medal – third place	2011 Istanbul	120 kg
Silver medal – second place	2015 Las Vegas	125 kg
European Championships
Bronze medal – third place	2011 Dortmund	120 kg
Bronze medal – third place	2013 Tbilisi	120 kg
Silver medal – second place	2017 Novi Sad	125 kg
Bronze medal – third place	2018 Kaspiysk	125 kg
Bronze medal – third place	2020 Rome	125 kg
European Games
Bronze medal – third place	2015 Baku	125 kg
Bronze medal – third place	2019 Minsk	125 kg
Islamic Solidarity Games
Gold medal – first place	2017 Baku	125 kg
Yasar Dogu Tournament
Gold medal – first place	2020 Istanbul	125 kg

Jamaladdin Gadzhievich Magomedov (Russian: Джамаладдин Магомедов; Azerbaijani: Camaləddin Məhəmmədov; born March 14, 1989, in Makhachkala) is a Russian-born naturalized Azerbaijani freestyle wrestler of Avar descent, who played for the men's super heavyweight category. In 2011, Magomedov had won two bronze medals at the World Wrestling Championships in Istanbul, Turkey, and at the European Wrestling Championships in Dortmund, Germany. He is also a member of Atasport Wrestling Club in Baku, and is coached and trained by Anvar Magomedgadzhiev of Russia.

Magomedov represented his current nation Azerbaijan at the 2012 Summer Olympics in London, where he competed for the men's 120 kg class. He lost the qualifying match to Russia's Bilyal Makhov, who was able to score five points in two straight periods, leaving Magomedov without a single point.

At the 2016 Olympics, he lost to Tervel Dlagnev in the second round. In March 2021, he competed at the European Qualification Tournament in Budapest, Hungary hoping to qualify for the 2020 Summer Olympics in Tokyo, Japan.
