= 2012 Pan American Wrestling Olympic Qualification Tournament =

The 2012 Olympic Wrestling Pan American Qualification Tournament was the second regional qualifying tournament for the 2012 Olympics. The competition was held in Kissimmee, United States from 23 to 25 March 2012.

The top two wrestlers in each weight class earn a qualification spot for their nation.

== Men's freestyle ==
=== 55 kg ===
24 March

Quarterfinals
Brandon Escobar (HON)	7	6
Luis Orantes (GUA)	4	0
Fernando Paredes (VEN)	2	2
André Quispe (CHI)	0	1

Semifinals
Yerson Hernández (COL)	0	0
David Tremblay (CAN)	6	7
Brandon Escobar (HON)	2	1	8
Fernando Paredes (VEN)	0	3	3

Final
David Tremblay (CAN)	4	7
Brandon Escobar (HON)	0	0

Bronze medals
Bye
Yerson Hernández (COL)
Luis Orantes (GUA)	W	O
Fernando Paredes (VEN)

=== 60 kg ===
25 March

Round of 16
Hernán Guzmán (COL)	1	3
Luis Portillo (ESA)	0	0
Sebastián Pérez (ARG)	0	2	0
Wilfredo Henríquez (VEN)	1	0	2

Quarterfinals
John Pineda (CAN)	0	0
Yowlys Bonne (CUB)	2	3
Shawn Bunch (USA)	6	1	4
Gabriel García (DOM)	0	4	1
Abel Herrera (PER)	0	0
Guillermo Torres (MEX)	1	6
Hernán Guzmán (COL)	0	1
Wilfredo Henríquez (VEN)	2	1

Semifinals
Yowlys Bonne (CUB)	1	6
Shawn Bunch (USA)	1	0
Guillermo Torres (MEX)	1	1
Wilfredo Henríquez (VEN)	0	1

Final
Yowlys Bonne (CUB)	4	4
Guillermo Torres (MEX)	0	0

Bronze medals
John Pineda (CAN)	0	0
Shawn Bunch (USA)	5	3
Abel Herrera (PER)	0	0
Wilfredo Henríquez (VEN)	2	1

=== 66 kg ===
25 March

Quarterfinals			Semifinals			Final
Marcelo Castro (CHI)	0	0
Edison Hurtado (COL)	6	6	Edison Hurtado (COL)	0	2
Brent Metcalf (USA)	3	4	Brent Metcalf (USA)	2	4^{F}
Elvis Fuentes (VEN)	0	0				Brent Metcalf (USA)	0	0
Yoan Blanco (ECU)	0	0				Haislan Garcia (CAN)	1	3
Haislan Garcia (CAN)	1	1	Haislan Garcia (CAN)	2	1
Fernando Mendoza (PAN)	0	0	Pedro Soto (PUR)	0	0
Pedro Soto (PUR)	1	3

Bronze medals
Elvis Fuentes (VEN)	0	0
Edison Hurtado (COL)	1	1
Yoan Blanco (ECU)	1	1	0
Pedro Soto (PUR)	1	0	2

=== 74 kg ===
25 March

Round of 16
Juan Esteban Martínez (COL)	0
Alvis Almendra (PAN)	3^{F}

Quarterfinals
Matt Gentry (CAN)	5	3
Pool Ambrocio (PER)	0	0
Yunierki Blanco (CUB)	5^{F}
Ângelo Moreira (BRA)	0
Eduardo Gajardo (CHI)	0	1	2
Juan Chaparro (MEX)	1	0	0
Francisco Soler (PUR)	3^{F}
Alvis Almendra (PAN)	1

Semifinals
Matt Gentry (CAN)	2	0	1
Yunierki Blanco (CUB)	1	3	1
Eduardo Gajardo (CHI)	0	0
Francisco Soler (PUR)	1	1

Final
Matt Gentry (CAN)	6	7
Francisco Soler (PUR)	0	0

Bronze medals
Pool Ambrocio (PER)	0	0
Yunierki Blanco (CUB)	3	2
Alvis Almendra (PAN)	0	0
Eduardo Gajardo (CHI)	1	4

=== 84 kg ===
25 March

Quarterfinals
Alejandro Gallardo (MEX)	0	0
Humberto Arencibia (CUB)	4	7
Jeff Adamson (CAN)	0
Jaime Espinal (PUR)	3^{F}
Jarlis Mosquera (COL)	0	0
José Daniel Díaz (VEN)	1	2

Semifinals
Adrian Jaoude (BRA)	0	0
Humberto Arencibia (CUB)	1	2
Jaime Espinal (PUR)	3	1
José Daniel Díaz (VEN)	1	0

Final
Humberto Arencibia (CUB)	3	2	6
Jaime Espinal (PUR)	3	0	0

Bronze medals
Alejandro Gallardo (MEX)	3	0
Adrian Jaoude (BRA)	4	4
Jeff Adamson (CAN)	1	1
José Daniel Díaz (VEN)	1	0

=== 96 kg ===
25 March

Quarterfinals
Yuri Maier (ARG)	1	0
Khetag Pliev (CAN)	6	6
Marcos Santos (PUR)	0	0
Luis Vivenes (VEN)	3	3

Semifinals
Javier Cortina (CUB)	1	1
Israel Silva (MEX)	0	1
Khetag Pliev (CAN)	0	3	5
Luis Vivenes (VEN)	3	0	0

Final
Javier Cortina (CUB)	2	2
Khetag Pliev (CAN)	1	0

Bronze medals
Bye
Israel Silva (MEX)
Yuri Maier (ARG)	1	2	2
Luis Vivenes (VEN)	0	8	3

=== 120 kg ===
25 March

Quarterfinals
Víctor Asprilla (COL)	0	0
Antoine Jaoude (BRA)	1	2
Jesse Ruíz (MEX)	7	5
Edgardo López (PUR)	0	2

Semifinals
Arjan Bhullar (CAN)	1	1
Luis Olivares (VEN)	1	0
Antoine Jaoude (BRA)	0
Jesse Ruíz (MEX)	4^{F}

Final
Arjan Bhullar (CAN)	1	1
Jesse Ruíz (MEX)	0	0

Bronze medals
Bye
Luis Olivares (VEN)
Edgardo López (PUR)	0	0
Antoine Jaoude (BRA)	5	3

== Men's Greco-Roman ==
=== 55 kg ===
23 March

Pos	Athlete	Pld	W	L	CP	TP	CUB	USA	COL	ECU
1	Javier Duménigo (CUB)	3	3	0	9	8	—	1–0, 1–0	1–0, 2–0	2–1, 1–0
2	Spenser Mango (USA)	3	2	1	6	8	0–3 PO	—	1–0, 1–0	5–0, 1–0
3	Andrés Taborda (COL)	3	1	2	3	10	0–3 PO	0–3 PO	—	3–0, 7–0
4	Jefferson Mayea (ECU)	3	0	3	1	1	1–3 PP	0–3 PO	0–3 PO	—

Source: UWW

=== 60 kg ===
23 March

Round of 16
Diego Romanelli (BRA)	7	6
Juan Carlos López (COL)	0	5

Quarterfinals
Manuel López (MEX)	0	2^{F}
Moisés Soto (PAN)	1	2
Paul Sobrado (PER)	0	0
Hanser Meoque (CUB)	1	6
Andrés Montaño (ECU)	0	0
Jansel Ramírez (DOM)	1	1
Ellis Coleman (USA)	6	6
Diego Romanelli (BRA)	0	0

Semifinals
Manuel López (MEX)	0	0
Hanser Meoque (CUB)	4	2
Jansel Ramírez (DOM)	0	0
Ellis Coleman (USA)	6	1

Final
Hanser Meoque (CUB)	4	1
Ellis Coleman (USA)	0	0

Bronze medals
Paul Sobrado (PER)	4	1	5
Manuel López (MEX)	7	0	0
Diego Romanelli (BRA)	0	0
Jansel Ramírez (DOM)	1	1

=== 66 kg ===
23 March

Quarterfinals
Orlando Huacón (ECU)	2	4
Jack Bond (CAN)	0	1
Ângelo Moreira (BRA)	5	0	0
Ulises Barragán (MEX)	0	7	7
Wuileixis Rivas (VEN)	2	6
Francisco Barrio (ARG)	0	0
Daniel Soto (PUR)	0	0
Iván Duque (COL)	1	2

Semifinals
Orlando Huacón (ECU)	3	1
Ulises Barragán (MEX)	0	0
Wuileixis Rivas (VEN)	2	5
Iván Duque (COL)	1	1

Final
Orlando Huacón (ECU)	4	1
Wuileixis Rivas (VEN)	0	0

Bronze medals
Jack Bond (CAN)	0	0
Ulises Barragán (MEX)	7	9
Francisco Barrio (ARG)	0	0
Iván Duque (COL)	1	7

=== 74 kg ===
23 March

Quarterfinals			Semifinals			Final
Jorgisbell Álvarez (CUB)	4	3^{F}
Juan Ángel Escobar (MEX)	2	0	Jorgisbell Álvarez (CUB)	2	4
Shawn Daye-Finley (CAN)	0	0	Sixto Barrera (PER)	0	2
Sixto Barrera (PER)	1	4				Jorgisbell Álvarez (CUB)	3	1
Andy Bisek (USA)	2	1				Andy Bisek (USA)	0	0
Alvis Almendra (PAN)	0	0	Andy Bisek (USA)	3	2
Luillys Pérez (VEN)	1	1	Luillys Pérez (VEN)	0	0
Maximiliano Prudenzano (ARG)	0	0

Bronze medals
Juan Ángel Escobar (MEX)	0	0
Sixto Barrera (PER)	3	1
Alvis Almendra (PAN)	0	0
Luillys Pérez (VEN)	1	2

=== 84 kg ===
23 March

Quarterfinals
Cristian Mosquera (COL)	3	0
Pablo Shorey (CUB)	5	1
Yorgen Cova (VEN)	1	2
Eric Feunekes (CAN)	0	0

Semifinals
José Antonio Arias (DOM)	0	0
Chas Betts (USA)	1	4
Pablo Shorey (CUB)	1	1
Yorgen Cova (VEN)	0	0

Final
Chas Betts (USA)	0	0
Pablo Shorey (CUB)	1	3

Bronze medals
Bye
José Antonio Arias (DOM)
Cristian Mosquera (COL)	1	1
Yorgen Cova (VEN)	0	0

=== 96 kg ===
23 March

Quarterfinals
Yunior Estrada (CUB)	2	6
Raúl Angulo (COL)	0	0
Justin Ruiz (USA)	7	1
Yuri Maier (ARG)	1	0
Erwin Caraballo (VEN)	0	1	1
Korey Jarvis (CAN)	1	0	0
Randy Lambert (HON)	0	0
Davi Albino (BRA)	1	1

Semifinals
Yunior Estrada (CUB)	2	2
Justin Ruiz (USA)	0	0
Erwin Caraballo (VEN)	0	1	1
Davi Albino (BRA)	1	0	0

Final
Yunior Estrada (CUB)	1	3
Erwin Caraballo (VEN)	0	0

Bronze medals
Raúl Angulo (COL)	0	0
Justin Ruiz (USA)	1	6
Korey Jarvis (CAN)	0	1	3^{F}
Davi Albino (BRA)	4	0	0

=== 120 kg ===
24 March

Quarterfinals
Andrés Ayub (CHI)	2	1
Edgardo López (PUR)	0	0
Víctor Asprilla (COL)	0	1	0
Antoine Jaoude (BRA)	1	0	2
Sunny Dhinsa (CAN)	0	0
Dremiel Byers (USA)	1	3
Ramón García (DOM)	3	1
Rafael Barreno (VEN)	0	0

Semifinals
Andrés Ayub (CHI)	2	1
Antoine Jaoude (BRA)	1	0
Dremiel Byers (USA)	2	1
Ramón García (DOM)	0	0

Final
Andrés Ayub (CHI)	0	0
Dremiel Byers (USA)	2	2

Bronze medals
Edgardo López (PUR)	0	0
Antoine Jaoude (BRA)	6	2
Sunny Dhinsa (CAN)	0	0
Ramón García (DOM)	5	1

== Women's freestyle ==
=== 48 kg ===
24 March

Quarterfinals
Clarissa Chun (USA)	7	7
Katiuska Toaza (ECU)	0	0
Susana Almeida (BRA)	0	0
Jazmín Martínez (MEX)	1	1

Semifinals
Mayelis Caripá (VEN)	0	1
Patricia Bermúdez (ARG)	1	2
Clarissa Chun (USA)	8	7
Jazmín Martínez (MEX)	2	0

Final
Patricia Bermúdez (ARG)	1	0
Clarissa Chun (USA)	8	6

Bronze medals
Bye
Mayelis Caripá (VEN)
Katiuska Toaza (ECU)	1	0	1
Jazmín Martínez (MEX)	0	1	0

=== 55 kg ===
24 March

Quarterfinals
Joice Silva (BRA)	1	0
Lissette Antes (ECU)	1	2
Yamilka del Valle (CUB)	W	O
Romina González (ARG)
Jenny Mallqui (PER)	1	0	0
Marcia Andrades (VEN)	0	1	1
Alma Valencia (MEX)	5	1
Leidy Cifuentes (COL)	3	0

Semifinals
Lissette Antes (ECU)	1	2	4
Yamilka del Valle (CUB)	1	1	0
Marcia Andrades (VEN)	4^{F}
Alma Valencia (MEX)	0

Final
Lissette Antes (ECU)
Marcia Andrades (VEN)	W	O

Bronze medals
Joice Silva (BRA)	7	2
Yamilka del Valle (CUB)	0	1
Jenny Mallqui (PER)	1	0
Alma Valencia (MEX)	1	2

=== 63 kg ===
24 March

Quarterfinals
Yanet Sovero (PER)	3^{F}
Gloria Zavala (VEN)	1
Katerina Vidiaux (CUB)	6	6
Luz Vázquez (ARG)	0	0
Martine Dugrenier (CAN)	1	2
Sandra Roa (COL)	1	2
Dailane Reis (BRA)	5^{F}
Wendy García (MEX)	0

Semifinals
Yanet Sovero (PER)	0	4	0
Katerina Vidiaux (CUB)	2	2	3
Martine Dugrenier (CAN)	7	7
Dailane Reis (BRA)	1	0

Final
Katerina Vidiaux (CUB)
Martine Dugrenier (CAN)	W	O

Bronze medals
Luz Vázquez (ARG)	1	1
Yanet Sovero (PER)	1	0
Sandra Roa (COL)	0	4^{F}
Dailane Reis (BRA)	3	0

=== 72 kg ===
24 March

Quarterfinals
Leah Callahan (CAN)	4^{F}
Jaramit Weffer (VEN)	0
Lisset Hechevarría (CUB)	3	2
Aline Ferreira (BRA)	0	0

Semifinals
Ana Talía Betancur (COL)	3	0	3
Diana Miranda (MEX)	0	1	2
Leah Callahan (CAN)	1	1
Lisset Hechevarría (CUB)	0	0

Final
Ana Talía Betancur (COL)	0	0
Leah Callahan (CAN)	1	4^{F}

Bronze medals
Bye
Diana Miranda (MEX)
Jaramit Weffer (VEN)
Lisset Hechevarría (CUB)	W	O
