= 2009 World Wrestling Championships – Men's freestyle 120 kg =

Men's freestyle 120 kg at the 2009 World Championships
- Venue: Messecenter Herning
- Dates: 22 September 2009
- Competitors: 27 from 27 nations

Medalists
gold medal	Bilyal Makhov	Russia
silver medal	Fardin Masoumi	Iran
bronze medal	Ioannis Arzoumanidis	Greece
bronze medal	Tervel Dlagnev	United States

The men's freestyle 120 kilograms is a competition featured at the 2009 World Wrestling Championships, and was held at the Messecenter Herning exhibition center in Herning, Denmark on September 22.

This freestyle wrestling competition consists of a single-elimination tournament, with a repechage used to determine the winner of two bronze medals.

== Results ==
Legend

- F — Won by fall

=== Final ===
Final
Bilyal Makhov (RUS)	2	6
Fardin Masoumi (IRI)	0	0

=== Top half ===
Round of 32
Disney Rodríguez (CUB)	1	1
Sergejs Djomins (LAT)	0	0
Joginder Kumar (IND)	0	2
Bartłomiej Bartnicki (POL)	2	4
Dimitar Kumchev (BUL)	1	3
Jargalsaikhany Chuluunbat (MGL)	0	3

Round of 16
Bilyal Makhov (RUS)	2	2
Ioannis Arzoumanidis (GRE)	0	0
José Cuba (ESP)	2	8
Andrei Podsevalnicov (MDA)	0	2
Bazarbay Utambetov (UZB)	0	0
Disney Rodríguez (CUB)	2	4
Bartłomiej Bartnicki (POL)	2	0	2
Dimitar Kumchev (BUL)	0	3	1

Quarterfinals
Bilyal Makhov (RUS)	6	6
José Cuba (ESP)	0	0
Disney Rodríguez (CUB)	2	0	2
Bartłomiej Bartnicki (POL)	0	3	0

Semifinals
Bilyal Makhov (RUS)	4	6
Disney Rodríguez (CUB)	0	0

=== Bottom half ===
Round of 32
Juszup Nunajev (HUN)	0	0
Tervel Dlagnev (USA)	1	2
Song Shitao (CHN)	0	0
Aleksey Shemarov (BLR)	4	7^{F}
Vasyl Tesmynetskyi (UKR)	0	0
Marid Mutalimov (KAZ)	2	1
Yonsi Sánchez (VEN)	0	0
Ali Isayev (AZE)	1	1
Recep Kara (TUR)	7	4
Nobuyoshi Arakida (JPN)	0	0
Fardin Masoumi (IRI)	1	0	1
Alex Modebadze (GEO)	0	1	0
Ruslan Basiev (ARM)	0	0
Arjan Bhullar (CAN)	1	2
Yahya Abdul-Kareem (IRQ)	2	2
Lawrence Langowski (MEX)	0	0

Round of 16
Tervel Dlagnev (USA)	3	2^{F}
Aleksey Shemarov (BLR)	0	0
Marid Mutalimov (KAZ)	0	0
Ali Isayev (AZE)	2	1
Recep Kara (TUR)	0	0
Fardin Masoumi (IRI)	1	1
Arjan Bhullar (CAN)	1	2
Yahya Abdul-Kareem (IRQ)	0	0

Quarterfinals
Tervel Dlagnev (USA)	1	4
Ali Isayev (AZE)	0	0
Fardin Masoumi (IRI)	1	3
Arjan Bhullar (CAN)	0	0

Semifinals
Tervel Dlagnev (USA)	0	0
Fardin Masoumi (IRI)	1	1

=== Repechage ===
Repechage round 1
Alex Modebadze (GEO)	1	0	1
Recep Kara (TUR)	0	1	0

Repechage round 2
Ioannis Arzoumanidis (GRE)	6	2
José Cuba (ESP)	3	0
Alex Modebadze (GEO)	1	1
Arjan Bhullar (CAN)	0	0

Bronze medals
Ioannis Arzoumanidis (GRE)	0	3	1
Disney Rodríguez (CUB)	1	0	0
Alex Modebadze (GEO)	0	0
Tervel Dlagnev (USA)	2	2
