= 2011 World Wrestling Championships – Men's freestyle 120 kg =

Men's freestyle 120 kg at the 2011 World Championships
- Venue: Sinan Erdem Dome
- Dates: 18 September 2011
- Competitors: 31 from 31 nations

Medalists
gold medal	Aleksey Shemarov	Belarus
silver medal	Bilyal Makhov	Russia
bronze medal	Jamaladdin Magomedov	Azerbaijan
bronze medal	Davit Modzmanashvili	Georgia

The men's freestyle 120 kilograms is a competition featured at the 2011 World Wrestling Championships, and was held at the Sinan Erdem Dome in Istanbul, Turkey on 18 September 2011.

This freestyle wrestling competition featured a single-elimination format, with a repechage match to determine the winners of the two bronze medals.

== Results ==
Legend

- F — Won by fall

=== Final ===
Final
Bilyal Makhov (RUS)	0	0
Aleksey Shemarov (BLR)	1	1

=== Top half ===
Round of 32
Antoine Jaoude (BRA)	0	0
Deng Zhiwei (CHN)	1	3
Jamaladdin Magomedov (AZE)	6	3
Dániel Ligeti (HUN)	3	2
Dimitar Kumchev (BUL)	7	3^{F}
Zayed Al-Kaabi (UAE)	0	0
Ioannis Arzoumanidis (GRE)	1	0	1
Arjan Bhullar (CAN)	0	1	0
Andrei Podsevalnicov (MDA)	0	4
Fatjon Baro (ALB)	3	3^{F}
Jargalsaikhany Chuluunbat (MGL)	0	1
Bilyal Makhov (RUS)	1	4
Florian Skilang Temengil (PLW)	0	0
Ruslan Basiev (ARM)	2	6

Round of 16
Rareș Chintoan (ROU)	0	0
Deng Zhiwei (CHN)	1	1
Jamaladdin Magomedov (AZE)	3	6
Dimitar Kumchev (BUL)	0	0
Ioannis Arzoumanidis (GRE)	3	1
Fatjon Baro (ALB)	2	0
Bilyal Makhov (RUS)	1	1
Ruslan Basiev (ARM)	0	0

Quarterfinals
Deng Zhiwei (CHN)	0	0
Jamaladdin Magomedov (AZE)	1	4
Ioannis Arzoumanidis (GRE)	0	1
Bilyal Makhov (RUS)	1	2

Semifinals
Jamaladdin Magomedov (AZE)	1	1	1
Bilyal Makhov (RUS)	0	1	4

=== Bottom half ===
Round of 32
Disney Rodríguez (CUB)	1	1
Bartłomiej Bartnicki (POL)	0	0
Artur Taymazov (UZB)	7	5
José Cuba (ESP)	0	0
Muradyn Kushkhov (UKR)	0	0
Marid Mutalimov (KAZ)	1	1
Tervel Dlagnev (USA)	3	4
Aiaal Lazarev (KGZ)	0	0
Aleksey Shemarov (BLR)	3	3
Nick Matuhin (GER)	0	2
Dmitrijs Mihailovs (LAT)	0	0
Fatih Çakıroğlu (TUR)	7	6
Rajiv Tomar (IND)	0	0
Nobuyoshi Arakida (JPN)	4	1
Davit Modzmanashvili (GEO)	1	3	1
Fardin Masoumi (IRI)	3	0	1

Round of 16
Disney Rodríguez (CUB)	0	1
Artur Taymazov (UZB)	1	4
Marid Mutalimov (KAZ)	1	0	0
Tervel Dlagnev (USA)	0	1	1
Aleksey Shemarov (BLR)	1	0	3
Fatih Çakıroğlu (TUR)	0	1	0
Nobuyoshi Arakida (JPN)	0	0
Davit Modzmanashvili (GEO)	1	7

Quarterfinals
Artur Taymazov (UZB)	1	1	0
Tervel Dlagnev (USA)	0	2	1
Aleksey Shemarov (BLR)	1	0	2
Davit Modzmanashvili (GEO)	0	1	0

Semifinals
Tervel Dlagnev (USA)	0	0
Aleksey Shemarov (BLR)	1	1

=== Repechage ===
Repechage round 1
Jargalsaikhany Chuluunbat (MGL)	0	2	3
Ruslan Basiev (ARM)	1	0	0
Nick Matuhin (GER)	0	0
Fatih Çakıroğlu (TUR)	2	4^{F}

Repechage round 2
Jargalsaikhany Chuluunbat (MGL)	3	4
Ioannis Arzoumanidis (GRE)	0	0
Fatih Çakıroğlu (TUR)	0	0
Davit Modzmanashvili (GEO)	1	1

Bronze medals
Jargalsaikhany Chuluunbat (MGL)	0	0
Jamaladdin Magomedov (AZE)	1	1
Davit Modzmanashvili (GEO)	1	0	1
Tervel Dlagnev (USA)	0	1	0
