= Jargalsaikhany Chuluunbat =

Mongolian freestyle wrestler

Jargalsaikhany Chuluunbat ᠵᠢᠷᠭᠠᠯᠰᠠᠶᠢᠬᠠᠨ ᠴᠢᠯᠠᠭᠤᠨᠪᠠᠲᠤ
Personal information
- Native name: Жаргалсайхан Чулуунбат
- Nationality: Mongolia
- Born: 3 December 1984 (age 41) Buutsagaan, Bayankhongor, Mongolia
- Employer: General Executive Agency for Court Decision Enforcement
- Height: 184 cm (6 ft 0 in)

Sport
- Country: Mongolia
- Sport: Wrestling
- Weight class: 125 kg
- Rank: State Falcon ( Mongolian Wrestling); International Master of Sports (Freestyle Wrestling)
- Event: Freestyle
- Club: Suld Sports Committee; Terguun Bogd Wrestling Club; Negdel Wrestling Club

Achievements and titles
- Olympic finals: 5th (2012)
- World finals: 5th (2011) 5th (2015)
Medal record
Men's freestyle wrestling
Representing Mongolia
Asian Games
Silver medal – second place	2010 Guangzhou	120 kg
Asian Championships
Silver medal – second place	2010 New Delhi	120 kg
Silver medal – second place	2013 New Delhi	120 kg
Bronze medal – third place	2008 Jeju City	120 kg
Bronze medal – third place	2011 Tashkent	120 kg
Bronze medal – third place	2012 Gumi	120 kg
Golden Grand Prix Ivan Yarygin
Bronze medal – third place	2015 Krasnoyarsk	125 kg

Jargalsaikhany Chuluunbat (Mongolian: Жаргалсайханы Чулуунбат; born 3 December 1984, in Bayankhongor Province) is a Mongolian freestyle wrestler. He competed in the freestyle 120 kg event at the 2012 Summer Olympics and in the freestyle 125 kg event at the 2016 Summer Olympics; he defeated Malal Ndiaye in the 1/8 finals and was eliminated by Bilyal Makhov in the quarterfinals. He is also a Mongolian traditional wrestler who holds the rank of State Falcon.

== Olympic results ==
2012 (as a men's freestyle 120 kg)

=== Match 1 ===
Team	Round 1	Round 2	Round 3
Jargalsaikhany Chuluunbat (MGL)	1	2	
Malal Ndiaye (SEN)	0	0	

=== Match 2 ===
Team	Round 1	Round 2	Round 3
Jargalsaikhany Chuluunbat (MGL)	6	1	0
Bilyal Makhov (RUS)	0	2	1

He was excluded from men's freestyle 120 kilograms competition at the 2012 Summer Olympics in favor of Bilyal Makhov according to special criteria for determining the winner.

After the doping scandal Jargalsaikhany Chuluunbat upgraded to fifth place of the 2012 Summer Olympics in 2020.

Rank	Athlete
1st place, gold medalist(s)	Komeil Ghasemi (IRI)
1st place, gold medalist(s)	Bilyal Makhov (RUS)
3rd place, bronze medalist(s)	Tervel Dlagnev (USA)
3rd place, bronze medalist(s)	Daulet Shabanbay (KAZ)
5	Jargalsaikhany Chuluunbat (MGL)
