= Wrestling at the 2012 Summer Olympics – Men's freestyle 120 kg =

Men's freestyle 120 kg at the Games of the XXX Olympiad
- Venue: ExCeL London
- Date: 11 August 2012
- Competitors: 18 from 18 nations

Medalists
1st place, gold medalist(s)		Komeil Ghasemi	Iran
1st place, gold medalist(s)		Bilyal Makhov	Russia
3rd place, bronze medalist(s)		Tervel Dlagnev	United States
3rd place, bronze medalist(s)		Daulet Shabanbay	Kazakhstan

Men's freestyle 120 kilograms competition at the 2012 Summer Olympics in London, United Kingdom, took place on 11 August at ExCeL London. This freestyle wrestling competition consisted of a single-elimination tournament, with a repechage used to determine the winners of two bronze medals. The two finalists faced off for gold and silver medals. Each wrestler who lost to one of the two finalists moved into the repechage, culminating in a pair of bronze medal matches featuring the semifinal losers each facing the remaining repechage opponent from their half of the bracket.

Each bout consisted of up to three rounds, lasting two minutes apiece. The wrestler who scored more points in each round was the winner of that rounds; the bout finished when one wrestler had won two rounds (and thus the match).

China's Liang Lei was on the start list but did not compete due to injury.

In January 2019, Georgia's Davit Modzmanashvili, who originally won the silver medal, was disqualified after testing positive for banned substances. On 23 July 2019, it was announced that as a result of retesting samples, original gold medalist Artur Taymazov was also disqualified.

Consequently, the original bronze medalists, Komeil Ghasemi of Iran and Bilyal Makhov of Russia, were declared joint Olympic champions, while Tervel Dlagnev of the United States and Daulet Shabanbay of Kazakhstan, who Ghasemi and Makhov had defeated in the repechage, were awarded the bronze medals.

== Schedule ==
All times are British Summer Time (UTC+01:00)

Date	Time	Event
11 August 2012	13:00	Qualification rounds
11 August 2012	17:45	Repechage
11 August 2012	18:30	Finals

== Results ==
Legend

- F — Won by fall

=== Final ===
Final
Artur Taymazov (UZB)	1	1
Davit Modzmanashvili (GEO)	0	0

=== Top half ===
Qualifications

1/8 finals
Tervel Dlagnev (USA)	6	1
El-Desoky Ismail (EGY)	2	0
Aleksey Shemarov (BLR)	2	2
Dániel Ligeti (HUN)	0	1
Nick Matuhin (GER)	0	0
Artur Taymazov (UZB)	4	2
Komeil Ghasemi (IRI)	1	1
Arjan Bhullar (CAN)	0	0

1/4 finals
Tervel Dlagnev (USA)	2	3
Aleksey Shemarov (BLR)	0	1
Artur Taymazov (UZB)	1	1
Komeil Ghasemi (IRI)	0	0

Semifinals
Tervel Dlagnev (USA)	0
Artur Taymazov (UZB)	3^{F}

=== Bottom half ===
Qualifications
Oleksandr Khotsianivskyi (UKR)	0	0
Taha Akgül (TUR)	1	2
Bilyal Makhov (RUS)	1	4
Jamaladdin Magomedov (AZE)	0	0

1/8 finals
Davit Modzmanashvili (GEO)	4	7
Jesse Ruíz (MEX)	0	0
Rareș Chintoan (ROU)	3	2	0
Daulet Shabanbay (KAZ)	0	5	1
Malal Ndiaye (SEN)	0	0
Jargalsaikhany Chuluunbat (MGL)	1	2
Taha Akgül (TUR)	0	0
Bilyal Makhov (RUS)	1	3

1/4 finals
Davit Modzmanashvili (GEO)	4	1
Daulet Shabanbay (KAZ)	0	0
Jargalsaikhany Chuluunbat (MGL)	6	1	0
Bilyal Makhov (RUS)	0	2	1

Semifinals
Davit Modzmanashvili (GEO)	1	1
Bilyal Makhov (RUS)	0	1

=== Repechage ===
Repechage round 2
Nick Matuhin (GER)	0	0
Komeil Ghasemi (IRI)	1	1
Jesse Ruíz (MEX)	0	0
Daulet Shabanbay (KAZ)	5	3^{F}

Bronze medals
Komeil Ghasemi (IRI)	4	0	1
Tervel Dlagnev (USA)	0	1	0
Daulet Shabanbay (KAZ)	0	3	0
Bilyal Makhov (RUS)	5	0	3

== Final standing ==
Rank	Athlete
1st place, gold medalist(s)	Komeil Ghasemi (IRI)
1st place, gold medalist(s)	Bilyal Makhov (RUS)
3rd place, bronze medalist(s)	Tervel Dlagnev (USA)
3rd place, bronze medalist(s)	Daulet Shabanbay (KAZ)
5	Jargalsaikhany Chuluunbat (MGL)
6	Aleksey Shemarov (BLR)
7	Taha Akgül (TUR)
8	Rareș Chintoan (ROU)
9	El-Desoky Ismail (EGY)
10	Dániel Ligeti (HUN)
11	Arjan Bhullar (CAN)
12	Oleksandr Khotsianivskyi (UKR)
12	Malal Ndiaye (SEN)
14	Jamaladdin Magomedov (AZE)
15	Nick Matuhin (GER)
16	Jesse Ruíz (MEX)
DQ	Artur Taymazov (UZB)
DQ	Davit Modzmanashvili (GEO)

- Artur Taymazov of Uzbekistan originally won the gold medal, but was disqualified after he tested positive for Chlorodehydromethyltestosterone.
- Davit Modzmanashvili of Georgia originally won the silver medal, but was disqualified after he tested positive for Chlorodehydromethyltestosterone.
