= El-Desoky Ismail =

Egyptian freestyle wrestler

El-Desoki Ismail
Personal information
- Full name: El-Desoky Ismail Abdulraouf; Muhammad Shaban
- Nationality: Egypt
- Born: 1 January 1983 (age 43) Kafr el-Sheikh, Egypt
- Height: 1.85 m (6 ft 1 in)
- Weight: 120 kg (265 lb)

Sport
- Sport: Wrestling
- Event: Freestyle

El-Desoky Ismail Abdulraouf Muhammad Shaban (also El-Desoki Ismail, Arabic: الدسوقي إسماعيل عبد الرؤف محمد شعبان; born January 1, 1983, in Kafr el-Sheikh) is an amateur Egyptian freestyle wrestler, who played for the men's super heavyweight category. Ismail represented Egypt at the 2012 Summer Olympics in London, where he competed for the men's 120 kg class. He received a bye for the preliminary round of sixteen match, before losing out to U.S. wrestler Tervel Dlagnev, with a two-set technical score (2–6, 0–1), and a classification point score of 1–3.
