= Jesse Ruíz =

American-born wrestler (born 1985)

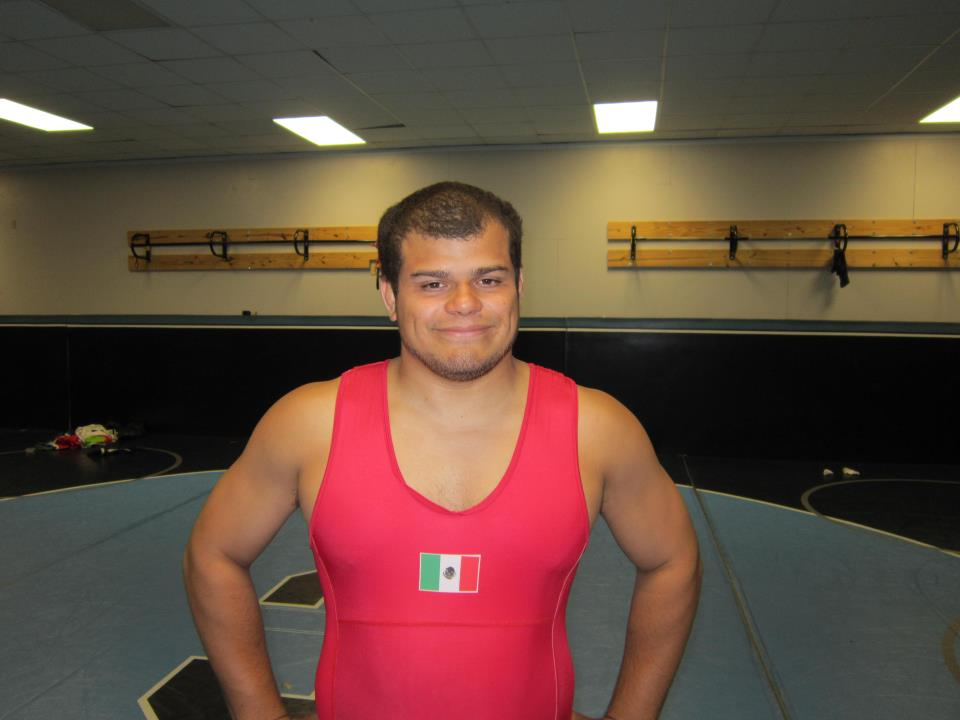
- Ruíz in 2012

Personal information
- Full name: Jesse Prudente Ruíz Flores
- Nationality: Mexico; United States
- Born: 31 July 1985 (age 40) Santa Ana, California, U.S.
- Height: 1.80 m (5 ft 11 in)
- Weight: 97 kg (214 lb)

Sport
- Style: Freestyle; Folkstyle
- Club: Club Alpha Omega (MEX)
Medal record
Men's freestyle wrestling
Representing Mexico
Pan American Games
Bronze medal – third place	2015 Toronto	97 kg
Collegiate Wrestling
Representing the Menlo Oaks
NAIA Championships
Gold medal – first place	2008 Sioux City	285 lb
Bronze medal – third place	2009 Oklahoma City	285 lb

Jesse Prudente Ruíz Flores (born July 31, 1985) is an American-born wrestler, who represented Mexico, and competed in the men's freestyle 120 kg (heavyweight division) at the 2012 Summer Olympics in London.

== Wrestling career ==
Ruíz, the eldest in the family of six, was born and raised in Santa Ana, California by Mexican immigrants. He began wrestling in his sophomore year at Santa Ana Valley High School, and placed seventh in the heavyweight division at the national state high school championships. Ruíz continued his sporting career upon his admission at Santa Ana College, where he became a two-time All-American champion in 2003 and in 2004. In both years, he also finished second in the same division at the California Community College Athletic Association state finals. Following his career at Santa Ana College, Ruíz transferred to Menlo College in Atherton, California, and spent for three years (2007–2009) in the wrestling team, competing in the heavyweight division. In 2008, he became a National Association of Intercollegiate Athletics (NAIA) champion, and in the following year, he claimed his third championship title in the All-American division.

After graduating from Menlo College in 2010, Ruíz was recruited to Alpha Omega Wrestling Club in Mexico City, Mexico, to compete and represent his parents' birth nation. At the peak of his sporting career in Mexico, he became a three-time national champion, and won a silver medal at the 2010 Pan American Wrestling Championships in Rionegro, Colombia. Ruíz also represented the host nation at the 2011 Pan American Games in Guadalajara, where he was defeated by Cuba's Disney Rodríguez in the quarterfinal round, without receiving a technical score. Despite his sudden loss at the Pan American Games, Ruíz had granted his qualifying place to represent Mexico at the 2012 Summer Olympics in London after winning silver for the men's heavyweight division at the FILA Pan American Olympic Games Qualifying Tournament in Orlando, Florida.

At the Olympics, Ruíz competed in the men's heavyweight division in freestyle wrestling, where he was eliminated in the first round, after being defeated by Georgia's Davit Modzmanashvili. Because his opponent reached the final, and eventually won the silver medal, Ruíz had a chance to qualify for an Olympic bronze medal via a repechage bout; however, he lost to Kazakhstan's Daulet Shabanbay in the first repechage round, because of his opponent's technical fall.

Ruíz has been actively working as a voluntary assistant wrestling coach at The Citadel in Charleston, South Carolina.
