= Wrestling at the 2006 Central American and Caribbean Games =

- Location: Cartagena

The Wrestling competition at the 2006 Central American and Caribbean Games was held in Cartagena, Colombia.

== Medal summary ==
=== Men's events ===
Event	Gold	Silver	Bronze
Greco-Roman 55 kg	Lázaro Rivas (CUB)	Jansel Ramírez (DOM)	Jorge Cardoso (VEN); Julio Muñoz (COL)
Greco-Roman 60 kg	Luis Liendo (VEN)	Roberto Monzón (CUB)	Iván Duque (COL); Milton Bailey (GUA)
Greco-Roman 66 kg	Maili Consuegra (CUB)	Anyelo Mota (DOM)	Endrix Arteaga (VEN); Julio Cuenu (COL)
Greco-Roman 74 kg	Odelis Herrero (CUB)	Jarlis Mosquera (COL)	Edwin Abreu (DOM); Elton Brown (PAN)
Greco-Roman 84 kg	José Arias (DOM)	Eddy Bartolozzy (VEN)	Samuel Arroyo (PAN); Cristhian Mosquera (COL)
Greco-Roman 96 kg	Luis Talavera (VEN)	Alain Rivas (CUB)	Alexis Rodríguez (CUB); Manuel Simonó (DOM)
Freestyle 55 kg	René Montero (CUB)	Freddy Serrano (COL)	Luis Portillo (ESA); José González (GUA)
Freestyle 60 kg	Yandro Quintana (CUB)	Aneudy Navarro (DOM)	Vladimir Hernández (VEN); Nelson García (COL)
Freestyle 66 kg	Geandry Garzón (CUB)	Ricardo Roberty (VEN)	Edison Hurtado (COL); Pedro Soto (PUR)
Freestyle 74 kg	Serguei Rondón (CUB)	Máximo Blanco (VEN)	Richard Ramos (DOM); Leonardo González (PAN)
Freestyle 84 kg	Roerlandy Zúñiga (CUB)	Rosmer Gil (VEN)	Manuel García (PUR); Rodrigo Piedrahita (COL)
Freestyle 96 kg	Michel Batista (CUB)	Mathew White (PUR)	Luis Vivenes (VEN); Arnulfo Hernández (COL)
Freestyle 120 kg	Disney Rodríguez (CUB)	Alfredo Far (PAN)	Gamalier Coats (DOM); Edgar Becerra (VEN)

=== Women's events ===
Event	Gold	Silver	Bronze
Freestyle 48 kg	Mayelis Caripá (VEN)	Maryuri Valencia (COL)	Guadalupe Pérez (MEX); Massiel Jiménez (DOM)
Freestyle 51 kg	María Sarmiento (VEN)	Reina Paulino (DOM)	Enid Rivera (PUR); Yamilca del Valle (CUB)
Freestyle 55 kg	Sandra Roa (COL)	Sheila Espinosa (CUB)	Lil Canales (ESA); Marcia Andrades (VEN)
Freestyle 59 kg	Yóselin Rojas (VEN)	Mabel Fonseca (PUR)	Yagnelis Mestre (CUB); Virginia Mendoza (MEX)
Freestyle 63 kg	Yaritza Abel (CUB)	Sandra Amado (COL)	Ana González (VEN)
Freestyle 67 kg	Liset Echevarría (CUB)	Jaresmit Weffer (VEN)	Verónica Lazo (ESA)
