= Joe Betterman =

American wrestler (born 1984)

Personal information
- Full name: Joseph Samuel Betterman
- Born: July 12, 1984 (age 42) Chicago, Illinois, U.S.

Sport
- Country: United States
- Sport: Wrestling
- Event: Greco-Roman
- College team: Northern Michigan
- Club: USOEC
- Team: USA
- Coached by: Ivan Ivanov
Medal record
Men's Greco-Roman wrestling
Representing the United States
Pan American Games
Silver medal – second place	2011 Guadalajara	60 kg

Joseph Samuel Betterman (born July 12, 1984) is an American former Greco-Roman wrestler. Betterman represented the United States at the World Championships in Greco-Roman at 60 kg in 2007 and 2011. He was a member of the 2007 United States Greco-Roman World Champion Team. Betterman was also a silver medalist at the 2011 Pan American Games at 60 kg.

== Wrestling career ==
Betterman attended Lake View High School in Chicago, Illinois. As a folkstyle wrestler at Lake View, he finished sixth at the 2002 Illinois state tournament and was a state qualifier in 2001.

He finished fifth at the 2001 Junior Nationals in Greco-Roman, earning All-American honors. Betterman attended the U.S. Olympic Education Center at Northern Michigan University, where he focused on Greco-Roman wrestling. While at Northern Michigan, he was coached by Ivan Ivanov, a Bulgarian Olympian in Greco-Roman wrestling.

Betterman represented the United States in Greco-Roman at the 2007 World Championships in the 60 kg weight class. At the 2007 World Championships, the United States won their first ever Greco-Roman team title.

In 2011, he again represented the United States at the 2011 World Championships in Greco-Roman at 60 kg, and that same year, won a silver medal at the Pan American Games.
