= Malal Ndiaye =

Senegalese freestyle wrestler

Malal Ndiaye (born 12 January 1977 in Dakar) is a Senegalese freestyle wrestler. He competed in the freestyle 120 kg event at the 2012 Summer Olympics and was eliminated by Jargalsaikhany Chuluunbat in the 1/8 finals.
