= Tervel Dlagnev =

Bulgarian-American freestyle wrestler

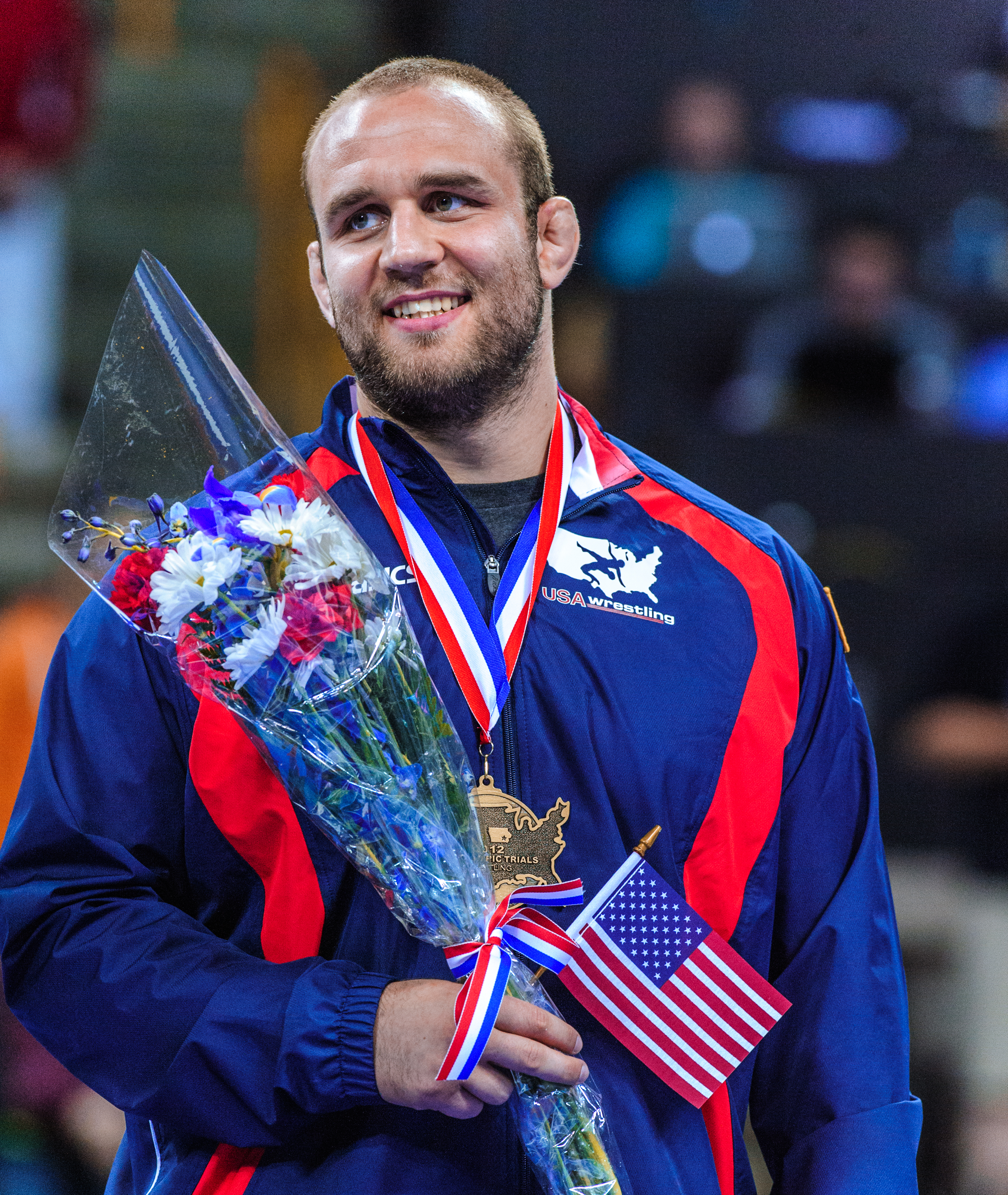
- 2012 USA Wrestling Olympic Team Trials

Personal information
- Nationality: American
- Born: November 19, 1985 (age 40) Sofia, Bulgaria
- Home town: Arlington, Texas, U.S.
- Height: 6 ft 3 in (191 cm)
- Weight: 125 kg (276 lb)

Sport
- Sport: Freestyle wrestling
- College team: Nebraska–Kearney Lopers
- Club: Sunkist Kids Wrestling Club
- Coached by: Henry Harmony. Marc Bauer; Lou Rosselli
Medal record
Men's freestyle wrestling
Representing the United States
Olympic Games
Bronze medal – third place	2012 London	120 kg
World Championships
Bronze medal – third place	Herning 2009	120 kg
Bronze medal – third place	Tashkent 2014	125 kg
Pan American Games
Gold medal – first place	2011 Guadalajara	120 kg
Golden Grand Prix Ivan Yarygin
Silver medal – second place	2012 Krasnoyarsk	125 kg
Bronze medal – third place	2011 Krasnoyarsk	125 kg
Alexander Medved International
Gold medal – first place	2010 Minsk	125 kg
Gold medal – first place	2013 Minsk	125 kg
Bronze medal – third place	2011 Minsk	125 kg
World University Championships
Gold medal – first place	2008 Thessaloniki	120 kg
Men's collegiate wrestling
Representing Nebraska-Kearney
NCAA Division II Championships
Gold medal – first place	2007 Kearney	285 lb
Gold medal – first place	2008 Cedar Rapids	285 lb
Silver medal – second place	2006 Findlay	285 lb

Tervel Ivaylov Dlagnev (Bulgarian: Тервел Ивайлов Длагнев, born November 19, 1985) is an American freestyle wrestler, who represented the United States in the 125 kg weight division. He earned a bronze medal at the 2012 Olympic Games in London, and finished 5th at the 2016 Olympic Games in Rio.

== Early life ==
Dlagnev was born in Bulgaria, and at the age of four, moved with his family to the United States. He went to Arlington High School in Arlington, Texas, where he took up wrestling as a way to lose weight. Dlagnev only wrestled three years in high school, where he finished fourth and third at the Texas state championships in 2002 and 2003.

== College career ==
Dlagnev was a four-time All-American and a two-time NCAA Division II national champion in the heavyweight division for the University of Nebraska at Kearney (UNK) in 2007 and 2008. In 2008, Dlagnev led UNK to their first ever team national title and helped recruit Kamaru Usman to UNK. His win secured the national championship not just for himself, but also for the University of Nebraska at Kearney wrestling team. UNK won the team title by 1/2 a point over Minnesota-State Mankato. In doing this, Dlagnev capped his senior season at a perfect 38-0.

Dlagnev was a 2006 Midlands Champion at 285 lbs. He also is one of a few non DI wrestlers to wrestle at the NWCA All-Star Classic. At the 2007 All-Star Classic, Dlagnev defeated Wade Sauer of Cal-State Fullerton 11-7.

== International career ==
Dlagnev has made eight national teams (Top 3 at the World Team Trials) since 2009, winning the World Team Trials each year with the exception of 2010. Dlagnev has won two bronze medals at the World Wrestling Championships, in 2009 and 2014. At the 2009 World Wrestling Championships, Dlagnev finished 4–1 with a loss in the semifinals to Fardin Masoumi, while at the 2014 World Wrestling Championships Dlagnev also finished 4–1 with a loss in the quarterfinals to eventual champion Taha Akgül.

Dlagnev finished fifth at the World Championships in 2011 and 2013, while finishing with a third place bronze medal at the 2012 Olympics. During the wrestling competition at the 2012 Summer Olympics, Dlagnev finished in fifth place after he was pinned by Artur Taymazov from Uzbekistan in the semi-final and suffered a loss against Komeil Ghasemi from Iran in his bronze medal bout due to separated cartilage in his rib cage. On 23 July 2019 it was announced that as a result of retesting samples, Artur Taymazov had been disqualified from the 2012 Olympics for a drug violation, and his gold medal from that event also withdrawn. This result elevated Dlagnev to third place, and he is now the 2012 Olympic 120 kg bronze medalist.

In 2015, Dlagnev won the United States World Team Trials but was unable to compete at the 2015 World Wrestling Championships and was replaced by Zach Rey, who was runner-up at the trials. Dlagnev also won the 2016 US Olympic Team Trials in 2016 and represented the United States at the 2016 Olympics in Brazil, where he reached the semi-finals, but again missed out on a medal after losing to Geno Petriashvili in his bronze medal bout.

Other tournaments won by Dlagnev include the US Open (2011–2015), World University Games in 2008, Pan American Games in 2011, Alexander Medved International (2010, 2013), Cerro Pelado International in 2012, and the New York AC International Open (2008–2010, 2012)

In 2019, the two-time Olympian had his 2012 Olympic results upgraded to bronze in the 120kg freestyle class following the International Olympic Committee's announcement they are stripping Uzbekistan's Artur Taymazov of his gold medal for a doping violation. Dlagnev had originally finished fifth, but Davit Modzmanashvili was also stripped of his silver earlier in the year due to doping.

On 6 March 2022, Dlagnev received his 2012 Olympic bronze medal during the Olympic Medal Reallocation Ceremony in Lincoln, Neb. just prior to the final session of the 2022 Big Ten Conference Wrestling Championships.

== Coaching career ==
Dlagnev served as an assistant to Tom Ryan at Ohio State and Ohio RTC from 2016 until 2021, where he coached NCAA champions like Kyle Snyder and Myles Martin. He is currently an assistant at the University of Nebraska.
