= The Sticking Place =

Documentary

- Website type: Web documentary
- Available in: English
- Creator: Moosestash Films
- Website: www.thestickingplacefilm.ca
- Launched: 2012

The Sticking Place is a 2012 interactive web documentary by Moosestash Films. The film explores the journey of elite athlete, Leah Callahan, a freestyle wrestler with a dream to compete in the Olympic Games.

== Story ==
Following Leah Callahan, the web documentary blends together some of the key moments in the wrestler's push to the Olympic Games, presenting her journey through collage, video, animation, photos, audio clips, and user activated/generated content, housed within a collection of vibrant, responsive web-screens. Audiences are invited to explore some of the intimate details of Leah's day-to-day life, watch her train, read her personal journal entries and emails, share in her childhood home videos, and spend moments with friends and family, all the while examining the realities of what it takes to pursue an Olympic-sized dream.

== Production ==
Vancouver-based filmmakers Josephine Anderson and Brittany Baxter co-directed/produced the film, following and filming Callahan over the span of a year in Edmonton, Calgary, Winnipeg, Mackenzie and Prince George. The Sticking Place was produced with assistance from the National Film Board of Canada's Filmmaker Assistance Program, and with funds generated from a crowd-funding campaign on Kickstarter.

== Release ==
The Sticking Place went live online on June 27, 2012. On February 24, 2013, The Sticking Place was awarded a Pixel Award for Best Sports Project, also garnering the People's Champ Award. On November 15, 2012, The Sticking Place was nominated for Best Web Series: Non-Fiction at the Digi Awards in Toronto, formerly known as the Canadian New Media Awards.
