= Brandon Escobar =

Honduran American freestyle wrestler

Brandon Escobar (born September 25, 1990, in Queens, New York) is a Honduran-American Olympian, freestyle wrestler. He qualified to wrestle in the men's freestyle 55 kg division at the 2012 Summer Olympics for the country of, Honduras. Honduras' first, and only, qualified Olympic freestyle wrestler, qualifying at the 2012 Pan American Wrestling Olympic Qualification Tournament. He largely grew up on the North Shore of Suffolk County, Long Island, New York. Graduating from Rocky Point High School, and briefly attending Nassau Community College. He earned All-American honors, placing 6th at the NJCAA, National Collegiate Championship in 2020.

He lost to Mihran Jaburyan in the second round of the men's -55 kg freestyle division.
