= Wrestling at the 2011 Pan American Games – Men's Greco-Roman 60 kg =

Men's Greco–Roman 60 kg at the 2011 Pan American Games
- Venue: CODE II Gymnasium
- Dates: October 20
- Competitors: 8 from 8 nations

Medalists
Gold medal	Luis Liendo	Venezuela
Silver medal	Joe Betterman	United States
Bronze medal	Hanser Meoque	Cuba
Bronze medal	Jansel Ramírez	Dominican Republic

The men's Greco–Roman 60 kg competition of the wrestling events at the 2011 Pan American Games in Guadalajara, Mexico, was held on October 21 at the CODE II Gymanasium. The defending champion was Roberto Monzon from Cuba.

This Greco-Roman wrestling competition consists of a single-elimination tournament, with a repechage used to determine the winner of two bronze medals. The two finalists face off for gold and silver medals. Each wrestler who loses to one of the two finalists moves into the repechage, culminating in a pair of bronze medal matches featuring the semifinal losers each facing the remaining repechage opponent from their half of the bracket.

Each bout consists of up to three rounds, lasting two minutes apiece. The wrestler who scores more points in each round is the winner of that rounds; the bout ends when one wrestler has won two rounds (and thus the match).

== Schedule ==
All times are Central Standard Time (UTC-6).

Date	Time	Round
October 21, 2011	10:00	Preliminary bouts
October 21, 2011	10:48	Preliminary bouts
October 21, 2011	18:00	Bronze medal matches
October 21, 2011	18:08	Final

== Results ==
=== Main bracket ===
Quarterfinals
Yesid Meneses (COL)	0	1	0
Luis Liendo (VEN)	1	0	5
Hanser Meoque (CUB)	4	4
Diego Romanelli (BRA)	0	0
Manuel Lopez (MEX)	0	1
Joe Betterman (USA)	3	1
German Diaz (PUR)	3	0
Jansel Ramírez (DOM)	0	8

Semifinals
Luis Liendo (VEN)	2	0	3
Hanser Meoque (CUB)	0	1	0
Joe Betterman (USA)	3	1
Jansel Ramírez (DOM)	0	0

Finals
Luis Liendo (VEN)	2	1
Joe Betterman (USA)	0	0

=== Repechage round ===
Two bronze medals were awarded.

Repechage round 1	Bronze Medal Bout
Yesid Meneses (COL)
Bye	Yesid Meneses (COL)	0 0
	Hanser Meoque (CUB)	3 2

Repechage round 1	Bronze Medal Bout
Manuel Lopez (MEX)
Bye	Manuel Lopez (MEX)	2 3 0
	Jansel Ramírez (DOM)	1 4 3
