= Yuri Maier =

Argentine wrestler (born 1989)

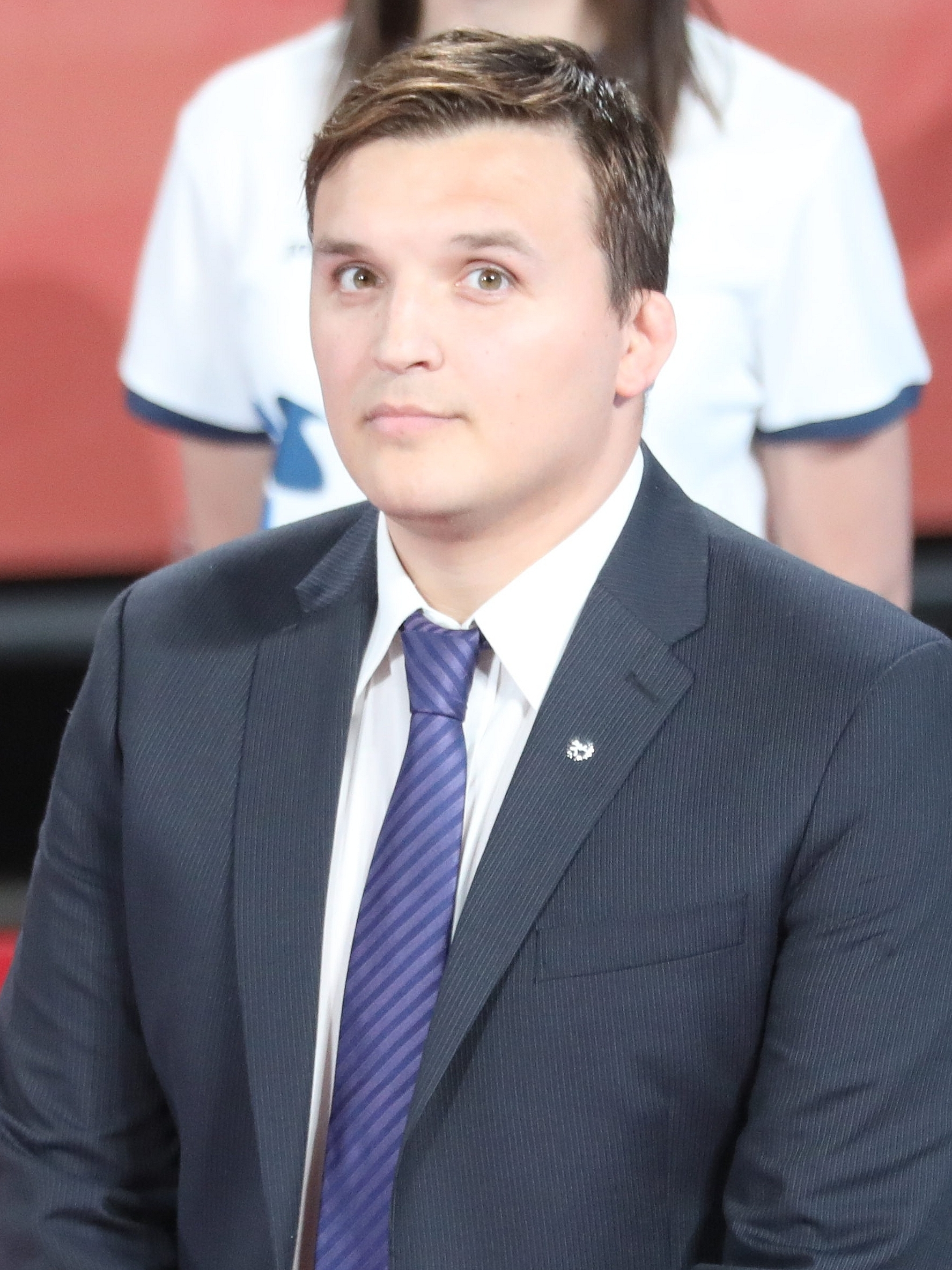
- Maier in 2018

Personal information
- Nationality: Argentina
- Born: April 5, 1989 (age 37) Corrientes, Argentina
- Height: 181 cm (5 ft 11 in)
- Weight: 96 kg (212 lb)
- Website: www.yurimaier.org

Sport
- Sport: Freestyle Wrestling
- Rank: 14°
- Club: KAV Mansfelder Land e.V.
- Coached by: Kazbek Dedegkaev
Medal record
Men's freestyle wrestling
Representing the Argentina
Pan-American Championships
Silver medal – second place	Cuenca 2004	Freestyle
Silver medal – second place	Cuenca 2004	Greco-Roman
Gold medal – first place	Santiago de Chile 2005	Freestyle
Gold medal – first place	Santiago de Chile 2005	Greco-Roman
Silver medal – second place	Ciudad de Guatemala 2006	Freestyle
Bronze medal – third place	Ciudad de Guatemala, 2006	Greco-Roman
Bronze medal – third place	Maracaibo 2007	Freestyle
Bronze medal – third place	Guadalajara 2009	Freestyle
Silver medal – second place	Guadalajara 2009	Greco-Roman
South American Games
Bronze medal – third place	Medellín 2010	Freestyle

Yuri Maier (born April 5, 1989) is an Argentine Olympic wrestler who has won multiple international titles representing his country and individually. Among his most outstanding results, he has been awarded 12 medals at Pan American Championships in several different age categories, making him the top Argentinian medalist in wrestling history. He also received the Revelation Sports Clarín Award in 2004, winner of the Jorge Newbery award in 2005 as the best athlete of the City of Buenos Aires in this field. He was nominated many times for the best Argentinian athlete award.

== Biography ==
Born in Corrientes, Argentina, in a humble neighborhood of the Corrientes capital (Laguna seca). At the age of six he moved to Buenos Aires with his family because of his father's work. In his early years of sport activity he performed various sports such as swimming and gymnastics, but at the age of seven he became more interested in Olympic Wrestling. He competed locally with good results from the beginning, and that motivated his commitment to the sport. His first appearance in international events representing his country was in 2001 in the neighboring country of Chile, where he won the gold medal in the International Tournament Barros Arana. And since then, his name has not stopped appearing in international competitions at a Pan-American and global level. Despite his young age he has won multiple international titles representing his country professionally. Among the most outstanding results are a total of 12 medals at the Pan American Championships in various age categories, making it the largest Argentinian medalist in his discipline in the history. He was also the first Argentinian medalist at the Pan American Games of XVI Pan American Games Guadalajara 2011 after 20 years of Argentina not obtaining a medal in the event. Yuri ha's won several awards over the course of the years, such as the Sports Ministry of the Province of Corrientes to outstanding athletes in this province, the Revelation Sports Clarín Award in 2004, the Jorge Newbery Award in 2005 for the best athlete of the City of Buenos Aires and was nominated several times to the Olympia awards for best Argentinian athlete in the category of wrestling. Nowadays he belongs to the KAV Mansfelder Land E.V. Club for whom he wrestles in the Ringen Bundesliga (German League of Wrestling). Olympic Wrestling is not a popular sport in Argentina so Yuri has had to cross the borders of his native country since the beginning of his career, to stand out and get better training. He spent several seasons training in countries such as Cuba, America, Germany and Russia. Because of this, he had to spend long periods away from home. To get the results he is aiming for he needs to be moved to the city of Vladikavkaz, Russia in 2012 in order to prepare for the Olympic Games of Rio de Janeiro 2016. Yuri Olimpia won the Silver award 2013 as best fighter of the year.

== Post Competitive Career ==
Since 2016, Maier has worked with United World Wrestling (UWW) as the sport and development officer for the Pan Am/Americas region.

== Main results ==
- Pan American Championships Cadet 2004: Freestyle (silver) Greco-Roman (silver).
- Pan American Championships Cadet 2005: Freestyle (gold) Greco-Roman (gold).
- Pan American Championships Junior 2006: Freestyle (silver) Greco-Roman (bronze).
- Pan American Championships Junior 2007: Freestyle (bronze).
- Pan American Championships Junior 2009: Freestyle (bronze) Greco-Roman (silver).
- IX South American Games 2010: Free (bronze).
- 2011 Pan American Games: Greco-Roman (bronze).
- South American Championship 2011 Freestyle (gold). Greco-Roman (gold).
- Senior Pan American Championship 2012: Freestyle (silver).
- Senior Pan American Championship 2013: Freestyle (silver).
