= Jansel Ramírez =

Dominican Republic Greco-Roman wrestler

Personal information
- Full name: Jansel Rafael Ramírez Feliz
- Nationality: Dominican Republic
- Born: 25 September 1983 (age 42) Santo Domingo, Dominican Republic
- Height: 1.70 m (5 ft 7 in)
- Weight: 64 kg (141 lb)

Sport
- Style: Greco-Roman
- Club: DR National Team
- Coach: Alexis Camué
Medal record
Men's Greco-Roman wrestling
Representing Dominican Republic
Pan American Games
Bronze medal – third place	2007 Rio de Janeiro	55 kg
Bronze medal – third place	2011 Guadalajara	60 kg
Central American and Caribbean Games
Silver medal – second place	2006 Cartagena	55 kg
Bronze medal – third place	2010 Mayagüez	60 kg

Jansel Rafael Ramírez Feliz (born 25 September 1983, in Santo Domingo) is an amateur Dominican Republic Greco-Roman wrestler, who competed in the men's featherweight category. Considered one of the Caribbean's top Greco-Roman wrestlers in his decade, Ramirez has claimed two bronze medals in the 55 and 60-kg division at the Pan American Games (2007 and 2011), and also represented the Dominican Republic at the 2004 Summer Olympics. Ramirez is also a member of the wrestling club for the Dominican Republic National Team, under his personal coach and mentor Alexis Camué.

Ramirez qualified as a lone wrestler for the Dominican Republic squad in the men's 55 kg class at the 2004 Summer Olympics in Athens, by receiving a wild card invitation from the International Federation of Associated Wrestling (FILA). He lost two straight matches, one to Japan's Masatoshi Toyota due to the ten–point superiority limit, and the other to Hungarian wrestler and eventual winner István Majoros with a 5–0 decision, leaving Ramirez on the bottom of the pool and placing last out of twenty-two wrestlers in the final standings.
