= Daulet Shabanbay =

Kazakhstani freestyle wrestler

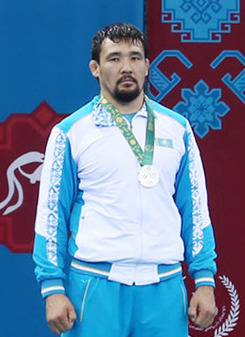
- Shabanbay at the 2017 Islamic Solidarity Games

Medal record

Men's freestyle wrestling

Representing Kazakhstan

Olympic Games
Bronze medal – third place	2012 London	120 kg

Asian Games
Silver medal – second place	2014 Incheon	125 kg

Asian Championships
Silver medal – second place	2014 Bangkok	125 kg
Bronze medal – third place	2014 Astana	125 kg
Bronze medal – third place	2011 Tashkent	96 kg
Bronze medal – third place	2009 Pattaya	96 kg
Bronze medal – third place	2008 Jeju City	96 kg

Islamic Solidarity Games
Silver medal – second place	2017 Baku	125 kg

Daulet Shabanbay (Kazakh: Даулет Шабанбай; born 9 August 1983 in Pavlodar) is a Kazakhstani freestyle wrestler. He competed in the freestyle 120 kg event at the 2012 Summer Olympics and lost the bronze medal match to Bilyal Makhov. He was awarded a bronze in 2019 after the original gold and silver medalists were stripped for failing drug tests.
