= Hanser Meoque =

Cuban Greco-Roman wrestler

Personal information
- Full name: Hanser Lenier Meoque; Lugoñes
- Nationality: Cuba
- Born: 24 October 1987 (age 38) Pinar del Río, Cuba
- Weight: 60 kg (132 lb)

Sport
- Sport: Wrestling
- Event: Greco-Roman
- Club: Cerro Pelado
- Coached by: Julio Mendieta
Medal record
Men's Greco-Roman wrestling
Representing Cuba
Pan American Games
| Bronze medal – third place | 2011 Guadalajara | 60 kg |

Hanser Lenier Meoque Lugones (born October 24, 1987, in Pinar del Río) is an amateur Cuban Greco-Roman wrestler, who competes in the men's lightweight category (60 kg). He won a bronze medal in his division at the 2011 Pan American Games in Guadalajara, Mexico.

Meoque represented Cuba at the 2012 Summer Olympics in London, where he competed in the men's 60 kg class. He received a bye for the preliminary round of sixteen match, before losing to South Korean wrestler and former Olympic champion Jung Ji-Hyun, who was able to score nine points in two straight periods, leaving Meoque without a single point.
