= Leah Callahan =

Canadian freestyle wrestler

Leah Callahan OLY
Personal information
- Born: June 20, 1987 (age 39) St. John's, Newfoundland and Labrador
- Height: 1.61 m (5 ft 3 in)
- Weight: 72 kg (159 lb; 11 st 5 lb)

Sport
- Country: Canada
- Sport: Wrestling

Leah Ferguson (née Callahan; born June 20, 1987) is a female freestyle wrestler from Canada. Callahan was born in St. John's, Newfoundland and Labrador, grew up in Mackenzie, British Columbia, and currently resides in Calgary, Alberta. In 2012, Callahan won the gold medal at the Pan American Qualification tournament and thus qualified to compete at the 2012 Summer Olympics. At the 2012 Summer Olympics, she lost in the second round to Ochirbatyn Burmaa.

Callahan is the subject of an interactive documentary film called The Sticking Place, released on June 27, 2012.
