= Davit Modzmanashvili =

Georgian freestyle wrestler

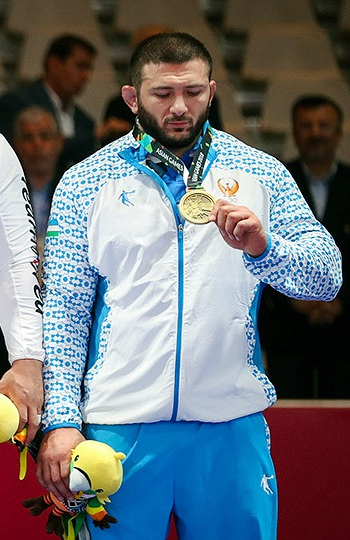
- Modzmanashvili at the 2018 Asian Games

Personal information
- Full name: Davit Modzmanashvili
- Nationality: Georgian; Uzbekistani
- Born: 9 November 1986 (age 39) Tbilisi, Georgian SSR, Soviet Union
- Height: 190 cm (6 ft 3 in)

Sport
- Sport: Freestyle wrestling
- Coached by: Alim Khikmatov
Medal record
Representing Georgia
Olympic Games
Disqualified	2012 London	120 kg
World Championships
Bronze medal – third place	2011 Istanbul	120 kg
European Championships
Bronze medal – third place	2012 Belgrad	120 kg
Representing Uzbekistan
Asian Games
Bronze medal – third place	2018 Jakarta	125 kg
Asian Championships
Gold medal – first place	2018 Bishkek	125 kg
Asian Indoor Games
Gold medal – first place	2017 Ashgabat	125 kg

Davit Modzmanashvili (Georgian: დავით მოძმანაშვილი) (born 13 July 1986) is a heavyweight freestyle wrestler from Georgia who since 2017 competes for Uzbekistan.

== Career ==
He placed third at the 2011 World Championships.

After winning a European title in 2008, Modzmanashvili tested positive for a banned substance. He was stripped of his gold medal and received a two-year suspension.

== Doping violation ==
Modzmanashvili initially won on a silver medal for Georgia at the 2012 Olympics. However, in January 2019, he tested positive for a prohibited substance of dehydrochlormethyltestosterone after stored samples from the 2012 Olympics were re-analysed. He was subsequently stripped of his Olympic silver medal and banned for 6 years.

== Professional Wrestling ==
On 24 November, 2024, Modzmanashvili made his professional wrestling debut at Game Changer Wrestling (GCW)’s Josh Barnett's Bloodsport XII.
