= Aleksey Shemarov =

Belarusian wrestler (born 1982)

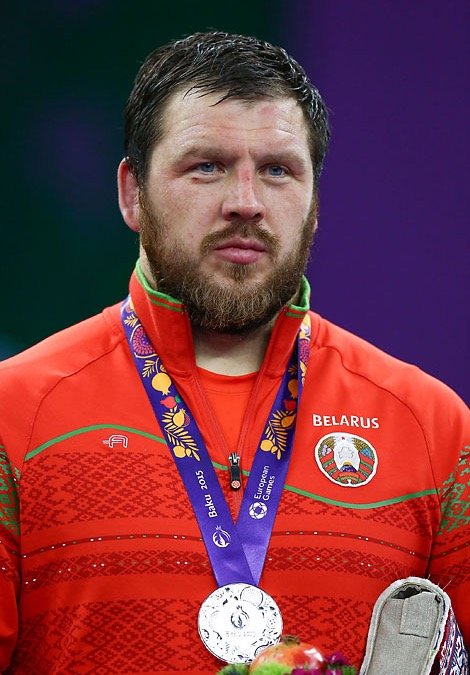

Medal record

Men's Freestyle wrestling

Representing Belarus

World Championships
Gold medal – first place	2011 Istanbul	120 kg

European Games
Silver medal – second place	2015 Baku	125kg

European Championships
Bronze medal – third place	2010 Baku	120 kg
Silver medal – second place	2011 Dortmund	120 kg

Aliaksei Shamarau' (Russian: Алексей Шемаров, Belarusian: Аляксей Шамараў, born September 16, 1982, in Kaliningrad) is a Russian male freestyle wrestler who competing for Belarus.

World Champion 2011 and runner-up European Games 2015.
