= Fardin Masoumi =

Iranian wrestler (born 1977)

Personal information
- Full name: Fardin Masoumi Valadi
- Nationality: Iran
- Born: 10 November 1977 (age 48) Masal, Gilan, Iran
- Height: 185 cm (6 ft 1 in)
- Weight: 120 kg (265 lb)

Sport
- Country: Iran
- Sport: Freestyle wrestling, varzesh-e bastani

Achievements and titles
- National finals: Pahlevan of Iran: 1386
Medal record
Men's freestyle wrestling
Representing Iran
World Championships
Silver medal – second place	2009 Herning	120 kg
Bronze medal – third place	2006 Guangzhou	120 kg
Asian Games
Silver medal – second place	2006 Doha	120 kg
Bronze medal – third place	2010 Guangzhou	120 kg
Asian Championships
Gold medal – first place	2004 Tehran	120 kg
Gold medal – first place	2007 Bishkek	120 kg
Gold medal – first place	2008 Jeju City	120 kg
Gold medal – first place	2009 Pattaya	120 kg

Fardin Masoumi Valadi (Persian: فردین معصومی ولدی, born 10 November 1977 in Masal) is an Iranian freestyle wrestler. He has won medals at the World Wrestling Championships, Asian Games, and the Asian Wrestling Championships. He also became Pahlevan of Iran.
