= Komeil Ghasemi =

Iranian wrestler (born 1988)

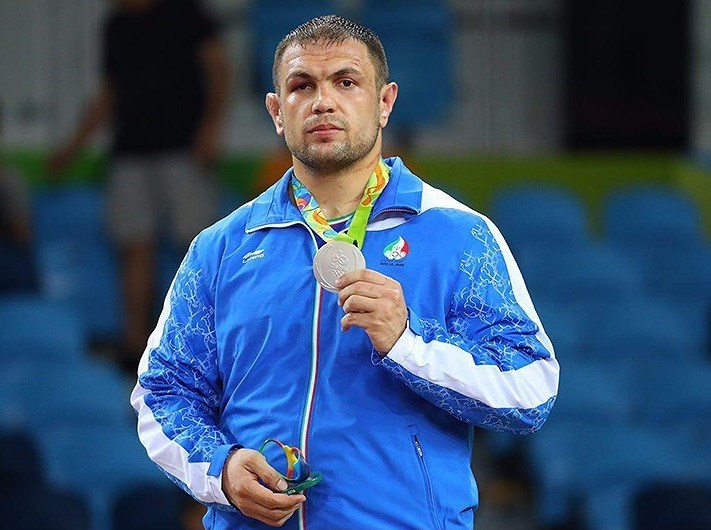
- Ghasemi at the 2016 Summer Olympics

Personal information
- Native name: کمیل قاسمی
- Full name: Komeil Ghasemi
- National team: Iran
- Born: 27 February 1988 (age 38) Juybar, Mazandaran, Iran
- Height: 183 cm (6 ft 0 in)
- Weight: 120 kg (265 lb)
- Website: instagram

Sport
- Sport: Wrestling
- Coached by: Rasoul Khadem
Medal record
Men's freestyle wrestling
Representing Iran
Olympic Games
Gold medal – first place	2012 London	120 kg
Silver medal – second place	2016 Rio de Janeiro	125 kg
World Championships
Silver medal – second place	2014 Tashkent	125 kg
Asian Championships
Gold medal – first place	2014 Astana	125 kg
Silver medal – second place	2011 Tashkent	120 kg
Silver medal – second place	2015 Doha	125 kg
Yasar Dogu Tournament
Silver medal – second place	2014 Istanbul	125 kg
Golden Grand Prix
Silver medal – second place	2012 Tehran	120 kg
Grand Prix
Gold medal – first place	2012 Madrid	120 kg
Gold medal – first place	2016 Paris	125 kg
Gold medal – first place	2018 Yakutsk	125 kg
Silver medal – second place	2009 Esfahan	96 kg
Silver medal – second place	2011 Kish	120 kg
Bronze medal – third place	2014 Tehran	125 kg
Bronze medal – third place	2016 Minsk	125 kg

Komeil Ghasemi (Persian: کمیل قاسمی, born 27 February 1988) is a retired Iranian wrestler who won a gold medal in the men's freestyle 120 kg event at the 2012 Summer Olympics. Ghasemi was awarded his Olympic gold medal after the two wrestlers ahead of him failed drug tests. Ghasemi is the most successful Iranian heavyweight wrestler at the Olympic Games.

He also won a silver medal at the 2011 Asian Wrestling Championships in the 120 kg freestyle discipline. He was born in Juybar, in Iran's Mazandaran province but spent his childhood in Sari. He started wrestling seriously after moving back to Juybar. Following his Olympic appearance, Ghasemi won the 120 kg weight class at the 2013 Freestyle World Cup in Tehran, Iran, helping his nation take gold in the tournament. At the 2014 Asian Wrestling Championships he won a gold medal in the 125 kg freestyle tournament, while at that year's World Championships he took silver in the same event. He took silver in the 125 kg freestyle event at the 2015 Asian Wrestling Championships, losing the final to Aiaal Lazarev of Kyrgyzstan, and the 2016 Summer Olympics, behind Taha Akgül of Turkey. Ghasemi retired in 2019 after losing the Iranian trials for the 2019 World Wrestling Championships.

== Coaching career ==
As of 2023, Ghasemi is the head coach of Cambodian national wrestling team. He started his coaching position in October 2020. Under Ghasemi Cambodian wrestlers recorded a total haul of 19 medals (three golds, three silvers and 13 bronzes) at the 2022 Southeast Asian Wrestling Championship, their biggest ever since first joining the regional tournament a few years back.

== Personal life ==
On 7 January 2026, Ghasemi publicly supported the 2025–2026 Iranian protests on his Instagram, stating: "Be afraid of blood that will be shed unjustly." He had previously written "This is the law of the times. Those who mock the pain of the people will not be spared the pain of the times."
