= Arjan Bhullar =

Canadian mixed martial artist and wrestler

- Born: Arjan Singh Bhullar; May 13, 1986 (age 40); Richmond, British Columbia, Canada
- Height: 6 ft 1 in (185 cm)
- Weight: 245 lb (111 kg; 17 st 7 lb)
- Division: Heavyweight
- Reach: 76 in (193 cm)
- Style: Wrestling
- Stance: Orthodox
- Fighting out of: Richmond, British Columbia, Canada
- Team: Checkmat Vancouver (formerly); American Kickboxing Academy (2014–present); WKX Vancouver
- Wrestling: Olympic Freestyle Wrestling; NAIA Wrestling
- Years active: 2014–present

Mixed martial arts record
- Total: 14
- Wins: 11
- By knockout: 4
- By decision: 7
- Losses: 3
- By knockout: 1
- By submission: 1
- By disqualification: 1

Amateur record
- Total: 1
- Wins: 1

Other information
- University: Simon Fraser University
- Mixed martial arts record from Sherdog
Medal record
Men's freestyle wrestling
Representing Canada
Commonwealth Games
Gold medal – first place	2010 Delhi	120 kg
Pan American Games
Bronze medal – third place	2007 Rio De Janeiro	120 kg
World University Championships
Bronze medal – third place	2006 Ulanbataar	120 kg
FILA Grand Prix of Germany
Gold medal – first place	2012 Cologne	120 kg
Pan American Olympic Qualification Tournament
Gold medal – first place	2012 Kissimmee	120 kg

Arjan Singh Bhullar (born May 13, 1986) is a Indo-Canadian mixed martial artist currently competing in the heavyweight division of ONE Championship, where he is the former ONE Heavyweight World Champion. He has also competed in the Ultimate Fighting Championship.

Bhullar is also a former freestyle wrestler and collegiate wrestler. In freestyle, he was a CIS national champion in 2009 and represented Canada at the 2007, 2009, 2010 and 2011 World Championships, the 2010 Commonwealth Games, the 2007 Pan American Games and the 2012 Summer Olympics. In folkstyle, Bhullar is a two-time NAIA champion.

== Wrestling career ==
=== Early life and collegiate wrestling ===
Bhullar was born and raised in Vancouver, British Columbia into Indian family from Punjab, India. He started wrestling at a young age. As a collegiate wrestler, he competed for the Simon Fraser Clan at Simon Fraser University, a NAIA university at the time. He had a successful career while wrestling at 285 pounds, placing third in 2007 and becoming champion in 2008 and 2009 at the NAIA Wrestling Championships. He was also named Canada's wrestler of the year and NAIA outstanding wrestler in 2009. At the 2009 CIS Championships, Bhullar became the first wrestler to ever win the NAIA and CIS titles in the same year.

=== Freestyle career ===
For five years, Bhullar was a member of the Canadian national team and was also the 120 kg national champion from 2008 to 2012. In 2006, Bhullar placed third at the World University Championships. In 2007, he won a bronze medal at the Pan American Games and competed at the World Championships. He competed again at the World Championships in 2009 and 2010, in the latter year he also won the championship at 120 kg of the Commonwealth Games. In 2012, he became the first Canadian wrestler with South Asian ethnicity to represent Canada at the Summer Olympics. He placed 13th.

=== Coaching ===
Bhullar was one of the founding coaches of the UFV Cascades wrestling team at University of the Fraser Valley. He is also a member of his family's training center, Bhullar Wrestling Club.

== Mixed martial arts career ==
=== Early career ===
In August 2014, Bhullar had his first amateur fight as a mixed martial artist. He turned pro in November of that year fighting with the Battlefield Fight League. Over the next few years, Bhullar competed exclusively in his native Canada and remained undefeated with a record of six wins. Arjan won the vacant BFL Heavyweight Title with a victory over Blake Nash on October 17, 2015. He defended the title twice.

=== Ultimate Fighting Championship ===
Bhullar made his promotional debut at UFC 215 on September 9, 2017, against Luis Henrique. He won the fight via unanimous decision.

Bhullar's next fight was against Adam Wieczorek on April 14, 2018, at UFC on Fox 29. After controlling the first round with his wrestling, Bhullar would get caught with an omoplata early in the second round, officially losing the fight via submission in round 2.

For his third fight with the promotion, Bhullar faced Marcelo Golm on October 27, 2018, at UFC Fight Night 138. He won the fight via unanimous decision.

Bhullar next faced Juan Adams on May 4, 2019, at UFC Fight Night 151. He won the fight by unanimous decision. The fight marked the last fight of his prevailing contract with the UFC.

=== ONE Championship ===
On July 3, 2019, it was announced that Bhullar signed a deal with Asia-based MMA promotion ONE Championship, and was expected to make his promotional debut against Mauro Cerilli at ONE Championship: Dawn of Heroes on August 2, 2019. However, Cerilli pulled out of the bout due to staph infection and the fight was cancelled. The fight eventually took place at ONE Championship: Century on October 13, 2019, with Bhullar winning by unanimous decision.

==== ONE Heavyweight World Champion ====
On February 1, 2020, it was announced that Bhullar would be challenging Brandon Vera for the ONE Heavyweight World Championship at ONE Championship: Code of Honor on May 29, 2020, but the fight was cancelled due to the COVID-19 pandemic. The bout was rebooked to take place at ONE Championship: Dangal on May 15, 2021. He defeated Vera via second-round technical knockout to win the ONE Heavyweight World Championship, becoming the first fighter of Canadian/Indian descent to win an MMA world title.

After a contract dispute, Bhullar eventually signed a new contract with the organization and was scheduled to face interim champion Anatoly Malykhin for the ONE Heavyweight World Championship unification bout at ONE 161 on September 29, 2022. However, Bhullar withdrew due to an injury in training, It was announced that Bhullar had surgery on the arm two weeks prior and the bout was cancelled. The bout was rescheduled for March 25, 2023, at ONE Fight Night 8. In turn, the bout was removed from the event due to a shift in broadcaster commitments and the bout will be rescheduled again to a later date. The bout was scheduled on July 15, 2023, at ONE Fight Night 12. However, for unknown reasons, the bout was moved to ONE Friday Fights 22 on June 22. Bhullar lost the bout and the title via TKO in the third round.

==== Post championship ====
Bhullar faced Amir Aliakbari on March 1, 2024, at ONE 166. He lost the fight via disqualification due to timidity in round three.

== Personal life ==
Bhullar is of Indian Punjabi Sikh descent.

Through his MMA career, Bhullar has developed a friendship with fellow Indo-Canadian and former WWE champion Jinder Mahal.

== Championships and achievements ==
=== Mixed martial arts ===
- ONE Championship
  - ONE Heavyweight World Championship (one time)
- Battlefield Fight League
  - BFL Heavyweight Championship (one time)

=== Freestyle wrestling ===
- United World Wrestling
  - 2012 Germany Grand Prix Gold Medalist
  - 2012 Pan American Olympic Qualification Tournament Gold Medalist
  - 2010 Commonwealth Games Gold Medalist
  - 2007 Pan American Games Bronze Medalist
  - 2006 World University Championships Bronze Medalist
  - 2005 World Junior Championships - 5th place
  - 2004 Pan American Championships Gold Medalist
- Wrestling Canada Lutte
  - 2012 Canadian Olympic Team Member
  - 2012 Canadian Senior National Champion
  - 2011 Canadian Senior World Team Member
  - 2011 Canadian Senior National Champion
  - 2010 Canadian Senior World Team Member
  - 2010 Canadian Senior National Champion
  - 2009 Canadian Senior Wrestler of the Year
  - 2009 Canadian Senior World Team Member
  - 2009 Canadian Senior National Champion
  - 2008 Canadian Senior National Champion
  - 2007 Canadian Senior World Team Member
  - 2006 Canadian Junior National Champion
  - 2006 Canadian Junior World Team Member
  - 2005 Canadian Junior National Champion
  - 2005 Canadian Junior World Team Member
- Canadian Interuniversity Sport
  - CIS 130 kg National Champion out of Simon Fraser University (2009)

=== Collegiate wrestling ===
- National Association of Intercollegiate Athletics
  - NAIA Outstanding Wrestler (2009)
  - NAIA 285 lb National Champion out of Simon Fraser University (2009)
  - NAIA 285 lb National Champion out of Simon Fraser University (2008)
  - NAIA 285 lb National 3rd Place out of Simon Fraser University (2007)

== Mixed martial arts record ==
Professional record breakdown
14 matches	11 wins	3 losses
By knockout	4	1
By submission	0	1
By decision	7	0
By disqualification	0	1

Res.	Record	Opponent	Method	Event	Date	Round	Time	Location	Notes
Loss	11–3	Amir Aliakbari	DQ (timidity)	ONE 166	March 1, 2024	3	4:50	Lusail, Qatar	The bout was ended by disqualification due to the referee giving Bhullar a red card for inactivity.
Loss	11–2	Anatoly Malykhin	TKO (punches)	ONE Friday Fights 22	June 23, 2023	3	2:42	Bangkok, Thailand	Lost the ONE Heavyweight Championship.
Win	11–1	Brandon Vera	TKO (punches)	ONE: Dangal	April 28, 2021	2	4:27	Kallang, Singapore	Won the ONE Heavyweight Championship.
Win	10–1	Mauro Cerilli	Decision (unanimous)	ONE: Century – Part 2	October 13, 2019	3	5:00	Tokyo, Japan	
Win	9–1	Juan Adams	Decision (unanimous)	UFC Fight Night: Iaquinta vs. Cowboy	May 4, 2019	3	5:00	Ottawa, Ontario, Canada	
Win	8–1	Marcelo Golm	Decision (unanimous)	UFC Fight Night: Volkan vs. Smith	October 27, 2018	3	5:00	Moncton, New Brunswick, Canada	
Loss	7–1	Adam Wieczorek	Submission (omoplata)	UFC on Fox: Poirier vs. Gaethje	April 14, 2018	2	1:59	Glendale, Arizona, United States	
Win	7–0	Luis Henrique	Decision (unanimous)	UFC 215	September 9, 2017	3	5:00	Edmonton, Alberta, Canada	
Win	6–0	Joe Yager	Decision (unanimous)	Battlefield Fight League 48	April 9, 2017	3	5:00	Coquitlam, British Columbia, Canada	
Win	5–0	Chris Catala	TKO (punches)	Hard Knocks 51	October 14, 2016	1	4:29	Calgary, Alberta, Canada	
Win	4–0	Ryan Pokryfky	Decision (unanimous)	Battlefield Fight League 45	September 17, 2016	5	5:00	Coquitlam, British Columbia, Canada	Defended the BFL Heavyweight Championship.
Win	3–0	Blake Nash	TKO (doctor stoppage)	Battlefield Fight League 39	October 17, 2015	2	5:00	Coquitlam, British Columbia, Canada	Won the vacant BFL Heavyweight Championship.
Win	2–0	Jon-Taine Hall	Decision (unanimous)	Hard Knocks 44	June 28, 2015	3	5:00	Calgary, Alberta, Canada	
Win	1–0	Adam Santos	TKO (punches)	Battlefield Fight League 33	November 7, 2014	3	2:22	Coquitlam, British Columbia, Canada	Heavyweight debut.

== See also ==
- List of current ONE fighters
