= Bilyal Makhov =

Russian martial artist and wrestler

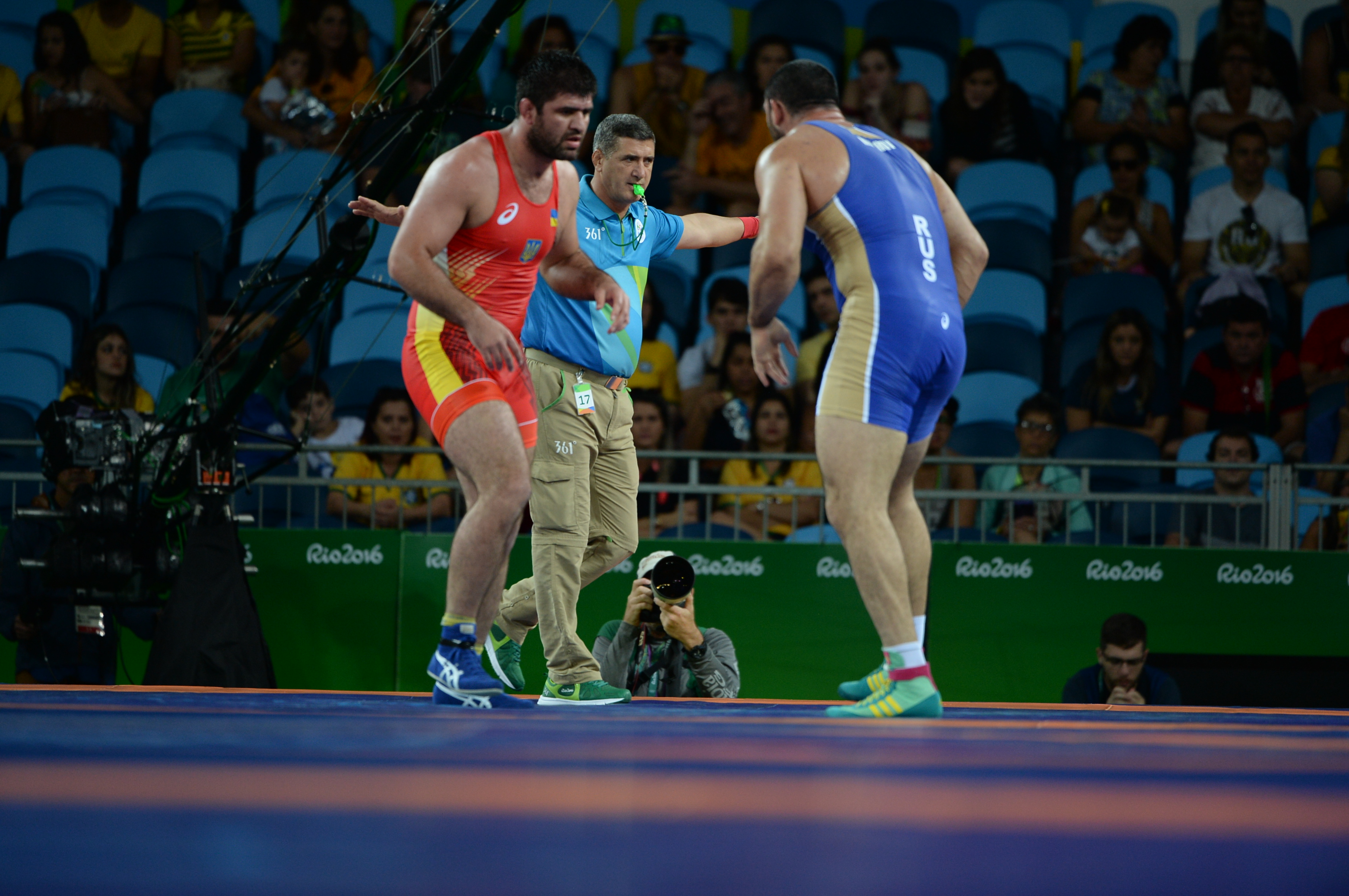
- 2016 Summer Olympics, Makhov (right) vs Zasyeyev (left)

Personal information
- Full name: Bilyal Valeryevich Makhov
- Citizenship: Russian
- Born: 20 September 1987 (age 39) Nalchik, Kabardino-Balkaria, Russia
- Height: 196 cm (6 ft 5 in)
- Weight: 125–130 kg (276–287 lb)

Sport
- Country: Kabardino-Balkaria, Russia
- Sport: Wrestling
- Events: Freestyle and Greco-Roman
- Club: CSKA Wrestling club, Khasavyurt WC
- Coached by: Gadzhi Gadzhiev, Magomed Guseinov, Khankala Gadzhimagomedov
Medal record
Men's freestyle wrestling
Representing Russia
Olympic Games
Gold medal – first place	2012 London	120 kg
World Championships
Gold medal – first place	2007 Baku	120 kg
Gold medal – first place	2009 Herning	120 kg
Gold medal – first place	2010 Moscow	120 kg
Silver medal – second place	2011 Istanbul	120 kg
Disqualified	2015 Las Vegas	125 kg
European Championships
Gold medal – first place	2010 Baku	120 kg
Men's Greco-Roman wrestling
World Championships
Bronze medal – third place	2014 Tashkent	130 kg
Disqualified	2015 Las Vegas	130 kg

Bilyal Valerievich Makhov (Russian: Билял Валерьевич Махов, Kabardian: Махуэ Билал Валерий и къуэ; born 20 September 1987 in Nalchik) is a Russian freestyle and Greco-Roman wrestler. He was the Russian champion in 2007 and 2010, European champion in 2010 and World champion in 2007, 2009 and 2010 in Men's Freestyle 120 kg wrestling and bronze medalist in 130 kg Greco-Roman Wrestling at the World Championships in 2014 and 2015. In 2015, he won the Russian National Greco-Roman Wrestling Championships.

He originally won the bronze medal at the 2012 Summer Olympics in the men's 120 kg category but was upgraded to joint gold medallist with Komeil Ghasemi of Iran in 2020, when retesting of samples revealed both finalists had used illegal substances. In September 2021, Makhov was himself banned for four years after an anti-doping violation. Makhov is noted as retired on UFC's official website & has not competed in a UWW event since 2020.

== Ultimate Fighting Championship ==
On 25 April 2015, it was announced that Makhov had signed with the Ultimate Fighting Championship to compete in the heavyweight division. Makhov decided to continue to wrestle in the hope to medal at the 2016 Summer Olympics in Rio de Janeiro. After the 2016 Summer Olympics, Makhov did not fight in the UFC due to long-term health issues caused by a mercury poisoning he had suffered in 2008.

== Championships and accomplishments ==
=== International Titles ===
- Freestyle:
  - 2005 World Junior Champion – 120 kg (Vilnius, Lithuania)
  - 2006 World Junior Champion – 120 kg (Guatemala City, Guatemala)
  - 2007 World Champion – 120 kg (Baku, Azerbaijan)
  - 2008 Golden Grand-Prix Ivan Yarygin 3rd – 120 kg (Krasnoyarsk, Russia)
  - 2009 World Champion – 120 kg (Herning, Denmark)
  - 2010 European Champion – 120 kg (Baku, Azerbaijan)
  - 2010 World Champion – 120 kg (Moscow, Russia)
  - 2011 World Championships runner-up – 120 kg (Istanbul, Turkey)
  - 2012 Olympic Gold Medalist – 120 kg (London, England)
  - 2015 Ali Aliyev Memorial winner – 125 kg (Kaspiysk, Dagestan)
  - 2015 World Championships Bronze Medalist – 125 kg (Las Vegas, United States)
- Greco-Roman:
  - 2005 World Junior Championships Bronze Medalist – 120 kg (Vilnius, Lithuania)
  - 2014 World Championships Bronze Medalist – 130 kg (Tashkent, Uzbekistan)
  - 2015 World Championships Bronze Medalist – 130 kg (Las Vegas, United States)

=== International accomplishments ===
The first wrestler in 42 years to win a medal at the same world championships in both freestyle and Greco-Roman (the last person to accomplish this was Jan Karlsson in 1973).

=== National Titles ===
- Freestyle:
  - 2006 Russian National Runner-up – 120 kg (Nizhnevartovsk, Yugra)
  - 2007 Russian National Champion – 120 kg (Moscow)
  - 2008 Russian National Bronze Medalist – 120 kg (Saint Petersburg, Leningrad)
  - 2009 Russian National Champion – 120 kg (Kazan, Tatarstan)
  - 2010 Russian National Champion – 120 kg (Volgograd)
  - 2012 Russian National Champion – 120 kg (Saint Petersburg, Leningrad)
- Greco-Roman:
  - 2015 Russian National Champion – 130 kg (Saint Petersburg, Leningrad)
  - 2016 Russian Nationals bronze medalist – 130 kg (Grozny, Chechnya)
