= Rıza Kayaalp =

Turkish sport wrestler (born 1989)

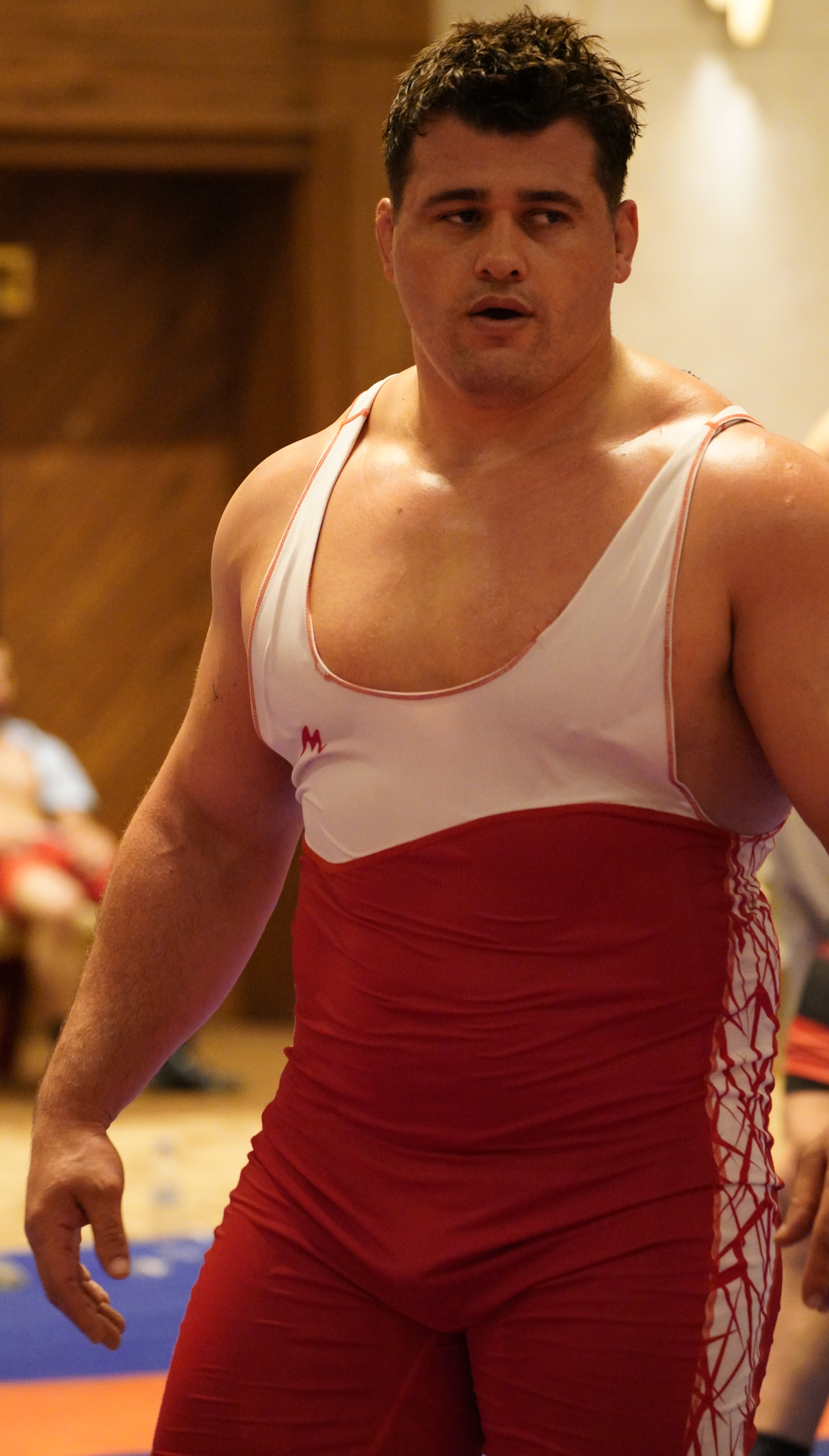
- Kayaalp in 2021

Personal information
- Nationality: Turkish
- Born: 10 October 1989 (age 37) Yozgat, Turkey
- Home town: Ankara, Turkey
- Education: Physical education Bozok University; Aksaray University
- Height: 1.84 m (6 ft 0 in)
- Weight: 130 kg (287 lb)

Sport
- Country: Turkey
- Sport: Wrestling
- Event: Greco-Roman
- Club: Ankara ASKI Sports Club
- Turned pro: 2005
- Coached by: Salih Bora, Akif Canbaş

Achievements and titles
- Highest world ranking: 1 (2022)
Medal record
Event	1st	2nd	3rd
Olympic Games	0	1	2
World Championships	5	3	2
European Championships	12	2	0
European Games	1	0	0
Military World Games	1	0	0
Mediterranean Games	2	0	0
World Cup	2	1	0
Vehbi Emre & Hamit Kaplan	8	0	2
Other	21	2	1
Total	52	9	7
Men's Greco-Roman wrestling
Representing Turkey
Olympic Games
Silver medal – second place	2016 Rio de Janeiro	130 kg
Bronze medal – third place	2012 London	120 kg
Bronze medal – third place	2020 Tokyo	130 kg
World Championships
Gold medal – first place	2011 Istanbul	120 kg
Gold medal – first place	2015 Las Vegas	130 kg
Gold medal – first place	2017 Paris	130 kg
Gold medal – first place	2019 Nur-Sultan	130 kg
Gold medal – first place	2022 Belgrade	130 kg
Silver medal – second place	2013 Budapest	120 kg
Silver medal – second place	2014 Tashkent	130 kg
Silver medal – second place	2023 Belgrade	130 kg
Bronze medal – third place	2009 Herning	120 kg
Bronze medal – third place	2010 Moscow	120 kg
European Championships
Gold medal – first place	2010 Baku	120 kg
Gold medal – first place	2012 Belgrad	120 kg
Gold medal – first place	2013 Tbilisi	120 kg
Gold medal – first place	2014 Vantaa	130 kg
Gold medal – first place	2016 Riga	130 kg
Gold medal – first place	2017 Novi Sad	130 kg
Gold medal – first place	2018 Kaspiysk	130 kg
Gold medal – first place	2019 Bucharest	130 kg
Gold medal – first place	2021 Warsaw	130 kg
Gold medal – first place	2022 Budapest	130 kg
Gold medal – first place	2023 Zagreb	130 kg
Gold medal – first place	2026 Tirana	130 kg
Silver medal – second place	2011 Dortmund	120 kg
Silver medal – second place	2024 Bucharest	130 kg
European Games
Gold medal – first place	2015 Baku	130 kg
Military World Games
Gold medal – first place	2019 Wuhan	130 kg
Mediterranean Games
Gold medal – first place	2009 Pescara	120 kg
Gold medal – first place	2013 Mersin	120 kg
Summer Universiade
Gold medal – first place	2013 Kazan	120 kg
World University Championship
Gold medal – first place	2010 Turin	120 kg
World Cup
Gold medal – first place	2011 Minsk	120 kg
Gold medal – first place	2012 Saransk	120 kg
Silver medal – second place	2010 Yerevan	120 kg
Vehbi Emre & Hamit Kaplan
Gold medal – first place	2009 Istanbul	120 kg
Gold medal – first place	2010 Istanbul	120 kg
Gold medal – first place	2011 Istanbul	120 kg
Gold medal – first place	2013 Istanbul	120 kg
Gold medal – first place	2014 Istanbul	130 kg
Gold medal – first place	2015 Istanbul	130 kg
Gold medal – first place	2017 Istanbul	130 kg
Gold medal – first place	2018 Istanbul	130 kg
Bronze medal – third place	2008 Istanbul	120 kg
Bronze medal – third place	2022 Istanbul	130 kg
Golden Grand Prix
Gold medal – first place	2008 Baku	120 kg
Gold medal – first place	2010 Baku	120 kg
Gold medal – first place	2010 Szombathely	120 kg
Gold medal – first place	2011 Baku	120 kg
Gold medal – first place	2014 Szombathely	130 kg
Grand Prix
Gold medal – first place	2016 Dortmund	130 kg
Gold medal – first place	2020 Zagreb	130 kg
Gold medal – first place	2021 Rome	130 kg
Gold medal – first place	2022 Rome	130 kg
Gold medal – first place	2026 Zagreb	130 kg
FILA Test Tournament
Gold medal – first place	2011 London	120 kg
Dan Kolov & Nikola Petrov
Gold medal – first place	2007 Sofia	120 kg
Gold medal – first place	2008 Sofia	120 kg
Gold medal – first place	2018 Sofia	130 kg
World Juniors Championships
Gold medal – first place	2008 Istanbul	120 kg
Gold medal – first place	2009 Ankara	120 kg
Silver medal – second place	2007 Beijing	120 kg
European Juniors Championships
Gold medal – first place	2009 Tiflis	120 kg
Silver medal – second place	2006 Szombathely	96 kg
Bronze medal – third place	2007 Belgrad	120 kg
European Cadets Championships
Gold medal – first place	2005 Tirana	100 kg
Gold medal – first place	2006 Istanbul	100 kg

Rıza Kayaalp (pronounced [ɾɯˈza kajaˈaɫp]; born 10 October 1989) is a Turkish Greco-Roman wrestler competing in the 130 kg division. Kayaalp is a five-time world champion and 13-time European champion. He won silver at the 2016 Summer Olympics and won bronze medals at the 2012 and 2020 Summer Olympics. He is a graduate of the Aksaray University Physical Education and Sports Academy and studies his master's degree at Bozok University.

== Wrestling career ==
Kayaalp won a gold medal in Greco-Roman wrestling (120 kg division) at the 2009 Mediterranean Games. He is also a world champion, beating Mijaín López on the finals of the 2011 World Wrestling Championships in Istanbul, Turkey.

Kayaalp qualified for the 2012 Summer Olympics, where he won bronze medal at Greco-Roman style in 120 kg.

He was the flag bearer of Turkey at the opening ceremony of the 2013 Mediterranean Games, where he won the gold medal in the 120 kg division by beating Radhwen Chebbi of Tunisia 2–0.

At the 2013 European Wrestling Championships, Riza Kayaalp won a gold medal in the 120 kg division.

At the European Wrestling Championship in 2014, Kayaalp won a gold medal.

At the 2014 World Wrestling Championships, Kayaalp received a silver medal after losing to Mijain Lopez 2–0 in the final of the 130 kg Greco-Roman style division.

At the 2016 European Wrestling Championships, Kayaalp won a gold medal.

Kayaalp once again lost against his Cuban rival Mijain Lopez at the Rio de Janeiro Games. The Cuban, who lost to Kayaalp in last year's world finals, scored in only 15 seconds to essentially seal the match. He competed at the Wrestling at the 2016 Summer Olympics – Men's Greco-Roman 130 kg, winning the silver medal.

Kayaalp won a gold medal, the seventh of his career, at the 2017 European Wrestling Championships in Serbia

Kayaalp bagged the gold medal at the 2017 World Wrestling Championships in Paris. Competing in the 130 kg (286 pounds) Greco-Roman category, Kayaalp defeated his Estonian rival Heiki Nabi to become the world wrestling champion.

Kayaalp has won the gold medal at the European Wrestling Championships in Kaspiysk in Russia's northern Caucasus Republic of Dagestan. Competing in the 130 kg category, Kayaalp defeated Russian opponent Vitalii Shchur by a 2–1 score. The victory marked Kayaalp's eighth European title – seven are consecutive – equalizing another Turkish wrestling legend Hamza Yerlikaya's record.

Kayaalp became the European wrestling champion for the ninth time in the 2019 championships held in Bucharest, Romania. After defeating his Georgian rival, Iakobi Kajaia 3:0 in the finals, Kayaalp took the gold medal to become the 2019 champion in 130 kilogram category. Winning his ninth title, Kayaalp became the most decorated Turkish wrestlers in European tournaments.

Kayaalp clinched gold at 2019 World Wrestling Championships. With a 3–1 win over Oscar Pino Hinds, Kayaalp became the first Turkish Greco-Roman wrestler to have won four world titles. With his latest title Kayaalp also surpassed wrestling greats Hamza Yerlikaya and Selçuk Çebi, who have three titles in Greco-Roman wrestling each. He also equalized Hüseyin Akbaş's record in freestyle wrestling.

Kayaalp won another gold by beating his Estonian rival Heiki Nabi 3–1 in the Greco-Roman 130 kilos in China, at the International Military Sports Council (CISM) World Games, an Olympic event where soldiers compete.

Kayaalp was chosen as the 2020 Athlete of the Year at the 66th Gillette Milliyet Athlete of the Year awards.

Kayaalp clinched his 10th European wrestling title by beating Georgia's Iakobi Kajaia 3–1 in the Greco-Roman 130 kg final. Kayaalp had to wait until the final match of the day to claim his historic title. In the final, he faced Iakobi Kajaia from Georgia, the same wrestler he had defeated to win the 2019 European title. Kayaalp won the final 3–1 after scoring a takedown and one point for Kajaia's passivity. He gave up a point for his own inactivity in the second round.

Rıza Kayaalp defeated Iran's Amin Mirzazadeh to win his third Olympic medal at the 2020 Tokyo Olympics.

In 2022, he won one of the bronze medals in his event at the Vehbi Emre & Hamit Kaplan Tournament, the first United World Wrestling Ranking Series event of the year, held in Istanbul, Turkey. He won the gold medal in the men's 130 kg event at the 2022 European Wrestling Championships held in Budapest, Hungary. Kayaalp claimed a 4–0 victory over Danila Sotnikov from Italy in the 130 kg Greco-Roman division in Hungary's capital. Kayaalp won his eleventh gold medal in the 130 kg Greco-Roman division. He won the gold medal in the men's 130 kg event at the Matteo Pellicone Ranking Series 2022, the third United World Wrestling Ranking Series event of the year, held in Rome, Italy. Kayaalp claimed a 4–0 victory over Sabah Shariati from Azerbaijan in the 130 kg Greco-Roman division. Kayaalp beat Amin Mirzazadeh of Iran in men's Greco-Roman 130 kg at 2022 World Wrestling Championships in Belgrade, Serbia. Kayaalp bagged his fifth world championship as he won gold medal in men's Greco-Roman 120 kg at 2011 Istanbul and three golds in men's Greco-Roman 130 kg at 2015 Las Vegas, 2017 Paris and 2019 Nur-Sultan. He became the first Turkish wrestler to win the world championship for the 5th time. Kayaalp, said he had been battling a shoulder injury and other ailments over the past two months during his preparation for Belgrade. "Preparing for the World Championships with the injuries was very hard for me, especially in the last training camp it is very important to stay injury free," Kayaalp said. "I knew that the injuries will affect me in the final fight, so I changed my tactic a little bit. My defense is very good and we knew that."

In 2023, Rıza Kayaalp became European Champion for the 12th in Greco-Roman 130 kilogram at the 2023 European Wrestling Championships in Zagreb, Croatia. Kayaalp, 33, defeated Sabah Shariati from Azerbaijan with a 2–1 result to win the gold medal in the Croatian capital Zagreb. He reached the final with 8–0 technical victories over Boris Petrusic of Serbia, Oskar Marvik of Norway and Mantas Knystautas of Lithuania. With this gold, Kayaalp equaled Aleksandr Karelin's record of 12 European gold medals. Kayaalp won the silver medal at the 2023 World Wrestling Championships in Belgrade, the capital of Serbia, in the final match of the men's 130 kg wrestling championships in the men's greco-roman style with a 1-1 draw against his Iranian rival Amin Mirzazadeh with 7 seconds to go and lost the match due to the last point advantage of his Iranian rival. Kayaalp defeated Egyptian Abdellatif Mohamed 7-2 in the second round match, Estonian Heiki Nabi 9-0 with technical superiority in the quarterfinal match and Chinese Meng Lingzhe 3-1 in the semifinal match. With this result, Kayaalp qualified for the 2024 Summer Olympics.

He won the silver medal in the 130 kg event at the 2024 European Wrestling Championships held in Bucharest, Romania.

7 March 2025, the International Testing Agency announced that the Anti-Doping Chamber of the International Court of Arbitration for Sport has issued a 4-year ban to Kayaalp after a sample taken on 28 May 2024 was positive for the banned substance Trimetazidine. Effective 1 July 2024, he is banned from the sport for 4 years. His ban will expire on 30 June 2028. Kayaalp stated that they will appeal the decision and said, “I had a match. I was going to quit wrestling after the Olympics. I continue my struggle. After all, I am a man who retired from wrestling. We will appeal the decision. In the camp two and a half months before the Olympics, I used a medicine because my ear was ringing. That's why the punishment was given. The medicine doesn't help either. It is not a medicine that gives strength. We will appeal the decision of the Court of Arbitration for International Sport (CAS). My heart is at peace but my brain can't digest it. The sports life of such a career athlete cannot be hindered because of an ear medicine”.

At the 2026 European Wrestling Championships in Tirana, Albania, Rıza Kayaalp won the gold medal in the Greco-Roman 130 kg event by defeating Hungary's Dáriusz Vitek 7–1 in the final, thereby becoming the first wrestler to win 13 European senior titles and surpassing Aleksandr Karelin's long-standing record of 12 continental gold medals.

== Major results ==
Year	Tournament	Location	Result	Event
2026	European Championships	Tirana, Albania	1st	Greco-Roman 130 kg
2023	European Championships	Zagreb, Croatia	1st	Greco-Roman 130 kg
2022	World Championships	Belgrade, Serbia	1st	Greco-Roman 130 kg
2022	European Championships	Budapest, Hungary	1st	Greco-Roman 130 kg
2021	Summer Olympics	Tokyo, Japan	3rd	Greco-Roman 130 kg
2021	European Championships	Warsaw, Poland	1st	Greco-Roman 130 kg
2019	World Championships	Nur-Sultan, Kazakhstan	1st	Greco-Roman 130 kg
2019	European Championships	Bucharest, Romania	1st	Greco-Roman 130 kg
2019	Military World Games	Wuhan, China	1st	Greco-Roman 130 kg
2018	European Championships	Kaspiysk, Russia	1st	Greco-Roman 130 kg
2017	World Championships	Paris, France	1st	Greco-Roman 130 kg
2017	European Championships	Novi Sad, Serbia	1st	Greco-Roman 130 kg
2016	Summer Olympics	Rio de Janeiro, Brazil	2nd	Greco-Roman 130 kg
2016	European Championships	Riga, Latvia	1st	Greco-Roman 130 kg
2015	World Championships	Las Vegas, United States	1st	Greco-Roman 130 kg
2015	European Games	Baku, Azerbaijan	1st	Greco-Roman 130 kg
2014	World Championships	Tashkent, Uzbekistan	2nd	Greco-Roman 130 kg
2014	European Championships	Vantaa, Finland	1st	Greco-Roman 130 kg
2013	World Championships	Budapest, Hungary	2nd	Greco-Roman 120 kg
2013	European Championships	Belgrade, Serbia	1st	Greco-Roman 120 kg
2013	Mediterranean Games	Mersin, Turkey	1st	Greco-Roman 120 kg
2013	Summer Universiade	Kazan, Russia	1st	Greco-Roman 120 kg
2012	Summer Olympics	London, United Kingdom	3rd	Greco-Roman 120 kg
2012	European Championships	Belgrade, Serbia	1st	Greco-Roman 120 kg
2011	World Championships	Istanbul, Turkey	1st	Greco-Roman 120 kg
2011	European Championships	Dortmund, Germany	2nd	Greco-Roman 120 kg
2010	World Championships	Moscow, Russia	3rd	Greco-Roman 120 kg
2010	European Championships	Azerbaijan, Germany	1st	Greco-Roman 120 kg
2009	World Championships	Vilnius, Lithuania	3rd	Greco-Roman 120 kg
2009	Mediterranean Games	Pescara, Italy	1st	Greco-Roman 120 kg

== Wrestling record ==
Res.	Record	Opponent	Score	Date	Event	Location
Win	246–20	(Hungary) Dáriusz Vitek	7–1	2026-04-22	2026 European Championships (gold)	(Albania) Tirana
Win	245–20	Pavel Hlinchuk	4–0 DSQ	2026-04-21	2026 European Championships (gold)	(Albania) Tirana
Win	244–20	Marat Kamparov	1–1	2026-04-21	2026 European Championships (gold)	(Albania) Tirana
Win	243–20	(Armenia) Albert Vardanyan	4–0 Fall	2026-04-21	2026 European Championships (gold)	(Albania) Tirana
Win	242–20	(United States) Cohlton Schultz	7–1	2026-02-09	2026 Grand Prix Zagreb Open (gold)	(Croatia) Zagreb
Win	241–20	(Kazakhstan) Olzhas Syrlybay	4–0	2026-02-09	2026 Grand Prix Zagreb Open (gold)	(Croatia) Zagreb
Win	240–20	(Georgia (country)) Rati Talikishvili	9–0 Tech Fall	2026-02-09	2026 Grand Prix Zagreb Open (gold)	(Croatia) Zagreb
Win	239–20	(United States) Aden Attao	9–0 Tech Fall	2026-02-09	2026 Grand Prix Zagreb Open (gold)	(Croatia) Zagreb
	238–20	(Romania) Alin Alexuc-Ciurariu	Forfeit	2024-07-08	2024 Polyák Imre & Varga János	(Hungary) Budapest
Loss	238–20	(Iran) Fardin Hedayati	0–4	2024-07-08	2024 Polyák Imre & Varga János	(Hungary) Budapest
Win	238–19	(Azerbaijan) Beka Kandelaki	3–0	2024-07-08	2024 Polyák Imre & Varga János	(Hungary) Budapest
Loss	237–19	(Russia) Sergey Semenov	2–4 Fall	2024-02-13	2024 European Championships (silver)	(Romania) Bucharest
Win	237–18	(Azerbaijan) Beka Kandelaki	2–2	2024-02-12	2024 European Championships (silver)	(Romania) Bucharest
Win	236–18	(Armenia) David Ovasapyan	5–0	2024-02-12	2024 European Championships (silver)	(Romania) Bucharest
Win	235–18	(Norway) Oskar Marvik	9–0 Tech Fall	2024-02-12	2024 European Championships (silver)	(Romania) Bucharest
Loss	234–18	(Iran) Amin Mirzazadeh	2–2	2023-09-22	2023 World Championships (silver)	(Serbia) Belgrade
Win	234–17	(China) Meng Lingzhe	3–1	2023-09-21	2023 World Championships (silver)	(Serbia) Belgrade
Win	233–17	(Estonia) Heiki Nabi	9–0 Tech Fall	2023-09-21	2023 World Championships (silver)	(Serbia) Belgrade
Win	232–17	(Egypt) Abdellatif Mohamed	7–2	2023-09-21	2023 World Championships (silver)	(Serbia) Belgrade
	231–17	(Hungary) Dáriusz Vitek	Forfeit	2023-07-16	2023 Polyák Imre & Varga János	(Hungary) Budapest
	231–17	(Iran) Amir Monjazi	Forfeit	2023-07-16	2023 Polyák Imre & Varga János	(Hungary) Budapest
Win	231–17	(Romania) Alin Alexuc-Ciurariu	8–1	2023-07-16	2023 Polyák Imre & Varga János	(Hungary) Budapest
Win	230–17	(Azerbaijan) Sabah Shariati	2–1	2023-04-22	2023 European Championships (gold)	(Croatia) Zagreb
Win	229–17	(Lithuania) Mantas Knystautas	8–0 Tech Fall	2023-04-21	2023 European Championships (gold)	(Croatia) Zagreb
Win	228–17	(Norway) Oskar Marvik	8–0 Tech Fall	2023-04-21	2023 European Championships (gold)	(Croatia) Zagreb
Win	227–17	(Serbia) Boris Petrušić	8–0 Tech Fall	2023-04-21	2023 European Championships (gold)	(Croatia) Zagreb
Win	226–17	(Iran) Amin Mirzazadeh	1–1	2022-09-13	2022 World Championships (gold)	(Serbia) Belgrade
Win	225–17	(Uzbekistan) Muminjon Abdullaev	5–3	2022-09-12	2022 World Championships (gold)	(Serbia) Belgrade
Win	224–17	(Romania) Alin Alexuc-Ciurariu	8–0 Tech Fall	2022-09-12	2022 World Championships (gold)	(Serbia) Belgrade
Win	223–17	(Ukraine) Oleksandr Chernetskyi	5–1	2022-09-12	2022 World Championships (gold)	(Serbia) Belgrade
Win	222–17	(Azerbaijan) Sabah Shariati	4–0	2022-06-22	Matteo Pellicone 2022 (gold)	(Italy) Rome
Win	221–17	(Norway) Oskar Marvik	2–1	2022-06-22	Matteo Pellicone 2022 (gold)	(Italy) Rome
Win	220–17	(Lithuania) Mantas Knystautas	3–1	2022-06-22	Matteo Pellicone 2022 (gold)	(Italy) Rome
Win	219–17	(Italy) Danila Sotnikov	4–0	2022-04-02	2022 European Championships (gold)	(Hungary) Budapest
Win	218–17	(Azerbaijan) Beka Kandelaki	1–1	2022-04-01	2022 European Championships (gold)	(Hungary) Budapest
Win	217–17	(Hungary) Dáriusz Vitek	6–0	2022-04-01	2022 European Championships (gold)	(Hungary) Budapest
Win	216–17	(Romania) Alin Alexuc-Ciurariu	9–0 Tech Fall	2022-04-01	2022 European Championships (gold)	(Hungary) Budapest
Win	215–17	(Poland) Rafal Krajewski	8–0 Tech Fall	2022-02-24	Vehbi Emre & Hamit Kaplan 2022 (bronze)	(Turkey) Istanbul
Loss	214–17	(Azerbaijan) Beka Kandelaki	5–2 Fall	2022-02-24	Vehbi Emre & Hamit Kaplan 2022 (bronze)	(Turkey) Istanbul
Win	214–16	(Kazakhstan) Anton Savenko	4–1	2022-02-24	Vehbi Emre & Hamit Kaplan 2022 (bronze)	(Turkey) Istanbul
Win	213–16	(Iran) Amin Mirzazadeh	7–2	2021-08-02	2020 Summer Olympics (bronze)	(Japan) Tokyo
Loss	212–16	(Cuba) Mijaín López	0–2	2021-08-01	2020 Summer Olympics (bronze)	(Japan) Tokyo
Win	212–15	(Germany) Eduard Popp	6–2	2021-08-01	2020 Summer Olympics (bronze)	(Japan) Tokyo
Win	211–15	(Lithuania) Mantas Knystautas	5–1	2021-08-01	2020 Summer Olympics (bronze)	(Japan) Tokyo
Win	210–15	(Georgia (country)) Iakob Kajaia	3–1	2021-04-19	2021 European Wrestling Championships (gold)	(Poland) Warsaw
Win	209–15	(Germany) Eduard Popp	5–0 Fall	2021-04-19	2021 European Wrestling Championships (gold)	(Poland) Warsaw
Win	208–15	(Romania) Alin Alexuc-Ciurariu	8–0 Tech Fall	2021-04-19	2021 European Wrestling Championships (gold)	(Poland) Warsaw
Win	207–15	(Ukraine) Oleksandr Chernetskyi	10–1 Tech Fall	2021-04-19	2021 European Wrestling Championships (gold)	(Poland) Warsaw
Win	206–15	(Egypt) Abdellatif Mohamed	7–0	2021-03-04	Matteo Pellicone 2021 (gold)	(Italy) Rome
Win	205–15	(Russia) Zurabi Gedekhauri	8–0 Tech Fall	2021-03-04	Matteo Pellicone 2021 (gold)	(Italy) Rome
Win	204–15	(Chile) Yasmani Acosta	2–0	2021-03-04	Matteo Pellicone 2021 (gold)	(Italy) Rome
Win	203–15	(Kazakhstan) Mansur Shadukayev	4–2	2021-03-04	Matteo Pellicone 2021 (gold)	(Italy) Rome
Win	202–15	(Croatia) Marko Koscevic	9–0 Tech Fall	2019-10-23	2020 Grand Prix Zagreb Open (gold)	(Croatia) Zagreb
Win	201–15	(Serbia) Boban Zivanovic	8–0 Tech Fall	2019-10-23	2020 Grand Prix Zagreb Open (gold)	(Croatia) Zagreb
Win	200–15	(Croatia) Ante Milković	9–0 Tech Fall	2019-10-23	2020 Grand Prix Zagreb Open (gold)	(Croatia) Zagreb
Loss	199–15	(Ukraine) Mykola Kuchmii	1–5	2020-02-10	2020 European Wrestling Championships	(Italy) Rome
Win	199–14	(Hungary) Adam Varga	6–0	2020-02-10	2020 European Wrestling Championships	(Italy) Rome
Win	198–14	(Estonia) Heiki Nabi	6–2	2019-10-23	2019 Military World Games (gold)	(China) Wuhan
Win	197–14	(Ukraine) Oleksandr Chernetskyi	13–0 Tech Fall	2019-10-23	2019 Military World Games (gold)	(China) Wuhan
Win	196–14	(Germany) Eduard Popp	8–2	2019-10-23	2019 Military World Games (gold)	(China) Wuhan
Win	195–14	(Iran) Amin Mirzazadeh	8–3	2019-10-23	2019 Military World Games (gold)	(China) Wuhan
Win	194–14	(Cuba) Óscar Pino	3–1	2019-09-14	2019 World Wrestling Championships (gold)	(Kazakhstan) Nur-Sultan
Win	193–14	(Germany) Eduard Popp	4–1	2019-09-14	2019 World Wrestling Championships (gold)	(Kazakhstan) Nur-Sultan
Win	192–14	(Georgia (country)) Iakob Kajaia	5–1	2019-09-14	2019 World Wrestling Championships (gold)	(Kazakhstan) Nur-Sultan
Win	191–14	(China) Meng Lingzhe	4–0	2019-09-14	2019 World Wrestling Championships (gold)	(Kazakhstan) Nur-Sultan
Win	190–14	(Chile) Yasmani Acosta	4–0	2019-09-14	2019 World Wrestling Championships (gold)	(Kazakhstan) Nur-Sultan
Win	189–14	(Georgia (country)) Iakob Kajaia	3–0	2019-04-12	2019 European Wrestling Championships (gold)	(Romania) Bucharest
Win	188–14	(Estonia) Heiki Nabi	4–0	2019-04-12	2019 European Wrestling Championships (gold)	(Romania) Bucharest
Win	187–14	(Romania) Alin Alexuc-Ciurariu	5–0	2019-04-12	2019 European Wrestling Championships (gold)	(Romania) Bucharest
Win	186–14	(Azerbaijan) Sabah Shariati	5–0	2019-04-12	2019 European Wrestling Championships (gold)	(Romania) Bucharest
Win	185–14	(Croatia) Ante Milković	5–0 Fall	2019-04-12	2019 European Wrestling Championships (gold)	(Romania) Bucharest
Loss	184–14	(Estonia) Heiki Nabi	1–2	2018-10-25	2018 World Wrestling Championships	(Hungary) Budapest
Win	184–13	(Belarus) Kiril Grishchenko	5–2	2018-07-20	2018 Vehbi Emre & Hamit Kaplan Tournament (gold)	(Turkey) Istanbul
Win	183–13	(Belarus) Ioseb Chugoshvili	4–2	2018-07-20	2018 Vehbi Emre & Hamit Kaplan Tournament (gold)	(Turkey) Istanbul
Win	182–13	(Ukraine) Mykola Kuchmii	6–0	2018-07-20	2018 Vehbi Emre & Hamit Kaplan Tournament (gold)	(Turkey) Istanbul
Win	181–13	(Japan) Arata Sonoda	8–0 Tech Fall	2018-07-20	2018 Vehbi Emre & Hamit Kaplan Tournament (gold)	(Turkey) Istanbul
Win	180–13	(Russia) Vitalii Shchur	2–1	2018-04-30	2018 European Wrestling Championships (gold)	(Russia) Kaspiysk
Win	179–13	(Romania) Alin Alexuc-Ciurariu	4–0	2018-04-30	2018 European Wrestling Championships (gold)	(Russia) Kaspiysk
Win	178–13	(Belarus) Georgi Chugoshvili	5–0	2018-04-30	2018 European Wrestling Championships (gold)	(Russia) Kaspiysk
Win	177–13	(Hungary) Bálint Lám	9–0 Tech Fall	2018-04-30	2018 European Wrestling Championships (gold)	(Russia) Kaspiysk
Win	176–13	(Georgia (country)) Zviadi Pataridze	5–0	2018-03-22	2018 Dan Kolov & Nikola Petrov Tournament (gold)	(Bulgaria) Sofia
Win	175–13	(Romania) Constantin Hutuleac	9–0 Tech Fall	2018-03-22	2018 Dan Kolov & Nikola Petrov Tournament (gold)	(Bulgaria) Sofia
Win	174–13	(Serbia) Boban Zivanovic	10–1 Tech Fall	2018-03-22	2018 Dan Kolov & Nikola Petrov Tournament (gold)	(Bulgaria) Sofia
Win	174–12	(Romania) Alin Alexuc-Ciurariu	9–0 Tech Fall	2018-03-22	2018 Dan Kolov & Nikola Petrov Tournament (gold)	(Bulgaria) Sofia
Win	173–12	(Estonia) Heiki Nabi	2–1	2017-08-21	2017 World Wrestling Championships (gold)	(France) Paris
Win	172–12	(Cuba) Óscar Pino	2–1	2017-08-21	2017 World Wrestling Championships (gold)	(France) Paris
Win	171–12	(Belarus) Kiryl Hryshchanka	3–1	2017-08-21	2017 World Wrestling Championships (gold)	(France) Paris
Win	170–12	(Uzbekistan) Muminjon Abdullaev	2–0	2017-08-21	2017 World Wrestling Championships (gold)	(France) Paris
Win	169–12	(Hungary) Bálint Lám	4–3	2017-05-06	2017 European Wrestling Championships (gold)	(Serbia) Novi Sad
Win	168–12	(Germany) Christian John	7–0 Fall	2017-05-06	2017 European Wrestling Championships (gold)	(Serbia) Novi Sad
Win	167–12	(Georgia (country)) Levan Arabuli	3–1	2017-05-06	2017 European Wrestling Championships (gold)	(Serbia) Novi Sad
Win	166–12	(Slovakia) Tamas Soos	8–0 Tech Fall	2017-05-06	2017 European Wrestling Championships (gold)	(Serbia) Novi Sad
Win	165–12	(Uzbekistan) Muminjon Abdullaev	9–0 Tech Fall	2017-03-04	2017 Vehbi Emre & Hamit Kaplan Tournament (gold)	(Turkey) Istanbul
Win	164–12	(Bulgaria) Miloslav Metodiev	2–1	2017-03-04	2017 Vehbi Emre & Hamit Kaplan Tournament (gold)	(Turkey) Istanbul
Win	163–12	(Turkey) Osman Yıldırım	3–0	2017-03-04	2017 Vehbi Emre & Hamit Kaplan Tournament (gold)	(Turkey) Istanbul
Win	162–12	(Georgia (country)) Sandro Dikhaminjia	4–1	2017-03-04	2017 Vehbi Emre & Hamit Kaplan Tournament (gold)	(Turkey) Istanbul
Loss	161–12	(Cuba) Mijaín López	0–6	2016-08-14	2016 Summer Olympics (silver)	(Brazil) Rio de Janeiro
Win	161–11	(Germany) Eduard Popp	8–0 Tech Fall	2016-08-14	2016 Summer Olympics (silver)	(Brazil) Rio de Janeiro
Win	160–11	(Azerbaijan) Sabah Shariati	5–0 Fall	2016-08-14	2016 Summer Olympics (silver)	(Brazil) Rio de Janeiro
Win	159–11	(Venezuela) Erwin Caraballo	8–0 Tech Fall	2016-08-14	2016 Summer Olympics (silver)	(Brazil) Rio de Janeiro
Win	158–11	(Russia) Vitalii Shchur	8–2	2016-07-02	2016 Grand Prix of Germany (gold)	(Germany) Dortmund
Win	157–11	(Germany) Eduard Popp	6–0	2016-07-02	2016 Grand Prix of Germany (gold)	(Germany) Dortmund
Win	156–11	(Lithuania) Mantas Knystautas	5–2	2016-07-02	2016 Grand Prix of Germany (gold)	(Germany) Dortmund
Win	155–11	(Uzbekistan) Mumindan Abdullaev	5–0	2016-07-02	2016 Grand Prix of Germany (gold)	(Germany) Dortmund
Win	154–11	(Ukraine) Oleksandr Chernetskyi	2–2 Fall	2016-03-12	2016 European Wrestling Championships (gold)	(Latvia) Riga
Win	153–11	(Sweden) Johan Euren	4–2	2016-03-12	2016 European Wrestling Championships (gold)	(Latvia) Riga
Win	152–11	(Russia) Vitalii Shchur	3–1	2016-03-12	2016 European Wrestling Championships (gold)	(Latvia) Riga
Win	151–11	(Bulgaria) Lyubomir Dimitrov	8–0 Tech Fall	2016-03-12	2016 European Wrestling Championships (gold)	(Latvia) Riga
Win	150–11	(Cuba) Mijaín López	1–0	2015-09-07	2015 World Wrestling Championships (gold)	(United States) Las Vegas
Win	149–11	(Azerbaijan) Sabah Shariati	6–0	2015-09-07	2015 World Wrestling Championships (gold)	(United States) Las Vegas
Win	148–11	(Ukraine) Oleksandr Chernetskyi	8–0 Tech Fall	2015-09-07	2015 World Wrestling Championships (gold)	(United States) Las Vegas
Win	147–11	(Austria) Lukas Hörmann	8–0 Tech Fall	2015-09-07	2015 World Wrestling Championships (gold)	(United States) Las Vegas
Win	146–11	(Belarus) Ioseb Chugoshvili	2–0	2015-09-07	2015 World Wrestling Championships (gold)	(United States) Las Vegas
Win	145–11	(Azerbaijan) Sabah Shariati	3–1	2015-06-13	2015 European Games (gold)	(Azerbaijan) Baku
Win	144–11	(Estonia) Heiki Nabi	7–0	2015-06-13	2015 European Games (gold)	(Azerbaijan) Baku
Win	143–11	(Russia) Sergey Semenov	3–0	2015-06-13	2015 European Games (gold)	(Azerbaijan) Baku
Win	142–11	(Hungary) Bálint Lám	2–0 Fall	2015-06-13	2015 European Games (gold)	(Azerbaijan) Baku
Win	141–11	(Turkey) Ali Nail Arslan	2–0	2015-04-04	2015 Vehbi Emre & Hamit Kaplan Tournament (gold)	(Turkey) Istanbul
Win	140–11	(Iran) Behnam Mehdizadeh	3–0	2015-04-04	2015 Vehbi Emre & Hamit Kaplan Tournament (gold)	(Turkey) Istanbul
Win	139–11	(Belarus) Kirill Hryschenko	4–0	2015-04-04	2015 Vehbi Emre & Hamit Kaplan Tournament (gold)	(Turkey) Istanbul
Win	138–11	(Georgia (country)) Guram Pherselidze	4–0	2015-04-04	2015 Vehbi Emre & Hamit Kaplan Tournament (gold)	(Turkey) Istanbul
Win	137–11	(Lithuania) Mindaugas Mizgaitis	6–0	2015-04-04	2015 Vehbi Emre & Hamit Kaplan Tournament (gold)	(Turkey) Istanbul
Loss	136–11	(Cuba) Mijaín López	0–2	2014-09-08	2014 World Wrestling Championships (silver)	(Uzbekistan) Tashkent
Win	136–10	(Bulgaria) Lyubomir Dimitrov	4–0 Fall	2014-09-08	2014 World Wrestling Championships (silver)	(Uzbekistan) Tashkent
Win	135–10	(Estonia) Heiki Nabi	4–0	2014-09-08	2014 World Wrestling Championships (silver)	(Uzbekistan) Tashkent
Win	134–10	(Hungary) Balint Lam	4–0	2014-09-08	2014 World Wrestling Championships (silver)	(Uzbekistan) Tashkent
Win	133–10	(Bulgaria) Lyubomir Dimitrov	9–0 Tech Fall	2014-04-01	2014 European Wrestling Championships (gold)	(Finland) Vantaa
Win	132–10	(Russia) Vasily Parshin	9–0 Tech Fall	2014-04-01	2014 European Wrestling Championships (gold)	(Finland) Vantaa
Win	131–10	(Lithuania) Mindaugas Mizgaitis	3–3 Fall	2014-04-01	2014 European Wrestling Championships (gold)	(Finland) Vantaa
Win	130–10	(Ukraine) Oleksandr Chernetskyi	2–0	2014-04-01	2014 European Wrestling Championships (gold)	(Finland) Vantaa
Win	129–10	(Turkey) Atilla Güzel	5–0	2014-02-01	2014 Vehbi Emre Tournament (gold)	(Turkey) Istanbul
Win	128–10	(Turkey) Bayram Nigar	8–0 Tech Fall	2014-02-01	2014 Vehbi Emre Tournament (gold)	(Turkey) Istanbul
Win	127–10	(Turkey) Emin Öztürk	2–0	2014-02-01	2014 Vehbi Emre Tournament (gold)	(Turkey) Istanbul
Win	126–10	(Bulgaria) Miloslav Metodiev	5–0	2014-02-01	2014 Vehbi Emre Tournament (gold)	(Turkey) Istanbul
Win	125–10	(Turkey) Osman Yıldırım	8–0 Tech Fall	2014-02-01	2014 Vehbi Emre Tournament (gold)	(Turkey) Istanbul
Win	124–10	(Sweden) Johan Eurén	5–1	2013-07-15	2013 World Wrestling Championships (silver)	(Hungary) Budapest
Win	123–10	(Iran) Amir Aliakbari	1–4 Disq, Dop.	2013-07-15	2013 World Wrestling Championships (silver)	(Hungary) Budapest
Win	122–10	(United States) Robby Smith	7–0	2013-07-15	2013 World Wrestling Championships (silver)	(Hungary) Budapest
Win	121–10	(Russia) Sergey Andrusik	3–0	2013-07-15	2013 World Wrestling Championships (silver)	(Hungary) Budapest
Win	120–10	(India) Naveen Kumar	4–0 Fall	2013-07-15	2013 World Wrestling Championships (silver)	(Hungary) Budapest
Win	119–10	(Iran) Amir Aliakbari	5–1	2013-07-15	World University Games (gold)	(Russia) Kazan
Win	118–10	(Kazakhstan) Nurmakhan Tinaliyev	7–3	2013-07-15	World University Games (gold)	(Russia) Kazan
Win	117–10	(Russia) Sergey Andrusik	4–4 Fall	2013-07-15	World University Games (gold)	(Russia) Kazan
Win	116–10	(Azerbaijan) Abas Abdullaev	2–1	2013-07-15	World University Games (gold)	(Russia) Kazan
Win	115–10	(Tajikistan) Nevruz Arabov	8–0 Tech Fall	2013-07-15	World University Games (gold)	(Russia) Kazan
Win	114–10	(Tunisia) Radhouane Chebbi	8–0 Tech Fall	2013-06-20	2013 Mediterranean Games (gold)	(Turkey) Mersin
Win	113–10	(Egypt) Mohamed Mohamed	7–1	2013-06-20	2013 Mediterranean Games (gold)	(Turkey) Mersin
Win	112–10	(Greece) Nikolaos Leon	8–0 Tech Fall	2013-06-20	2013 Mediterranean Games (gold)	(Turkey) Mersin
Win	111–10	(Ukraine) Evgeni Orlov	3–0	2013-03-19	European Championship (gold)	(Georgia (country)) Tbilisi
Win	110–10	(Georgia (country)) Guram Pherselidze	5–1	2013-03-19	European Championship (gold)	(Georgia (country)) Tbilisi
Win	109–10	(Belarus) Ioseb Chugoshvili	3–0	2013-03-19	European Championship (gold)	(Georgia (country)) Tbilisi
Win	108–10	(Azerbaijan) Radomir Petković	3–0	2013-03-19	European Championship (gold)	(Georgia (country)) Tbilisi
Win	107–10	(Belarus) Ioseb Chugoshvili	6–0	2013-02-02	2013 Vehbi Emre Tournament (gold)	(Turkey) Istanbul
Win	106–10	(Iran) Mahdi Nouri	4-0	2013-02-02	2013 Vehbi Emre Tournament (gold)	(Turkey) Istanbul
Win	105–10	(Russia) Alikhan Ayubov	5–0	2013-02-02	2013 Vehbi Emre Tournament (gold)	(Turkey) Istanbul
Win	104–10	(Georgia (country)) Levan Arabuli	4-0 Fall	2013-02-02	2013 Vehbi Emre Tournament (gold)	(Turkey) Istanbul
Win	103–10	(Georgia (country)) Guram Pherselidze	2–0	2012-08-05	2012 Summer Olympics (bronze)	(United Kingdom) London
Loss	102–10	(Cuba) Mijaín López	0–3	2012-08-05	2012 Summer Olympics (bronze)	(United Kingdom) London
Win	102–9	(United States) Dremiel Byers	3–0	2012-08-05	2012 Summer Olympics (bronze)	(United Kingdom) London
Win	101–9	(Ukraine) Evgeni Orlov	3–0	2012-08-05	2012 Summer Olympics (bronze)	(United Kingdom) London
Win	100–9	(South Korea) Yongmin Kim	8–0 Tech Fall	2012-05-19	World Cup (gold)	(Russia) Saransk
Win	99–9	(Hungary) Bálint Lám	4 : 1 (2:1)	2012-05-19	World Cup (gold)	(Russia) Saransk
Win	98–9	(Armenia) Vachagan Yeghiazaryan	6–0 (4–0)	2012-05-19	World Cup (gold)	(Russia) Saransk
Win	97–9	(Azerbaijan) Zaur Mehraliev	3–1 (2–0)	2012-05-19	World Cup (gold)	(Russia) Saransk
Win	96–9	(Russia) Khasan Baroev	5–0 (2–0)	2012-03-06	2012 European Championship (gold)	(Serbia) Belgrade
Win	95–9	(Hungary) Mihály Deák-Bárdos	3–0 (2–0)	2012-03-06	2012 European Championship (gold)	(Serbia) Belgrade
Win	94–9	(Belarus) Ioseb Chugoshvili	3–0 (2–0)	2012-03-06	2012 European Championship (gold)	(Serbia) Belgrade
Win	93–9	(Georgia (country)) Guram Pherselidze	5–0 (2–0)	2012-03-06	2012 European Championship (gold)	(Serbia) Belgrade
Win	92–9	(Armenia) Yury Patrikeyev	3–1	2012-03-06	2012 European Championship (gold)	(Serbia) Belgrade
Win	91–9	(Greece) Xenofon Koutsioumpas	6–0	2011-12-10	FILA Test Tournament (gold)	(United Kingdom) London
Win	90–9	(Poland) Łukasz Banak	7–4	2011-12-10	FILA Test Tournament (gold)	(United Kingdom) London
Win	89–9	(Estonia) Marijus Grygelis	4–2	2011-12-10	FILA Test Tournament (gold)	(United Kingdom) London
Win	88–9	(France) Yannick Szczepaniak	5–0	2011-12-10	FILA Test Tournament (gold)	(United Kingdom) London
Win	87–9	(Cuba) Mijaín López	4–0	2011-09-12	World Championship (gold)	(Turkey) Istanbul
Win	86–9	(Kazakhstan) Nurmakhan Tinaliyev	6–3	2011-09-12	World Championship (gold)	(Turkey) Istanbul
Win	85–9	(Hungary) Mihály Deák-Bárdos	5–0	2011-09-12	World Championship (gold)	(Turkey) Istanbul
Win	84–9	(Bulgaria) Ivan Ivanov	4–0	2011-09-12	World Championship (gold)	(Turkey) Istanbul
Win	83–9	(Tunisia) Redhouane Chebbi	5-0-(3–0)	2011-09-12	World Championship (gold)	(Turkey) Istanbul
Win	82–9	(Hungary) Mihály Deák-Bárdos	3 : 0 (2:0)	2010-04-17	Golden Grand Prix (gold)	(Azerbaijan) Baku
Win	81–9	(United States) Dremiel Byers	3 : 1 (2:1)	2010-04-17	Golden Grand Prix (gold)	(Azerbaijan) Baku
Win	80–9	(Estonia) Heiki Nabi	3 : 0 (2:0)	2010-04-17	Golden Grand Prix (gold)	(Azerbaijan) Baku
Win	79–9	(Georgia (country)) Dimitri Javakhishvili	3 : 0 (2:0)	2010-04-17	Golden Grand Prix (gold)	(Azerbaijan) Baku
Loss	78–9	(Russia) Khasan Baroev	1–3	2011-04-02	2011 European Championship (silver)	(Germany) Dortmund
Win	78–8	(Armenia) Yury Patrikeyev	7-0	2011-04-02	2011 European Championship (silver)	(Germany) Dortmund
Win	77–8	(Germany) Nico Schmidt	3–0	2011-04-02	2011 European Championship (silver)	(Germany) Dortmund
Win	76–8	(Sweden) Johan Eurén	3–0	2011-04-02	2011 European Championship (silver)	(Germany) Dortmund
Win	75–8	(Slovakia) David Lengyel	6–0	2011-04-02	2011 European Championship (silver)	(Germany) Dortmund
Win	74–8	(Kazakhstan) Nurmakhan Tinaliyev	3–1	2011-02-19	World Cup (gold)	(Belarus) Minsk
Win	73–8	(Iran) Bashir Babajanzadeh	7–4	2011-02-19	World Cup (gold)	(Belarus) Minsk
Win	72–8	(Armenia) Vachagan Yeghiazaryan	11–1 Tech Fall	2011-02-19	World Cup (gold)	(Belarus) Minsk
Win	71–8	(Iran) Bashir Babajanzadeh	3–0	2011-01-29	2011 Vehbi Emre Tournament (gold)	(Turkey) Istanbul
Win	70–8	(Turkey) Atilla Güzel	5–5	2011-01-29	2011 Vehbi Emre Tournament (gold)	(Turkey) Istanbul
Win	69–8	(Kazakhstan) Yessengeldy Zhalgasbaev	5–0	2011-01-29	2011 Vehbi Emre Tournament (gold)	(Turkey) Istanbul
Win	68–8	(Iran) Amir Ghasemi Monjazi	7–0	2010-10-26	Golden Grand Prix (gold)	(Italy) Turin
Win	67–8	(Ukraine) Igor Didyk	8–0 Tech Fall	2010-10-26	Golden Grand Prix (gold)	(Italy) Turin
Win	66–8	(Russia) Vladimir Sariev	5–2	2010-10-26	Golden Grand Prix (gold)	(Italy) Turin
Win	65–8	(United States) Dremiel Byers	4–0	2010-09-06	2010 World Championships (bronze)	(Russia) Moscow
Win	64–8	(Sweden) Johan Eurén	3–0	2010-09-06	2010 World Championships (bronze)	(Russia) Moscow
Win	63–8	(India) Dalal Dharmender	3–0	2010-09-06	2010 World Championships (bronze)	(Russia) Moscow
Loss	62–8	(Armenia) Yury Patrikeyev	0–5	2010-09-06	2010 World Championships (bronze)	(Russia) Moscow
Win	62–7	(Hungary) Mihály Deák-Bárdos	3–0	2010-09-06	2010 World Championships (bronze)	(Russia) Moscow
Win	61–7	(Iran) Babak Ghorbani	6–0	2010-07-16	Golden Grand Prix (gold)	(Azerbaijan) Baku
Win	60–7	(Hungary) Mihály Deák-Bárdos	6–1	2010-07-16	Golden Grand Prix (gold)	(Azerbaijan) Baku
Win	59–7	(Georgia (country)) Otari Bolkvadze	8–0 Tech Fall	2010-07-16	Golden Grand Prix (gold)	(Azerbaijan) Baku
Win	58–7	(Serbia) Radomir Petković	5:0 (1:0)6:0	2010-04-17	2010 European Championship (gold)	(Azerbaijan) Baku
Win	57–7	(Lithuania) Mindaugas Mizgaitis	3 : 0 (2:0)	2010-04-17	2010 European Championship (gold)	(Azerbaijan) Baku
Win	56–7	(Georgia (country)) Dimitri Javakhshvili	3 : 0 (2:0)	2010-04-17	2010 European Championship (gold)	(Azerbaijan) Baku
Win	55–7	(Bulgaria) Ivan Ivanov	0 : 3 (0:2)	2010-04-17	2010 European Championship (gold)	(Azerbaijan) Baku
Win	54–7	(Serbia) Radomir Petković	7–0	2010-03-06	Golden Grand Prix	(Hungary) Szombathely
Win	53–7	(Russia) Shokhruddi Ayubov	9–1 Tech Fall	2010-03-06	Golden Grand Prix	(Hungary) Szombathely
Win	52–7	(Poland) Łukasz Banak	9–3	2010-03-06	Golden Grand Prix	(Hungary) Szombathely
Loss	51–7	(Armenia) Yury Patrikeyev	1–4 Fall	2010-02-13	World Cup	(Armenia) Yerevan
Win	51–6	(Russia) Aleksandr Anuchin	6–3	2010-02-13	World Cup	(Armenia) Yerevan
Win	50–6	(Iran) Bashir Babajanzadeh	7–0	2010-02-13	World Cup	(Armenia) Yerevan
Win	49–6	(Turkey) İsmail Güzel	3–1	2010-01-30	2010 Vehbi Emre Tournament (gold)	(Turkey) Istanbul
Win	48–6	(Iran) Mohammad Ghorbani	7–3	2010-01-30	2010 Vehbi Emre Tournament (gold)	(Turkey) Istanbul
Win	47–6	(Poland) Łukasz Banak	11–0 Tech Fall	2010-01-30	2010 Vehbi Emre Tournament (gold)	(Turkey) Istanbul
Win	46–6	(Belarus) Ioseb Chugoshvili	0:3 (0:2)	2009-09-25	2009 World Championship	(Denmark) Herning
Loss	45–6	(Cuba) Mijaín López	0-3	2009-09-25	2009 World Championship	(Denmark) Herning
Win	45–5	(Russia) Aleksander Anuchin	5–0	2009-09-25	2009 World Championship	(Denmark) Herning
Win	44–5	(Armenia) Yury Patrikeyev	2–0	2009-09-25	2009 World Championship	(Denmark) Herning
Win	43–5	(India) Dalal Dharmender	PO 3 : 0 (2:0)	2009-09-25	2009 World Championship	(Denmark) Herning
Win	42–5	(Russia) Vladimir Ilnitski	3–0	2009-08-04	2009 World Junior Wrestling Championships	(Turkey) Ankara
Win	41–5	(Iran) Bashir Babajanzadeh	2–0	2009-08-04	2009 World Junior Wrestling Championships	(Turkey) Ankara
Win	40–5	(Georgia (country)) Shota Gogisvanidze	8–0 Tech Fall	2009-08-04	2009 World Junior Wrestling Championships	(Turkey) Ankara
Win	39–5	(United States) Peter Kowalczuk	6–0	2009-08-04	2009 World Junior Wrestling Championships	(Turkey) Ankara
Win	38–5	(Russia) David Oganesyan	8–0 Tech Fall	2009-06-30	European Championship	(Georgia (country)) Tbilisi
Win	37–5	(Germany) Eduard Popp	6–0	2009-06-30	European Championship	(Georgia (country)) Tbilisi
Win	36–5	(Lithuania) Marijus Grygelis	11–0 Tech Fall	2009-06-30	European Championship	(Georgia (country)) Tbilisi
Win	35–5	(Armenia) Vachagan Yeghiazaryan	10–0 Tech Fall	2009-06-30	European Championship	(Georgia (country)) Tbilisi
Win	34–5	(Greece) Panagiotis Papadopoulos	7–0 Fall	2009-06-25	2009 Mediterranean Games (gold)	(Italy) Pescara
Win	33–5	(Italy) Daniele Ficara	11–0 Tech Fall	2009-06-25	2009 Mediterranean Games (gold)	(Italy) Pescara
Win	32–5	(Syria) Akil Al-Fahli	11–0 Tech Fall	2009-06-25	2009 Mediterranean Games (gold)	(Italy) Pescara
Loss	31–5	(Russia) Aleksander Anuchin	0–2	2009-04-04	2009 European Championship,	(Lithuania) Vilnius
Win	31–4	(Georgia (country)) Guram Pherselidze	3–1	2009-04-04	2009 European Championship,	(Lithuania) Vilnius
Loss	30–4	(Lithuania) Mindaugas Mizgaitis	2–4	2008-08-12	2008 Olympic Games	(China) Beijing
Win	30–3	(Iran) Bashir Babajanzadeh	4–1	2008-07-29	2008 World Junior Wrestling Championships	(Turkey) Istanbul
Win	29–3	(United States) Peter Kowalczuk	12–0 Tech Fall	2008-07-29	2008 World Junior Wrestling Championships	(Turkey) Istanbul
Win	28–3	(Kyrgyzstan) Murat Ramonov	13–0 Tech Fall	2008-07-29	2008 World Junior Wrestling Championships	(Turkey) Istanbul
Win	27–3	(Georgia (country)) Ramin Shakarishvili	6–1	2008-07-29	2008 World Junior Wrestling Championships	(Turkey) Istanbul
Win	26–3	(United States) Peter Kowalczuk	12–0 Tech Fall	2008-07-29	2008 World Junior Wrestling Championships	(Turkey) Istanbul
Win	25–3	(Bulgaria) Ivan Ivanov	7–0	2008-07-05	Dan Kolov & Nikola Petrov Tournament	(Bulgaria) Sofia
Win	24–3	(Romania) Cesar Faghian	8–0 Tech Fall	2008-07-05	Dan Kolov & Nikola Petrov Tournament	(Bulgaria) Sofia
Win	23–3	(Georgia (country)) Guram Pherselidze	3–0	2008-06-27	Golden Grand Prix	(Azerbaijan) Baku
Win	22–3	(Turkey) Atilla Güzel	4–3	2008-06-27	Golden Grand Prix	(Azerbaijan) Baku
Win	21–3	(Azerbaijan) Jalal Bahadurov	9–1 Tech Fall	2008-06-27	Golden Grand Prix	(Azerbaijan) Baku
Loss	20–3	(Russia) Soslan Farniev	3–4	2007-08-21	2007 World Junior Wrestling Championships	(China) Beijing
Win	20–2	(Ukraine) Artem Tsepovatenko	7–1	2007-08-21	2007 World Junior Wrestling Championships	(China) Beijing
Win	19–2	(Belarus) Vitali Sivakov	FALL 9–1 Tech Fall	2007-08-21	2007 World Junior Wrestling Championships	(China) Beijing
Win	18–2	(Kazakhstan) Abdulmalik Sartbaev	FALL 8–2	2007-08-21	2007 World Junior Wrestling Championships	(China) Beijing
Win	17–2	(France) Yannick Szczepaniak	10–1 Tech Fall	2007-08-04	Dan Kolov & Nikola Petrov Tournament	(Bulgaria) Sofia
Win	16–2	(Turkey) Yekta Güzel	11–5	2007-08-04	Dan Kolov & Nikola Petrov Tournament	(Bulgaria) Sofia
Win	15–2	(Iran) Mehdi Sharabiani	3–1	2007-08-04	Dan Kolov & Nikola Petrov Tournament	(Bulgaria) Sofia
Win	14–2	(Hungary) Madis Sihimets	3–1	2007-06-26	2007 European Juniors Wrestling Championships	(Serbia) Belgrade
Win	13–2	(Georgia (country)) Dimitri Javakhishvili	6–1	2007-06-26	2007 European Juniors Wrestling Championships	(Serbia) Belgrade
Loss	12–2	(Russia) Soslan Farniev	Injury	2007-06-26	2007 European Juniors Wrestling Championships	(Serbia) Belgrade
Win	12–1	(Greece) Antonios Vousourelis	13–3 Tech Fall	2007-06-26	2007 European Juniors Wrestling Championships	(Serbia) Belgrade
Win	11–1	(Poland) Wojciech Zieziulewicz	5–1	2006-07-25	2006 European Cadets Wrestling Championships	(Turkey) Istanbul
Win	10–1	(Russia) Stavris Khadzhiev	6–0	2006-07-25	2006 European Cadets Wrestling Championships	(Turkey) Istanbul
Win	9–1	(Slovakia) David Tergyei	4–0	2006-07-25	2006 European Cadets Wrestling Championships	(Turkey) Istanbul
Win	8–1	(Greece) Anastasios Bratsiotis	10–1 Tech Fall	2006-07-25	2006 European Cadets Wrestling Championships	(Turkey) Istanbul
Loss	7–1	(Hungary) Ivan Nemeth	Disq.	2006-07-04	2006 European Juniors Wrestling Championships	(Hungary) Szombathely
Win	7–0	(Bulgaria) Georgi Zlatanski	3–1	2006-07-04	2006 European Juniors Wrestling Championships	(Hungary) Szombathely
Win	6–0	(Greece) Ioannis Arzoumanidi	10–0 Tech Fall	2006-07-04	2006 European Juniors Wrestling Championships	(Hungary) Szombathely
Win	5–0	(Poland) Tomasz Ratajczyk	7–3	2006-07-04	2006 European Juniors Wrestling Championships	(Hungary) Szombathely
Win	4–0	(Russia) Ibragim Stankiev	4–1	2005-07-12	2005 European Cadets Wrestling Championships	(Albania) Tirana
Win	3–0	(Romania) Faghian Cesar	10–0 Tech Fall	2005-07-12	2005 European Cadets Wrestling Championships	(Albania) Tirana
Win	2–0	(Poland) Vladimir Karchava	7–1	2005-07-12	2005 European Cadets Wrestling Championships	(Albania) Tirana
Win	1–0	(Germany) Oliver Hassler	10–0 Tech Fall	2005-07-12	2005 European Cadets Wrestling Championships	(Albania) Tirana

== See also ==
- Taha Akgül

Olympic Games
Preceded by Neslihan Demir	Flagbearer for Turkey; Rio de Janeiro 2016	Succeeded by Merve Tuncel, Berke Saka
