= 2011 World Wrestling Championships – Men's Greco-Roman 120 kg =

Men's Greco-Roman 120 kg at the 2011 World Championships
- Venue: Sinan Erdem Dome
- Dates: 13 September 2011
- Competitors: 40 from 40 nations

Medalists
gold medal	Rıza Kayaalp	Turkey
silver medal	Mijaín López	Cuba
bronze medal	Nurmakhan Tinaliyev	Kazakhstan
bronze medal	Bashir Babajanzadeh	Iran

The men's Greco-Roman 120 kilograms is a competition featured at the 2011 World Wrestling Championships, and was held at the Sinan Erdem Dome in Istanbul, Turkey on 13 September 2011.

== Results ==
Legend

- F — Won by fall

=== Finals ===
Semifinals			Final
Nurmakhan Tinaliyev (KAZ)	3	0
Rıza Kayaalp (TUR)	5	1	Rıza Kayaalp (TUR)	2	2
Łukasz Banak (POL)	0	0	Mijaín López (CUB)	0	0
Mijaín López (CUB)	1	1

=== Top half ===
==== Section 1 ====
Round of 64

Round of 32
Murodjon Tuychiev (TJK)	1	3	1
Hani Al-Marafi (JOR)	1	0	0
Xenofon Koutsioumpas (GRE)	3	3
Rishi Pal (IND)	0	0
Nurmakhan Tinaliyev (KAZ)	0	2	2
Dremiel Byers (USA)	1	0	0
Nico Schmidt (GER)	2	1
Muminjon Abdullaev (UZB)	0	0

Round of 16
Murodjon Tuychiev (TJK)	0	0
Xenofon Koutsioumpas (GRE)	2	1
Nurmakhan Tinaliyev (KAZ)	1	1
Nico Schmidt (GER)	0	0

Quarterfinals
Xenofon Koutsioumpas (GRE)	0	1	0
Nurmakhan Tinaliyev (KAZ)	4	0	2

==== Section 2 ====
Round of 64

Round of 32
Rıza Kayaalp (TUR)	4	1
Radhouane Chebbi (TUN)	0	0
Ivan Ivanov (BUL)	2	1
Constantin Scutariu (ROU)	0	0
Rafael Barreno (VEN)	0	0
Mihály Deák-Bárdos (HUN)	2	4^{F}
Liu Deli (CHN)	0	1	1
Ihor Didyk (UKR)	1	0	3

Round of 16
Rıza Kayaalp (TUR)	1	3
Ivan Ivanov (BUL)	0	0
Mihály Deák-Bárdos (HUN)	0	1	1
Ihor Didyk (UKR)	1	0	0

Quarterfinals
Rıza Kayaalp (TUR)	4	1
Mihály Deák-Bárdos (HUN)	0	0

=== Bottom half ===
==== Section 3 ====
Round of 64

Round of 32
Kim Hyun-gyu (KOR)	0	0
Mindaugas Mizgaitis (LTU)	1	1
Ali Nadhim (IRQ)	0	0
Łukasz Banak (POL)	1	3
Yannick Szczepaniak (FRA)	2	0	0
Miloš Spasić (SRB)	0	2	1
Ramón García (DOM)	0
Anton Đok (CRO)	4^{F}

Round of 16
Mindaugas Mizgaitis (LTU)	0	1	0
Łukasz Banak (POL)	1	0	2
Miloš Spasić (SRB)	4	1
Anton Đok (CRO)	0	0

Quarterfinals
Łukasz Banak (POL)	2	1
Miloš Spasić (SRB)	0	0

==== Section 4 ====
Round of 64
Masoud Hashemzadeh (AZE)	2	1
Taisto Lalli (FIN)	0	0
Yury Patrikeyev (ARM)	2	1
Heiki Nabi (EST)	0	0
Johan Eurén (SWE)	0	0
Mijaín López (CUB)	1	2
Hirokazu Shinjo (JPN)	0	0
Murat Ramonov (KGZ)	1	2
Anatol Moldovan (MDA)	3	1
Marek Švec (CZE)	0	0
Vladimir Radosavljević (MNE)	0	0
Aleksandr Anuchin (RUS)	5	4
Bashir Babajanzadeh (IRI)	2	1
Shota Gogisvanidze (GEO)	0	0
Rocco Daniele Ficara (ITA)	0	0
Ioseb Chugoshvili (BLR)	3	2

Round of 32
Masoud Hashemzadeh (AZE)	0	1	0
Yury Patrikeyev (ARM)	1	0	1
Mijaín López (CUB)	2	4
Murat Ramonov (KGZ)	0	0
Anatol Moldovan (MDA)	0	0
Aleksandr Anuchin (RUS)	1	1
Bashir Babajanzadeh (IRI)	1	1
Ioseb Chugoshvili (BLR)	0	0

Round of 16
Yury Patrikeyev (ARM)	0	0
Mijaín López (CUB)	1	2
Aleksandr Anuchin (RUS)	0	0
Bashir Babajanzadeh (IRI)	1	1

Quarterfinals
Mijaín López (CUB)	1	1
Bashir Babajanzadeh (IRI)	0	0

=== Repechage ===
Repechage round 1
Johan Eurén (SWE)	3	3
Murat Ramonov (KGZ)	0	0

Repechage round 2
Radhouane Chebbi (TUN)	0	0
Ivan Ivanov (BUL)	1	3
Johan Eurén (SWE)	0	1	1
Yury Patrikeyev (ARM)	1	0	0

Repechage round 3
Ivan Ivanov (BUL)	0	1	0
Mihály Deák-Bárdos (HUN)	1	0	3
Johan Eurén (SWE)	0	0
Bashir Babajanzadeh (IRI)	2	2

Bronze medals
Mihály Deák-Bárdos (HUN)	0	0
Nurmakhan Tinaliyev (KAZ)	1	1
Bashir Babajanzadeh (IRI)	1	1
Łukasz Banak (POL)	0	1
