= 2010 World Wrestling Championships – Men's Greco-Roman 120 kg =

Men's Greco-Roman 120 kg at the 2010 World Championships
- Venue: Olympic Stadium
- Dates: 7 September 2010
- Competitors: 31 from 31 nations

Medalists
gold medal	Mijaín López	Cuba
silver medal	Yury Patrikeyev	Armenia
bronze medal	Nurmakhan Tinaliyev	Kazakhstan
bronze medal	Rıza Kayaalp	Turkey

The men's Greco-Roman 120 kilograms is a competition featured at the 2010 World Wrestling Championships, and was held at the Olympic Stadium in Moscow, Russia on 7 September.

This Greco-Roman wrestling competition consists of a single-elimination tournament, with a repechage used to determine the winner of two bronze medals.

== Results ==
Legend

- F — Won by fall

=== Final ===
Final
Mijaín López (CUB)	3	1
Yury Patrikeyev (ARM)	0	0

=== Top half ===
Round of 32
Khasan Baroev (RUS)	2	1
Yannick Szczepaniak (FRA)	0	0
Vladimir Guralski (ISR)	0	1	2
Mindaugas Mizgaitis (LTU)	1	0	0
Nurmakhan Tinaliyev (KAZ)	4	6
Rocco Daniele Ficara (ITA)	0	0
Murodjon Tuychiev (TJK)	0	0
Marek Švec (CZE)	1	1
Taisto Lalli (FIN)	2	0	0
Heiki Nabi (EST)	0	2	1
Nie Xiaoming (CHN)	0	0
Mijaín López (CUB)	1	7
Zaur Mehraliyev (AZE)	0	0
Łukasz Banak (POL)	1	1

Round of 16
Hani Al-Marafi (JOR)	0	0
Khasan Baroev (RUS)	6	3
Vladimir Guralski (ISR)	0	2
Nurmakhan Tinaliyev (KAZ)	1	4
Marek Švec (CZE)	0	1	1
Heiki Nabi (EST)	1	0	0
Mijaín López (CUB)	2	2
Łukasz Banak (POL)	0	0

Quarterfinals
Khasan Baroev (RUS)	0	1	1
Nurmakhan Tinaliyev (KAZ)	1	0	3
Marek Švec (CZE)	0	0
Mijaín López (CUB)	2	5

Semifinals
Nurmakhan Tinaliyev (KAZ)	0	0
Mijaín López (CUB)	1	1

=== Bottom half ===
Round of 32
Ivan Popov (AUS)	0	0
Dremiel Byers (USA)	1	1
Ioseb Chugoshvili (BLR)	2	1
Mohammad Ghorbani (IRI)	0	0
Murat Ramonov (KGZ)	2	2
Hirokazu Shinjo (JPN)	0	0
Miloš Spasić (SRB)	0	0
Guram Pherselidze (GEO)	1	1
Johan Eurén (SWE)	5	1
Ralf Böhringer (GER)	0	0
Soslan Farniev (UZB)	0	0
Oleksandr Chernetskyi (UKR)	1	1
Mihály Deák-Bárdos (HUN)	0	0
Rıza Kayaalp (TUR)	1	1
Yury Patrikeyev (ARM)	3	3
Dharmender Dalal (IND)	0	0

Round of 16
Dremiel Byers (USA)	0	1	1
Ioseb Chugoshvili (BLR)	1	0	0
Murat Ramonov (KGZ)	0	0
Guram Pherselidze (GEO)	2	1
Johan Eurén (SWE)	2	1	6
Oleksandr Chernetskyi (UKR)	3	0	0
Rıza Kayaalp (TUR)	3
Yury Patrikeyev (ARM)	3^{F}

Quarterfinals
Dremiel Byers (USA)	4	1
Guram Pherselidze (GEO)	0	0
Johan Eurén (SWE)	0	0
Yury Patrikeyev (ARM)	1	1

Semifinals
Dremiel Byers (USA)	0	0
Yury Patrikeyev (ARM)	1	3

=== Repechage ===
Repechage round 1
Nie Xiaoming (CHN)	0	0
Łukasz Banak (POL)	1	1
Dharmender Dalal (IND)	0	0
Rıza Kayaalp (TUR)	1	1

Repechage round 2
Łukasz Banak (POL)	0	1	0
Marek Švec (CZE)	3	0	1
Rıza Kayaalp (TUR)	2	1
Johan Eurén (SWE)	0	0

Bronze medals
Marek Švec (CZE)	0	0
Nurmakhan Tinaliyev (KAZ)	4	7
Rıza Kayaalp (TUR)	1	2
Dremiel Byers (USA)	0	0
