= 2014 European Wrestling Championships – Men's Greco-Roman 130 kg =

Wrestling competitions

The men's Greco-Roman 130 kg is a competition featured at the 2014 European Wrestling Championships, and was held in Vantaa, Finland on April 3.

== Medalists ==
Gold	Rıza Kayaalp; Turkey
Silver	Lyubomir Dimitrov; Bulgaria
Bronze	Johan Euren; Sweden
Bronze	Vasily Parshin; Russia

== Results ==
Legend

- C — Won by 3 cautions given to the opponent
- F — Won by fall

=== Main bracket ===
Round of 16
Bálint Lám (HUN)	1
Lyubomir Dimitrov (BUL)	10
Johan Euren (SWE)	2
Eduard Popp (GER)	0
Sabah Shariati (AZE)	4^{C}
Heiki Nabi (EST)	3
Xenofon Koutsioumpas (GRE)	1
Kiryl Hryshchanka (BLR)	4
Vachik Yeghiazaryan (ARM)	0
Vasily Parshin (RUS)	5
Oleksandr Chernetskyi (UKR)	0
Rıza Kayaalp (TUR)	2^{C}
Mindaugas Mizgaitis (LTU)	1
Guram Pherselidze (GEO)	0

Quarterfinals
Tiberiu Barbazan (ROU)	0
Lyubomir Dimitrov (BUL)	8
Johan Euren (SWE)	4^{C}
Sabah Shariati (AZE)	0
Kiryl Hryshchanka (BLR)	1
Vasily Parshin (RUS)	5
Rıza Kayaalp (TUR)	3
Mindaugas Mizgaitis (LTU)	0

Semifinals
Lyubomir Dimitrov (BUL)	1
Johan Euren (SWE)	1
Vasily Parshin (RUS)	0
Rıza Kayaalp (TUR)	9

Final
Lyubomir Dimitrov (BUL)	0
Rıza Kayaalp (TUR)	9

=== Repechage ===
Repechage round 1
Bálint Lám (HUN)	8^{F}
Tiberiu Barbazan (ROU)	0
Oleksandr Chernetskyi (UKR)	5^{F}
Mindaugas Mizgaitis (LTU)	0

Bronze medals
Bálint Lám (HUN)	1
Johan Euren (SWE)	8
Oleksandr Chernetskyi (UKR)	4
Vasily Parshin (RUS)	5
