= 2009 World Wrestling Championships – Men's Greco-Roman 120 kg =

Men's Greco-Roman 120 kg at the 2009 World Championships
- Venue: Messecenter Herning
- Dates: 27 September 2009
- Competitors: 30 from 30 nations

Medalists
gold medal	Mijaín López	Cuba
silver medal	Dremiel Byers	United States
bronze medal	Jalmar Sjöberg	Sweden
bronze medal	Rıza Kayaalp	Turkey

The men's Greco-Roman 120 kilograms is a competition featured at the 2009 World Wrestling Championships, and was held at the Messecenter Herning exhibition center in Herning, Denmark on September 27.

This Greco-Roman wrestling competition consists of a single-elimination tournament, with a repechage used to determine the winner of two bronze medals.

== Results ==
Legend

- F — Won by fall
- R — Retired

=== Final ===
Final
Dremiel Byers (USA)	0	1
Mijaín López (CUB)	2	4^{F}

=== Top half ===
Round of 32
Murodjon Tuychiev (TJK)	0	2	0
Guram Pherselidze (GEO)	2	0	4
Nico Schmidt (GER)	0	1	4
Nurmakhan Tinaliyev (KAZ)	1	0	0
Łukasz Banak (POL)	0	0
Dremiel Byers (USA)	1	2
Mihály Deák-Bárdos (HUN)	3	1
Rocco Daniele Ficara (ITA)	0	0
Mindaugas Mizgaitis (LTU)	2	2
Radomir Petković (SRB)	0	0
Vladimir Guralski (ISR)	0	1	0
Jalmar Sjöberg (SWE)	1	0	1

Round of 16
Anton Đok (CRO)	0	0
Marek Švec (CZE)	1	6
Guram Pherselidze (GEO)	0	1
Nico Schmidt (GER)	1	2
Dremiel Byers (USA)	2	1
Mihály Deák-Bárdos (HUN)	0	0
Mindaugas Mizgaitis (LTU)	0	1	0
Jalmar Sjöberg (SWE)	1	0	1

Quarterfinals
Marek Švec (CZE)	0	1	0
Nico Schmidt (GER)	1	0	2
Dremiel Byers (USA)	3	0	2
Jalmar Sjöberg (SWE)	0	2	0

Semifinals
Nico Schmidt (GER)	0	1	0
Dremiel Byers (USA)	1	0	1

=== Bottom half ===
Round of 32
Rıza Kayaalp (TUR)	1	1
Dharmender Dalal (IND)	0	0
Xu Longsheng (CHN)	0	0
Yury Patrikeyev (ARM)	1	2
Panagiotis Papadopoulos (GRE)	0	1
Ivan Ivanov (BUL)	1	5
Oleksandr Chernetskyi (UKR)	0	0
Aleksandr Anuchin (RUS)	1	3
Rafael Barreno (VEN)	2	1
Rodrigo Artilheiro (BRA)	0	0
Mijaín López (CUB)	1	6
Ali Nadhim (IRQ)	0	0
Hirokazu Shinjo (JPN)	0	0
Murat Ramonov (KGZ)	1	2
Ioseb Chugoshvili (BLR)	0	1	1
Masoud Hashemzadeh (IRI)	1	0	0

Round of 16
Rıza Kayaalp (TUR)	3	1
Yury Patrikeyev (ARM)	1	0
Ivan Ivanov (BUL)	0	0
Aleksandr Anuchin (RUS)	1	6
Rafael Barreno (VEN)	0	0
Mijaín López (CUB)	6	6
Murat Ramonov (KGZ)	1	0
Ioseb Chugoshvili (BLR)	2	2

Quarterfinals
Rıza Kayaalp (TUR)	2
Aleksandr Anuchin (RUS)	0^{R}
Mijaín López (CUB)	1	3
Ioseb Chugoshvili (BLR)	0	0

Semifinals
Rıza Kayaalp (TUR)	0	0
Mijaín López (CUB)	1	1

=== Repechage ===
Repechage round 1
Łukasz Banak (POL)	0	0
Mihály Deák-Bárdos (HUN)	1	2
Ali Nadhim (IRQ)	0	1	0
Rafael Barreno (VEN)	1	0	2

Repechage round 2
Mihály Deák-Bárdos (HUN)	0	0
Jalmar Sjöberg (SWE)	1	1
Rafael Barreno (VEN)	0	0
Ioseb Chugoshvili (BLR)	1	3

Bronze medals
Jalmar Sjöberg (SWE)	2	1
Nico Schmidt (GER)	0	0
Ioseb Chugoshvili (BLR)	0	0
Rıza Kayaalp (TUR)	1	1
