= Wrestling at the 2016 Summer Olympics – Men's Greco-Roman 130 kg =

Men's Greco-Roman 130 kg at the Games of the XXXI Olympiad
- Venue: Carioca Arena 2
- Date: 15 August 2016
- Competitors: 19 from 19 nations

Medalists
1st place, gold medalist(s)		Mijaín López	Cuba
2nd place, silver medalist(s)		Rıza Kayaalp	Turkey
3rd place, bronze medalist(s)		Sabah Shariati	Azerbaijan
3rd place, bronze medalist(s)		Sergey Semenov	Russia

Men's Greco-Roman 130 kilograms competition at the 2016 Summer Olympics in Rio de Janeiro, Brazil took place on August 15 at the Carioca Arena 2 in Barra da Tijuca.

This Greco-Roman wrestling competition consists of a single-elimination tournament, with a repechage used to determine the winner of two bronze medals. The two finalists face off for gold and silver medals. Each wrestler who loses to one of the two finalists moves into the repechage, culminating in a pair of bronze medal matches featuring the semifinal losers each facing the remaining repechage opponent from their half of the bracket.

The medals for the competition were presented by Sergey Bubka, IOC member, Ukraine, and the gifts were presented by Ahmet Ayik, Vice President of UWW.

== Schedule ==
All times are Brasília Standard Time (UTC−03:00)

Date	Time	Event
15 August 2016	10:00	Qualification rounds
15 August 2016	16:00	Repechage
15 August 2016	17:00	Finals

== Results ==
Legend

- F — Won by fall

=== Final ===
Final
Rıza Kayaalp (TUR)	0
Mijaín López (CUB)	6

=== Top half ===
Qualifications

1/8 finals
Rıza Kayaalp (TUR)	8
Erwin Caraballo (VEN)	0
Sabah Shariati (AZE)	8
Robby Smith (USA)	2
Meng Qiang (CHN)	1
Bashir Babajanzadeh (IRI)	3
Eduard Popp (GER)	1
Nurmakhan Tinaliyev (KAZ)	0

1/4 finals
Rıza Kayaalp (TUR)	5^{F}
Sabah Shariati (AZE)	0
Bashir Babajanzadeh (IRI)	1
Eduard Popp (GER)	3

Semifinals
Rıza Kayaalp (TUR)	8
Eduard Popp (GER)	0

=== Bottom half ===
Qualifications
Murat Ramonov (KGZ)	4
Sergey Semenov (RUS)	8
Abdellatif Mohamed (EGY)	0
Oleksandr Chernetskyi (UKR)	9
Eduard Soghomonyan (BRA)	0
Iakobi Kajaia (GEO)	8

1/8 finals
Mijaín López (CUB)	3
Heiki Nabi (EST)	0
Johan Eurén (SWE)	9^{F}
Ivan Popov (AUS)	0
Muminjon Abdullaev (UZB)	0
Sergey Semenov (RUS)	3
Oleksandr Chernetskyi (UKR)	1
Iakobi Kajaia (GEO)	2^{F}

1/4 finals
Mijaín López (CUB)	4
Johan Eurén (SWE)	0
Sergey Semenov (RUS)	5
Iakobi Kajaia (GEO)	0

Semifinals
Mijaín López (CUB)	3
Sergey Semenov (RUS)	0

=== Repechage ===
Repechage round 2
Erwin Caraballo (VEN)	0
Sabah Shariati (AZE)	8
Heiki Nabi (EST)	3
Johan Eurén (SWE)	0

Bronze medals
Sabah Shariati (AZE)	3^{F}
Eduard Popp (GER)	0
Heiki Nabi (EST)	0
Sergey Semenov (RUS)	6

== Final standing ==
Rank	Athlete
1st place, gold medalist(s)	Mijaín López (CUB)
2nd place, silver medalist(s)	Rıza Kayaalp (TUR)
3rd place, bronze medalist(s)	Sabah Shariati (AZE)
3rd place, bronze medalist(s)	Sergey Semenov (RUS)
5	Eduard Popp (GER)
5	Heiki Nabi (EST)
7	Iakobi Kajaia (GEO)
8	Johan Eurén (SWE)
9	Oleksandr Chernetskyi (UKR)
10	Bashir Babajanzadeh (IRI)
11	Murat Ramonov (KGZ)
12	Robby Smith (USA)
13	Meng Qiang (CHN)
14	Nurmakhan Tinaliyev (KAZ)
15	Muminjon Abdullaev (UZB)
16	Eduard Soghomonyan (BRA)
17	Abdellatif Mohamed (EGY)
17	Ivan Popov (AUS)
19	Erwin Caraballo (VEN)
