= 2011 Vehbi Emre Tournament =

- Host city: Turkey, Istanbul
- Dates: 29–30 January 2011
- Stadium: Ahmet Comert Sports Complex

The 29th Vehbi Emre Tournament 2011 was a wrestling event held in Istanbul, Turkey between 29 and 30 January 2011.

This international tournament includes competition men's Greco-Roman wrestling. This ranking tournament was held in honor of Turkish Wrestler and manager Vehbi Emre.

== Medal table ==
Rank	Nation	Gold	Silver	Bronze	Total
1	Turkey	4	1	4	9
2	Azerbaijan	2	1	3	6
3	Hungary	1	0	2	3
4	Iran	0	3	1	4
5	Belarus	0	1	1	2
6	Croatia	0	1	0	1
7	Estonia	0	0	1	1
7	Kazakhstan	0	0	1	1
7	Ukraine	0	0	1	1
Totals (9 entries)		7	7	14	28

== Greco-Roman ==
Event	Gold	Silver	Bronze
55 kg	(Turkey) Ayhan Karakuş	(Azerbaijan) Eldaniz Azizli	(Turkey) Bayram Özdemir
55 kg	(Turkey) Ayhan Karakuş	(Azerbaijan) Eldaniz Azizli	(Azerbaijan) Ali Elçin
60 kg	(Turkey) Mustafa Sağlam	(Iran) Abdolmohammad Papi	(Turkey) Hüseyin Aygün
60 kg	(Turkey) Mustafa Sağlam	(Iran) Abdolmohammad Papi	(Turkey) Abdullah Soytürk
66 kg	(Hungary) Tamás Lőrincz	(Turkey) Refik Ayvazoğlu	(Azerbaijan) Rustam Aliev
66 kg	(Hungary) Tamás Lőrincz	(Turkey) Refik Ayvazoğlu	(Belarus) Kazbek Kilov
74 kg	(Azerbaijan) Rafik Huseynov	(Belarus) Aliaksandr Kikiniou	(Hungary) Péter Bácsi
74 kg	(Azerbaijan) Rafik Huseynov	(Belarus) Aliaksandr Kikiniou	(Kazakhstan) Maksat Yerezhepov
84 kg	(Azerbaijan) Saman Tahmasebi	(Croatia) Nenad Žugaj	(Ukraine) Vassili Radyiba
84 kg	(Azerbaijan) Saman Tahmasebi	(Croatia) Nenad Žugaj	(Iran) Davoud Abedinzadeh
96 kg	(Turkey) Ahmet Taçyıldız	(Iran) Mehdi Askarizadeh	(Azerbaijan) Shalva Gadabadze
96 kg	(Turkey) Ahmet Taçyıldız	(Iran) Mehdi Askarizadeh	(Hungary) Németh Iván
120 kg	(Turkey) Rıza Kayaalp	(Iran) Bashir Babajanzadeh	(Estonia) Heiki Nabi
120 kg	(Turkey) Rıza Kayaalp	(Iran) Bashir Babajanzadeh	(Turkey) Atilla Güzel

== Participating nations ==
- Turkey
- Azerbaijan
- Iran
- Bulgaria
- Georgia
- Croatia
- Estonia
- Ukraine
- Greece
- Hungary
- Romania
- Belarus
- Algeria
- Kazakhstan
- Tajikistan
