= 2016 European Wrestling Championships – Men's Greco-Roman 130 kg =

Wrestling competition

The men's Greco-Roman 130 kg is a competition featured at the 2016 European Wrestling Championships, and was held in Riga, Latvia on March 12.

== Medalists ==
Gold	Rıza Kayaalp; Turkey
Silver	Oleksandr Chernetskyi; Ukraine
Bronze	Johan Euren; Sweden
Bronze	Ioseb Chugoshvili; Belarus

== Results ==
Legend

- F — Won by fall

=== Final ===
Final
Rıza Kayaalp (TUR)	2^{F}
Oleksandr Chernetskyi (UKR)	2

=== Top half ===
==== Section 1 ====
Round of 32

Round of 16
Stjepan Lavric (CRO)	0
Iakobi Kajaia (GEO)	5
Johan Euren (SWE)	8
Igors Kostins (LAT)	0
Vitaly Shchur (RUS)	6^{F}
Tamas Soos (SVK)	0
Rıza Kayaalp (TUR)	14
Lyubomir Dimitrov (BUL)	0

Quarterfinals
Iakobi Kajaia (GEO)	1
Johan Euren (SWE)	1
Vitaly Shchur (RUS)	1
Rıza Kayaalp (TUR)	3

Semifinals
Johan Euren (SWE)	2
Rıza Kayaalp (TUR)	4

=== Bottom half ===
Round of 32
Oleksandr Chernetskyi (UKR)	4^{F}
Sabah Shariati (AZE)	0
Lukas Hoermann (AUT)	0
Edgar Khachatryan (ARM)	9
Eduard Popp (GER)	6
Nemanja Pavlovich (SRB)	2

Round of 16
Ioseb Chugoshvili (BLR)	2
Mindaugas Mizgaitis (LTU)	0
Heiki Nabi (EST)	3
Armin Mozes Majoros (HUN)	2
Lukasz Banak (POL)	0
Oleksandr Chernetskyi (UKR)	4^{F}
Edgar Khachatryan (ARM)	0
Eduard Popp (GER)	6^{F}

Quarterfinals
Ioseb Chugoshvili (BLR)	3
Heiki Nabi (EST)	1
Oleksandr Chernetskyi (UKR)	8
Eduard Popp (GER)	0

Semifinals
Ioseb Chugoshvili (BLR)	0
Oleksandr Chernetskyi (UKR)	6^{F}

=== Repechage ===
Repechage round 1
Sabah Shariati (AZE)	9
Lukasz Banak (POL)	0

Repechage round 2
Lyubomir Dimitrov (BUL)	0
Vitaly Shchur (RUS)	4^{F}
Sabah Shariati (AZE)	1
Eduard Popp (GER)	3

Bronze medals
Vitaly Shchur (RUS)	1
Johan Euren (SWE)	2
Eduard Popp (GER)	1
Ioseb Chugoshvili (BLR)	4
