= 2008 Vehbi Emre Tournament =

- Host city: Turkey, Istanbul
- Dates: 26–27 January 2008
- Stadium: Bağcılar Olympic Sport Hall

The 26th Vehbi Emre Tournament 2008, was a wrestling event held in Istanbul, Turkey between 26 and 27 January 2008.

This international tournament includes competition men's Greco-Roman wrestling. This ranking tournament was held honor of Turkish Wrestler and manager Vehbi Emre.

== Medal table ==
Rank	Nation	Gold	Silver	Bronze	Total
1	Turkey	6	1	5	12
2	Ukraine	1	0	0	1
3	Belarus	0	2	3	5
4	Azerbaijan	0	2	1	3
5	Uzbekistan	0	1	2	3
6	United States	0	1	0	1
7	Greece	0	0	2	2
8	Kazakhstan	0	0	1	1
Totals (8 entries)		7	7	14	28

=== Men's Greco-Roman ===
Event	Gold	Silver	Bronze
55 kg	Hüseyin Aygün; Turkey	Lindsey Durlacher; United States	Ildar Hafizov; Uzbekistan
55 kg	Hüseyin Aygün; Turkey	Lindsey Durlacher; United States	Marat Garipov; Kazakhstan
60 kg	Dauylo Krymov; Ukraine	Vitali Rahimov; Azerbaijan	Dilshod Aripov; Uzbekistan
60 kg	Dauylo Krymov; Ukraine	Vitali Rahimov; Azerbaijan	Atakan Yüksel; Turkey
66 kg	Refik Ayvazoğlu; Turkey	Şeref Eroğlu; Turkey	Erkan Ulvan; Turkey
66 kg	Refik Ayvazoğlu; Turkey	Şeref Eroğlu; Turkey	Mikkiail Siamonad; Belarus
74 kg	Şeref Tüfenk; Turkey	Kiknas Aliaksandr; Belarus	Ilgar Abdulov; Azerbaijan
74 kg	Şeref Tüfenk; Turkey	Kiknas Aliaksandr; Belarus	Viktor Aniskovets; Belarus
84 kg	Nazmi Avluca; Turkey	Shalva Gadabadze; Azerbaijan	Muhammet Yücedağ; Turkey
84 kg	Nazmi Avluca; Turkey	Shalva Gadabadze; Azerbaijan	Andrei Baranouski; Belarus
96 kg	Ahmet Taçyıldız; Turkey	Shota Narmaniya; Belarus	Tagodoros Tounosidis; Greece
96 kg	Ahmet Taçyıldız; Turkey	Shota Narmaniya; Belarus	Mehmet Özal; Turkey
120 kg	Atilla Güzel; Turkey	David Soldatze; Uzbekistan	Rıza Kayaalp; Turkey
120 kg	Atilla Güzel; Turkey	David Soldatze; Uzbekistan	Panagiozis Papadopoulos; Greece

== Participating nations ==
- Turkey
- Azerbaijan
- Egypt
- United States
- Tunisia
- Romania
- Ukraine
- Jordan
- Uzbekistan
- Kazakhstan
- Syria
- Tajikistan
