= 2013 Vehbi Emre Tournament =

- Host city: Turkey, Istanbul
- Dates: 2–3 February 2013
- Stadium: Ahmet Comert Sports Complex

The 31st Vehbi Emre Tournament 2013, was a wrestling event held in Istanbul, Turkey between 2 and 3 February 2013.

This international tournament includes competition men's Greco-Roman wrestling. This ranking tournament was held in honor of Turkish Wrestler and manager Vehbi Emre.

== Medal table ==
Rank	Nation	Gold	Silver	Bronze	Total
1	Turkey	4	0	3	7
2	Russia	2	2	1	5
3	Azerbaijan	1	0	2	3
4	Belarus	0	3	1	4
5	Iran	0	1	4	5
6	Georgia	0	1	1	2
7	Kazakhstan	0	0	2	2
Totals (7 entries)		7	7	14	28

== Greco-Roman ==
Event	Gold	Silver	Bronze
55 kg	(Russia) Ivan Tatarinov	(Belarus) Elbek Tazhyiev	(Kazakhstan) Zhanserik Sarsenbaev
55 kg	(Russia) Ivan Tatarinov	(Belarus) Elbek Tazhyiev	(Iran) Shirzad Beheshti
60 kg	(Russia) Pavel Saleev	(Russia) Sanal Semenov	(Kazakhstan) Daulet Absalimov
60 kg	(Russia) Pavel Saleev	(Russia) Sanal Semenov	(Turkey) Mevlüt Ank
66 kg	(Azerbaijan) Rasul Chunayev	(Iran) Mohammad Karimi	(Azerbaijan) Vitaliy Rahimov
66 kg	(Azerbaijan) Rasul Chunayev	(Iran) Mohammad Karimi	(Belarus) Yaroslav Kardash
74 kg	(Turkey) Şeref Tüfenk	(Belarus) Kazbek Kilov	(Russia) Anton Khomenko
74 kg	(Turkey) Şeref Tüfenk	(Belarus) Kazbek Kilov	(Azerbaijan) Niyamaddin Ibragimov
84 kg	(Turkey) Selçuk Çebi	(Georgia (country)) Revaz Nadareishvili	(Iran) Ali Gheitasi
84 kg	(Turkey) Selçuk Çebi	(Georgia (country)) Revaz Nadareishvili	(Iran) Hossein Nouri
96 kg	(Turkey) Cenk İldem	(Russia) Rustam Totrov	(Turkey) Ahmet Taçyıldız
96 kg	(Turkey) Cenk İldem	(Russia) Rustam Totrov	(Georgia (country)) Mikheil Kajaia
120 kg	(Turkey) Rıza Kayaalp	(Belarus) Ioseb Chugoshvili	(Iran) Mehdi Nouri
120 kg	(Turkey) Rıza Kayaalp	(Belarus) Ioseb Chugoshvili	(Turkey) Emin Öztürk

== Participating nations ==
- Turkey
- Azerbaijan
- Belarus
- Russia
- Iran
- Uzbekistan
- Greece
- Georgia
- Serbia
- Kazakhstan
- Tunisia
- Austria
