= 2008 World Junior Wrestling Championships =

Junior Wrestling Championships

- Host city: Istanbul, Turkey
- Dates: 28 July - 3 August 2008

Champions
- Freestyle: Russia
- Greco-Roman: Turkey
- Women: Russia

The 2008 World Junior Wrestling Championships were the 32nd edition of the World Junior Wrestling Championships and were held in Istanbul, Turkey between 28 July–3 August 2008.

== Medal table ==
Rank	Nation	Gold	Silver	Bronze	Total
1	Russia	9	4	2	15
2	Turkey	6	1	4	11
3	Iran	2	5	2	9
4	Japan	2	0	5	7
5	Kazakhstan	1	2	1	4
6	Azerbaijan	1	1	3	5
7	Kyrgyzstan	1	1	0	2
8	United States	1	0	6	7
9	Bulgaria	1	0	1	2
10	Cuba	0	2	1	3
11	Ukraine	0	1	4	5
12	Georgia	0	1	3	4
12	Mongolia	0	1	3	4
12	Sweden	0	1	3	4
15	Belarus	0	1	1	2
16	Lithuania	0	1	0	1
16	Poland	0	1	0	1
16	Serbia	0	1	0	1
19	India	0	0	2	2
19	Romania	0	0	2	2
19	Uzbekistan	0	0	2	2
22	Germany	0	0	1	1
22	Moldova	0	0	1	1
22	South Korea	0	0	1	1
Totals (24 entries)		24	24	48	96

== Medal summary ==
=== Men's freestyle ===
Event	Gold	Silver	Bronze
50 kg	Ahmet Peker; Turkey	Mikhail Ivanov; Russia	Nitin Nitin; India
50 kg	Ahmet Peker; Turkey	Mikhail Ivanov; Russia	Vladimer Khinchegashvili; Georgia
55 kg	Nariman Israpilov; Russia	Hassan Rahimi; Iran	Damdinbazar Tsogtbaatar; Mongolia
55 kg	Nariman Israpilov; Russia	Hassan Rahimi; Iran	Stoyan Tsonev; Bulgaria
60 kg	Masoud Esmaeilpour; Iran	Alejandro Valdes; Cuba	Semak Lyubomir; Ukraine
60 kg	Masoud Esmaeilpour; Iran	Alejandro Valdes; Cuba	Muhammet Demir; Turkey
66 kg	Magomedmurad Gadzhiev; Russia	Jabrayil Hasanov; Azerbaijan	Unurbat Purevjav; Mongolia
66 kg	Magomedmurad Gadzhiev; Russia	Jabrayil Hasanov; Azerbaijan	Ikhtiyor Navruzov; Uzbekistan
74 kg	Magomed Zubairov; Russia	Saeid Tavakoli; Iran	Georgi Marsagishvili; Georgia
74 kg	Magomed Zubairov; Russia	Saeid Tavakoli; Iran	Quentin Wright; United States
84 kg	Abdusalam Gadisov; Russia	Beka Chelidze; Georgia	Mike Letts; United States
84 kg	Abdusalam Gadisov; Russia	Beka Chelidze; Georgia	Umidjon Ismanov; Uzbekistan
96 kg	Alen Zasieiev; Russia	Shamil Dibirov; Ukraine	Komeil Ghasemi; Iran
96 kg	Alen Zasieiev; Russia	Shamil Dibirov; Ukraine	Clayton Foster; United States
120 kg	Soslan Gagloev; Russia	Elier Camacho; Cuba	Levan Berianidze; Georgia
120 kg	Soslan Gagloev; Russia	Elier Camacho; Cuba	Nobuyoshi Arakida; Japan

=== Greco-Roman ===
Event	Gold	Silver	Bronze
50 kg	Kanybek Zholchubekov; Kyrgyzstan	Reza Asadpour; Iran	Sang-Hoon Oh; South Korea
50 kg	Kanybek Zholchubekov; Kyrgyzstan	Reza Asadpour; Iran	Ferhat Tekin; Turkey
55 kg	Aleksandar Kostadinov; Bulgaria	Arsen Eraliev; Kyrgyzstan	Maikel Anache; Cuba
55 kg	Aleksandar Kostadinov; Bulgaria	Arsen Eraliev; Kyrgyzstan	Harun Bozoğlu; Turkey
60 kg	Rahman Bilici; Turkey	Henadzi Aliashchuk; Belarus	Eldar Kairatov; Kazakhstan
60 kg	Rahman Bilici; Turkey	Henadzi Aliashchuk; Belarus	Hajikhan Mustafayev; Azerbaijan
66 kg	Saeid Abdevali; Iran	Aleksandar Maksimović; Serbia	Rafig Huseynov; Azerbaijan
66 kg	Saeid Abdevali; Iran	Aleksandar Maksimović; Serbia	Migran Arutyunyan; Russia
74 kg	Elvin Mursaliyev; Azerbaijan	Alkhazur Ozdiev; Kazakhstan	Jafari Mohammadabadi; Iran
74 kg	Elvin Mursaliyev; Azerbaijan	Alkhazur Ozdiev; Kazakhstan	Selim Demir; Turkey
84 kg	Zaur Karezhev; Russia	Aldas Lukosaitis; Lithuania	Aleksander Shyshman; Ukraine
84 kg	Zaur Karezhev; Russia	Aldas Lukosaitis; Lithuania	Robert Papp; Romania
96 kg	Ahmet Taçyıldız; Turkey	Mohammad Reza Akbari; Iran	Oliver Hassler; Germany
96 kg	Ahmet Taçyıldız; Turkey	Mohammad Reza Akbari; Iran	Marin Cazac; Moldova
120 kg	Rıza Kayaalp; Turkey	Bashir Babajanzadeh; Iran	Cesar Faghian; Romania
120 kg	Rıza Kayaalp; Turkey	Bashir Babajanzadeh; Iran	Shinichi Hirakawa; Japan

=== Women's freestyle ===
Event	Gold	Silver	Bronze
44 kg	Eleonora Abutalipova; Kazakhstan	Sümeyye Sezer; Turkey	Priyanka Singh; India
44 kg	Eleonora Abutalipova; Kazakhstan	Sümeyye Sezer; Turkey	Hanna Wennstroem; Sweden
48 kg	Fuyuko Mimura; Japan	Zhuldyz Eshimova-Turtbayeva; Kazakhstan	Maria Livach; Ukraine
48 kg	Fuyuko Mimura; Japan	Zhuldyz Eshimova-Turtbayeva; Kazakhstan	Alyssa Lampe; United States
51 kg	Yu Horiuchi; Japan	Ekaterina Krasnova; Russia	Helen Maroulis; United States
51 kg	Yu Horiuchi; Japan	Ekaterina Krasnova; Russia	Nadiya Gradyuk; Azerbaijan
55 kg	Emriye Musta; Turkey	Irina Kisel; Russia	Akiko Shimizu; Japan
55 kg	Emriye Musta; Turkey	Irina Kisel; Russia	Tsevegmed Enkhbayar; Mongolia
59 kg	Anastasia Bratchikova; Russia	Johanna Mattsson; Sweden	Alla Cherkasova; Ukraine
59 kg	Anastasia Bratchikova; Russia	Johanna Mattsson; Sweden	Tatiana Padilla; United States
63 kg	Ekaterina Melnikova; Russia	Paulina Grabowska; Poland	Henna Johansson; Sweden
63 kg	Ekaterina Melnikova; Russia	Paulina Grabowska; Poland	Ayaka Sato; Japan
67 kg	Adeline Gray; United States	Ochirbatyn Nasanburmaa; Mongolia	Natalya Laushkina; Russia
67 kg	Adeline Gray; United States	Ochirbatyn Nasanburmaa; Mongolia	Chiaki Iijima; Japan
72 kg	Simge Yılmaz; Turkey	Ekaterina Efimova; Russia	Natalya Shynkarova; Belarus
72 kg	Simge Yılmaz; Turkey	Ekaterina Efimova; Russia	Emma Weberg; Sweden
