= 2014 Vehbi Emre Tournament =

2014 Vehbi Emre & Hamit Kaplan Tournament
- Host city: Turkey, Istanbul
- Dates: February 1–2, 2014
- Stadium: Ahmet Comert Sports Complex

The 32nd Vehbi Emre & Hamit Kaplan Tournament 2014, was a wrestling event held in Istanbul, Turkey between February 1 and 2, 2014.

This international tournament includes competition men's Greco-Roman wrestling. This ranking tournament was held in honor of the Olympic Champion, Hamit Kaplan and Turkish Wrestler and manager Vehbi Emre.

== Medal table ==
Rank	Nation	Gold	Silver	Bronze	Total
1	Turkey	4	1	7	12
2	Belarus	2	1	0	3
3	Azerbaijan	1	1	3	5
4	Russia	1	0	2	3
5	Georgia	0	2	2	4
6	Kazakhstan	0	1	0	1
6	Romania	0	1	0	1
6	Uzbekistan	0	1	0	1
9	Bulgaria	0	0	1	1
9	Ukraine	0	0	1	1
Totals (10 entries)		8	8	16	32

== Greco-Roman ==
Event	Gold	Silver	Bronze
59 kg	(Russia) Mingiyan Semenov	(Belarus) Soslan Daurov	(Turkey) Rahman Bilici
59 kg	(Russia) Mingiyan Semenov	(Belarus) Soslan Daurov	(Ukraine) Dmytro Tsymbaliuk
66 kg	(Turkey) Atakan Yüksel	(Uzbekistan) Elmurad Tasmahmudov	(Georgia (country)) Anton Mamageishvili
66 kg	(Turkey) Atakan Yüksel	(Uzbekistan) Elmurad Tasmahmudov	(Russia) Zaur Kabaloev
71 kg	(Azerbaijan) Rasul Chunayev	(Georgia (country)) Mindia Tsulukidze	(Azerbaijan) Rustam Aliyev
71 kg	(Azerbaijan) Rasul Chunayev	(Georgia (country)) Mindia Tsulukidze	(Turkey) Yunus Özel
75 kg	(Turkey) Emrah Kuş	(Kazakhstan) Rashid Kochiev	(Turkey) Osman Köse
75 kg	(Turkey) Emrah Kuş	(Kazakhstan) Rashid Kochiev	(Azerbaijan) Elvin Mursaliyev
80 kg	(Belarus) Viktar Sasunouski	(Georgia (country)) Dzamashvili Tornike	(Turkey) Selçuk Çebi
80 kg	(Belarus) Viktar Sasunouski	(Georgia (country)) Dzamashvili Tornike	(Russia) Bekkhan Ozdoev
85 kg	(Belarus) Javid Hamzatau	(Azerbaijan) Shahriyar Mammadov	(Turkey) Metehan Başar
85 kg	(Belarus) Javid Hamzatau	(Azerbaijan) Shahriyar Mammadov	(Turkey) Ahmet Yıldırım
98 kg	(Turkey) Cenk İldem	(Romania) Alin Alexuc-Ciurariu	(Azerbaijan) Saman Tahmasebi
98 kg	(Turkey) Cenk İldem	(Romania) Alin Alexuc-Ciurariu	(Georgia (country)) Soso Jabidze
130 kg	(Turkey) Rıza Kayaalp	(Turkey) Atilla Güzel	(Bulgaria) Kiryl Hryhchanka
130 kg	(Turkey) Rıza Kayaalp	(Turkey) Atilla Güzel	(Turkey) Emin Öztürk

== Participating nations ==
- Azerbaijan
- Belarus
- Bulgaria
- Georgia
- Iran
- Kazakhstan
- Kyrgyzstan
- Lebanon
- Lithuania
- Moldova
- Romania
- Russia
- Turkey
- Ukraine
- Uzbekistan
