= 2026 European Wrestling Championships – Men's Greco-Roman 130 kg =

Men's Greco-Roman 130 kg at the 2026 European Wrestling Championships
- Venue: Tirana Olympic Park
- Location: Tirana, Albania
- Dates: 19–20 April
- Competitors: 16 from 14 nations

Medalists
gold medal	Rıza Kayaalp	Turkey
silver medal	Dáriusz Vitek	Hungary
bronze medal	Mykhailo Vyshnyvetskyi	Ukraine
bronze medal	Pavel Hlinchuk

The men's Greco-Roman 130 kilograms competition at the 2026 European Wrestling Championships was held from 19 to 20 April 2026 at the Tirana Olympic Park in Tirana, Albania. Rıza Kayaalp won the gold medal after defeating Hungarian wrestler Dáriusz Vitek 7–1 in the final. With this victory, Kayaalp won his 13th European title, surpassing Aleksandr Karelin's record of 12 European gold medals. Pavel Hlinchuk, who was disqualified in the semifinal, was later allowed to compete in the bronze medal match following an appeal board decision.

== Results ==
Legend

- DSQ — Disqualified
- F — Won by fall

=== Main bracket ===
Round of 16
Dáriusz Vitek (HUN)	1
Sulkhan Buidze (GEO)	1
Apostolos Tsiovolos (GRE)	0
Mykhailo Vyshnyvetskyi (UKR)	4^{F}
Beka Kandelaki (AZE)	11
Griseldi Kodra (ALB)	0
Romas Fridrikas (LTU)	1
Jello Krahmer (GER)	1
Pavel Hlinchuk (UWW)	7
Jacob Logård (SWE)	1
Danila Sotnikov (ITA)	1
Heiki Nabi (EST)	1
Albert Vardanyan (ARM)	0
Rıza Kayaalp (TUR)	4^{F}
Marat Kamparov (UWW)	1
Elias Kuosmanen (FIN)	1

Quarterfinals
Dáriusz Vitek (HUN)	3
Mykhailo Vyshnyvetskyi (UKR)	2
Beka Kandelaki (AZE)	3
Jello Krahmer (GER)	2
Pavel Hlinchuk (UWW)	8
Danila Sotnikov (ITA)	0
Rıza Kayaalp (TUR)	1
Marat Kamparov (UWW)	1

Semifinals
Dáriusz Vitek (HUN)	1
Beka Kandelaki (AZE)	1
~~Pavel Hlinchuk (UWW)~~	0^{DSQ}
Rıza Kayaalp (TUR)	4

Final
Dáriusz Vitek (HUN)	1
Rıza Kayaalp (TUR)	7

=== Repechage ===
Repechage round 1
Sulkhan Buidze (GEO)	1
Mykhailo Vyshnyvetskyi (UKR)	1
Albert Vardanyan (ARM)	1
Marat Kamparov (UWW)	9

Bronze medal matches
Mykhailo Vyshnyvetskyi (UKR)	3
Beka Kandelaki (AZE)	1
Marat Kamparov (UWW)	5
Pavel Hlinchuk (UWW)	10

== Final standing ==
Rank	Wrestler
1st place, gold medalist(s)	Rıza Kayaalp (TUR)
2nd place, silver medalist(s)	Dáriusz Vitek (HUN)
3rd place, bronze medalist(s)	Mykhailo Vyshnyvetskyi (UKR)
3rd place, bronze medalist(s)	Pavel Hlinchuk (UWW)
5	Beka Kandelaki (AZE)
5	Marat Kamparov (UWW)
6	Jello Krahmer (GER)
7	Danila Sotnikov (ITA)
8	Sulkhan Buidze (GEO)
9	Elias Kuosmanen (FIN)
10	Romas Fridrikas (LTU)
11	Heiki Nabi (EST)
12	Jacob Logård (SWE)
13	Albert Vardanyan (ARM)
14	Apostolos Tsiovolos (GRE)
15	Griseldi Kodra (ALB)
