= Aksaray University =

Public university in Aksaray, Turkey

Coordinates: 38.3260°N 33.9761°E

- Motto: Thinking local, acting global.
- Type: Public
- Established: 2006
- Rector: Prof. Dr. Yusuf Şahin
- Academic staff: 760 (2016)
- Students: 20,400 (2016)
- Location: Aksaray, Turkey
- Website: aksaray.edu.tr

Aksaray University (Turkish: Aksaray Üniversitesi) is a public higher educational institution established on March 17, 2006, in Aksaray, Central Anatolia in Turkey. Formerly it was a subunit of the Niğde University.

The university has seven faculties, two institutes, two colleges and five vocational colleges. Its campus is located on the highway to Adana.

The university is a member of the Caucasus University Association.

== Academic units ==
Faculties

- Science and Letters
- Engineering
- Education
- Economics and Business Administration
- Veterinary
- Tourism

Institutes

- Sciences
- Social Sciences

Colleges

- Health Sciences
- Health Services

Vocational colleges (VC)

- Aksaray Technical Sciences VC
- Aksaray Social Sciences VC
- Ş.Koçhisar VC
- Ortaköy VC
- Health Services VC

== Notable alumni ==
- Rıza Kayaalp, World and European champion Turkish wrestler
