= 2010 Vehbi Emre Tournament =

Wrestling event in Istanbul, Turkey

- Host city: Turkey, Istanbul
- Dates: 29–30 January 2010
- Stadium: Ahmet Comert Sports Complex

The 28th Vehbi Emre Tournament 2010, was a wrestling event held in Istanbul, Turkey between 29 and 30 January 2010.

This international tournament includes competition men's Greco-Roman wrestling. This ranking tournament was held in honor of Turkish Wrestler and manager Vehbi Emre.

== Medal table ==
Rank	Nation	Gold	Silver	Bronze	Total
1	Azerbaijan	3	2	1	6
2	Turkey	2	4	8	14
3	Russia	2	0	0	2
4	Ukraine	0	1	1	2
5	Belarus	0	0	1	1
5	Bulgaria	0	0	1	1
5	Iran	0	0	1	1
5	Sweden	0	0	1	1
Totals (8 entries)		7	7	14	28

== Greco-Roman ==
Event	Gold	Silver	Bronze
55 kg	(Azerbaijan) Ali Elçin	(Ukraine) Vugar Rakhimov	(Turkey) Kürşat Kiraz
55 kg	(Azerbaijan) Ali Elçin	(Ukraine) Vugar Rakhimov	(Azerbaijan) Qadir Suleymanov
60 kg	(Azerbaijan) Hasan Aliyev	(Azerbaijan) Vitali Rahimov	(Turkey) Soner Sucu
60 kg	(Azerbaijan) Hasan Aliyev	(Azerbaijan) Vitali Rahimov	(Bulgaria) Ivo Angelov
66 kg	(Russia) Ambako Vachadze	(Turkey) Refik Ayvazoğlu	(Turkey) Abdülsamet Günal
66 kg	(Russia) Ambako Vachadze	(Turkey) Refik Ayvazoğlu	(Belarus) Evgeni Slivonchik
74 kg	(Turkey) Şeref Tüfenk	(Azerbaijan) Rafik Huseynov	(Turkey) Emrah Kuş
74 kg	(Turkey) Şeref Tüfenk	(Azerbaijan) Rafik Huseynov	(Turkey) Mehmet Ali Küçükosman
84 kg	(Azerbaijan) Shalva Gadabadze	(Turkey) Aslan Atem	(Turkey) Ahmet Yıldırım
84 kg	(Azerbaijan) Shalva Gadabadze	(Turkey) Aslan Atem	(Sweden) Jim Pettersson
96 kg	(Russia) Aslanbek Khushtov	(Turkey) Cenk İldem	(Ukraine) Oleg Kryoka
96 kg	(Russia) Aslanbek Khushtov	(Turkey) Cenk İldem	(Turkey) Ahmet Taçyıldız
120 kg	(Turkey) Rıza Kayaalp	(Turkey) İsmail Güzel	(Turkey) Yekta Yılmaz Gül
120 kg	(Turkey) Rıza Kayaalp	(Turkey) İsmail Güzel	(Iran) Mohammad Ghorbani

== Participating nations ==
- Turkey
- Azerbaijan
- Iran
- Russia
- Poland
- Belarus
- Ukraine
- Jordan
- Sweden
- Georgia
- Finland
- Greece
- Kazakhstan
