= Emrah Kuş =

Turkish Greco-Roman wrestler

Personal information
- Nationality: Turkish
- Born: October 13, 1988 (age 37) Çorum, Turkey
- Height: 1.77 m (5 ft 10 in)
- Weight: 82 kg (181 lb)

Sport
- Country: Turkey
- Sport: Sport wrestling
- Event: Greco-Roman wrestling
- Club: Bursa Büyükşehir Belediyespor
- Coached by: Cengiz Papağan/Kemal Karadağ
Medal record
Representing Turkey
Men's Greco-Roman wrestling
World Championships
Silver medal – second place	2018 Budapest	82 kg
Bronze medal – third place	2013 Budapest	74 kg
European Championships
Bronze medal – third place	2019 Bucharest	82 kg
Mediterranean Games
Gold medal – first place	2013 Mersin	74 kg
Islamic Solidarity Games
Bronze medal – third place	2021 Konya	82 kg
Vehbi Emre & Hamit Kaplan Tournament
Gold medal – first place	2014 Istanbul	75 kg
Gold medal – first place	2015 Istanbul	75 kg
Silver medal – second place	2018 Istanbul	82 kg
Bronze medal – third place	2010 Istanbul	74 kg
Grand Prix
Gold medal – first place	2018 Mahshahr	82 kg
Gold medal – first place	2018 Warsaw	82 kg
Gold medal – first place	2021 Nice	82 kg
Gold medal – first place	2022 Tunis	82 kg
Silver medal – second place	2019 Zagreb	82 kg
Silver medal – second place	2019 Minsk	82 kg
European Juniors Championships
Gold medal – first place	2007 Belgrade	74 kg

Emrah Kuş (born 13 October 1988 in Çorum, Turkey) is a Turkish Greco-Roman wrestler. Competing for İzmir Büyükşehir Belediyespor, he is coached by Cengiz Papağan and Kemal Karadağ.

At the 17th Mediterranean Games held in Mersin, Turkey in 2013, he became gold medalist. He won the bronze medal in the 74 kg division at the 2013 World Wrestling Championships.

In 2022, he won one of the bronze medals in the men's Greco-Roman 82 kg event at the 2021 Islamic Solidarity Games held in Konya, Turkey.
