= 2020 Grand Prix Zagreb Open =

- Host city: Zagreb, Croatia
- Dates: November 07–08, 2020
- Stadium: Dom Sportova

The 2020 Grand Prix Zagreb Open was a wrestling event held in Zagreb, Croatia between 07 and 08 of November 2020.

== Medal table ==
Rank	Nation	Gold	Silver	Bronze	Total
1	Turkey	4	4	1	9
2	Moldova	2	3	0	5
3	Croatia	1	2	3	6
4	Serbia	1	0	5	6
5	Sweden	1	0	4	5
Totals (5 entries)		9	9	13	31

== Team ranking ==
Rank	Men's Greco-Roman	
Rank	Team	Points
1	Turkey	225
2	Croatia	188
3	Serbia	147
4	Moldova	126
5	Sweden	119
6	Switzerland	10

== Men's Greco-Roman ==
November 7–8, 2020

Event	Gold	Silver	Bronze
55 kg	Ekrem Öztürk; Turkey	Şerif Kılıç; Turkey	Sebastian Kolompar; Serbia
60 kg	Kerem Kamal; Turkey	Victor Ciobanu; Moldova	Ardit Fazljija; Sweden
67 kg	Donior Islamov; Moldova	Atakan Yüksel; Turkey	Sebastian Nadj; Serbia
72 kg	Dominik Etlinger; Croatia	Valentin Petic; Moldova	Selçuk Can; Turkey
72 kg	Dominik Etlinger; Croatia	Valentin Petic; Moldova	Davor Štefanek; Serbia
77 kg	Daniel Cataraga; Moldova	Alexandrin Gutu; Moldova	Viktor Nemeš; Serbia
77 kg	Daniel Cataraga; Moldova	Alexandrin Gutu; Moldova	Lukas Ahlgren; Sweden
82 kg	Burhan Akbudak; Turkey	Salih Aydın; Turkey	Alex Kessidis; Sweden
82 kg	Burhan Akbudak; Turkey	Salih Aydın; Turkey	Karlo Kodrič; Croatia
87 kg	Oskar Johansson; Sweden	Ivan Huklek; Croatia	Filip Smetko; Croatia
87 kg	Oskar Johansson; Sweden	Ivan Huklek; Croatia	Zurabi Datunashvili; Serbia
97 kg	Mihail Kadzaia; Serbia	Cenk İldem; Turkey	Pontus Lund; Sweden
130 kg	Rıza Kayaalp; Turkey	Marko Koščević; Croatia	Ante Milković; Croatia

== Participating nations ==
56 competitors from 6 nations participated.

- Croatia(15)
- Moldova(7)
- Serbia(11)
- Sweden(9)
- Switzerland(1)
- Turkey(14)
