= 2015 Vehbi Emre & Hamit Kaplan Tournament =

- Host city: Turkey, Istanbul
- Dates: 4–5 April
- Stadium: Ahmet Comert Sports Complex

The 33rd Vehbi Emre & Hamit Kaplan Tournament 2015, was a wrestling event held in Istanbul, Turkey between 4 and 5 January 2015.

This international tournament includes competition men's Greco-Roman wrestling. This ranking tournament was held in honor of the Olympic Champion, Hamit Kaplan and Turkish Wrestler and manager Vehbi Emre.

== Medal table ==
Rank	Nation	Gold	Silver	Bronze	Total
1	Turkey	6	2	3	11
2	Hungary	1	1	1	3
3	Azerbaijan	1	0	1	2
4	Kyrgyzstan	0	1	2	3
5	Bulgaria	0	1	1	2
5	Kazakhstan	0	1	1	2
7	Belarus	0	1	0	1
7	Denmark	0	1	0	1
9	Georgia	0	0	3	3
10	Iran	0	0	2	2
11	Romania	0	0	1	1
11	Uzbekistan	0	0	1	1
Totals (12 entries)		8	8	16	32

== Greco-Roman ==
Event	Gold	Silver	Bronze
59 kg	(Azerbaijan) Elman Mukhtarov	(Kyrgyzstan) Arsen Eraliev	(Turkey) Fatih Üçüncü
59 kg	(Azerbaijan) Elman Mukhtarov	(Kyrgyzstan) Arsen Eraliev	(Azerbaijan) Taleh Mammadov
66 kg	(Turkey) Abdulsamet Uğurli	(Kazakhstan) Aibek Yensekhanov	(Georgia (country)) Shmagi Bolkvadze
66 kg	(Turkey) Abdulsamet Uğurli	(Kazakhstan) Aibek Yensekhanov	(Turkey) Cengiz Arslan
71 kg	(Hungary) Tamás Lőrincz	(Turkey) Yunus Özel	(Kyrgyzstan) Ruslan Tsarev
71 kg	(Hungary) Tamás Lőrincz	(Turkey) Yunus Özel	(Georgia (country)) Sachino Davitaia
75 kg	(Turkey) Emrah Kuş	(Denmark) Mark Madsen	(Georgia (country)) Zurabi Datunashvili
75 kg	(Turkey) Emrah Kuş	(Denmark) Mark Madsen	(Hungary) László Szabó
80 kg	(Turkey) Aslan Atem	(Bulgaria) Daniel Aleksandrov	(Kazakhstan) Askhat Dilmukhamedov
80 kg	(Turkey) Aslan Atem	(Bulgaria) Daniel Aleksandrov	(Iran) Yousef Ghaderian
85 kg	(Turkey) Metehan Başar	(Hungary) Viktor Lőrincz	(Uzbekistan) Rustam Assakalov
85 kg	(Turkey) Metehan Başar	(Hungary) Viktor Lőrincz	(Turkey) Kansu İldem
98 kg	(Turkey) Cenk İldem	(Belarus) Aleksander Hrabovik	(Romania) Alin Alexuc-Ciurariu
98 kg	(Turkey) Cenk İldem	(Belarus) Aleksander Hrabovik	(Bulgaria) Ivan Stoyanov
130 kg	(Turkey) Rıza Kayaalp	(Turkey) Ali Nail Arslan	(Kyrgyzstan) Murat Ramonov
130 kg	(Turkey) Rıza Kayaalp	(Turkey) Ali Nail Arslan	(Iran) Behnam Mehdizadeh

== Participating nations ==
- Algeria
- Azerbaijan
- Belarus
- Bulgaria
- Denmark
- Estonia
- Finland
- Georgia
- Germany
- Greece
- Hungary
- Iran
- Kazakhstan
- Kyrgyzstan
- Lithuania
- Morocco
- Romania
- Tajikistan
- Turkey
- Turkmenistan
- Uzbekistan
