= 2017 Vehbi Emre & Hamit Kaplan Tournament =

- Host city: Turkey, Istanbul
- Dates: 4–5 March
- Stadium: Ahmet Comert Sports Complex

The 35th Vehbi Emre & Hamit Kaplan Tournament 2017, was a wrestling event held in Istanbul, Turkey between 4 and 5 March 2017.

This international tournament includes competition men's Greco-Roman wrestling. This ranking tournament was held in honor of the Olympic Champion, Hamit Kaplan and Turkish Wrestler and manager Vehbi Emre.

== Medal overview ==
=== Medal table ===
Rank	Nation	Gold	Silver	Bronze	Total
1	Turkey	6	3	6	15
2	Belarus	1	2	0	3
3	Kyrgyzstan	1	1	1	3
4	Azerbaijan	0	1	2	3
5	Uzbekistan	0	1	0	1
6	Georgia	0	0	6	6
7	Bulgaria	0	0	1	1
Totals (7 entries)		8	8	16	32

=== Greco-Roman ===
Event	Gold	Silver	Bronze
59 kg	(Kyrgyzstan) Khasan Suleimanov	(Kyrgyzstan) Kanybek Zholchubekov	(Turkey) Mustafa Sağlam
59 kg	(Kyrgyzstan) Khasan Suleimanov	(Kyrgyzstan) Kanybek Zholchubekov	(Azerbaijan) Murad Mammadov
66 kg	(Turkey) Atakan Yüksel	(Belarus) Soslan Daurov	(Kyrgyzstan) Nurbek Abduganiev
66 kg	(Turkey) Atakan Yüksel	(Belarus) Soslan Daurov	(Turkey) Abdülsamet Günal
71 kg	(Turkey) İlker Sönmez	(Turkey) Murat Dağ	(Turkey) Feyzi Topçu
71 kg	(Turkey) İlker Sönmez	(Turkey) Murat Dağ	(Georgia (country)) Giorgi Javakhia
75 kg	(Turkey) Fatih Cengiz	(Turkey) Serkan Akkoyun	(Azerbaijan) Hasan Aliyev
75 kg	(Turkey) Fatih Cengiz	(Turkey) Serkan Akkoyun	(Georgia (country)) Mindia Tsulukidze
80 kg	(Turkey) Burhan Akbudak	(Belarus) Radzik Kuliyeu	(Georgia (country)) Dzamashvili Tornike
80 kg	(Turkey) Burhan Akbudak	(Belarus) Radzik Kuliyeu	(Georgia (country)) Giorgi Tsirekidze
85 kg	(Turkey) Metehan Başar	(Azerbaijan) Islam Abbasov	(Bulgaria) Nikolay Byrakov
85 kg	(Turkey) Metehan Başar	(Azerbaijan) Islam Abbasov	(Georgia (country)) Mate Sopadze
98 kg	(Belarus) Aleksander Hrabovik	(Turkey) Süleyman Demirci	(Turkey) İlker Genel
98 kg	(Belarus) Aleksander Hrabovik	(Turkey) Süleyman Demirci	(Turkey) Cenk İldem
130 kg	(Turkey) Rıza Kayaalp	(Uzbekistan) Muminjon Abdullaev	(Turkey) Osman Yıldırım
130 kg	(Turkey) Rıza Kayaalp	(Uzbekistan) Muminjon Abdullaev	(Georgia (country)) Beka Kandelaki

== Participating nations ==
- Azerbaijan
- Belarus
- Brazil
- Bulgaria
- Georgia
- Kyrgyzstan
- Iran
- Turkey
- Uzbekistan
