= Yozgat Bozok University =

Public university in Yozgat, Turkey

Coordinates: 39.7765°N 34.8006°E

- Yozgat Bozok Üniversitesi
- Established: 2006
- Location: Çapanoğlu Mah. Cemil Çiçek Cad. No: 217/1 66100, Yozgat, Turkey
- Campus: Rural
- Website: Official website

Yozgat Bozok University (Turkish: Yozgat Bozok Üniversitesi) is a university located in Yozgat, Turkey. It was established in 2006.

== Affiliations ==
The university is a member of the Balkan Universities Network and Caucasus University Association.
