= Şeref Tüfenk =

Turkish wrestler (born 1983)

Personal information
- Nationality: Turkey
- Born: 22 September 1983 (age 42) Rize, Turkey
- Height: 1.72 m (5 ft 7 1/2 in)
- Weight: 74 kg (163 lb)

Sport
- Sport: Wrestling
- Event: Greco-Roman
- Club: İstanbul Büyükşehir Belediyespor
- Coached by: Hakkı Başar
- Retired: 2017
Medal record
Men's Greco-Roman wrestling
Representing Turkey
European Championships
Silver medal – second place	2008 Tampere	74 kg
World Cup
Gold medal – first place	2013 Tehran	74 kg
Gold medal – first place	2012 Saransk	74 kg
Bronze medal – third place	2007 Saransk	74 kg
Bronze medal – third place	2003 Alma-Ata	74 kg
Mediterranean Games
Gold medal – first place	2009 Pescara	74 kg
Vehbi Emre & Hamit Kaplan Tournament
Gold medal – first place	2010 Istanbul	74 kg
Gold medal – first place	2013 Istanbul	74 kg
Golden Grand Prix
Gold medal – first place	2012 Istanbul	74 kg
Silver medal – second place	2014 Dortmund	74 kg
Bronze medal – third place	2015 Madrid	75 kg
Dan Kolov & Nikola Petrov Tournament
Silver medal – second place	2009 Varna	74 kg
Bronze medal – third place	2008 Sofia	74 kg
Summer Universiade
Gold medal – first place	2005 İzmir	74 kg
World University Championship
Gold medal – first place	2006 Oulan Bator	74 kg
Gold medal – first place	2004 Lodz	66 kg
Bronze medal – third place	2010 Torino	74 kg
World Juniors Championships
Gold medal – first place	2003 Istanbul	58 kg
Gold medal – first place	2001 Tashkent	58 kg
European Juniors Championships
Gold medal – first place	2002 Subotica	63 kg

Şeref Tüfenk (born September 22, 1983, in Rize) is a Turkish amateur Greco-Roman wrestler, who competed for the men's middleweight category. He is a two-time Olympian and a silver medalist for the 74 kg division at the 2008 European Wrestling Championships in Tampere, Finland. He studied at Ondokuz Mayıs University.

Tufenk made his official debut for the 2004 Summer Olympics in Athens, where he placed second in the preliminary pool of the men's lightweight class (60 kg), against Cuba's Roberto Monzón, Iran's Ali Ashkani, and Greece's Christos Gikas. In 2005, he won the gold medal at the Summer Universiade in İzmir, Turkey.

At the 2008 Summer Olympics in Beijing, Tufenk switched to a heavier class by competing in the men's 74 kg division. Unfortunately, he lost the qualifying round match to Azerbaijan's Ilgar Abdulov, with a two-set technical score (1–2, 1–1), and a classification point score of 1–3.

He also defeated France's Christophe Guénot for the gold medal in the same division at the 2009 Mediterranean Games in Pescara, Italy.
