= Beka Kandelaki =

Azerbaijani Greco-Roman wrestler

Beka Kandelaki ბექა კანდელაკი
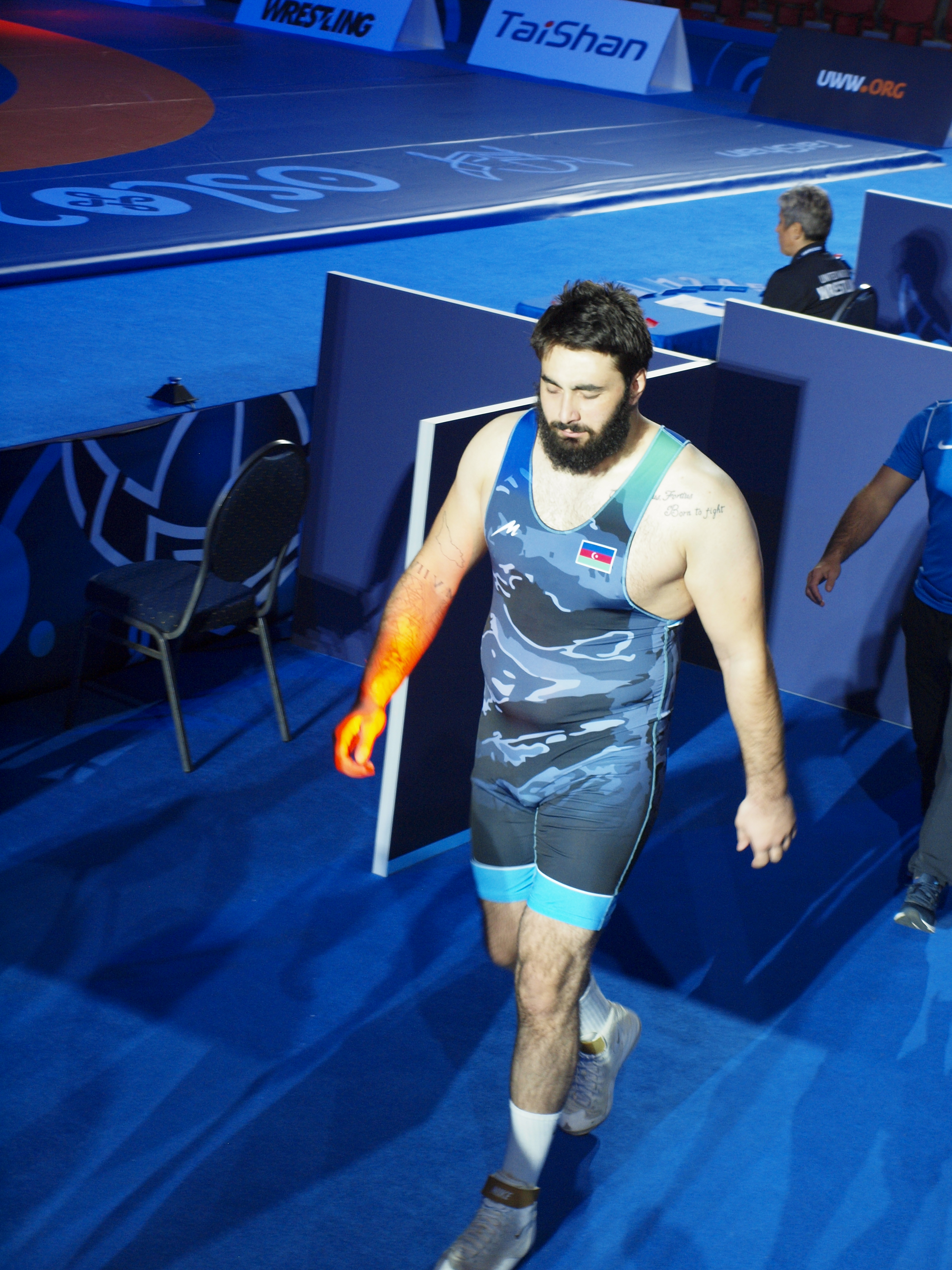

Personal information
- National team: Azerbaijan
- Born: 17 May 1995 (age 31) Georgia
- Height: 195 cm (6 ft 5 in)
- Weight: 130 kg (290 lb)

Sport
- Country: Georgia (2011–2017); Azerbaijan (2019–present)
- Sport: Amateur wrestling
- Event: Greco-Roman
- Coached by: Tinikashvili Vaja
Medal record
Men's freestyle wrestling
Representing Azerbaijan
European Championships
Bronze medal – third place	2024 Bucharest	130 kg
World Cup
Silver medal – second place	2022 Baku	Team
Individual World Cup
Bronze medal – third place	2020 Belgrade	130 kg
Grand Prix
Silver medal – second place	2022 Rome	130 kg
Silver medal – second place	2023 Budapest	130 kg
Vehbi Emre & Hamit Kaplan
Silver medal – second place	2022 Istanbul	130 kg
Representing Georgia
Vehbi Emre & Hamit Kaplan
Silver medal – second place	2016 Istanbul	130 kg
Bronze medal – third place	2017 Istanbul	130 kg
European Juniors Championships
Gold medal – first place	2014 Katowice	120 kg
European Cadets Championships
Silver medal – second place	2012 Baku	100 kg

Beka Kandelaki (ბექა კანდელაკი; born 17 May 1995) is a Georgian-Azerbaijani Greco-Roman wrestler who currently competes at 130 kilograms.

== Wrestling career ==
He won one of the bronze medals in the 130 kg event at the 2024 European Wrestling Championships held in Bucharest, Romania. He competed at the 2024 European Wrestling Olympic Qualification Tournament in Baku, Azerbaijan hoping to qualify for the 2024 Summer Olympics in Paris, France. He was eliminated in his third match and he did not qualify for the Olympics.
