= Bashir Babajanzadeh =

Iranian Greco-Roman wrestler

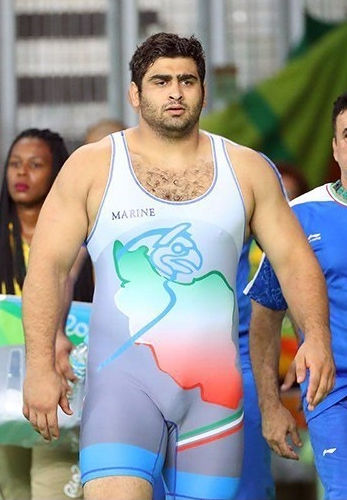
- Babajanzadeh at the 2016 Olympics

Personal information
- Born: August 9, 1989 (age 37) Babol, Iran
- Height: 188 cm (6 ft 2 in)
- Weight: 130 kg (287 lb)

Sport
- Sport: Greco-Roman wrestling
- Club: Zeed wrestling club
- Coached by: Sayed Hashem Mirzadeh (2000–)
Medal record
Representing Iran
World Championships
Bronze medal – third place	2011 Istanbul	120 kg
Asian Games
Bronze medal – third place	2014 Incheon	130 kg
Asian Championships
Gold medal – first place	2011 Tashkent	120 kg
Bronze medal – third place	2015 Doha	130 kg

Bashir Babajanzadeh Darzi (Persian: بشير باباجان‌زاده درزى; born 9 or 20 August 1989) is a heavyweight Greco-Roman wrestler from Iran. He won bronze medals at the 2011 World Championships and 2014 Asian Games, and reached the quarterfinals at the 2016 Olympics. He was suspended for doping, for four years from 31 August 2016 until 30 August 2020, by United World Wrestling which found the presence of testosterone, an anabolic steroid.

== Professional Athletic Career of Bashir Babajanzadeh ==
=== 2011 Asian Championships ===
In the 120 kg weight category, Bashir Babajanzadeh, after a bye in the first round, defeated Ali Salman from Iraq in the second round in two periods. In the semifinals, he overcame Mohammad Marafi from Jordan in two periods. Babajanzadeh then secured the gold medal by defeating Kyong Ming from China in two periods in the final match.

=== 2011 World Championships ===
Babajanzadeh advanced to the semifinals with four victories over Gogi Svanidze from Georgia, Gogoshvili from Georgia, Anuchin from Russia, and Johan Eurén from Sweden. However, he lost to Mikhail Lopez from Cuba in the semifinals and moved to the bronze medal match. He managed to defeat Lukasz Banak from Poland and won the bronze medal in the heavyweight category.

=== 2012 London Olympics ===
Bashir Babajanzadeh qualified for the London Olympics in the 120 kg weight category by winning a bronze medal at the 2011 World Wrestling Championships in Istanbul. In the first round, he defeated Ali Nazim from Iraq and then won a tough match against Yuri Patrikeev, the bronze medalist of the 2008 Beijing Olympics, in the next round. However, he lost to Johan Eurén from Sweden in the subsequent round and was eliminated from the competition, finishing in seventh place.

=== 2012 Asian Championships ===
In the 120 kg weight category, Bashir Babajanzadeh defeated an opponent from India in the second round but lost to his Tajik opponent due to apparent biased judging. Since his Tajik opponent lost to a South Korean wrestler, Babajanzadeh was eliminated from the competition.

=== 2014 Asian Games ===
Babajanzadeh won his first match against Darmendar Dalal from India, advancing to the quarterfinals. However, he lost to Nurmakhan Tinaliyev from Kazakhstan, the third-ranked wrestler in the world and the Asian Games champion, in the next round. Since Tinaliyev advanced to the final, Babajanzadeh moved to the repechage rounds. He defeated Abrorbek Mamasoliev from Uzbekistan in the repechage and advanced to the bronze medal match, where he won against Murad Ramazanov from Kyrgyzstan, securing the bronze medal.

=== 2015 Asian Championships ===
In the 130 kg weight category, Bashir Babajanzadeh defeated Murat Ramonov from Kyrgyzstan in the first round with a score of 4–1. In the quarterfinals, he beat Mohammad Ibrahim from Bahrain with a score of 8–0, advancing to the semifinals. However, he lost to Nurmakhan Tinaliyev from Kazakhstan, the 2014 Asian Games champion and world bronze medalist, due to a controversial decision and moved to the bronze medal match. Babajanzadeh defeated Navin from India with a score of 11-0 and won the bronze medal.

=== 2016 Rio Olympics ===
Babajanzadeh competed in the 130 kg weight category at the 2016 Rio Olympics. He won his first match against Kang Meng from China but lost to Eduard Popp from Germany in the next round. As Popp was eliminated in the following round, Babajanzadeh was also eliminated from the competition.

== Ban from Wrestling ==
According to the announcement by the United World Wrestling, Bashir Babajanzadeh was banned for four years from sports activities due to doping during the 2016 Shiraz World Cup after the Rio Olympics.
