= Radhouane Chebbi =

Tunisian wrestler (born 1986)

Personal information
- Nationality: Tunisia
- Born: 8 August 1985 (age 41) Tunis, Tunisia
- Height: 1.86 m (6 ft 1 in)
- Weight: 117 kg (258 lb)

Sport
- Sport: Wrestling
- Event: Greco-Roman

Radhouane Chebbi (Arabic: رضوان الشابي; born August 8, 1986, in Tunis) is an amateur Tunisian Greco-Roman wrestler, who competes in the men's super heavyweight category. Chebbi represented Tunisia at the 2012 Summer Olympics in London, where he competed in the men's 120 kg class. He received a bye for the preliminary round of sixteen match, before losing out to Poland's Łukasz Banak, who was able to score three points in two straight periods, leaving Chebbi without a single point.
