= Eduard Popp =

German wrestler

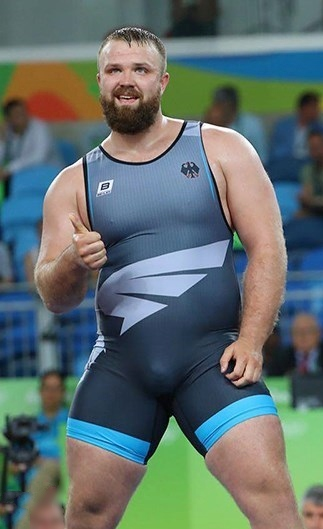
- Popp at the 2016 Olympics

Personal information
- Born: 16 June 1991 (age 35) Barnaul, Russian SFSR
- Height: 190 cm (6 ft 3 in)
- Weight: 128 kg (282 lb)

Sport
- Sport: Greco-Roman wrestling
- Club: Red DEVILS Heilbronn
- Coached by: Marcus Mackamul
Medal record
Men's Greco-Roman wrestling
Representing Germany
European Championships
Bronze medal – third place	2021 Warsaw	130 kg

Eduard Popp (born 16 June 1991) is a Russian-born German heavyweight Greco-Roman wrestler. He won the national title in 2013 and 2014 and reached semifinals at the 2016 Summer Olympics.

In 2020, he competed in the men's 130 kg event at the 2020 Individual Wrestling World Cup held in Belgrade, Serbia. In 2021, he won one of the bronze medals in his event at the 2021 Wladyslaw Pytlasinski Cup held in Warsaw, Poland. He also competed in the men's 130 kg event at the 2020 Summer Olympics held in Tokyo, Japan.

== Personal life ==
When Popp was two years old, his family moved from Barnaul to Germany. In 1997, he took up Greco-Roman wrestling in the German city of Möckmühl. He is married and the father of two children.
