= Łukasz Banak =

Polish Greco-Roman wrestler

Personal information
- Nationality: Poland
- Born: 4 September 1983 (age 42) Międzyrzecz, Poland
- Height: 1.86 m (6 ft 1 in)
- Weight: 120 kg (265 lb)

Sport
- Sport: Wrestling
- Event: Greco-Roman
- Club: WKS Śląsk Wrocław
- Coached by: Jozef Tracz

Łukasz Banak (born 4 September 1983 in Międzyrzecz) is an amateur Polish Greco-Roman wrestler, who competed in the men's super heavyweight category. He won a bronze medal in his division at the 2007 CISM World Military Games in Hyderabad, India. He is also a member of WKS Slansk in Wrocław, and is coached and trained by Jozef Tracz.

Banak represented Poland at the 2012 Summer Olympics in London, where he competed in the men's 120 kg class. He defeated Tunisia's Radhouane Chebbi in the preliminary round of sixteen, before losing out the quarterfinal match to Estonia's Heiki Nabi, who was able to score one point each in two straight periods, leaving Banak without a single point. Because his opponent advanced further into the final match, Banak had another shot for the bronze medal by entering the repechage bouts. Unfortunately, he was defeated in the first round by Belarus' Ioseb Chugoshvili, with a technical score of 0–3.
