= Atilla Güzel =

Turkish Greco-Roman wrestler (born 1984)

Personal information
- Nationality: Turkish
- Born: 14 February 1984 (age 42) Konya, Turkey

Sport
- Country: Turkey
- Sport: Wrestling
- Event: Greco-Roman
- Club: Konya Büyükşehir Belediyespor
Medal record
Men's Greco-Roman wrestling
Representing Turkey
European Championships
Bronze medal – third place	2008 Tampere	120 kg

Atilla Güzel (born 14 February 1984) is a Turkish Greco-Roman wrestler who competed in the 120 kg category. He won a bronze medal at the 2008 European Wrestling Championships in Tampere and also competed in Turkish oil wrestling.

== Career ==
Güzel was born in Konya and wrestled for Konya Büyükşehir Belediyespor. He took the bronze medal in the 120 kg Greco-Roman event at the 2008 European Championships in Tampere, Finland. He also placed at the Dan Kolov – Nikola Petrov tournament and appeared in the World Cup.

Alongside Greco-Roman he competed in traditional Turkish oil wrestling, reaching the final stages of the Kırkpınar tournament.
