= Ioseb Chugoshvili =

Belarusian Greco-Roman wrestler

Personal information
- Full name: Ioseb Ivanesh Chugoshvili
- Nationality: Belarus
- Born: 29 July 1986 (age 40) Telavi, Georgia
- Height: 1.88 m (6 ft 2 in)
- Weight: 120 kg (265 lb)

Sport
- Sport: Wrestling
- Event: Greco-Roman
- Club: Army Wrestling Club Minsk
- Coached by: Komandar Madzhidov
Medal record
Men's Greco-Roman wrestling
Representing Belarus
European Games
Bronze medal – third place	2015 Baku	130 kg
European Championships
Bronze medal – third place	2016 Riga	130 kg

Ioseb Ivanesh Chugoshvili (Georgian: იოსებ ივანეს ჩუგოშვილი; born July 29, 1986, in Telavi, Georgia) is an amateur Belarusian Greco-Roman wrestler of Georgian origin, who competes in the men's super heavyweight category. Chugoshvili represented Belarus at the 2012 Summer Olympics in London, where he competed in the 120 kg class, an event which was dominated by defending Olympic champion Mijaín López of Cuba. He was eliminated in his first preliminary match against Estonia's Heiki Nabi, with a technical score of 1–4 after two periods, and a classification score of 1–3. Because Nabi advanced further into the final match against López, Chugoshvili offered another shot for an Olympic bronze medal through the repechage bouts. He first defeated Poland's Łukasz Banak, but lost the bronze medal match to Sweden's Johan Euren, who stopped him with a par terre position in order to score a point each in two out of three periods.
