= Oleksandr Chernetskyi =

Ukrainian Greco-Roman wrestler

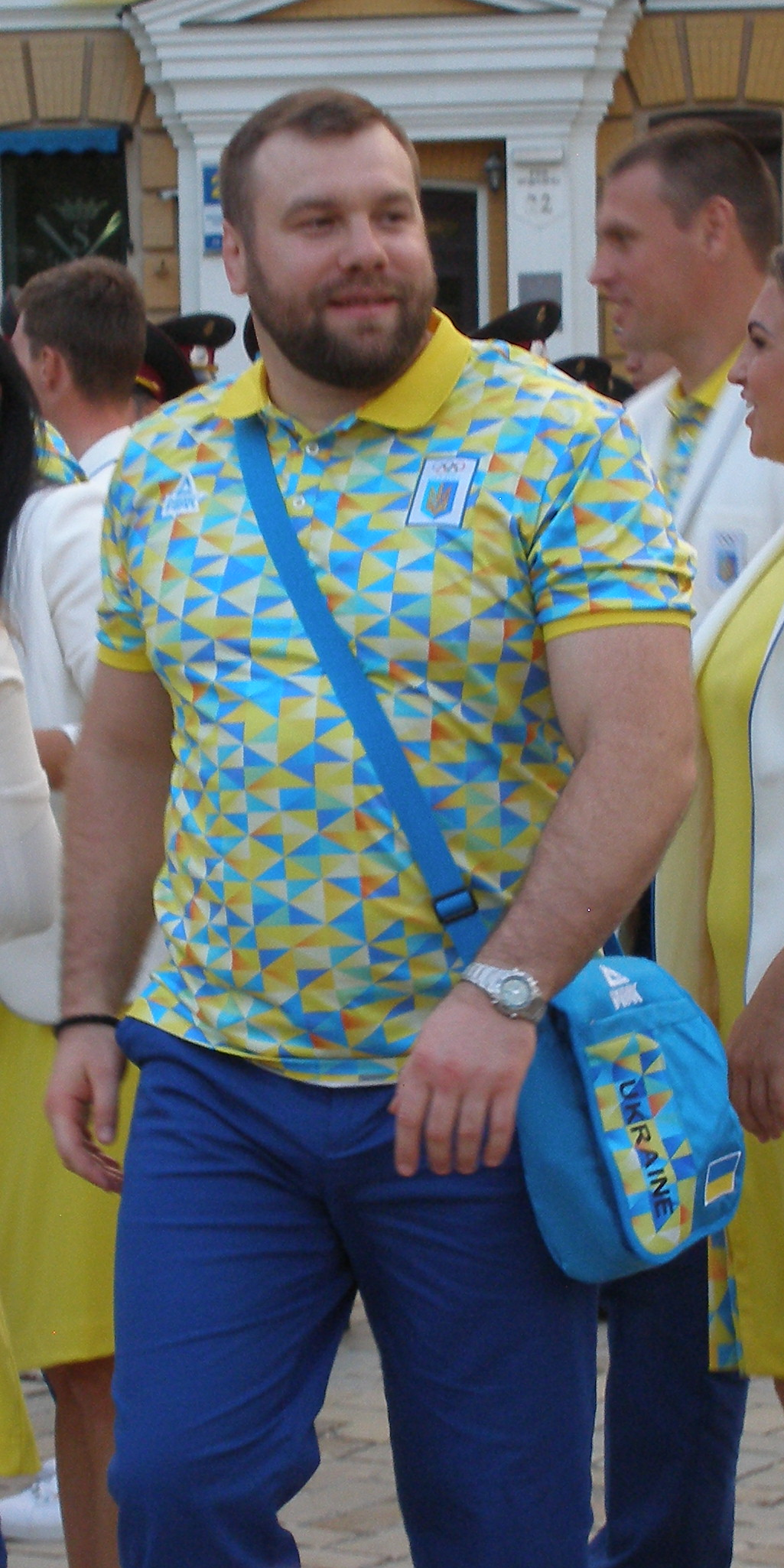
- Oleksandr Chernetskyi in 2016

Personal information
- Full name: Oleksandr Stepanovych; Chernetskyi
- Nationality: Ukraine
- Born: 17 February 1984 (age 42) Dolyna, Ivano-Frankivsk Oblast, Ukrainian SSR, Soviet Union
- Height: 1.90 m (6 ft 3 in)
- Weight: 120 kg (265 lb)

Sport
- Sport: Wrestling
- Event: Greco-Roman
- Club: CSKA Kiev
- Coached by: Stepan Chernetskyi (father)
Medal record
Men's Greco-Roman wrestling
Representing Ukraine
World Championships
Bronze medal – third place	2015 Las Vegas	130 kg
European Championships
Bronze medal – third place	2006 Moscow	120 kg
Silver medal – second place	2016 Riga	130 kg
Military Games
Silver medal – second place	2015 Mungyeong	130 kg

Oleksandr Stepanovych Chernetskyi (Ukrainian: Олександр Степанович Чернецький, also transliterated Chernetsʼkyy or Chernetskyy, born February 17, 1984, in Dolyna, Ivano-Frankivsk Oblast) is an amateur Ukrainian Greco-Roman wrestler, who wrestled for the men's super heavyweight category.

== Career ==
He won a bronze medal for his category at the 2006 European Wrestling Championships in Moscow, Russia. He is also a member of the wrestling club at CSKA Kiev, and is coached and trained by his father Stepan Chernetskyi.

Chernetskyi represented Ukraine at the 2008 Summer Olympics in Beijing, where he competed for the men's 120 kg class. He lost the qualifying round match to U.S. wrestler Dremiel Byers, who was able to score three points in two straight periods, leaving Chernetskyi with a single point.

He also competed for Ukraine at the 2016 Summer Olympics.

He competed in the 130 kg event at the 2022 World Wrestling Championships held in Belgrade, Serbia.

He competed at the 2024 European Wrestling Olympic Qualification Tournament in Baku, Azerbaijan hoping to qualify for the 2024 Summer Olympics in Paris, France. He was eliminated in his first match and he did not qualify for the Olympics.
