= Johan Eurén =

Swedish sport wrestler

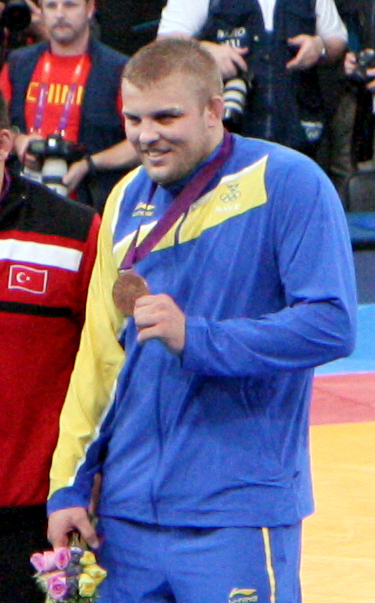
- Johan Eurén at the 2012 Olympics

Personal information
- Born: 18 May 1985 (age 41) Sävedalen, Partille Municipality, Sweden
- Height: 1.92 m (6 ft 4 in)
- Weight: 118 kg (260 lb)

Sport
- Sport: Wrestling
- Event: Greco-Roman
- Club: Örgryte IS, Gothenburg
Medal record
Men's Greco-Roman wrestling
Representing Sweden
Olympic Games
Bronze medal – third place	2012 London	120 kg
World Championships
Bronze medal – third place	2013 Budapest	120 kg
European Championships
Bronze medal – third place	2010 Baku	120 kg
Bronze medal – third place	2014 Vantaa	130 kg
Bronze medal – third place	2016 Riga	130 kg

Johan Eurén (born 18 May 1985) is a Swedish wrestler who won a bronze medal at the 2012 Summer Olympics in the Greco-Roman 120 kg category.
