= Sport in Estonia =

Sport plays an important role in Estonian culture. Estonia first competed as a nation at the 1920 Summer Olympics, although the National Olympic Committee was established in 1923. Estonian athletes took part at every Olympic Games until the country was annexed by the Soviet Union in 1940. The 1980 Summer Olympics sailing regatta was held in the capital city Tallinn. Estonia has won most of its Olympic medals in wrestling, athletics, weightlifting, and cross-country skiing. Basketball is the most popular spectator sport in Estonia.

== Athletics ==
Athletics is popular in Estonia, shown by number of medals won this field of sport. Jüri Lossmann came in second on the marathon at the 1920 Olympic Games. Aleksander Klumberg won the bronze medal in 1924 in the men's decathlon competition. Between 2000 and 2009, Estonia scored at least one medal in major international competition in every year: 2000, 2001, 2002, 2003, 2004, 2005, 2006, 2007, 2008, and 2009. Before that, Erki Nool won the gold medal in 1998.

- Notable athletes in Estonia: Erki Nool, Gerd Kanter, Andrus Värnik, Rasmus Mägi, Aleksander Tammert, Pavel Loskutov, Jüri Lossmann, Aleksander Klumberg

== Basketball ==
Basketball is a notable sport in Estonia, and has often been called the "national sport of Estonia". Estonia national basketball team participated in 1936 Summer Olympics and have appeared in EuroBasket eight times. They had twice finished EuroBasket on 5th place before Soviet occupation. Many Estonian players also represented and won medals with the Soviet team. After regaining independence, Estonia finished Eurobasket 6th in 1993. The domestic top-tier basketball championship is called the Korvpalli Meistriliiga. BC Kalev/Cramo has the best results in the recent years, while University of Tartu team has won the league a record 26 times. Estonian clubs also participate in European and regional competitions. Estonia will co-host the, EuroBasket in 2029 along with Greece, Slovenia and Spain marking the first time they have hosted the EuroBasket.

== Beach volleyball ==
- Kristjan Kais and Rivo Vesik have playing at the FIVB World Tour. In 2007, they won Zagreb Open and competed at the 2008 Summer Olympics. Their best result from World Championships was 5th.

Estonia featured national teams in beach volleyball that competed at the 2018–2020 CEV Beach Volleyball Continental Cup in both the women's and the men's sections.

== Cricket ==
The Estonia Cricket Association (ECA) was formed in 2007 and became members of the International Cricket Council in 2008. The ECA runs Men's and Women's leagues, playing 40-40, T20 and Super 8's competitions. It has member clubs in Tallinn and Tartu. Estonia is also home to a unique variant of the game in Ice cricket. The Ice Cricket World Championship was held annually in the Estonian city of Tallinn played upon the surface of a frozen lake.

== Cycling ==
- Jaan Kirsipuu has been the best Estonian road bicycle racer. He has won 4 Tour de France stages and 1 Vuelta a España stage. Kirsipuu also wore the yellow jersey for six days in the 1999 Tour de France.
- Erika Salumäe is an Estonian track bicycle racer who won the first Olympic gold medal for Estonia after the country regained its independence in 1991.
- Tanel Kangert has finished inside top 20 all the three Grand Tours - 13th place in 2013 Giro d'Italia, 11th place in 2013 Vuelta a España and 20th place in 2014 Tour de France. In 2014 Tour de France he helped Vincenzo Nibali to take the first place in General classification.
- Rein Taaramäe finished the 2011 Tour de France in 11th place and won the 14th stage of 2011 Vuelta a España. He also held the white jersey for Stage 8 and 9 in the 2012 Tour de France.
- Aavo Pikkuus won 1976 Olympic gold medal with Soviet Union team time trial event.

== Disc golf ==
Kristin Lätt is Estonia’s most successful disc golfer of all time, and in 2022 she achieved the highest PDGA rating of any Estonian female. She is the 2022 and 2023 Women's Professional Disc Golf Champion, and has also achieved the highest PDGA rating among all female athletes.

== Fencing ==
Épée fencing has been very successful for Estonia in the past few decades. Oksana Jermakova became the first fencing World Champion for Estonia winning Individual épée in 1993. Irina Embrich has won the most total medals for Estonia. Nikolai Novosjolov became the world champion in 2010 and 2013. At 2013 Championships Julia Beljajeva also won the gold medal. At the 2018 European Championships Estonian women took a triple win in the individual épée. Both women's and men's épée teams have won championship medals. Women's épée team became the Olympic champions at the 2020 Summer Olympics.

Estonia has won 17 World Fencing Championships medals and several European Fencing Championships medals.

- Notable fencers in Estonia: Julia Beljajeva, Irina Embrich, Sven Järve, Oksana Jermakova, Kaido Kaaberma, Erika Kirpu, Kristina Kuusk, Katrina Lehis, Nikolai Novosjolov and Maarika Võsu.

== Floorball ==
Estonia men's national floorball team has been successful at the World Championships with best result 7th and multiple 8th places.

== Football ==
Football is one of the most popular sports in Estonia by number of active players, although nothing special has been achieved. Estonia advanced to the 2012 UEFA European Football Championship qualifying play-offs.

== Freestyle skiing ==
Kelly Sildaru won women's slopestyle at 2015 Dew tour. At just 13 years old, Kelly Sildaru might be the smallest competitor in the field, but she brought the biggest run of the contest, spinning all four directions and showcasing technicality on the rails in the process. On the jumps, Kelly landed a switch right 900, right corked 720, switch left 900 and left 720, and the judges rewarded her with a 90.80 to put her into 1st place.

Kelly won Gold in the slopestyle event in the 2016 Winter X Games beating Tiril Sjåstad Christiansen. With this win, at age 13, Kelly became the youngest gold medalist to date at an X Games winter event. She was the gold medal favorite for the women's slopestyle event in 2018 Winter Olympics, but missed competing in the Games because of a knee injury. Her later career has not been so successful, but she managed to win bronze medal at the 2022 Olympics.

== Ice hockey ==
Ice hockey in Estonia is governed by the Estonian Ice Hockey Association (Eesti Jäähokiliit). The top-tier league of men's ice hockey in Estonia is the Meistriliiga (also known as Coolbet Hokiliiga for sponsorship reasons). The top-tier league of women's ice hockey in Estonia is the Naiste Hokiliiga.

== Judo ==
Judo is one of the most successful field of sport for Estonia. Since 1996, Estonia has won several medals in major international competitions.

- 3 Olympic medals
  - 3 Bronze medals: 2000 and 2004.
- 4 World Judo Championships medals
  - 3 Silver medals: 1999, 2001, 2003 and bronze medal in 2003.
- 15 European Judo Championships medals.
- Indrek Pertelson, Aleksei Budõlin and Martin Padar are the most famous Judo athletes in Estonia in the past years.

== Motocross ==
- Tanel Leok is an Estonian motocross racer competing in the Motocross World Championship in MX1 class.

== Racing ==
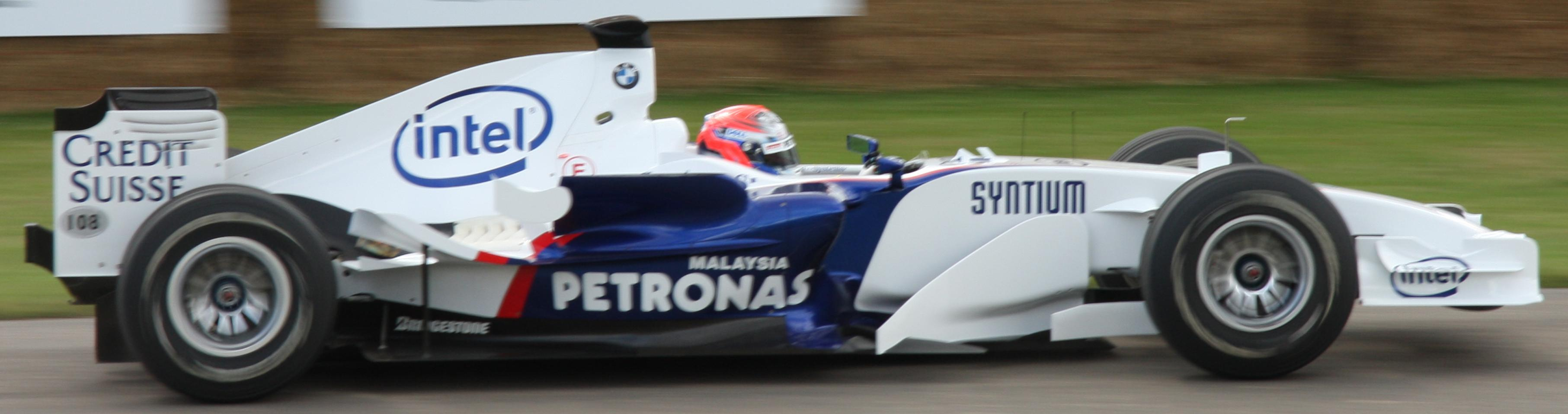
Marko Asmer driving Sauber F1.06 car at Goodwood Festival of Speed

- Paul Aron is an Estonian racing driver. He finished third in the FIA Formula 2 Championship driving with Hitech Grand Prix. Paul is currently a reserve driver for Alpine F1 Team.
- Ralf Aron is an Estonian racing driver. He became champion in the Italian F4 Championship in 2015.
- Marko Asmer is an Estonian auto racing driver, whose career in single seater junior formula is notable for his British Formula Three Championship title in 2007. Asmer is also the first Estonian racing driver to test a Formula One car.
- Tõnis Kasemets is an Estonia racing driver. He has driven in Champ Car World Series. His maiden achievement is the 2022 IMSA Prototype Challenge championship title.
- Kevin Korjus is an Estonian racing driver. He won the Eurocup Formula Renault 2.0 championship in 2010 and finished seventh in the GP3 Series in 2013.
- Sten Pentus is an Estonian racing driver who competed in Blancpain Sprint Series.
- Martin Rump is an Estonian racing driver and currently competing in European Le Mans Series. He is the only Estonian who has competed 24 Hours of Le Mans.
- Jüri Vips is an Estonian racing driver. Vips became champion of 2017 ADAC Formula 4 Championship. He is currently competing in the IndyCar Series with Rahal Letterman Lanigan Racing.

== Rallying ==
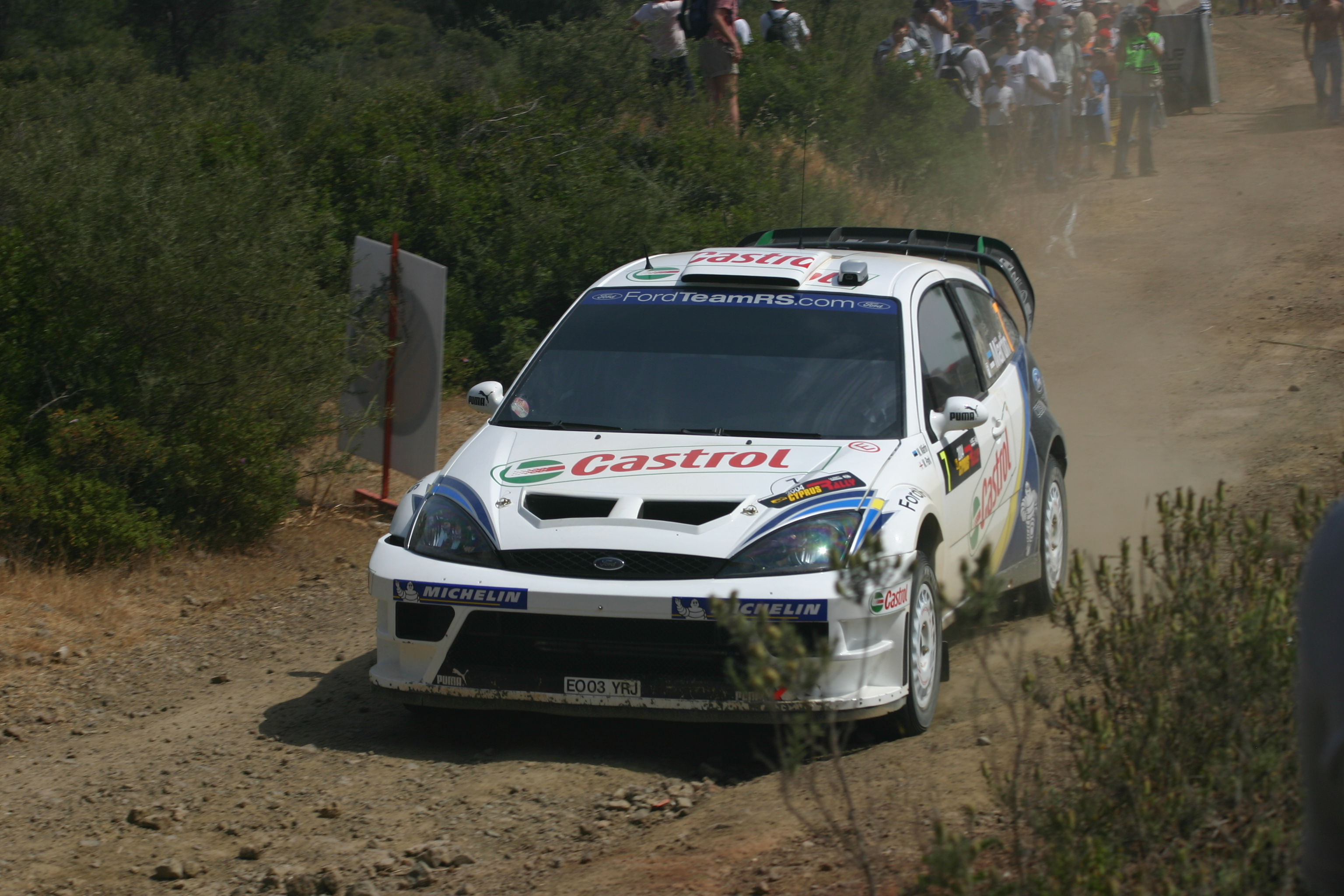
Markko Märtin has claimed 5 victories and 101 stage wins in his WRC career.

Rallying became popular in Estonia during the Soviet time and it is still one the most popular sports in Estonia. Legendary Estonian rally drivers like Heino Sepp, Heiki Ohu, Vello Õunpuu, Joel Tammeka and many more, achieved good results competing in the Soviet Union. These drivers made rallying very popular among Estonians. Every year there was Soviet Union National Rally Team where half of the rally drivers were from Estonia. Markko Märtin was the first Estonian to win WRC event, attracting Estonian rally fans more and more. Ott Tänak is the first Estonian to win the World Rally Championship title in 2019. Estonian WRC event, Rally Estonia, gathers thousands of rally fans to watch top level drivers competing.

- Markko Märtin was the first Estonian who won a number of rallies in the World Rally Championship. Markko has scored 5 WRC victories, total of 18 podium finishes, 207 points and 101 stage wins. In 2004, he finished the season with 3rd place. Markko was one of the best rally drivers, but retired after an accident in 2005. Rally fans from Estonia continued to be interested in WRC, visiting Rally Finland and other rallies.
- Ott Tänak is 2019 WRC Champion, and Martin Järveoja won the FIA World Rally Championship for Co-Drivers that season. Previously Tänak had repeated Märtin's achievement by finishing 3rd overall in 2017, winning his fifth rally in August 2018 and eventually surpassing Märtin by winning his sixth rally in September 2018. Tänak also finished 3rd overall in 2018, winning three rallies in a row and mathematically still being in the title race at the last rally of the season. He was the highest pointscorer for Toyota Gazoo Racing WRT that season, who won the Manufacturer's Championship that season.
- Rally Estonia was added to the World Rally Championship calendar from 2020.

== Rowing ==
Rowing is a popular sport in Estonia. One reason is Jüri Jaanson, but there are also other well-known rowers in Estonia. Between 2004 and 2009, Estonia scored at least one medal in major international competition in every year: 2004, 2005, 2006, 2007, 2008, and 2009. After six years Estonia won bronze medal in 2015.

Tõnu Endrekson, Andrei Jämsä, Allar Raja and Kaspar Taimsoo have also won an Olympic medal.

== Sailing ==
Twin brothers Tõnu Tõniste and Toomas Tõniste competed in four consecutive Summer Olympics, starting in 1988. They won a silver and a bronze medal in the Men's 470 Class, for the Soviet Union (silver, 1988) and for Estonia (bronze, 1992).

== Skiing ==
Skiing is very popular in Estonia. Otepää is a popular skiing resort. Otepää is also known as the "winter capital" of Estonia (in contrast to the "summer capital" Pärnu). It is also the annual Cross-country skiing World Cup event. The 2011 Nordic Junior World Ski Championships was held in Otepää also.

In 2000, Raul Olle won Vasaloppet, which is amongst the oldest, longest, and biggest cross-country ski races in the world.

In 1999 Estonian skiing found success at international level, winning medals at World Championships. Estonia has won 4 gold, 2 silver, and 1 bronze medal at the Winter Olympic Games.

- Olympic medals: 2002, 2006, and 2010.
- World Championships medals: 1999, 2001, 2003, and 2009.

Andrus Veerpalu, Kristina Šmigun-Vähi and Jaak Mae are some of the most popular athletes in Estonia.

== Speed skating ==
- Ants Antson (competing for the Soviet Union) won a gold medal at the 1964 Winter Olympics in Innsbruck, Austria for the 1500m. The same year he became the European Allround Champion and received the Oscar Mathisen Award.

== Swimming ==
- Swimming is a popular sport among Estonians. Estonian athletes have found some success at the European Short Course Swimming Championships – Indrek Sei, Jane Trepp, Triin Aljand and Martti Aljand have won medals in the past years.
- Triin Aljand won first long course swimming medal for Estonia in Debrecen 2012.

== Tennis ==
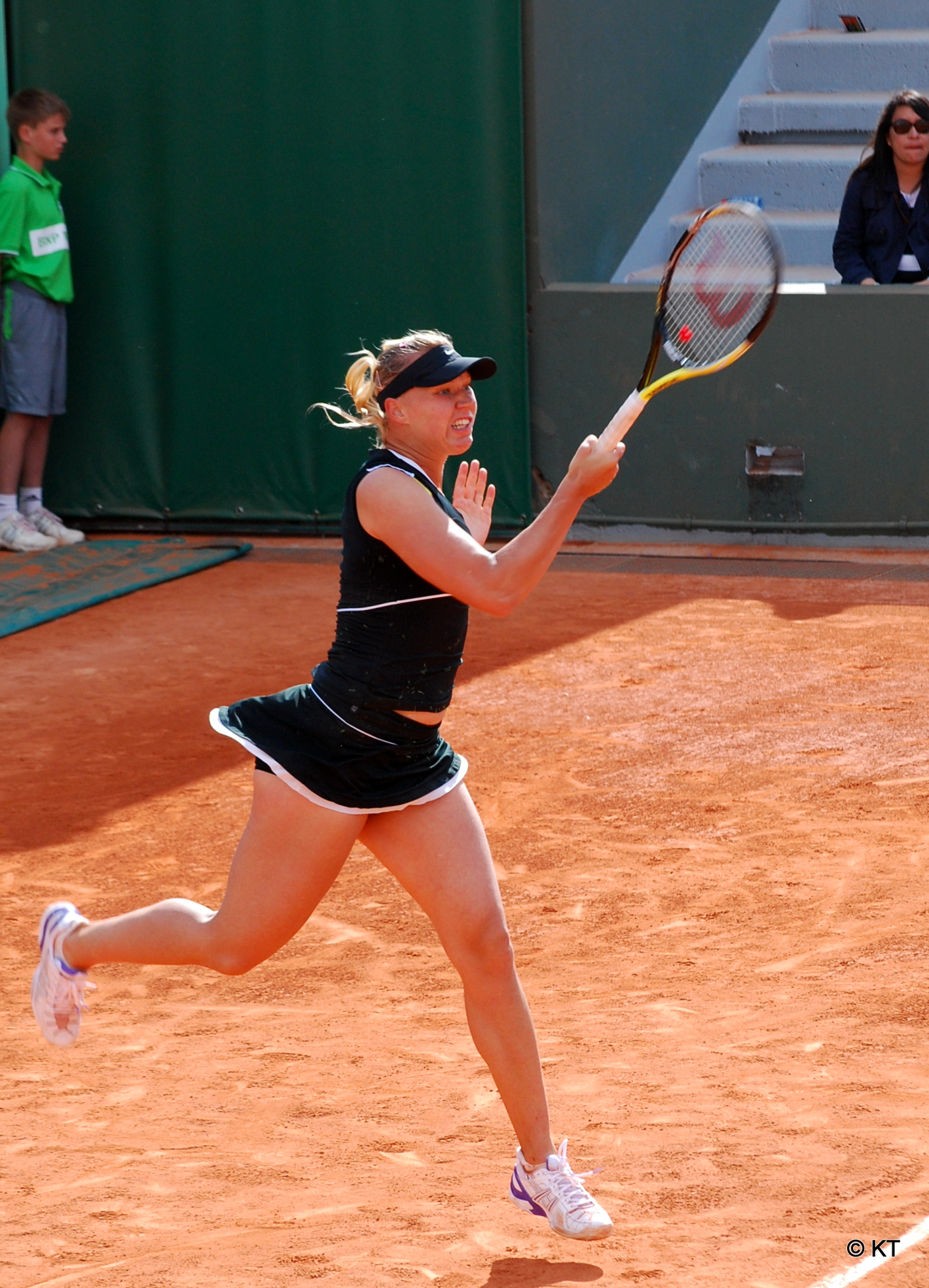
Kaia Kanepi at the 2011 French Open

- Kaia Kanepi is an Estonian professional female tennis player. Her career-high ranking was set at World No. 16 on 7 February 2011. Kanepi won her first WTA Tour Title in Palermo in 2010, becoming the first Estonian female player to win a WTA title. She has also reached six Grand Slam Quarter-finals, becoming the first Estonian to achieve this and was the first Estonian to be ranked in the top twenty.
- Jürgen Zopp made a breakthrough on the ATP tour in 2012, qualifying for the main draws of each the Australian Open, Roland Garros, and Wimbledon, and achieving his first main draw ATP tournament win in Bucharest, establishing himself as a top-100 player in the world rankings.
- Anett Kontaveit has won six singles titles on the WTA tour as well as eleven singles and five doubles titles on the ITF tour during her career. In June 2022, she reached her best singles ranking of world number 2, becoming the first Estonian singles player to reach the top 10 and highest-ranked of all time.

== Volleyball ==
- The Estonia men's national volleyball team finished the 2009 European Volleyball Championship in 14th place, the 2011 European Volleyball Championship in 12th place and the 2015 European Volleyball Championship in 11th place.

== Weightlifting ==
Weightlifting was one of the most successful field of sport for Estonia in the past. Alfred Neuland competed in the 1920 and 1924 Olympics and won a gold and a silver medal, respectively, becoming the first Olympic gold medalist from Estonia. Alfred Schmidt was a featherweight weightlifter who won a silver medal at the 1920 Summer Olympics. Arnold Luhaäär competed in the 1928 and 1936 Olympics and won a silver and a bronze medal, respectively. Jaan Talts won a silver medal in weightlifting for the Soviet Union at the 1968 Olympic games and a gold medal at the 1972 Olympic games.

- Other notable weightlifters in Estonia: Jaan Kikkas, Harald Tammer and Mart Seim.

== Wrestling ==
Wrestling was the most successful and also very popular Olympic event for Estonia between 1920 and 1936. In 2006, Heiki Nabi became the first amateur wrestling World Champion for Estonia. At the 2012 Summer Olympics, Nabi won the silver medal in the Men's Greco-Roman 120 kg. Nabi continued his great career winning second gold medal at 2013 World Championships and bronze medal at 2014 World Championships.

- Notable wrestlers in Estonia: Aleksander Aberg, Georg Baumann, Georg Hackenschmidt, Georg Lurich, Oskar Kaplur, Osvald Käpp, Martin Klein, Anton Koolmann, Johannes Kotkas, Jaan Jaago, Albert Kusnets, August Neo, Eduard Pütsep, Voldemar Väli and female wrestler Epp Mäe.
- Kristjan Palusalu is one of the most well-known athletes in Estonia even though he competed 80 years ago in the 1936 Summer Olympics.

== Other sports ==
- Sumo wrestling hasn't been popular in Estonia, but Baruto found real success in this sport.
- Margus Hunt is an Estonian American football defensive end, playing in the National Football League (NFL). He was junior world champion in shot put and discus throw, having never played football before starting university in the US.
- Andrus Murumets is an Estonian strongman. He won Strongman Champions League in 2009.
- Kiiking, a relatively new sport, was invented in 1996 by Ado Kosk in Estonia. Kiiking involves a modified swing in which the rider of the swing tries to go around 360 degrees.
- Estonia has also won many medals in ice yachting competitions.
- Estonian sportsmen have also won several medals at inshore powerboat racing championships.
- Robin Kool, also known as ropz, is a professional Counter-Strike 2 player. He joined Mousesports at the age of 17 and currently plays for Team Vitality. He has won 3 Majors and 3 ESL Grand Slams.

== International championships hosted by Estonia ==
Year	Championship	Venue(es)
1980	Summer Olympics Sailing Regatta	Tallinn
2012	UEFA European Under-19 Championship	Tallinn, Haapsalu, Rakvere
2013	FIBA Europe Under-20 Championship	Tallinn
2018	Biathlon Junior World Championships	Otepää
2018	UEFA Super Cup	Tallinn
2021	European Volleyball Championship	Tallinn (co-host)
2023	UEFA Women's Under-17 Championship	Tallinn
2023	Women's European Volleyball Championship	Tallinn (co-host)

== Gallery ==
Gallery of famous Estonian sportspeople

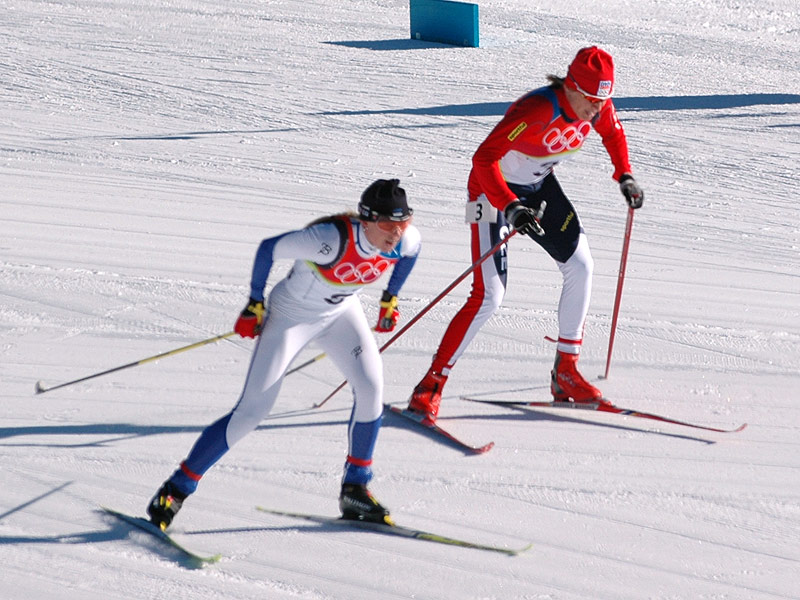
Kristina Šmigun-Vähi

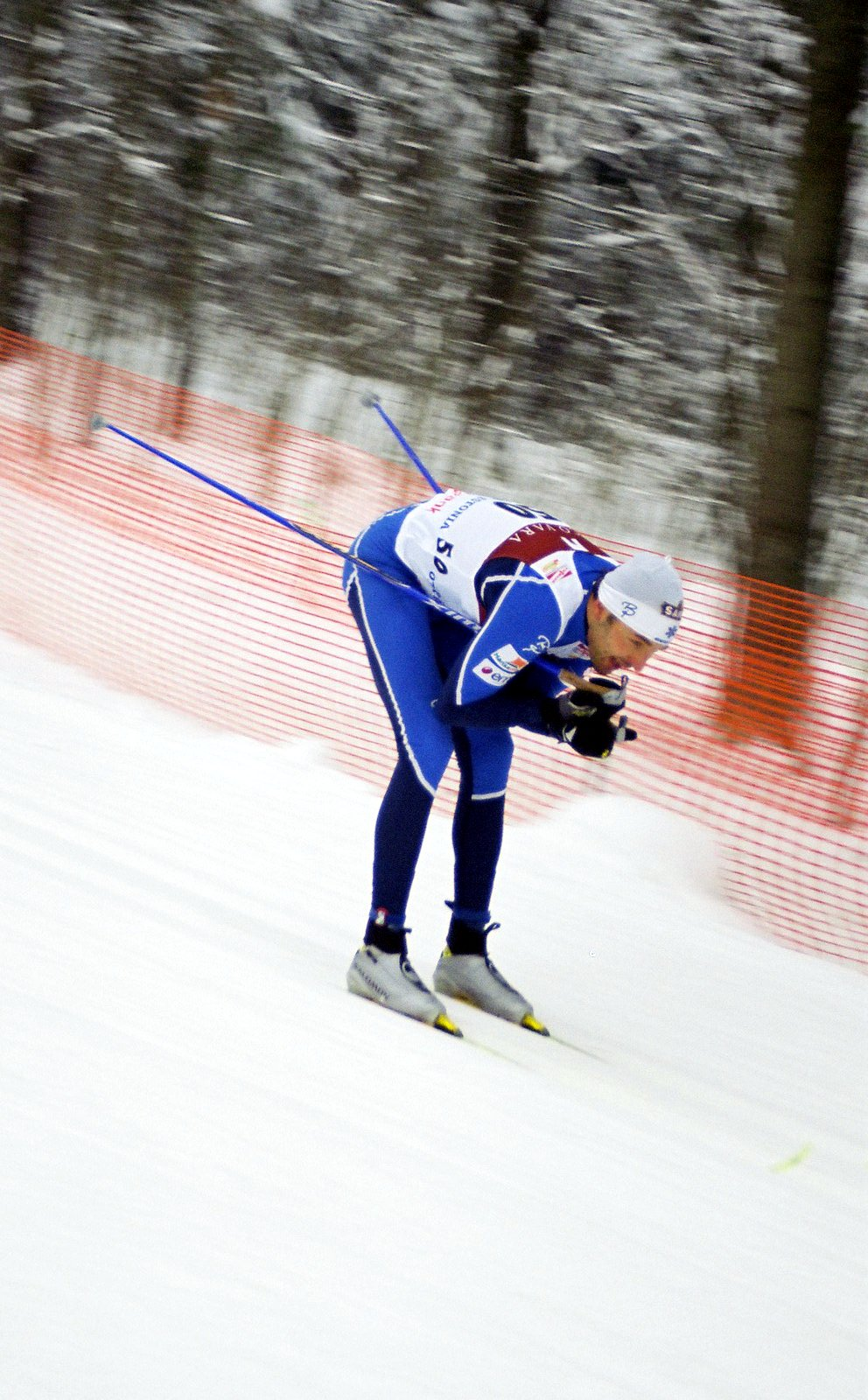
Andrus Veerpalu

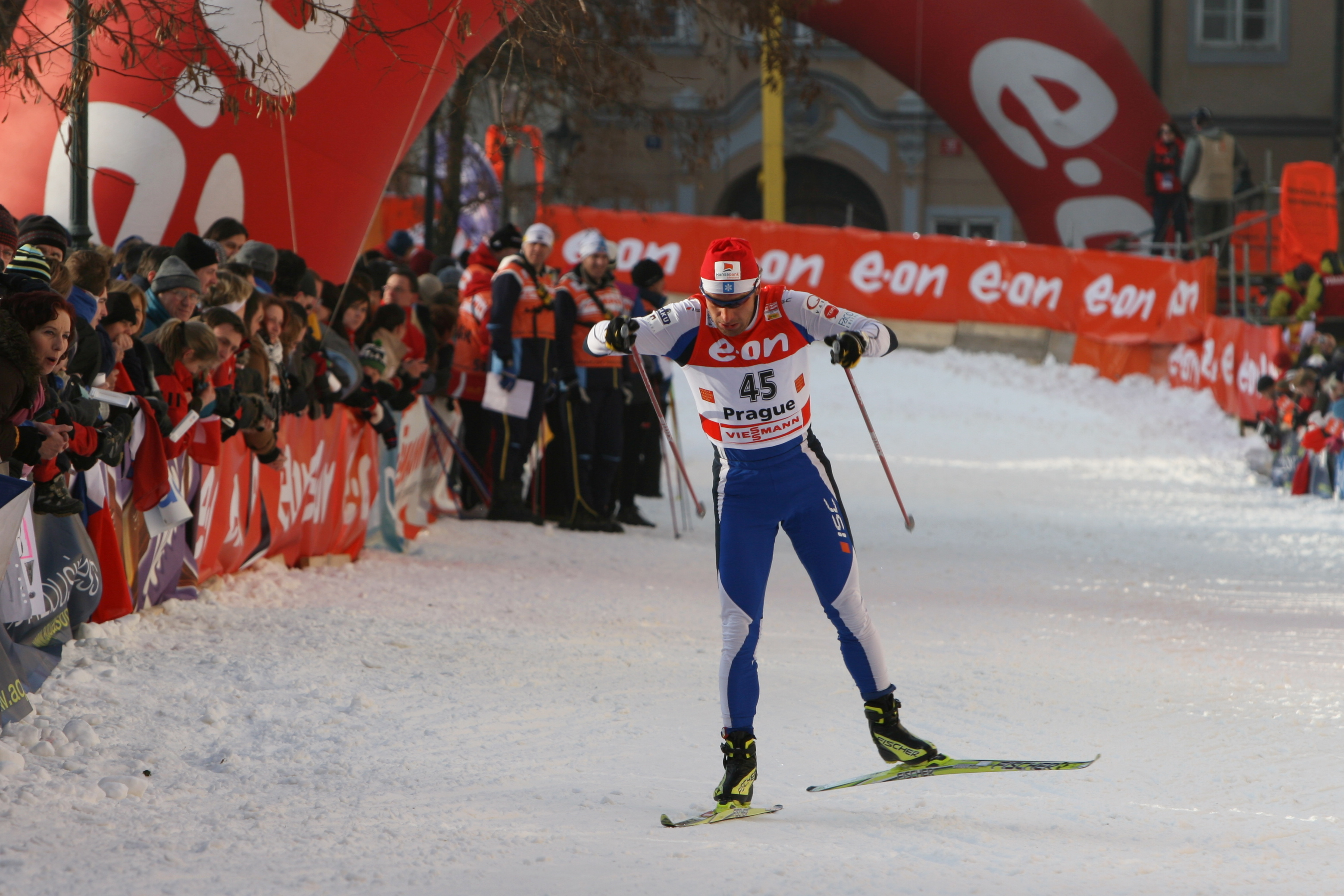
Jaak Mae

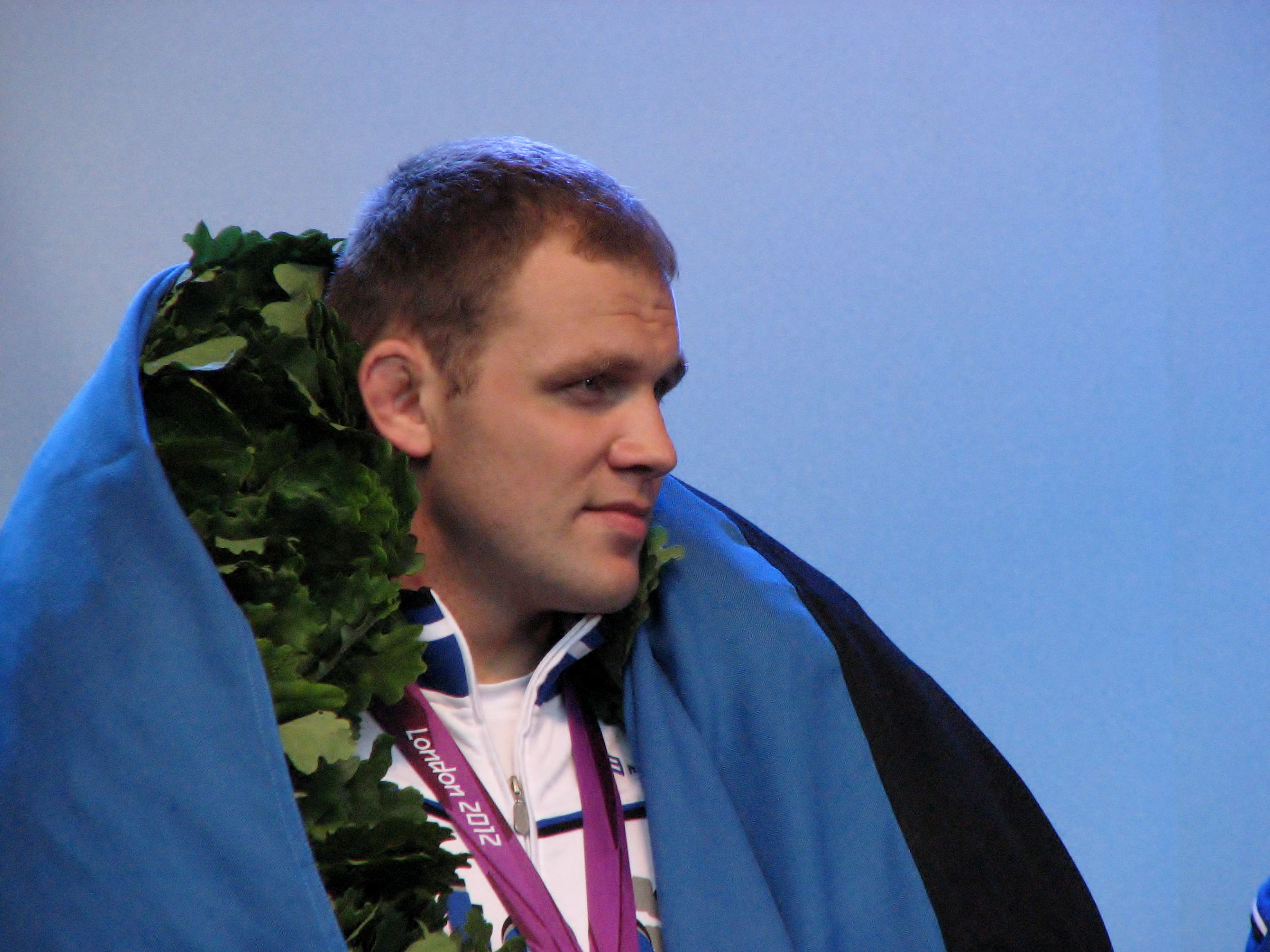
Heiki Nabi

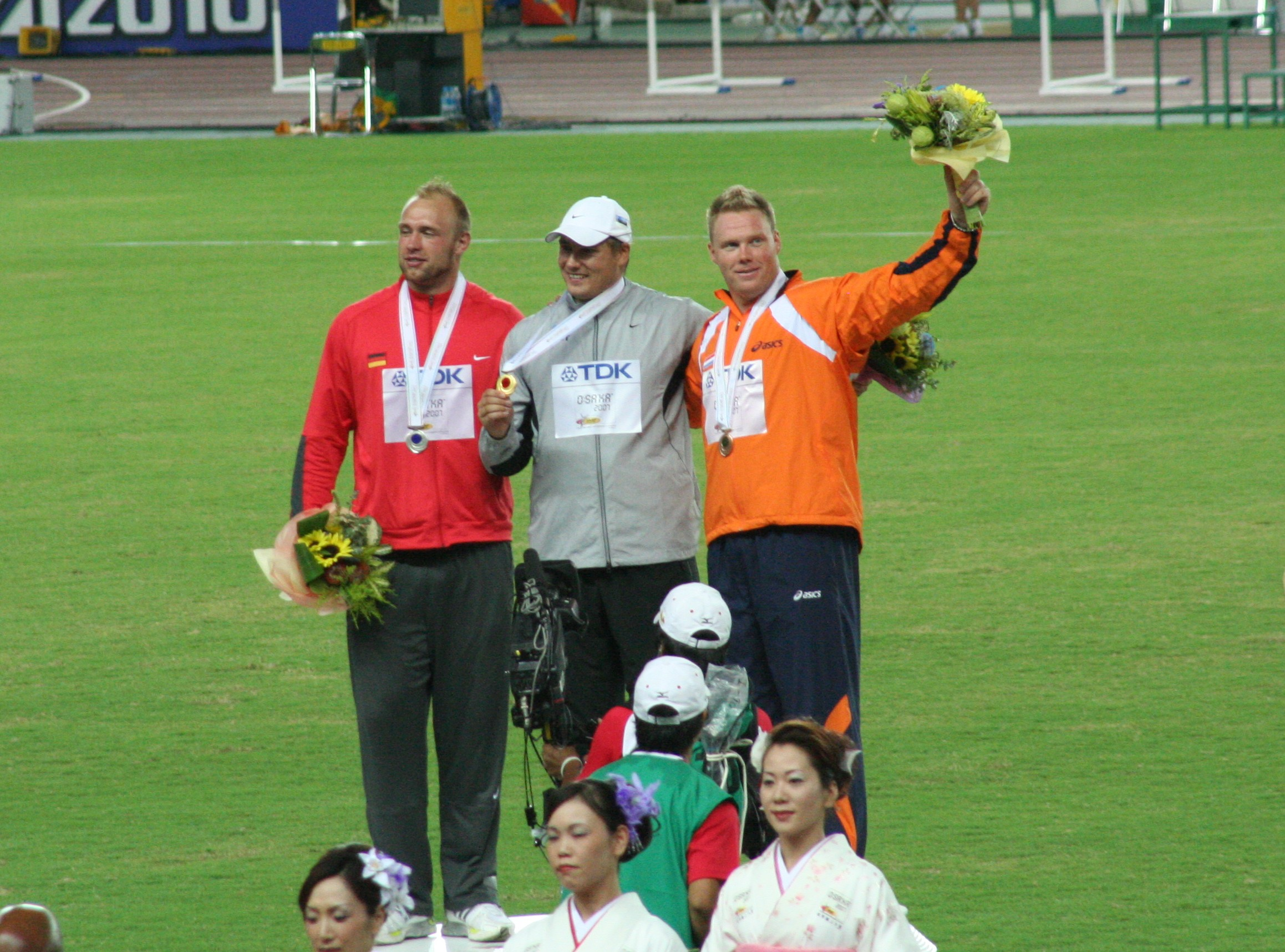
Gerd Kanter

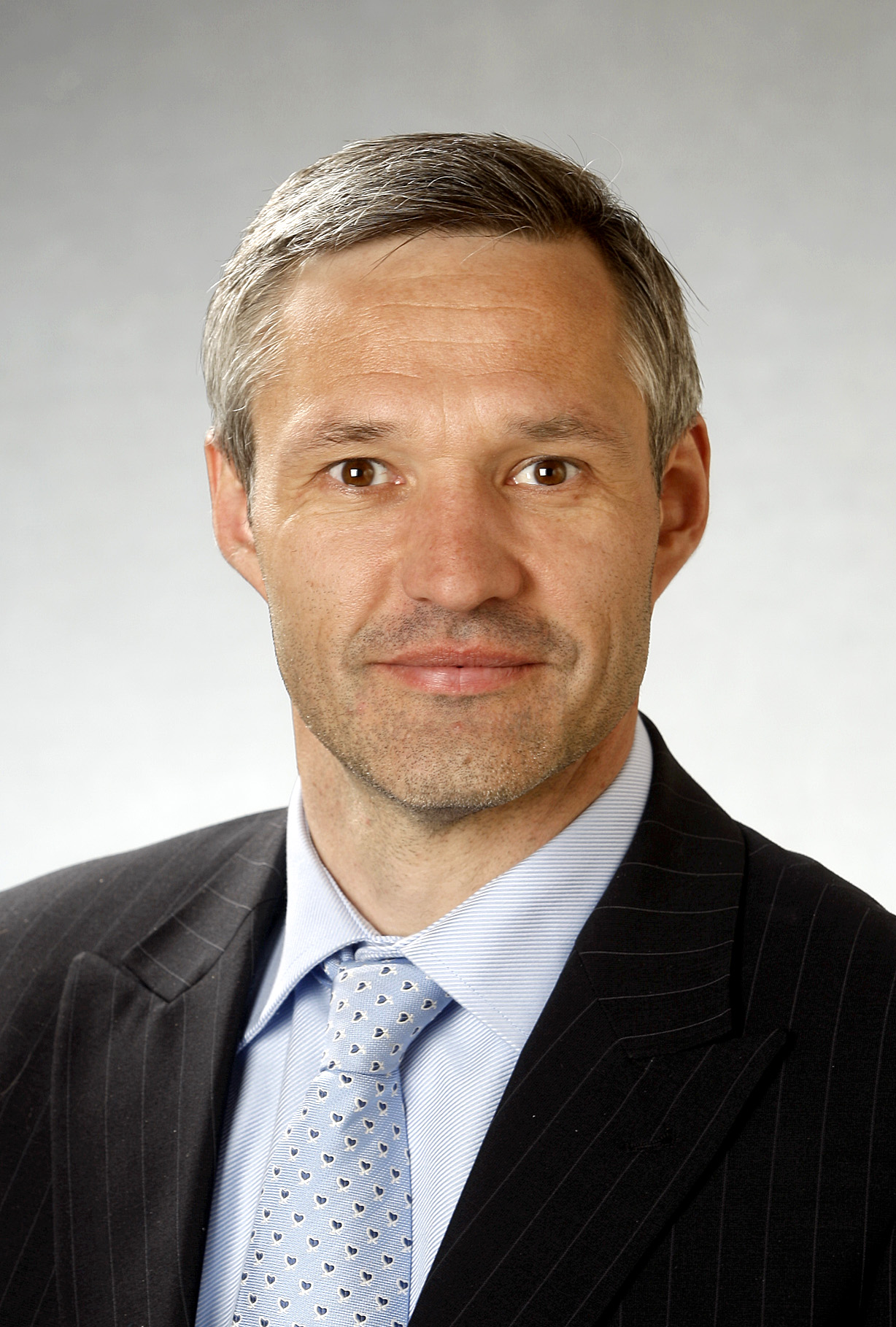
Erki Nool

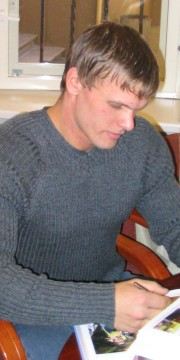
Andrus Värnik

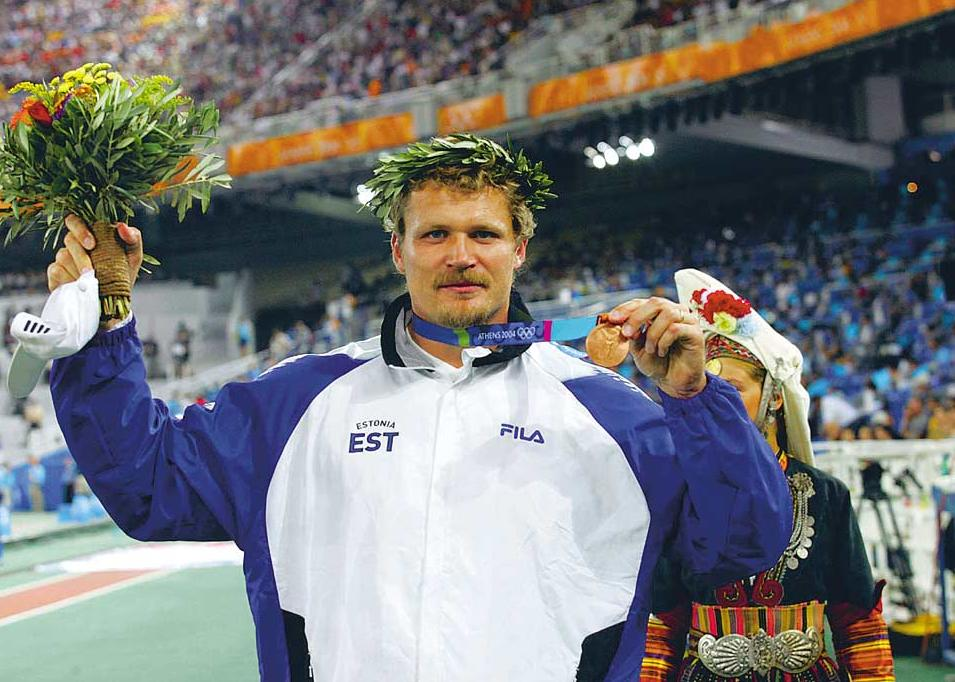
Aleksander Tammert

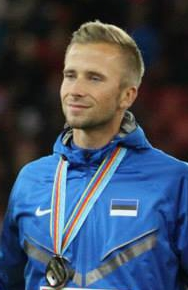
Rasmus Mägi

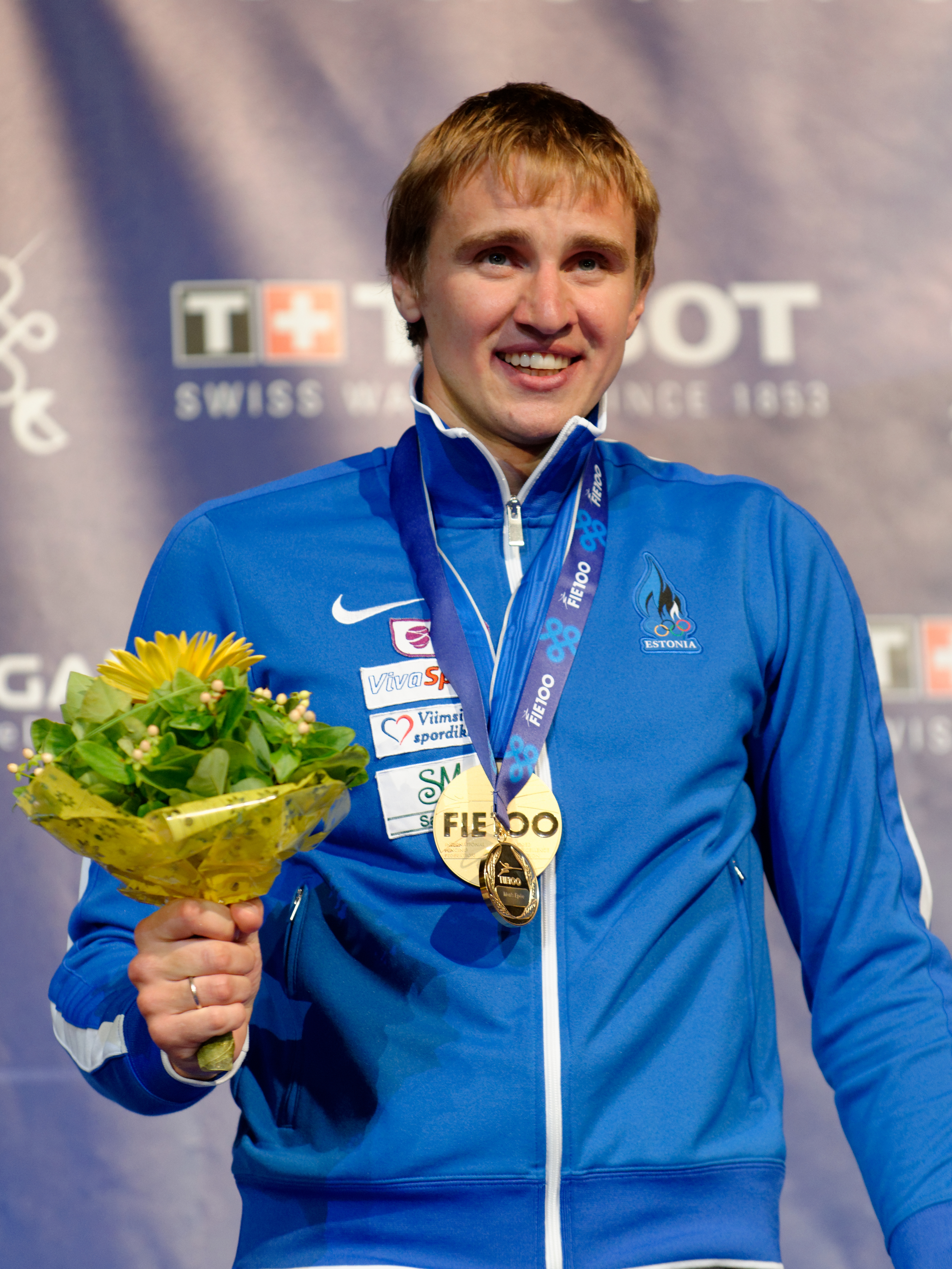
Nikolai Novosjolov

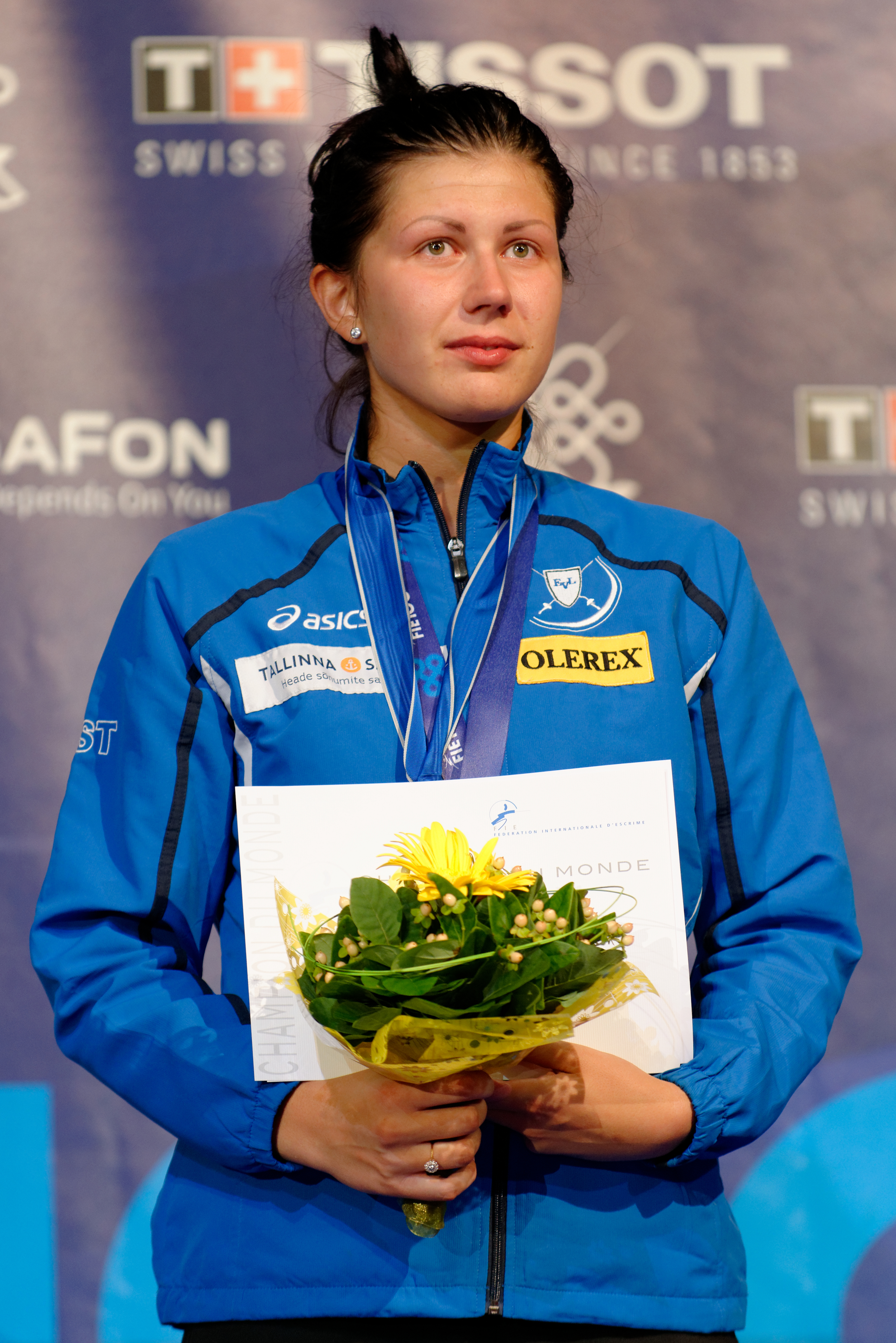
Julia Beljajeva

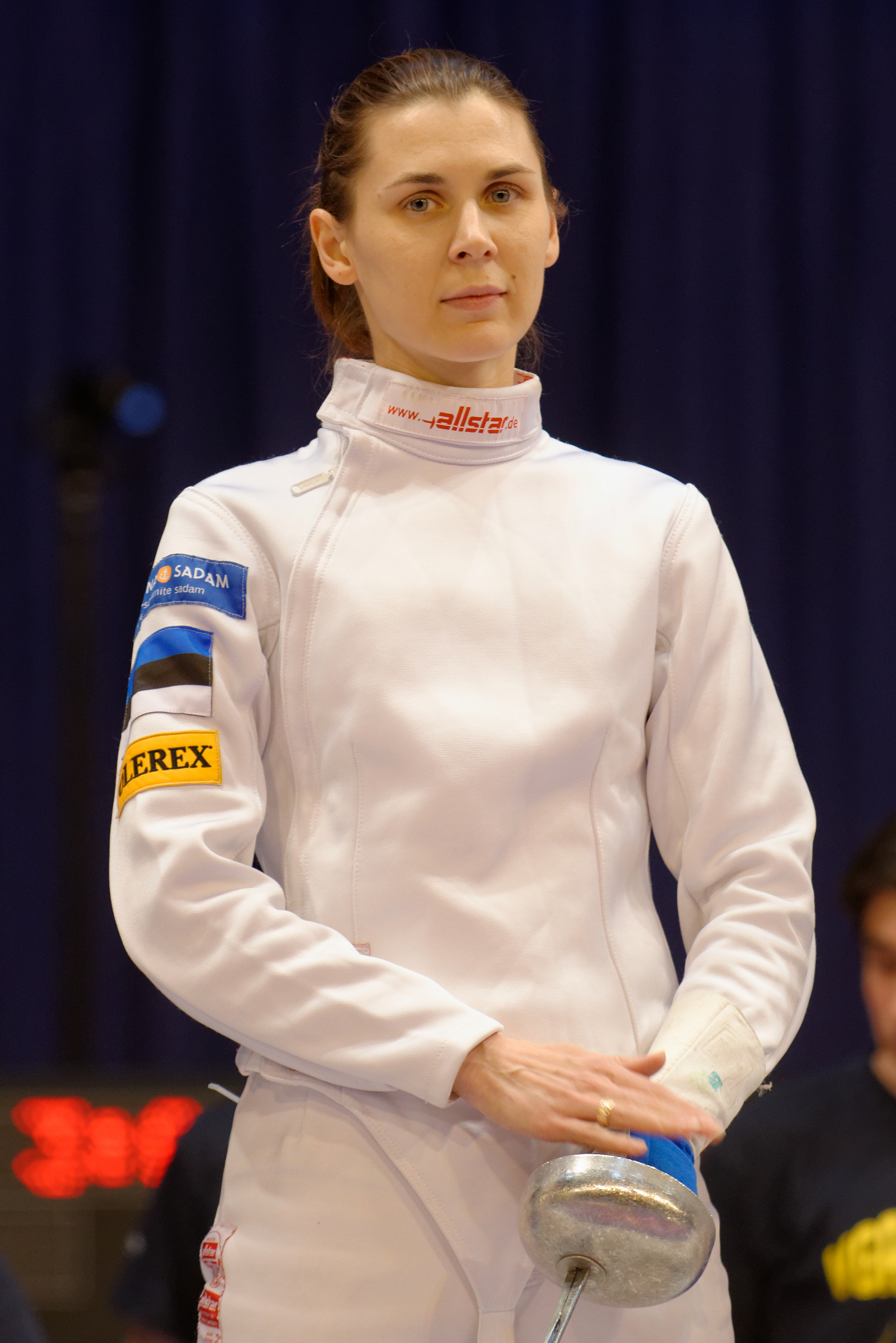
Irina Embrich

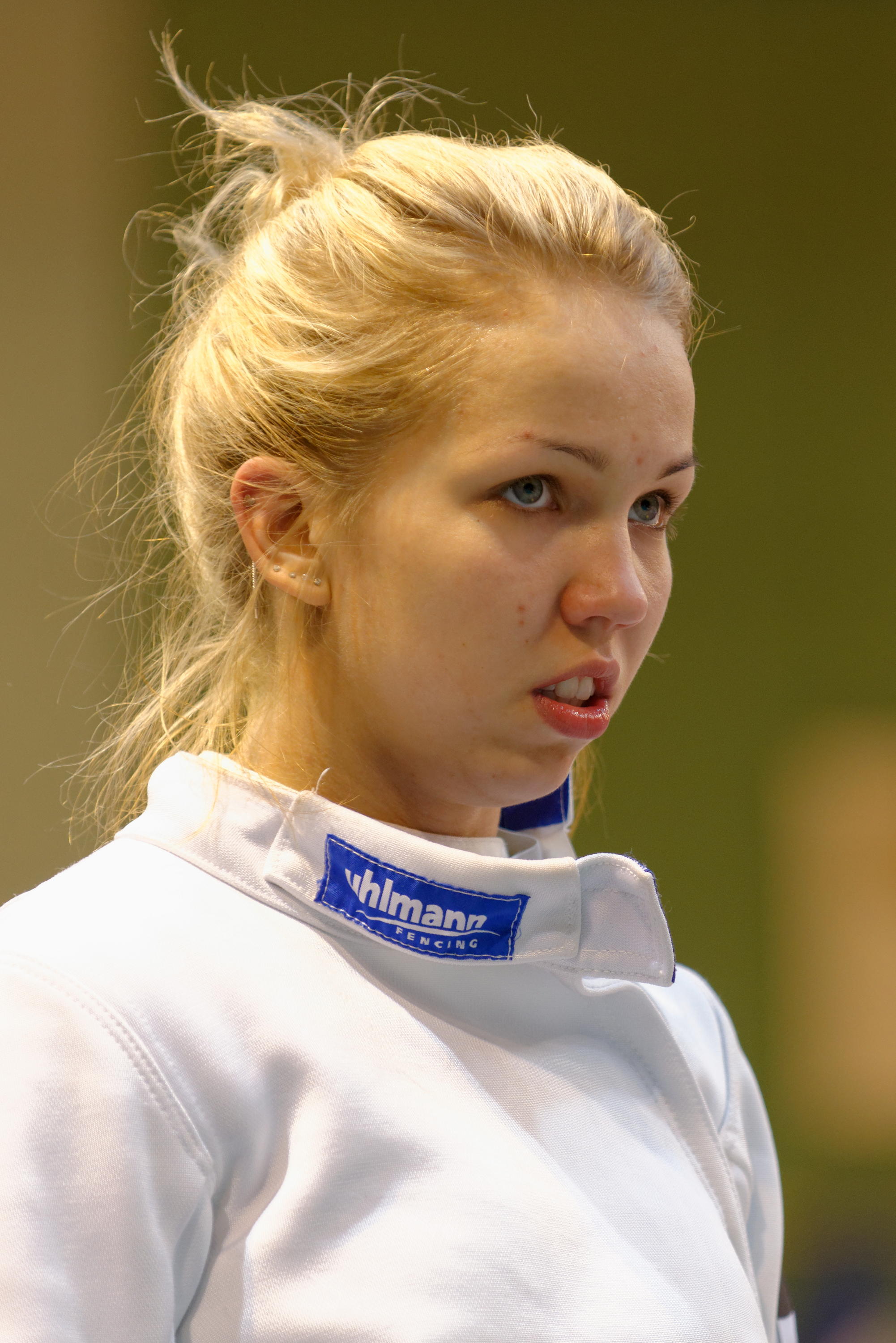
Erika Kirpu

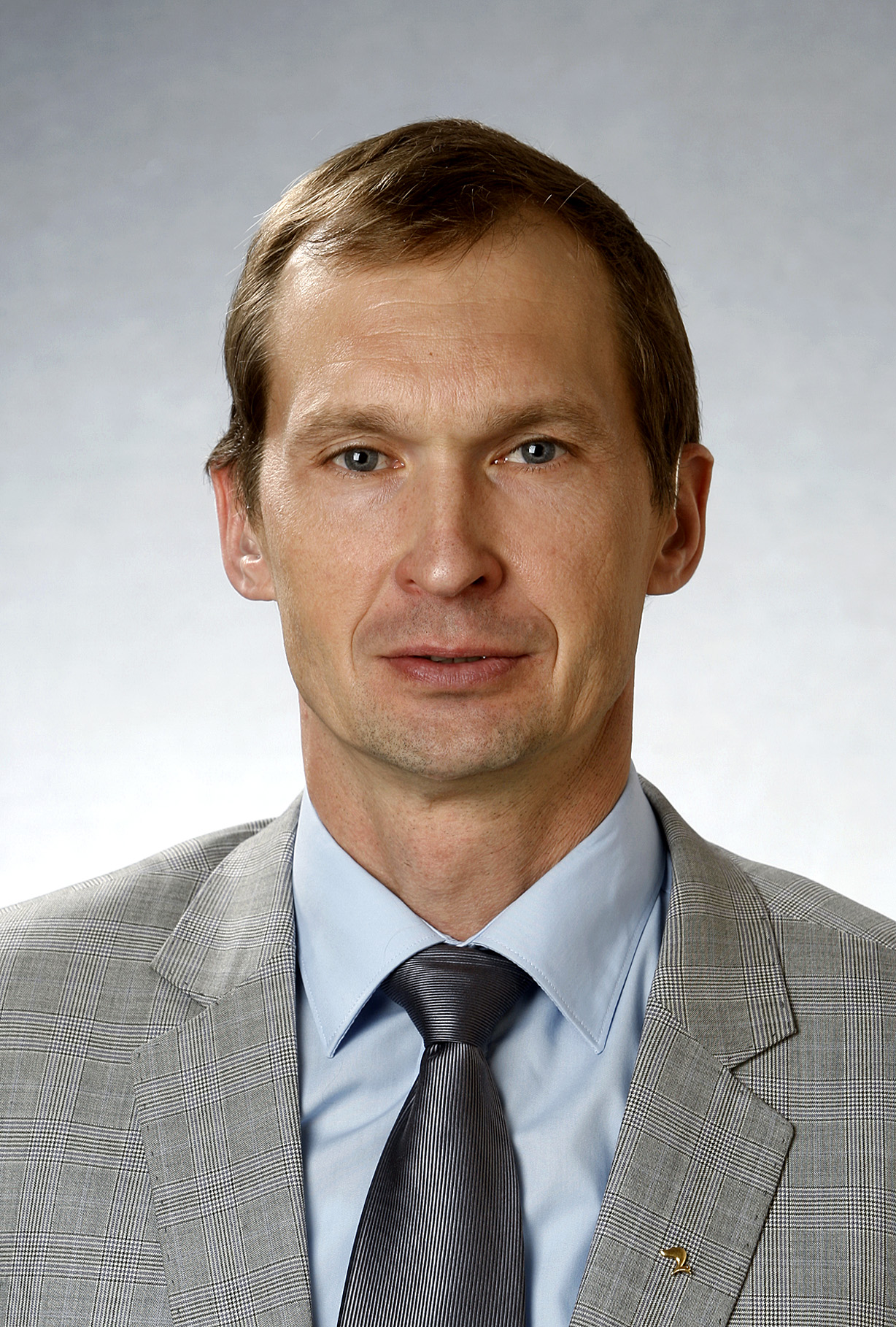
Jüri Jaanson

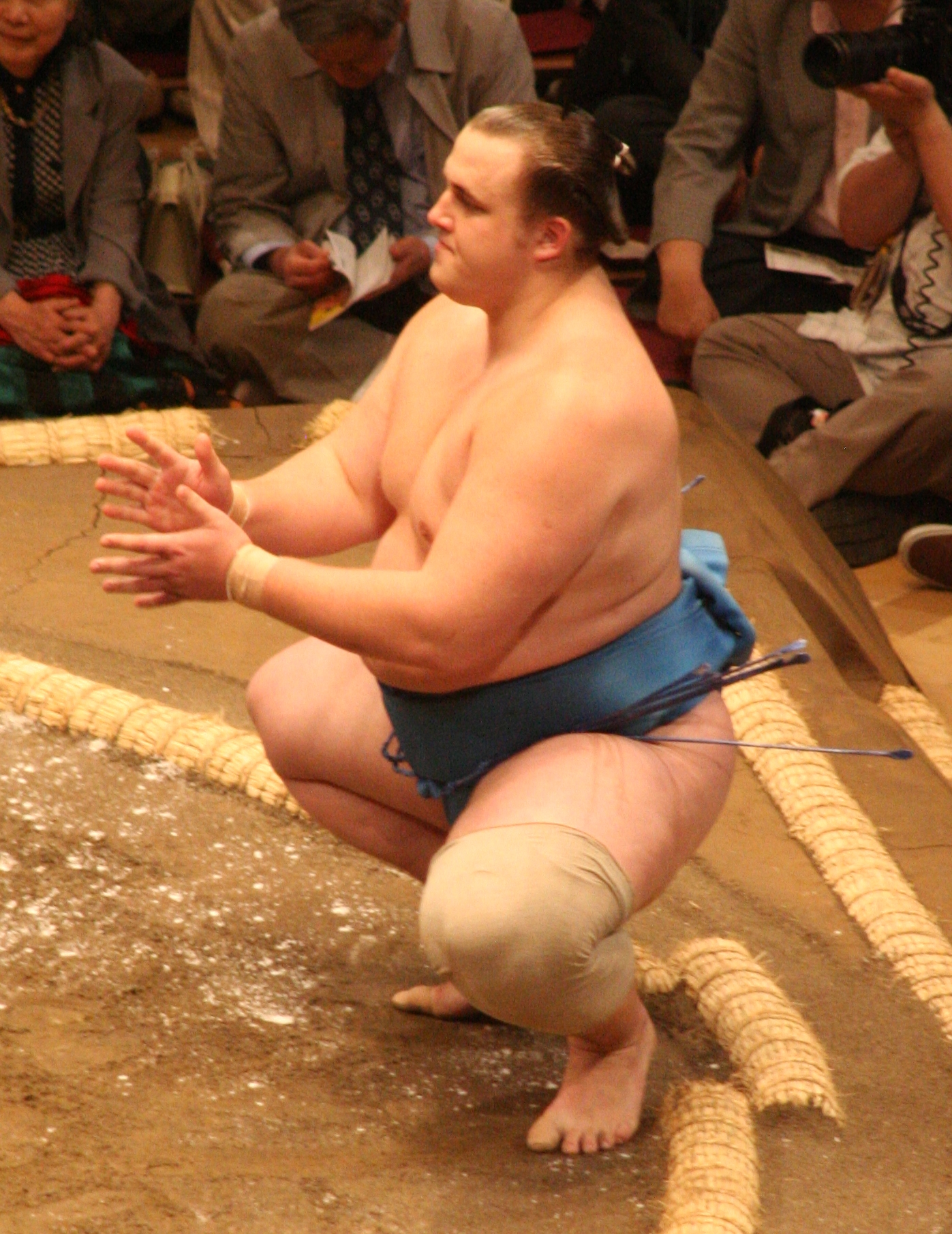
Baruto Kaito

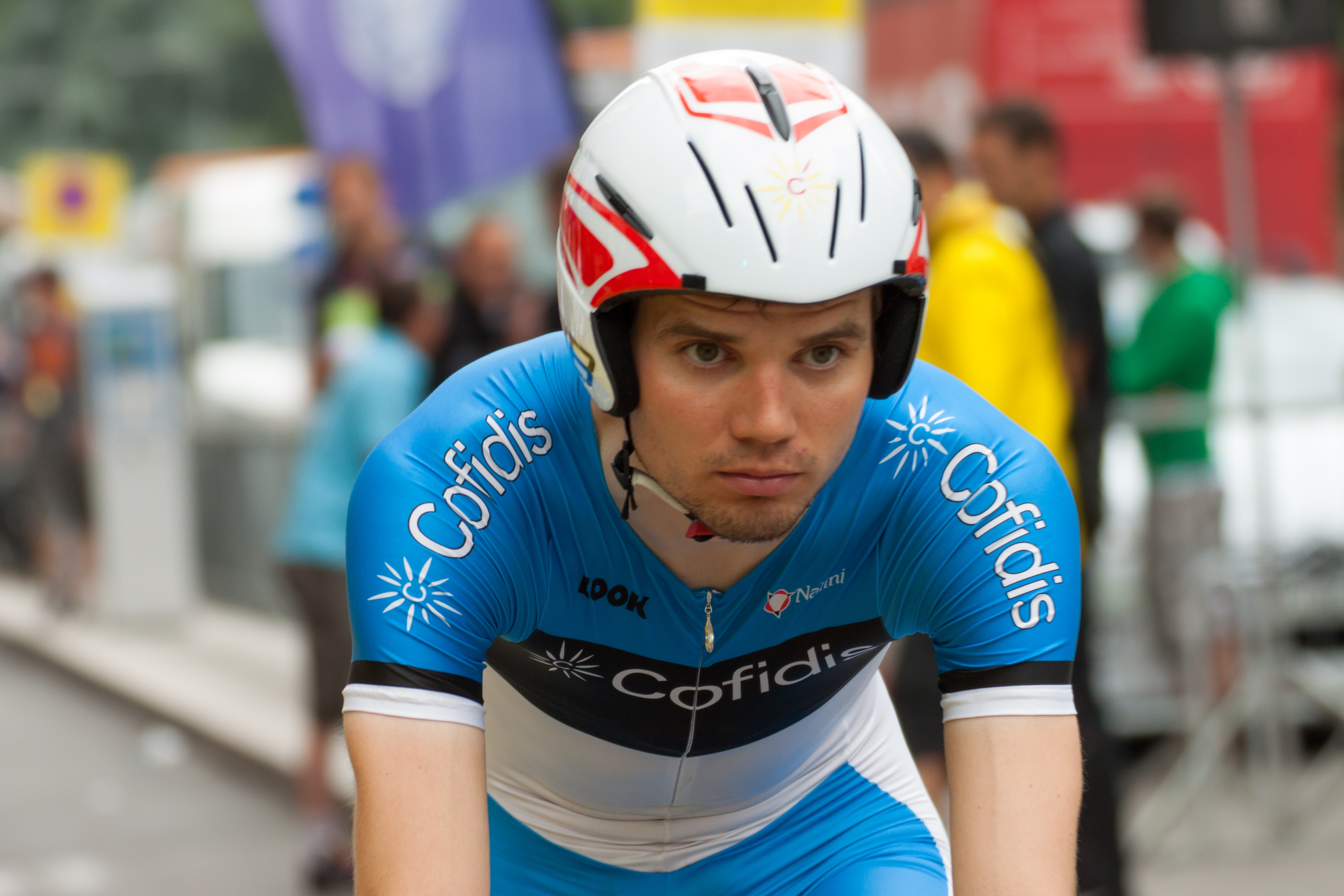
Rein Taaramäe

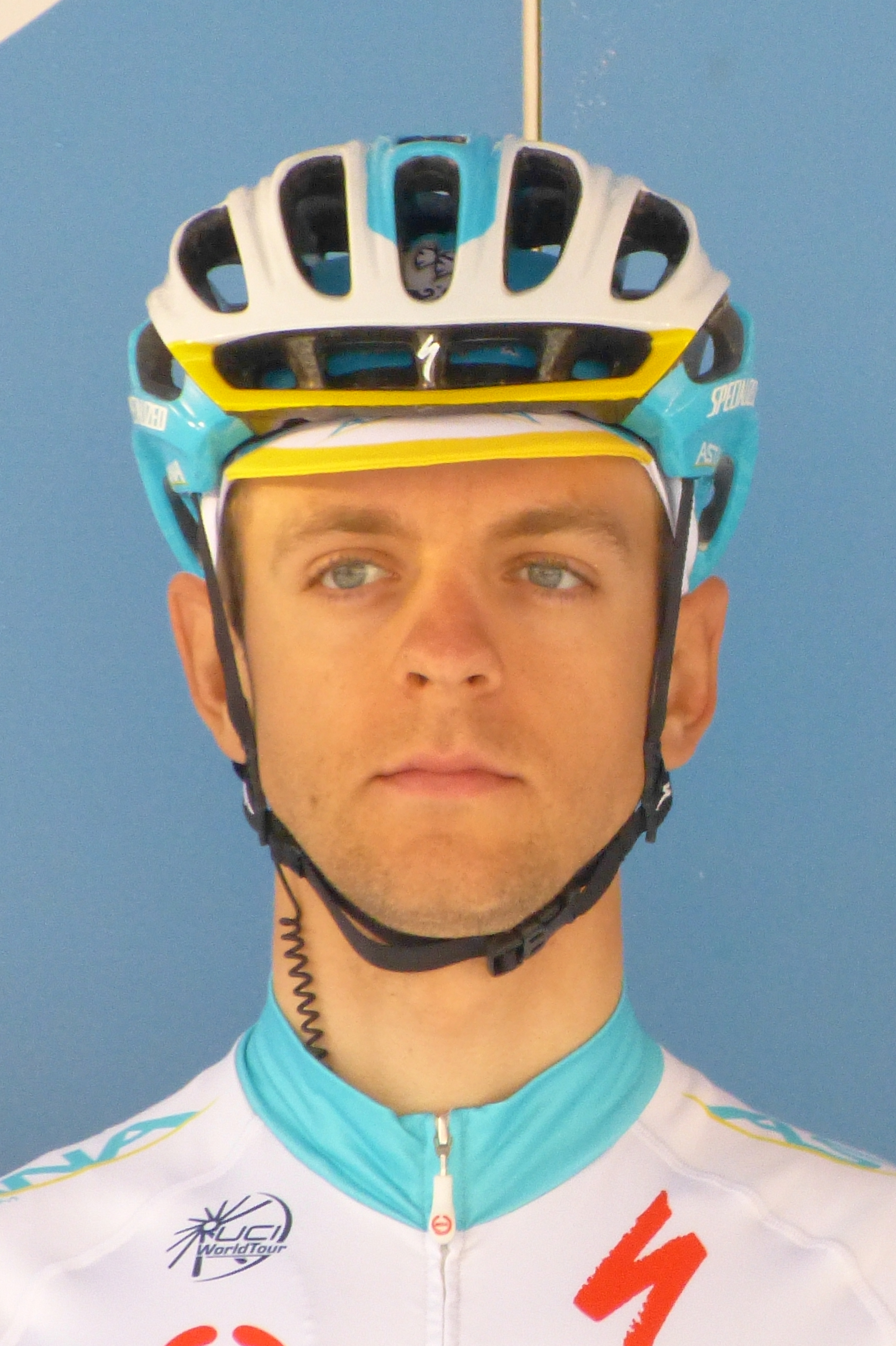
Tanel Kangert

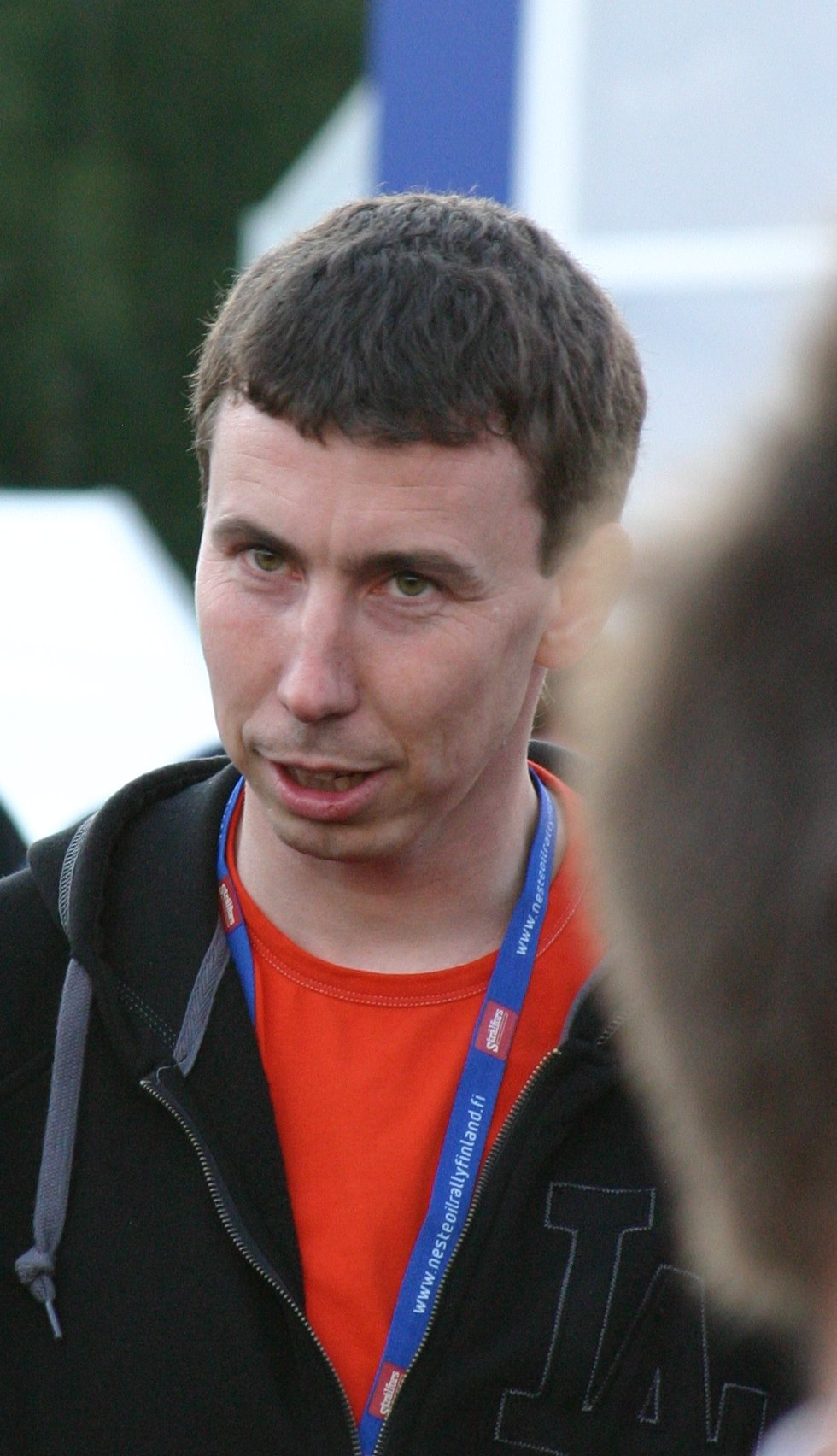
Markko Märtin

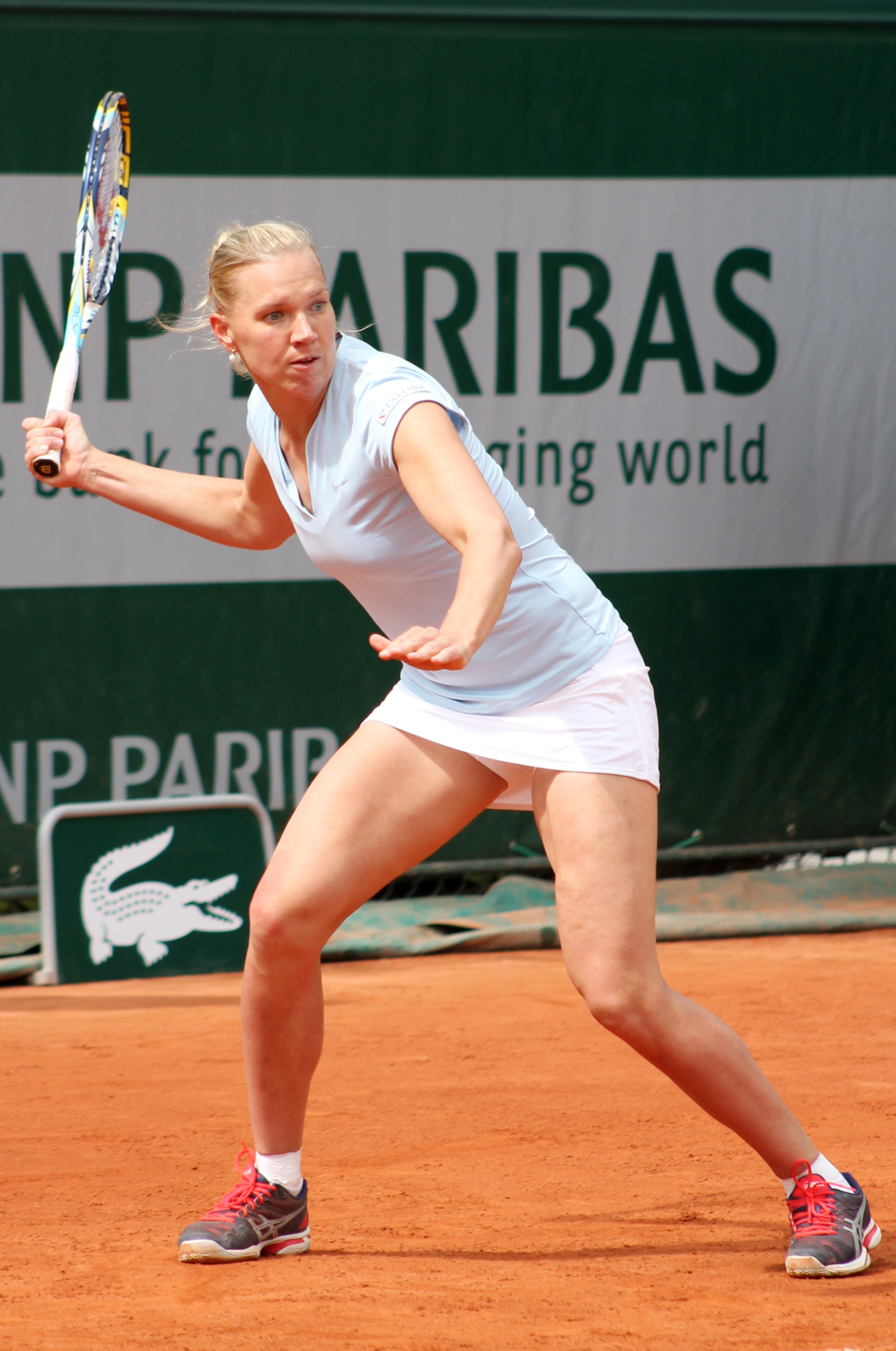
Kaia Kanepi

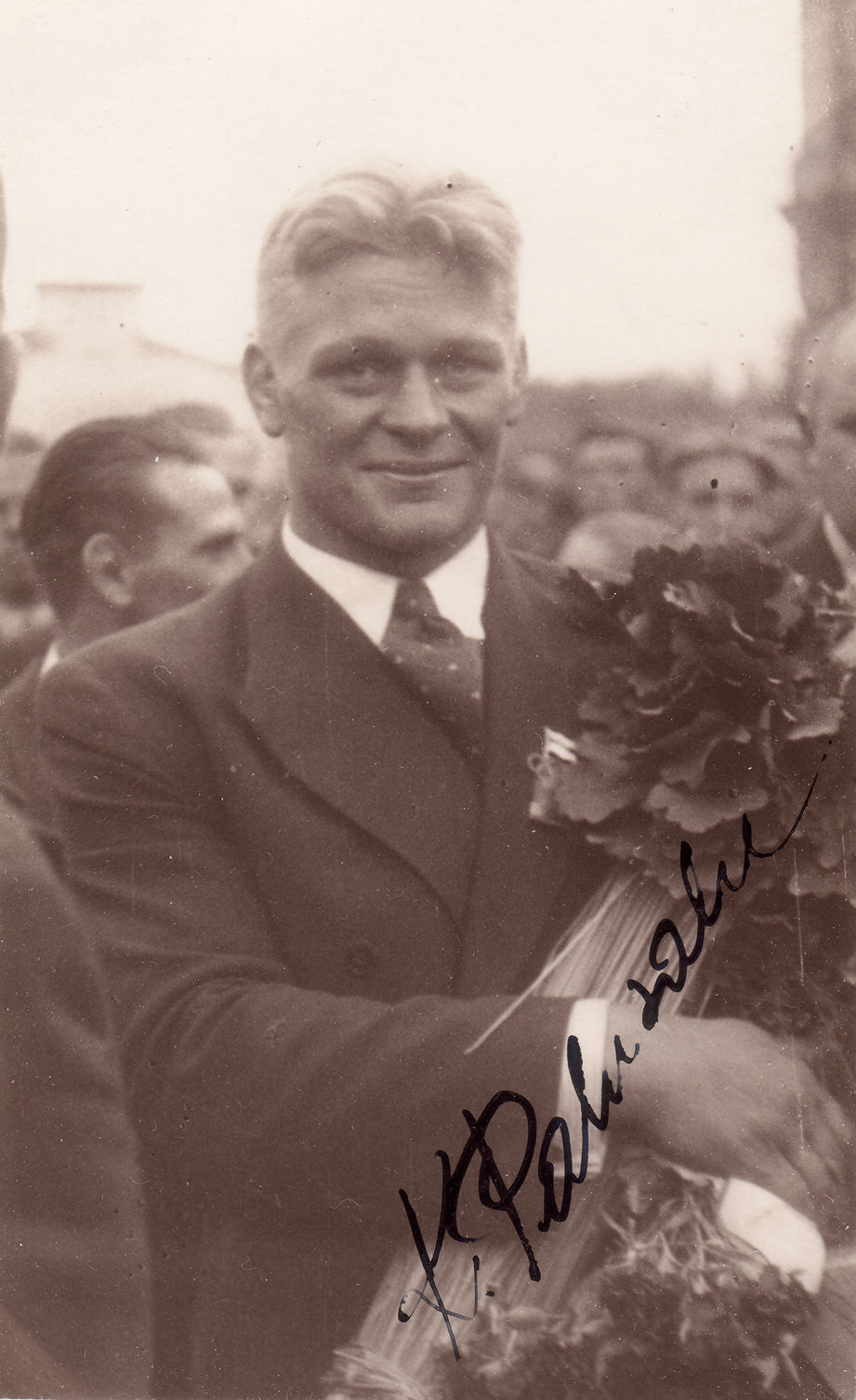
Kristjan Palusalu

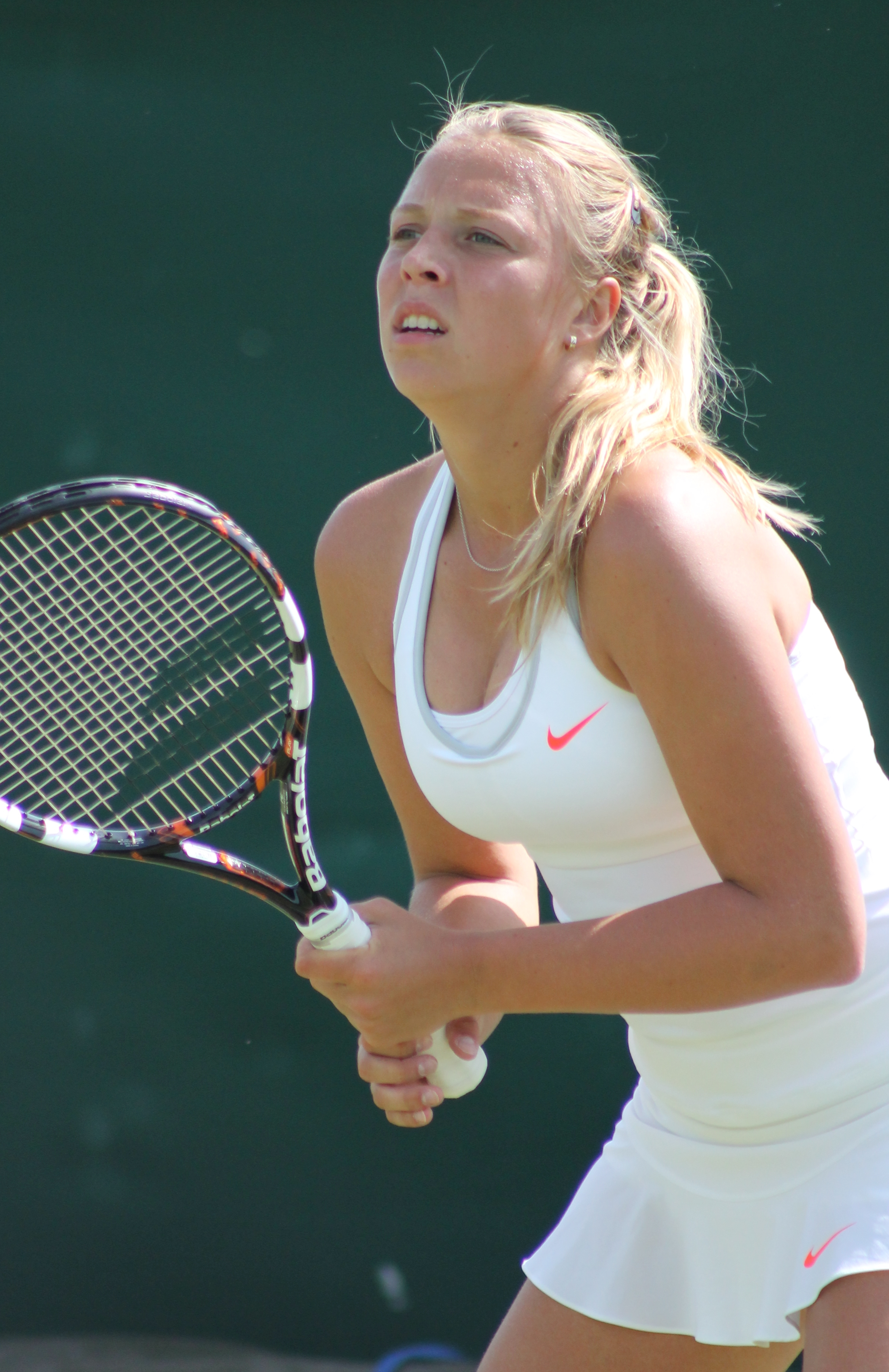
Anett Kontaveit

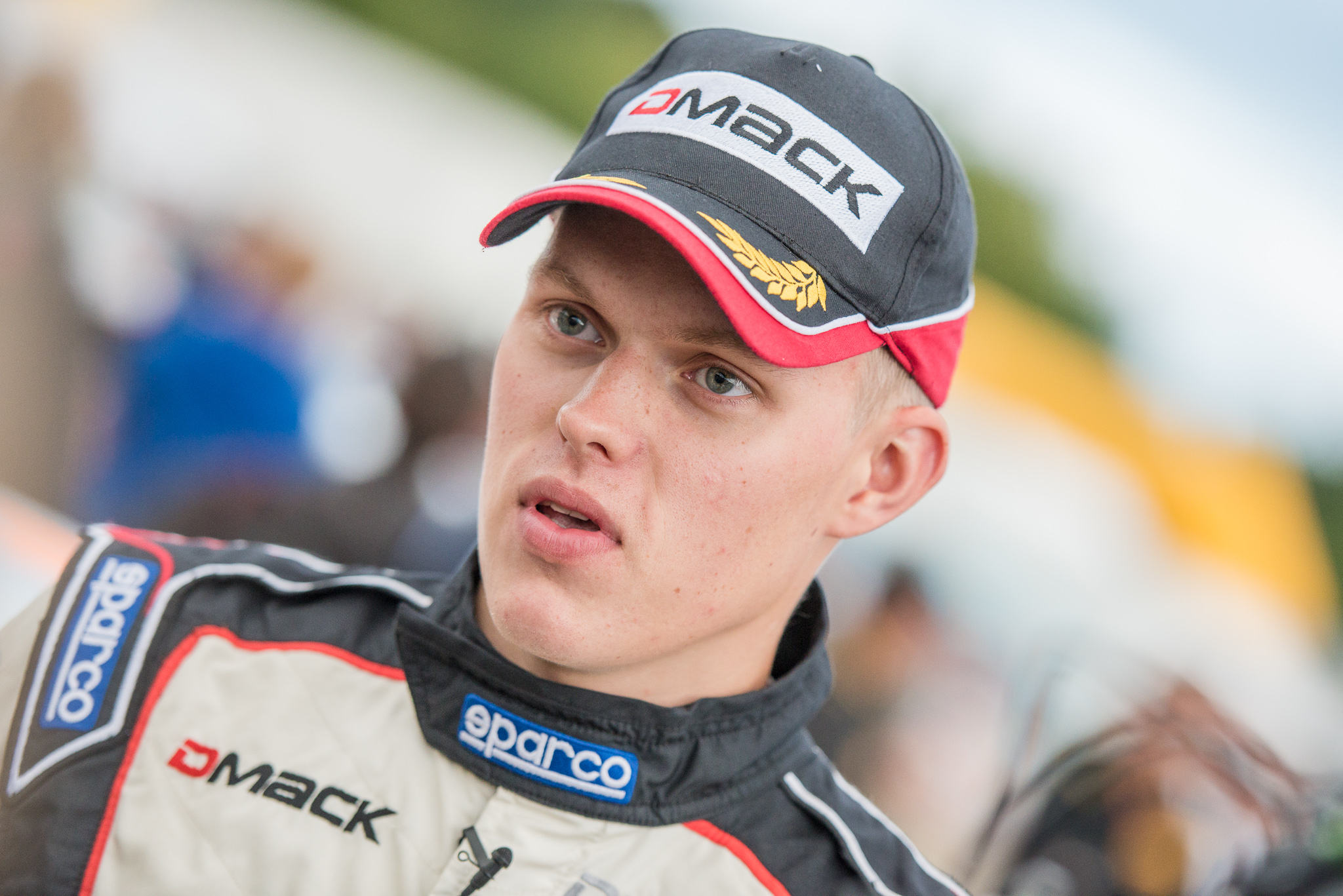
Ott Tänak

== See also ==
- Estonia at the Olympics
- Estonia national bandy team
- Rugby union in Estonia
- List of Estonian sportspeople
- Category:National sports teams of Estonia
