= 2017 European Wrestling Championships – Men's Greco-Roman 130 kg =

Wrestling competition

The Men's Greco-Roman 130 kg is a competition featured at the 2017 European Wrestling Championships, and was held in Novi Sad, Serbia on May 6.

== Medalists ==
| Gold | Rıza Kayaalp; Turkey |
| Silver | Bálint Lám; Hungary |
| Bronze | Levan Arabuli; Georgia |
| Bronze | Vitaly Shchur; Russia |

== Results ==
Legend

- F — Won by fall

=== Final ===
| Final |
| Rıza Kayaalp (TUR) | 4 |
| Bálint Lám (HUN) | 3 |

=== Top half ===
==== Section 1 ====
Round of 32

Round of 16
Rıza Kayaalp (TUR) | 8
Tamas Soos (SVK) | 0
Oskar Marvik (NOR) | 0
Levan Arabuli (GEO) | 9
Heiki Nabi (EST) | 1
Christian John (GER) | 4
Tuomas Lahti (FIN) | 1
Nemanja Pavlović (SRB) | 6

Quarterfinals
Rıza Kayaalp (TUR) | 3
Levan Arabuli (GEO) | 1
Christian John (GER) | 7
Nemanja Pavlović (SRB) | 2

Semifinals
Rıza Kayaalp (TUR) | 7^{F}
Christian John (GER) | 0

=== Bottom half ===
Round of 32
Oleksandr Chernetskyy (UKR) | 8
Oyan Nazariani (AZE) | 0
Mantas Knystautas (LTU) | 2
Ioseb Chugoshvili (BLR) | 2

Round of 16
Nikolaos Leon (GRE) | 2
Vachik Yeghiazaryan (ARM) | 10
Vitaly Shchur (RUS) | 3
Bálint Lám (HUN) | 4
Alin Alexuc-Ciurariu (ROU) | 3
Miroslav Metodiev (BUL) | 1
Oleksandr Chernetskyy (UKR) | 5
Mantas Knystautas (LTU) | 0

Quarterfinals
Vachik Yeghiazaryan (ARM) | 0
Bálint Lám (HUN) | 4
Alin Alexuc-Ciurariu (ROU) | 2
Oleksandr Chernetskyy (UKR) | 1

Semifinals
Bálint Lám (HUN) | 4
Alin Alexuc-Ciurariu (ROU) | 1

=== Repechage ===
Repechage round 1
Tamas Soos (SVK) | 0
Levan Arabuli (GEO) | 8
Vachik Yeghiazaryan (ARM) | 0
Vitaly Shchur (RUS) | 4

Bronze medal match
Christian John (GER) | 0
Levan Arabuli (GEO) | 8
Alin Alexuc-Ciurariu (ROU) | 3
Vitaly Shchur (RUS) | 5
