= Arabuli =

Arabuli (Georgian: არაბული) is a Georgian surname. Notable people with the surname include:

- Bachana Arabuli (born 1994), Georgian footballer
- Levan Arabuli (born 1992), Georgian Greco-Roman wrestler
