= 2017 Grand Prix Zagreb Open =

- Host city: Zagreb, Croatia
- Dates: 11–12 March 2017
- Stadium: Dom Sportova

The 2017 Grand Prix Zagreb Open, was a wrestling event held in Zagreb, Croatia between 11–12 March 2017.

== Medal table ==
| Rank | Nation | Gold | Silver | Bronze | Total |
|---|---|---|---|---|---|
| 1 | Croatia | 2 | 0 | 3 | 5 |
| 2 | Hungary | 2 | 0 | 1 | 3 |
| 3 | Serbia | 1 | 2 | 1 | 4 |
| 4 | Japan | 1 | 2 | 0 | 3 |
| 5 | Romania | 1 | 1 | 2 | 4 |
| 6 | United States | 1 | 0 | 4 | 5 |
| 7 | Russia | 0 | 1 | 3 | 4 |
| 8 | Austria | 0 | 1 | 1 | 2 |
| 8 | Poland | 0 | 1 | 1 | 2 |
| Totals (9 entries) | | 8 | 8 | 16 | 32 |

== Team ranking ==
| Rank | Men's Greco-Roman | |
| Rank | Team | Points |
|---|---|---|
| 1 | Croatia | 78 |
| 2 | United States | 75 |
| 3 | Serbia | 66 |
| 4 | Russia | 44 |
| 5 | Japan | 43 |
| 6 | Hungary | 36 |
| 7 | Romania | 36 |
| 8 | Austria | 23 |
| 9 | Poland | 19 |
| 10 | South Korea | 10 |

== Greco-Roman ==
| Event | Gold | Silver | Bronze |
|---|---|---|---|
| 59 kg | Masuto Kawana; Japan | Dawid Ersetic; Poland | Ivan Lizatović; Croatia |
| 59 kg | Masuto Kawana; Japan | Dawid Ersetic; Poland | Zaur Khusnutdinov; Russia |
| 66 kg | Alejandro Sancho; United States | Mihai Mihuț; Romania | Mateusz Nowak; Poland |
| 66 kg | Alejandro Sancho; United States | Mihai Mihuț; Romania | Mate Nemeš; Serbia |
| 71 kg | Dominik Etlinger; Croatia | Takeshi Izumi; Japan | Ravaughn Perkins; United States |
| 71 kg | Dominik Etlinger; Croatia | Takeshi Izumi; Japan | Ilie Cojocari; Romania |
| 75 kg | George Marie; Romania | Soh Sakabe; Japan | Jessie Porter; United States |
| 75 kg | George Marie; Romania | Soh Sakabe; Japan | Antonio Kamenjašević; Croatia |
| 80 kg | Božo Starčević; Croatia | Viktor Nemeš; Serbia | Kamal Bey; United States |
| 80 kg | Božo Starčević; Croatia | Viktor Nemeš; Serbia | Alan Khugayev; Russia |
| 85 kg | Viktor Lőrincz; Hungary | Nikolay Dobrev; Serbia | Lukas Staudacher; Austria |
| 85 kg | Viktor Lőrincz; Hungary | Nikolay Dobrev; Serbia | Ivan Huklek; Croatia |
| 98 kg | Mikheil Kajaia; Serbia | Daniel Gastl; Austria | Ilia Borisov; Russia |
| 98 kg | Mikheil Kajaia; Serbia | Daniel Gastl; Austria | Ivan Nemeth; Hungary |
| 130 kg | Bálint Lám; Hungary | Vasily Parshin; Russia | Richard Erickson; United States |
| 130 kg | Bálint Lám; Hungary | Vasily Parshin; Russia | Alin Alexuc-Ciurariu; Romania |

== Participating nations ==
91 competitors from 15 nations participated.

- Argentina (2)
- Austria (3)
- Bulgaria (1)
- Croatia (14)
- Czech Republic (5)
- Germany (1)
- Hungary (6)
- Israel (1)
- Japan (9)
- Poland (6)
- Romania (5)
- Russia (8)
- Serbia (14)
- South Korea (3)
- United States (13)
