= 2013 World Wrestling Championships – Men's Greco-Roman 120 kg =

Men's Greco-Roman 120 kg at the 2013 World Championships
- Venue: László Papp Budapest Sports Arena
- Dates: 22 September 2013
- Competitors: 27 from 27 nations

Medalists
gold medal	Heiki Nabi	Estonia
silver medal	Rıza Kayaalp	Turkey
bronze medal	Nurmakhan Tinaliyev	Kazakhstan
bronze medal	Johan Eurén	Sweden

The men's Greco-Roman 120 kilograms is a competition featured at the 2013 World Wrestling Championships, and was held at the László Papp Budapest Sports Arena in Budapest, Hungary on 22 September 2013.

This Greco-Roman wrestling competition consists of a single-elimination tournament, with a repechage used to determine the winner of two bronze medals.

== Results ==
Legend

- C — Won by 3 cautions given to the opponent
- F — Won by fall

=== Final ===
Final
Heiki Nabi (EST)	0
Amir Aliakbari (IRI)	4

=== Top half ===
Round of 32
Heiki Nabi (EST)	7
Kamil Błoński (POL)	0
Radhouane Chebbi (TUN)	2^{C}
Shori Maekawa (JPN)	1
Murodjon Tuychiev (TJK)	0
Nurmakhan Tinaliyev (KAZ)	7

Round of 16
Ramón García (DOM)	7
Juan Pablo Melo (URU)	0
Mihály Deák-Bárdos (HUN)	4^{C}
Miloslav Metodiev (BUL)	1
Zaur Mehraliyev (AZE)	0
Heiki Nabi (EST)	3
Radhouane Chebbi (TUN)	0
Nurmakhan Tinaliyev (KAZ)	8

Quarterfinals
Ramón García (DOM)	5
Mihály Deák-Bárdos (HUN)	8^{F}
Heiki Nabi (EST)	2^{C}
Nurmakhan Tinaliyev (KAZ)	0

Semifinals
Mihály Deák-Bárdos (HUN)	0
Heiki Nabi (EST)	6

=== Bottom half ===
Round of 32
Rıza Kayaalp (TUR)	4^{F}
Naveen Sevlia (IND)	0
Sergey Andrusik (RUS)	7
Juan Camacaro (VEN)	0
Ioseb Chugoshvili (BLR)	5
Hwang Jong-won (KOR)	0
Nie Xiaoming (CHN)	1
Robby Smith (USA)	3
Vachik Yeghiazaryan (ARM)	0
Eduard Popp (GER)	1
Mindaugas Mizgaitis (LTU)	3
Levan Arabuli (GEO)	4
Ali Nadhim (IRQ)	0
Johan Eurén (SWE)	8
Amir Aliakbari (IRI)	3^{F}
Oleksandr Chernetskyi (UKR)	1

Round of 16
Rıza Kayaalp (TUR)	3
Sergey Andrusik (RUS)	0
Ioseb Chugoshvili (BLR)	0
Robby Smith (USA)	5
Eduard Popp (GER)	6
Levan Arabuli (GEO)	4
Johan Eurén (SWE)	0
Amir Aliakbari (IRI)	7

Quarterfinals
Rıza Kayaalp (TUR)	7
Robby Smith (USA)	0
Eduard Popp (GER)	0
Amir Aliakbari (IRI)	7

Semifinals
Rıza Kayaalp (TUR)	1
Amir Aliakbari (IRI)	4

=== Repechage ===
Repechage round 1
Kamil Błoński (POL)	4
Zaur Mehraliyev (AZE)	0
Oleksandr Chernetskyi (UKR)	2
Johan Eurén (SWE)	7

Repechage round 2
Kamil Błoński (POL)	0
Nurmakhan Tinaliyev (KAZ)	8
Johan Eurén (SWE)	1
Eduard Popp (GER)	0

Bronze medals
Nurmakhan Tinaliyev (KAZ)	5
Mihály Deák-Bárdos (HUN)	0
Johan Eurén (SWE)	0
Rıza Kayaalp (TUR)	3

- Amir Aliakbari of Iran originally won the gold medal, but was disqualified after he tested positive for Anabolic steroids. Heiki Nabi was upgraded to the gold medal, Rıza Kayaalp to the silver medal and Johan Eurén was raised to third and took the bronze medal.
