= 2018 European Wrestling Championships – Men's Greco-Roman 130 kg =

Wrestling competition

The Men's Greco-Roman 130 kg is a competition featured at the 2018 European Wrestling Championships, and was held in Kaspiysk, Russia on April 30 and May 1.

== Medalists ==
Gold	Rıza Kayaalp; Turkey
Silver	Vitaly Shchur; Russia
Bronze	Alin Alexuc-Ciurariu; Romania
Bronze	Iakob Kajaia; Georgia

== Results ==
Legend

- F — Won by fall
- WO — Won by walkover

=== Main Bracket ===
1/8 finals
Bálint Lám (HUN)	0
Rıza Kayaalp (TUR)	9
Stepan David (CZE)	0
Alin Alexuc-Ciurariu (ROU)	4
Mantas Knystautas (LTU)	8
Christian John (GER)	5
Juan Heredia (ESP)	0
Iakob Kajaia (GEO)	8
Vladyslav Voronyi (UKR)	3
Turman Eyubov (AZE)	0
Vitaly Shchur (RUS)	9
Artur Vititin (EST)	0
Rafał Krajewski (POL)
Miloslav Metodiev (BUL)	WO

Quarterfinals
Georgi Chugoshvili (BLR)	0
Rıza Kayaalp (TUR)	5
Alin Alexuc-Ciurariu (ROU)	2
Mantas Knystautas (LTU)	2
Iakob Kajaia (GEO)	9
Vladyslav Voronyi (UKR)	0
Vitaly Shchur (RUS)	9
Miloslav Metodiev (BUL)	0

Semifinals
Rıza Kayaalp (TUR)	4
Alin Alexuc-Ciurariu (ROU)	0
Iakob Kajaia (GEO)	4
Vitaly Shchur (RUS)	5

Final
Rıza Kayaalp (TUR)	2
Vitaly Shchur (RUS)	1

=== Repechage ===
Repechage round 1
Bálint Lám (HUN)	3
Georgi Chugoshvili (BLR)	0
Artur Vititin (EST)	0
Miloslav Metodiev (BUL)	3^{F}

Bronze medal match
Bálint Lám (HUN)	1
Alin Alexuc-Ciurariu (ROU)	3
Miloslav Metodiev (BUL)	0
Iakob Kajaia (GEO)	5
