= Abdelrahman El-Trabely =

Egyptian Greco-Roman wrestler

Personal information
- Full name: Abdelrahman Yahia Abdulsalam; Muhammad El-Trabily
- Nationality: Egypt
- Born: 7 September 1989 Port Said, Egypt
- Died: 16 August 2013 (aged 23)
- Height: 1.90 m (6 ft 3 in)
- Weight: 120 kg (265 lb)

Sport
- Sport: Wrestling
- Event: Greco-Roman

Abdelrahman Yahia Abdulsalam Muhammad El-Trabily (also Abdelrahman El-Trabely, Arabic: عبد الرحمن يحيي عبد السلام محمد الطرابيلي; September 7, 1989 – August 19, 2013) was an amateur Egyptian Greco-Roman wrestler, who competed in the men's super heavyweight category.

El-Trabely represented Egypt at the 2012 Summer Olympics in London, where he competed for the men's 120 kg class. He received a bye for the preliminary round of sixteen match, before losing out to Cuban wrestler and defending Olympic champion Mijaín López, who was able to score four points in two straight periods, leaving El-Trabely without a single point. Because his opponent advanced further into the final match, El-Trabely offered another shot for the bronze medal by entering the repechage bouts. He was defeated in the first round by Georgia's Guram Pherselidze, with a three-set technical score (3–3, 0–4, 0–3), and a classification point score of 1–3.

El-Trabely was shot dead by Egyptian Security forces during a protest in support of ousted Egyptian president Mohamad Morsi.
