= 2020 European Wrestling Championships – Men's Greco-Roman 130 kg =

Wrestling competition

The men's Greco-Roman 130 kg is a competition featured at the 2020 European Wrestling Championships, and was held in Rome, Italy on February 10 and February 11.

== Medalists ==
Gold	Alin Alexuc-Ciurariu; Romania
Silver	Levan Arabuli; Georgia
Bronze	Mykola Kuchmii; Ukraine
Bronze	Jello Krahmer; Germany

== Results ==
Legend

- F — Won by fall
- WO — Won by walkover

1/8 finals
Sabah Shariati (AZE)	3
David Ovasapyan (ARM)	0
Zurabi Gedekhauri (RUS)	0
Alin Alexuc-Ciurariu (ROU)	4
Ádám Varga (HUN)	0
Rıza Kayaalp (TUR)	6
Radoslav Georgiev (BUL)	0
Mykola Kuchmii (UKR)	6
Rafał Krajewski (POL)	1
Arvi Savolainen (FIN)	4
Pavel Rudakou (BLR)	1
Štěpán David (CZE)	3
Levan Arabuli (GEO)	9
El Mahdi Roccaro (ITA)	0
Romas Fridrikas (LTU)	2
Jello Krahmer (GER)	3

Quarterfinals
Sabah Shariati (AZE)	2
Alin Alexuc-Ciurariu (ROU)	3
Rıza Kayaalp (TUR)	1
Mykola Kuchmii (UKR)	5
Arvi Savolainen (FIN)	4
Štěpán David (CZE)	0
Levan Arabuli (GEO)	9
Jello Krahmer (GER)	0

Semifinals
Alin Alexuc-Ciurariu (ROU)	2
Mykola Kuchmii (UKR)	1
Arvi Savolainen (FIN)	0
Levan Arabuli (GEO)	9

Final
Alin Alexuc-Ciurariu (ROU)	6
Levan Arabuli (GEO)	1

Repechage round 1
Zurabi Gedekhauri (RUS)	WO
Sabah Shariati (AZE)
El Mahdi Roccaro (ITA)	0
Jello Krahmer (GER)	9

Bronze medal match
Zurabi Gedekhauri (RUS)	2
Mykola Kuchmii (UKR)	2
Jello Krahmer (GER)	1
Arvi Savolainen (FIN)	1

== Final standing ==
Rank	Athlete
1st place, gold medalist(s)	Alin Alexuc-Ciurariu (ROU)
2nd place, silver medalist(s)	Levan Arabuli (GEO)
3rd place, bronze medalist(s)	Mykola Kuchmii (UKR)
3rd place, bronze medalist(s)	Jello Krahmer (GER)
5	Zurabi Gedekhauri (RUS)
5	Arvi Savolainen (FIN)
7	Rıza Kayaalp (TUR)
8	Sabah Shariati (AZE)
9	Štěpán David (CZE)
10	Romas Fridrikas (LTU)
11	Pavel Rudakou (BLR)
12	Rafał Krajewski (POL)
13	David Ovasapyan (ARM)
14	Ádám Varga (HUN)
15	Radoslav Georgiev (BUL)
16	El Mahdi Roccaro (ITA)
