= 2014 World Wrestling Championships – Men's Greco-Roman 130 kg =

Men's Greco-Roman 130 kg at the 2014 World Championships
- Venue: Gymnastics Sport Palace
- Dates: 13 September 2014
- Competitors: 23 from 23 nations

Medalists
gold medal	Mijaín López	Cuba
silver medal	Rıza Kayaalp	Turkey
bronze medal	Heiki Nabi	Estonia
bronze medal	Bilyal Makhov	Russia

The men's Greco-Roman 130 kilograms is a competition featured at the 2014 World Wrestling Championships, and was held in Tashkent, Uzbekistan on 13 September 2014.

This Greco-Roman wrestling competition consisted of a single-elimination tournament, with a repechage used to determine the winners of two bronze medals.

== Results ==
Legend

- C — Won by 3 cautions given to the opponent
- F — Won by fall

=== Final ===
Final
Rıza Kayaalp (TUR)	0
Mijaín López (CUB)	2

=== Top half ===
Round of 32

Round of 16
Heiki Nabi (EST)	4
Kiryl Hryshchanka (BLR)	0
Bálint Lám (HUN)	0
Rıza Kayaalp (TUR)	4
Robby Smith (USA)	8
Hwang Jong-won (KOR)	2
Meng Qiang (CHN)	5
Lyubomir Dimitrov (BUL)	5

Quarterfinals
Heiki Nabi (EST)	0
Rıza Kayaalp (TUR)	4
Robby Smith (USA)	0
Lyubomir Dimitrov (BUL)	9

Semifinals
Rıza Kayaalp (TUR)	4^{F}
Lyubomir Dimitrov (BUL)	0

=== Bottom half ===
Round of 32
Johan Eurén (SWE)	1
Mindaugas Mizgaitis (LTU)	0
Abror Mamasoliev (UZB)	3
Iakobi Kajaia (GEO)	10
Arata Sonoda (JPN)	4
Bilyal Makhov (RUS)	5^{F}
Oleksandr Chernetskyi (UKR)	1
Behnam Mehdizadeh (IRI)	2
Nurmakhan Tinaliyev (KAZ)	6^{C}
Dharmender Dalal (IND)	0
Mijaín López (CUB)	10
Murodjon Tuychiev (TJK)	2
Vachik Yeghiazaryan (ARM)	0
Eduard Popp (GER)	8

Round of 16
Sabah Shariati (AZE)	2
Johan Eurén (SWE)	2
Iakobi Kajaia (GEO)	2
Bilyal Makhov (RUS)	10^{F}
Behnam Mehdizadeh (IRI)	1
Nurmakhan Tinaliyev (KAZ)	0
Mijaín López (CUB)	8
Eduard Popp (GER)	0

Quarterfinals
Johan Eurén (SWE)	1
Bilyal Makhov (RUS)	2
Behnam Mehdizadeh (IRI)	0
Mijaín López (CUB)	6^{C}

Semifinals
Bilyal Makhov (RUS)	0
Mijaín López (CUB)	1

=== Repechage ===
Repechage round 1
Murodjon Tuychiev (TJK)	0
Eduard Popp (GER)	8

Repechage round 2
Bálint Lám (HUN)	1
Heiki Nabi (EST)	3
Eduard Popp (GER)	6
Behnam Mehdizadeh (IRI)	0

Bronze medals
Heiki Nabi (EST)	1
Lyubomir Dimitrov (BUL)	0
Eduard Popp (GER)	0
Bilyal Makhov (RUS)	9
