= 2013 European Wrestling Championships – Men's Greco-Roman 120 kg =

The men's Greco-Roman 120 kg is a competition featured at the 2013 European Wrestling Championships, and was held at the Tbilisi Sports Palace in Tbilisi, Georgia on 23 March 2013.

== Medalists ==
Gold	Rıza Kayaalp; Turkey
Silver	Yevhenii Orlov; Ukraine
Bronze	Vachik Yeghiazaryan; Armenia
Bronze	Guram Pherselidze; Georgia

== Results ==
Legend

- F — Won by fall
- R — Retired
- WO — Won by walkover

=== Final ===
Final
Yevhenii Orlov (UKR)	0	0
Rıza Kayaalp (TUR)	2	1

=== Top half ===
Round of 32

Round of 16
David Vála (CZE)	0	0
Vachik Yeghiazaryan (ARM)	2	1
Yevhenii Orlov (UKR)	0	2	2
Shokhruddi Ayubov (RUS)	1	0	0
Bálint Lám (HUN)	0	1	1
Eduard Popp (GER)	4	0	2
Sebastian Lönnborn (SWE)	0
Lyubomir Dimitrov (BUL)	9^{F}

Quarterfinals
Vachik Yeghiazaryan (ARM)	0	0
Yevhenii Orlov (UKR)	1	1
Eduard Popp (GER)	0	0
Lyubomir Dimitrov (BUL)	2	1

Semifinals
Yevhenii Orlov (UKR)	1
Lyubomir Dimitrov (BUL)	1^{R}

=== Bottom half ===
Round of 32
Heiki Nabi (EST)	0	0
Guram Pherselidze (GEO)	1	1

Round of 16
Mindaugas Mizgaitis (LTU)	0	1
Ioseb Chugoshvili (BLR)	1	1
Radomir Petković (AZE)	0	0
Rıza Kayaalp (TUR)	1	2
Kamil Błoński (POL)	0	0
Dávid Lengyel (SVK)	1	7
Marko Koščević (CRO)	0	1
Guram Pherselidze (GEO)	3	5

Quarterfinals
Ioseb Chugoshvili (BLR)	0	0
Rıza Kayaalp (TUR)	1	1
Dávid Lengyel (SVK)	0	0
Guram Pherselidze (GEO)	1	3

Semifinals
Rıza Kayaalp (TUR)	5^{F}
Guram Pherselidze (GEO)	1

=== Repechage ===
Repechage round 2
Shokhruddi Ayubov (RUS)	3	0	0
Vachik Yeghiazaryan (ARM)	2	2	3
Radomir Petković (AZE)	0	0
Ioseb Chugoshvili (BLR)	1	1

Bronze medals
Vachik Yeghiazaryan (ARM)	W	O
Lyubomir Dimitrov (BUL)
Ioseb Chugoshvili (BLR)	0	1
Guram Pherselidze (GEO)	1	2
