= Guram Pherselidze =

Georgian Greco-Roman wrestler

Personal information
- Nationality: Georgia
- Born: 16 October 1985 (age 40) Khelvachauri, Adjara, Georgian; SSR, Soviet Union
- Height: 1.90 m (6 ft 3 in)
- Weight: 118 kg (260 lb)

Sport
- Style: Greco-Roman
- Coach: Vaja Kravjashvili
Medal record
Men's Greco-Roman wrestling
Representing Georgia
European Championships
| Bronze medal – third place | 2013 Tbilisi | 120 kg |

Guram Pherselidze (Georgian: გურამ ფერსელიძე; born October 16, 1985, in Khelvachauri, Adjara) is an amateur Georgian Greco-Roman wrestler, who played for the men's super heavyweight category. He won a bronze medal in the same weight division at the 2013 European Wrestling Championships in Tbilisi.

Pherselidze represented Georgia at the 2012 Summer Olympics in London, where he competed in the men's 120 kg class. He defeated Chile's Andrés Ayub in the preliminary round of sixteen, before losing out the quarterfinal match to Cuban wrestler and defending Olympic champion Mijaín López, who was able to score four points in two straight periods, leaving Pherselidze without a single point. Because his opponent advanced further into the final match, Pherselidze offered another shot for the bronze medal by defeating Egypt's Abdelrahman El-Trabely in the repechage rounds. He progressed to the bronze medal match, but narrowly lost the medal to Turkey's Rıza Kayaalp, with a technical score of 0–2, and a classification point score of 0–3.
