= Hilleste =

Village in Estonia

- Village
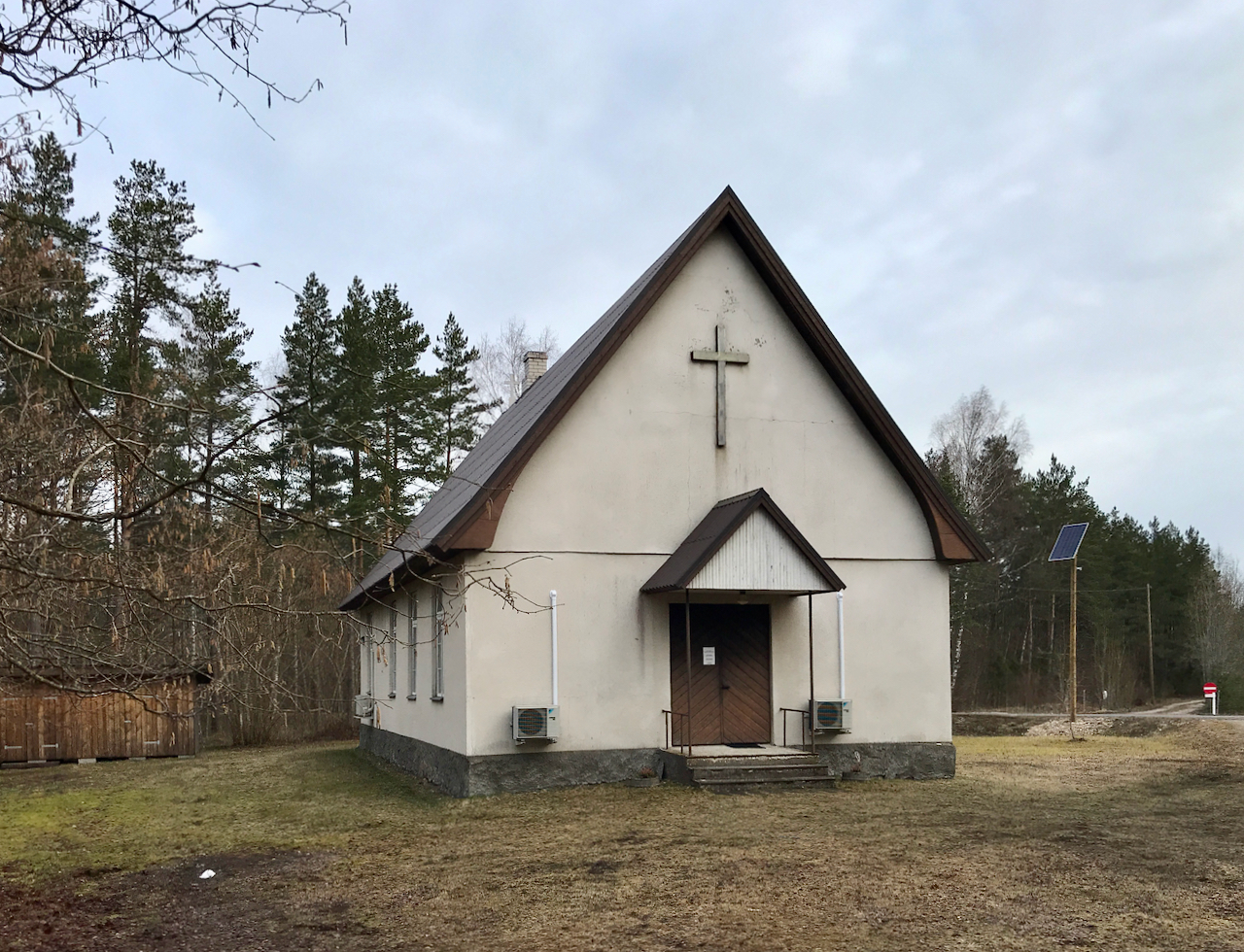

- Location within Estonia
- Coordinates: 58°52′N 22°59′E
- Country: Estonia
- County: Hiiu County
- Parish: Hiiumaa Parish

Population (01.01.2019)
  - Total: 23
- Time zone: UTC+2 (EET)
  - Summer (DST): UTC+3 (EEST)

Hilleste is a village in Hiiumaa Parish, Hiiu County in northwestern Estonia.

The wrestler Heiki Nabi (born 1985) was born in Hilleste.

The village was probably first mentioned in 1539 (Hilliast). Historically, the village was part of Pühalepa Church Manor (Estonian: Pühalepa kirikumõis).
