= Bálint Lám =

Hungarian Greco-Roman wrestler

Personal information
- Nationality: Hungarian
- Born: 14 May 1992 (age 34) Budapest, Hungary
- Height: 2.04 m (6 ft 8 in)
- Weight: 135 kg (298 lb)

Sport
- Sport: Wrestling
- Event: Greco-Roman
Medal record
Representing Hungary
Men's Greco-Roman wrestling
European Championships
Silver medal – second place	2017 Novi Sad	130 kg
Universiade
Bronze medal – third place	2013 Kazan	120 kg
- Updated on 23 April 2018

Bálint Lám (born May 14, 1992) is a Hungarian Greco-Roman wrestler. He won silver medal at the 2017 European Wrestling Championships.

== Major results ==
Year	Tournament	Venue	Result	Event
2013	European Championships	(Georgia (country)) Tbilisi, Georgia	10th	Greco-Roman 120 kg
2013	Summer Universiade	Kazan, Russia	3rd	Greco-Roman 120 kg
2014	European Championships	Vantaa, Finland	5th	Greco-Roman 130 kg
2014	World Championships	Tashkent, Uzbekistan	18th	Greco-Roman 130 kg
2015	European Games	Baku, Azerbaijan	5th	Greco-Roman 130 kg
2015	World Championships	Las Vegas, United States	12th	Greco-Roman 130 kg
2017	European Championships	Novi Sad, Serbia	2nd	Greco-Roman 130 kg
2017	World Championships	Paris, France	22nd	Greco-Roman 130 kg
2018	European Championships	Kaspiysk, Russia	5th	Greco-Roman 130 kg
2018	World Championships	Budapest, Hungary	20th	Greco-Roman 130 kg
2019	European Championships	Bucharest, Romania	17th	Greco-Roman 130 kg
2019	World Championships	Nur-Sultan, Kazakhstan	18th	Greco-Roman 130 kg
2019	Military World Games	Wuhan, China	10th	Greco-Roman 130 kg
