= Artur Vititin =

Estonian wrestler (born 1997)

Personal information
- Born: 13 June 1997 (age 29)
- Height: 1.81 m (5 ft 11 in)

Sport
- Country: Estonia
- Sport: Greco-Roman wrestling

Artur Vititin (born 13 June 1997) is an Estonian Greco-Roman wrestler. He competed in the 2020 Summer Olympics held in Tokyo, Japan.
