= Wrestling at the 2012 Summer Olympics – Men's Greco-Roman 120 kg =

Men's Greco-Roman 120 kg at the Games of the XXX Olympiad
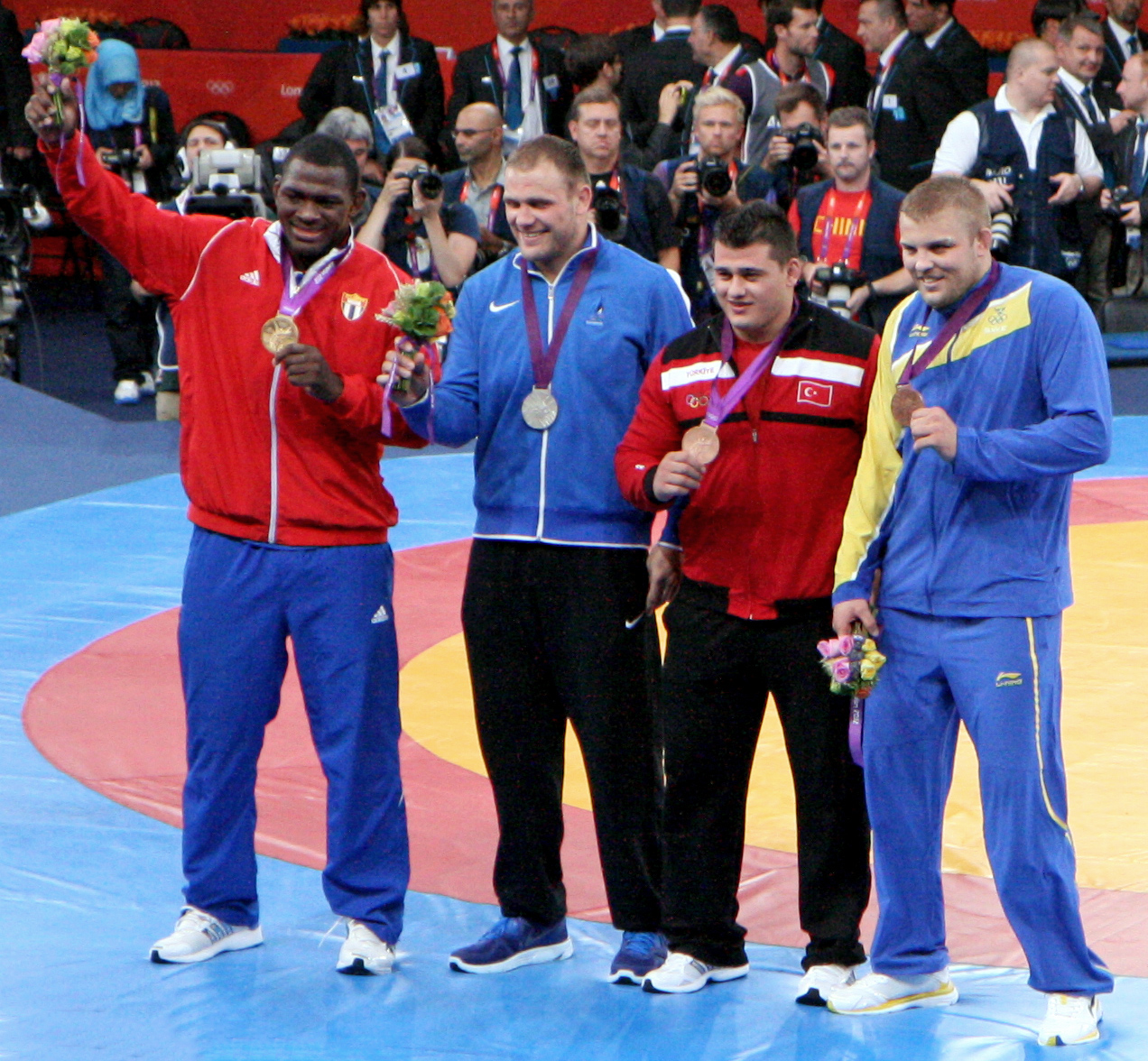
- Medalists at the Men's 120 kg
- Venue: ExCeL London
- Date: 6 August 2012
- Competitors: 20 from 20 nations

Medalists
1st place, gold medalist(s)		Mijaín López	Cuba
2nd place, silver medalist(s)		Heiki Nabi	Estonia
3rd place, bronze medalist(s)		Rıza Kayaalp	Turkey
3rd place, bronze medalist(s)		Johan Eurén	Sweden

Men's Greco-Roman 120 kilograms competition at the 2012 Summer Olympics in London, United Kingdom, took place on 11 August at ExCeL London.

This Greco-Roman wrestling competition consists of a single-elimination tournament, with a repechage used to determine the winner of two bronze medals. The two finalists face off for gold and silver medals. Each wrestler who loses to one of the two finalists moves into the repechage, culminating in a pair of bronze medal matches featuring the semifinal losers each facing the remaining repechage opponent from their half of the bracket.

Each bout consists of up to three rounds, lasting two minutes apiece. The wrestler who scores more points in each round is the winner of that rounds; the bout ends when one wrestler has won two rounds (and thus the match).

The winner of the event, Mijaín López, won his second Olympic title.

== Schedule ==
All times are British Summer Time (UTC+01:00)

Date	Time	Event
6 August 2012	13:00	Qualification rounds
6 August 2012	17:45	Repechage
6 August 2012	18:30	Finals

== Results ==
=== Final ===
Final
Mijaín López (CUB)	2	1
Heiki Nabi (EST)	0	0

=== Top half ===
Qualifications

1/8 finals
Guram Pherselidze (GEO)	2	2
Andrés Ayub (CHI)	0	0
Abdelrahman El-Trabely (EGY)	0	0
Mijaín López (CUB)	1	3
Muminjon Abdullaev (UZB)	0	0
Dremiel Byers (USA)	1	2
Rıza Kayaalp (TUR)	3	1
Yevhen Orlov (UKR)	0	0

1/4 finals
Guram Pherselidze (GEO)	0	0
Mijaín López (CUB)	1	3
Dremiel Byers (USA)	0	0
Rıza Kayaalp (TUR)	1	1

Semifinals
Mijaín López (CUB)	2	1
Rıza Kayaalp (TUR)	0	0

=== Bottom half ===
Qualifications
Liu Deli (CHN)	0	1	0
Mihály Deák-Bárdos (HUN)	1	0	1
Johan Eurén (SWE)	3	1
Nurmakhan Tinaliyev (KAZ)	0	0
Yury Patrikeyev (ARM)	0	3	1
Khasan Baroev (RUS)	1	0	0
Bashir Babajanzadeh (IRI)	1	2
Ali Nadhim (IRQ)	0	0

1/8 finals
Łukasz Banak (POL)	2	1
Radhouane Chebbi (TUN)	0	0
Heiki Nabi (EST)	0	1	3
Ioseb Chugoshvili (BLR)	1	0	0
Mihály Deák-Bárdos (HUN)	0	0
Johan Eurén (SWE)	1	2
Yury Patrikeyev (ARM)	0	1	0
Bashir Babajanzadeh (IRI)	1	0	2

1/4 finals
Łukasz Banak (POL)	0	0
Heiki Nabi (EST)	1	1
Johan Eurén (SWE)	3	1
Bashir Babajanzadeh (IRI)	0	0

Semifinals
Heiki Nabi (EST)	0	1	1
Johan Eurén (SWE)	1	0	0

=== Repechage ===
Repechage round 2
Abdelrahman El-Trabely (EGY)	3	0	0
Guram Pherselidze (GEO)	3	4	3
Ioseb Chugoshvili (BLR)	2	1
Łukasz Banak (POL)	0	0

Bronze medals
Guram Pherselidze (GEO)	0	0
Rıza Kayaalp (TUR)	1	1
Ioseb Chugoshvili (BLR)	0	1	0
Johan Eurén (SWE)	1	0	1

== Final standing ==
Rank	Athlete
1st place, gold medalist(s)	Mijaín López (CUB)
2nd place, silver medalist(s)	Heiki Nabi (EST)
3rd place, bronze medalist(s)	Rıza Kayaalp (TUR)
3rd place, bronze medalist(s)	Johan Eurén (SWE)
5	Guram Pherselidze (GEO)
5	Ioseb Chugoshvili (BLR)
7	Bashir Babajanzadeh (IRI)
8	Yury Patrikeyev (ARM)
9	Dremiel Byers (USA)
10	Łukasz Banak (POL)
11	Mihály Deák-Bárdos (HUN)
12	Abdelrahman El-Trabely (EGY)
13	Liu Deli (CHN)
14	Khasan Baroev (RUS)
15	Muminjon Abdullaev (UZB)
15	Ali Nadhim (IRQ)
15	Radhouane Chebbi (TUN)
18	Yevhen Orlov (UKR)
18	Nurmakhan Tinaliyev (KAZ)
18	Andrés Ayub (CHI)
