= Heiki Nabi =

Estonian Greco-Roman wrestler

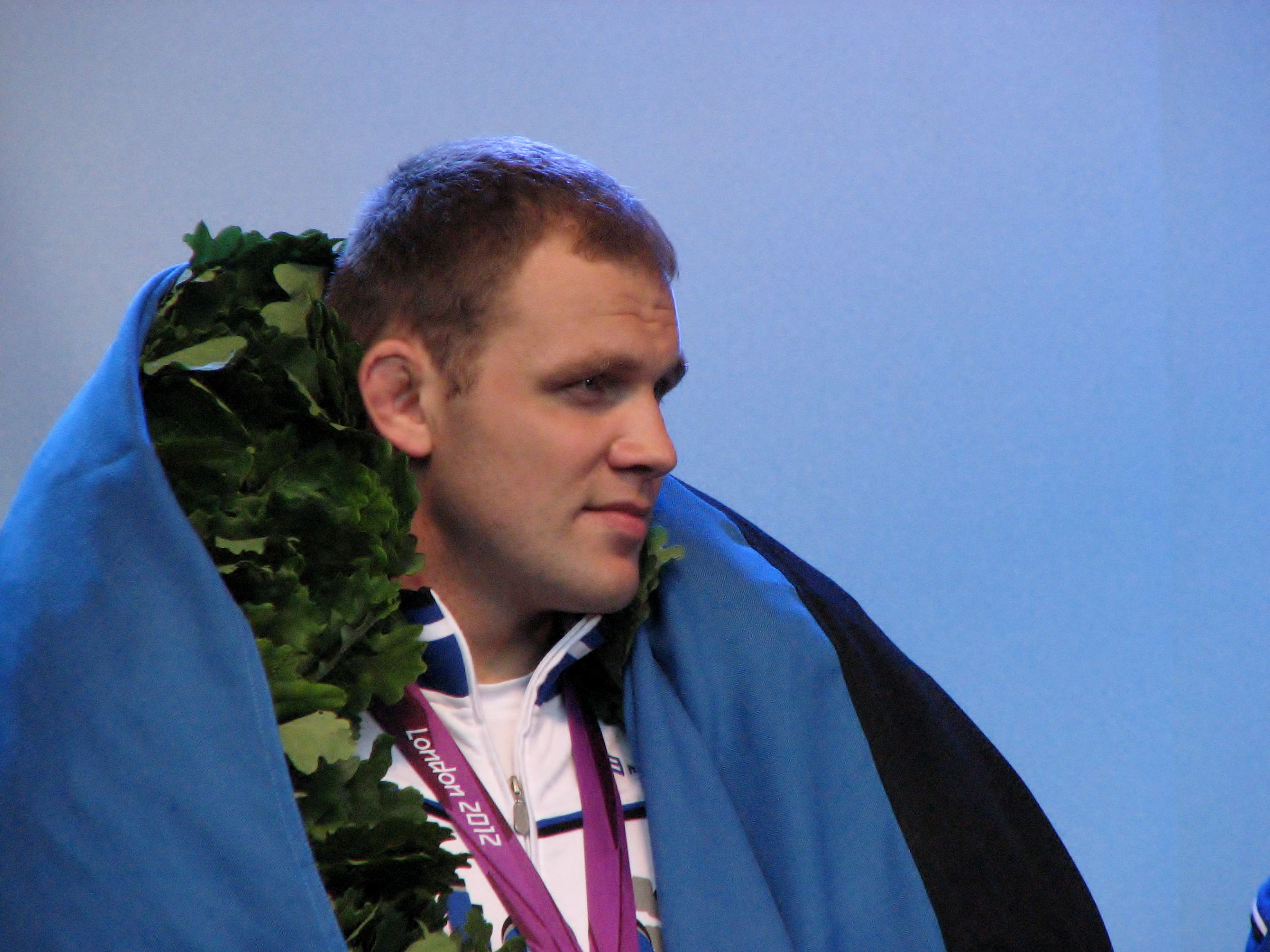
- Heiki Nabi at the 2012 London Summer Olympics

Personal information
- Nationality: Estonian
- Born: 6 June 1985 (age 41) Hilleste, then part of Estonian SSR, Soviet Union
- Height: 1.93 m (6 ft 4 in)
- Weight: 114 kg (251 lb)

Sport
- Sport: Wrestling
- Event: Greco-Roman
Medal record
Men's Greco-Roman wrestling
Representing Estonia
Olympic Games
Silver medal – second place	2012 London	120 kg
World Championships
Gold medal – first place	2006 Guangzhou	96 kg
Gold medal – first place	2013 Budapest	120 kg
Silver medal – second place	2017 Paris	130 kg
Bronze medal – third place	2014 Tashkent	130 kg
Bronze medal – third place	2019 Nur-Sultan	130 kg
European Games
Bronze medal – third place	2015 Baku	130 kg
Universiade
Bronze medal – third place	2005 İzmir	96 kg
- Updated on 23 August 2017

Heiki Nabi (born 6 June 1985) is an Estonian Olympic runner-up Greco-Roman wrestler.

Nabi was born in Hilleste, Hiiumaa. At the 2006 World Wrestling Championships he won the gold medal in the men's Greco-Roman (96 kg) category and became the first amateur wrestling World Champion for his home country, because previous Estonian wrestling World Champion August Englas (1953 and 1954) competed for Soviet Union. At the 2012 Summer Olympics in London, Nabi won the silver medal in the Men's Greco-Roman 120kg.

He competed at the 2024 European Wrestling Olympic Qualification Tournament in Baku, Azerbaijan hoping to qualify for the 2024 Summer Olympics in Paris, France. He was eliminated in his first match and he did not qualify for the Olympics. Nabi also competed at the 2024 World Wrestling Olympic Qualification Tournament held in Istanbul, Turkey without qualifying for the Olympics. However, Nabi received a quota due to reallocations of Individual Neutral Athletes (AIN) claimed by the IOC, garnering him a place on the Estonian Olympic team. He competed in the 130 kg event at the Olympics and finished 10th.

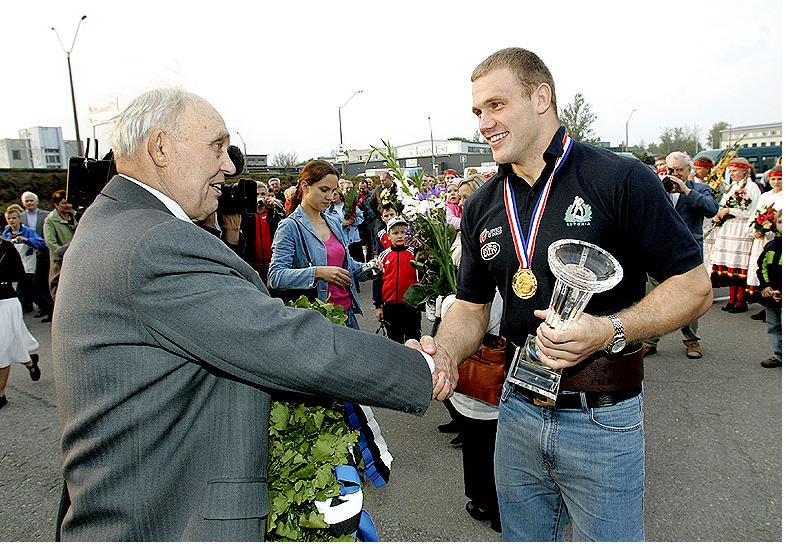
Nabi (right) greeted by former Estonian wrestler August Englas in 2007.

== Achievements ==
Year	Tournament	Venue	Result	Event
2005	European Championships	Varna, Bulgaria	17th	Greco-Roman 120 kg
2005	Universiade	İzmir, Turkey	3rd	Greco-Roman 96 kg
2006	European Championships	Moscow, Russia	9th	Greco-Roman 96 kg
2006	University World Championships	Ulaanbaatar, Mongolia	3rd	Greco-Roman 96 kg
2006	World Championships	Guangzhou, China	1st	Greco-Roman 96 kg
2007	European Championships	Sofia, Bulgaria	5th	Greco-Roman 96 kg
2007	World Championships	Baku, Azerbaijan	24th	Greco-Roman 96 kg
2008	European Championships	Tampere, Finland	5th	Greco-Roman 96 kg
2009	European Championships	Vilnius, Lithuania	7th	Greco-Roman 96 kg
2009	World Championships	Herning, Denmark	11th	Greco-Roman 96 kg
2010	European Championships	Baku, Azerbaijan	14th	Greco-Roman 120 kg
2010	World Championships	Moscow, Russia	14th	Greco-Roman 120 kg
2011	European Championships	Dortmund, Germany	5th	Greco-Roman 120 kg
2011	World Championships	Istanbul, Turkey	27th	Greco-Roman 120 kg
2012	European Championships	Belgrade, Serbia	16th	Greco-Roman 120 kg
2012	Summer Olympics	London, United Kingdom	2nd	Greco-Roman 120 kg
2013	European Championships	(Georgia (country)) Tbilisi, Georgia	14th	Greco-Roman 120 kg
2013	World Championships	Budapest, Hungary	1st	Greco-Roman 120 kg
2014	European Championships	Vantaa, Finland	11th	Greco-Roman 130 kg
2014	World Championships	Tashkent, Uzbekistan	3rd	Greco-Roman 130 kg
2015	European Games	Baku, Azerbaijan	3rd	Greco-Roman 130 kg
2015	World Championships	Las Vegas, United States	8th	Greco-Roman 130 kg
2015	Military World Games	Mungyeong, South Korea	1st	Greco-Roman 130 kg
2016	European Championships	Riga, Latvia	10th	Greco-Roman 130 kg
2016	Summer Olympics	Rio de Janeiro, Brazil	5th	Greco-Roman 130 kg
2017	European Championships	Novi Sad, Serbia	14th	Greco-Roman 130 kg
2017	World Championships	Paris, France	2nd	Greco-Roman 130 kg
2018	World Championships	Budapest, Hungary	5th	Greco-Roman 130 kg
2019	European Championships	Bucharest, Romania	5th	Greco-Roman 130 kg
2019	World Championships	Nur-Sultan, Kazakhstan	3rd	Greco-Roman 130 kg
2019	Military World Games	Wuhan, China	2nd	Greco-Roman 130 kg

Awards
Preceded by Gerd Kanter	Estonian Sportsman of the Year; 2012	Succeeded by Nikolai Novosjolov
