= Levan Arabuli =

Georgian Greco-Roman wrestler

Personal information
- Born: 29 March 1992 (age 34)
- Height: 193 cm (6 ft 4 in)

Sport
- Country: Georgia
- Sport: Amateur wrestling
- Event: Greco-Roman
Medal record
Men's Greco-Roman wrestling
Representing Georgia
European Championships
Silver medal – second place	2020 Rome	130 kg
Bronze medal – third place	2017 Novi Sad	130 kg

Levan Arabuli (born 29 March 1992) is a Georgian Greco-Roman wrestler. He won the silver medal in the 130 kg event at the 2020 European Wrestling Championships held in Rome, Italy. In the final, he lost against Alin Alexuc-Ciurariu of Romania.

In 2017, he won one of the bronze medals in the 130 kg event at the European Wrestling Championships held in Novi Sad, Serbia.

== Achievements ==
Year	Tournament	Location	Result	Event
2017	European Championships	Novi Sad, Serbia	3rd	Greco-Roman 130 kg
2020	European Championships	Rome, Italy	2nd	Greco-Roman 130 kg
