= Vachik Yeghiazaryan =

Armenian Greco-Roman wrestler

Personal information
- Born: 1 May 1991 (age 35) Yerevan, Armenia
- Height: 1.84 m (6 ft 1/2 in)
- Weight: 123 kg (271 lb)

Sport
- Sport: Wrestling
- Event: Greco-Roman
- Coached by: Mikael Egoyan; Armen Babalaryan
Medal record
Representing Armenia
Men's Greco-Roman wrestling
European Championships
Bronze medal – third place	2013 Tbilisi	120 kg

Vachik Yeghiazaryan (Armenian: Վաչիկ Եղիազարյան; born 1 May 1991) is an Armenian Greco-Roman wrestler.

== Career ==
He became a Champion of Armenia in 2010. Yeghiazaryan won a bronze medal at the 2013 European Wrestling Championships in Tbilisi.
