= 2021 World Wrestling Championships – Men's Greco-Roman 130 kg =

Wrestling competitions

Men's Greco-Roman 130 kg at the 2021 World Championships
- Venue: Nye Jordal Amfi
- Dates: 8–9 October 2021
- Competitors: 22 from 22 nations

Medalists
gold medal	Ali Akbar Yousefi	Iran
silver medal	Zurabi Gedekhauri	RWF
bronze medal	Iakobi Kajaia	Georgia
bronze medal	Oskar Marvik	Norway

The men's Greco-Roman 130 kilograms is a competition featured at the 2021 World Wrestling Championships, and was held in Oslo, Norway on 8 and 9 October.

This Greco-Roman wrestling competition consists of a single-elimination tournament, with a repechage used to determine the winner of two bronze medals. The two finalists face off for gold and silver medals. Each wrestler who loses to one of the two finalists moves into the repechage, culminating in a pair of bronze medal matches featuring the semifinal losers each facing the remaining repechage opponent from their half of the bracket.

Ali Akbar Yousefi from Iran won the gold medal.

== Results ==
=== Final ===
Final
Zurabi Gedekhauri (RWF)	1
Ali Akbar Yousefi (IRI)	5

=== Top half ===
Round of 32

Round of 16
Iakobi Kajaia (GEO)	5
Cohlton Schultz (USA)	3
Štěpán David (CZE)	0
Beka Kandelaki (AZE)	9
Rafał Krajewski (POL)	3
Osman Yıldırım (TUR)	5
Mantas Knystautas (LTU)	1
Zurabi Gedekhauri (RWF)	1

Quarterfinals
Iakobi Kajaia (GEO)	5
Beka Kandelaki (AZE)	1
Osman Yıldırım (TUR)	1
Zurabi Gedekhauri (RWF)	4

Semifinals
Iakobi Kajaia (GEO)	1
Zurabi Gedekhauri (RWF)	2

=== Bottom half ===
Round of 32
Arata Sonoda (JPN)	2
David Ovasapyan (ARM)	4
Alimkhan Syzdykov (KAZ)	0
Oskar Marvik (NOR)	4
Radoslav Georgiev (BUL)	9
Sonu Sharma (IND)	0
Konsta Mäenpää (FIN)	1
Alin Alexuc-Ciurariu (ROU)	2
Jello Krahmer (GER)	3
Lee Seung-chan (KOR)	0
Marko Koščević (CRO)	1
Mykola Kuchmii (UKR)	5

Round of 16
Ali Akbar Yousefi (IRI)	6
David Ovasapyan (ARM)	1
Oskar Marvik (NOR)	5
Radoslav Georgiev (BUL)	0
Alin Alexuc-Ciurariu (ROU)	3
Jello Krahmer (GER)	1
Mykola Kuchmii (UKR)	1
Yasmani Acosta (CHI)	2

Quarterfinals
Ali Akbar Yousefi (IRI)	2
Oskar Marvik (NOR)	1
Alin Alexuc-Ciurariu (ROU)	1
Yasmani Acosta (CHI)	1

Semifinals
Ali Akbar Yousefi (IRI)	2
Yasmani Acosta (CHI)	1

=== Repechage ===
Repechage round 2
Mantas Knystautas (LTU)	1
Osman Yıldırım (TUR)	2
David Ovasapyan (ARM)	0
Oskar Marvik (NOR)	3

Bronze medals
Osman Yıldırım (TUR)	1
Iakobi Kajaia (GEO)	2
Oskar Marvik (NOR)	1
Yasmani Acosta (CHI)	1

== Final standing ==
Rank	Athlete
1st place, gold medalist(s)	Ali Akbar Yousefi (IRI)
2nd place, silver medalist(s)	Zurabi Gedekhauri (RWF)
3rd place, bronze medalist(s)	Iakobi Kajaia (GEO)
3rd place, bronze medalist(s)	Oskar Marvik (NOR)
5	Osman Yıldırım (TUR)
5	Yasmani Acosta (CHI)
7	Alin Alexuc-Ciurariu (ROU)
8	Beka Kandelaki (AZE)
9	Radoslav Georgiev (BUL)
10	Mykola Kuchmii (UKR)
11	David Ovasapyan (ARM)
12	Jello Krahmer (GER)
13	Mantas Knystautas (LTU)
14	Cohlton Schultz (USA)
15	Rafał Krajewski (POL)
16	Arata Sonoda (JPN)
17	Konsta Mäenpää (FIN)
18	Marko Koščević (CRO)
19	Lee Seung-chan (KOR)
20	Alimkhan Syzdykov (KAZ)
21	Štěpán David (CZE)
22	Sonu Sharma (IND)
