= 2024 World Wrestling Olympic Qualification Tournament =

- Venue: Başakşehir Youth and Sports Facility
- Location: Istanbul, Turkey
- Dates: 9–12 May 2024

The 2024 World Wrestling Olympic Qualification Tournament was the last qualifying tournament for the 2024 Summer Olympics. The event was held from 9 to 12 May 2024, in Istanbul, Turkey. Israeli wrestlers did not travel to Istanbul due to security concerns. The tournament awarded three quota places per weight category, one for each of the two highest-ranked wrestlers and one for the winner of the match between the two bronze medalists.

== Men's freestyle ==
=== 57 kg ===
11–12 May

Round of 32
Ben Hachem Tarik (MAR)	0–10	Spencer Lee (USA)
Pedro Mejías (VEN)	2–6	Vladimir Egorov (MKD)
Leung Tsz Shing (HKG)	0–10	Thomas Epp (SUI)
Rakhat Kalzhan (KAZ)	10–0	Käbe Mätjanow (TKM)
Alireza Sarlak (IRI)	4–2	Simone Piroddu (ITA)
Horst Lehr (GER)	11–0	Ilman Mukhtarov (FRA)
Han Chong-song (PRK)	WO	~~Peter Hammer (CRC)~~
Guesseppe Rea (ECU)	6–9	Ibrahim Bunduka (SLE)
Zandanbudyn Zanabazar (MGL)	WO	Levan Metreveli (ESP)
Andriy Yatsenko (UKR)	11–0	Darthe Capellan (CAN)
Georgi Vangelov (BUL)	7–7	Kim Sung-gwon (KOR)

Round of 16
Zou Wanhao (CHN)	9
Spencer Lee (USA)	10
Vladimir Egorov (MKD)	8
Thomas Epp (SUI)	0
Răzvan Kovacs (ROU)	0
Rakhat Kalzhan (KAZ)	10
Alireza Sarlak (IRI)	9
Roberti Dingashvili (GEO)	3
Muhammet Karavuş (TUR)	7
Horst Lehr (GER)	9^{F}
Han Chong-song (PRK)	10
Ibrahim Bunduka (SLE)	0
Zandanbudyn Zanabazar (MGL)	4
Andriy Yatsenko (UKR)	8
Georgi Vangelov (BUL)	4
Aman Sehrawat (IND)	10

Quarterfinals
Spencer Lee (USA)	12
Vladimir Egorov (MKD)	2
Rakhat Kalzhan (KAZ)	7
Alireza Sarlak (IRI)	2
Horst Lehr (GER)	4
Han Chong-song (PRK)	16
Andriy Yatsenko (UKR)	2
Aman Sehrawat (IND)	12

Semifinals
Spencer Lee (USA)	10
Rakhat Kalzhan (KAZ)	0
Han Chong-song (PRK)	2
Aman Sehrawat (IND)	12

Olympic wrestle-off
Zou Wanhao (CHN)	5
Andriy Yatsenko (UKR)	1

Repechage round 1
~~Ben Hachem Tarik (MAR)~~
Zou Wanhao (CHN)	WO

Repechage round 2
Zou Wanhao (CHN)	7
Vladimir Egorov (MKD)	0^{R}
Georgi Vangelov (BUL)	4
Andriy Yatsenko (UKR)	6

Bronze medals
Zou Wanhao (CHN)	8
Rakhat Kalzhan (KAZ)	6
Andriy Yatsenko (UKR)	7
Han Chong-song (PRK)	5

=== 65 kg ===
11–12 May

Round of 64
Niurgun Skriabin (AIN)	8–0 Fall	Cristian Nicolescu (PLW)
Besir Alili (MKD)	0–11	Ahmet Duman (TUR)
Krzysztof Bieńkowski (POL)	1–8	Erik Arushanian (UKR)
Ștefan Coman (ROU)	2–9 Fall	Zain Retherford (USA)
Shannon Hanna (BAH)	10–0	Lowe Bingham (NRU)

Round of 32
Maxim Saculțan (MDA)	11–0	Josh Failauga (ASA)
Kim Kwang-jin (PRK)	11–1	Josh Kramer (ECU)
Niurgun Skriabin (AIN)	0–9	Islam Dudaev (ALB)
Kizhan Clarke (GER)	3–9	Adlan Askarov (KAZ)
Mikyay Naim (BUL)	WO	~~Gibriel Chow (GAM)~~
Ayub Musaev (BEL)	3–8	Ahmet Duman (TUR)
Erik Arushanian (UKR)	17–16 Fall	Yuan Shaohua (CHN)
Jelaletdin Seýidow (TKM)	0–11	Khamzat Arsamerzouev (FRA)
Abdulmazhid Kudiev (TJK)	10–0	Muhammad Abdullah (PAK)
Davies Oriwa (KEN)	WO	~~Anthony Wesley (CPV)~~
Zain Retherford (USA)	11–0	Ibrahim Guzan (YEM)
Tömör-Ochiryn Tulga (MGL)	10–0	Alibeg Alibegov (BRN)
Sujeet Kalkal (IND)	3–2	Umidjon Jalolov (UZB)
Yun Jun-sik (KOR)	4–3	Shannon Hanna (BAH)
Heung Tsz Hei (HKG)	0–10	Lachlan McNeil (CAN)
Sahid Kargbo (SLE)	11–8	Nino Leutert (SUI)

Round of 16
Maxim Saculțan (MDA)	4
Kim Kwang-jin (PRK)	12
Islam Dudaev (ALB)	8
Adlan Askarov (KAZ)	6
Mikyay Naim (BUL)	7
Ahmet Duman (TUR)	8
Erik Arushanian (UKR)	5
Khamzat Arsamerzouev (FRA)	4
Abdulmazhid Kudiev (TJK)	12
Davies Oriwa (KEN)	0
Zain Retherford (USA)	2
Tömör-Ochiryn Tulga (MGL)	7
Sujeet Kalkal (IND)	10
Yun Jun-sik (KOR)	0
Lachlan McNeil (CAN)	16
Sahid Kargbo (SLE)	12

Quarterfinals
Kim Kwang-jin (PRK)	2
Islam Dudaev (ALB)	2
Ahmet Duman (TUR)	5
Erik Arushanian (UKR)	7
Abdulmazhid Kudiev (TJK)	0
Tömör-Ochiryn Tulga (MGL)	9
Sujeet Kalkal (IND)	10
Lachlan McNeil (CAN)	0

Semifinals
Islam Dudaev (ALB)	12
Erik Arushanian (UKR)	2
Tömör-Ochiryn Tulga (MGL)	6
Sujeet Kalkal (IND)	1

Olympic wrestle-off
Niurgun Skriabin (AIN)	0
Zain Retherford (USA)	7

Repechage round 2
Niurgun Skriabin (AIN)	4
Adlan Askarov (KAZ)	3
Alibeg Alibegov (BRN)	2
Zain Retherford (USA)	12^{F}

Repechage round 3
Niurgun Skriabin (AIN)	3
Kim Kwang-jin (PRK)	1
Zain Retherford (USA)	5
Abdulmazhid Kudiev (TJK)	2

Bronze medals
Niurgun Skriabin (AIN)	10
Erik Arushanian (UKR)	0
Zain Retherford (USA)	2
Sujeet Kalkal (IND)	2

=== 74 kg ===
11–12 May

Round of 64
Shamil Ustaev (GER)	0–7	Hrayr Alikhanyan (ARM)
Stone Lewis (CAN)	0–12	Vadym Tsurkan (UKR)
Zurab Kapraev (ROU)	4–0	Erik Reinbok (EST)
Gong Byung-min (KOR)	2–6	Vasile Diacon (MDA)

Round of 32
Lu Feng (CHN)	8–10	Frank Chamizo (ITA)
Orozobek Toktomambetov (KGZ)	5–3	Ramazan Ramazanov (BUL)
Hrayr Alikhanyan (ARM)	0–10	Chermen Valiev (ALB)
Mathayo Mahabila (KEN)	0–10	Avtandil Kentchadze (GEO)
Raúl Palacios (MEX)	0–10	Sonny Santiago (PUR)
Rasul Shapiev (MKD)	3–4 Fall	Vadym Tsurkan (UKR)
Viktor Rassadin (TJK)	4–1	Nurkozha Kaipanov (KAZ)
Zelimkhan Khadjiev (FRA)	4–0 Fall	Murad Kuramagomedov (HUN)
Soner Demirtaş (TUR)	10–0	Kamil Rybicki (POL)
Mohammad Mottaghinia (ESP)	16–6	Luis Barrios (HON)
Zurab Kapraev (ROU)	1–9	Khidir Saipudinov (BRN)
Olonbayaryn Süldkhüü (MGL)	3–0	Ibragim Veliev (BEL)
Simon Marchl (AUT)	8–0 Fall	Egzon Xhoni (KOS)
Jaideep Narwal (IND)	5–3	Vasile Diacon (MDA)
Malik Amine (SMR)	9–11	Tobias Portmann (SUI)
Arslan Amanmyradow (TKM)	0–11	Tajmuraz Salkazanov (SVK)

Round of 16
Frank Chamizo (ITA)	3
Orozobek Toktomambetov (KGZ)	1
Chermen Valiev (ALB)	5
Avtandil Kentchadze (GEO)	4
Sonny Santiago (PUR)	2
Vadym Tsurkan (UKR)	5
Viktor Rassadin (TJK)	6
Zelimkhan Khadjiev (FRA)	5
Soner Demirtaş (TUR)	5
Mohammad Mottaghinia (ESP)	2
Khidir Saipudinov (BRN)	6^{F}
Olonbayaryn Süldkhüü (MGL)	4
Simon Marchl (AUT)	0
Jaideep Narwal (IND)	11
Tobias Portmann (SUI)	0
Tajmuraz Salkazanov (SVK)	10

Quarterfinals
Frank Chamizo (ITA)	5
Chermen Valiev (ALB)	5
Vadym Tsurkan (UKR)	0
Viktor Rassadin (TJK)	2
Soner Demirtaş (TUR)	6
Khidir Saipudinov (BRN)	4
Jaideep Narwal (IND)	0
Tajmuraz Salkazanov (SVK)	3

Semifinals
Chermen Valiev (ALB)	2
Viktor Rassadin (TJK)	3
Soner Demirtaş (TUR)	2
Tajmuraz Salkazanov (SVK)	4

Olympic wrestle-off
Chermen Valiev (ALB)	4
Soner Demirtaş (TUR)	2

Repechage round 2
Nurkozha Kaipanov (KAZ)	11
Zelimkhan Khadjiev (FRA)	0
Arslan Amanmyradow (TKM)	11
Tobias Portmann (SUI)	1

Repechage round 3
Nurkozha Kaipanov (KAZ)	10
Vadym Tsurkan (UKR)	0
Arslan Amanmyradow (TKM)	0
Jaideep Narwal (IND)	11

Bronze medals
Nurkozha Kaipanov (KAZ)	3
Chermen Valiev (ALB)	4
Jaideep Narwal (IND)	1
Soner Demirtaş (TUR)	2

=== 86 kg ===
11–12 May

Round of 32
Osman Göçen (TUR)	8–2	Atai Izabekov (KGZ)
Dauren Kurugliev (GRE)	4–0	Boris Makoev (SVK)
Kim Gwan-uk (KOR)	8–1	Mushegh Mkrtchyan (ARM)
Sebastian Jezierzański (POL)	6–3	Rakhim Magamadov (FRA)
Patrik Püspöki (HUN)	4–2 Fall	Arkadzi Pahasian (AIN)
Deepak Punia (IND)	4–6	Lin Zushen (CHN)
Vasyl Mykhailov (UKR)	4–0	Aimar Andruse (EST)
Noel Torres (MEX)	5–3	Benjamin Greil (AUT)
Magomed Ramazanov (BUL)	10–0	Ivars Samušonoks (LAT)
Taimuraz Friev (ESP)	2–3	Georgii Rubaev (MDA)
Saad Amandar (MAR)	0–10	Pedro Gonçalves (BRA)
Aron Caneva (ITA)	5–1	Pool Ambrocio (PER)
Vladimeri Gamkrelidze (GEO)	9–1	Stefan Reichmuth (SUI)
Ariston Bartley (ASA)	10–0	Yeung Yip Cheuk (HKG)
Döwletmyrat Orazgylyjow (TKM)	9–10	Lars Schäfle (GER)
Ahmad Magomedov (MKD)	WO	~~Magomed Sharipov (BRN)~~

Round of 16
Osman Göçen (TUR)	0
Dauren Kurugliev (GRE)	6^{F}
Kim Gwan-uk (KOR)	0
Sebastian Jezierzański (POL)	6
Patrik Püspöki (HUN)	0
Lin Zushen (CHN)	10
Vasyl Mykhailov (UKR)	4
Noel Torres (MEX)	0
Magomed Ramazanov (BUL)	10
Georgii Rubaev (MDA)	0
Pedro Gonçalves (BRA)	2
Aron Caneva (ITA)	12
Vladimeri Gamkrelidze (GEO)	10
Ariston Bartley (ASA)	0
Lars Schäfle (GER)	6
Ahmad Magomedov (MKD)	4

Quarterfinals
Dauren Kurugliev (GRE)	3
Sebastian Jezierzański (POL)	0
Lin Zushen (CHN)	3
Vasyl Mykhailov (UKR)	6
Magomed Ramazanov (BUL)	10
Aron Caneva (ITA)	0
Vladimeri Gamkrelidze (GEO)	7
Lars Schäfle (GER)	2

Semifinals
Dauren Kurugliev (GRE)	3
Vasyl Mykhailov (UKR)	0
Magomed Ramazanov (BUL)	5
Vladimeri Gamkrelidze (GEO)	3

Olympic wrestle-off
Vasyl Mykhailov (UKR)	2
Vladimeri Gamkrelidze (GEO)	8

Repechage round 1
Boris Makoev (SVK)	3
Osman Göçen (TUR)	5
Ivars Samušonoks (LAT)	0
Georgii Rubaev (MDA)	2^{F}

Repechage round 2
Osman Göçen (TUR)	7
Sebastian Jezierzański (POL)	8
Georgii Rubaev (MDA)	7
Aron Caneva (ITA)	2

Bronze medals
Sebastian Jezierzański (POL)	1
Vasyl Mykhailov (UKR)	3
Georgii Rubaev (MDA)	2
Vladimeri Gamkrelidze (GEO)	9

=== 97 kg ===
11–12 May

Round of 32
Magomedgaji Nurov (MKD)	5–1	Deepak Nehra (IND)
Adlan Viskhanov (FRA)	0–11	Magomed Ibragimov (UZB)
Seo Ju-hwan (KOR)	0–2	Ganbaataryn Gankhuyag (MGL)
Cristian Sarco (VEN)	1–10	Radu Lefter (MDA)
Nishan Randhawa (CAN)	1–11	Arash Yoshida (JPN)
Murazi Mchedlidze (UKR)	10–0	Adam Jakšík (SVK)
Sergey Sargsyan (ARM)	0–11	Habila Awusayiman (CHN)
Thomas Barns (AUS)	7–18	Maxwell Lacey (CRC)
Ben Honis (ITA)	6–4	Samuel Scherrer (SUI)
~~Babacarr Mboge (GAM)~~	WO	Şatlyk Hemelýäýew (TKM)

Round of 16
Erik Thiele (GER)	1
Magomedgaji Nurov (MKD)	1
Magomed Ibragimov (UZB)	2
Ganbaataryn Gankhuyag (MGL)	1
Theodoros Kyriakidis (GRE)	3
Radu Lefter (MDA)	13
Arash Yoshida (JPN)	3
Akhmed Bataev (BUL)	4
Vladislav Baitsaev (HUN)	6
Murazi Mchedlidze (UKR)	4
Habila Awusayiman (CHN)	13
Florin Tripon (ROU)	2
Maxwell Lacey (CRC)	0
Ben Honis (ITA)	10
Şatlyk Hemelýäýew (TKM)	3
Zbigniew Baranowski (POL)	14

Quarterfinals
Erik Thiele (GER)	3
Magomed Ibragimov (UZB)	2
Radu Lefter (MDA)	8
Akhmed Bataev (BUL)	7
Vladislav Baitsaev (HUN)	1
Habila Awusayiman (CHN)	6
Ben Honis (ITA)	2
Zbigniew Baranowski (POL)	4

Semifinals
Erik Thiele (GER)	3
Radu Lefter (MDA)	0
Habila Awusayiman (CHN)	2
Zbigniew Baranowski (POL)	2

Olympic wrestle-off
Magomed Ibragimov (UZB)	1
Habila Awusayiman (CHN)	2

Repechage round 2
Magomedgaji Nurov (MKD)	2
Magomed Ibragimov (UZB)	3
Şatlyk Hemelýäýew (TKM)	0
Ben Honis (ITA)	11

Bronze medals
Magomed Ibragimov (UZB)	2^{F}
Radu Lefter (MDA)	2
Ben Honis (ITA)	0
Habila Awusayiman (CHN)	11

=== 125 kg ===
11–12 May

Round of 32
Joel Tukai (KEN)	0–10	Johannes Ludescher (AUT)
Paris Karepi (ALB)	0–3	Khasanboy Rakhimov (UZB)
Sumit Malik (IND)	2–2	Aaron Johnson (JAM)
Gennadij Cudinovic (GER)	0–11	Lyova Gevorgyan (ARM)
Gino Ávila (HON)	0–10	Shamil Sharipov (BRN)
José Daniel Díaz (VEN)	6–2	Jung Yei-hyun (KOR)

Round of 16
Dániel Ligeti (HUN)	12
Georgi Ivanov (BUL)	1
Johannes Ludescher (AUT)	1
Zyýamuhammet Saparow (TKM)	6
Taiki Yamamoto (JPN)	1
Khasanboy Rakhimov (UZB)	7
Aaron Johnson (JAM)	0
Aiaal Lazarev (KGZ)	10
Deng Zhiwei (CHN)	4
Lyova Gevorgyan (ARM)	0
Shamil Sharipov (BRN)	5
Oleksandr Khotsianivskyi (UKR)	2
Abraham Conyedo (ITA)	1
José Daniel Díaz (VEN)	4
José Cuba (ESP)	2
Robert Baran (POL)	12

Quarterfinals
Dániel Ligeti (HUN)	4
Zyýamuhammet Saparow (TKM)	0
Khasanboy Rakhimov (UZB)	2
Aiaal Lazarev (KGZ)	11^{F}
Deng Zhiwei (CHN)	3
Shamil Sharipov (BRN)	0
José Daniel Díaz (VEN)	2
Robert Baran (POL)	2

Semifinals
Dániel Ligeti (HUN)	2
Aiaal Lazarev (KGZ)	12
Deng Zhiwei (CHN)	4
José Daniel Díaz (VEN)	0

Olympic wrestle-off
Dániel Ligeti (HUN)	5^{F}
José Daniel Díaz (VEN)	0

Repechage round 2
Aaron Johnson (JAM)	0
Khasanboy Rakhimov (UZB)	11
Lyova Gevorgyan (ARM)	1
Shamil Sharipov (BRN)	3

Bronze medals
Khasanboy Rakhimov (UZB)	2
Dániel Ligeti (HUN)	5
Shamil Sharipov (BRN)	0
José Daniel Díaz (VEN)	3

== Men's Greco-Roman ==
=== 60 kg ===
9–10 May

Round of 32
Alexis Rodríguez (MEX)	0–9	Kim Da-hyun (KOR)
Dalton Roberts (USA)	6–11	Viktor Petryk (UKR)
Alexander Bica (SWE)	9–0	Daniel Bobillo (ESP)
Romio Goliath (NAM)	14–4 Fall	Bajram Sina (ALB)
Georgii Tibilov (SRB)	10–1	Hleb Makaranka (AIN)
Batkhuyagiin Mönkh-Erdene (MGL)	10–0	Ibrahim Bunduka (SLE)
Michał Tracz (POL)	WO	~~Josh Failauga (ASA)~~
Nikolai Mohammadi (DEN)	1–4	Christopher Kraemer (GER)
Murad Mammadov (AZE)	10–1	Aleksandrs Jurkjans (LAT)
Sumit Dalal (IND)	0–10	Răzvan Arnăut (ROU)
Ismail Et-Talibi (MAR)	1–1	Umit Durdyýew (TKM)
Justas Petravičius (LTU)	8–0	Nedyalko Petrov (BUL)

Round of 16
Gevorg Gharibyan (ARM)	1
Kim Da-hyun (KOR)	8
Viktor Petryk (UKR)	0
Alexander Bica (SWE)	7^{F}
Romio Goliath (NAM)	0
Georgii Tibilov (SRB)	8
Batkhuyagiin Mönkh-Erdene (MGL)	0
Sadyk Lalaev (AIN)	9
Pridon Abuladze (GEO)	5
Michał Tracz (POL)	6
Christopher Kraemer (GER)	1
Murad Mammadov (AZE)	10
Răzvan Arnăut (ROU)	8
Ismail Et-Talibi (MAR)	0
Justas Petravičius (LTU)	10
Léo Tudezca (FRA)	0

Quarterfinals
Kim Da-hyun (KOR)	10
Alexander Bica (SWE)	0
Georgii Tibilov (SRB)	2
Sadyk Lalaev (AIN)	6
Michał Tracz (POL)	1
Murad Mammadov (AZE)	5
Răzvan Arnăut (ROU)	6
Justas Petravičius (LTU)	6

Semifinals
Kim Da-hyun (KOR)	0
Sadyk Lalaev (AIN)	8
Murad Mammadov (AZE)	8
Răzvan Arnăut (ROU)	2

Olympic wrestle-off
Georgii Tibilov (SRB)	5
Răzvan Arnăut (ROU)	2

Repechage round 1
Aleksandrs Jurkjans (LAT)	6
Christopher Kraemer (GER)	6

Repechage round 2
Batkhuyagiin Mönkh-Erdene (MGL)	1
Georgii Tibilov (SRB)	11
Aleksandrs Jurkjans (LAT)	1
Michał Tracz (POL)	3

Bronze medals
Georgii Tibilov (SRB)	8
Kim Da-hyun (KOR)	1
Michał Tracz (POL)	0
Răzvan Arnăut (ROU)	4

=== 67 kg ===
9–10 May

Round of 32
Ashu Bazard (IND)	5–4	Håvard Jørgensen (NOR)
Etienne Kinsinger (GER)	9–0	Nilton Soto (PER)
Andrea Setti (ITA)	1–1	Artur Jeremejev (EST)
Ellis Coleman (USA)	1–1	Aliaksandr Liavonchyk (AIN)
Andreas Vetsch (SUI)	10–1	Gjete Prenga (ALB)
Dominik Etlinger (CRO)	3–7	Valentin Petic (MDA)
Mohamed Ibrahim El-Sayed (EGY)	9–8	Abu Muslim Amaev (BUL)
Mihai Mihuț (ROU)	9–0	Begmyrat Nobatow (TKM)
Makhmud Bakhshilloev (UZB)	0–5 Fall	Dinmukhamed Koshkar (KAZ)
Aslan Visaitov (AIN)	1–2	Ramaz Zoidze (GEO)
Niklas Öhlén (SWE)	9–0	Sahid Kargbo (SLE)
Ro Yong-jin (PRK)	3–2	Selçuk Can (TUR)
Mateusz Bernatek (POL)	9–1	Ahmed Barahmah (KSA)
Ryu Han-su (KOR)	1–1	Matias Lipasti (FIN)
Adomas Grigaliūnas (LTU)	0–8	Li Lei (CHN)

Round of 16
István Váncza (HUN)	10
Ashu Bazard (IND)	0
Etienne Kinsinger (GER)	3
Artur Jeremejev (EST)	1
Ellis Coleman (USA)	1
Andreas Vetsch (SUI)	8
Valentin Petic (MDA)	4
Mohamed Ibrahim El-Sayed (EGY)	1
Mihai Mihuț (ROU)	4
Dinmukhamed Koshkar (KAZ)	3^{F}
Ramaz Zoidze (GEO)	5
Niklas Öhlén (SWE)	0
Ro Yong-jin (PRK)	1
Mateusz Bernatek (POL)	4
Matias Lipasti (FIN)	3
Li Lei (CHN)	3

Quarterfinals
István Váncza (HUN)	1
Etienne Kinsinger (GER)	2
Andreas Vetsch (SUI)	1
Valentin Petic (MDA)	4
Dinmukhamed Koshkar (KAZ)	4
Ramaz Zoidze (GEO)	9
Mateusz Bernatek (POL)	5
Li Lei (CHN)	10

Semifinals
Etienne Kinsinger (GER)	1
Valentin Petic (MDA)	3
Ramaz Zoidze (GEO)	10
Li Lei (CHN)	0

Olympic wrestle-off
Mohamed Ibrahim El-Sayed (EGY)	8
Dinmukhamed Koshkar (KAZ)	0

Repechage round 1
Dominik Etlinger (CRO)
Mohamed Ibrahim El-Sayed (EGY)	WO
Aslan Visaitov (AIN)	4
Niklas Öhlén (SWE)	1

Repechage round 2
Mohamed Ibrahim El-Sayed (EGY)	9
Andreas Vetsch (SUI)	0
Aslan Visaitov (AIN)	3
Dinmukhamed Koshkar (KAZ)	3

Bronze medals
Mohamed Ibrahim El-Sayed (EGY)	8
Etienne Kinsinger (GER)	0
Dinmukhamed Koshkar (KAZ)	10
Li Lei (CHN)	0

- Ashu Bazard of India originally finished 17th, but got disqualified.

=== 77 kg ===
9–10 May

Round of 64
Lee Do-won (KOR)	3–5 Fall	Georgios Prevolarakis (GRE)

Round of 32
Alexandrin Guțu (MDA)	0–8	Idris Ibaev (GER)
Kevin Kupi (ALB)	8–0	Jon Viruet (PUR)
Georgios Prevolarakis (GRE)	0–11	Liu Rui (CHN)
Per-Anders Kure (NOR)	1–2	Fabio Dietsche (SUI)
Hassan Barnawi (KSA)	0–6	Kamil Czarnecki (POL)
John Yeats (CAN)	1–10	Paulius Galkinas (LTU)
Aik Mnatsakanian (BUL)	3–1	Marcos Sánchez-Silva (ESP)
Volodymyr Yakovliev (UKR)	0–6	Zoltán Lévai (HUN)
Kamal Bey (USA)	0–8	Sergey Kutuzov (AIN)
Tsimur Berdyieu (AIN)	9–0	Joílson Júnior (BRA)
Oldřich Varga (CZE)	9–0	Bazargeldi Ezimow (TKM)
Emmanuel Benítez (MEX)	2–7	Albin Olofsson (SWE)
Antonio Kamenjašević (CRO)	7–1	Johnny Bur (FRA)
Ilie Cojocari (ROU)	1–1	Viktor Nemeš (SRB)
Vikas Dalal (IND)	4–0	Riccardo Abbrescia (ITA)
Oliver Krüger (DEN)	0–3	Iuri Lomadze (GEO)

Round of 16
Idris Ibaev (GER)	2^{F}
Kevin Kupi (ALB)	0
Liu Rui (CHN)	10
Fabio Dietsche (SUI)	0
Kamil Czarnecki (POL)	1
Paulius Galkinas (LTU)	3
Aik Mnatsakanian (BUL)	2
Zoltán Lévai (HUN)	1
Sergey Kutuzov (AIN)	8
Tsimur Berdyieu (AIN)	0
Oldřich Varga (CZE)	1
Albin Olofsson (SWE)	3
Antonio Kamenjašević (CRO)	0
Viktor Nemeš (SRB)	4
Vikas Dalal (IND)	0
Iuri Lomadze (GEO)	8

Quarterfinals
Idris Ibaev (GER)	5
Liu Rui (CHN)	5
Paulius Galkinas (LTU)	1
Aik Mnatsakanian (BUL)	1
Sergey Kutuzov (AIN)	8
Albin Olofsson (SWE)	2
Viktor Nemeš (SRB)	1
Iuri Lomadze (GEO)	10

Semifinals
Liu Rui (CHN)	1
Aik Mnatsakanian (BUL)	1
Sergey Kutuzov (AIN)	5
Iuri Lomadze (GEO)	2

Olympic wrestle-off
Zoltán Lévai (HUN)	3
Kamal Bey (USA)	0

Repechage round 2
Marcos Sánchez-Silva (ESP)	0
Zoltán Lévai (HUN)	9
Kamal Bey (USA)	9
Tsimur Berdyieu (AIN)	1

Repechage round 3
Zoltán Lévai (HUN)	3
Paulius Galkinas (LTU)	1
Kamal Bey (USA)	7
Albin Olofsson (SWE)	1

Bronze medals
Zoltán Lévai (HUN)	2
Liu Rui (CHN)	1
Kamal Bey (USA)	5
Iuri Lomadze (GEO)	4

=== 87 kg ===
9–10 May

Round of 32
Arkadiusz Kułynycz (POL)	7–1	So Sakabe (JPN)
Nicu Ojog (ROU)	10–1	Elias Vaoifi (ASA)
Damian von Euw (SUI)	8–0	Ioannis Narlidis (CAN)
Lukas Staudacher (AUT)	0–9	Turpal Bisultanov (DEN)
Martynas Nemsevičius (LTU)	5–1	Raido Liitmäe (EST)
Exauce Mukubu (NOR)	0–4	Ivan Huklek (CRO)
Yhlas Abdurazakow (TKM)	0–8	Park Sang-hyeok (KOR)
Daniel Grégorich (CUB)	1–1	Lasha Gobadze (GEO)
Mirco Minguzzi (ITA)	0–10	Gevorg Tadevosyan (ARM)
Azat Salidinov (KGZ)	1–7	Mihail Bradu (MDA)
Waltteri Latvala (FIN)	1–9	Marcel Sterkenburg (NED)
Rafig Huseynov (AZE)	3–1	Ilias Pagkalidis (GRE)
José Andrés Vargas (MEX)	1–3	Sunil Kumar (IND)
Hannes Wagner (GER)	1–5	Jalgasbay Berdimuratov (UZB)

Round of 16
Kiryl Maskevich (AIN)	3^{F}
Arkadiusz Kułynycz (POL)	1
Nicu Ojog (ROU)	3^{F}
Damian von Euw (SUI)	1
Turpal Bisultanov (DEN)	9
Martynas Nemsevičius (LTU)	0
Ivan Huklek (CRO)	7
Park Sang-hyeok (KOR)	0
Lasha Gobadze (GEO)	5
Gevorg Tadevosyan (ARM)	4
Mihail Bradu (MDA)	2
Marcel Sterkenburg (NED)	3
Rafig Huseynov (AZE)	4
Sunil Kumar (IND)	3
Jalgasbay Berdimuratov (UZB)	4
Alex Kessidis (SWE)	5

Quarterfinals
Kiryl Maskevich (AIN)	7
Nicu Ojog (ROU)	1
Turpal Bisultanov (DEN)	3
Ivan Huklek (CRO)	2
Lasha Gobadze (GEO)	3
Marcel Sterkenburg (NED)	3
Rafig Huseynov (AZE)	2
Alex Kessidis (SWE)	1

Semifinals
Kiryl Maskevich (AIN)	5
Turpal Bisultanov (DEN)	2
Lasha Gobadze (GEO)	1
Rafig Huseynov (AZE)	4

Olympic wrestle-off
Arkadiusz Kułynycz (POL)	3
Lasha Gobadze (GEO)	2

Repechage round 1
Ilias Pagkalidis (GRE)	3
Sunil Kumar (IND)	10

Repechage round 2
Arkadiusz Kułynycz (POL)	3
Nicu Ojog (ROU)	1
Sunil Kumar (IND)	4
Alex Kessidis (SWE)	9

Bronze medals
Arkadiusz Kułynycz (POL)	6
Turpal Bisultanov (DEN)	5
Alex Kessidis (SWE)	3
Lasha Gobadze (GEO)	3

=== 97 kg ===
9–10 May

Round of 32
Kaloyan Ivanov (BUL)	1–3	Uzur Dzhuzupbekov (KGZ)
Tadeusz Michalik (POL)	2–1 Fall	Nitesh Siwach (IND)
Amanberdi Agamämmedow (TKM)	0–9	Filip Smetko (CRO)
Yuri Nakazato (JPN)	3–1	Tyrone Sterkenburg (NED)
Murad Ahmadiyev (AZE)	1–1	Richard Karelson (EST)
Metehan Başar (TUR)	2–0	Li Yiming (CHN)
Vladlen Kozlyuk (UKR)	10–0	Baltmönkhiin Badamdorj (MGL)
Markus Ragginger (AUT)	1–7	Artur Sargsian (AIN)
Ibrahim Fallatah (KSA)	1–9	Ramon Betschart (SUI)
Mathias Bak (DEN)	8–0	Michail Iosifidis (GRE)
Lucas Lazogianis (GER)	6–1	Iussuf Matsiyev (KAZ)
Alex Szőke (HUN)	10–1	Nikoloz Kakhelashvili (ITA)

Round of 16
Arvi Savolainen (FIN)	2
Uzur Dzhuzupbekov (KGZ)	0
Tadeusz Michalik (POL)	1
Filip Smetko (CRO)	3
Yuri Nakazato (JPN)	3
Murad Ahmadiyev (AZE)	1
Metehan Başar (TUR)	1
Felix Baldauf (NOR)	1
Aleksandar Stjepanetic (SWE)	1
Vladlen Kozlyuk (UKR)	7^{F}
Artur Sargsian (AIN)	8
Ramon Betschart (SUI)	0
Mathias Bak (DEN)	0
Lucas Lazogianis (GER)	9^{C}
Alex Szőke (HUN)	1
Mikheil Kajaia (SRB)	1

Quarterfinals
Arvi Savolainen (FIN)	9
Filip Smetko (CRO)	1
Yuri Nakazato (JPN)	6
Felix Baldauf (NOR)	0
Vladlen Kozlyuk (UKR)	1
Artur Sargsian (AIN)	2
Lucas Lazogianis (GER)	1
Mikheil Kajaia (SRB)	1

Semifinals
Arvi Savolainen (FIN)	4
Yuri Nakazato (JPN)	2
Artur Sargsian (AIN)	3
Lucas Lazogianis (GER)	1

Olympic wrestle-off
Uzur Dzhuzupbekov (KGZ)	8
Lucas Lazogianis (GER)	4

Repechage round 1
Markus Ragginger (AUT)	10
Ramon Betschart (SUI)	0

Repechage round 2
Uzur Dzhuzupbekov (KGZ)	12^{C}
Filip Smetko (CRO)	3
Markus Ragginger (AUT)	1
Vladlen Kozlyuk (UKR)	1

Bronze medals
Uzur Dzhuzupbekov (KGZ)	9
Yuri Nakazato (JPN)	0
Vladlen Kozlyuk (UKR)	1
Lucas Lazogianis (GER)	4^{F}

=== 130 kg ===
9–10 May

Round of 32
Pavel Hlinchuk (AIN)	9–8 Fall	Mykhailo Vyshnyvetskyi (UKR)
Sabah Shariati (AZE)	8–3	Nikolaos Ntounias (GRE)
Moisés Pérez (VEN)	2–5	Mantas Knystautas (LTU)
Naveen Sevlia (IND)	1–1	Daniel Gastl (AUT)
Dárius Vitek (HUN)	9–0	Boris Petrušić (SRB)

Round of 16
Iakobi Kajaia (GEO)	1
Elias Kuosmanen (FIN)	5
Pavel Hlinchuk (AIN)	7
Kamil Kościółek (POL)	1
Roman Kim (KGZ)	0
Sabah Shariati (AZE)	10
Mantas Knystautas (LTU)	2
David Ovasapyan (ARM)	0
Alin Alexuc-Ciurariu (ROU)	4
Eduard Babenoshev (TJK)	0
Daniel Gastl (AUT)	0
Sota Okumura (JPN)	2
Oskar Marvik (NOR)	4
Dárius Vitek (HUN)	2
Aýbegşazada Kürräýew (TKM)	0
Heiki Nabi (EST)	9

Quarterfinals
Elias Kuosmanen (FIN)	3
Pavel Hlinchuk (AIN)	13
Sabah Shariati (AZE)	1
Mantas Knystautas (LTU)	1
Alin Alexuc-Ciurariu (ROU)	8
Sota Okumura (JPN)	1
Oskar Marvik (NOR)	1
Heiki Nabi (EST)	5

Semifinals
Pavel Hlinchuk (AIN)	1
Sabah Shariati (AZE)	1
Alin Alexuc-Ciurariu (ROU)	1
Heiki Nabi (EST)	1

Olympic wrestle-off
Pavel Hlinchuk (AIN)	4
Heiki Nabi (EST)	2

Repechage round 1
Nikolaos Ntounias (GRE)	5
Roman Kim (KGZ)	1

Repechage round 2
Nikolaos Ntounias (GRE)	0
Mantas Knystautas (LTU)	9
Eduard Babenoshev (TJK)	1
Sota Okumura (JPN)	6^{C}

Bronze medals
Mantas Knystautas (LTU)	5
Pavel Hlinchuk (AIN)	6
Sota Okumura (JPN)	0
Heiki Nabi (EST)	10

- Iakobi Kajaia of Georgia originally finished 14th, but got disqualified for anti-doping violation.

== Women's freestyle ==
=== 50 kg ===
10–11 May

Round of 32
Hsieh Meng-hsuan (TPE)	10–0	Aintzane Gorría (ESP)
Viyaleta Chyryk (AIN)	10–8	Gabija Dilytė (LTU)
Nguyễn Thị Xuân (VIE)	5–0	Laura Ganikyzy (KAZ)
Julie Sabatié (FRA)	0–6	Kim Son-hyang (PRK)
Emanuela Liuzzi (ITA)	13–2	Nipuni Wasana (SRI)
Kamila Barbosa (BRA)	0–10	Anastasia Blayvas (GER)
Svenja Jungo (SUI)	2–12	Geneviève Morrison (CAN)
Anna Łukasiak (POL)	10–0	Marina Karapanagiotidou (GRE)

Round of 16
Mariya Stadnik (AZE)	11
Hsieh Meng-hsuan (TPE)	0
Viyaleta Chyryk (AIN)	5
Cheon Mi-ran (KOR)	2
Emma Wangila (KEN)	0
Nguyễn Thị Xuân (VIE)	10
Kim Son-hyang (PRK)	10
Miglena Selishka (BUL)	0
Jacqueline Mollocana (ECU)	2
Emanuela Liuzzi (ITA)	4
Anastasia Blayvas (GER)	4^{F}
Yorlenis Morán (PAN)	0
Mariana Díaz (MEX)
Geneviève Morrison (CAN)	WO
Anna Łukasiak (POL)	0
Mercy Genesis (NGR)	3

Quarterfinals
Mariya Stadnik (AZE)	11
Viyaleta Chyryk (AIN)	0
Nguyễn Thị Xuân (VIE)	0
Kim Son-hyang (PRK)	10
Emanuela Liuzzi (ITA)	1
Anastasia Blayvas (GER)	5
Geneviève Morrison (CAN)	1
Mercy Genesis (NGR)	8

Semifinals
Mariya Stadnik (AZE)	3
Kim Son-hyang (PRK)	10
Anastasia Blayvas (GER)	6
Mercy Genesis (NGR)	1

Olympic wrestle-off
Mariya Stadnik (AZE)	10
Emanuela Liuzzi (ITA)	0

Repechage round 1
Julie Sabatié (FRA)	2
Miglena Selishka (BUL)	6
Kamila Barbosa (BRA)	3
Yorlenis Morán (PAN)	5^{F}

Repechage round 2
Miglena Selishka (BUL)	9
Nguyễn Thị Xuân (VIE)	2
Yorlenis Morán (PAN)	1
Emanuela Liuzzi (ITA)	14^{F}

Bronze medals
Miglena Selishka (BUL)	0
Mariya Stadnik (AZE)	10
Emanuela Liuzzi (ITA)	3
Mercy Genesis (NGR)	3

=== 53 kg ===
10–11 May

Round of 32
Irena Binkova (BUL)	4–4 Fall	Zineb Ech-Chabki (MAR)
Laura Herin (CUB)	18–8	Gultakin Shirinova (AZE)
Fabiana Rinella (ITA)	0–5 Fall	Veronika Ryabovolova (MKD)
Oleksandra Kogut (AUT)	4–8	Mariana Drăguțan (MDA)
Yusneiry Agrazal (PAN)	0–10	Shokhida Akhmedova (UZB)
Zeynep Yetgil (TUR)	7–0	Victoria Báez (ESP)
Marina Sedneva (KAZ)	4–4 Fall	Zeltzin Hernández (MEX)
Jowita Wrzesień (POL)	3–1	Park Seo-young (KOR)
Nguyễn Thị Mỹ Trang (VIE)	0–5	Sabrina Tapajós (BRA)
Batkhuyagiin Khulan (MGL)	10–0	Nethmi Ahinsa (SRI)
Mariia Vynnyk (UKR)	0–4	Karla Godinez (CAN)

Round of 16
Sztalvira Orsós (HUN)	11
Irena Binkova (BUL)	0
Laura Herin (CUB)	10
Veronika Ryabovolova (MKD)	0
Aruuke Kadyrbek Kyzy (KGZ)	1
Mariana Drăguțan (MDA)	11
Shokhida Akhmedova (UZB)	6
Tatiana Debien (FRA)	3
Annika Wendle (GER)	2
Zeynep Yetgil (TUR)	3
Marina Sedneva (KAZ)	0
Jowita Wrzesień (POL)	7^{F}
Sabrina Tapajós (BRA)	0
Batkhuyagiin Khulan (MGL)	4^{F}
Karla Godinez (CAN)	5
Maria Prevolaraki (GRE)	6

Quarterfinals
Sztalvira Orsós (HUN)	5
Laura Herin (CUB)	4
Mariana Drăguțan (MDA)	9
Shokhida Akhmedova (UZB)	7
Zeynep Yetgil (TUR)	7
Jowita Wrzesień (POL)	0
Batkhuyagiin Khulan (MGL)	6
Maria Prevolaraki (GRE)	1

Semifinals
Sztalvira Orsós (HUN)	2
Mariana Drăguțan (MDA)	11^{F}
Zeynep Yetgil (TUR)	3
Batkhuyagiin Khulan (MGL)	8^{F}

Olympic wrestle-off
Shokhida Akhmedova (UZB)	0
Zeynep Yetgil (TUR)	10

Repechage round 1
Oleksandra Kogut (AUT)	5
Aruuke Kadyrbek Kyzy (KGZ)	0
Nethmi Ahinsa (SRI)	12
Sabrina Tapajós (BRA)	2

Repechage round 2
Oleksandra Kogut (AUT)	1
Shokhida Akhmedova (UZB)	6
Nethmi Ahinsa (SRI)	0
Maria Prevolaraki (GRE)	4^{F}

Bronze medals
Shokhida Akhmedova (UZB)	WO
Sztalvira Orsós (HUN)
Maria Prevolaraki (GRE)	0
Zeynep Yetgil (TUR)	10

=== 57 kg ===
10–11 May

Round of 32
Laura Almaganbetova (KAZ)	10–0	Kwon Young-jin (KOR)
Alina Hrushyna (UKR)	5–2 Fall	Jong In-sun (PRK)
Ramóna Galambos (HUN)	4–1	Alyona Kolesnik (AZE)
Boldsaikhan Khongorzul (MGL)	3–5	Olga Khoroshavtseva (AIN)
Aurora Russo (ITA)	6–0 Fall	Zineb Hassoune (MAR)
Sezim Zhumanazarova (KGZ)	WO	~~Othelie Høie (NOR)~~
Marija Cvetanova (MKD)	0–10	Evelina Hulthén (SWE)
Yaynelis Sanz (CUB)	7–4	Kateryna Zhydachevska (ROU)

Round of 16
Elvira Kamaloğlu (TUR)	4^{F}
Laura Almaganbetova (KAZ)	2
Alina Hrushyna (UKR)	7^{F}
Graciela Sánchez (ESP)	0
Mathilde Rivière (FRA)	2
Ramóna Galambos (HUN)	5
Olga Khoroshavtseva (AIN)	7
Alma Valencia (MEX)	1
Giullia Penalber (BRA)	4^{F}
Aurora Russo (ITA)	0
Sezim Zhumanazarova (KGZ)	10
Ester Abraham (NAM)	0
Laylokhon Sobirova (UZB)	4
Evelina Hulthén (SWE)	2
Yaynelis Sanz (CUB)	15
Evelina Nikolova (BUL)	4

Quarterfinals
Elvira Kamaloğlu (TUR)	4
Alina Hrushyna (UKR)	10
Ramóna Galambos (HUN)	2
Olga Khoroshavtseva (AIN)	4
Giullia Penalber (BRA)	12^{F}
Sezim Zhumanazarova (KGZ)	0
Laylokhon Sobirova (UZB)	2^{F}
Yaynelis Sanz (CUB)	6

Semifinals
Alina Hrushyna (UKR)	5
Olga Khoroshavtseva (AIN)	5
Giullia Penalber (BRA)	7
Laylokhon Sobirova (UZB)	5

Olympic wrestle-off
Alina Hrushyna (UKR)	4
Aurora Russo (ITA)	3^{C}

Repechage round 1
Boldsaikhan Khongorzul (MGL)	13
Alma Valencia (MEX)	2

Repechage round 2
Boldsaikhan Khongorzul (MGL)	4^{F}
Ramóna Galambos (HUN)	2
Aurora Russo (ITA)	7
Sezim Zhumanazarova (KGZ)	6

Bronze medals
Boldsaikhan Khongorzul (MGL)	0
Alina Hrushyna (UKR)	10
Aurora Russo (ITA)	8
Laylokhon Sobirova (UZB)	2

=== 62 kg ===
10–11 May

Round of 32
Melanie Jiménez (MEX)	6–3	Lydia Pérez (ESP)
Ruzanna Mammadova (AZE)	4–0 Fall	Anastasija Grigorjeva (LAT)
Améline Douarre (FRA)	1–6	Nesrin Baş (TUR)
Elena Esposito (ITA)	7–4	Arian Carpio (PHI)

Round of 16
Veranika Ivanova (AIN)	4^{F}
Mansi Ahlawat (IND)	0
Melanie Jiménez (MEX)	13
Irina Kuznetsova (KAZ)	8
Long Jia (CHN)	7
Ruzanna Mammadova (AZE)	1
Nachi Masuda (AUS)	1
Kriszta Incze (ROU)	5^{F}
Laís Nunes (BRA)	0
Johanna Lindborg (SWE)	5^{F}
Nesrin Baş (TUR)	6
Natalia Kubaty (POL)	4
Astrid Montero (VEN)	12
Elena Esposito (ITA)	2
Annatina Lippuner (SUI)	5
Mariana Cherdivara (MDA)	8

Quarterfinals
Veranika Ivanova (AIN)	10
Melanie Jiménez (MEX)	0
Long Jia (CHN)	6
Kriszta Incze (ROU)	9
Johanna Lindborg (SWE)	4
Nesrin Baş (TUR)	4
Astrid Montero (VEN)	4
Mariana Cherdivara (MDA)	0

Semifinals
Veranika Ivanova (AIN)	1
Kriszta Incze (ROU)	6
Nesrin Baş (TUR)	10
Astrid Montero (VEN)	6

Olympic wrestle-off
Veranika Ivanova (AIN)	10
Johanna Lindborg (SWE)	0

Repechage round 1
Améline Douarre (FRA)	3
Natalia Kubaty (POL)	0

Repechage round 2
Nachi Masuda (AUS)	1
Long Jia (CHN)	9
Améline Douarre (FRA)	0
Johanna Lindborg (SWE)	5^{F}

Bronze medals
Long Jia (CHN)	0
Veranika Ivanova (AIN)	6^{F}
Johanna Lindborg (SWE)	11^{F}
Astrid Montero (VEN)	2

=== 68 kg ===
10–11 May

Round of 32
Alina Shauchuk (AIN)	6–2	Ámbar Garnica (MEX)
Albina Drazhi (ALB)	0–7 Fall	Zsuzsanna Molnár (SVK)
Dalma Caneva (ITA)	1–5	Alexandra Anghel (ROU)
Uilau Tarkong (PLW)	0–4 Fall	Noémi Szabados (HUN)
Elis Manolova (AZE)	2–10	Nicoll Parrado (COL)
Danutė Domikaitytė (LTU)	0–10	Linda Morais (CAN)

Round of 16
Adéla Hanzlíčková (CZE)	10^{F}
Tindra Sjöberg (SWE)	0
Alina Shauchuk (AIN)	0
Nisha Dahiya (IND)	3
Elma Zeidlere (LAT)	4
Zsuzsanna Molnár (SVK)	3
Alexandra Anghel (ROU)	9^{F}
Yelena Shalygina (KAZ)	1
Mimi Hristova (BUL)	4^{F}
Noémi Szabados (HUN)	0
Nicoll Parrado (COL)	7
Alina Berezhna (UKR)	8
Nabira Esenbaeva (UZB)	0
Linda Morais (CAN)	10
Ha Oh-young (KOR)	0
Zhou Feng (CHN)	4^{F}

Quarterfinals
Adéla Hanzlíčková (CZE)	4
Nisha Dahiya (IND)	7
Elma Zeidlere (LAT)	0
Alexandra Anghel (ROU)	10^{F}
Mimi Hristova (BUL)	10
Alina Berezhna (UKR)	0
Linda Morais (CAN)	0
Zhou Feng (CHN)	12

Semifinals
Nisha Dahiya (IND)	8
Alexandra Anghel (ROU)	4
Mimi Hristova (BUL)	2
Zhou Feng (CHN)	13

Olympic wrestle-off
Alexandra Anghel (ROU)	3
Linda Morais (CAN)	4

Repechage round 2
Alina Shauchuk (AIN)	0
Adéla Hanzlíčková (CZE)	2^{F}
Ha Oh-young (KOR)	0
Linda Morais (CAN)	10

Bronze medals
Adéla Hanzlíčková (CZE)	3
Alexandra Anghel (ROU)	5
Linda Morais (CAN)	14
Mimi Hristova (BUL)	4

=== 76 kg ===
10–11 May

Round of 32
Epp Mäe (EST)	2–1	Elmira Syzdykova (KAZ)
Chang Hui-tsz (TPE)	0–3	Francy Rädelt (GER)
Martina Kuenz (AUT)	5–7	Yuliana Yaneva (BUL)
Enrica Rinaldi (ITA)	6–0	Patrycja Sperka (POL)

Round of 16
Cătălina Axente (ROU)	6
Kamilė Gaučaitė (LTU)	0
Epp Mäe (EST)	1
Pauline Lecarpentier (FRA)	4
María Acosta (VEN)	2
Francy Rädelt (GER)	4
Hwang Eun-ju (KOR)	4
Anastasiya Zimiankova (AIN)	11^{F}
Anastasiia Osniach (UKR)	4^{F}
Annie Aloisio (ASA)	0
Yuliana Yaneva (BUL)	5
Kristina Shumova (AIN)	0
Agoro Papavasileiou (GRE)	0
Enrica Rinaldi (ITA)	10
Enkh-Amaryn Davaanasan (MGL)	6
Samar Amer (EGY)	1

Quarterfinals
Cătălina Axente (ROU)	2^{F}
Pauline Lecarpentier (FRA)	2
Francy Rädelt (GER)	2
Anastasiya Zimiankova (AIN)	2
Anastasiia Osniach (UKR)	2
Yuliana Yaneva (BUL)	6
Enrica Rinaldi (ITA)	0
Enkh-Amaryn Davaanasan (MGL)	4

Semifinals
Cătălina Axente (ROU)	6
Anastasiya Zimiankova (AIN)	3
Yuliana Yaneva (BUL)	4
Enkh-Amaryn Davaanasan (MGL)	1

Olympic wrestle-off
Pauline Lecarpentier (FRA)	4
Enkh-Amaryn Davaanasan (MGL)	7

Repechage round 1
Martina Kuenz (AUT)	5
Kristina Shumova (AIN)	0

Repechage round 2
Kamilė Gaučaitė (LTU)	0
Pauline Lecarpentier (FRA)	6
Martina Kuenz (AUT)	7
Anastasiia Osniach (UKR)	8^{F}

Bronze medals
Pauline Lecarpentier (FRA)	3
Anastasiya Zimiankova (AIN)	0
Anastasiia Osniach (UKR)	0^{R}
Enkh-Amaryn Davaanasan (MGL)	1
