= Wrestling at the 2015 European Games – Men's Greco-Roman 130 kg =

Competition in combat sports

Men's Greco-Roman 130 kg at the 2015 European Games
- Venue: Dowon Gymnasium
- Date: 14 June
- Competitors: 14 from 14 nations

Medalists
gold medal	Rıza Kayaalp	Turkey
silver medal	Sabah Shariati	Azerbaijan
bronze medal	Heiki Nabi	Estonia
bronze medal	Ioseb Chugoshvili	Belarus

Men's Greco-Roman 130 kg competition at the 2015 European Games in Baku, Azerbaijan, took place on 14 June at the Heydar Aliyev Arena.

== Schedule ==
All times are Azerbaijan Summer Time (UTC+05:00)

Date	Time	Event
Sunday, 14 June 2015	10:00	1/8 finals
Sunday, 14 June 2015	11:00	Quarterfinals
Sunday, 14 June 2015	13:00	Semifinals
Sunday, 14 June 2015	15:00	Repechage
Sunday, 14 June 2015	19:00	Finals

== Results ==
Legend

- C — Won by 3 cautions given to the opponent
- F — Won by fall

1/8 finals
(Turkey) Rıza Kayaalp (TUR)	2^{F}
(Hungary) Bálint Lám (HUN)	0
(Bulgaria) Miloslav Metodiev (BUL)	0
(Russia) Sergey Semenov (RUS)	6
(Belarus) Ioseb Chugoshvili (BLR)	8
(Greece) Alexandros Papadatos (GRE)	0
(Germany) Eduard Popp (GER)	4
(Lithuania) Mantas Knystautas (LTU)	0
(Austria) Lukas Hörmann (AUT)	0
(Georgia (country)) Iakobi Kajaia (GEO)	5
(Azerbaijan) Sabah Shariati (AZE)	8
(Ukraine) Mykola Kuchmii (UKR)	0

Quarterfinals
(Estonia) Heiki Nabi (EST)	7
(Sweden) Sebastian Lönnborn (SWE)	0
(Turkey) Rıza Kayaalp (TUR)	3
(Russia) Sergey Semenov (RUS)	0
(Belarus) Ioseb Chugoshvili (BLR)	8
(Germany) Eduard Popp (GER)	0
(Georgia (country)) Iakobi Kajaia (GEO)	2
(Azerbaijan) Sabah Shariati (AZE)	5

Semifinals
(Estonia) Heiki Nabi (EST)	0
(Turkey) Rıza Kayaalp (TUR)	7
(Belarus) Ioseb Chugoshvili (BLR)	0
(Azerbaijan) Sabah Shariati (AZE)	6^{C}

Final
(Turkey) Rıza Kayaalp (TUR)	3
(Azerbaijan) Sabah Shariati (AZE)	1

=== Repechage ===
Repechage round 1
(Hungary) Bálint Lám (HUN)	4
(Russia) Sergey Semenov (RUS)	0
(Ukraine) Mykola Kuchmii (UKR)	4
(Georgia (country)) Iakobi Kajaia (GEO)	7

Bronze medal match
(Hungary) Bálint Lám (HUN)	0
(Estonia) Heiki Nabi (EST)	1
(Georgia (country)) Iakobi Kajaia (GEO)	0
(Belarus) Ioseb Chugoshvili (BLR)	3
