= 2019 European Wrestling Championships – Men's Greco-Roman 130 kg =

Wrestling competition

The Men's Greco-Roman 130 kg is a competition featured at the 2019 European Wrestling Championships, and was held in Bucharest, Romania on April 12 and April 13.

== Medalists ==
Gold	Rıza Kayaalp; Turkey
Silver	Iakob Kajaia; Georgia
Bronze	Sergey Semenov; Russia
Bronze	Alin Alexuc-Ciurariu; Romania

== Results ==
Legend

- F — Won by fall

=== Final ===
Final
Iakob Kajaia (GEO)	0
Rıza Kayaalp (TUR)	3

=== Top half ===
Round of 32

Round of 16
Iakob Kajaia (GEO)	8
Tuomas Lahti (FIN)	0
Romas Fridrikas (LTU)	2
Rafał Krajewski (POL)	3
David Ovasapyan (ARM)	0
Sergey Semenov (RUS)	5
Oskar Marvik (NOR)	2
Miloslav Metodiev (BUL)	3

Quarterfinals
Iakob Kajaia (GEO)	9
Rafał Krajewski (POL)	0
Sergey Semenov (RUS)	9
Miloslav Metodiev (BUL)	0

Semifinals
Iakob Kajaia (GEO)	3
Sergey Semenov (RUS)	2

=== Bottom half ===
Round of 32
Sabah Shariati (AZE)	7
Štěpán David (CZE)	1
Ante Milković (CRO)	0
Rıza Kayaalp (TUR)	5^{F}

Round of 16
Eduard Popp (GER)	3
Heiki Nabi (EST)	5
Oleksandr Chernetskyi (UKR)	1
Ioseb Chugoshvili (BLR)	3
Alin Alexuc-Ciurariu (ROU)	2
Bálint Lám (HUN)	0
Sabah Shariati (AZE)	0
Rıza Kayaalp (TUR)	5

Quarterfinals
Heiki Nabi (EST)	1
Ioseb Chugoshvili (BLR)	1
Alin Alexuc-Ciurariu (ROU)	0
Rıza Kayaalp (TUR)	5

Semifinals
Heiki Nabi (EST)	0
Rıza Kayaalp (TUR)	4

=== Repechage ===
Repechage round 1
Ante Milković (CRO)	2
Sabah Shariati (AZE)	10

Repechage round 2
Tuomas Lahti (FIN)	2
Rafał Krajewski (POL)	1
Sabah Shariati (AZE)	2
Alin Alexuc-Ciurariu (ROU)	0

Bronze medal match
Tuomas Lahti (FIN)	0
Sergey Semenov (RUS)	4
Alin Alexuc-Ciurariu (ROU)	1
Heiki Nabi (EST)	1
