= Wrestling at the 2019 European Games – Men's Greco-Roman 130 kg =

Men's Greco-Roman 130 kg at the 2019 European Games
- Venue: Minsk Sports Palace
- Date: 29 June and 30 June
- Competitors: 15 from 15 nations

Medalists
gold medal	Iakob Kajaia	Georgia
silver medal	Sergey Semenov	Russia
bronze medal	Sabah Shariati	Azerbaijan
bronze medal	Mykola Kuchmii	Ukraine

The Men's Greco-Roman 130 kilograms competition at the 2019 European Games in Minsk was held on 29 and 30 June 2019 at the Minsk Sports Palace.

Kiryl Hryshchanka from Belarus originally won the gold medal, but was later disqualified for doping violations.

== Schedule ==
All times are in FET (UTC+03:00)

Date	Time	Event
Saturday, 29 June 2019	12:10	1/8 finals
Saturday, 29 June 2019	13:00	Quarterfinals
Saturday, 29 June 2019	18:20	Semifinals
Sunday, 30 June 2019	13:20	Repechage
Sunday, 30 June 2019	14:20	Finals

== Results ==
Legend

- F — Won by fall

=== Main bracket ===
1/8 finals
Rafał Płowiec (POL)	0
~~Kiryl Hryshchanka (BLR)~~	3^{F}
Štěpán David (CZE)	1
Osman Yıldırım (TUR)	3
Sergey Semenov (RUS)	2
Jello Krahmer (GER)	0
Romas Fridrikas (LTU)	0
Iakob Kajaia (GEO)	4
Ante Milković (CRO)	0
Sabah Shariati (AZE)	3^{F}
Alin Alexuc-Ciurariu (ROU)	3
Artur Vititin (EST)	0
Oskar Marvik (NOR)	2
Tuomas Lahti (FIN)	1

Quarterfinals
Mykola Kuchmii (UKR)	1
~~Kiryl Hryshchanka (BLR)~~	3
Osman Yıldırım (TUR)	1
Sergey Semenov (RUS)	7
Iakob Kajaia (GEO)	10
Sabah Shariati (AZE)	4
Alin Alexuc-Ciurariu (ROU)	0
Oskar Marvik (NOR)	2

Semifinals
~~Kiryl Hryshchanka (BLR)~~	3
Sergey Semenov (RUS)	1
Iakob Kajaia (GEO)	2^{F}
Oskar Marvik (NOR)	0

Final
~~Kiryl Hryshchanka (BLR)~~	5
Iakob Kajaia (GEO)	1

=== Repechage ===
Repechage round 1
Rafał Płowiec (POL)	1
Mykola Kuchmii (UKR)	7
Romas Fridrikas (LTU)	1
Sabah Shariati (AZE)	3

Bronze medals
Mykola Kuchmii (UKR)	1
Sergey Semenov (RUS)	10
Sabah Shariati (AZE)	3
Oskar Marvik (NOR)	2
