= 2021 European Wrestling Olympic Qualification Tournament =

- Venue: BOK Sports Hall
- Location: Budapest, Hungary
- Dates: 18–21 March 2021

The 2021 European Wrestling Olympic Qualification Tournament is the second regional qualifying tournament for the 2020 Summer Olympics. The event was held from 18 to 21 March 2021, in BOK Sports Hall, Budapest, Hungary.

== Qualification summary ==
A total of 36 athletes secured a spot in the 2020 Summer Olympics, in Tokyo, Japan. Two spots were given to each of the weight classes in every event. This allows a total of 12 available spots for each event. Every winner and runner-up per class were awarded their place for wrestling, at the 2020 Summer Olympics. Quota places are allocated to the respective NOC and not to competitor that achieved the place in the qualification event.

NOC	Men's freestyle						Men's Greco-Roman						Women's freestyle						Total
NOC	57	65	74	86	97	125	60	67	77	87	97	130	50	53	57	62	68	76	Total
Armenia	X	X																	2
Azerbaijan		X	X							X									3
Belarus				X	X	X								X				X	5
Bulgaria	X										X		X		X				4
Croatia									X										1
Finland											X								1
France																	X		1
Georgia			X					X		X									3
Germany						X	X												2
Hungary								X											1
Latvia																X			1
Lithuania												X							1
ROC									X			X					X	X	4
Sweden														X					1
Turkey				X	X		X						X						4
Ukraine															X	X			2
Total: 16 NOCs	2	2	2	2	2	2	2	2	2	2	2	2	2	2	2	2	2	2	36

== Men's freestyle ==
=== 57 kg ===
18–19 March

Round of 16
Răzvan Kovacs (ROU)	4
Levan Metreveli (ESP)	1
Islam Bazarganov (AZE)	5
Niklas Stechele (GER)	0
Uladzislau Andreyeu (BLR)	2
Arsen Harutyunyan (ARM)	10
Beka Bujiashvili (GEO)	10
Vladimir Egorov (MKD)	0
Gamzatgadzsi Halidov (HUN)	6
Simone Piroddu (ITA)	0

Quarterfinals
Georgi Vangelov (BUL)	12
Petru Crăciun (MDA)	0
Răzvan Kovacs (ROU)	0
Islam Bazarganov (AZE)	12
Arsen Harutyunyan (ARM)	10
Beka Bujiashvili (GEO)	5
Gamzatgadzsi Halidov (HUN)	2
Andriy Yatsenko (UKR)	5

Semifinals
Georgi Vangelov (BUL)	9
Islam Bazarganov (AZE)	1
Arsen Harutyunyan (ARM)	10
Andriy Yatsenko (UKR)	0

Final
Georgi Vangelov (BUL)	3
Arsen Harutyunyan (ARM)	8

Repechage round 1
~~Uladzislau Andreyeu (BLR)~~
Beka Bujiashvili (GEO)	WO

Bronze medals
~~Petru Crăciun (MDA)~~
Islam Bazarganov (AZE)	WO
Beka Bujiashvili (GEO)
Andriy Yatsenko (UKR)	WO

=== 65 kg ===
18–19 March

Round of 32
Vasyl Shuptar (UKR)	1–3	Vladimer Khinchegashvili (GEO)
Vazgen Tevanyan (ARM)	11–0	Vladimir Dubov (BUL)

Round of 16
Selahattin Kılıçsallayan (TUR)	9
Elmedin Sejfulau (MKD)	4
George Ramm (GBR)	2
Haji Aliyev (AZE)	13
Juan Pablo González (ESP)	1
Maxim Saculțan (MDA)	9
Abdellatif Mansour (ITA)	4
Georgios Pilidis (GRE)	8
Alexander Semisorow (GER)	4
David Habat (SLO)	8
George Bucur (ROU)	4
Magomedmurad Gadzhiev (POL)	5
Ilman Mukhtarov (FRA)	2
Vladimer Khinchegashvili (GEO)	8
Vazgen Tevanyan (ARM)	7
Niurgun Skriabin (BLR)	5

Quarterfinals
Selahattin Kılıçsallayan (TUR)	2
Haji Aliyev (AZE)	5
Maxim Saculțan (MDA)	2
Georgios Pilidis (GRE)	0
David Habat (SLO)	0
Magomedmurad Gadzhiev (POL)	6
Vladimer Khinchegashvili (GEO)	4
Vazgen Tevanyan (ARM)	6

Semifinals
Haji Aliyev (AZE)	5
Maxim Saculțan (MDA)	1
Magomedmurad Gadzhiev (POL)	2
Vazgen Tevanyan (ARM)	4

Final
Haji Aliyev (AZE)	0
Vazgen Tevanyan (ARM)	9

Repechage round 1
Vladimir Dubov (BUL)	4
Niurgun Skriabin (BLR)	6

Repechage round 2
George Ramm (GBR)	0
Selahattin Kılıçsallayan (TUR)	10
Niurgun Skriabin (BLR)	8
Vladimer Khinchegashvili (GEO)	10

Bronze medals
Selahattin Kılıçsallayan (TUR)	5
Maxim Saculțan (MDA)	3
Vladimer Khinchegashvili (GEO)	WO
Magomedmurad Gadzhiev (POL)

=== 74 kg ===
18–19 March

Round of 32
Georgios Kougioumtsidis (GRE)	12–2	Malik Amine (SMR)
Hrayr Alikhanyan (ARM)	10–0	Simon Marchl (AUT)
Denys Pavlov (UKR)	4–14	Avtandil Kentchadze (GEO)
Ali-Pasha Umarpashaev (BUL)	10–0	Jonatan Álvarez (ESP)
Erik Reinbok (EST)	1–8	Tajmuraz Salkazanov (SVK)
Mitch Finesilver (ISR)	0–7	Mahamedkhabib Kadzimahamedau (BLR)

Round of 16
Murad Kuramagomedov (HUN)	8
Marc Dietsche (SUI)	0
Charles-André Afa (FRA)	6
Khadzhimurad Gadzhiyev (AZE)	13^{F}
Maxim Vasilioglo (ROU)	12
Eriglent Prizreni (ALB)	2
Vasile Diacon (MDA)	10
Andrius Mažeika (LTU)	22
~~Amir Reza Ghasemikia (GBR)~~
Georgios Kougioumtsidis (GRE)	WO
Hrayr Alikhanyan (ARM)	2
Avtandil Kentchadze (GEO)	10
Ali-Pasha Umarpashaev (BUL)	8^{F}
Tajmuraz Salkazanov (SVK)	4
Mahamedkhabib Kadzimahamedau (BLR)	8
Soner Demirtaş (TUR)	7

Quarterfinals
Murad Kuramagomedov (HUN)	4
Khadzhimurad Gadzhiyev (AZE)	5
Maxim Vasilioglo (ROU)	9
Andrius Mažeika (LTU)	2
Georgios Kougioumtsidis (GRE)	9
Avtandil Kentchadze (GEO)	14
Ali-Pasha Umarpashaev (BUL)	4
Mahamedkhabib Kadzimahamedau (BLR)	4

Semifinals
Khadzhimurad Gadzhiyev (AZE)	7
Maxim Vasilioglo (ROU)	0
Avtandil Kentchadze (GEO)	4^{F}
Ali-Pasha Umarpashaev (BUL)	6

Final
Khadzhimurad Gadzhiyev (AZE)
Avtandil Kentchadze (GEO)	WO

Repechage round 1
Denys Pavlov (UKR)	4
Hrayr Alikhanyan (ARM)	2

Repechage round 2
Charles-André Afa (FRA)	0
Murad Kuramagomedov (HUN)	9^{F}
Denys Pavlov (UKR)	3
Georgios Kougioumtsidis (GRE)	9

Bronze medals
Murad Kuramagomedov (HUN)	2
Maxim Vasilioglo (ROU)	4
Georgios Kougioumtsidis (GRE)	8
Ali-Pasha Umarpashaev (BUL)	6

=== 86 kg ===
18–19 March

Round of 16
Ahmed Dudarov (GER)	1
Akhmed Magamaev (BUL)	8
Ville Heino (FIN)	6
Akhmed Aibuev (FRA)	9
Ali Shabanau (BLR)	11
Georgios Savvoulidis (GRE)	0
Piotr Ianulov (MDA)	6
Ivars Samušonoks (LAT)	4
Abubakr Abakarov (AZE)	10
István Veréb (HUN)	5
Hovhannes Mkhitaryan (ARM)	0
Osman Göçen (TUR)	6
Sandro Aminashvili (GEO)	4
Sebastian Jezierzański (POL)	2
Simone Iannattoni (ITA)	0
Boris Makoev (SVK)	11

Quarterfinals
Akhmed Magamaev (BUL)	10
Akhmed Aibuev (FRA)	0
Ali Shabanau (BLR)	1
Piotr Ianulov (MDA)	1
Abubakr Abakarov (AZE)	4
Osman Göçen (TUR)	4
Sandro Aminashvili (GEO)	0
Boris Makoev (SVK)	6

Semifinals
Akhmed Magamaev (BUL)	0
Ali Shabanau (BLR)	6
Osman Göçen (TUR)	16
Boris Makoev (SVK)	6

Final
Ali Shabanau (BLR)	7
Osman Göçen (TUR)	0

Repechage round 1
Georgios Savvoulidis (GRE)	0
Piotr Ianulov (MDA)	7
Hovhannes Mkhitaryan (ARM)	5
Abubakr Abakarov (AZE)	8

Bronze medals
Piotr Ianulov (MDA)	4
Akhmed Magamaev (BUL)	4
Abubakr Abakarov (AZE)	5
Boris Makoev (SVK)	7

=== 97 kg ===
18–19 March

Round of 16
Akhmed Bataev (BUL)	7
Mahamed Zakariiev (UKR)	0
Radu Lefter (MDA)	0
Aliaksandr Hushtyn (BLR)	10
Timofei Xenidis (GRE)	1
Erik Thiele (GER)	11
Radosław Baran (POL)	8
Samuel Scherrer (SUI)	3
Süleyman Karadeniz (TUR)	5
Milán Korcsog (HUN)	2

Quarterfinals
Abraham Conyedo (ITA)	10
Lukas Krasauskas (LTU)	0
Akhmed Bataev (BUL)	3
Aliaksandr Hushtyn (BLR)	4
Erik Thiele (GER)	2
Radosław Baran (POL)	1
Süleyman Karadeniz (TUR)	5
Albert Saritov (ROU)	3

Semifinals
Abraham Conyedo (ITA)	0
Aliaksandr Hushtyn (BLR)	9
Erik Thiele (GER)	1
Süleyman Karadeniz (TUR)	2

Final
Aliaksandr Hushtyn (BLR)	4
Süleyman Karadeniz (TUR)	3

Repechage round 1
Radu Lefter (MDA)
Akhmed Bataev (BUL)	WO
Milán Korcsog (HUN)	0^{R}
Albert Saritov (ROU)	4

Bronze medals
Akhmed Bataev (BUL)	0
Abraham Conyedo (ITA)	3
Albert Saritov (ROU)	3
Erik Thiele (GER)	4

=== 125 kg ===
18–19 March

Round of 16
Gennadij Cudinovic (GER)	12
José Cuba (ESP)	1
Georgi Ivanov (BUL)	0
Johannes Ludescher (AUT)	3
Dzianis Khramiankou (BLR)	9
Dániel Ligeti (HUN)	0
Shamil Sharipov (ROC)	4
Şamhan Jabrailov (MDA)	1

Quarterfinals
Jamaladdin Magomedov (AZE)	3
Jere Heino (FIN)	2
Paris Karepi (ALB)	0
Gennadij Cudinovic (GER)	5
Johannes Ludescher (AUT)	1
Dzianis Khramiankou (BLR)	12
Shamil Sharipov (ROC)	3
Robert Baran (POL)	2

Semifinals
Jamaladdin Magomedov (AZE)	6
Gennadij Cudinovic (GER)	15^{C}
Dzianis Khramiankou (BLR)	4
Shamil Sharipov (ROC)	4

Final
Gennadij Cudinovic (GER)	0^{R}
Dzianis Khramiankou (BLR)	1

Repechage round 1
José Cuba (ESP)	3
Paris Karepi (ALB)	6
Dániel Ligeti (HUN)	1
Johannes Ludescher (AUT)	7

Bronze medals
Paris Karepi (ALB)	0
Jamaladdin Magomedov (AZE)	11
Johannes Ludescher (AUT)	0
Shamil Sharipov (ROC)	8

== Men's Greco-Roman ==
=== 60 kg ===
20–21 March

Round of 32
Ardit Fazljija (SWE)	1–3	Dawid Ersetic (POL)

Round of 16
Kerem Kamal (TUR)	5
Irakli Dzimistarishvili (GEO)	1
Victor Ciobanu (MDA)	7
Soslan Daurov (BLR)	2
Răzvan Arnăut (ROU)	0
Ivo Angelov (BUL)	9
Stig-André Berge (NOR)	1
Erik Torba (HUN)	3
Ivan Lizatović (CRO)	2^{F}
Jacopo Sandron (ITA)	0
Etienne Kinsinger (GER)	5
Helary Mägisalu (EST)	4
Justas Petravičius (LTU)	4
Murad Mammadov (AZE)	7
Dawid Ersetic (POL)	0
Gevorg Gharibyan (ARM)	7

Quarterfinals
Kerem Kamal (TUR)	9
Victor Ciobanu (MDA)	1
Ivo Angelov (BUL)	1
Erik Torba (HUN)	4
Ivan Lizatović (CRO)	2
Etienne Kinsinger (GER)	8
Murad Mammadov (AZE)	5
Gevorg Gharibyan (ARM)	1

Semifinals
Kerem Kamal (TUR)	5
Erik Torba (HUN)	4
Etienne Kinsinger (GER)	5
Murad Mammadov (AZE)	3

Final
Kerem Kamal (TUR)	5
Etienne Kinsinger (GER)	1

Repechage round 2
Irakli Dzimistarishvili (GEO)	9
Victor Ciobanu (MDA)	0
Helary Mägisalu (EST)	0
Ivan Lizatović (CRO)	8

Bronze medals
Irakli Dzimistarishvili (GEO)	4
Erik Torba (HUN)	2
Ivan Lizatović (CRO)	WO
Murad Mammadov (AZE)

=== 67 kg ===
20–21 March

Round of 32
Artur Politaiev (UKR)	9–0	Andreas Vetsch (SUI)
Mamadassa Sylla (FRA)	4–0	Edgaras Venckaitis (LTU)
Aliaksandr Liavonchyk (BLR)	6–9	Slavik Galstyan (ARM)
Islambek Dadov (AZE)	9–0	Mihai Mihuț (ROU)

Round of 16
Morten Thoresen (NOR)	1
Bálint Korpási (HUN)	4
Deyvid Dimitrov (BUL)	3
Daniel Soini (SWE)	2
Aker Al-Obaidi (EOR)	0
Donior Islamov (MDA)	13
Ruben Marvice (ITA)	1
Elmer Mattila (FIN)	6
Danijel Janečić (CRO)	4
Atakan Yüksel (TUR)	1
Ramaz Zoidze (GEO)	6
Artur Politaiev (UKR)	6
Mamadassa Sylla (FRA)	1
Slavik Galstyan (ARM)	10
Islambek Dadov (AZE)	4
Gevorg Sahakyan (POL)	1

Quarterfinals
Bálint Korpási (HUN)	6
Deyvid Dimitrov (BUL)	2
Donior Islamov (MDA)	1
Elmer Mattila (FIN)	1
Danijel Janečić (CRO)	0
Ramaz Zoidze (GEO)	8
Slavik Galstyan (ARM)	14
Islambek Dadov (AZE)	6

Semifinals
Bálint Korpási (HUN)	6
Donior Islamov (MDA)	0
Ramaz Zoidze (GEO)	10
Slavik Galstyan (ARM)	1

Final
Bálint Korpási (HUN)
Ramaz Zoidze (GEO)	WO

Repechage round 2
Morten Thoresen (NOR)	2
Deyvid Dimitrov (BUL)	2
Artur Politaiev (UKR)	WO
Danijel Janečić (CRO)

Bronze medals
Deyvid Dimitrov (BUL)	9^{C}
Donior Islamov (MDA)	7
Artur Politaiev (UKR)	WO
Slavik Galstyan (ARM)

=== 77 kg ===
20–21 March

Round of 32
Fatih Cengiz (TUR)	4–4	Aik Mnatsakanian (BUL)
Yaroslav Filchakov (UKR)	3–1	Viktar Sasunouski (BLR)
Gela Bolkvadze (GEO)	6–2	Ilie Cojocari (ROU)
Pascal Eisele (GER)	2–5	Aleksandr Chekhirkin (ROC)
Viktor Nemeš (SRB)	5–1	Georgios Prevolarakis (GRE)

Round of 16
Sanan Suleymanov (AZE)	10
Alexandrin Guțu (MDA)	3
Mateusz Wolny (POL)	0
Božo Starčević (CRO)	8
Oldřich Varga (CZE)	11
Per-Anders Kure (NOR)	0
Evrik Nikoghosyan (FRA)	9
Roman Zhernovetski (ISR)	0
Matias Lipasti (FIN)	7
Denis Horváth (SVK)	3
Aik Mnatsakanian (BUL)	5^{F}
Yaroslav Filchakov (UKR)	1
Gela Bolkvadze (GEO)	1
Aleksandr Chekhirkin (ROC)	2
Viktor Nemeš (SRB)	1
Paulius Galkinas (LTU)	1

Quarterfinals
Sanan Suleymanov (AZE)	1
Božo Starčević (CRO)	1
Oldřich Varga (CZE)	3
Evrik Nikoghosyan (FRA)	2
Matias Lipasti (FIN)	0
Aik Mnatsakanian (BUL)	11
Aleksandr Chekhirkin (ROC)	3
Viktor Nemeš (SRB)	1

Semifinals
Božo Starčević (CRO)	3
Oldřich Varga (CZE)	1
Aik Mnatsakanian (BUL)	6
Aleksandr Chekhirkin (ROC)	7

Final
Božo Starčević (CRO)
Aleksandr Chekhirkin (ROC)	WO

Repechage round 1
Pascal Eisele (GER)	WO
Gela Bolkvadze (GEO)

Repechage round 2
Mateusz Wolny (POL)	0
Sanan Suleymanov (AZE)	4
Pascal Eisele (GER)	1
Viktor Nemeš (SRB)	1

Bronze medals
Sanan Suleymanov (AZE)	WO
Oldřich Varga (CZE)
Viktor Nemeš (SRB)	WO
Aik Mnatsakanian (BUL)

=== 87 kg ===
20–21 March

Round of 32
Zakarias Berg (SWE)	2–0	Michael Wagner (AUT)
Szymon Szymonowicz (POL)	0–5	Daniel Aleksandrov (BUL)

Round of 16
Ivan Huklek (CRO)	2
Artur Shahinyan (ARM)	6
Lasha Gobadze (GEO)	1
Metehan Başar (TUR)	1
Milad Alirzaev (ROC)	5
Zurabi Datunashvili (SRB)	4
Fabio Parisi (ITA)	7
Petr Novák (CZE)	6
Ramon Betschart (SUI)	WO
~~Dimitrios Papadopoulos (GRE)~~
Mihail Bradu (MDA)	7
Vili Ropponen (FIN)	5
Martynas Nemsevičius (LTU)	1
Zakarias Berg (SWE)	7
Daniel Aleksandrov (BUL)	1
Islam Abbasov (AZE)	5

Quarterfinals
Artur Shahinyan (ARM)	4
Lasha Gobadze (GEO)	6
Milad Alirzaev (ROC)	7
Fabio Parisi (ITA)	2
Ramon Betschart (SUI)	10
Mihail Bradu (MDA)	2
Zakarias Berg (SWE)	1
Islam Abbasov (AZE)	6

Semifinals
Lasha Gobadze (GEO)	9
Milad Alirzaev (ROC)	5
Ramon Betschart (SUI)	1
Islam Abbasov (AZE)	6

Final
Lasha Gobadze (GEO)
Islam Abbasov (AZE)	WO

Repechage round 2
Metehan Başar (TUR)	WO
Artur Shahinyan (ARM)
Daniel Aleksandrov (BUL)	2
Zakarias Berg (SWE)	1

Bronze medals
Metehan Başar (TUR)	WO
Milad Alirzaev (ROC)
Daniel Aleksandrov (BUL)	5
Ramon Betschart (SUI)	1

=== 97 kg ===
20–21 March

Round of 16
Nikoloz Kakhelashvili (ITA)	8
Oleksandr Shyshman (UKR)	0
~~Felix Baldauf (NOR)~~
Aliaksandr Hrabovik (BLR)	WO
~~Mélonin Noumonvi (FRA)~~
Pontus Lund (SWE)	WO
Ramsin Azizsir (GER)	0
Arvi Savolainen (FIN)	8
Vilius Laurinaitis (LTU)	0
Alex Szőke (HUN)	3
Kiril Milov (BUL)	9
Markus Ragginger (AUT)	0
Laokratis Kesidis (GRE)	1
Murat Lokyaev (AZE)	10
Damian von Euw (SUI)	0
Artur Omarov (CZE)	2

Quarterfinals
Nikoloz Kakhelashvili (ITA)	2
Aliaksandr Hrabovik (BLR)	0
Pontus Lund (SWE)	0
Arvi Savolainen (FIN)	10
Alex Szőke (HUN)	1
Kiril Milov (BUL)	3
Murat Lokyaev (AZE)	3
Artur Omarov (CZE)	4

Semifinals
Nikoloz Kakhelashvili (ITA)	5
Arvi Savolainen (FIN)	5
Kiril Milov (BUL)	9
Artur Omarov (CZE)	0

Final
Arvi Savolainen (FIN)	WO
Kiril Milov (BUL)

Repechage round 1
Ramsin Azizsir (GER)	1
Pontus Lund (SWE)	2
Markus Ragginger (AUT)	1
Alex Szőke (HUN)	5

Bronze medals
Pontus Lund (SWE)	WO
Nikoloz Kakhelashvili (ITA)
Alex Szőke (HUN)	WO
Artur Omarov (CZE)

=== 130 kg ===
20–21 March

Round of 32
Boban Živanović (SRB)	3–7	Radoslav Georgiev (BUL)

Round of 16
Alin Alexuc-Ciurariu (ROU)	1
Marko Koščević (CRO)	3
Mantas Knystautas (LTU)	WO
~~Oskar Marvik (NOR)~~
Georgi Chugoshvili (BLR)	2
Rafał Krajewski (POL)	6
Alexandros Papadatos (GRE)	WO
~~Beka Kandelaki (AZE)~~
Konsta Mäenpää (FIN)	1
David Ovasapyan (ARM)	5
Štěpán David (CZE)	1
Ádám Varga (HUN)	3
Luca Godino (ITA)	0
Sergey Semenov (ROC)	6^{F}
Radoslav Georgiev (BUL)	2
Mykola Kuchmii (UKR)	2

Quarterfinals
Marko Koščević (CRO)	1
Mantas Knystautas (LTU)	3
Rafał Krajewski (POL)	9
Alexandros Papadatos (GRE)	0
David Ovasapyan (ARM)	1
Ádám Varga (HUN)	3
Sergey Semenov (ROC)	8
Radoslav Georgiev (BUL)	0

Semifinals
Mantas Knystautas (LTU)	4
Rafał Krajewski (POL)	1
Ádám Varga (HUN)	0
Sergey Semenov (ROC)	4^{F}

Final
Mantas Knystautas (LTU)	1
Sergey Semenov (ROC)	5

Repechage round 2
~~Oskar Marvik (NOR)~~
Marko Koščević (CRO)	WO
Luca Godino (ITA)	1
Radoslav Georgiev (BUL)	5

Bronze medals
Marko Koščević (CRO)	5
Rafał Krajewski (POL)	11
Radoslav Georgiev (BUL)	1
Ádám Varga (HUN)	3

== Women's freestyle ==
=== 50 kg ===
19–20 March

Round of 16
Natallia Varakina (BLR)	4
Jonna Malmgren (SWE)	6

Quarterfinals
Evin Demirhan (TUR)	11
Taru Vainionpää (FIN)	0
Julie Sabatié (FRA)	6
Mariana Drăguțan (MDA)	5
Lisa Ersel (GER)	0
Iwona Matkowska (POL)	10
Jonna Malmgren (SWE)	4
Miglena Selishka (BUL)	12

Semifinals
Evin Demirhan (TUR)	5
Julie Sabatié (FRA)	1
Iwona Matkowska (POL)	1
Miglena Selishka (BUL)	4

Final
Evin Demirhan (TUR)
Miglena Selishka (BUL)	WO

Bronze medals
Taru Vainionpää (FIN)	0
Julie Sabatié (FRA)	5
Jonna Malmgren (SWE)	1
Iwona Matkowska (POL)	8

=== 53 kg ===
19–20 March

Round of 16
Szimonetta Szekér (HUN)	3
Leyla Gurbanova (AZE)	4
Iulia Leorda (MDA)	8
Nina Hemmer (GER)	6
Carmen Di Dio (ITA)	WO
~~Sezen Belberova (BUL)~~
Andreea Ana (ROU)	7
Zeynep Yetgil (TUR)	0
Mariia Vynnyk (UKR)	0
Sofia Mattsson (SWE)	11
Stalvira Orshush (ROC)	4^{F}
Marina Rueda (ESP)	0

Quarterfinals
Vanesa Kaladzinskaya (BLR)	10
Leyla Gurbanova (AZE)	0
Iulia Leorda (MDA)	10
Carmen Di Dio (ITA)	0
Andreea Ana (ROU)	0
Sofia Mattsson (SWE)	10
Stalvira Orshush (ROC)	14
Jessica Blaszka (NED)	3

Semifinals
Vanesa Kaladzinskaya (BLR)	9
Iulia Leorda (MDA)	3
Sofia Mattsson (SWE)	6^{F}
Stalvira Orshush (ROC)	4

Final
Vanesa Kaladzinskaya (BLR)	0
Sofia Mattsson (SWE)	10

Repechage round 1
Mariia Vynnyk (UKR)	5
Andreea Ana (ROU)	1

Bronze medals
Leyla Gurbanova (AZE)	0
Iulia Leorda (MDA)	10
Mariia Vynnyk (UKR)	4
Stalvira Orshush (ROC)	5

=== 57 kg ===
19–20 March

Round of 16
Evelina Nikolova (BUL)	6
Alyona Kolesnik (AZE)	0
Johanna Lindborg (SWE)	5
Aurora Russo (ITA)	2
Kateryna Zhydachevska (ROU)	4
Laura Mertens (GER)	6
Emese Barka (HUN)	4^{F}
Graciela Sánchez (ESP)	0

Quarterfinals
Grace Bullen (NOR)	2
Bediha Gün (TUR)	4
Veronika Chumikova (ROC)	6
Evelina Nikolova (BUL)	6
Johanna Lindborg (SWE)	5
Laura Mertens (GER)	3
Emese Barka (HUN)	1
Alina Hrushyna (UKR)	6

Semifinals
Bediha Gün (TUR)	2
Evelina Nikolova (BUL)	4
Johanna Lindborg (SWE)	0
Alina Hrushyna (UKR)	10

Final
Evelina Nikolova (BUL)	WO
Alina Hrushyna (UKR)

Repechage round 1
Alyona Kolesnik (AZE)	0
Veronika Chumikova (ROC)	11

Bronze medals
Veronika Chumikova (ROC)	WO
Bediha Gün (TUR)
Emese Barka (HUN)	7
Johanna Lindborg (SWE)	3

=== 62 kg ===
19–20 March

Round of 16
Maryia Mamashuk (BLR)	10^{F}
Améline Douarre (FRA)	0
Iryna Koliadenko (UKR)	4^{F}
Luisa Niemesch (GER)	0
Katarzyna Mądrowska (POL)	0
Elif Jale Yeşilırmak (TUR)	6
Lyubov Ovcharova (ROC)	4
Kriszta Incze (ROU)	11
Anastasija Grigorjeva (LAT)	12
Sara Da Col (ITA)	1

Quarterfinals
Mariana Cherdivara (MDA)	2
Lydia Pérez (ESP)	1
Maryia Mamashuk (BLR)	0
Iryna Koliadenko (UKR)	6
Elif Jale Yeşilırmak (TUR)	6
Kriszta Incze (ROU)	2
Anastasija Grigorjeva (LAT)	3
Tetiana Omelchenko (AZE)	2

Semifinals
Mariana Cherdivara (MDA)	0
Iryna Koliadenko (UKR)	10
Elif Jale Yeşilırmak (TUR)	4
Anastasija Grigorjeva (LAT)	4

Final
Iryna Koliadenko (UKR)	15
Anastasija Grigorjeva (LAT)	4

Repechage round 1
Luisa Niemesch (GER)	0
Maryia Mamashuk (BLR)	3
Sara Da Col (ITA)	0
Tetiana Omelchenko (AZE)	6^{F}

Bronze medals
Maryia Mamashuk (BLR)	1
Mariana Cherdivara (MDA)	4
Tetiana Omelchenko (AZE)	2
Elif Jale Yeşilırmak (TUR)	1

=== 68 kg ===
19–20 March

Round of 16
Buse Tosun (TUR)	0
Yuliana Yaneva (BUL)	9
Adéla Hanzlíčková (CZE)	5^{F}
Hanna Sadchanka (BLR)	0
Alexandra Anghel (ROU)
Dalma Caneva (ITA)	WO
Elis Manolova (AZE)	4^{F}
Ilana Kratysh (ISR)	0
Danutė Domikaitytė (LTU)	8
Noémi Szabados (HUN)	5
Irina Rîngaci (MDA)	10
Agnieszka Wieszczek (POL)	0

Quarterfinals
Koumba Larroque (FRA)	6
Yuliana Yaneva (BUL)	2
Adéla Hanzlíčková (CZE)	4
Dalma Caneva (ITA)	5
Elis Manolova (AZE)	4
Danutė Domikaitytė (LTU)	1
Irina Rîngaci (MDA)	12
Khanum Velieva (ROC)	13

Semifinals
Koumba Larroque (FRA)	11
Dalma Caneva (ITA)	0
Elis Manolova (AZE)	0
Khanum Velieva (ROC)	6

Final
Koumba Larroque (FRA)	WO
Khanum Velieva (ROC)

Bronze medals
Yuliana Yaneva (BUL)	WO
Dalma Caneva (ITA)
Irina Rîngaci (MDA)	8
Elis Manolova (AZE)	0

=== 76 kg ===
19–20 March

Round of 16
Vasilisa Marzaliuk (BLR)	9^{F}
Zsanett Németh (HUN)	0
Aikaterini Pitsiava (GRE)	0
Alla Belinska (UKR)	12^{F}
Georgina Nelthorpe (GBR)	3
Gozal Zutova (AZE)	1
Mariya Oryashkova (BUL)	3^{F}
Cătălina Axente (ROU)	2
Natalia Vorobieva (ROC)	4^{F}
Natalia Strzałka (POL)	0
Iselin Moen Solheim (NOR)	4^{F}
Eleni Pjollaj (ITA)	2
Kamilė Gaučaitė (LTU)	0
Martina Kuenz (AUT)	11
Pauline Lecarpentier (FRA)	2
Yasemin Adar (TUR)	6

Quarterfinals
Vasilisa Marzaliuk (BLR)	3
Alla Belinska (UKR)	1
Georgina Nelthorpe (GBR)	5
Mariya Oryashkova (BUL)	8
Natalia Vorobieva (ROC)	10^{F}
Iselin Moen Solheim (NOR)	4
Martina Kuenz (AUT)	9^{F}
Yasemin Adar (TUR)	5

Semifinals
Vasilisa Marzaliuk (BLR)	5^{F}
Mariya Oryashkova (BUL)	0
Natalia Vorobieva (ROC)	2
Martina Kuenz (AUT)	1

Final
Vasilisa Marzaliuk (BLR)	0
Natalia Vorobieva (ROC)	2

Repechage round 1
Zsanett Németh (HUN)	4
Alla Belinska (UKR)	8
Natalia Strzałka (POL)
Iselin Moen Solheim (NOR)	WO

Bronze medals
Alla Belinska (UKR)	4
Mariya Oryashkova (BUL)	3
Iselin Moen Solheim (NOR)	2
Martina Kuenz (AUT)	10

== See also ==
- 2020 Pan American Wrestling Olympic Qualification Tournament
- 2021 African & Oceania Wrestling Olympic Qualification Tournament
- 2021 Asian Wrestling Olympic Qualification Tournament
- 2021 World Wrestling Olympic Qualification Tournament
