= Mykola Kuchmii =

Ukrainian Greco-Roman wrestler

Personal information
- Native name: Микола Кучмій

Sport
- Country: Ukraine
- Sport: Amateur wrestling
- Weight class: 130 kg
- Event: Greco-Roman
Medal record
Men's Greco-Roman wrestling
Representing Ukraine
European Championships
Bronze medal – third place	2020 Rome	130 kg
Individual World Cup
Bronze medal – third place	2020 Belgrade	130 kg
European Games
Bronze medal – third place	2019 Minsk	130 kg
World Military Championships
Bronze medal – third place	2025 Warendorf	130 kg

Mykola Kuchmii (Ukrainian: Микола Кучмій) is a Ukrainian Greco-Roman wrestler. He is a bronze medalist at the European Wrestling Championships.

== Career ==
Kuchmii represented Ukraine at the 2015 European Games in Baku, Azerbaijan. He competed in the 130 kg event where he lost his first match against Sabah Shariati of Azerbaijan. He was then eliminated by Iakob Kajaia of Georgia in the first match of the repechage. In June 2019, he lost his bronze medal match in the 130 kg event at the European Games held in Minsk, Belarus but he was awarded this medal in November of that year after the disqualification of gold medalist Kiryl Hryshchanka of Belarus.

In 2020, Kuchmii won one of the bronze medals in the 130 kg event at the European Wrestling Championships held in Rome, Italy. In that same year, he won one of the bronze medals in the 130 kg event at the 2020 Individual Wrestling World Cup held in Belgrade, Serbia.

In January 2021, Kuchmii won the silver medal in the 130 kg event at the Grand Prix Zagreb Open held in Zagreb, Croatia. In March 2021, he competed at the European Qualification Tournament in Budapest, Hungary hoping to qualify for the 2020 Summer Olympics in Tokyo, Japan. He did not qualify at this tournament and he also failed to qualify for the Olympics at the World Olympic Qualification Tournament held in Sofia, Bulgaria.

== Achievements ==
Year	Tournament	Venue	Result	Event
2019	European Games	Minsk, Belarus	3rd	Greco-Roman 130 kg
2020	European Championships	Rome, Italy	3rd	Greco-Roman 130 kg
