= 2022 U23 World Wrestling Championships – Men's Greco-Roman 130 kg =

Wrestling competitions

Men's Greco-Roman 130 kg at the 2022 U23 World Championships
- Venue: Pontevedra Municipal Sports Hall
- Dates: 17–18 October
- Competitors: 15 from 15 nations

Medalists
gold medal	Fatih Bozkurt	Turkey
silver medal	Mykhailo Vyshnyvetskyi	Ukraine
bronze medal	Dáriusz Vitek	Hungary
bronze medal	Ali Akbar Yousefi	Iran

The men's Greco-Roman 130 kilograms is a competition featured at the 2022 U23 World Wrestling Championships, and was held in Pontevedra, Spain on 17 and 18 October 2022. The qualification rounds were held on 17 October while medal matches were held on the 2nd day of the competition. A total of 15 wrestlers competed in this event, limited to athletes whose body weight was less than 130 kilograms.

This Greco-Roman wrestling competition consists of a single-elimination tournament, with a repechage used to determine the winner of two bronze medals. The two finalists face off for gold and silver medals. Each wrestler who loses to one of the two finalists moves into the repechage, culminating in a pair of bronze medal matches featuring the semifinal losers each facing the remaining repechage opponent from their half of the bracket.

== Results ==
Legend

- F — Won by fall

=== Main bracket ===
Round of 16
Fatih Bozkurt (TUR)	8
Marcel Albini (CZE)	0
Dáriusz Vitek (HUN)	5
Tomasz Wawrzyńczyk (POL)	0
Gerónimo Cámara (ESP)	0
Giorgi Tsopurashvili (GEO)	9
Cohlton Schultz (USA)	9
Jonovan Smith (PUR)	0
Damir Zuparov (KAZ)	0
Sarkhan Mammadov (AZE)	8
Mykhailo Vyshnyvetskyi (UKR)	4^{F}
Marin Nishimura (JPN)	0
Paúl Morales (MEX)	0
Ali Akbar Yousefi (IRI)	6

Quarterfinals
Nikolaos Ntounias (GRE)	0
Fatih Bozkurt (TUR)	8
Dáriusz Vitek (HUN)	4
Giorgi Tsopurashvili (GEO)	0
Cohlton Schultz (USA)	1
Sarkhan Mammadov (AZE)	5
Mykhailo Vyshnyvetskyi (UKR)	7
Ali Akbar Yousefi (IRI)	1

Semifinals
Fatih Bozkurt (TUR)	6
Dáriusz Vitek (HUN)	1
Sarkhan Mammadov (AZE)	3
Mykhailo Vyshnyvetskyi (UKR)	6

Final
Fatih Bozkurt (TUR)	9
Mykhailo Vyshnyvetskyi (UKR)	1

=== Repechage ===
Repechage round
Marcel Albini (CZE)	11
Nikolaos Ntounias (GRE)	13
Marin Nishimura (JPN)	0
Ali Akbar Yousefi (IRI)	4^{F}

Bronze medals
Nikolaos Ntounias (GRE)	2
Dáriusz Vitek (HUN)	12
Ali Akbar Yousefi (IRI)	9
Sarkhan Mammadov (AZE)	1

== Final standing ==
Rank	Athlete
1st place, gold medalist(s)	Fatih Bozkurt (TUR)
2nd place, silver medalist(s)	Mykhailo Vyshnyvetskyi (UKR)
3rd place, bronze medalist(s)	Dáriusz Vitek (HUN)
3rd place, bronze medalist(s)	Ali Akbar Yousefi (IRI)
5	Nikolaos Ntounias (GRE)
5	Sarkhan Mammadov (AZE)
7	Cohlton Schultz (USA)
8	Giorgi Tsopurashvili (GEO)
9	Marcel Albini (CZE)
10	Tomasz Wawrzyńczyk (POL)
11	Paúl Morales (MEX)
12	Damir Zuparov (KAZ)
13	Marin Nishimura (JPN)
14	Gerónimo Cámara (ESP)
15	Jonovan Smith (PUR)
