= Ali Akbar Yousefi (wrestler) =

Iranian Greco-Roman wrestler

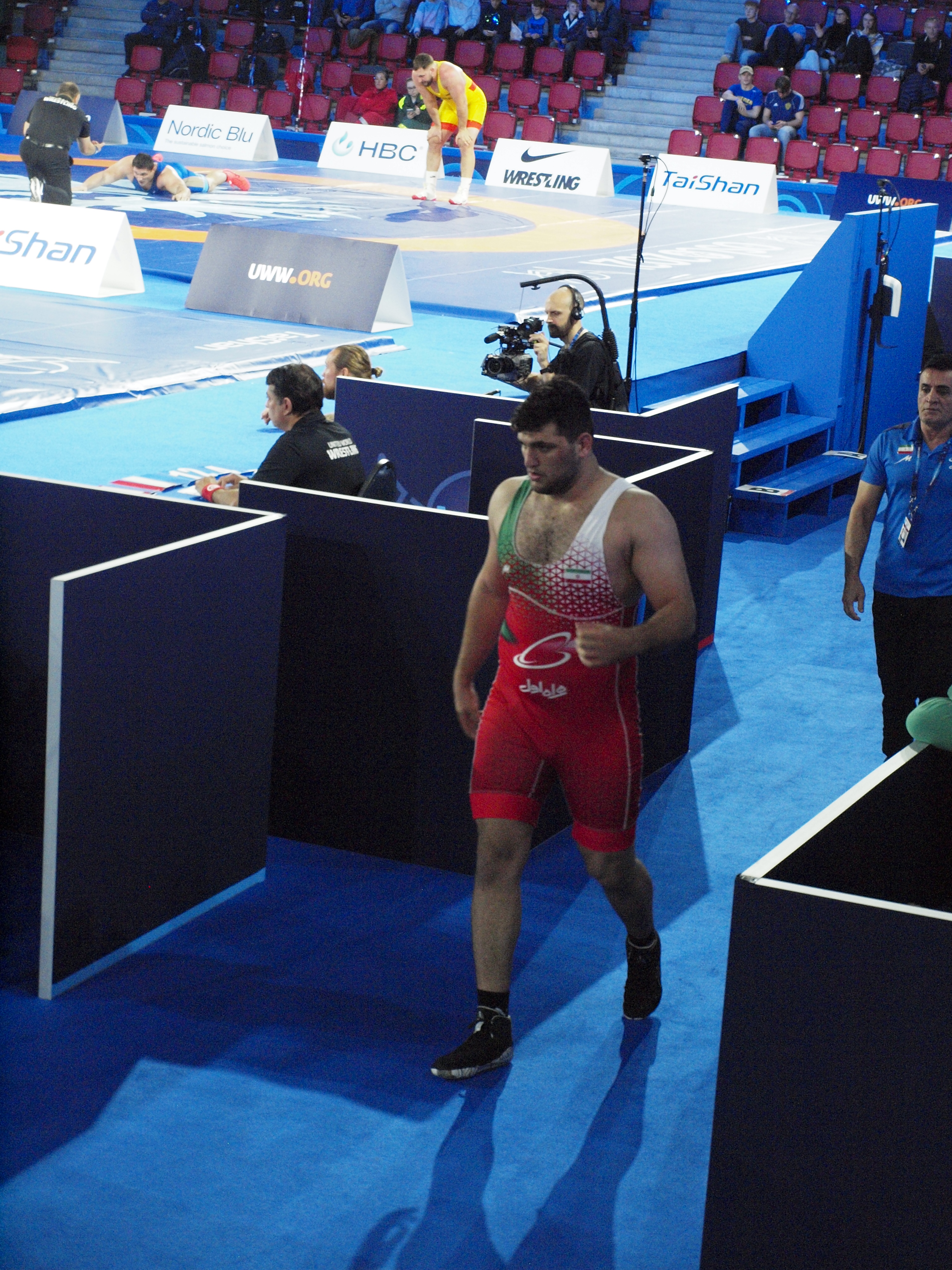

Personal information
- Native name: علی‌اکبر یوسفی
- Nationality: Iranian
- Born: 30 April 1997 (age 29) Babol, Mazandaran, Iran
- Website: Official Instagram Profile

Sport
- Country: Iran
- Sport: Greco-Roman wrestling
- Weight class: 130 kg
Medal record
Men's Greco-Roman wrestling
Representing Iran
World Championships
Gold medal – first place	2021 Oslo	130 kg
Asian Championships
Gold medal – first place	2021 Almaty	130 kg
Islamic Solidarity Games
Gold medal – first place	2021 Konya	130 kg
World Cup
Gold medal – first place	2022 Baku	Team
World Military Championships
Gold medal – first place	2023 Baku	130 kg
Grand Prix
Gold medal – first place	2025 Zagreb	130 kg
Bronze medal – third place	2022 Almaty	130 kg
Bronze medal – third place	2023 Budapest	130 kg
World U23 Championships
Gold medal – first place	2019 Budapest	130 kg
Bronze medal – third place	2018 Bucharest	130 kg
Bronze medal – third place	2022 Pontevedra	130 kg
World Junior Championship
Gold medal – first place	2019 Talin	130 kg
Asian U23 Championship
Silver medal – second place	2019 Ulaanbaatar	130 kg
Asian Junior Championship
Gold medal – first place	2019 Chonburi	130 kg

Ali Akbar Yousefi (Persian: علی‌اکبر یوسفی, born 30 April 1997) is an Iranian professional wrestler. He won gold medal in the 130 kg event at the 2021 World Wrestling Championships held in Oslo, Norway. In 2019, he won gold medal in the same event at the U23 World Wrestling Championships held in Budapest, Hungary and won bronze medal in 2018, U23.

By winning gold medal in 2021 Oslo, He became Iran's first-ever world champion in the heaviest Greco weight class in the World Wrestling Championships.
