= 2023 European Wrestling Championships – Men's Greco-Roman 130 kg =

Wrestling competition

Men's Greco-Roman 130 kg at the 2023 European Wrestling Championships
- Venue: Arena Zagreb
- Location: Zagreb, Croatia
- Dates: 21-22 April
- Competitors: 16

Medalists
gold medal	Rıza Kayaalp	Turkey
silver medal	Sabah Shariati	Azerbaijan
bronze medal	Iakobi Kajaia	Georgia
bronze medal	Oskar Marvik	Norway

The Men's Greco-Roman 130 kg is a competition featured at the 2023 European Wrestling Championships, and will held in Zagreb, Croatia on April 21 and 22.

== Results ==
Legend

- F — Won by fall

Round of 16
Alin Alexuc-Ciurariu (ROU)	3
Marcel Albini (CZE)	1
Sabah Shariati (AZE)	5
Dáriusz Vitek (HUN)	4
Delian Alishahi (SUI)	0
Mykhailo Vyshnyvetskyi (UKR)	5
Danila Sotnikov (ITA)	1
Iakobi Kajaia (GEO)	1
Mantas Knystautas (LTU)	3
Rafał Krajewski (POL)	1
David Ovasapyan (ARM)	2
Franz Richter (GER)	0
Oskar Marvik (NOR)	2
Elias Kuosmanen (FIN)	1
Boris Petrušić (SRB)	0
Rıza Kayaalp (TUR)	8

Quarterfinals
Alin Alexuc-Ciurariu (ROU)	3
Sabah Shariati (AZE)	9
Mykhailo Vyshnyvetskyi (UKR)	1
Iakobi Kajaia (GEO)	7^{F}
Mantas Knystautas (LTU)	5
David Ovasapyan (ARM)	4
Oskar Marvik (NOR)	0
Rıza Kayaalp (TUR)	8

Semifinals
Sabah Shariati (AZE)	1
Iakobi Kajaia (GEO)	1
Mantas Knystautas (LTU)	0
Rıza Kayaalp (TUR)	8

Final
Sabah Shariati (AZE)	1
Rıza Kayaalp (TUR)	2

Repechage round 1
Dáriusz Vitek (HUN)	2
Alin Alexuc-Ciurariu (ROU)	2
Boris Petrušić (SRB)	0
Oskar Marvik (NOR)	9

Bronze medal match
Alin Alexuc-Ciurariu (ROU)	1
Iakobi Kajaia (GEO)	1
Oskar Marvik (NOR)	7^{F}
Mantas Knystautas (LTU)	2

== Final standing ==
Rank	Athlete
1st place, gold medalist(s)	Rıza Kayaalp (TUR)
2nd place, silver medalist(s)	Sabah Shariati (AZE)
3rd place, bronze medalist(s)	Iakobi Kajaia (GEO)
3rd place, bronze medalist(s)	Oskar Marvik (NOR)
5	Alin Alexuc-Ciurariu (ROU)
5	Mantas Knystautas (LTU)
7	David Ovasapyan (ARM)
8	Mykhailo Vyshnyvetskyi (UKR)
9	Dáriusz Vitek (HUN)
10	Danila Sotnikov (ITA)
11	Elias Kuosmanen (FIN)
12	Marcel Albini (CZE)
13	Rafał Krajewski (POL)
14	Franz Richter (GER)
15	Delian Alishahi (SUI)
16	Boris Petrušić (SRB)
