= 2021 Grand Prix Zagreb Open =

- Host city: Zagreb, Croatia
- Dates: 16–17 January 2021
- Stadium: Dom Sportova

The 2021 Grand Prix Zagreb Open, was a wrestling event held in Zagreb, Croatia between 16 and 17 January 2021.

== Team ranking ==
Rank	Men's Greco-Roman	
Rank	Team	Points
1	Turkey	122
2	Sweden	108
3	Ukraine	95
4	Uzbekistan	94
5	Poland	91
6	Germany	81
7	Lithuania	71
8	Moldova	69
9	Finland	60
10	Croatia	50

=== Medal table ===
Rank	Nation	Gold	Silver	Bronze	Total
1	Turkey	2	2	4	8
2	Ukraine	2	1	1	4
2	Uzbekistan	2	1	1	4
4	Sweden	1	3	1	5
5	Finland	1	0	2	3
5	Moldova	1	0	2	3
5	Poland	1	0	2	3
8	Germany	0	1	3	4
9	Lithuania	0	1	1	2
10	Norway	0	1	0	1
11	Italy	0	0	1	1
11	Serbia	0	0	1	1
Totals (12 entries)		10	10	19	39

=== Greco-Roman ===
Event	Gold	Silver	Bronze
55 kg	(Uzbekistan) Jasurbek Ortikboev	(Uzbekistan) Ilkhom Bakhromov	(Germany) Fabian Schmitt
60 kg	(Uzbekistan) Islomjon Bakhramov	(Turkey) Ahmet Uyar	(Sweden) Ardit Fazlija
60 kg	(Uzbekistan) Islomjon Bakhramov	(Turkey) Ahmet Uyar	(Uzbekistan) Firuz Tukhtaev
63 kg	(Moldova) Victor Ciobanu	(Sweden) Niklas Öhlén	(Serbia) Perica Dimitrijevic
63 kg	(Moldova) Victor Ciobanu	(Sweden) Niklas Öhlén	(Germany) Andrej Ginc
67 kg	(Poland) Gevorg Sahakyan	(Norway) Morten Thoresen	(Turkey) Hacı Karakuş
67 kg	(Poland) Gevorg Sahakyan	(Norway) Morten Thoresen	(Moldova) Donior Islamov
72 kg	(Ukraine) Parviz Nasibov	(Turkey) Ahmet Yılmaz	(Finland) Mikko Peltokangas
72 kg	(Ukraine) Parviz Nasibov	(Turkey) Ahmet Yılmaz	(Poland) Mateusz Bernatek
77 kg	(Turkey) Furkan Bayrak	(Sweden) Lukas Ahlgren	(Germany) Michael Widmayer
77 kg	(Turkey) Furkan Bayrak	(Sweden) Lukas Ahlgren	(Italy) Riccardo Vito Abbrescia
82 kg	(Sweden) Alex Kessidis	(Germany) Hannes Wagner	(Moldova) Gabriel Lupasco
82 kg	(Sweden) Alex Kessidis	(Germany) Hannes Wagner	(Ukraine) Yaroslav Filchakov
87 kg	(Ukraine) Zhan Beleniuk	(Sweden) Aleksandar Stjepanetic	(Turkey) Ali Cengiz
87 kg	(Ukraine) Zhan Beleniuk	(Sweden) Aleksandar Stjepanetic	(Turkey) Doğan Göktaş
97 kg	(Finland) Arvi Savolainen	(Lithuania) Vilius Laurinaitis	(Poland) Tadeusz Michalik
97 kg	(Finland) Arvi Savolainen	(Lithuania) Vilius Laurinaitis	(Finland) Elias Kuosmanen
130 kg	(Turkey) Osman Yıldırım	(Ukraine) Mykola Kuchmii	(Lithuania) Mantas Knystautas
130 kg	(Turkey) Osman Yıldırım	(Ukraine) Mykola Kuchmii	(Turkey) Hamza Bakır

== Participating nations ==
147 competitors from 18 nations participated.

- Croatia (15)
- Czech Republic (4)
- Estonia (3)
- Finland (11)
- Germany (12)
- Greece (2)
- Italy (13)
- Lithuania (10)
- Moldova (8)
- Norway (4)
- Poland (11)
- Serbia (2)
- Switzerland (9)
- Sweden (10)
- Turkey (10)
- Ukraine (10)
- United States (1)
- Uzbekistan (12)
