= Alin Alexuc-Ciurariu =

Romanian Greco-Roman wrestler

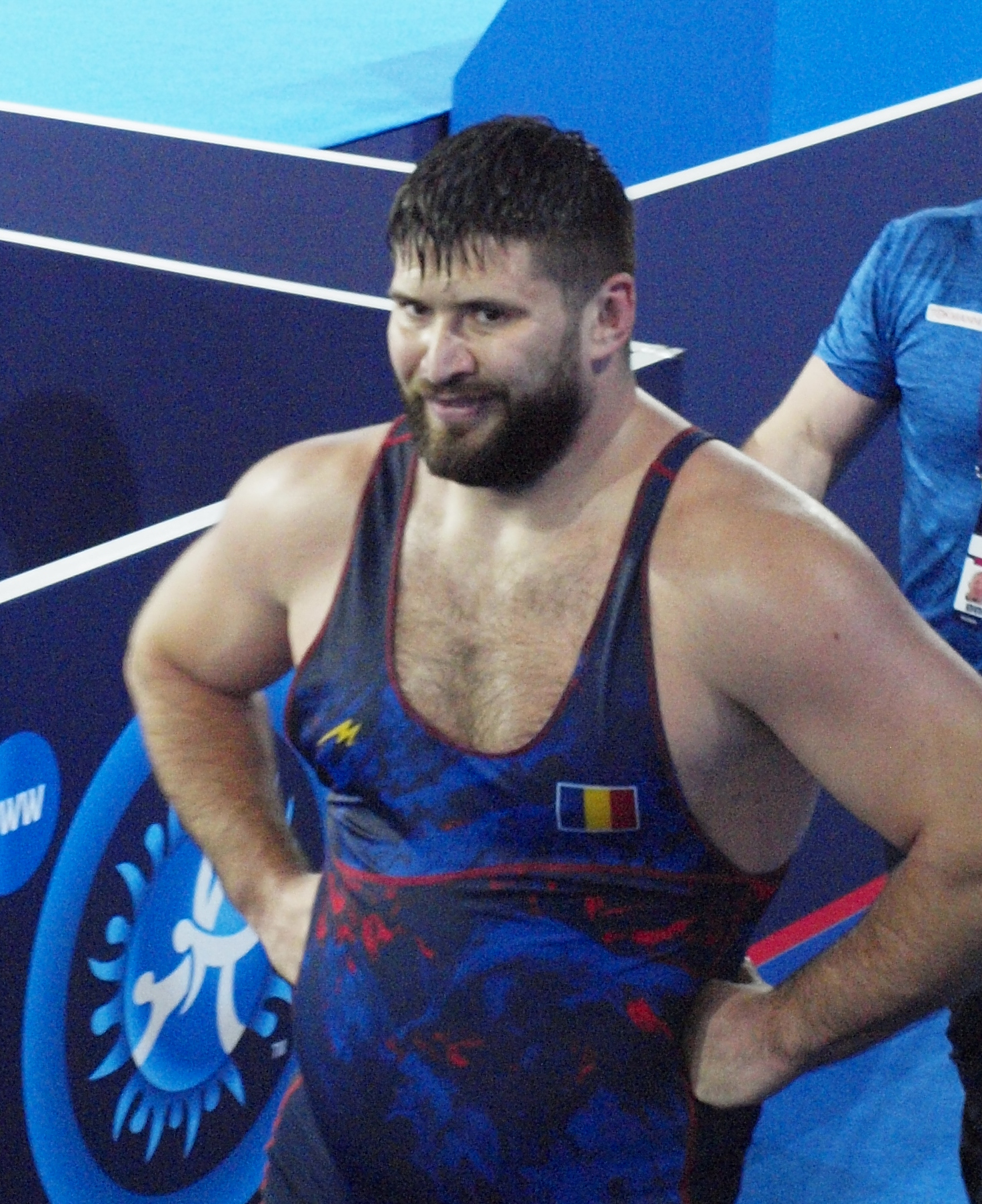
- Alexuc-Ciurariu in 2021

Personal information
- Nationality: Romania
- Born: 3 February 1990 (age 36) Botoşani, Romania
- Height: 1.91 m (6 ft 3 in)
- Weight: 130 kg (287 lb)

Sport
- Sport: Wrestling
- Event: Greco-Roman
- Club: CS Botoşani
- Coached by: Victor Baciu
Medal record
World Championships
Bronze medal – third place	2022 Belgrade	130 kg
European Championships
Gold medal – first place	2020 Rome	130 kg
Bronze medal – third place	2018 Kaspiysk	130 kg
Bronze medal – third place	2019 Bucharest	130 kg
Vehbi Emre & Hamit Kaplan
Silver medal – second place	2014 Istanbul	98 kg
Bronze medal – third place	2015 Istanbul	98 kg
Dan Kolov & Nikola Petrov
Gold medal – first place	2015 Sofia	125 kg
Gold medal – first place	2017 Russe	130 kg
Gold medal – first place	2022 Tarnovo	130 kg
Bronze medal – third place	2014 Sofia	98 kg
Bronze medal – third place	2018 Sofia	130 kg
Golden Grand Prix
Bronze medal – third place	2013 Szombathely	120 kg
Grand Prix
Gold medal – first place	2012 Targoviste	120 kg
Gold medal – first place	2015 Bucharest	130 kg
Gold medal – first place	2017 Kragujevac	130 kg
Gold medal – first place	2019 Haparanda	130 kg
Gold medal – first place	2019 Ilmajoki	130 kg
Gold medal – first place	2022 Tirana	130 kg
Silver medal – second place	2011 Sassari	120 kg
Silver medal – second place	2016 Belgrade	130 kg
Silver medal – second place	2017 Bucharest	130 kg
Silver medal – second place	2018 Bucharest	130 kg
Silver medal – second place	2019 Mladenovac	130 kg
Silver medal – second place	2023 Alexandria	130 kg
Bronze medal – third place	2015 Szombathely	98 kg
Bronze medal – third place	2017 Kyiv	130 kg
Bronze medal – third place	2017 Zagreb	130 kg
Bronze medal – third place	2018 Zagreb	130 kg
Bronze medal – third place	2018 Tallinn	130 kg
Bronze medal – third place	2018 Gyoer	130 kg
Bronze medal – third place	2022 Warsaw	130 kg
Bronze medal – third place	2024 Nykoebing	130 kg
Bronze medal – third place	2024 Budapest	130 kg
World University Championship
Bronze medal – third place	2014 Pécs	98 kg
World Juniors Championships
Silver medal – second place	2009 Budapest	96 kg

Alin Alexuc-Ciurariu (born February 3, 1990) is an amateur Romanian Greco-Roman wrestler, who competes in the men's heavyweight category. He won one of the bronze medals in the 130 kg event at the 2022 World Wrestling Championships held in Belgrade, Serbia. He is a member of CS Botoşani for the wrestling division, and is coached and trained by Victor Baciu.

== Career ==
Alexuc-Ciurariu represented Romania at the 2012 Summer Olympics in London, where he competed in the men's 96 kg class. He lost the qualifying match to Albanian-born Bulgarian wrestler Elis Guri, who was able to score one point each in two straight periods, leaving Alexuc-Ciurariu without a single point.

At the 2016 Summer Olympics, he beat Hamdy El-Said before losing to Artur Aleksanyan in the quarter-final. As Aleksanyan reached the final, Alexuc-Ciurariu was entered into the repechage, where he beat Daigoro Timoncini in a shut out, before losing in his bronze medal match to Cenk İldem.

At the 2018 European Championships, he competed in the 130 kg division. He beat Stepan David and Mantas Knystautas before losing to Rıza Kayaalp. As Kayaalp reached the final, Alexuc-Ciurariu was entered into the repechage. There, he won his bronze medal match against Bálint Lám.

In March 2021, he competed at the European Qualification Tournament in Budapest, Hungary hoping to qualify for the 2020 Summer Olympics in Tokyo, Japan. He competed in the men's 130 kg event.

In 2022, he competed in the 130 kg event at the European Wrestling Championships in Budapest, Hungary. He lost his bronze medal match in the 130 kg event at the 2023 European Wrestling Championships held in Zagreb, Croatia.

He competed at the 2024 European Wrestling Olympic Qualification Tournament in Baku, Azerbaijan hoping to qualify for the 2024 Summer Olympics in Paris, France. He was eliminated in his third match and he did not qualify for the Olympics. A month later, he earned a quota place for Romania for the Olympics at the 2024 World Wrestling Olympic Qualification Tournament held in Istanbul, Turkey. He competed in the 130 kg event at the Olympics.
