= Iakobi Kajaia =

Georgian Greco-Roman wrestler

Iakob Kajaia
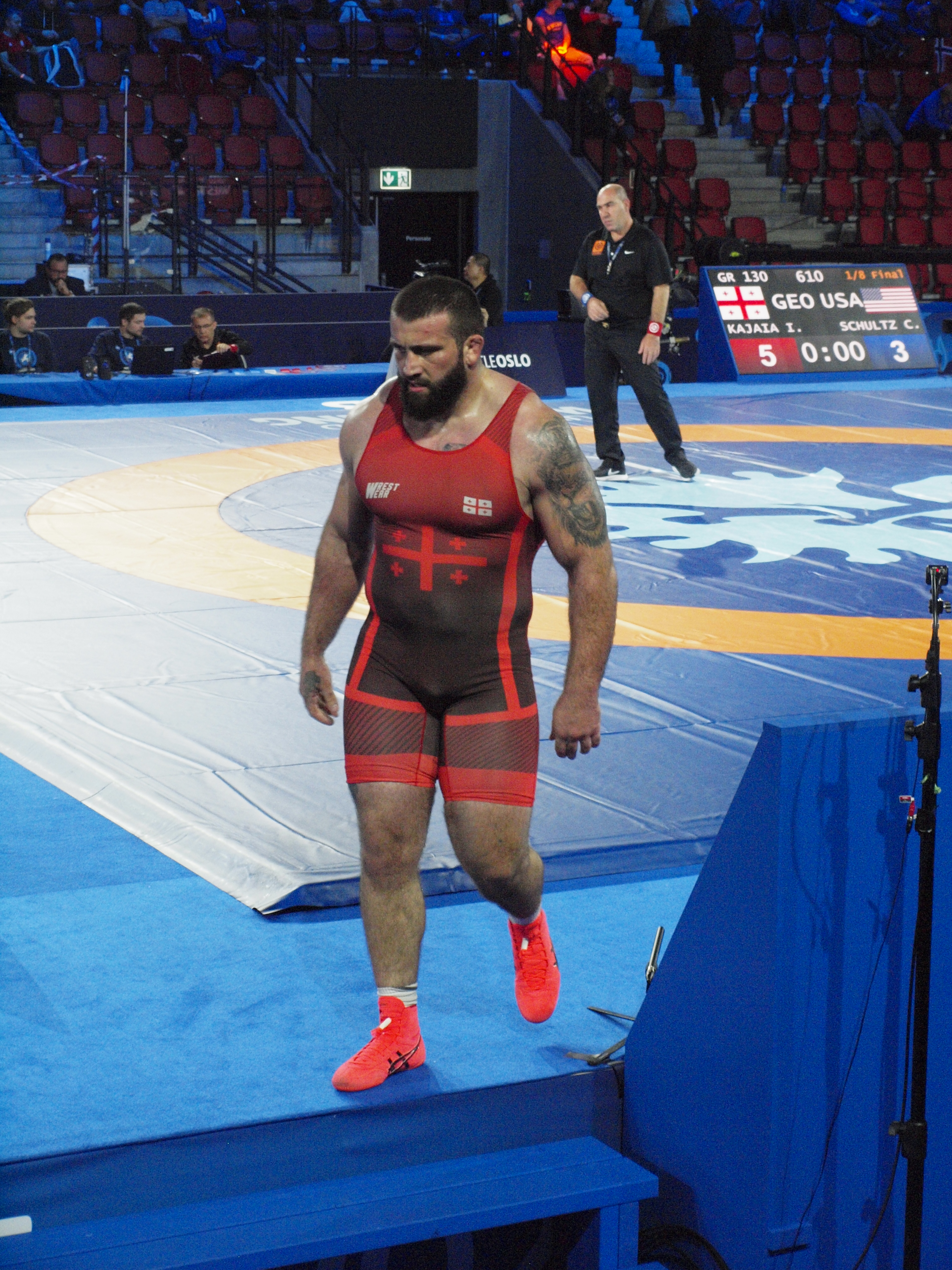
- Kajaia in 2021

Personal information
- Nationality: Georgian
- Born: 28 September 1993 (age 32) Tsqaltubo, Georgia
- Height: 1.87 m (6 ft 2 in)
- Weight: 127 kg (280 lb)

Sport
- Sport: Wrestling
- Event: Greco-Roman
Medal record
Men's Greco-Roman wrestling
Representing Georgia
Olympic Games
Silver medal – second place	2020 Tokyo	130 kg
World Championships
Bronze medal – third place	2019 Nur-Sultan	130 kg
Bronze medal – third place	2021 Oslo	130 kg
European Championships
Silver medal – second place	2021 Warsaw	130 kg
Silver medal – second place	2019 Bucharest	130 kg
Bronze medal – third place	2018 Kaspiysk	130 kg
Bronze medal – third place	2023 Zagreb	130 kg
European Games
Gold medal – first place	2019 Minsk	130 kg
Golden Grand Prix
Gold medal – first place	2014 Baku	120 kg
Gold medal – first place	2014 Paris	120 kg
Silver medal – second place	2013 Baku	120 kg
Grand Prix
Gold medal – first place	2017 Tbilisi	130 kg
Gold medal – first place	2018 Dortmund	130 kg
Gold medal – first place	2021 Kyiv	130 kg
Bronze medal – third place	2018 Kyiv	130 kg
European U23 Championship
Gold medal – first place	2016 Russe	130 kg
World Juniors Championships
Silver medal – second place	2012 Pattaya	96 kg
European Juniors Championships
Gold medal – first place	2013 Skopje	120 kg
Bronze medal – third place	2012 Zagreb	96 kg
European Cadets Championships
Silver medal – second place	2010 Sarajevo	110 kg

Iakob Kajaia (Georgian: იაკობ ქაჯაია; born 28 September 1993) is a Georgian Greco-Roman wrestler.

== Wrestling career ==
Iakobi Kajaia competed in the men's Greco-Roman 130 kg event at the 2016 Summer Olympics, in which he was eliminated in the quarterfinals by Sergey Semenov. He is a European bronze medallist (2018).

He lost his bronze medal match in the 130 kg event at the 2022 World Wrestling Championships held in Belgrade, Serbia. He won one of the bronze medals in the 130 kg event at the 2023 European Wrestling Championships held in Zagreb, Croatia.

The Anti-Doping Division of the Court of Arbitration for Sport has confirmed that Georgian wrestler Iakobi Kajaia committed an anti-doping rule violation (ADRV) and sanctioned him with two years of ineligibility, as well as the disqualification of all results obtained from 6 January 2024.

== Major results ==
Year	Tournament	Venue	Result	Event
2014	World Championships	Tashkent, Uzbekistan	10th	Greco-Roman 130 kg
2015	European Games	Baku, Azerbaijan	5th	Greco-Roman 130 kg
2015	World Championships	Las Vegas, United States	24th	Greco-Roman 130 kg
2016	European Championships	Riga, Latvia	9th	Greco-Roman 130 kg
2016	Olympic Games	Rio de Janeiro, Brazil	7th	Greco-Roman 130 kg
2018	European Championships	Kaspiysk, Russia	3rd	Greco-Roman 130 kg
2019	European Championships	Bucharest, Romania	2nd	Greco-Roman 130 kg
2019	European Games	Minsk, Belarus	1st	Greco-Roman 130 kg
2019	World Championships	Nur-Sultan, Kazakhstan	3rd	Greco-Roman 130 kg
2021	Olympic Games	Tokyo, Japan	2nd	Greco-Roman 130 kg
2021	World Championships	Oslo, Norway	3rd	Greco-Roman 130 kg
2023	European Championships	Zagreb, Croatia	3rd	Greco-Roman 130 kg
