= Oskar Marvik =

Norwegian Greco-Roman wrestler

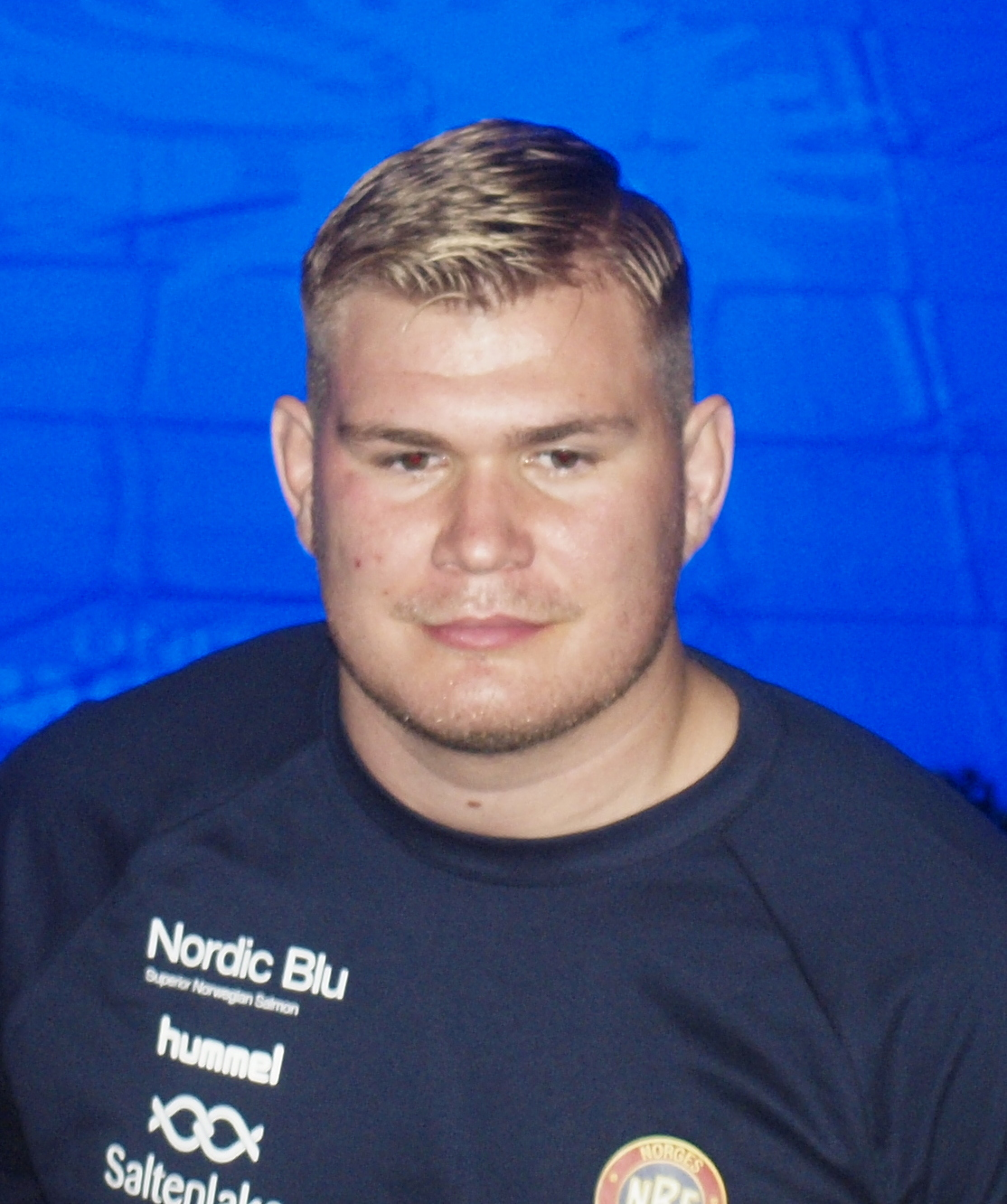
- Marvik in 2021

Personal information
- Born: 22 November 1995 (age 30)
- Height: 192 cm (6 ft 4 in)

Sport
- Country: Norway
- Sport: Amateur wrestling
- Weight class: 130 kg
- Event: Greco-Roman
Medal record
Men's Greco-Roman wrestling
Representing Norway
World Championships
| Bronze medal – third place | 2021 Oslo | 130 kg |
European Championships
| Bronze medal – third place | 2023 Zagreb | 130 kg |

Oskar Marvik (born 22 November 1995) is a Norwegian Greco-Roman wrestler. He is a World Championships and European Championships bronze medallist in the 130 kg category. Marvik won a bronze medal in the Greco-Roman 130 kg event at the 2021 World Championships in Oslo and the Greco-Roman 130 kg event at the 2023 European Championships in Zagreb.

== Career ==
Marvik won a bronze medal in the Greco-Roman 130 kg event at the 2021 World Championships in Oslo. In 2022, he lost his bronze medal match in his event at the Matteo Pellicone Ranking Series 2022 held in Rome. He competed in the 130 kg event at the 2022 World Championships held in Belgrade. Marvik won one of the bronze medals in the 130 kg event at the 2023 European Championships held in Zagreb. He defeated Mantas Knystautas of Lithuania in his bronze medal match.

Marvik competed at the 2024 European Wrestling Olympic Qualification Tournament in Baku hoping to qualify for the 2024 Summer Olympics in Paris. He was eliminated in his first match and he did not qualify for the Olympics. Marvik competed at the 2024 World Wrestling Olympic Qualification Tournament held in Istanbul, without qualifying for the Olympics.

== Achievements ==
| Year | Tournament | Location | Result | Event |
|---|---|---|---|---|
| 2021 | World Championships | Oslo, Norway | 3rd | Greco-Roman 130 kg |
| 2023 | European Championships | Zagreb, Croatia | 3rd | Greco-Roman 130 kg |
