= Sergey Semenov (wrestler) =

Russian Greco-Roman wrestler

Sergey Semenov Сергей Семёнов
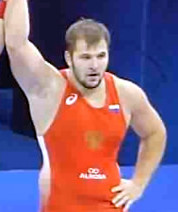
- Semyonov in 2018

Personal information
- Full name: Sergey Viktorovich Semenov
- Nationality: Russian
- Born: 10 August 1995 (age 31) Tula, Russia
- Height: 1.87 m (6 ft 2 in)
- Weight: 130 kg (287 lb)

Sport
- Country: Russia
- Sport: Wrestling
- Event: Greco-Roman
- Club: Sparta
- Coached by: Vladimir Ushakov, Valery Zhukov
Medal record
Men's Greco-Roman wrestling
Representing Individual Neutral Athletes
European Championships
Gold medal – first place	2024 Bucharest	130 kg
Representing United World Wrestling
European Championships
Gold medal – first place	2025 Bratislava	130 kg
Representing (Russia) ROC
Olympic Games
Bronze medal – third place	2020 Tokyo	130 kg
Representing Russia
Olympic Games
Bronze medal – third place	2016 Rio de Janeiro	130 kg
World Championships
Gold medal – first place	2018 Budapest	130 kg
Individual World Cup
Gold medal – first place	2020 Belgrade	130 kg
European Games
Silver medal – second place	2019 Minsk	130 kg
European Championships
Bronze medal – third place	2019 Bucharest	130 kg
World Cup
Gold medal – first place	2017 Abadan	130 kg
Silver medal – second place	2015 Tehran	130 kg
Silver medal – second place	2016 Tehran	130 kg
Golden Grand Prix Ivan Poddubny
Bronze medal – third place	2016 Tyumen	130 kg
World U23 Championships
Gold medal – first place	2017 Bydgoszcz	130 kg
World Juniors Championships
Gold medal – first place	2013 Sofia	120 kg
Gold medal – first place	2014 Zagreb	120 kg
Silver medal – second place	2015 Salvador da Bahia	120 kg

Sergey Viktorovich Semenov (Russian: Сергей Викторович Семёнов, IPA: [sʲɪrˈɡʲej sʲɪˈmʲɵnəf]; born 10 August 1995) is a Russian Greco-Roman wrestler. 2018 senior world champion. 2x Olympic bronze medalist, 2024 European champion, 2017 World Cup winner, 2017 U23 World champion.

In 2020, he won the gold medal in the 130 kg event at the Individual Wrestling World Cup held in Belgrade, Serbia. In March 2021, he qualified at the European Qualification Tournament to compete at the 2020 Summer Olympics in Tokyo, Japan. He won one of the bronze medals in the 130 kg event.

He won the gold medal in the 130 kg event at the 2024 European Wrestling Championships held in Bucharest, Romania. In the final, he defeated Rıza Kayaalp of Turkey. He competed at the 2024 European Wrestling Olympic Qualification Tournament in Baku, Azerbaijan and he earned a quota place for the Individual Neutral Athletes for the 2024 Summer Olympics in Paris, France.
