= Sabah Shariati =

Azerbaijani Greco-Roman wrestler

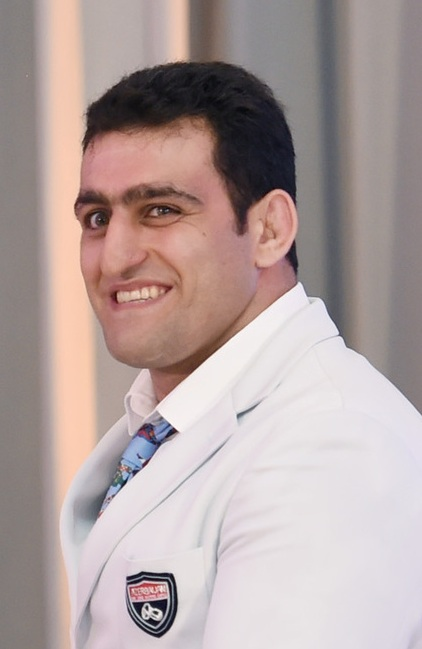
- Shariati in 2016

Personal information
- Native name: صباح شریعتی
- Full name: Sabah Saleh Shariati
- Nationality: Iranian/Azerbaijan
- Born: 1 January 1989 (age 37) Sanandaj, Iran
- Height: 192 cm (6 ft 4 in)
- Weight: 130 kg (287 lb)

Sport
- Country: Azerbaijan
- Style: Greco-Roman
Medal record
Men's Greco-Roman wrestling
Representing Azerbaijan
Olympic Games
Bronze medal – third place	2016 Rio de Janeiro	130 kg
European Championships
Silver medal – second place	2023 Zagreb	130 kg
European Games
Silver medal – second place	2015 Baku	130 kg
Bronze medal – third place	2019 Minsk	130 kg
Islamic Solidarity Games
Bronze medal – third place	2017 Baku	130 kg
Bronze medal – third place	2021 Konya	130 kg
World Cup
Gold medal – first place	2015 Tehran	Team

Sabah Saleh Shariati (Persian: صباح شریعتی, Azerbaijani: Sabah Saleh oğlu Şəriəti; born 1 January 1989 in Sanandaj, Kurdistan province, Iran) is an Iranian-born naturalized Azerbaijani Greco-Roman wrestler. He won bronze in the 2016 Rio Olympics, losing in the 130 kg event to eventual silver medalist and 4 time world champion Riza Kayaalp of Turkey.

He competed in the 130 kg event at the 2022 World Wrestling Championships held in Belgrade, Serbia.

He lost his bronze medal match in the 130 kg event at the 2024 Summer Olympics in Paris, France.

He was given a hero send off by Amin Mirzazadeh of Iran after losing his bronze medal bout in 2024 Paris Olympics.

== Career in Iran ==
He won an Iranian national youth medal in 2005 freestyle competitions. Representing Iran, in 2009 he won the 120 kg Greco Roman gold medal in Baku's international tournament.
