= Mantas Knystautas =

Lithuanian wrestler (born 1994)

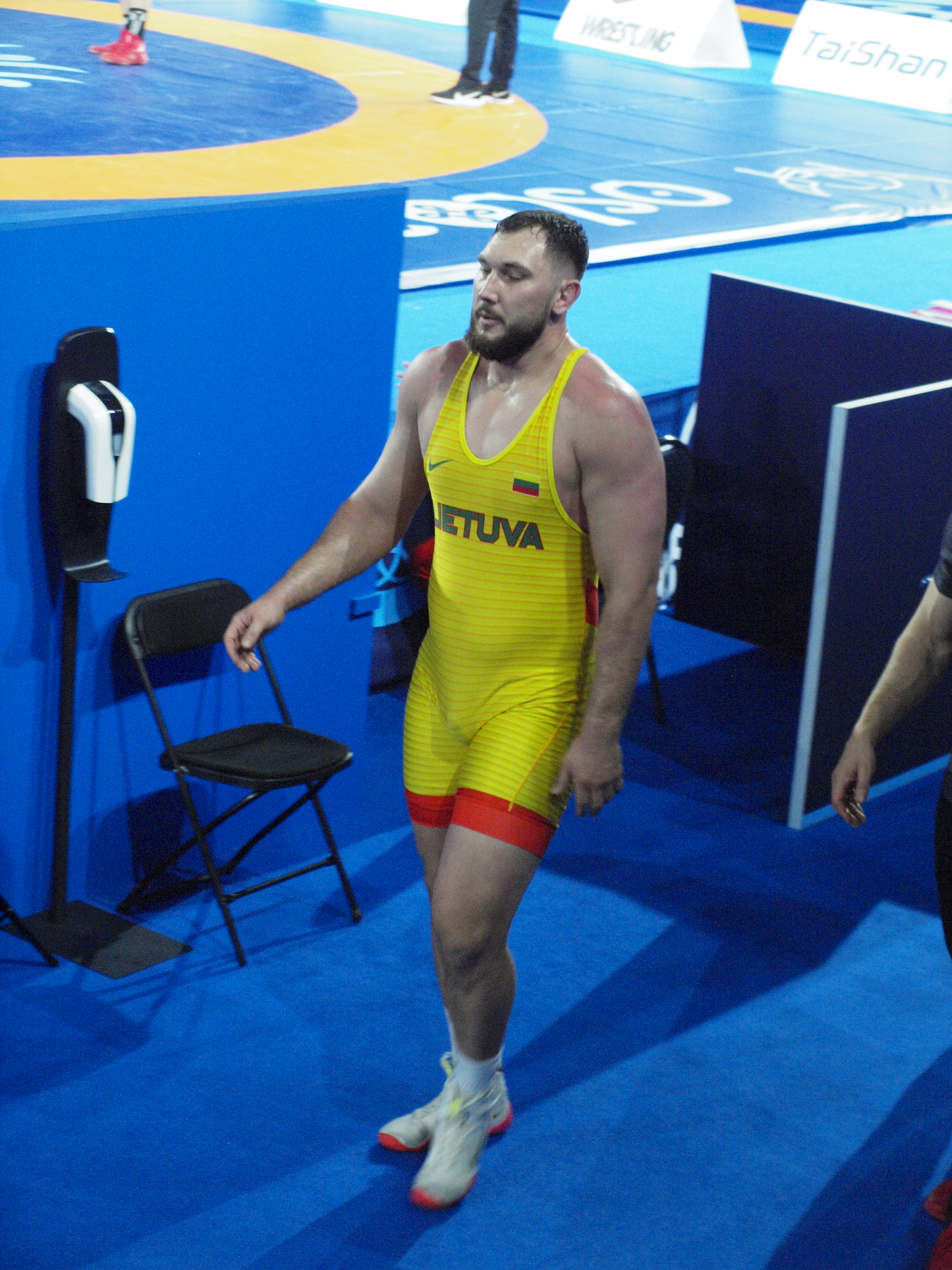
- Knystautas at 2021 World championships

Personal information
- Born: 20 May 1994 (age 32)
Medal record
Men's Greco-Roman wrestling
Representing Lithuania
World Championships
Bronze medal – third place	2022 Belgrade	130 kg
World Military Championships
Silver medal – second place	2025 Warendorf	130 kg
Grand Prix
Gold medal – first place	2022 Dortmund	130 kg
Gold medal – first place	2022 Warsaw	130 kg
Gold medal – first place	2025 Druskininkai	130 kg
Silver medal – second place	2026 Nice	130 kg
Bronze medal – third place	2021 Zagreb	130 kg
Bronze medal – third place	2022 Rome	130 kg
Bronze medal – third place	2024 Zagreb	130 kg
World U23 Championships
Bronze medal – third place	2017 Bydgoszcz	130 kg
European U23 Championship
Silver medal – second place	2017 Szombathely	130 kg
Bronze medal – third place	2016 Russe	130 kg
World Juniors Championships
Silver medal – second place	2014 Zagreb	120 kg
Representing All-World Team
World Cup
Bronze medal – third place	2022 Baku	Team

Mantas Knystautas (born 20 May 1994) is a Lithuanian wrestler, who competes in the men's 130 kg Greco-Roman division. He won one of the bronze medals in the 130 kg event at the 2022 World Wrestling Championships held in Belgrade, Serbia.

== Biography ==
Mantas was born in Klaipėda, Lithuania.

Knystautas has competed 2015 European Games, but lost his first fight. Knystautas started at the 2017 World championships, but lost his first fight. Same year he won bronze at the World U23 Championships.

At the 2021 European Wrestling Olympic Qualification Tournament Knystautas reached the final and qualified for 2020 Summer Olympics.

In 2022, Knystautas competed in the 130 kg event at the European Wrestling Championships in Budapest, Hungary. He won one of the bronze medals in his event at the Matteo Pellicone Ranking Series 2022 held in Rome, Italy.

He lost his bronze medal match in the 130 kg event at the 2023 European Wrestling Championships held in Zagreb, Croatia.

He competed in the 130 kg event at the 2024 Summer Olympics in Paris, France.
