= 2014 FILA Wrestling World Cup – Men's Greco-Roman =

Men's Greco-Roman at the 2014 Wrestling World Cup
- Venue: Azadi Indoor Stadium
- Location: Tehran, Iran
- Dates: 15–16 May

Medalists
| gold medal | Iran |
| silver medal | Russia |
| bronze medal | Azerbaijan |

The 2014 FILA Wrestling World Cup – Men's Greco-Roman was the third of a set of three FILA Wrestling World Cups in 2014 – one for each major discipline. The event took place in Tehran, Iran at Shohadaye haftom Tir Indoor Stadium May 15 and 16, 2014. The competition was originally scheduled for Tyumen, Russia in February 2014, but was moved to avoid a conflict with the 2014 Winter Olympics.

== Pool stage ==
| Team competes for 1st place |
| Team competes for 3rd place |
| Team competes for 5th place |
| Team competes for 7th place |
| Team competes for 9th place |

=== Pool A ===
| Team | Pld | W | L | TF | PF | PA |
|---|---|---|---|---|---|---|
| Russia | 4 | 4 | 0 | 13 | 105 | 197 |
| Hungary | 4 | 3 | 1 | 5 | 80 | 112 |
| Kazakhstan | 4 | 2 | 2 | 4 | 45 | 109 |
| Turkey | 4 | 1 | 3 | 4 | 52 | 143 |
| United States | 4 | 0 | 4 | 0 | 0 | 0 |

POOL A
Round I

Turkey 5 - United States 3
59 kg – Şerif Kılıç (TUR) def. Ryan Magno (USA), 7-0
66 kg – Ravaughn Perkins (USA) def. Enes Başar (TUR)by FALL
71 kg – Yunus Özel (TUR) def. Patrick Smith (USA), 8-0
75 kg – Andrew Bisek(USA) def. Furkan Bayrak (TUR), 6-0
80 kg – Selçuk Çebi (TUR) def Geordan SPeiller (USA), 6-0
85 kg – Jordan Holm (USA) def. Metehan Başar (TUR) via DQ
98 kg – Süleyman Demirci (TUR) def. Darren Burns (USA) by TF, 12-4
130 kg – Atilla Güzel (TUR) def. Robert Smith (USA), 6-5

Russia 5 - Hungary 3
59 kg – Mingiyan Semenov (RUS) def. Csongor Knipli (HUN)by TF, 10-0
66 kg – Adam Kurak (RUS) def. Krisztián Jager (HUN)by TF, 8-0
71 kg – Bálint Korpási (HUN) def. Abuyazid Mantsigov (RUS), 2-1
75 kg –Roman Vlasov (RUS) def. László Szabó (HUN)by TF, 8-0
80 kg – Imil Sharafetdinov (RUS) def Gábor Madaras (HUN)by TF, 10-1
85 kg – Viktor Lőrincz (HUN) def. Azamat Bikbaev (RUS), by DQ
98 kg – Balázs Kiss (HUN) def. Nikita Melnikov (RUS), 4-0
130 kg – Vasily Parshin (RUS) def. Bálint Lám (HUN), 3-1

Round II

Hungary 8 - United States 0
59 kg – Csongor Knipli (HUN) def. Ryan Magno (USA), 4-2
66 kg – Krisztián Jager (HUN) def. Ravaughn Perkins (USA), 6-3
71 kg – Bálint Korpási (HUN) def. Patrick Smith (USA)by TF, 12-4
75 kg –László Szabó (HUN) def. Andrew Bisek (USA), 4-3
80 kg – Gábor Madaras (HUN) def Geordan Speiller (USA)by TF, 9-0
85 kg – Viktor Lőrincz (HUN) def. Jordan Holm (USA), 3-1
98 kg – Balázs Kiss (HUN) def. Darren Burns (USA) by DQ
130 kg – Bálint Lám (HUN) def. Robert Smith (USA), 5-4

Russia 8 - Kazakhstan 0
59 kg – Mingiyan Semenov (RUS) def. Daulet Absalimov (KAZ), 4-0
66 kg – Artem Surkov (RUS) def. Askhat Zhabirov (KAZ), 4-0
71 kg – Chingiz Labazanov (RUS) def. Demeu Zhadrayev (KAZ), 5-0
75 kg – Evgeny Saleev (RUS) def. Askhat Dilmukhamedov (KAZ), 9-8
80 kg – Evgeni Bogomolov (RUS) def. Danyal Gajiyev (KAZ), 3-0
85 kg – Davit Chakvetadze (RUS) def. Alkhazur Ozdiyev (KAZ), 4-0
98 kg – Rustam Totrov (RUS) def. Ilya Nastochenko (KAZ), by TF, 9-0
130 kg – Vitaly Ilnitsky (RUS) def. Yessenkeidi Zhalgasbayev (KAZ)by FALL

Round III

Russia 7 - Turkey 1
59 kg – Mingiyan Semenov (RUS) def. Şerif Kılıç (TUR)by TF, 9-0
66 kg – Adam Kurak (RUS) def. Enes Başar (TUR)by TF, 9-0
71 kg – Chingiz Labazanov (RUS) def. Yunus Özel (TUR), 7-2
75 kg – Roman Vlasov (RUS) def. Furkan Bayrak (TUR)by TF, 10-0
80 kg – Selçuk Çebi (TUR) def. Imil Sharafetdinov (RUS), 1-1
85 kg – Azamat Bikbaev (RUS) def. İldem Kansu (TUR), 6-1
98 kg – Nikita Melnikov (RUS) def. Süleyman Demirci (TUR)via five-point throw
130 kg – Vasily Parshin (RUS) def. Atilla Güzel (TUR), 1-0

Hungary 4.df - Kazakhstan 4
59 kg – Daulet Absalimov (KAZ) def. Csongor Knipli (HUN), 6-1
66 kg – Askhat Zhabirov (KAZ) def. Krisztián Jager (HUN), 2-0
71 kg – Bálint Korpasi (HUN) def. Demeu Zhadrayev (KAZ), 3-0
75 kg –Askhat Dilmukhamedov (KAZ) def. László Szabó (HUN), 4-0
80 kg – Danyal Gajiyev (KAZ) def Gábor Madaras (HUN), 6-0
85 kg – Viktor Lőrincz (HUN) def. Alkhazur Ozdiyev (KAZ)by TF, 9-0
98 kg – Balázs Kiss (HUN) def. Ilya Nastochenko (KAZ), 4-2
130 kg – Bálint Lám (HUN) def. Yessenkeidi Zhalgasbayev (KAZ), 3-0

Round IV

Russia 8 - United States 0
59 kg – Mingiyan Semenov (RUS) def. Ryan Mango (USA), by TF, 8-0
66 kg – Artem Surkov (RUS) def. Ravaughn Perkins (USA), by TF, 8-0
71 kg – Abuyazid Mantsigov (RUS) def. Patrick Smith (USA), by TF, 8-0
75 kg – Evgeny Saleev (RUS) def. Andrew Bisek (USA), 3-0
80 kg – Evgeni Bogomolov (RUS) def. Geordan Speiller (USA), by TF, 8-0
85 kg – Davit Chakvetadze (RUS) def. Jordan Holm (USA) by TF, 8-0
98 kg – Rustam Totrov (RUS) def. Darren Burns (USA), by TF, 10-1
130 kg – Vitaly Ilnitsky (RUS) def. Robby Smith (USA), 5-3

Kazakhstan 5 - Turkey 3
59 kg – Daulet Absalimov (KAZ) def. Şerif Kılıç (TUR)by TF, 9-1
66 kg – Askhat Zhabirov (KAZ) def. Enes Başar (TUR), 3-1
71 kg – Demeu Zhadrayev (KAZ) def. Yunus Özel (TUR), 6-2
75 kg – Furkan Bayrak (TUR) def. Askhat Dilmukhamedov (KAZ), 3-3
80 kg – Selçuk Çebi (TUR) def. Danyal Gajiyev (KAZ), 2-0
85 kg – Alkhazur Ozdiyev (KAZ) def. Metehan Başar (TUR)by TF, 9-1
98 kg – Ilya Nastochenko (KAZ) def. Süleyman Demirci (TUR), 6-2
130 kg – Atilla Güzel (TUR) def. Yessenkeidi Zhalgasbayev (KAZ)by TF, 8-0

Round V

Hungary 7 - Turkey 1
59 kg – Csongor Knipli (HUN) def. Şerif Kılıç (TUR), 7-5
66 kg – Krisztián Jäger (HUN) def. Enes Başar (TUR), 3-0
71 kg – Bálint Korpási (HUN) def. Yunus Özel (TUR), 3-0
75 kg – László Szabó (HUN) def. Furkan Bayrak (TUR), by TF, 9-0
80 kg – Selçuk Çebi (TUR) def. Gábor Madaras (HUN), by TF, 8-0
85 kg – Viktor Lőrincz (HUN) def. İldem Kansu (TUR), 2-1
98 kg – Balázs Kiss (HUN) def. Süleyman Demirci (TUR), by TF, 9-1
130 kg – Bálint Lám (HUN) def. Atilla Güzel (TUR), 2-0

Kazakhstan 5 - United States 3
59 kg – Daulet Absalimov (KAZ) def. Ryan Magno (USA), 13-7
66 kg – Askhat Zhabirov (KAZ) def. Ravaughn Perkins (USA), 1-0
71 kg – Demeu Zhadrayev (KAZ) def. Patrick Smith (USA), by TF, 16-7
75 kg – Andrew Bisek (USA) Won via forfeit
80 kg – Danyal Gajiyev (KAZ) def. Geordan SPeiller (USA) by TF, 8-0
85 kg – Jordan Holm (USA) def. Alkhazur Ozdiyev (KAZ)by TF, 8-0
98 kg – Ilya Nastochenko (KAZ) def. Darren Burns (USA) by TF, 9-0
130 kg – Robbie Smith (USA) def. Yessenkeidi Zhalgasbayev (KAZ)by TF, 8-0

=== Pool B ===
| Team | Pld | W | L | TF | PF | PA |
|---|---|---|---|---|---|---|
| Iran | 4 | 4 | 0 | | | |
| Azerbaijan | 4 | 3 | 1 | | | |
| South Korea | 4 | 1 | 3 | | | |
| Finland | 4 | 1 | 3 | | | |
| Armenia | 4 | 1 | 3 | | | |

POOL B
Round I

Armenia 5 - South Korea 3
59 kg – Choi Gi-uk (KOR) def. Narek Khachatryan (ARM)by TF, 9-0
66 kg – Ryu Han-su (KOR) def. Gevorg Sahakyan (ARM)by TF, 10-0
71 kg – Rafayel Aleksanyan (ARM) def. Jung Ji-Hyun (KOR)by TF, 12-3
75 kg – Kim Hyeon-Woo (KOR) def. Karapet Chalyan (ARM)by TF, 8-0
80 kg – Rafik Manukyan (ARM) def. Kim June- Hyoung (KOR), 2-1
85 kg – Hrach Hovannisyan (ARM) via forfeit
98 kg – Movses Adamyan (ARM) def. Gu Hak-Bon (KOR), 6-4
130 kg – Vachik Yeghiazarya (ARM) def. Kim Yong-Min (KOR)by TF, 8-0

Iran 8 - Azerbaijan 0
59 kg – Hamid Sourian (IRI) def. Taleh Mammadov (AZE), 1-1
66 kg – Omid Noroozi (IRI) def. Azad Aliyev (AZE), 7-6
71 kg – Saeed Abdevali (IRI) def. Rustam Aliyev (AZE)by TF, 9-0
75 kg – Farshad Alizadeh (IRI) def. Elvin Mursaliyev (AZE), 7-1
80 kg – Habibollah Akhlaghi (IRI) def. Emin Ahmadov (AZE), 5-0
85 kg – Taleb Nematpour (IRI) def. Shahriyar Mammadov (AZE), 3-1
98 kg – Mehdi Aliyari (IRI) def. Araz Hasanov (AZE), 2-0
130 kg – Bashir Babajanzadeh (IRI) def. Valera Rodriguez (AZE), 2-0

Round II

Azerbaijan 8 - Armenia 0
59 kg – Orkhan Ahmadov (AZE) def. Narek Khachatryan (ARM)by TF, 8-0
66 kg – Hasan Aliyev (AZE) def. Gevorg Sahakyan (ARM)by TF, 8-0
71 kg – Rasul Chunayev (AZE) def. Rafayel ALEKSANYAN (ARM)by TF, 8-0
75 kg – Elvin Mursaliyev (AZE) def. Karapet Chalyan (ARM), 1-1
80 kg – Emin Ahmadov (AZE) def. Rafik Manukyan (ARM), 8-2
85 kg – Shahriyar Mammadov (AZE) def. Hrach Hovannisyan (ARM), by DQ
98 kg – Saman Tahmasebi (AZE) def. Movses Adamyan (ARM), 6-3
130 kg – Sabah Shariati (AZE) def. Vachik Yeghiazarya (ARM), 4-1

South Korea 4 - Finland 4
59 kg – Choi Gi-uk (KOR) def. Jani Haapamaki (FIN), 3-0
66 kg – Ryu Han-su (KOR) def. Tero Valimaki (FIN) by DQ
71 kg – Henri Palomaki (FIN) def. Jung Ji-Hyun (KOR) by FALL
75 kg – Kim Hyeon-Woo (KOR) via forfeit
80 kg – Aleksandr Kazakevic (FIN) def. Kim June- Hyoung (KOR), 5-3
85 kg – Rami Hietaniemi (FIN) via forfeit
98 kg – Gu Hak-Bon (KOR) def. Timo Kallio (FIN) by FALL
130 kg – Mindaugas Mizgaitis (FIN) def. Kim Yong-Min (KOR), 6-0

Round III

Iran 7 - South Korea 1
59 kg – Mohammad Nourbakhsh (IRI) def. Choi Gi-uk (KOR)by TF, 10-1
66 kg – Afshin Biabangard (IRI) def. Ryu Han-su (KOR), 5-1
71 kg – Saeed Abdevali (IRI) def. JUNG Ji-Hyun (KOR), 4-0
75 kg – Kim Hyeon-Woo (KOR) def. Hadi Alizadeh (IRI)by TF, 9-1
80 kg – Habibollah Akhlaghi (IRI) def. Kim June- Hyoung (KOR), 4-0
85 kg – Taleb Nematpour (IRI) via forfeit
98 kg – Davoud Abedinzadeh (IRI) def. Gu Hak-Bon (KOR)by TF, 9-0
130 kg – Bashir Babajanzadeh (IRI) def. Kim Yong-Min (KOR), 8-2

Finland 5 - Armenia 3
59 kg – Jussi-Pekka Niemisto (FIN) def. Narek Khachatryan (ARM), 3-0
66 kg – Gevorg Sahakyan (ARM) def. Tero Valimaki (FIN), 4-0
71 kg – Rafayel Aleksanyan (ARM) def. Henri Palomaki (FIN), 9-4
75 kg – Karapet Chalyan (ARM) via forfeit
80 kg – Aleksandr Kazakevic (FIN) def. Rafik Manukyan (ARM), 4-0
85 kg – Rami Hietaniemi (FIN) def. Hrach Hovannisyan (ARM), 8-6
98 kg – Timo Kallio (FIN) def. Movses Adamyan (ARM), 1-1
130 kg – Mindaugas Mizgaitis (FIN) def. Vachik Yeghiazarya (ARM), 3-1

Round IV

Azerbaijan 5 - South Korea 3
59 kg – Taleh Mammadov (AZE) def. Choi Gi-uk (KOR), 5-0
66 kg – Hasan Aliyev (AZE) def. Ryu Han-su (KOR), 2-0
71 kg – Rasul Chunayev (AZE) def. Jung Ji-Hyun (KOR) by FALL
75 kg – Kim Hyeon-Woo (KOR) def. Elvin Mursaliyev (AZE), 10-3
80 kg – Kim June- Hyoung (KOR) def. Emin Ahmadov (AZE), 2-0
85 kg – Shahriyar Mammadov (AZE) via forfeit
98 kg – Gu Hak-Bon (KOR) def. Saman Tahmasebi (AZE), 2-2
130 kg – Sabah Shariati (AZE) def. Kim Yong-Min (KOR), 4-0

Iran 8 - Finland 0
59 kg – Hamid Sourian (IRI) def. Jussi-Pekka Niemisto (FIN)by TF, 8-0
66 kg – Omid Noroozi (IRI) def. Tero Valimaki (FIN)by TF, 8-0
71 kg – Broomand Aslan (IRI) def. Henri Palomaki (FIN), 6-2
75 kg – Farshad Alizadeh (IRI) via forfeit
80 kg – Habibollah Akhlaghi (IRI) def. Antti Hakala (FIN), 6-0
85 kg – Davood Akhbari (IRI) def. Shahriyar Mammadov (FIN), 7-0
98 kg – Mehdi Aliyari (IRI) def. Timo Kallio (FIN), 3-1
130 kg – Behnam Mehdizadeh (IRI) def. Mindaugas Mizgaitis (FIN), 6-0

Round V

Azerbaijan 6 - Finland 2

Iran 5 - Armenia 3
59 kg – Hamid Sourian (IRI) def. Narek Khachatryan (ARM)by TF, 9-0
66 kg – Gevorg Sahakyan (ARM) def. Afshin Biabangard (IRI), 4-2
71 kg – Rafayel ALEKSANYAN (ARM) def. Broomand Aslan (IRI), 6-5
75 kg – Karapet Chalyan (ARM) def. Hadi Alizadeh (IRI), 4-1
80 kg – Mehdi Mohammadi (IRI) def. Rafik Manukyan (ARM)by TF, 9-0
85 kg – Davood Akhbari (IRI) def. Hrach Hovannisyan (ARM) by FALL
98 kg – Davoud Abedinzadeh (IRI) def. Movses Adamyan (ARM), 6-0
130 kg – Behnam Mehdizadeh (IRI) def. Vachik Yeghiazarya (ARM), 7-1

== Rank stage ==
First-Place Match

Iran 6 - Russia 2
59 kg – Hamid Sourian (IRI) def. Mingiyan Semenov (RUS), 6-5
66 kg – Adam Kurak (RUS) def. Omid Noroozi (IRI), 8-6
71 kg – Saeed Abdevali (IRI) def. Chingiz Labazanov (RUS), 3-0
75 kg – Roman Vlasov (RUS) def. Farshad Alizadeh (IRI)by TF, 11-0
80 kg – Habibollah Akhlaghi (IRI) def. Evgeni Bogomolov (RUS)by TF, 8-0
85 kg – Taleb Nematpour (IRI) def. Davit Chakvetadze (RUS), 3-1
98 kg – Mehdi Aliyari (IRI) def. Nikita Melnikov (RUS), 3-1
130 kg – Bashir Babajanzadeh (IRI) def. Vasily Parshin (RUS)by TF, 9-0

Third-Place Match

Azerbaijan 6 - Hungary 2
59 kg – Taleh Mammadov (AZE) def. Csongor Knipli (HUN)by TF, 11-0
66 kg – Hasan Aliyev (AZE) def. Krisztián Jager (HUN)by DQ
71 kg – Rasul Chunayev (AZE) def. Bálint Korpási (HUN), 4-2
75 kg – Elvin Mursaliyev (AZE) def. László Szabó (HUN), 3-0
80 kg – Emin Ahmadov (AZE) def. Gábor Madaras (HUN) by FALL
85 kg – Viktor Lőrincz (HUN) def. Shahriyar Mammadov (AZE), 1-0
98 kg – Balázs Kiss (HUN) def. Araz Hasanov (AZE), 4-0
130 kg – Sabah Shariati (AZE) def. Bálint Láml (HUN), 1-0

Fifth-Place Match

Turkey 4 - South Korea 4
59 kg – Choi Gi-uk (KOR) def. Şerif Kılıç (TUR), 12-10
66 kg – Ryu Han-su (KOR) def. Enes Başar (TUR), 5-0
71 kg – Jung Ji-Hyun (KOR) def. Yunus Özel (TUR), 5-5
75 kg – Kim Hyeon-Woo (KOR) def. Furkan Bayrak (TUR)by TF, 9-0
80 kg – Doğan Göktaş (TUR) def. Kim June- Hyoung (KOR)by TF, 9-0
85 kg – Metehan Başar (TUR) via forfeit
98 kg – Süleyman Demirci (TUR) def. Timo Kallio (KOR)by TF, 9-0
130 kg – Atilla Güzel (TUR) def. Kim Yong-Min (KOR), 3-1

Seventh-Place Match

Kazakhstan 4 - Finland 4
59 kg – Jussi-Pekka Niemisto (FIN) def. Daulet Absalimov (KAZ), 5-0
66 kg – Askhat Zhabirov (KAZ) def. Tero Valimaki (FIN), 4-3
71 kg – Demeu Zhadrayev (KAZ) def. Henri Palomaki (FIN)by TF, 9-0
75 kg – Askhat Dilmukhamedov (KAZ) via forfeit
80 kg – Aleksandr Kazakevic (FIN) def. Danyal Gajiyev (KAZ), 6-0
85 kg – Alkhazur Ozdiyev (KAZ) def. Rami Hietaniemi (FIN)by TF, 10-0
98 kg – Timo Kallio (FIN) def. Ilya Nastochenko (KAZ)by TF, 10-0
130 kg – Mindaugas Mizgaitis (FIN) def. Yessenkeidi Zhalgasbayev (KAZ)by TF, 9-1

Ninth-Place Match

United States 4 df. Armenia 4
59 kg – Narek Khachatryan (ARM) def. Ryan Magno (USA), 9-6
66 kg – Ravaughn Perkins (USA) def. Gevorg Sahakyan (ARM) by FALL
71 kg – Rafayel Aleksanyan (ARM) def. Patrick Smith (USA), by TF, 10-2
75 kg – Andrew Bisek (USA) def. Karapet Chalyan (ARM), 1-0
80 kg – Rafik Manukyan (ARM) def. Geordan Speiller (USA) by TF, 10-0
85 kg – Jordan Holm (USA) def. Hrach Hovannisyan (ARM), 5-0
98 kg – Movses Adamyan (ARM) def. Darren Burns (USA) by TF, 12-4
130 kg – Robbie Smith (USA) def. Vachik Yeghiazarya (ARM) by FALL

== Final classement ==
| Team | Pld | W | D | L |
|---|---|---|---|---|
| Iran | 5 | 5 | 0 | 0 |
| Russia | 5 | 4 | 0 | 1 |
| Azerbaijan | 5 | 4 | 0 | 1 |
| Hungary | 5 | 2 | 1 | 2 |
| Turkey | 5 | 1 | 1 | 3 |
| South Korea | 5 | 0 | 2 | 3 |
| Kazakhstan | 5 | 2 | 2 | 1 |
| Finland | 5 | 1 | 2 | 2 |
| United States | 5 | 0 | 1 | 4 |
| Armenia | 5 | 1 | 1 | 3 |
