= 2015 Wrestling World Cup – Men's Greco-Roman =

Men's Greco-Roman at the 2015 Wrestling World Cup
- Venue: Azadi Indoor Stadium
- Location: Tehran, Iran
- Dates: 19–20 February

Medalists
| gold medal | Azerbaijan |
| silver medal | Russia |
| bronze medal | Iran |

The 2015 Wrestling World Cup – Men's Greco-Roman was the first of a set of three FILA Wrestling World Cups in 2015. The event took place in Tehran, Iran at Azadi Indoor Stadium February 19 and 20, 2015.

== Pool stage ==
| Team competes for 1st place |
| Team competes for 3rd place |
| Team competes for 5th place |
| Team competes for 7th place |

=== Pool A ===
| Team | Pld | W | L |
|---|---|---|---|
| Azerbaijan | 3 | 3 | 0 |
| Iran | 3 | 2 | 1 |
| Sweden | 3 | 1 | 2 |
| Germany | 3 | 0 | 3 |

POOL A
Round I

Azerbaijan 6 - Iran 2
| Weight | Azerbaijan | result | Iran |
|---|---|---|---|
| 59 kg | Rovshan Bayramov | 3 – 4 | Mohsen Hajipour |
| 66 kg | Hasan Aliyev | 5 – 0 | Afshin Biabangard |
| 71 kg | Rasul Chunayev | 4 – 4 | Ramin Taheri |
| 75 kg | Elvin Mursaliyev | 2 – 0 | Yousof Akhbari |
| 80 kg | Rafig Huseynov | 5 – 4 | Habibollah Akhlaghi |
| 85 kg | Islam Abbasov | 10 – 4 | Mojtaba Karimfar |
| 98 kg | Orkhan NurIyev | 0 – 1 | Mehdi Aliyari |
| 130 kg | Sabah Shariati | 8 – 0 | Behnam Mehdizadeh |

Sweden 6 - Germany 2
| Weight | Sweden | result | Germany |
|---|---|---|---|
| 59 kg | Joakim Fagerlund | – | Deniz Menekse |
| 66 kg | Frunze Harutyunyan | 1 – 3 | Matthias Maasch |
| 71 kg | Zakarias Tallroth | 8 – 0 | Maximilian Schwabe |
| 75 kg | Robert Rosengren | 1 – 1 | Jan Rotter |
| 80 kg | Lennie Persson | 4^{F} – 2 | Florian Neumaier |
| 85 kg | Jim Pettersson | 2 – 1 | Jan Fischer |
| 98 kg | Fredrik Schön | 2 – 0 | Felix Radinger |
| 130 kg | Johan Eurén | 10 – 0 | Eduard Popp |

Round II

Iran 6 - Sweden 2
| Weight | Iran | result | Sweden |
|---|---|---|---|
| 59 kg | Mohammad Noorbakhsh | – | Joakim Fagerlund |
| 66 kg | Afshin Biabangard | 3 – 0 | Frunze Harutyunyan |
| 71 kg | Payam Bouyeri | 8 – 0 | Sharur Vardanyan |
| 75 kg | Yousof Akhbari | 4 – 1 | Christoffer Nilsson |
| 80 kg | Ali Zinatirafah | 0 – 3 | Lennie Persson |
| 85 kg | Davoud Abedinzadeh | 1 – 0 | Kristofer Johansson |
| 98 kg | Mehdi Aliyari | 7 – 3 | Theodoros Tounousidis |
| 130 kg | Bashir Babajanzadeh | 0 – 1 | Johan Eurén |

Azerbaijan 7 - Germany 1
| Weight | Azerbaijan | result | Germany |
|---|---|---|---|
| 59 kg | Elman Mukhtarov | 9 – 3 | Deniz Menekse |
| 66 kg | Hasan Aliyev | 1 – 0 | Matthias Maasch |
| 71 kg | Rustam Aliyev | 8 – 0 | Maximilian Schwabe |
| 75 kg | Elvin Mursaliyev | 5 – 1 | Jan Rotter |
| 80 kg | Rafig Huseynov | 3 – 0 | Pascal Eisele |
| 85 kg | Shahriyar Mammadov | 2 – 0 | Jan Fischer |
| 98 kg | Orkhan NurIyev | 2 – 3 | Felix Radinger |
| 130 kg | Sabah Shariati | 1 – 0 | Eduard Popp |

Round III

Iran 7 - Germany 1
| Weight | Iran | result | Germany |
|---|---|---|---|
| 59 kg | Mohammad Noorbakhsh | 3 – 0 | Deniz Menekse |
| 66 kg | Mohammad Ali Geraei | 3 – 4 | Matthias Maasch |
| 71 kg | Ramin Taheri | 4 – 0 | Maximilian Schwabe |
| 75 kg | Yousof Akhbari | 2 – 0 | Jan Rotter |
| 80 kg | Habibollah Akhlaghi | 3 – 0 | Florian Neumaier |
| 85 kg | Davoud Abedinzadeh | 6 – 0 | Jan Fischer |
| 98 kg | Mehdi Aliyari | 5 – 0 | Felix Radinger |
| 130 kg | Behnam Mehdizadeh | 2 – 0 | Eduard Popp |

Azerbaijan 7 - Sweden 1
| Weight | Azerbaijan | result | Sweden |
|---|---|---|---|
| 59 kg | Elman Mukhtarov | – | Joakim Fagerlund |
| 66 kg | Kamran Mammadov | 6 – 2 | Frunze Harutyunyan |
| 71 kg | Rasul Chunayev | 4^{F} – 0 | Sharur Vardanyan |
| 75 kg | Elvin Mursaliyev | 8 – 0 | Christoffer Nilsson |
| 80 kg | Rafig Huseynov | 8 – 0 | Lennie Persson |
| 85 kg | Islam Abbasov | 2 – 0 | Jim Pettersson |
| 98 kg | Orkhan NurIyev | 2 – 1 | Theodoros Tounousidis |
| 130 kg | Sabah Shariati | 0 – 2 | Johan Eurén |

=== Pool B ===
| Team | Pld | W | L |
|---|---|---|---|
| Russia | 3 | 3 | 0 |
| Turkey | 3 | 2 | 1 |
| Hungary | 3 | 1 | 2 |
| Armenia | 3 | 0 | 3 |

POOL B
Round I

Russia 5 - Hungary 3
| Weight | Russia | result | Hungary |
|---|---|---|---|
| 59 kg | Stepan Maryanyan | 6 – 1 | Péter Módos |
| 66 kg | Artem Surkov | 2 – 0 | Krisztian Jager |
| 71 kg | Yury Denisov | 3 – 4 | Tamás Lőrincz |
| 75 kg | Roman Vlasov | 11 – 0 | Laszlo Szabo |
| 80 kg | Evgeny Saleev | 7 – 6 | Péter Bácsi |
| 85 kg | Azamat Bikbaev | 2 – 2 | Patrik Szabo |
| 98 kg | Maksim Safarian | 2 – 1 | Balázs Kiss |
| 130 kg | Vitalii Shchur | 0 – 1 | Bálint Lám |

Turkey 6 - Armenia 2
| Weight | Turkey | result | Armenia |
|---|---|---|---|
| 59 kg | Rüstem Hammet | 6 – 4 | Artur Mkrtchyan |
| 66 kg | Atakan Yüksel | 2 – 1 | Gor Sirekanyan |
| 71 kg | Yunus Özel | 10^{F} – 6 | Rafayel Aleksanyan |
| 75 kg | Emrah Kuş | 0 – 3 | Karapet Chalyan |
| 80 kg | Aslan Atem | 4 – 3 | Eduard Sargsyan |
| 85 kg | Kansu İldem | 3 – 4 | Masim Manukyan |
| 98 kg | Fatih Başköy | 8 – 0 | Vahe Simonyan |
| 130 kg | Rıza Kayaalp | 8 – 0 | Edgar Khachatryan |

Round II

Russia 7 - Armenia 1
| Weight | Russia | result | Armenia |
|---|---|---|---|
| 59 kg | Zaur Kabaloev | 3 – 2 | Artur Mkrtchyan |
| 66 kg | Asker Orshokdugov | 8 – 0 | Gor Sirekanyan |
| 71 kg | Chingiz Labazanov | 9 – 2 | Rafayel Aleksanyan |
| 75 kg | Alexandr Chekhirkin | 1 – 1 | Karapet Chalyan |
| 80 kg | Bilan Nalgiev | 10 – 2 | Eduard Sargsyan |
| 85 kg | Davit Chakvetadze | 3^{'F} – 2 | Masim Manukyan |
| 98 kg | Nikita Melnikov | 2^{F} – 0 | Sergey Starodub |
| 130 kg | 'Sergey Semenov | 10 – 2 | Edgar Khachatryan |

Turkey 4.df - Hungary 4
| Weight | Turkey | result | Hungary |
|---|---|---|---|
| 59 kg | Ayhan Karakuş | 8 – 0 | Péter Módos |
| 66 kg | Atakan Yüksel | 5 – 4^{F} | Krisztian Jager |
| 71 kg | Yunus Özel | 0 – 5 | Balint Korpasi |
| 75 kg | Emrah Kuş | 0 – 4 | Laszlo Szabo |
| 80 kg | Aslan Atem | 0 – 2 | Péter Bácsi |
| 85 kg | Metehan Başar | 3 – 0 | Patrik Szabo |
| 98 kg | Fatih Başköy | 2 – 1 | Balázs Kiss |
| 130 kg | Rıza Kayaalp | 5 – 0 | Bálint Lám |

Round III

Russia 6 - Turkey 2
| Weight | Russia | result | Turkey |
|---|---|---|---|
| 59 kg | Stepan Maryanyan | 1 – 11 | Ayhan Karakuş |
| 66 kg | Artem Surkov | 3 – 0 | Atakan Yüksel |
| 71 kg | Yury Denisov | 5 – 0 | Yunus Özel |
| 75 kg | Roman Vlasov | 3 – 0 | Emrah Kuş |
| 80 kg | Evgeny Saleev | 4 – 1 | Aslan Atem |
| 85 kg | Davit Chakvetadze | 5 – 1 | Metehan Başar |
| 98 kg | Maksim Safarian | 3 – 0 | Fatih Başköy |
| 130 kg | Sergey Semenov | 4 – 7 | Rıza Kayaalp |

Hungary 5 - Armenia 3
| Weight | Hungary | result | Armenia |
|---|---|---|---|
| 59 kg | Péter Módos | 4 – 4 | Artur Mkrtchyan |
| 66 kg | Krisztian Jager | 8 – 0 | Gor Sirekanyan |
| 71 kg | Balint Korpasi | 2 – 0 | Rafayel Aleksanyan |
| 75 kg | Laszlo Szabo | 0 – 1 | Karapet Chalyan |
| 80 kg | Péter Bácsi | 9 – 4 | Eduard Sargsyan |
| 85 kg | Patrik Szabo | 0 – 8 | Masim Manukyan |
| 98 kg | 'Balázs Kiss | 3 – 0 | Vahe Simonyan |
| 130 kg | Bálint Lám | 10 – 4 | Edgar Khachatryan |

== Medal Matches ==
Medal Matches
First-Place Match

Azerbaijan 4.df - Russia 4
| Weight | Azerbaijan | result | Russia |
|---|---|---|---|
| 59 kg | Elman Mukhtarov | 2 – 3 | Zaur Kabaloev |
| 66 kg | Hasan Aliyev | 5 – 1 | Artem Surkov |
| 71 kg | Rasul Chunayev | 2 – 0 | Chingiz Labazanov |
| 75 kg | Elvin Mursaliyev | 0 – 8 | Roman Vlasov |
| 80 kg | Rafig Huseynov | 2 – 1 | Evgeny Saleev |
| 85 kg | Islam Abbasov | 4^{F} – 4 | Davit Chakvetadze |
| 98 kg | Orkhan NurIyev | 0 – 5 | Nikita Melnikov |
| 130 kg | Sabah Shariati | 1 – 2 | Sergey Semenov |

Third-Place Match

Iran 6 - Turkey 2
| Weight | Iran | result | Turkey |
|---|---|---|---|
| 59 kg | Mohsen Hajipour | 6^{F} – 0 | Ayhan Karakuş |
| 66 kg | Afshin Biabangard | – | by forfeit |
| 71 kg | Payam Bouyeri | 6 – 0 | Yunus Özel |
| 75 kg | Yousof Akhbari | 2 – 7 | Emrah Kuş |
| 80 kg | Habibollah Akhlaghi | 10 – 2 | Aslan Atem |
| 85 kg | Davoud Abedinzadeh | 2 – 0 | Metehan Başar |
| 98 kg | Mehdi Aliyari | 1 – 1 | Fatih Başköy |
| 130 kg | Behnam Mehdizadeh | 2 – 10 | Rıza Kayaalp |

Fifth-Place Match

Hungary 6 - Sweden 2
| Weight | Hungary | result | Sweden |
|---|---|---|---|
| 59 kg | Péter Módos | – | Joakim Fagerlund |
| 66 kg | Krisztian Jager | 5 – 0 | Frunze Harutyunyan |
| 71 kg | Tamás Lőrincz | 3 – 1 | Zakarias Tallroth |
| 75 kg | Laszlo Szabo | 3 – 0 | Robert Rosengren |
| 80 kg | Péter Bácsi | 8 – 0 | Lennie Persson |
| 85 kg | Patrik Szabo | 1 – 4 | Kristofer Johansson |
| 98 kg | Balázs Kiss | 2 – 1 | Fredrik Schön |
| 130 kg | Bálint Lám | 0 – 5 | Johan Eurén |

Seventh-Place Match

Germany 6 - Armenia 2
| Weight | Germany | result | Armenia |
|---|---|---|---|
| 59 kg | Deniz Menekse | 9 – 8 | Artur Mkrtchyan |
| 66 kg | Matthias Maasch | 5 – 2 | Gor Sirekanyan |
| 71 kg | Maximilian Schwabe | 5 – 4 | Rafayel Aleksanyan |
| 75 kg | Jan Rotter | 0 – 8 | Karapet Chalyan |
| 80 kg | Florian Neumaier | 6 – 3 | Eduard Sargsyan |
| 85 kg | Jan Fischer | 0 – 8 | Masim Manukyan |
| 98 kg | Felix Radinger | 2 – 1 | Vahe Simonyan |
| 130 kg | Eduard Popp | 16 – 2 | Edgar Khachatryan |

== Final classement ==
| Team | Pld | W | L |
|---|---|---|---|
| Azerbaijan | 4 | 4 | 0 |
| Russia | 4 | 3 | 1 |
| Iran | 4 | 3 | 1 |
| Turkey | 4 | 2 | 2 |
| Hungary | 4 | 2 | 2 |
| Sweden | 4 | 1 | 3 |
| Germany | 4 | 1 | 3 |
| Armenia | 4 | 0 | 4 |

== See also ==
- 2015 Wrestling World Cup - Men's freestyle
