= 2015 Russian National Greco-Roman Wrestling Championships =

Russian Wrestling competition

2015 Russian Greco-Roman Nationals
- Host city: (Leningrad Oblast) Saint Petersburg, Russia
- Dates: March 10–11
- Stadium: Sibur Arena

Champions
- Greco-Roman: (Leningrad Oblast) Saint Petersburg

The Russian National Greco-Roman Wrestling Championships 2015 also known as the Russian Greco-Roman Nationals 2015 was held in Saint Petersburg, Leningrad Oblast, Russia, from 10–11 March 2015.

== Medal overview ==
=== Medal table ===
Rank	Team	Gold	Silver	Bronze	Total
1	Leningrad Oblast	3	0	1	4
2	Dagestan	2	0	0	2
3	Mordovia	1	3	1	5
4	Moscow Oblast	1	1	4	6
5	Krasnoyarsk Krai	1	0	1	2
6	Rostov Oblast	0	2	1	3
7	Khanty-Mansi Autonomous Okrug	0	1	0	1
7	Vladimir Oblast	0	1	0	1
9	Bashkortostan	0	0	1	1
9	Kemerovo Oblast	0	0	1	1
9	Novosibirsk Oblast	0	0	1	1
9	Tatarstan	0	0	1	1
9	Tver Oblast	0	0	1	1
9	Tyumen Oblast	0	0	1	1
9	Yamalo-Nenets Autonomous Okrug	0	0	1	1
Totals (15 entries)		8	8	15	31

=== Men's Greco-Roman ===
Event	Gold	Silver	Bronze
59 kg	(Leningrad Oblast) Ibragim Labazanov	(Moscow Oblast) Stepan Maryanyan	(Krasnoyarsk Krai) Mingiyan Semenov
59 kg	(Leningrad Oblast) Ibragim Labazanov	(Moscow Oblast) Stepan Maryanyan	(Mordovia) Zhambolat Lokyaev
66 kg	(Krasnoyarsk Krai) Adam Kurak	(Vladimir Oblast) Abuyazid Mantsigov	(Yamalo-Nenets Autonomous Okrug) Azamat Akhmedov
66 kg	(Krasnoyarsk Krai) Adam Kurak	(Vladimir Oblast) Abuyazid Mantsigov	(Moscow Oblast) Aslan Abdullin
71 kg	(Leningrad Oblast) Yury Denisov	(Mordovia) Denis Murtazin	(Novosibirsk Oblast) Valery Gusarov
71 kg	(Leningrad Oblast) Yury Denisov	(Mordovia) Denis Murtazin	(Rostov Oblast) Irakli Kalandiya
75 kg	(Leningrad Oblast) Chingiz Labazanov	(Rostov Oblast) Aleksandr Chekhirkin	(Moscow Oblast) Ilyas Magamadov
75 kg	(Leningrad Oblast) Chingiz Labazanov	(Rostov Oblast) Aleksandr Chekhirkin	(Moscow Oblast) Bilan Nalgiev
80 kg	(Mordovia) Evgeny Saleev	(Rostov Oblast) Ramazan Abacharaev	(Moscow Oblast) Roman Yusupov
80 kg	(Mordovia) Evgeny Saleev	(Rostov Oblast) Ramazan Abacharaev	(Tatarstan) Imil Sharafetdinov
85 kg	(Moscow Oblast) Davit Chakvetadze	(Mordovia) Aleksey Mishin	(Bashkortostan) Azamat Bikbaev
85 kg	(Moscow Oblast) Davit Chakvetadze	(Mordovia) Aleksey Mishin	(Tver Oblast) Bekkhan Ozdoev
98 kg	(Dagestan) Islam Magomedov	(Khanty-Mansi Autonomous Okrug) Konstantin Efimov	(Leningrad Oblast) Maksim Safarian
98 kg	(Dagestan) Islam Magomedov	(Khanty-Mansi Autonomous Okrug) Konstantin Efimov	(Tyumen Oblast) Rustam Totrov
130 kg	(Dagestan) Bilyal Makhov	(Mordovia) Vasily Parshin	(Kemerovo Oblast) Vitalii Shchur
130 kg	(Dagestan) Bilyal Makhov	(Mordovia) Vasily Parshin	(Moscow Oblast) Kurban Nazhmudinov

== See also ==
- 2015 Russian National Freestyle Wrestling Championships
