= Wrestling at the 2015 European Games – Men's Greco-Roman 71 kg =

Men's Greco-Roman 71 kg at the 2015 European Games
- Venue: Heydar Aliyev Arena
- Date: 13 June
- Competitors: 24 from 24 nations

Medalists
gold medal	Rasul Chunayev	Azerbaijan
silver medal	Bálint Korpási	Hungary
bronze medal	Dominik Etlinger	Croatia
bronze medal	Frank Stäbler	Germany

Men's Greco-Roman 71 kg competition at the 2015 European Games in Baku, Azerbaijan, took place on 13 June at the Heydar Aliyev Arena.

== Schedule ==
All times are Azerbaijan Summer Time (UTC+05:00)

Date	Time	Event
Saturday, 13 June 2015	10:00	Qualifications
Saturday, 13 June 2015	11:00	1/8 finals
Saturday, 13 June 2015	13:00	Quarterfinals
Saturday, 13 June 2015	13:00	Semifinals
Saturday, 13 June 2015	15:00	Repechage
Saturday, 13 June 2015	19:00	Finals

== Results ==
Legend

- F — Won by fall
- WO — Won by walkover

=== Final ===
Final
(Azerbaijan) Rasul Chunayev (AZE)	4
(Hungary) Bálint Korpási (HUN)	2

=== Top half ===
Qualifications

1/8 finals
(Azerbaijan) Rasul Chunayev (AZE)	7
(Moldova) Daniel Cataraga (MDA)	6
(Portugal) Zurab Bekauri (POR)
(Croatia) Dominik Etlinger (CRO)	WO
(Bulgaria) Svilen Kostadinov (BUL)	9
(Czech Republic) Tomáš Sobecký (CZE)	0
(Ukraine) Mykola Savchenko (UKR)	8
(Poland) Daniel Rutkowski (POL)	0

Quarterfinals
(Azerbaijan) Rasul Chunayev (AZE)	4
(Croatia) Dominik Etlinger (CRO)	0
(Bulgaria) Svilen Kostadinov (BUL)	2
(Ukraine) Mykola Savchenko (UKR)	1

Semifinals
(Azerbaijan) Rasul Chunayev (AZE)	10
(Bulgaria) Svilen Kostadinov (BUL)	0

=== Bottom half ===
Qualifications
(Romania) Tomi Hinoveanu (ROU)	0
(Sweden) Zakarias Tallroth (SWE)	4
(Belarus) Pavel Liakh (BLR)	13
(Turkey) Yunus Özel (TUR)	2
(Slovakia) Vojtech Jakus (SVK)	0
(Germany) Frank Stäbler (GER)	4

1/8 finals
(Serbia) Mate Nemeš (SRB)	1
(Russia) Yury Denisov (RUS)	6
(Georgia (country)) Mindla Tsulukidze (GEO)	7
(Norway) Petter Karlsen (NOR)	3
(Hungary) Bálint Korpási (HUN)	8
(Sweden) Zakarias Tallroth (SWE)	0
(Belarus) Pavel Liakh (BLR)	0
(Germany) Frank Stäbler (GER)	8

Quarterfinals
(Russia) Yury Denisov (RUS)	4
(Georgia (country)) Mindla Tsulukidze (GEO)	4
(Hungary) Bálint Korpási (HUN)	4
(Germany) Frank Stäbler (GER)	3

Semifinals
(Georgia (country)) Mindla Tsulukidze (GEO)	3
(Hungary) Bálint Korpási (HUN)	7

=== Repechage ===
Repechage round 1
(Moldova) Daniel Cataraga (MDA)	2
(Croatia) Dominik Etlinger (CRO)	6
(Sweden) Zakarias Tallroth (SWE)	1
(Germany) Frank Stäbler (GER)	10

Bronze medal match
(Croatia) Dominik Etlinger (CRO)	8
(Bulgaria) Svilen Kostadinov (BUL)	0
(Germany) Frank Stäbler (GER)	6
(Georgia (country)) Mindla Tsulukidze (GEO)	4
