= 2014 European Wrestling Championships – Men's Greco-Roman 71 kg =

Wrestling competitions

The Men's Greco-Roman 71 kg is a competition featured at the 2014 European Wrestling Championships, and was held in Vantaa, Finland on 6 April 2014.

== Medalists ==
Gold	Tamás Lőrincz; Hungary
Silver	Rasul Chunayev; Azerbaijan
Bronze	Yunus Özel; Turkey
Bronze	Aliaksandr Dzemyanovich; Belarus

== Results ==
Legend

- C — Won by 3 cautions given to the opponent
- F — Won by fall
- R — Retired

=== Final ===
Final
Rasul Chunayev (AZE)	0
Tamás Lőrincz (HUN)	2^{F}

=== Top half ===
Round of 32

Round of 16
Tomáš Sobecký (CZE)	5
Georgios Prevolarakis (GRE)	5
Rauno Pajuviidik (EST)	0
Armen Vardanyan (UKR)	4
Rasul Chunayev (AZE)	8
Sergejs Mironovs (LAT)	0
Henri Palomäki (FIN)	0
Yunus Özel (TUR)	3

Quarterfinals
Georgios Prevolarakis (GRE)	0
Armen Vardanyan (UKR)	4
Rasul Chunayev (AZE)	9
Yunus Özel (TUR)	1

Semifinals
Armen Vardanyan (UKR)	0
Rasul Chunayev (AZE)	9^{F}

=== Bottom half ===
Round of 32
Manuchar Tskhadaia (GEO)	1
Chingiz Labazanov (RUS)	3^{C}
Aleksandar Maksimović (SRB)	0
Tamás Lőrincz (HUN)	4
Ionel Puşcaşu (ROU)	12^{F}
Ismael Navarro (ESP)	0
Tudor Gaivan (MDA)	8
Artak Margaryan (FRA)	10
Aleksander Dzemyanovich (BLR)	8
Varsham Boranyan (ARM)	0

Round of 16
Sharur Vardanyan (SWE)	4
Petter Karlsen (NOR)	1
Matthias Maasch (GER)	0
Chingiz Labazanov (RUS)	4
Tamás Lőrincz (HUN)	7^{F}
Ionel Puşcaşu (ROU)	3
Artak Margaryan (FRA)	0
Aleksander Dzemyanovich (BLR)	5^{F}

Quarterfinals
Sharur Vardanyan (SWE)	0
Chingiz Labazanov (RUS)	8
Tamás Lőrincz (HUN)	10
Aleksander Dzemyanovich (BLR)	0

Semifinals
Chingiz Labazanov (RUS)	0
Tamás Lőrincz (HUN)	3

=== Repechage ===
Repechage round 1
Aleksandar Maksimović (SRB)	3^{C}
Ionel Puşcaşu (ROU)	0

Repechage round 2
Sergejs Mironovs (LAT)	0
Yunus Özel (TUR)	8
Aleksandar Maksimović (SRB)	1^{R}
Aleksander Dzemyanovich (BLR)	5

Bronze medals
Yunus Özel (TUR)	8^{C}
Armen Vardanyan (UKR)	0
Aleksander Dzemyanovich (BLR)	4
Chingiz Labazanov (RUS)	2
