= Tiedemann =

Tiedemann is both a surname and a given name of German origin, a variant of Thiedemann. Notable people with the name include:

Surname:

- Carlo von Tiedemann (1943–2025), German television presenter
- Charlotte Tiedemann (1919–1979), German singer and actress
- Dietrich Tiedemann (1748–1803), German psychologist
- Friedrich Tiedemann (1781–1861), German physiologist
- Heinrich von Tiedemann (1840–1922), Prussian politician
- Mark W. Tiedemann (born 1954), American science fiction writer
- Neil Edward Tiedemann (born 1948), Auxiliary Bishop of Brooklyn and Titular Bishop of Cova
- Pyotr Genrikhovich Tiedemann (1872–1941), Russian diplomat
- R. G. Tiedemann (1941–2019), German historian
- Ricky Tiedemann (born 2002), American baseball player

Given name:

- Tiedemann Giese (1480–1550), bishop and friend of Copernicus

== See also ==
- Thijmen, Dutch variant
