= 2014 World Wrestling Championships – Men's Greco-Roman 71 kg =

Men's Greco-Roman 71 kg at the 2014 World Championships
- Venue: Gymnastics Sport Palace
- Dates: 14 September 2014
- Competitors: 30 from 30 nations

Medalists
| gold medal | Chingiz Labazanov | Russia |
| silver medal | Yunus Özel | Turkey |
| bronze medal | Afshin Biabangard | Iran |
| bronze medal | Rasul Chunayev | Azerbaijan |

The men's Greco-Roman 71 kilograms is a competition featured at the 2014 World Wrestling Championships, and was held in Tashkent, Uzbekistan on 14 September 2014.

This Greco-Roman wrestling competition consisted of a single-elimination tournament, with a repechage used to determine the winners of two bronze medals.

== Results ==
Legend

- C — Won by 3 cautions given to the opponent
- F — Won by fall

=== Final ===
| Final |
| Chingiz Labazanov (RUS) | 3 |
| Yunus Özel (TUR) | 1 |

=== Top half ===
Round of 32
Bálint Korpási (HUN) | 2
Armen Vardanyan (UKR) | 0
Chingiz Labazanov (RUS) | 5
Aleksandar Maksimović (SRB) | 2
Aliaksandr Dzemyanovich (BLR) | 8
Tomáš Sobecký (CZE) | 0
Joseph Lopez (GUM) | 0
Kairat Tugolbaev (KGZ) | 9
Franson Gibbons (PLW) | 0
Şermet Permanow (TKM) | 4^{F}
Matthias Maasch (GER) | 2
Zakarias Tallroth (SWE) | 2

Round of 16
Kim Young-ha (KOR) | 0
Afshin Biabangard (IRI) | 2
Bálint Korpási (HUN) | 1
Chingiz Labazanov (RUS) | 2
Aliaksandr Dzemyanovich (BLR) | 10
Kairat Tugolbaev (KGZ) | 2
Şermet Permanow (TKM) | 7^{F}
Zakarias Tallroth (SWE) | 3

Quarterfinals
Afshin Biabangard (IRI) | 0
Chingiz Labazanov (RUS) | 4
Aliaksandr Dzemyanovich (BLR) | 4^{F}
Şermet Permanow (TKM) | 6

Semifinals
Chingiz Labazanov (RUS) | 8
Aliaksandr Dzemyanovich (BLR) | 0

=== Bottom half ===
Round of 32
Riccardo Abbrescia (ITA) | 0
Varsham Boranyan (ARM) | 9
Kristaps Kalnakārklis (LAT) | 0
Dilshod Turdiev (UZB) | 8
Demeu Zhadrayev (KAZ) | 9
Zhang Ridong (CHN) | 0
Krishan Kant Yadav (IND) | 5^{C}
Vojtech Jakus (SVK) | 3
Rasul Chunayev (AZE) | 8
Noritomo Eto (JPN) | 0
Mindia Tsulukidze (GEO) | 0
Justin Lester (USA) | 5
Ionel Puşcaşu (ROU) | 7
Georgios Prevolarakis (GRE) | 0
Yunus Özel (TUR) | 8
Fernando Gómez (MEX) | 0

Round of 16
Varsham Boranyan (ARM) | 10
Dilshod Turdiev (UZB) | 2
Demeu Zhadrayev (KAZ) | 8
Krishan Kant Yadav (IND) | 0
Rasul Chunayev (AZE) | 9
Justin Lester (USA) | 7
Ionel Puşcaşu (ROU) | 1
Yunus Özel (TUR) | 3

Quarterfinals
Varsham Boranyan (ARM) | 2
Demeu Zhadrayev (KAZ) | 1
Rasul Chunayev (AZE) | 1
Yunus Özel (TUR) | 4

Semifinals
Varsham Boranyan (ARM) | 0
Yunus Özel (TUR) | 5^{F}

=== Repechage ===
Repechage round 1
Aleksandar Maksimović (SRB) | 2
Bálint Korpási (HUN) | 7
Fernando Gómez (MEX) | 0
Ionel Puşcaşu (ROU) | 8

Repechage round 2
Bálint Korpási (HUN) | 3
Afshin Biabangard (IRI) | 4
Ionel Puşcaşu (ROU) | 1
Rasul Chunayev (AZE) | 9

Bronze medals
Afshin Biabangard (IRI) | 5
Aliaksandr Dzemyanovich (BLR) | 3
Rasul Chunayev (AZE) | 11
Varsham Boranyan (ARM) | 0
