= 2015 World Wrestling Championships – Men's Greco-Roman 71 kg =

Men's Greco-Roman 71 kg at the 2015 World Championships
- Venue: Orleans Arena
- Dates: 8 September 2015
- Competitors: 31 from 31 nations

Medalists
gold medal	Rasul Chunayev	Azerbaijan
silver medal	Armen Vardanyan	Ukraine
bronze medal	Adam Kurak	Russia
bronze medal	Zakarias Tallroth	Sweden

The men's Greco-Roman 71 kilograms is a competition featured at the 2015 World Wrestling Championships, and was held in Las Vegas, United States on 8 September 2015.

This Greco-Roman wrestling competition consisted of a single-elimination tournament, with a repechage used to determine the winners of two bronze medals.

== Results ==
Legend

- F — Won by fall
- R — Retired

=== Final ===
Final
Rasul Chunayev (AZE)	6
Armen Vardanyan (UKR)	4

=== Top half ===
Round of 32
Vojtech Jakus (SVK)	8
Stefan Steigl (AUT)	0
Lee Jeong-geun (KOR)	1
Varsham Boranyan (ARM)	5
Ibrahim El-Desouky (EGY)	0^{R}
Kairatbek Tugolbaev (KGZ)	4
Rasul Chunayev (AZE)	9
Franck Hassli (MON)	1
Zhang Ridong (CHN)	1
Adam Kurak (RUS)	6
Justin Lester (USA)	8
Bálint Korpási (HUN)	0
Kazuhiro Hanayama (JPN)	0
Yunus Özel (TUR)	2

Round of 16
Tsimur Berdyieu (BLR)	8
Vojtech Jakus (SVK)	0
Varsham Boranyan (ARM)	0
Kairatbek Tugolbaev (KGZ)	5
Rasul Chunayev (AZE)	9
Adam Kurak (RUS)	0
Justin Lester (USA)	8
Yunus Özel (TUR)	6

Quarterfinals
Tsimur Berdyieu (BLR)	8
Kairatbek Tugolbaev (KGZ)	0
Rasul Chunayev (AZE)	9
Justin Lester (USA)	0

Semifinals
Tsimur Berdyieu (BLR)	0
Rasul Chunayev (AZE)	8

=== Bottom half ===
Round of 32
Matthias Maasch (GER)	5
Petter Karlsen (NOR)	0
Aleksandar Maksimović (SRB)	0
Afshin Biabangard (IRI)	5
Danijel Janečić (CRO)	8
Aziz Boualem (MAR)	0
Svilen Kostadinov (BUL)	2
Darkhan Bayakhmetov (KAZ)	5
Zakarias Tallroth (SWE)	3
Goga Apriamashvili (GEO)	2
Filip Dubský (CZE)	7
Ion Luchiţă (MDA)	8
Armen Vardanyan (UKR)	10
Nurbek Kholmukhammatov (UZB)	5
Mohammed Rafiq Holi (IND)	4
Akrem Boudjemline (ALG)	7

Round of 16
Matthias Maasch (GER)	5
Afshin Biabangard (IRI)	3
Danijel Janečić (CRO)	0
Darkhan Bayakhmetov (KAZ)	5
Zakarias Tallroth (SWE)	14
Ion Luchiţă (MDA)	6
Armen Vardanyan (UKR)	10
Akrem Boudjemline (ALG)	2

Quarterfinals
Matthias Maasch (GER)	4
Darkhan Bayakhmetov (KAZ)	4
Zakarias Tallroth (SWE)	0
Armen Vardanyan (UKR)	9

Semifinals
Matthias Maasch (GER)	1
Armen Vardanyan (UKR)	2^{F}

=== Repechage ===
Repechage round 1
Franck Hassli (MON)	0
Adam Kurak (RUS)	12
Nurbek Kholmukhammatov (UZB)	4
Akrem Boudjemline (ALG)	4

Repechage round 2
Adam Kurak (RUS)	10
Justin Lester (USA)	9
Akrem Boudjemline (ALG)	2
Zakarias Tallroth (SWE)	10

Bronze medals
Adam Kurak (RUS)	4
Tsimur Berdyieu (BLR)	0
Zakarias Tallroth (SWE)	3
Matthias Maasch (GER)	0
