= 2014 European Wrestling Championships – Men's Greco-Roman 66 kg =

Wrestling competitions

The Men's Greco-Roman 66 kg is a competition featured at the 2014 European Wrestling Championships, and was held in Vantaa, Finland on 5 April 2014.

== Medalists ==
Gold	Adam Kurak; Russia
Silver	Hasan Aliyev; Azerbaijan
Bronze	Frank Stäbler; Germany
Bronze	István Lévai; Slovakia

== Results ==
Legend

- C — Won by 3 cautions given to the opponent
- F — Won by fall

=== Final ===
Final
Hasan Aliyev (AZE)	2
Adam Kurak (RUS)	2^{C}

=== Top half ===
Round of 32
Vladimiros Matias (GRE)	8
Filip Dubský (CZE)	0
Davor Štefanek (SRB)	3
Frank Stäbler (GER)	5
Hasan Aliyev (AZE)	8
Marius Thommesen (NOR)	0

Round of 16
Dawid Kareciński (POL)	4
István Kozák (HUN)	0
Anders Ekström (DEN)	0
Konstantin Stas (BUL)	1
Davide Cascavilla (ITA)	0
Vladimiros Matias (GRE)	9
Frank Stäbler (GER)	0
Hasan Aliyev (AZE)	9

Quarterfinals
Dawid Kareciński (POL)	7
Konstantin Stas (BUL)	2
Vladimiros Matias (GRE)	1
Hasan Aliyev (AZE)	8

Semifinals
Dawid Kareciński (POL)	0
Hasan Aliyev (AZE)	6

=== Bottom half ===
Round of 32
Hugo Passos (POR)	0
Tero Välimäki (FIN)	8
Tomi Hinoveanu (ROU)	4^{F}
Yaraslau Kardash (BLR)	1
Atakan Yüksel (TUR)	3
Aram Julfalakyan (ARM)	3
Dominik Etlinger (CRO)	0
István Lévai (SVK)	8^{F}
Denys Demyankov (UKR)	6
Mihail Cosnicean (MDA)	4
Edgaras Venckaitis (LTU)	5
Kristaps Kalnakārklis (LAT)	0
Danielo Di Feola (SWE)	2
Benedikt Puffer (AUT)	3
Adam Kurak (RUS)	9
Revaz Lashkhi (GEO)	0

Round of 16
Tero Välimäki (FIN)	8
Tomi Hinoveanu (ROU)	0
Aram Julfalakyan (ARM)	1
István Lévai (SVK)	9
Denys Demyankov (UKR)	10
Edgaras Venckaitis (LTU)	1
Benedikt Puffer (AUT)	0
Adam Kurak (RUS)	10

Quarterfinals
Tero Välimäki (FIN)	0
István Lévai (SVK)	4^{F}
Denys Demyankov (UKR)	1
Adam Kurak (RUS)	6

Semifinals
István Lévai (SVK)	2
Adam Kurak (RUS)	10

=== Repechage ===
Repechage round 1
Marius Thommesen (NOR)	1
Frank Stäbler (GER)	8
Revaz Lashkhi (GEO)	6
Benedikt Puffer (AUT)	0

Repechage round 2
Frank Stäbler (GER)	8^{F}
Vladimiros Matias (GRE)	0
Revaz Lashkhi (GEO)	7^{F}
Denys Demyankov (UKR)	1

Bronze medals
Frank Stäbler (GER)	1
Dawid Kareciński (POL)	0
Revaz Lashkhi (GEO)	0
István Lévai (SVK)	3
