= Saleev =

Saleev or Saleyev (Russian: Салеев) is a Russian masculine surname, its feminine counterpart is Saleeva or Saleyeva. Notable people with the surname include:

- Evgeny Saleev (born 1989), Russian wrestler
