= Wrestling at the 2006 Asian Games – Men's Greco-Roman 74 kg =

Men's Greco-Roman 74 kg at the 2006 Asian Games
- Venue: Aspire Hall 4
- Date: 9 December 2006
- Competitors: 12 from 12 nations

Medalists
| gold medal | Roman Melyoshin | Kazakhstan |
| silver medal | Davoud Abedinzadeh | Iran |
| bronze medal | Bakhit Sharif Badr | Qatar |
| bronze medal | Daniar Kobonov | Kyrgyzstan |

The men's Greco-Roman 74 kilograms wrestling competition at the 2006 Asian Games in Doha was held on 9 December 2006 at the Aspire Hall 4.

This Greco-Roman wrestling competition consisted of a single-elimination tournament, with a repechage used to determine the winner of two bronze medals. The two finalists faced off for gold and silver medals. Each wrestler who lost to one of the two finalists moved into the repechage, culminating in a pair of bronze medal matches featuring the semifinal losers each facing the remaining repechage opponent from their half of the bracket.

Each bout consisted of up to three rounds, lasting two minutes apiece. The wrestler who scored more points in each round was the winner of that rounds; the bout finished when one wrestler had won two rounds (and thus the match).

== Schedule ==
All times are Arabia Standard Time (UTC+03:00)

| Date | Time | Event |
|---|---|---|
| Saturday, 9 December 2006 | 09:00 | Preliminary |
| Saturday, 9 December 2006 | 09:00 | Quarterfinals |
| Saturday, 9 December 2006 | 09:00 | Semifinals |
| Saturday, 9 December 2006 | 09:00 | Repechages |
| Saturday, 9 December 2006 | 18:00 | Finals |

== Results ==
Legend

- F — Won by fall

=== Main bracket ===
Preliminary
Sanjay Kumar (IND) | 0 | 1
Taichi Suga (JPN) | 6 | 4
Ali Kadhim (IRQ) | 0 | 1
Daniar Kobonov (KGZ) | 3 | 3
Davoud Abedinzadeh (IRI) | 4 | 2
Daýanç Gulgeldiýew (TKM) | 0 | 1
Choi Duk-hoon (KOR) | 0 | 1
Denis Zdorikov (UZB) | 3 | 1

Quarterfinals
Bakhit Sharif Badr (QAT) | 5 | 0 | 4
Michael Baletin (PHI) | 0 | 4 | 3
Roman Melyoshin (KAZ) | 8 | 4^{F}
Majed Farhan (KSA) | 0 | 0
Taichi Suga (JPN) | 0 | 0
Daniar Kobonov (KGZ) | 3 | 5
Davoud Abedinzadeh (IRI) | 1 | 3 | 1
Denis Zdorikov (UZB) | 1 | 0 | 1

Semifinals
Bakhit Sharif Badr (QAT) | 0 | 0
Roman Melyoshin (KAZ) | 6 | 7
Daniar Kobonov (KGZ) | 1 | 7 | 1
Davoud Abedinzadeh (IRI) | 1 | 0 | 2

Gold medal match
Roman Melyoshin (KAZ) | 2 | 5
Davoud Abedinzadeh (IRI) | 2 | 1

=== Repechage ===
Repechage
Daýanç Gulgeldiýew (TKM) | 0 | 0
Denis Zdorikov (UZB) | 2 | 2

Bronze medal match
Majed Farhan (KSA) | 1 | 2
Bakhit Sharif Badr (QAT) | 5 | 6
Denis Zdorikov (UZB) | 0 | 3 | 1
Daniar Kobonov (KGZ) | 3 | 0 | 4

== Final standing ==
| Rank | Athlete |
|---|---|
| 1st place, gold medalist(s) | Roman Melyoshin (KAZ) |
| 2nd place, silver medalist(s) | Davoud Abedinzadeh (IRI) |
| 3rd place, bronze medalist(s) | Bakhit Sharif Badr (QAT) |
| 3rd place, bronze medalist(s) | Daniar Kobonov (KGZ) |
| 5 | Majed Farhan (KSA) |
| 5 | Denis Zdorikov (UZB) |
| 7 | Taichi Suga (JPN) |
| 8 | Michael Baletin (PHI) |
| 9 | Choi Duk-hoon (KOR) |
| 10 | Ali Kadhim (IRQ) |
| 11 | Daýanç Gulgeldiýew (TKM) |
| 11 | Sanjay Kumar (IND) |
