= Wrestling at the 2015 European Games – Men's Greco-Roman 80 kg =

Men's Greco-Roman 80 kg at the 2015 European Games
- Venue: Heydar Aliyev Arena
- Date: 13 June
- Competitors: 19 from 19 nations

Medalists
gold medal	Evgeny Saleev	Russia
silver medal	Rafig Huseynov	Azerbaijan
bronze medal	Daniel Aleksandrov	Bulgaria
bronze medal	Viktar Sasunouski	Belarus

Men's Greco-Roman 80 kg competition at the 2015 European Games in Baku, Azerbaijan, took place on 13 June at the Heydar Aliyev Arena.

== Schedule ==
All times are Azerbaijan Summer Time (UTC+05:00)

Date	Time	Event
Saturday, 13 June 2015	10:00	Qualifications
Saturday, 13 June 2015	11:00	1/8 finals
Saturday, 13 June 2015	13:00	Quarterfinals
Saturday, 13 June 2015	13:00	Semifinals
Saturday, 13 June 2015	15:00	Repechage
Saturday, 13 June 2015	19:00	Finals

== Results ==
=== Final ===
Final
(Azerbaijan) Rafig Huseynov (AZE)	0
(Russia) Evgeny Saleev (RUS)	2

=== Top half ===
Qualifications

1/8 finals
(Azerbaijan) Rafig Huseynov (AZE)	11
(Austria) Michael Wagner (AUT)	0
(Croatia) Božo Starčević (CRO)	3
(Bulgaria) Daniel Aleksandrov (BUL)	7
(Serbia) Petar Balo (SRB)	0
(Sweden) Alexander Jersgren (SWE)	2
(Turkey) Selçuk Çebi (TUR)	8
(Latvia) Česlavs Bestenis (LAT)	0

Quarterfinals
(Azerbaijan) Rafig Huseynov (AZE)	10
(Bulgaria) Daniel Aleksandrov (BUL)	0
(Sweden) Alexander Jersgren (SWE)	0
(Turkey) Selçuk Çebi (TUR)	4

Semifinals
(Azerbaijan) Rafig Huseynov (AZE)	9
(Turkey) Selçuk Çebi (TUR)	0

=== Bottom half ===
Qualifications
(Switzerland) Jonas Bossert (SUI)	2
(Georgia (country)) Lasha Gobadze (GEO)	3
(Germany) Florian Neumaier (GER)	1
(Hungary) Zoltán Kéri (HUN)	0
(Moldova) Igor Besleaga (MDA)	7
(Czech Republic) Pavel Powada (CZE)	4

1/8 finals
(Lithuania) Julius Matuzevičius (LTU)	1
(Greece) Nikolaos Varkas (GRE)	1
(Ukraine) Oleksandr Shyshman (UKR)	0
(Russia) Evgeny Saleev (RUS)	4
(Belarus) Viktar Sasunouski (BLR)	9
(Georgia (country)) Lasha Gobadze (GEO)	0
(Germany) Florian Neumaier (GER)	4
(Moldova) Igor Besleaga (MDA)	0

Quarterfinals
(Lithuania) Julius Matuzevičius (LTU)	0
(Russia) Evgeny Saleev (RUS)	9
(Belarus) Viktar Sasunouski (BLR)	4
(Germany) Florian Neumaier (GER)	3

Semifinals
(Russia) Evgeny Saleev (RUS)	12
(Belarus) Viktar Sasunouski (BLR)	4

=== Repechage ===
Repechage round 1
(Austria) Michael Wagner (AUT)	0
(Bulgaria) Daniel Aleksandrov (BUL)	8
(Ukraine) Oleksandr Shyshman (UKR)	9
(Lithuania) Julius Matuzevičius (LTU)	8

Bronze medal match
(Bulgaria) Daniel Aleksandrov (BUL)	3
(Turkey) Selçuk Çebi (TUR)	2
(Ukraine) Oleksandr Shyshman (UKR)	0
(Belarus) Viktar Sasunouski (BLR)	6
