= Handbook of Christianity in China =

Two-volume series on the history of Christianity in China

- Edited by: Nicholas Standaert (vol. I); Gary Tiedemann (vol. II)
- Language: English
- Genre: History
- Publisher: Brill
- Published: 2001 (vol. I); 2009 (vol. II)
- OCLC: 45699554

The Handbook of Christianity in China is a two-volume series on the history of Christianity in China, edited respectively by Nicholas Standaert and Gary Tiedemann. It is a part of the Handbook of Oriental Studies series published by Brill.

== Volumes ==
=== Volume One: 635–1800 ===
The first volume covers the history of Christianity in China in the Tang dynasty, the Yuan dynasty, and the period from late Ming dynasty to the middle of the Qing dynasty. It is edited by Nicholas Standaert. In each period, the primary and secondary sources and introduced in the "Sources" section, followed by the main figures ("Actors"), geographical context ("Scene"), and "Themes". It was published in 2001.

The scholar Ryan Dunch called the first volume a "monumental work" that is "indispensable [...] for decades to come." The historian Morris Rossabi echoed on the volume being "monumental" and praised its usefulness. The scholar Willard J. Peterson also called the volume "indispensable" for researchers.

=== Volume Two: 1800–present ===
The second volume covers three periods: "1800–1911", "1911–1949", and "1950–present". It follows the "Sources"-"Actors"-"Scene"-"Themes" structure. It is edited by Gary Tiedemann and published in 2009.

The religious scholar Chloë Starr recommended the volume, but also noted its imbalances on certain topics and perspectives: according to Starr, there is little on the worship of Chinese churches, Chinese clergy and theologians, and recent developments. The scholar Jonathan A. Seitz praised the book for its ecumenical nature, abundance of sources, and coherent structure.

== Sources ==
=== Journal articles ===
- Dunch, Ryan (Oct 2001). "Book Review: Handbook of Christianity in China, Vol. 1: 635–1800". International Bulletin of Missionary Research. 25 (4): 183–184. doi:10.1177/239693930102500414.
- Peterson, Willard J. (January 2003). "Handbook of Christianity in China. Volume One: 635-1800 (review)". The Catholic Historical Review. 89 (1): 131–135. doi:10.1353/cat.2003.0080.
- Rossabi, Morris (29 October 2001). "Handbook of Christianity in China, Volume One: 635–1800. Edited by Nicolas Standaert. pp. 964. Leiden, Brill, 2001". Journal of the Royal Asiatic Society. 11 (3): 393–394. doi:10.1017/S1356186301290348.
- Seitz, Jonathan A. (January 2011). "Review of "Handbook of Christianity in China, Volume Two: 1800-Present"". Missiology: An International Review. 39: 114–115. doi:10.1177/009182961103900119.
- Starr, Chloë (Jul 2010). "Book Review: Handbook of Christianity in China. Vol. 2: 1800—Present". International Bulletin of Missionary Research. 34 (3): 179–180. doi:10.1177/239693931003400315.
