= Davoud Abedinzadeh =

Iranian wrestler (born 1986)

Medal record

Representing Iran

Men's Greco-Roman wrestling

Asian Games
Silver medal – second place	2006 Doha	74 kg

Asian Championships
Gold medal – first place	2006 Almaty	74 kg
Bronze medal – third place	2010 New Delhi	84 kg

World Junior Championships
Gold medal – first place	2005 Vilnius	74 kg
Silver medal – second place	2006 Guatemala-City	74 kg

Asian Cadet Championships
Gold medal – first place	2003 Feng Yuang City	69 kg

Takhti cup
Gold medal – first place	2016 Tehran	85 kg
Silver medal – second place	2015 Kermanshah	85 kg

Wrestling World Cup
Gold medal – first place	2014 Tehran	Team
Gold medal – first place	2011 Minsk	Team
Silver medal – second place	2007 Antalya	Team
Bronze medal – third place	2015 Tehran	Team

Yadegar Emam
Gold medal – first place	2006 Qom	74 kg
Gold medal – first place	2010 Qom	85 kg
Bronze medal – third place	2014 Tehran	98 kg

Club World Championship
Gold medal – first place	2014 Abadan	Team
Gold medal – first place	2016 Budapest	Team

Davoud Abedinzadeh Chadorchi (Persian: داوود عابدین زاده چادرچی, born August 29, 1986, in Tehran) is an Iranian wrestler.

== Education ==
Abedinzadeh has a bachelor's degree in Physical Education from Azad Islamic University.
