= 2017 European Wrestling Championships – Men's Greco-Roman 75 kg =

The Men's Greco-Roman 75 kg is a competition featured at the 2017 European Wrestling Championships, and was held in Novi Sad, Serbia on May 7, 2017.

== Medalists ==
Gold	Tarek Abdelslam (BUL)
Silver	Chingiz Labazanov (RUS)
Bronze	Kazbek Kilou (BLR)
Bronze	Tamás Lőrincz (HUN)

== Results ==
Legend

- F — Won by fall

=== Final ===
Final
Chingiz Labazanov (RUS)	1
Tarek Abdelslam (BUL)	4

=== Top half ===
Round of 32

Round of 16
Oldřich Varga (CZE)	1
Kazbek Kilou (BLR)	10
Chingiz Labazanov (RUS)	2
George Mariea (ROU)	0
Rajbek Bisultanov (DEN)	1
Ruhin Mikayilov (AZE)	2
Mantas Sinkevičius (LTU)	0
Ievgen Pyshkov (UKR)	11

Quarterfinals
Kazbek Kilou (BLR)	1
Chingiz Labazanov (RUS)	2
Ruhin Mikayilov (AZE)	4
Ievgen Pyshkov (UKR)	3

Semifinals
Chingiz Labazanov (RUS)	4
Ruhin Mikayilov (AZE)	1

=== Bottom half ===
Round of 32
Manfred Edsberg (SWE)	2
Georgios Prevolarakis (GRE)	9
Ciro Russo (ITA)	0
Mihail Bradu (MDA)	8
Karapet Chalyan (ARM)	6
Viktor Nemeš (SRB)	2
Arkadiusz Kułynycz (POL)	1
Emrah Kuş (TUR)	2
Florian Neumeier (GER)	2
Gela Bolkvadze (GEO)	3
Tamás Lőrincz (HUN)	8
Tero Halmesmäki (FIN)	0

Round of 16
Tarek Abdelslam (BUL)	8
Damian Dietsche (SUI)	0
Georgios Prevolarakis (GRE)	7
Mihail Bradu (MDA)	10^{F}
Karapet Chalyan (ARM)	2
Emrah Kuş (TUR)	1
Gela Bolkvadze (GEO)	1
Tamás Lőrincz (HUN)	2

Quarterfinals
Tarek Abdelslam (BUL)	9
Mihail Bradu (MDA)	0
Karapet Chalyan (ARM)	0
Tamás Lőrincz (HUN)	4

Semifinals
Tarek Abdelslam (BUL)	5
Tamás Lőrincz (HUN)	2

=== Repechage ===
Repechage round 2
George Mariea (ROU)	0
Kazbek Kilou (BLR)	8
Damian Dietsche (SUI)	2
Mihail Bradu (MDA)	6

Bronze medals
Kazbek Kilou (BLR)	9
Ruhin Mikayilov (AZE)	1
Mihail Bradu (MDA)	0
Tamás Lőrincz (HUN)	8^{F}
