= Justin Lester =

Notable people named Justin Lester include:

- Justin Lester (politician) (born 1978), a New Zealand politician
- Justin Lester (wrestler) (born 1983), an American Greco-Roman wrestler
