= Russian concession of Tianjin =

Former Russian possession in China

Russian Concession of Tianjin
- 1900–1924
- Flag

- The Russian concession in green Other concessions in light green
- Status: Concession of Russia
- History
  - Established by the Tianjin Concession clause: 1900
  - Relinquishment of the concession by the Soviet Union: 1924
Preceded by	Succeeded by
Qing dynasty	Beiyang government
- Today part of: China

The Russian concession of Tianjin (Chinese: 天津俄租界, pinyin: Tiānjīn é zūjiè, Russian: Российская концессия Тяньцзиня) was a territory (concession) in the Chinese city of Tientsin occupied colonially by the Russian Empire between 1900 and 1924, and one of the Russian concessions in the late Qing dynasty (others including the Russian concessions in Hankou, Dalian, Harbin, and Port Arthur). The concession is second to the British concession of Tianjin by size, stretching from the coast of the Hai River to the farmlands south of Dazhigu district.

== History ==
Following the occupation of Tianjin by the Eight Nation Alliance following the Boxer Rebellion in 1900, Russia signed the Tianjin Concession Clause on November 9, 1900, officially delimiting the Russian concession. A brief dispute over the Laolongtou railway station being within the borders of the concession led to negotiations between Britain and Russia in St. Petersburg, leading to Russia giving up the railway station and the road leading to it back to China. Thus, the Russian concession became two parcels of land, the Eastern and Western District. Though the Russian concession was originally the largest concession, occupying a total area of approximately 5971 mu, the British concession soon beat the concession by land size through expansions.

Following the October Revolution, the concession continued to be controlled by the loyalist Russian White movement, though the concession de facto ended when the Beiyang government and the Tianjin police department occupied the concession on September 15, 1920. On August 6, 1924, the new Soviet government officially relinquished the territory to the Beiyang government, and the concession was transformed into the 3rd district of the Tianjin Special Administrative Region.

== Economy ==
The Russian concession failed to develop into a prosperous sector or commercial and trading activity, overshadowed by the British concession that became the most important financial district of Tianjin. Some Russian enterprises, like the Russo-Chinese Bank, operated in the British concession instead. Later, the Tianjin-Russian Concession developed into Tianjin's industrial and storage area due to its long river bank and proximity to the Laolongtou railway station, where Texaco, Mobil, and Asia Minor established oil warehouses. In 1919, British American Tobacco also set up factories in the Russian concession.

== Gallery ==
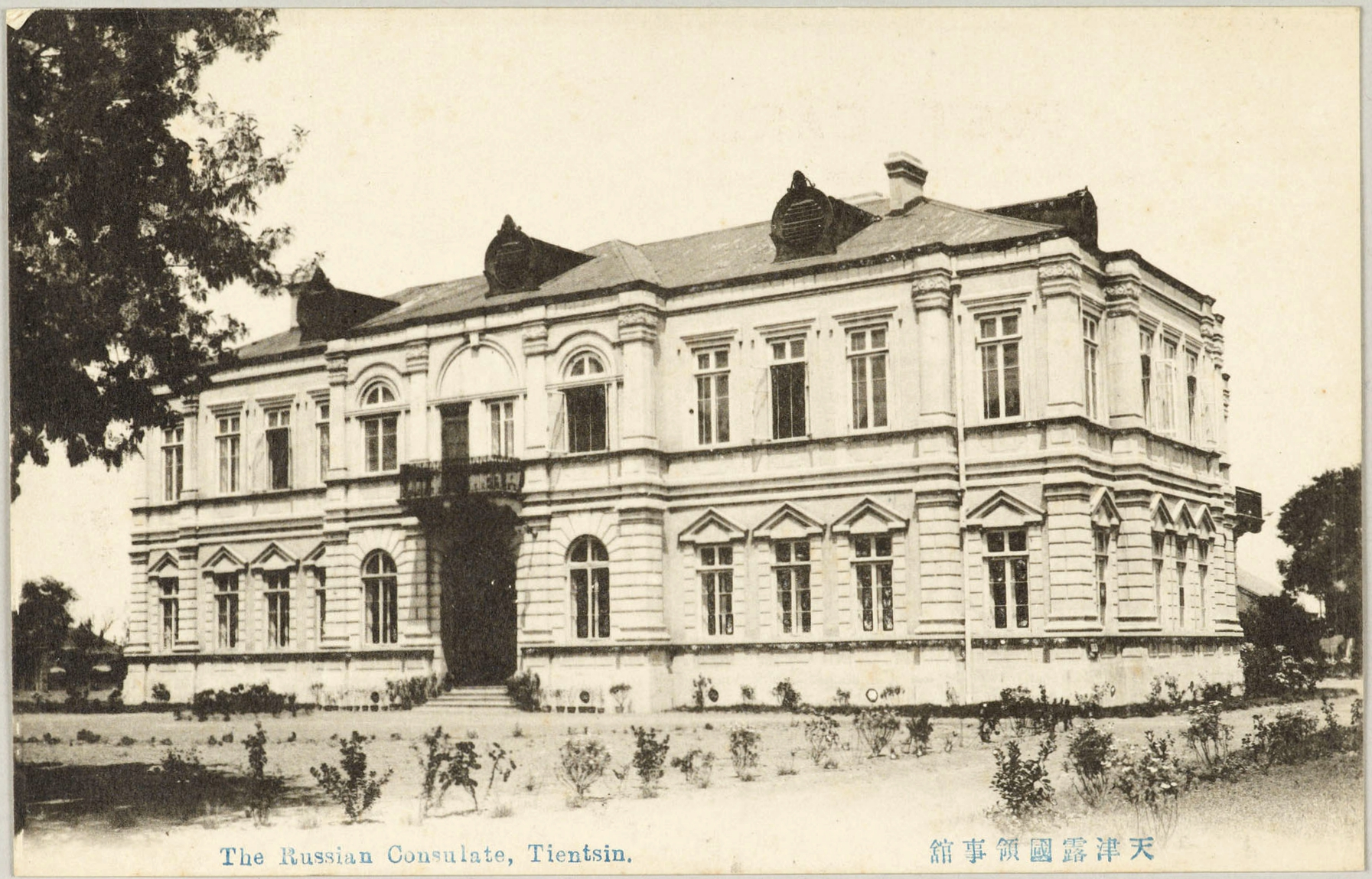
The Russian consulate of Tianjin

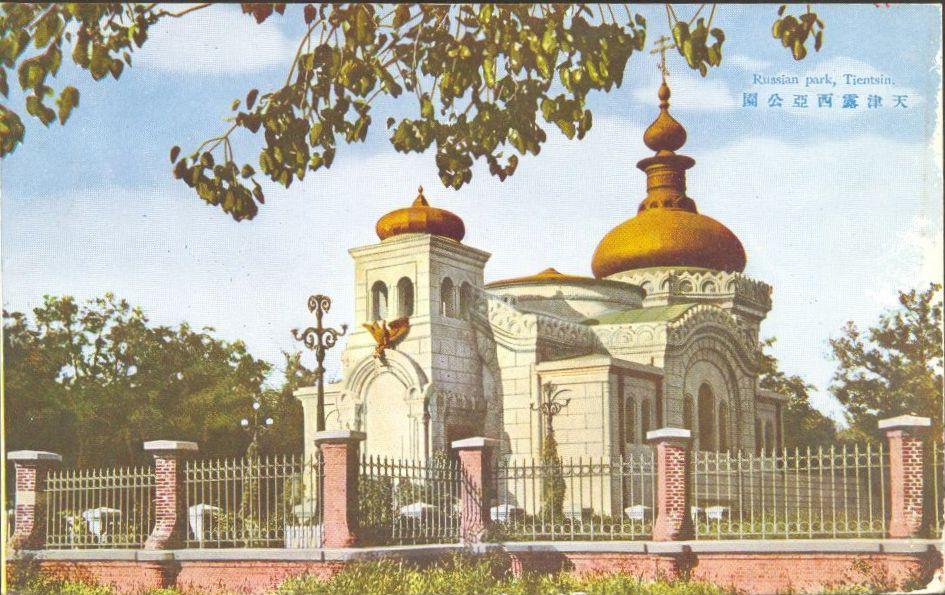
The Church of Our Lady in Tianjin

== List of consuls ==
- Nikolai Vasilievich Laptev (1903–1907)
- Nikolai Maksimovich Poppe (1907–1909)
- Nikolai Sergeievich Muliukin (1909–1910, acting)
- Khristophor Petrovic Kristi (1910–1913)
- Konstantin Viktorovich Uspensky (1913–1914, acting)
- Pyotr Genrikhovich Tiedemann (1914–1920)

== See also ==
- Foreign concessions in Tianjin
- Foreign concessions in China
- Map of concessions in Tianjin (in Chinese)
- Russian Empire
- List of former foreign enclaves in China
