= Thijmen =

Tijmen (sometimes translated as Tymen or Thymen), sometimes written with the 'h', is a masculine given name of Dutch origin. Notable people with the name include:

- Thymen Arensman (born 1999), Dutch cyclist
- Thijmen Blokzijl (born 2005), Dutch footballer
- Thijmen Goppel (born 1997), Dutch footballer
- Thijmen Jacobsz Hinlopen (1572–1637), Dutch trader
- Thijmen Koopmans (1929–2015), Dutch judge at the European Court of Justice
- Thijmen Kupers (born 1991), Dutch middle-distance runner
- Thijmen Nijhuis (born 1998), Dutch footballer
- Tijmen van der Helm (born 2004), Dutch racing driver

== See also ==
- Tiedemann, variation of same name
