= Yeni Şərif =

- Municipality
- Location within Azerbaijan Location within Shaki-Zagatala Economic Region
- Coordinates: 41°44′18″N 46°14′06″E
- Country: Azerbaijan
- Rayon: Balakan

Population
  - Total: 3,086
- Time zone: UTC+4 (AZT)
  - Summer (DST): UTC+5 (AZT)

Yeni Şərif (also, Sharif and Sharifoba) is a village and municipality in the Balakan Rayon of Azerbaijan. It has a population of 3,086.
