= Pyotr Genrikhovich Tiedemann =

Russian nobleman and diplomat

Tiedemann and wife, c. 1902

Pyotr Genrikhovich Tiedemann (Петр Генрихович Тидеманн; (Note: Pyotr is also transliterated Piotr or Petr.) 14 October 1872 – 25 June 1941) was a Russian nobleman and diplomat who served mainly in China.

Tiedemann was born on 14 October 1872 in Kazan, the son of Genrikh Ottonovich Tiedemann (1839–1889), a nobleman of German Lutheran origin and an Active State Councillor, and Tat’iana Petrovna (née Savel’eva, died 1877), the daughter of a Russian Orthodox doctor. Tiedemann had six siblings: Ekaterina (born 1868), Anna (born 1870), Maks (1875–1917), Boris (born 1879), Tat’iana (born 1881) and Vadim (1888–1926).

Tiedemann studied at the Third Classical Gymnasium in Saint Petersburg. There, after graduation, he attended the University of Saint Petersburg, studying in the Department of Oriental Languages, where he graduated in 1894. In 1895 he joined the Ministry of Foreign Affairs. He was soon posted to Japan briefly, then China, where he rose steadily through the ranks. He was a student intern at the Russian embassy in Beijing (Peking) from 1896 to 1898, when he temporarily took over the consulate in Fuzhou (Foochow) until 1899. In 1900–01 he served as a secretary and translator at the diplomatic office in Dalian (Port Arthur), capital of the Russian leased territory of Kwantung oblast. On 6 October 1902, he married Adelaida Mikhailovna Skriabin, daughter of the Active State Councillor Mikhail D. Skriabin and of Orthodox background. They had a son, Dimitry (born 1906), and two daughters, Tat’iana (born 1903) and Adialeida (born 1905). In 1902–05 he was vice-consul at Zhifu (Yantai) and then in 1906–07 consul in Mukden (Shenyang).

In 1907 Tiedemann left China to assist the diplomatic office of the Governor-General of Priamur in Khabarovsk. In 1908 he was back in China, serving as the Russian consul in British Hong Kong. In 1910 he sent Saint Petersburg scathing and detailed reports of the effect of the Portuguese Revolution in Macau, especially lamenting the anticlerical radicalism of certain elements in the Macanese garrison. On 14 November 1911, Tiedemann received Portuguese permission to visit Macau; an ancestor of his had moved to Macau in 1772 and died there. In 1911 he was made consul at Yingkou (Niuzhuang). In 1914 he moved to the Russian concession of Tianjin to act as consul and in 1915 he was promoted to consul general. In 1917 the February Revolution removed the Tsar and then the October Revolution instituted a soviet republic. In 1920 diplomatic relations between China and Russia—in the midst of the Russian Civil War—were severed, and Tiedemann was without a job. From 1921 through 1934 he was on the municipal council of the Third Special District (the former Russian concession) in Tianjin. He worked to help White Russians, fleeing the Soviets, pass through. In 1925, his wife died.

In 1934 Tiedemann requested and received permission to reside temporarily in Britain. From 1934 through 1937 he was on the municipal council of the British concession in Hankou. In 1937 he moved permanently to Montreal in Canada, where his son Dimitry was already living. He died there on 25 June 1941. He was cremated, a memorial service being held at noon on 26 June at the Orthodox Cathedral of Saint Peter and Saint Paul.
