= Adam Kurak =

Russian Greco-Roman wrestler

Personal information
- Full name: Adam Mikhaylovich Kurak
- Nationality: (Russia) Russian
- Born: 26 June 1985 (age 41) Yeniseysk, Krasnoyarsk Krai, Soviet Union
- Weight: 72 kg (159 lb); 66 kg (146 lb)

Sport
- Country: Russia
- Sport: Wrestling
- Event: Greco-Roman
- Club: Krasnoyarsk GR Club
Medal record
Men's Freestyle wrestling
Representing Russia
World Championships
Bronze medal – third place	2015 Las Vegas	71 kg
European Championships
Gold medal – first place	2018 Kaspiysk	72 kg
Gold medal – first place	2014 Vantaa	66 kg
Silver medal – second place	2013 Tbilisi	66 kg
Golden Grand Prix Ivan Poddubny
Gold medal – first place	2014 Tymen	66 kg
Bronze medal – third place	2016 Tymen	66 kg
Bronze medal – third place	2011 Tymen	66 kg

Adam Mikhaylovich Kurak (Russian: Адам Михайлович Курак, born 26 June 1985 in Yeniseysk) is a Russian former Greco-Roman wrestler. He won a gold medal at the national championships in 2009, a silver medal in 2010 and bronze medals in 2011 and 2012. In 2013, he won a silver medal of the 2013 European Wrestling Championships. In 2014 at the Ivan Poddubny Golden Grand Prix won gold medal. Kurak won his first medal at a worlds at the 2015 World Wrestling Championships, where he lost to Rasul Chunayev but got back and won a bronze medal defeating Tsimur Berdyieu of Belarus. Kurak avenged his 2015 World Wrestling Championships loss to Chunayev, by defeating him in the 2018 European Wrestling Championships and ultimately won the gold medal in the final match of the category.

Kurak is international master of sports in Greco-Roman Wrestling
