= Chingiz Labazanov =

Russian Greco-Roman wrestler

Chingiz Labazanov Чингиз Лабазанов
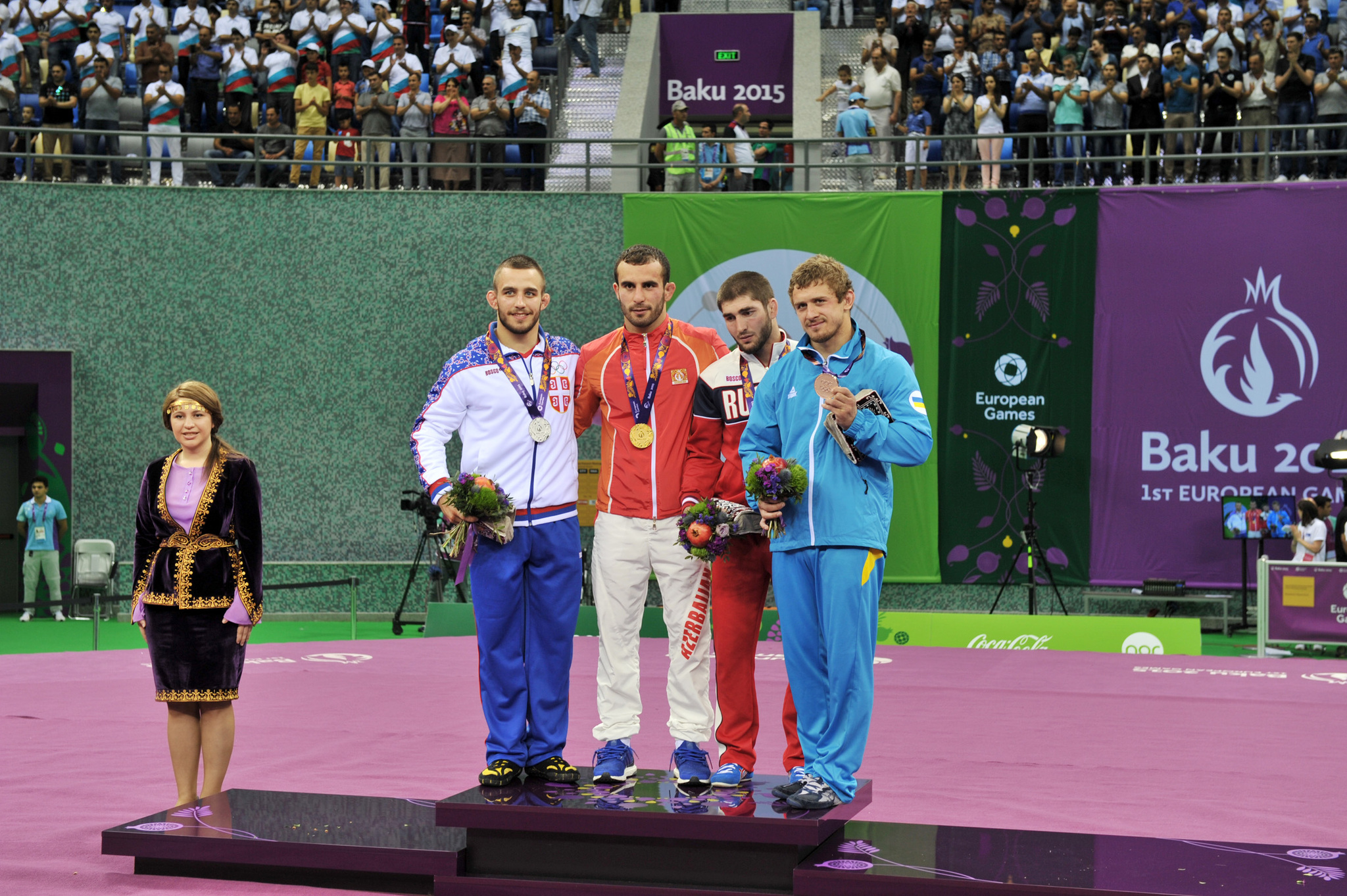
- Labazanov after the 2015 European Games.

Personal information
- Full name: Chingiz Suleimanovich Labazanov
- National team: Russia
- Born: 18 April 1991 (age 35) Martynovsky District, Rostov Oblast, Russian SFSR, USSR
- Height: 1.72 m (5 ft 8 in)
- Weight: 71 kg (157 lb); 75 kg (165 lb)

Sport
- Country: Russia
- Sport: Wrestling
- Event: Greco-Roman
- Club: KSVSM (Saint-Petersburg)
- Coached by: Abomuslim Dugachev, Ashot Chubarov, Gasymali Gasymov, Rustem Mambetov
Medal record
Men's Greco-Roman wrestling
Representing Russia
World Championships
Gold medal – first place	2014 Tashkent	71 kg
World Cup
Silver medal – second place	2014 Tehran	71 kg
Silver medal – second place	2015 Tehran	71 kg
European Games
Bronze medal – third place	2015 Baku	75 kg
European Championships
Silver medal – second place	2017 Novi Sad	75 kg

Chingiz Suleimanovich Labazanov (Russian: Чингиз Сулейманович Лабазанов; born 18 April 1991) is a Russian former Greco-Roman wrestler of Chechen heritage. 2014 senior world champion, 2017 European runner-up, 3x Russian national champion.

== Sport career ==
He is the 2014 senior world champion and 2014 world cup silver medalist as a team member. In 2015, he finished in first place at the Russian championships, after he was with the silver medal at the World Cup in Shiraz, Iran and took a bronze medal from the European Games in Baku, Azerbaijan. In 2016, he was the winner of the 2016 Golden Grand Prix Ivan Poddubny, where he beat 2 time Olympic gold medalist Roman Vlasov in the final match. In 2017, he won the Golden Grand Prix Ivan Poddubny again and became European championships runner-up.

== Wrestling achievements ==
- 2011 Junior world championships — 1st.
- 2014, 2015, 2021 Russian championships — 1st.
- 2014 World championships — 1st.
- 2014, 2015 World cup — 2nd.
- 2015 European Games — 3rd.
- 2016 Russian championships — 2nd.
- 2017 European Championships — 2nd.
- 2019 Russian championships — 3rd.

== Personal life ==
He has an older brother, Olympian Ibragim Labazanov.
