= R. G. Tiedemann =

German historian (1941–2019)

- Born: 8 February 1941; Hartenholm, Schleswig-Holstein, Nazi Germany
- Died: 1 August 2019 (aged 78)
- Occupation: Historian
- Known for: Christianity in China
- Spouse: Liliana

Academic background
- Education: SOAS University of London; University of Wisconsin–Milwaukee

Academic work
- Discipline: History of Christianity in China; Missiology
- Institutions: SOAS University of London

Rolf Gerhard Tiedemann (8 February 1941 – 1 August 2019), better known as R. G. Tiedemann or Gary Tiedemann (Chinese: 狄德滿; pinyin: Dí Démǎn), was a German historian of Christianity in China.

== Biography ==
Born in Hartenholm, Schleswig-Holstein in wartime Germany, Tiedemann left school as a teenager. At 21 he settled with family in Wisconsin, and was later drafted to train in the US army's Medical Training Unit in Texas during the Vietnam War. He completed a BA at University of Wisconsin–Milwaukee, followed by an MA and a PhD at SOAS University of London. After taking several part-time posts, Tiedemann spent twenty years teaching Modern History of China in SOAS's Department of History, including a sabbatical at the Ricci Institute, University of San Francisco. After his retirement, he maintained a post as Professorial Research Associate at SOAS and as Professor of Chinese History, Shandong University, Jinan.

His research mainly concerned the history of Christianity in China, with a particular focus on Shandong and the Boxer Rebellion. He also edited the second volume of the Handbook of Christianity in China, which totalled over a thousand pages; about half of the entries he wrote himself. Tiedemann was also a review editor of Journal of Peasant Studies.

A festschrift was published in honor of Tiedemann, edited by two of his former students, entitled The Church as Safe Haven (2018).

Tiedemann died on 1 August 2019, after suffering from illness for many years.

== Works ==
- Tiedemann, R. G. (2009). Reference Guide to Christian Missionary Societies in China: From the 16th to the 20th Century. Armonk, N.Y.: M.E. Sharpe. ISBN 9781315497310.
- Bickers, Robert; Tiedemann, R. G., eds. (2007). The Boxers, China and the World. Lanham, MD: Rowman & Littlefield. ISBN 9780742553958.
- Tiedemann, R. G., ed. (2010). Handbook of Christianity in China, Vol. Two: 1800-Present. Leiden: Brill. ISBN 978-9004114302.
