= 2014 World Wrestling Championships =

- Host city: Tashkent, Uzbekistan
- Dates: 8–14 September 2014
- Stadium: Gymnastics Sport Palace

Champions
- Freestyle: Russia
- Greco-Roman: Iran
- Women: Japan

The 2014 UWW World Wrestling Championships were the 10th edition of World Wrestling Championships of combined events and were held from September 8 to 14 in Tashkent, Uzbekistan.

== Medal table ==
| Rank | Nation | Gold | Silver | Bronze | Total |
|---|---|---|---|---|---|
| 1 | Russia | 6 | 4 | 5 | 15 |
| 2 | Japan | 4 | 2 | 0 | 6 |
| 3 | Armenia | 2 | 0 | 0 | 2 |
| 4 | Iran | 1 | 4 | 4 | 9 |
| 5 | Turkey | 1 | 3 | 4 | 8 |
| 6 | Azerbaijan | 1 | 3 | 3 | 7 |
| 7 | United States | 1 | 1 | 4 | 6 |
| 8 | Cuba | 1 | 1 | 3 | 5 |
| 9 | Germany | 1 | 1 | 0 | 2 |
| 10 | Mongolia | 1 | 0 | 3 | 4 |
| 10 | Ukraine | 1 | 0 | 3 | 4 |
| 12 | Hungary | 1 | 0 | 2 | 3 |
| 12 | North Korea | 1 | 0 | 2 | 3 |
| 14 | France | 1 | 0 | 0 | 1 |
| 14 | Serbia | 1 | 0 | 0 | 1 |
| 16 | Sweden | 0 | 1 | 1 | 2 |
| 17 | Brazil | 0 | 1 | 0 | 1 |
| 17 | Croatia | 0 | 1 | 0 | 1 |
| 17 | Georgia | 0 | 1 | 0 | 1 |
| 17 | Poland | 0 | 1 | 0 | 1 |
| 21 | Belarus | 0 | 0 | 3 | 3 |
| 22 | Latvia | 0 | 0 | 2 | 2 |
| 22 | Uzbekistan | 0 | 0 | 2 | 2 |
| 24 | Bulgaria | 0 | 0 | 1 | 1 |
| 24 | Canada | 0 | 0 | 1 | 1 |
| 24 | China | 0 | 0 | 1 | 1 |
| 24 | Estonia | 0 | 0 | 1 | 1 |
| 24 | Lithuania | 0 | 0 | 1 | 1 |
| 24 | Moldova | 0 | 0 | 1 | 1 |
| 24 | Norway | 0 | 0 | 1 | 1 |
| Totals (30 entries) | | 24 | 24 | 48 | 96 |

== Team ranking ==
| Rank | Men's freestyle | | Men's Greco-Roman | | Women's freestyle | |
| Rank | Team | Points | Team | Points | Team | Points |
|---|---|---|---|---|---|---|
| 1 | Russia | 62 | Iran | 42 | Japan | 55 |
| 2 | Iran | 46 | Russia | 36 | Russia | 48 |
| 3 | Azerbaijan | 36 | Turkey | 34 | United States | 41 |
| 4 | Turkey | 33 | Azerbaijan | 32 | Ukraine | 29 |
| 5 | Cuba | 33 | Germany | 30 | Sweden | 27 |
| 6 | Mongolia | 30 | Armenia | 28 | Mongolia | 24 |
| 7 | Belarus | 28 | Hungary | 28 | Poland | 22 |
| 8 | Georgia | 23 | Sweden | 18 | Azerbaijan | 18 |
| 9 | United States | 20 | Cuba | 16 | Latvia; North Korea | 16 |
| 10 | Ukraine | 20 | Belarus | 16 | Latvia; North Korea | 16 |

== Medal summary ==
=== Men's freestyle ===
| Event | Gold | Silver | Bronze |
|---|---|---|---|
| 57 kg | Yang Kyong-il; North Korea | Vladimer Khinchegashvili; Georgia | Hassan Rahimi; Iran |
| 57 kg | Yang Kyong-il; North Korea | Vladimer Khinchegashvili; Georgia | Uladzislau Andreyeu; Belarus |
| 61 kg | Haji Aliyev; Azerbaijan | Masoud Esmaeilpour; Iran | Enkhsaikhany Nyam-Ochir; Mongolia |
| 61 kg | Haji Aliyev; Azerbaijan | Masoud Esmaeilpour; Iran | Yowlys Bonne; Cuba |
| 65 kg | Soslan Ramonov; Russia | Ahmad Mohammadi; Iran | Ganzorigiin Mandakhnaran; Mongolia |
| 65 kg | Soslan Ramonov; Russia | Ahmad Mohammadi; Iran | Mihail Sava; Moldova |
| 70 kg | Khetag Tsabolov; Russia | Yakup Gör; Turkey | Bekzod Abdurakhmonov; Uzbekistan |
| 70 kg | Khetag Tsabolov; Russia | Yakup Gör; Turkey | Ali Shabanau; Belarus |
| 74 kg | Denis Tsargush; Russia | Sosuke Takatani; Japan | Jordan Burroughs; United States |
| 74 kg | Denis Tsargush; Russia | Sosuke Takatani; Japan | Liván López; Cuba |
| 86 kg | Abdulrashid Sadulaev; Russia | Reineris Salas; Cuba | Selim Yaşar; Turkey |
| 86 kg | Abdulrashid Sadulaev; Russia | Reineris Salas; Cuba | Mohammad Hossein Mohammadian; Iran |
| 97 kg | Abdusalam Gadisov; Russia | Khetag Gazyumov; Azerbaijan | Javier Cortina; Cuba |
| 97 kg | Abdusalam Gadisov; Russia | Khetag Gazyumov; Azerbaijan | Valeriy Andriytsev; Ukraine |
| 125 kg | Taha Akgül; Turkey | Komeil Ghasemi; Iran | Khadzhimurat Gatsalov; Russia |
| 125 kg | Taha Akgül; Turkey | Komeil Ghasemi; Iran | Tervel Dlagnev; United States |

=== Men's Greco-Roman ===
| Event | Gold | Silver | Bronze |
|---|---|---|---|
| 59 kg | Hamid Sourian; Iran | Mingiyan Semenov; Russia | Stig-André Berge; Norway |
| 59 kg | Hamid Sourian; Iran | Mingiyan Semenov; Russia | Elmurat Tasmuradov; Uzbekistan |
| 66 kg | Davor Štefanek; Serbia | Omid Norouzi; Iran | Tamás Lőrincz; Hungary |
| 66 kg | Davor Štefanek; Serbia | Omid Norouzi; Iran | Edgaras Venckaitis; Lithuania |
| 71 kg | Chingiz Labazanov; Russia | Yunus Özel; Turkey | Afshin Biabangard; Iran |
| 71 kg | Chingiz Labazanov; Russia | Yunus Özel; Turkey | Rasul Chunayev; Azerbaijan |
| 75 kg | Arsen Julfalakyan; Armenia | Neven Žugaj; Croatia | Andy Bisek; United States |
| 75 kg | Arsen Julfalakyan; Armenia | Neven Žugaj; Croatia | Elvin Mursaliyev; Azerbaijan |
| 80 kg | Péter Bácsi; Hungary | Evgeny Saleev; Russia | Selçuk Çebi; Turkey |
| 80 kg | Péter Bácsi; Hungary | Evgeny Saleev; Russia | Jim Pettersson; Sweden |
| 85 kg | Mélonin Noumonvi; France | Saman Tahmasebi; Azerbaijan | Zhan Beleniuk; Ukraine |
| 85 kg | Mélonin Noumonvi; France | Saman Tahmasebi; Azerbaijan | Viktor Lőrincz; Hungary |
| 98 kg | Artur Aleksanyan; Armenia | Oliver Hassler; Germany | Ghasem Rezaei; Iran |
| 98 kg | Artur Aleksanyan; Armenia | Oliver Hassler; Germany | Cenk İldem; Turkey |
| 130 kg | Mijaín López; Cuba | Rıza Kayaalp; Turkey | Heiki Nabi; Estonia |
| 130 kg | Mijaín López; Cuba | Rıza Kayaalp; Turkey | Bilyal Makhov; Russia |

=== Women's freestyle ===
| Event | Gold | Silver | Bronze |
|---|---|---|---|
| 48 kg | Eri Tosaka; Japan | Iwona Matkowska; Poland | Mariya Stadnik; Azerbaijan |
| 48 kg | Eri Tosaka; Japan | Iwona Matkowska; Poland | Kim Hyon-gyong; North Korea |
| 53 kg | Saori Yoshida; Japan | Sofia Mattsson; Sweden | Jillian Gallays; Canada |
| 53 kg | Saori Yoshida; Japan | Sofia Mattsson; Sweden | Jong Myong-suk; North Korea |
| 55 kg | Chiho Hamada; Japan | Irina Ologonova; Russia | Helen Maroulis; United States |
| 55 kg | Chiho Hamada; Japan | Irina Ologonova; Russia | Iryna Khariv; Ukraine |
| 58 kg | Kaori Icho; Japan | Valeria Koblova; Russia | Anastasiya Huchok; Belarus |
| 58 kg | Kaori Icho; Japan | Valeria Koblova; Russia | Elif Jale Yeşilırmak; Turkey |
| 60 kg | Sükheegiin Tserenchimed; Mongolia | Yuliya Ratkevich; Azerbaijan | Natalia Golts; Russia |
| 60 kg | Sükheegiin Tserenchimed; Mongolia | Yuliya Ratkevich; Azerbaijan | Taybe Yusein; Bulgaria |
| 63 kg | Yuliya Tkach; Ukraine | Elena Pirozhkova; United States | Valeria Lazinskaya; Russia |
| 63 kg | Yuliya Tkach; Ukraine | Elena Pirozhkova; United States | Anastasija Grigorjeva; Latvia |
| 69 kg | Aline Focken; Germany | Sara Dosho; Japan | Laura Skujiņa; Latvia |
| 69 kg | Aline Focken; Germany | Sara Dosho; Japan | Natalia Vorobieva; Russia |
| 75 kg | Adeline Gray; United States | Aline Ferreira; Brazil | Ochirbatyn Burmaa; Mongolia |
| 75 kg | Adeline Gray; United States | Aline Ferreira; Brazil | Zhou Qian; China |

== Participating nations ==
692 competitors from 81 nations participated.

- Albania (2)
- American Samoa (2)
- Argentina (3)
- Armenia (14)
- Austria (8)
- Azerbaijan (22)
- Belarus (23)
- Brazil (5)
- Bulgaria (18)
- Cameroon (1)
- Canada (14)
- Chile (1)
- China (23)
- Colombia (5)
- Croatia (5)
- Cuba (7)
- Czech Republic (7)
- Denmark (2)
- Ecuador (5)
- Egypt (8)
- El Salvador (1)
- Estonia (3)
- Finland (6)
- France (9)
- Georgia (16)
- Germany (18)
- Great Britain (1)
- Greece (10)
- Guam (1)
- Guatemala (1)
- Guinea-Bissau (3)
- Hungary (16)
- India (24)
- Indonesia (3)
- Iran (16)
- Ireland (1)
- Israel (4)
- Italy (8)
- Ivory Coast (1)
- Japan (24)
- Kazakhstan (24)
- Kyrgyzstan (12)
- Latvia (7)
- Lithuania (5)
- Macedonia (3)
- Madagascar (1)
- Mauritius (1)
- Mexico (13)
- Moldova (14)
- Monaco (1)
- Mongolia (16)
- Morocco (1)
- Namibia (1)
- Netherlands (1)
- Nicaragua (1)
- North Korea (5)
- Norway (4)
- Palau (1)
- Poland (17)
- Portugal (2)
- Puerto Rico (3)
- Qatar (1)
- Romania (13)
- Russia (24)
- Senegal (3)
- Serbia (6)
- Slovakia (7)
- Slovenia (1)
- South Africa (1)
- South Korea (19)
- Spain (8)
- Sweden (12)
- Switzerland (3)
- Tajikistan (7)
- Tunisia (2)
- Turkey (21)
- Turkmenistan (9)
- Ukraine (24)
- United States (24)
- Uzbekistan (24)
- Venezuela (9)
