= Furkan Bayrak =

Turkish Greco-Roman wrestler

Personal information
- Born: November 19, 1996 (age 29) Samsun, Turkey

Sport
- Country: Turkey
- Sport: Amateur wrestling
- Greco-Roman: 77 kg
- Event: Greco-Roman
- Team: Ankara ASKI
Medal record
Men's Greco-Roman wrestling
Representing Turkey
Islamic Solidarity Games
| Silver medal – second place | 2017 Baku | 75 kg |
| Bronze medal – third place | 2021 Konya | 77 kg |
Vehbi Emre & Hamit Kaplan Tournament
| Gold medal – first place | 2021 Istanbul | 77 kg |
| Bronze medal – third place | 2022 Istanbul | 77 kg |
| Bronze medal – third place | 2019 Istanbul | 77 kg |
World Juniors Championships
| Gold medal – first place | 2014 Zagreb | 74 kg |
European Juniors Championships
| Silver medal – second place | 2015 Istanbul | 74 kg |
| Bronze medal – third place | 2014 Warsaw | 74 kg |
World University Championship
| Bronze medal – third place | 2016 Çorum | 75 kg |

Furkan Bayrak (born November 19, 1995) competing in the 77 kg division of Greco-Roman wrestling. He is a member of the Ankara ASKI Spor Club.

== Career ==
Furkan Bayrak won a gold medal at the 2014 FILA Junior World Wrestling Championship held in Croatia's capital, Zagreb.

In 2017, Bayrak captured the silver medal at the Islamic Solidarity Games in Azerbaijan.

In 2022, he won one of the bronze medals in the men's Greco-Roman 77 kg event at the 2021 Islamic Solidarity Games held in Konya, Turkey.
