= Rustam Totrov =

Russian Greco-Roman wrestler

Personal information
- Born: 15 July 1984 (age 42) Vladikavkaz, North Ossetia–Alania, Russian SFSR, Soviet Union
- Height: 1.80 m (5 ft 11 in)
- Weight: 96 kg (212 lb)

Sport
- Sport: Wrestling
- Event: Greco-Roman
- Club: Wrestling Club Tyumen
- Coached by: Vladimir Urymagov; Sergey Vorobov; Vakhtan Gogloev
Medal record
Representing Russia
Men's Greco-Roman wrestling
Olympic Games
Silver medal – second place	2012 London	96 kg
World Championships
Bronze medal – third place	2011 Istanbul	96 kg
World Cup
Bronze medal – third place	2014 Tehran	98 kg

Rustam Stanislavovich Totrov (Russian: Рустам Станиславович Тотров; born 15 July 1984) is a Russian Greco-Roman wrestler. He won the silver medal at the 2012 Summer Olympics in the men's Greco-Roman 96 kg category.
