= Rasul Chunayev =

Azerbaijani Greco-Roman wrestler

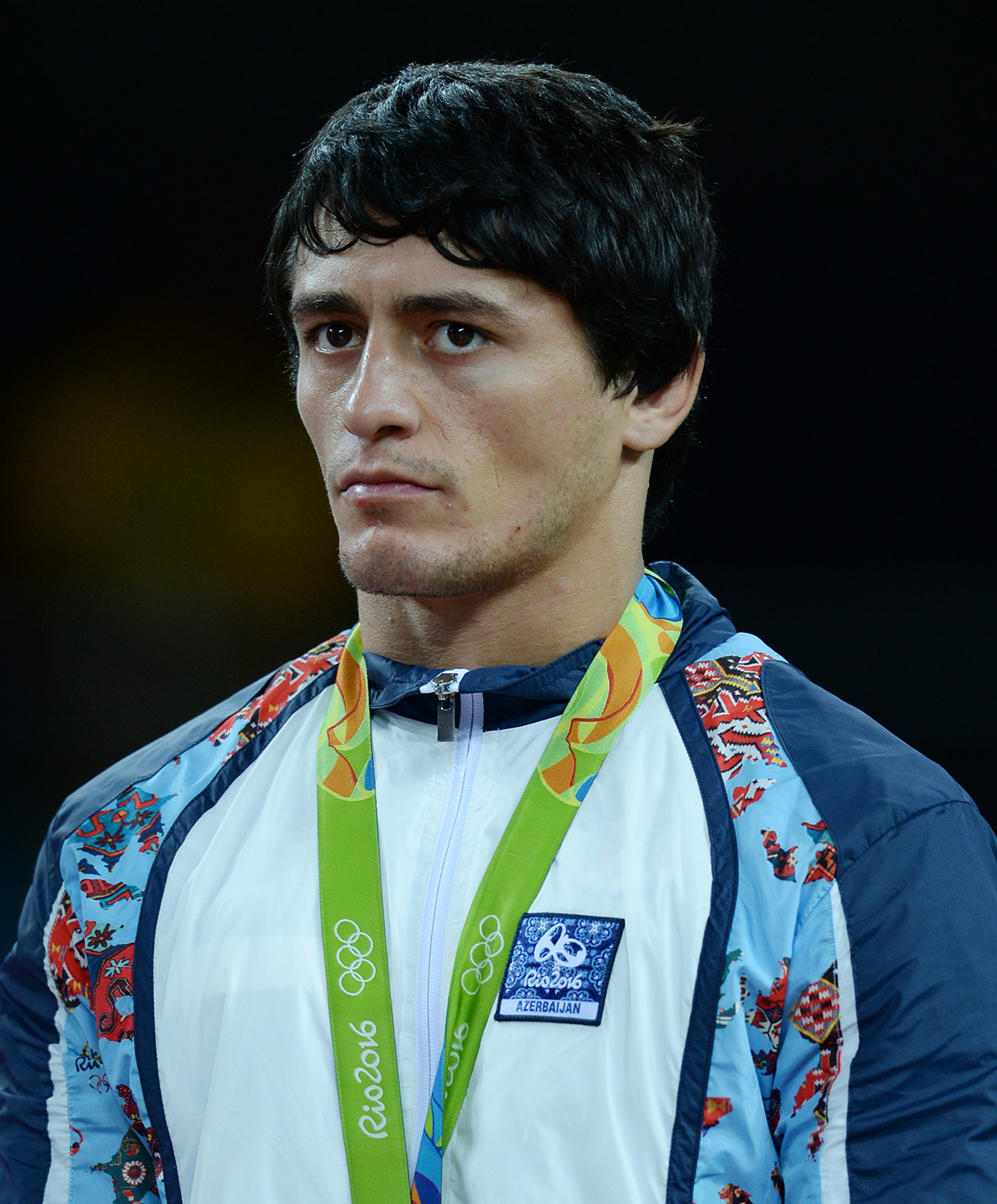

Medal record

Men's Greco-Roman

Representing Azerbaijan

Olympic Games
Bronze medal – third place	2016 Rio de Janeiro	66 kg

World Championships
Bronze medal – third place	2014 Tashkent	71 kg
Gold medal – first place	2015 Las Vegas	71 kg
Bronze medal – third place	2018 Budapest	72 kg

European Games
Gold medal – first place	2015 Baku	71 kg

European Championship
Silver medal – second place	2018 Kaspiysk	72 kg
Silver medal – second place	2014 Vantaa	71 kg

Summer Universiade
Gold medal – first place	2013 Kazan	66 kg

Islamic Solidarity Games
Bronze medal – third place	2017 Baku	66 kg

World Cup
Gold medal – first place	2015 Tehran	Team

Rasul Abakar oghlu Chunayev (Azerbaijani: Rəsul Çunayev) is an Azerbaijani Greco-Roman wrestler. He was born 7 January 1991 in Yeni Şərif, Balakən, Azerbaijan, to Avar parents. He is a world champion and European championship silver medalist in men's Greco-Roman wrestling.

== Career ==
In 2015, he won gold medal at 2015 European Games and became the first athlete to win gold while being on active duty for Azerbaijani Armed Forces.

== Personal life ==
Chunayev loves dancing. His character is frequently described as laid-back and relaxed. His most notable celebration came after Chunayev defeated Russian wrestler Islambek Albiev at the 2013 Summer Universiade, when he performed the Lezginka, a traditional dance of the Caucasus, on the mat. He also gave a military salute as a sign of respect to the Azerbaijani families of victims in Karabakh after defeating Armenian wrestler Varsham Boranyan during 2014 World Wrestling Championships in Tashkent.
