= Yury Denisov =

Russian amateur wrestler

Personal information
- Nationality: Russian
- Weight: 72 kg (159 lb)

Sport
- Style: Greco-Roman

Yury Denisov (Russian: Юрий Александрович Денисов, also spelt as Yuri Denisov) is a Russian wrestler born in 1988.

== Major events ==
Year	Event	Result
2013	World Combat Games	(gold) Gold
2015	European Games – Men's Greco-Roman 71 kg	Did not advance
2015	Russian National Greco-Roman Wrestling Championships	(gold) Gold
