= Miskinli, Gadabay =

Miskinli
- Municipality
- Location within Azerbaijan
- Coordinates: 40°30′07″N 45°45′55″E
- Country: Azerbaijan
- Rayon: Gadabay

Population
  - Total: 2,613
- Time zone: UTC+4 (AZT)
  - Summer (DST): UTC+5 (AZT)

Miskinli (known as Rüstəm Əliyev until 2011; also, Plankend and Rustavi) is a village and municipality in the Gadabay Rayon of Azerbaijan. It has a population of 2,613.
