= Evgeny Saleev =

Russian Greco-Roman wrestler

Evgeny Saleev Евгений Салеев
Personal information
- Full name: Evgeny Sergeyevich Saleev
- National team: Russia
- Born: 19 January 1989 (age 37) Saransk, Mordovia, Russia
- Height: 1.80 m (5 ft 11 in)
- Weight: 80 kg (180 lb)

Sport
- Sport: Wrestling
- Event: Greco-Roman
- Club: Vityaz Greco-Roman
- Coached by: Avyazov, Tarakanov
Medal record
Men's Greco-Roman wrestling
Representing Russia
World Championships
Silver medal – second place	2014 Tashkent	80 kg
World Cup
Silver medal – second place	2015 Tehran	85 kg
European Games
Gold medal – first place	2015 Baku	80 kg
Golden Grand Prix Ivan Poddubny
Bronze medal – third place	2013 Tyumen	74 kg
Military World Games
Silver medal – second place	2015 Mungyeong	80 kg
Bronze medal – third place	2019 Wuhan	87 kg

Evgeny Sergeyevich Saleev (Russian: Евгений Сергеевич Салеев; born 19 January 1989, in Mordovia) is a Russian former Greco-Roman wrestler. 2014 world runner-up. 2015 European Games champion.
