= Afshin Biabangard =

Iranian Greco-Roman wrestler

Personal information
- Full name: Afshin Biabangard
- Nationality: Iran
- Born: June 10, 1987 (age 39) Parsabad، Ardabil Province، Iran

Sport
- Country: Iran
- Sport: Wrestling
Medal record
Representing Iran
Men's Greco-Roman wrestling
World Championships
| Bronze medal – third place | 2014 Tashkent | 71 Kg |
Asian Games
| Bronze medal – third place | 2014 Incheon | 66 kg |
Asian Championships
| Gold medal – first place | 2016 Bangkok | 71 kg |
| Silver medal – second place | 2012 Gumi | 66 kg |
| Silver medal – second place | 2017 New Delhi | 71 kg |

Afshin Biabangard (Persian: افشین بیابانگرد, born 10 June 1987 in Parsabad, Ardabil Province, Iran) is an Iranian wrestler, bronze medalist of the world championships.

In 2006, won the bronze medal at the Asian championship among juniors. In 2012 he won the silver medal in the Asian Championship. In 2014 won the bronze medal at the World Cup and the Asian Games.
