= Zakarias Tallroth =

Swedish wrestler

Medal record

Representing Sweden

Men's Greco-Roman wrestling

World Wrestling Championships
Bronze medal – third place	2015 Las Vegas	71 kg

Zakarias Tallroth is a Swedish wrestler.

Tollroth was a bronze medalist at the 2015 World Wrestling Championships in Men's Greco-Roman 71 kg.

His father, Roger Tallroth was an Olympic silver medalist and European champion.
