= Yunus Özel =

Turkish Greco-Roman wrestler (born 1987)

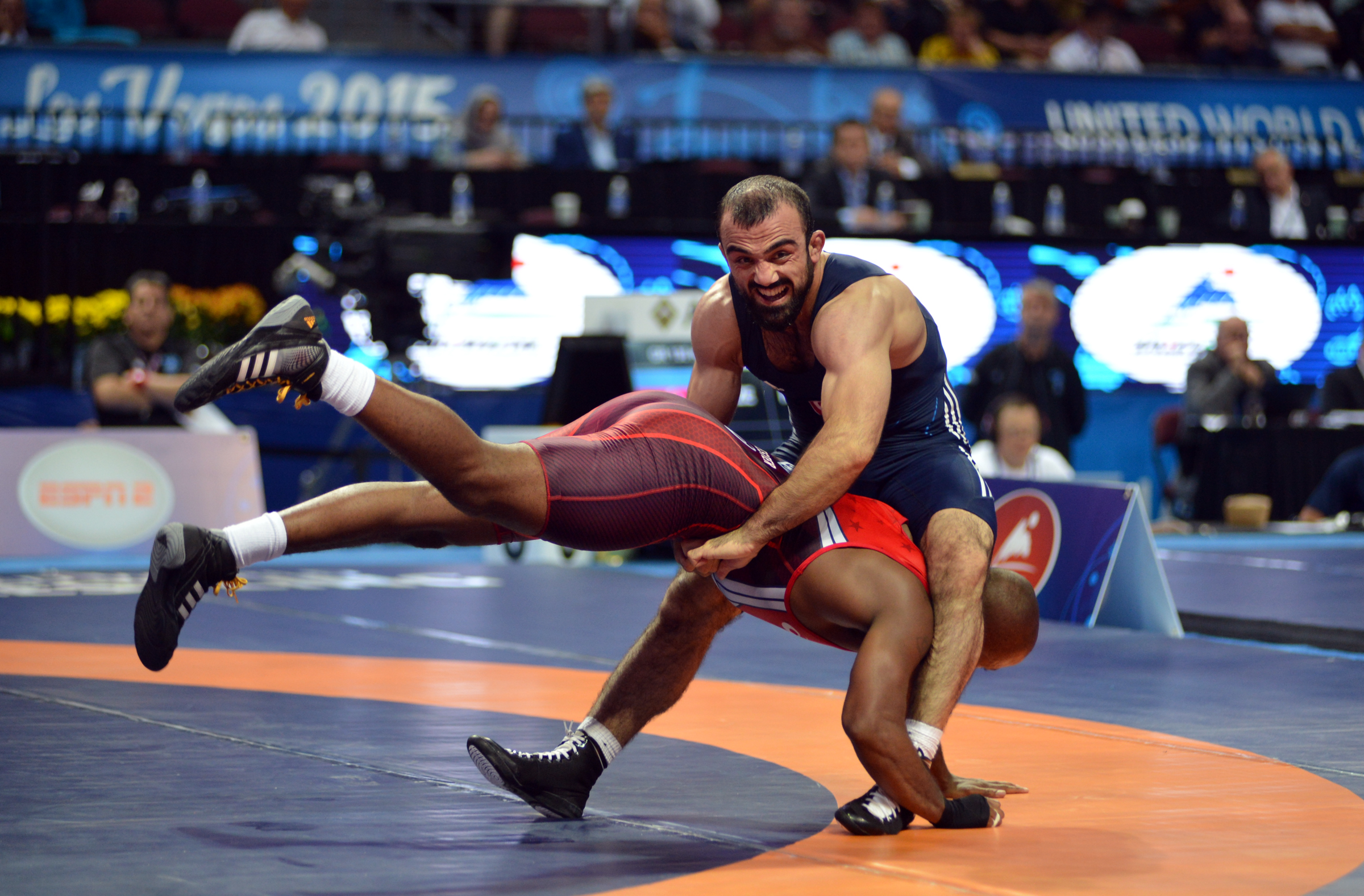
- Yunus Özel (in blue) vs Justin Lester

Personal information
- Born: August 18, 1987 (age 38) Sakarya, Turkey

Sport
- Country: Turkey
- Sport: Amateur wrestling
- Event: Greco-Roman
Medal record
Men's Greco-Roman wrestling
Representing Turkey
World Championships
Silver medal – second place	2014 Tashkent	71 kg

Yunus Özel (born 18 August 1987) is a Turkish Greco-Roman wrestler. He is a silver medalist at the 2014 World Wrestling Championships.
