= 2011 World Wrestling Championships – Men's Greco-Roman 84 kg =

Men's Greco-Roman 84 kg at the 2011 World Championships
- Venue: Sinan Erdem Dome
- Dates: 13 September 2011
- Competitors: 47 from 47 nations

Medalists
gold medal	Alim Selimau	Belarus
silver medal	Damian Janikowski	Poland
bronze medal	Nazmi Avluca	Turkey
bronze medal	Rami Hietaniemi	Finland

The men's Greco-Roman 84 kilograms is a competition featured at the 2011 World Wrestling Championships, and was held at the Sinan Erdem Dome in Istanbul, Turkey on 13 September 2011.

== Results ==
Legend

- F — Won by fall
- WO — Won by walkover

=== Finals ===
Semifinals				Final
Damian Janikowski (POL)	4	1
Nazmi Avluca (TUR)	0	0		Damian Janikowski (POL)	0	3	0
Alim Selimau (BLR)	1	0	1	Alim Selimau (BLR)	1	0	2
Rami Hietaniemi (FIN)	0	2	0

=== Top half ===
==== Section 1 ====
Round of 64

Round of 32
Viktor Lőrincz (HUN)	0	0
Laimutis Adomaitis (LTU)	1	3
Eerik Aps (EST)	2	3
Said Moulla (MAR)	0	0
Damian Janikowski (POL)	2	4
Pedro García (ESP)	0	0
Christoffer Ljungbeck (SWE)	0	0
Alan Khugaev (RUS)	1	1

Round of 16
Laimutis Adomaitis (LTU)	0	1	0
Eerik Aps (EST)	2	0	1
Damian Janikowski (POL)	0	1	1
Alan Khugaev (RUS)	3	0	0

Quarterfinals
Eerik Aps (EST)	0	0
Damian Janikowski (POL)	1	2

==== Section 2 ====
Round of 64

Round of 32
José Antonio Arias (DOM)	2	0
Vasyl Rachyba (UKR)	1	4^{F}
Nazmi Avluca (TUR)	0	1	1
Habibollah Akhlaghi (IRI)	1	0	0
Marcelo Gomes (BRA)	0	0
Lin Ming-hsuan (TPE)	1	7
Artur Omarov (CZE)	1	2
José Antonio Mendoza (MEX)	0	0

Round of 16
Vasyl Rachyba (UKR)	0	1	0
Nazmi Avluca (TUR)	1	0	2
Lin Ming-hsuan (TPE)	0	0
Artur Omarov (CZE)	2	2

Quarterfinals
Nazmi Avluca (TUR)	2	1
Artur Omarov (CZE)	1	0

=== Bottom half ===
==== Section 3 ====
Round of 64
Yorgen Cova (VEN)	0	0
Lee Se-yeol (KOR)	1	5
Nenad Žugaj (CRO)	2	1
Thomas Suppiger (SUI)	0	0
Vladimer Gegeshidze (GEO)	0	0
Mélonin Noumonvi (FRA)	1	1
Cheney Haight (USA)	0	1	0
Janarbek Kenjeev (KGZ)	1	0	1
Taichi Oka (JPN)	0	0
Alim Selimau (BLR)	1	1
Saman Tahmasebi (AZE)	1	4
Manoj Kumar (IND)	0	0
Haykel Achouri (TUN)	W	O
~~Ergys Mirukaj (ALB)~~

Round of 32
Hristo Marinov (BUL)	0	1	0
Lee Se-yeol (KOR)	1	0	2
Nenad Žugaj (CRO)	0	1	1
Mélonin Noumonvi (FRA)	1	0	0
Janarbek Kenjeev (KGZ)	0	0
Alim Selimau (BLR)	2	2
Saman Tahmasebi (AZE)	3	2
Haykel Achouri (TUN)	0	0

Round of 16
Lee Se-yeol (KOR)	0	2	0
Nenad Žugaj (CRO)	1	0	2
Alim Selimau (BLR)	2	2
Saman Tahmasebi (AZE)	0	0

Quarterfinals
Nenad Žugaj (CRO)	0	0
Alim Selimau (BLR)	1	1

==== Section 4 ====
Round of 64
Marián Mihálik (SVK)	4	1
Rustam Sultonov (UZB)	0	0
Cristian Mosquera (COL)	0	0
Theodoros Tounousidis (GRE)	4	1
Andrea Minguzzi (ITA)	0	1	1
Jan Fischer (GER)	1	1	0
Duan Ning (CHN)	0	1	1
Ylýas Esenow (TKM)	1	0	0
Nezar Oudeh (SYR)	0	0
Petar Balo (SRB)	1	2
Rami Hietaniemi (FIN)	2	2
Iurie Malai (MDA)	0	0
Artur Shahinyan (ARM)	0	1
Amer Hrustanović (AUT)	1	3
Zhanarbek Kabdolov (KAZ)	0	0
Pablo Shorey (CUB)	1	1

Round of 32
Marián Mihálik (SVK)	1	0	2
Theodoros Tounousidis (GRE)	0	2	1
Andrea Minguzzi (ITA)	1	1
Duan Ning (CHN)	0	0
Petar Balo (SRB)	0	0
Rami Hietaniemi (FIN)	1	3
Amer Hrustanović (AUT)	3	0	2
Pablo Shorey (CUB)	1	4	0

Round of 16
Marián Mihálik (SVK)	1	0
Andrea Minguzzi (ITA)	1	2
Rami Hietaniemi (FIN)	4	1
Amer Hrustanović (AUT)	0	0

Quarterfinals
Andrea Minguzzi (ITA)	0	0
Rami Hietaniemi (FIN)	1	2

=== Repechage ===
Repechage round 1
Taichi Oka (JPN)	2	0	0
Janarbek Kenjeev (KGZ)	0	2	2

Repechage round 2
Pedro García (ESP)	0	0
Alan Khugaev (RUS)	2	1
Janarbek Kenjeev (KGZ)	0	3	0
Saman Tahmasebi (AZE)	1	0	2

Repechage round 3
Alan Khugaev (RUS)	1	1
Eerik Aps (EST)	0	0
Saman Tahmasebi (AZE)	2	0	2
Nenad Žugaj (CRO)	0	1	0

Bronze medals
Alan Khugaev (RUS)	0	1	0
Nazmi Avluca (TUR)	1	0	2
Saman Tahmasebi (AZE)
Rami Hietaniemi (FIN)	W	O
