= 2010 World Wrestling Championships – Men's Greco-Roman 84 kg =

Men's Greco-Roman 84 kg at the 2010 World Championships
- Venue: Olympic Stadium
- Dates: 7 September 2010
- Competitors: 40 from 40 nations

Medalists
gold medal	Hristo Marinov	Bulgaria
silver medal	Pablo Shorey	Cuba
bronze medal	Aleksey Mishin	Russia
bronze medal	Nenad Žugaj	Croatia

The men's Greco-Roman 84 kilograms is a competition featured at the 2010 World Wrestling Championships, and was held at the Olympic Stadium in Moscow, Russia on 7 September.

== Results ==
Legend

- F — Won by fall
- R — Retired
- WO — Won by walkover

=== Finals ===
Semifinals				Final
Hristo Marinov (BUL)	2	0	2
Damian Janikowski (POL)	0	2	0	Hristo Marinov (BUL)	2	1
Nenad Žugaj (CRO)	0	1	0	Pablo Shorey (CUB)	0	0
Pablo Shorey (CUB)	1	0	2

=== Top half ===
==== Section 1 ====
Round of 64

Round of 32
Haykel Achouri (TUN)	0	0
Aleksey Mishin (RUS)	1	1
Taleb Nematpour (IRI)
Denis Nikolaev (ISR)	W	O
Duan Ning (CHN)	0	0
Amer Hrustanović (AUT)	1	3
Hristo Marinov (BUL)	0	3	2
Artur Omarov (CZE)	1	0	0

Round of 16
Aleksey Mishin (RUS)	2	1
Denis Nikolaev (ISR)	0	0
Amer Hrustanović (AUT)	0	0
Hristo Marinov (BUL)	1	2

Quarterfinals
Aleksey Mishin (RUS)	0	4	0
Hristo Marinov (BUL)	1	3	1

==== Section 2 ====
Round of 64

Round of 32
Mélonin Noumonvi (FRA)	0	1	0
Theodoros Tounousidis (GRE)	1	0	1
Jake Clark (USA)	0	7	3
Adrian Mocanu (MDA)	1	0	0
Aliaksandr Hrabovik (BLR)	1	1	0
Damian Janikowski (POL)	3	0	1
Dejan Šernek (SLO)	0	1
Saman Tahmasebi (AZE)	1	5

Round of 16
Theodoros Tounousidis (GRE)	0	0
Jake Clark (USA)	2	2
Damian Janikowski (POL)	2	1
Saman Tahmasebi (AZE)	0	0

Quarterfinals
Jake Clark (USA)	0	0
Damian Janikowski (POL)	1	2

=== Bottom half ===
==== Section 3 ====
Round of 64

Round of 32
Jan Fischer (GER)	3	1
Christoffer Ljungbeck (SWE)	0	0
Laimutis Adomaitis (LTU)	3	1
Cristian Mosquera (COL)	0	0
Eerik Aps (EST)	0	2	1
Jakhongir Muminov (UZB)	1	0	6
Zsolt Dajka (HUN)	0	0
Nenad Žugaj (CRO)	1	1

Round of 16
Jan Fischer (GER)	0	1	0
Laimutis Adomaitis (LTU)	1	0	2
Jakhongir Muminov (UZB)	2	0	0
Nenad Žugaj (CRO)	0	1	1

Quarterfinals
Laimutis Adomaitis (LTU)	0	1	1
Nenad Žugaj (CRO)	1	0	1

==== Section 4 ====
Round of 64
Domingo Estrada (NCA)	0	0
Ylýas Esenow (TKM)	6	2
Rami Hietaniemi (FIN)	0	1
Vasyl Rachyba (UKR)	1	1
Nazmi Avluca (TUR)	0	1	4^{F}
Lee Se-yeol (KOR)	1	0	0
Ulukbek Karacholokov (KGZ)	0	0^{R}
Petar Balo (SRB)	1	1
Eddy Bartolozzi (VEN)	1	0
Pablo Shorey (CUB)	3	2
Lin Ming-hsuan (TPE)	0	0
Alkhazur Ozdiyev (KAZ)	1	5
Denis Forov (ARM)	3	1
Vladimer Gegeshidze (GEO)	0	4^{F}
Norikatsu Saikawa (JPN)	3	1
Marián Mihálik (SVK)	0	0

Round of 32
Ylýas Esenow (TKM)	0	0
Vasyl Rachyba (UKR)	1	4^{F}
Nazmi Avluca (TUR)	3	1
Petar Balo (SRB)	0	0
Pablo Shorey (CUB)	3	1
Alkhazur Ozdiyev (KAZ)	1	0
Vladimer Gegeshidze (GEO)	2	2
Norikatsu Saikawa (JPN)	0	0

Round of 16
Vasyl Rachyba (UKR)	0	0
Nazmi Avluca (TUR)	2	1
Pablo Shorey (CUB)	1	0	1
Vladimer Gegeshidze (GEO)	0	1	0

Quarterfinals
Nazmi Avluca (TUR)	2	0	0
Pablo Shorey (CUB)	1	4	2^{F}

=== Repechage ===
Repechage round 1
Eddy Bartolozzi (VEN)	0	0
Alkhazur Ozdiyev (KAZ)	1	2^{F}

Repechage round 2
Artur Omarov (CZE)	0	1
Amer Hrustanović (AUT)	1	3
Alkhazur Ozdiyev (KAZ)	3	1
Vladimer Gegeshidze (GEO)	0	0

Repechage round 3
Amer Hrustanović (AUT)	0	0
Aleksey Mishin (RUS)	1	1
Alkhazur Ozdiyev (KAZ)	0	0
Nazmi Avluca (TUR)	1	2

Bronze medals
Aleksey Mishin (RUS)	2	1
Damian Janikowski (POL)	0	0
Nazmi Avluca (TUR)	0	0
Nenad Žugaj (CRO)	1	1
