= Kazakhstan at the 2012 Summer Olympics =

- IOC code: KAZ
- NOC: National Olympic Committee of the Republic of Kazakhstan
- Website: www.olympic.kz (in Kazakh, Russian, and English)

in London
- Competitors: 115 in 16 sports
- Flag bearers: Nurmakhan Tinaliyev (opening); Serik Sapiyev (closing)
- Medals Ranked 24th: Gold 3 Silver 2 Bronze 6 Total 11

Summer Olympics appearances (overview)
- 1996; 2000; 2004; 2008; 2012; 2016; 2020; 2024; 2028

Other related appearances
- Russian Empire (1900–1912); Soviet Union (1952–1988); Unified Team (1992)

Kazakhstan competed at the 2012 Summer Olympics in London, from 27 July to 12 August 2012. This was the nation's fifth appearance at the Summer Olympics in the post-Soviet era.

National Olympic Committee of the Republic of Kazakhstan sent a total of 115 athletes to the Games, 74 men and 41 women, to compete in 16 sports. The nation's team size was roughly 15 athletes smaller compared to the team sent to Beijing, and had the second largest share of men in its Summer Olympic history. Men's water polo was the only team-based sport in which Kazakhstan was represented in these Olympic Games. Among the sports played by the athletes, Kazakhstan marked its official Olympic debut in tennis.

Kazakhstan left London with a total of 13 medals (7 gold, 1 silver, and 5 bronze), finishing twelfth in the overall medal standings. This was the nation's most successful Olympics with the most gold medals, surpassing its previous records obtained in Atlanta and in Sydney where the nation had won three golds. Four of these medals were awarded to the athletes in weightlifting, which is Kazakhstan's most powerful Olympic sport along with boxing. Among the nation's medalists were weightlifter Ilya Ilin, who managed to defend his Olympic title from Beijing, and triple jumper Olga Rypakova, who became the second Kazakh track and field athlete to win the gold after 12 years. Professional cyclist Alexander Vinokourov, who competed at his fourth Olympics since 1996, won Kazakhstan's first ever gold medal in the men's road race. In 2016, following a series of positive drugs tests found during retests of 2012 samples, Kazakhstani athletes were stripped of a series of medals, including all four golds in weightlifting.

== Medalists ==
Medal	Name	Sport	Event	Date
Gold	Alexander Vinokourov	Cycling	Men's road race	28 July
Gold	Olga Rypakova	Athletics	Women's triple jump	5 August
Gold	Serik Sapiyev	Boxing	Men's welterweight	12 August
Silver	Adilbek Niyazymbetov	Boxing	Men's light heavyweight	12 August
Silver	Anna Nurmukhambetova	Weightlifting	Women's 69 kg	1 August
Bronze	Daniyal Gadzhiyev	Wrestling	Men's Greco-Roman 84 kg	6 August
Bronze	Marina Volnova	Boxing	Women's middleweight	8 August
Bronze	Guzel Manyurova	Wrestling	Women's freestyle 72 kg	9 August
Bronze	Ivan Dychko	Boxing	Men's super heavyweight	10 August
Bronze	Akzhurek Tanatarov	Wrestling	Men's freestyle 66 kg	12 August
Bronze	Daulet Shabanbay	Wrestling	Men's freestyle 120 kg	11 August

Medals by sport
Sport	1st place, gold medalist(s)	2nd place, silver medalist(s)	3rd place, bronze medalist(s)	Total
Boxing	1	1	2	4
Cycling	1	0	0	1
Athletics	1	0	0	1
Wrestling	0	0	4	4
Weightlifting	0	1	0	1
Total	3	2	6	11

Medals by date
Day	Date	1st place, gold medalist(s)	2nd place, silver medalist(s)	3rd place, bronze medalist(s)	Total
Day 1	28 July	1	0	0	1
Day 2	29 July	0	0	0	1
Day 3	30 July	0	0	0	0
Day 4	31 July	0	0	0	1
Day 5	1 August	0	1	0	1
Day 6	2 August	0	0	0	0
Day 7	3 August	0	0	0	1
Day 8	4 August	0	0	0	1
Day 9	5 August	1	0	0	1
Day 10	6 August	0	0	1	1
Day 11	7 August	0	0	0	0
Day 12	8 August	0	0	1	1
Day 13	9 August	0	0	1	1
Day 14	10 August	0	0	1	1
Day 15	11 August	0	0	1	1
Day 16	12 August	1	1	1	3
Total		3	2	6	11

=== Disqualified medalists ===
Medal	Name	Sport	Event	Date
Gold	Zulfiya Chinshanlo	Weightlifting	Women's 53 kg	29 July
Gold	Maiya Maneza	Weightlifting	Women's 63 kg	31 July
Gold	Svetlana Podobedova	Weightlifting	Women's 75 kg	3 August
Gold	Ilya Ilyin	Weightlifting	Men's 94 kg	4 August

== Archery ==
Kazakhstan qualified two archers.

Athlete	Event	Ranking round		Round of 64	Round of 32	Round of 16	Quarterfinals	Semifinals	Final / BM	
Athlete	Event	Score	Seed	Opposition Score	Opposition Score	Opposition Score	Opposition Score	Opposition Score	Opposition Score	Rank
Denis Gankin	Men's individual	670	17	Kamaruddin (MAS) (48); W 6–4	van der Ven (NED) (16); L 1–7	Did not advance				
Anastassiya Bannova	Women's individual	614	54	Román (MEX) (11); L 2–6	Did not advance					

== Athletics ==
Kazakh athletes have so far achieved qualifying standards in the following athletics events (up to a maximum of 3 athletes in each event at the 'A' Standard, and 1 at the 'B' Standard):

Key

- Note–Ranks given for track events are within the athlete's heat only
- Q = Qualified for the next round
- q = Qualified for the next round as a fastest loser or, in field events, by position without achieving the qualifying target
- NR = National record
- N/A = Round not applicable for the event
- Bye = Athlete not required to compete in round

Men
Track & road events

Athlete	Event	Heat		Semifinal		Final	
Athlete	Event	Result	Rank	Result	Rank	Result	Rank
Vitaliy Anichkin	50 km walk	—N/a				4:14:09	49
Artem Kosinov	3000 m steeplechase	8:42.27	10	—N/a		Did not advance	
Viktor Leptikov	400 m hurdles	51.67	8	Did not advance			
Vyacheslav Muravyev	200 m	21.75	7	Did not advance			
Georgiy Sheiko	20 km walk	—N/a				1:23:52	35
Sergej Zaikov	400 m	47.12	7	Did not advance			

Field events

Athlete	Event	Qualification		Final	
Athlete	Event	Distance	Position	Distance	Position
Yevgeniy Ektov	Triple jump	16.31	19	Did not advance	
Nikita Filippov	Pole vault	5.35	=18	Did not advance	
Roman Valiyev	Triple jump	16.23	21	Did not advance	

Combined events – Decathlon

Athlete	Event	100 m	LJ	SP	HJ	400 m	110H	DT	PV	JT	1500 m	Final	Rank
Dmitry Karpov	Result	10.91	7.21	16.47	1.99	49.83	14.40	44.93	5.10	49.93	5:16.83	7926	18
Dmitry Karpov	Points	881	864	880	794	822	924	765	941	588	467	7926	18

Women
Track & road events

Athlete	Event	Heat		Quarterfinal		Semifinal		Final	
Athlete	Event	Result	Rank	Result	Rank	Result	Rank	Result	Rank
Tatyana Azarova	400 m hurdles	58.53	6	—N/a		Did not advance			
Olga Bludova	100 m	Bye		11.31	2 Q	11.39	8	Did not advance	
Nataliya Ivoninskaya	100 m hurdles	13.48	7	—N/a		Did not advance			
Ayman Kozhakhmetova	20 km walk	—N/a						1:35:00	42
Sholpan Kozhakhmetova	20 km walk	—N/a						DNF	
Marina Maslenko	400 m	53.66	6	—N/a		Did not advance			
Margarita Matsko	800 m	2:02.12	5 q	—N/a		1:59.20	3	Did not advance	
Anastassiya Pilipenko	100 m hurdles	13.77	5	—N/a		Did not advance			
Anastasiya Soprunova	100 m hurdles	13.40	4	—N/a		Did not advance			
Viktoriya Zyabkina	200 m	23.49	7	—N/a		Did not advance			

Field events

Athlete	Event	Qualification		Final	
Athlete	Event	Distance	Position	Distance	Position
Marina Aitova	High jump	NM	—	Did not advance	
Irina Ektova	Triple jump	13.39	31	Did not advance	
Alexandra Fisher	Shot put	16.16	29	Did not advance	
Olga Rypakova	Triple jump	14.79	1 Q	14.98	1st place, gold medalist(s)

Combined events – Heptathlon

Athlete	Event	100H	HJ	SP	200 m	LJ	JT	800 m	Final	Rank
Irina Karpova	Result	14.21	1.68	11.68	25.42	5.70	35.75	2:28.93	5319	32
Irina Karpova	Points	949	830	640	849	759	586	706	5319	32

== Boxing ==
Kazakhstan has qualified the following boxers.

Men

Athlete	Event	Round of 32	Round of 16	Quarterfinals	Semifinals	Final	
Athlete	Event	Opposition Result	Opposition Result	Opposition Result	Opposition Result	Opposition Result	Rank
Birzhan Zhakypov	Light flyweight	Beccu (FRA); W 18–17	Barriga (PHI); W 17–16	Zou S (CHN); L 10–13	Did not advance		
Ilyas Suleimenov	Flyweight	Ntuve (SWE); W 13–8	Selby (GBR); L 15–19	Did not advance			
Kanat Abutalipov	Bantamweight	Slamana (SYR); W 15–7	Nevin (IRL); L 10–15	Did not advance			
Gani Zhailauov	Lightweight	Ardee (THA); W 12–12	Bhagwan (IND); W 16–8	Toledo (CUB); L 11–19	Did not advance		
Daniyar Yeleussinov	Light welterweight	Herring (USA); W 19–9	Tolouti (IRI); W 19–10	Mangiacapre (ITA); L 12–16	Did not advance		
Serik Sapiyev	Welterweight	Bye	Suzuki (JPN); W 25–11	Maestre (VEN); W 20–9	Zamkovoy (RUS); W 18–12	Evans (GBR); W 17–9	1st place, gold medalist(s)
Danabek Suzhanov	Middleweight	Vijender (IND); L 10–14	Did not advance				
Adilbek Niyazymbetov	Light heavyweight	Bye	Góngora (ECU); W 13–5	Rouzbahani (IRI); W 13–10	Hvozdyk (UKR); W 13^{+}–13	Mekhontsev (RUS); L 15–15^{+}	2nd place, silver medalist(s)
Ivan Dychko	Super heavyweight	—N/a	Pfeifer (GER); W 14–4	Kean (CAN); W 20–6	Joshua (GBR); L 11–13	Did not advance	3rd place, bronze medalist(s)

Women

Athlete	Event	Round of 16	Quarterfinals	Semifinals	Final	
Athlete	Event	Opposition Result	Opposition Result	Opposition Result	Opposition Result	Rank
Saida Khassenova	Lightweight	Araújo (BRA); L 14–16	Did not advance			
Marina Volnova	Middleweight	Andiego (KEN); W 20–11	Marshall (GBR); W 16–12	Shields (USA); L 15–29	Did not advance	3rd place, bronze medalist(s)

== Canoeing ==
=== Slalom ===
Athlete	Event	Preliminary						Semifinal		Final	
Athlete	Event	Run 1	Rank	Run 2	Rank	Best	Rank	Time	Rank	Time	Rank
Rafail Vergoyazov	Men's C-1	125.49	15	225.23	17	125.49	17	Did not advance			

=== Sprint ===
Kazakhstan has qualified boats for the following events.

Athlete	Event	Heats		Semifinals		Final	
Athlete	Event	Time	Rank	Time	Rank	Time	Rank
Alexandr Dyadchuk	Men's C-1 200 m	43.204	3 Q	42.359	5 FB	45.283	14
Alexandr Dyadchuk	Men's C-1 1000 m	4:44.175	4 Q	4:56.724	8 FB	4:55.737	16
Yevgeniy Alexeyev; Alexey Dergunov	Men's K-2 200 m	34.254	6 FB	Bye		35.494	9
Yevgeniy Alexeyev; Alexey Dergunov	Men's K-2 1000 m	3:32.176	5 Q	3:17.788	4 FB	3:14.867	11
Natalya Sergeyeva	Women's K-1 200 m	43.257	5 Q	42.602	7	Did not advance	
Natalya Sergeyeva	Women's K-1 500 m	1:54.445	4 Q	1:53.888	4 FB	1:54.707	13

Qualification Legend: FA = Qualify to final (medal); FB = Qualify to final B (non-medal)

== Cycling ==
Kazakhstan has qualified cyclists for the following events.

=== Road ===
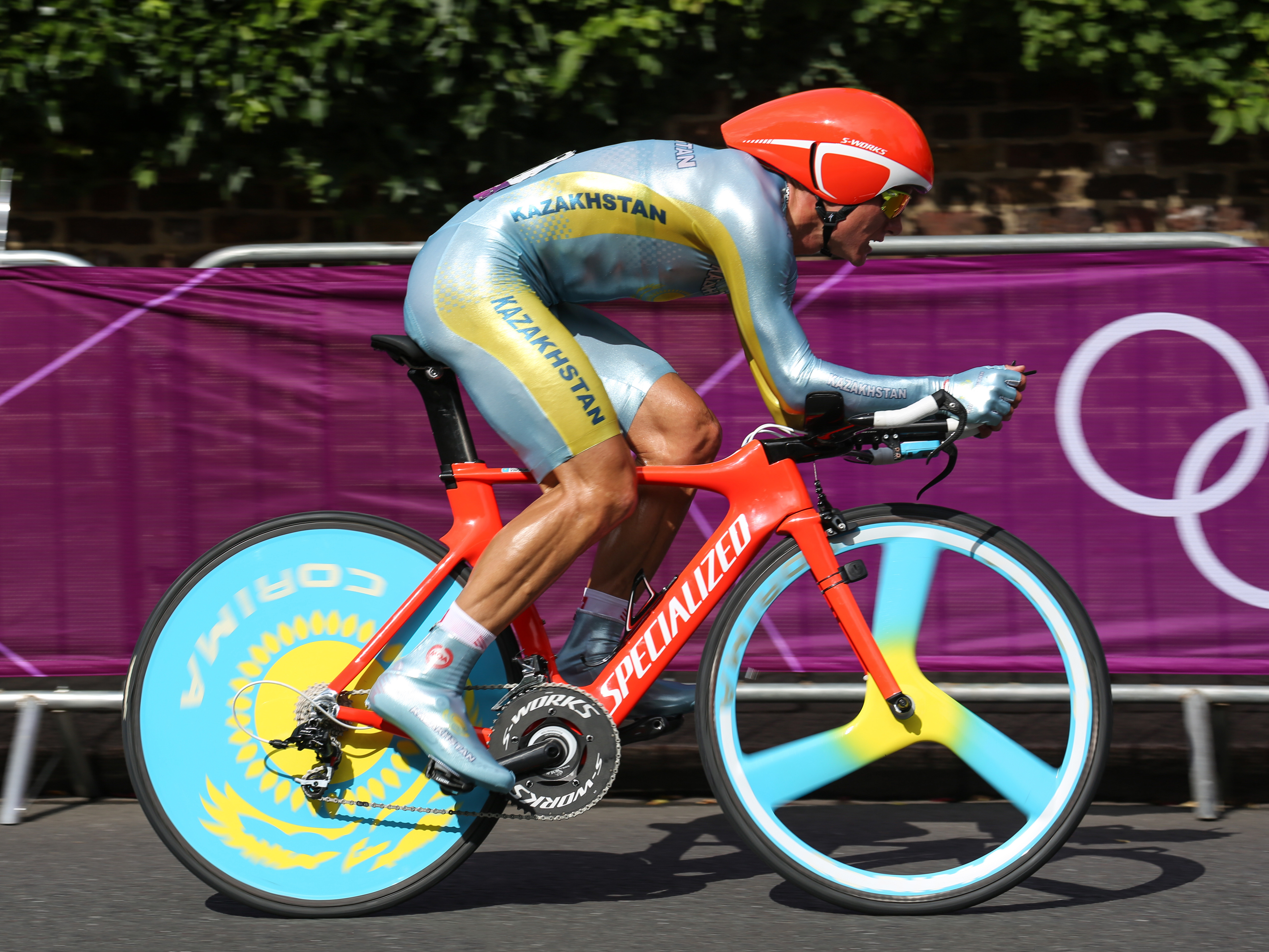
Alexander Vinokourov in men's road time trial.

Kazakhstan was given two spots in the men's road race, subsequently filled by Assan Bazayev and Alexander Vinokourov. While Bazayev was a newcomer, Vinokourov was not a stranger to the Olympics as he had competed in 1996, 2000, and 2004. Vinokourov was expected to place well, as he had won silver in the men's road race at the 2000 Summer Olympics in Sydney. The route for the race was 250 km (155.3 mi) in length and included nine climbs of the famous Box Hill. A large breakaway – which at its peak contained 32 riders – formed off the front of the peloton early on in the race. Alexander Vinokourov was not a part of the initial move, but he joined later on in the race. The peloton, led by the Great Britain Team, kept the breakaway relatively close for the latter 100 km (62.1 mi) of the race. However, as the race came to its close, the peloton could not close the gap to the large leading breakaway. It was clear that the breakaway would contain the eventual winner, and as the breakaway went under 10 km (6.2 mi) to go in the race, the riders began to attack. Vinokourov and Rigoberto Urán were the first two riders to mount a sizeable distance between the main breakaway and themselves. As Urán and Vinokourov worked together to stay away, the main breakaway didn't work collectively to pull back the two leading riders. With around 200 meters to go in the race, Urán swept across to the left side of the road and Vinokourov attacked. Vinokourov beat out Urán to win the race and ultimately the gold medal. Bazayev crossed the line in forty-third place while in the peloton.

Athlete	Event	Time	Rank
Assan Bazayev	Men's road race	5:46:37	43
Assan Bazayev	Men's time trial	56:40.77	31
Alexander Vinokourov	Men's road race	5:45:57	1st place, gold medalist(s)
Alexander Vinokourov	Men's time trial	55:37.05	23

== Fencing ==
Kazakhstan has qualified 3 fencers.

Men

Athlete	Event	Round of 64	Round of 32	Round of 16	Quarterfinal	Semifinal	Final / BM	
Athlete	Event	Opposition Score	Opposition Score	Opposition Score	Opposition Score	Opposition Score	Opposition Score	Rank
Dmitriy Alexanin	Individual épée	—N/a	Fernández (VEN); L 12–15	Did not advance				
Elmir Alimzhanov	Individual épée	—N/a	Nguyễn T N (VIE); W 15–5	Jung J-S (KOR); L 8–15	Did not advance			

Women

Athlete	Event	Round of 64	Round of 32	Round of 16	Quarterfinal	Semifinal	Final / BM	
Athlete	Event	Opposition Score	Opposition Score	Opposition Score	Opposition Score	Opposition Score	Opposition Score	Rank
Yuliya Zhivitsa	Individual sabre	—N/a	Gavrilova (RUS); L 7–15	Did not advance				

== Gymnastics ==
=== Artistic ===
Men

Athlete	Event	Qualification								Final							
Athlete	Event	Apparatus						Total	Rank	Apparatus						Total	Rank
Athlete	Event	F	PH	R	V	PB	HB	Total	Rank	F	PH	R	V	PB	HB	Total	Rank
Stepan Gorbachev	All-around	13.900	13.733	13.533	15.666	13.433	13.666	83.931	30	Did not advance							

Women

Athlete	Event	Qualification						Final					
Athlete	Event	Apparatus				Total	Rank	Apparatus				Total	Rank
Athlete	Event	F	V	UB	BB	Total	Rank	F	V	UB	BB	Total	Rank
Moldir Azimbay	All-around	11.933	12.800	10.700	11.566	46.999	58	Did not advance					

=== Rhythmic ===
Athlete	Event	Qualification						Final					
Athlete	Event	Hoop	Ball	Clubs	Ribbon	Total	Rank	Hoop	Ball	Clubs	Ribbon	Total	Rank
Anna Alyabyeva	Individual	27.200	26.575	25.250	27.400	106.425	15	Did not advance					

== Judo ==
Men

Athlete	Event	Round of 64	Round of 32	Round of 16	Quarterfinals	Semifinals	Repechage	Final / BM	
Athlete	Event	Opposition Result	Opposition Result	Opposition Result	Opposition Result	Opposition Result	Opposition Result	Opposition Result	Rank
Yerkebulan Kossayev	−60 kg	Bye	Pessoa (CAN); W 0001–0000	Davtyan (ARM); L 0000–0100	Did not advance				
Sergey Lim	−66 kg	Bye	Ivanov (BUL); W 0101–0001	Ebinuma (JPN); L 0001–0010	Did not advance				
Rinat Ibragimov	−73 kg	Bye	Wang K-C (KOR); L 0000–1001	Did not advance					
Islam Bozbayev	−81 kg	Vasylenko (UKR); W 1000–0001	Denanyoh (TOG); W 0200–0000	Bischof (GER); L 1011–0002	Did not advance				
Timur Bolat	−90 kg	—N/a	Mesbah (EGY); W 1002–0011	Nishiyama (JPN); L 0000–0010	Did not advance				
Maxim Rakov	−100 kg	—N/a	Gasimov (AZE); L 0000–0011	Did not advance					
Yerzhan Shynkeyev	+100 kg	—N/a	Jaballah (TUN); L 0001–0001 YUS	Did not advance					

Women

Athlete	Event	Round of 32	Round of 16	Quarterfinals	Semifinals	Repechage	Final / BM	
Athlete	Event	Opposition Result	Opposition Result	Opposition Result	Opposition Result	Opposition Result	Opposition Result	Rank
Aleksandra Podryadova	−48 kg	Bye	Munkhbat (MGL); L 0001–0010	Did not advance				
Gulzhan Issanova	+78 kg	Bye	Kim N-Y (KOR); W 0012^{+}–0012	Bryant (GBR); L 0011–0102	Did not advance	Altheman (BRA); L 0002–0111	Did not advance	7

== Modern pentathlon ==
Kazakhstan has qualified 2 men.

Athlete	Event	Fencing (épée one touch)			Swimming (200 m freestyle)			Riding (show jumping)			Combined: shooting/running (10 m air pistol)/(3000 m)			Total points	Final rank
Athlete	Event	Results	Rank	MP points	Time	Rank	MP points	Penalties	Rank	MP points	Time	Rank	MP Points	Total points	Final rank
Pavel Iliashenko	Men's	15–20	=25	760	2:06.62	26	1244	164	30	1036	10:49.80	17	2404	5432	29
Rustem Sabizkhuzin	Men's	19–16	10	856	2:13.21	34	1204	100	24	1100	10:49.57	16	2404	5564	21

== Rowing ==
Kazakhstan has qualified the following boats.

Men

Athlete	Event	Heats		Repechage		Quarterfinals		Semifinals		Final	
Athlete	Event	Time	Rank	Time	Rank	Time	Rank	Time	Rank	Time	Rank
Vladislav Yakovlev	Single sculls	7:16.34	5 R	7:22.00	5 SE/F	Bye		7:33.29	2 SE	7:36.14	28

Women

Athlete	Event	Heats		Repechage		Quarterfinals		Semifinals		Final	
Athlete	Event	Time	Rank	Time	Rank	Time	Rank	Time	Rank	Time	Rank
Svetlana Germanovich	Single sculls	8:01.94	5 R	7:53.63	3 FE	Bye				8:37.08	25

Qualification Legend: FA=Final A (medal); FB=Final B (non-medal); FC=Final C (non-medal); FD=Final D (non-medal); FE=Final E (non-medal); FF=Final F (non-medal); SA/B=Semifinals A/B; SC/D=Semifinals C/D; SE/F=Semifinals E/F; QF=Quarterfinals; R=Repechage

== Shooting ==
Kazakhstan has ensured a three quotas in shooting.

Men

Athlete	Event	Qualification		Final	
Athlete	Event	Points	Rank	Points	Rank
Vyacheslav Podlesnyy	50 m pistol	540	34	Did not advance	
Vyacheslav Podlesnyy	10 m air pistol	565	40	Did not advance	

Women

Athlete	Event	Qualification		Final	
Athlete	Event	Points	Rank	Points	Rank
Olga Dovgun	50 m rifle 3 positions	578	24	Did not advance	
Olga Dovgun	10 m air rifle	394	22	Did not advance	
Angelina Michshuk	Skeet	66	9	Did not advance	

== Swimming ==
Kazakh swimmers have so far achieved qualifying standards in the following events (up to a maximum of 2 swimmers in each event at the Olympic Qualifying Time (OQT), and potentially 1 at the Olympic Selection Time (OST)):

Men

Athlete	Event	Heat		Semifinal		Final	
Athlete	Event	Time	Rank	Time	Rank	Time	Rank
Yuriy Kudinov	10 km open water	—N/a				1:52:59.0	22
Vladislav Polyakov	100 m breaststroke	1:02.15	34	Did not advance			
Alexandr Tarabrin	100 m backstroke	55.55	38	Did not advance			
Alexandr Tarabrin	200 m backstroke	2:01.22	30	Did not advance			

Women

Athlete	Event	Heat		Semifinal		Final	
Athlete	Event	Time	Rank	Time	Rank	Time	Rank
Yekaterina Rudenko	100 m backstroke	1:03.64	38	Did not advance			

== Synchronized swimming ==
Kazakhstan has qualified 2 quota places in synchronized swimming.

Athlete	Event	Technical routine		Free routine (preliminary)			Free routine (final)		
Athlete	Event	Points	Rank	Points	Total (technical + free)	Rank	Points	Total (technical + free)	Rank
Anna Kulkina; Aigerim Zhexembinova	Duet	84.600	15	84.980	169.580	15	Did not advance		

== Taekwondo ==
Kazakhstan has qualified the following quota places.

Athlete	Event	Round of 16	Quarterfinals	Semifinals	Repechage	Bronze Medal	Final	
Athlete	Event	Opposition Result	Opposition Result	Opposition Result	Opposition Result	Opposition Result	Opposition Result	Rank
Nursultan Mamayev	Men's −58 kg	Bayoumi (EGY); L 0–1 SDP	Did not advance					
Gulnafis Aytmukhambetova	Women's −67 kg	Anić (SLO); L 11–15	Did not advance					
Feruza Yergeshova	Women's +67 kg	Rajher (SLO); L 16–17 SDP	Did not advance					

== Tennis ==
Athlete	Event	Round of 64	Round of 32	Round of 16	Quarterfinals	Semifinals	Final / BM	
Athlete	Event	Opposition Score	Opposition Score	Opposition Score	Opposition Score	Opposition Score	Opposition Score	Rank
Mikhail Kukushkin	Men's singles	Simon (FRA); L 4–6, 2–6	Did not advance					
Yaroslava Shvedova	Women's singles	Halep (ROU); W 6–4, 6–2	Lisicki (GER); L 6–4, 3–6, 5–7	Did not advance				
Galina Voskoboeva	Women's singles	Babos (HUN); L 4–6, 2–6	Did not advance					
Yaroslava Shvedova; Galina Voskoboeva	Women's doubles	—N/a	Dubois / Wozniak (CAN); W 6–2, 6–0	Kirilenko / Petrova (RUS); L 3–6, 2–6	Did not advance			

== Water polo ==
Kazakhstan has qualified a men's team

- Men's event – 1 team of 13 players

=== Men's tournament ===
Team roster

The following is the Kazakh roster in the men's water polo tournament of the 2012 Summer Olympics.

№	Name	Pos.	Height	Weight	Date of birth	2012 club
1	Nikolay Maximov	GK	1.90 m (6 ft 3 in)	95 kg (209 lb)	15 November 1972	(Kazakhstan) SK Astana
2	Sergey Gubarev	D	1.83 m (6 ft 0 in)	90 kg (198 lb)	30 October 1978	(Russia) Dynamo Moscow
3	Murat Shakenov	D	1.83 m (6 ft 0 in)	71 kg (157 lb)	23 September 1990	(Kazakhstan) SK Astana
4	Sergey Gorovoy	CB	1.92 m (6 ft 4 in)	105 kg (231 lb)	6 August 1975	(Kazakhstan) SK Astana
5	Alexey Panfili	CB	1.98 m (6 ft 6 in)	98 kg (216 lb)	5 January 1974	(Russia) Spartak Volgograd
6	Alexey Shmider	CB	1.83 m (6 ft 0 in)	80 kg (176 lb)	19 March 1990	(Kazakhstan) SK Astana
7	Vladimir Ushakov	D	1.95 m (6 ft 5 in)	94 kg (207 lb)	16 March 1982	(Russia) Dynamo Moscow
8	Rustam Ukumanov	D	1.92 m (6 ft 4 in)	86 kg (190 lb)	22 March 1986	(Kazakhstan) SK Astana
9	Yevgeniy Zhilyayev	CB	1.91 m (6 ft 3 in)	93 kg (205 lb)	13 July 1973	(Kazakhstan) SK Astana
10	Mikhail Ruday	CF	1.93 m (6 ft 4 in)	95 kg (209 lb)	4 May 1988	(Kazakhstan) SK Astana
11	Ravil Manafov	CF	1.94 m (6 ft 4 in)	98 kg (216 lb)	22 June 1988	(Kazakhstan) SK Astana
12	Nikita Kokorin	D	1.91 m (6 ft 3 in)	77 kg (170 lb)	22 July 1989	(Kazakhstan) SK Astana
13	Alexandr Shvedov	GK	1.97 m (6 ft 6 in)	85 kg (187 lb)	11 April 1973	(Kazakhstan) SK Astana

Head coach: Sergey Drozdov

Group play

Team	Pld	W	D	L	GF	GA	GD	Pts	Qualification
Croatia	5	5	0	0	50	29	+21	10	Quarterfinals
Italy	5	3	1	1	40	36	+4	7	Quarterfinals
Spain	5	3	0	2	52	42	+10	6	Quarterfinals
Australia	5	2	0	3	40	44	−4	4	Quarterfinals
Greece	5	1	1	3	41	43	−2	3	
Kazakhstan	5	0	0	5	24	53	−29	0	

29 July 2012; 11:20	Report	Kazakhstan	6–14	Spain	Water Polo Arena, London; Referees: Marijo Brguljan (MNE), Ulrich Spiegel (GER)
29 July 2012; 11:20	Report	Score by quarters: 2–4, 1–5, 1–3, 2–2			Water Polo Arena, London; Referees: Marijo Brguljan (MNE), Ulrich Spiegel (GER)
29 July 2012; 11:20	Report	Gubarev, Ushakov 2	Goals	Perrone 5	Water Polo Arena, London; Referees: Marijo Brguljan (MNE), Ulrich Spiegel (GER)

31 July 2012; 14:10	Report	Australia	7–4	Kazakhstan	Water Polo Arena, London; Referees: Adrian Alexandrescu (ROU), Ulrich Spiegel (GER)
31 July 2012; 14:10	Report	Score by quarters: 2–1, 2–0, 2–2, 1–1			Water Polo Arena, London; Referees: Adrian Alexandrescu (ROU), Ulrich Spiegel (GER)
31 July 2012; 14:10	Report	Howden 2	Goals	four players 1	Water Polo Arena, London; Referees: Adrian Alexandrescu (ROU), Ulrich Spiegel (GER)

2 August 2012; 11:20	Report	Kazakhstan	4–11	Greece	Water Polo Arena, London; Referees: Ulrich Spiegel (GER), Brian Littlejohn (GBR)
2 August 2012; 11:20	Report	Score by quarters: 1–2, 0–4, 1–3, 2–2			Water Polo Arena, London; Referees: Ulrich Spiegel (GER), Brian Littlejohn (GBR)
2 August 2012; 11:20	Report	Ukumanov 2	Goals	Fountoulis 5	Water Polo Arena, London; Referees: Ulrich Spiegel (GER), Brian Littlejohn (GBR)

4 August 2012; 15:30	Report	Italy	9–6	Kazakhstan	Water Polo Arena, London; Referees: Anton Bervoets (NED), Cory Williams (NZL)
4 August 2012; 15:30	Report	Score by quarters: 4–2, 4–2, 1–1, 0–1			Water Polo Arena, London; Referees: Anton Bervoets (NED), Cory Williams (NZL)
4 August 2012; 15:30	Report	four players 2	Goals	Shmider, Zhilyayev 2	Water Polo Arena, London; Referees: Anton Bervoets (NED), Cory Williams (NZL)

6 August 2012; 10:00	Report	Kazakhstan	4–12	Croatia	Water Polo Arena, London; Referees: German Moller (ARG), Brian Littlejohn (GBR)
6 August 2012; 10:00	Report	Score by quarters: 0–4, 1–1, 2–4, 1–3			Water Polo Arena, London; Referees: German Moller (ARG), Brian Littlejohn (GBR)
6 August 2012; 10:00	Report	Zhilyayev 2	Goals	Dobud 5	Water Polo Arena, London; Referees: German Moller (ARG), Brian Littlejohn (GBR)

== Weightlifting ==
Kazakhstan has qualified 10 weightlifters in the Olympics, 6 men and 4 women. The team later reduced to 8 athletes after two weightlifters Arli Chontei and Farkhad Kharki, both born in China, reportedly withdrew from the Games because of citizenship issues.

In 2016, all four Kazakh weightlifting gold medals were disqualified, and their medals and records stripped, following retests of 2012 samples returned positive doping results.

Men

Athlete	Event	Snatch		Clean & Jerk		Total	Rank
Athlete	Event	Result	Rank	Result	Rank	Total	Rank
Kirill Pavlov	−77 kg	147	10	175	9	322	9
Ilya Ilin	−94 kg	185	2	233	1	~~418~~	DQ
Almas Uteshov	−94 kg	175	8	220	7	395	7
Alexandr Zaichikov	−105 kg	155	15	205	8	360	12

Women

Athlete	Event	Snatch		Clean & Jerk		Total	Rank
Athlete	Event	Result	Rank	Result	Rank	Total	Rank
Zulfiya Chinshanlo	−53 kg	95	3	131	1	~~226~~	DQ
Maiya Maneza	−63 kg	110	2	135	1	~~245~~	DQ
Anna Nurmukhambetova	−69 kg	115	3	136	5	251	2nd place, silver medalist(s)
Svetlana Podobedova	−75 kg	130	2	161	1	~~291~~	DQ

== Wrestling ==
Kazakhstan has qualified the following quota places.

Key:

- VT – Victory by Fall.
- PP – Decision by Points – the loser with technical points.
- PO – Decision by Points – the loser without technical points.

Men's freestyle

Athlete	Event	Qualification	Round of 16	Quarterfinal	Semifinal	Repechage 1	Repechage 2	Final / BM	
Athlete	Event	Opposition Result	Opposition Result	Opposition Result	Opposition Result	Opposition Result	Opposition Result	Opposition Result	Rank
Daulet Niyazbekov	−55 kg	Bye	Hazewinkel (USA); W 3–1 ^{PP}	Peker (TUR); W 3–1 ^{PP}	Otarsultanov (RUS); L 1–3 ^{PP}	Bye		Yang K-I (PRK); L 1–3 ^{PP}	5
Dauren Zhumagaziyev	−60 kg	Bye	Esmaeilpour (IRI); L 1–3 ^{PP}	Did not advance					12
Akzhurek Tanatarov	−66 kg	Bye	Kvyatkovskyy (UKR); W 3–1 ^{PP}	Safaryan (ARM); W 3–1 ^{PP}	Kumar (IND); L 1–3 ^{PP}	Bye		Şahin (TUR); W 3–1 ^{PP}	3rd place, bronze medalist(s)
Abdulkhakim Shapiev	−74 kg	Bye	Ouechtati (TUN); W 3–1 ^{PP}	Hatos (HUN); L 0–3 ^{PO}	Did not advance				10
Yermek Baiduashov	−84 kg	Lashgari (IRI); L 0–3 ^{PO}	Did not advance						19
Taimuraz Tigiyev	−96 kg	Gadisov (RUS); L 1–3 ^{PP}	Did not advance						14
Daulet Shabanbay	−120 kg	Bye	Chintoan (ROU); W 3–1 ^{PP}	Modzmanashvili (GEO); L 0–3 ^{PO}	Did not advance	Bye	Ruíz (MEX); W 5–0 ^{VT}	Makhov (RUS); L 1–3 ^{PP}	3rd place, bronze medalist(s)

Men's Greco-Roman

Athlete	Event	Qualification	Round of 16	Quarterfinal	Semifinal	Repechage 1	Repechage 2	Final / BM	
Athlete	Event	Opposition Result	Opposition Result	Opposition Result	Opposition Result	Opposition Result	Opposition Result	Opposition Result	Rank
Almat Kebispayev	−60 kg	Temirov (UKR); W 3–0 ^{PO}	Liendo (VEN); W 3–1 ^{PP}	Norouzi (IRI); L 0–3 ^{PO}	Did not advance	Bye	Angelov (BUL); W 3–0 ^{PO}	Matsumoto (JPN); L 0–5 ^{VT}	5
Darkhan Bayakhmetov	−66 kg	Maksimović (SRB); W 3–0 ^{PO}	Venckaitis (LTU); L 1-3 ^{PP}	Did not advance					9
Askhat Dilmukhamedov	−74 kg	Bye	Kikiniou (BLR); L 0–3 ^{PO}	Did not advance					15
Daniyal Gadzhiyev	−84 kg	Bye	Marinov (BUL); W 3–0 ^{PO}	Khugayev (RUS); L 0–3 ^{PO}	Did not advance	Bye	Selimau (BLR); W 3–1 ^{PP}	Gegeshidze (GEO); W 3–1 ^{PP}	3rd place, bronze medalist(s)
Nurmakhan Tinaliyev	−120 kg	Eurén (SWE); L 0–3 ^{PO}	Did not advance						18

Women's freestyle

Athlete	Event	Qualification	Round of 16	Quarterfinal	Semifinal	Repechage 1	Repechage 2	Final / BM	
Athlete	Event	Opposition Result	Opposition Result	Opposition Result	Opposition Result	Opposition Result	Opposition Result	Opposition Result	Rank
Zhuldyz Eshimova	−48 kg	Bye	Kaladzinskaya (BLR); L 0–5 ^{VT}	Did not advance					15
Yelena Shalygina	−63 kg	Ostapchuk (UKR); L 0–5 ^{VT}	Did not advance						15
Guzel Manyurova	−72 kg	Bye	Hamaguchi (JPN); W 3–1 ^{PP}	Vorobieva (RUS); L 0–5 ^{VT}	Did not advance	Bye	Burmistrova (UKR); W 3–0 ^{PO}	Wang J (CHN); W 3–1 ^{PP}	3rd place, bronze medalist(s)
