= Ukraine at the 2012 Summer Olympics =

- IOC code: UKR
- NOC: National Olympic Committee of Ukraine
- Website: www.noc-ukr.org (in Ukrainian and English)

in London
- Competitors: 238 in 21 sports
- Flag bearers: Roman Hontyuk (opening); Oleksiy Torokhtiy (closing)
- Medals Ranked 14th: Gold 5 Silver 4 Bronze 10 Total 19

Summer Olympics appearances (overview)
- 1996; 2000; 2004; 2008; 2012; 2016; 2020; 2024; 2028

Other related appearances
- Austria (1896–1912); Hungary (1896–1912); Russian Empire (1900–1912); Czechoslovakia (1920–1936); Poland (1924–1936); Romania (1924–1936); Soviet Union (1952–1988); Unified Team (1992)

Ukraine competed at the 2012 Summer Olympics in London, from July 27 to August 12, 2012. This was the nation's fifth consecutive appearance at the Summer Olympics in the post-Soviet era. The National Olympic Committee of Ukraine sent a total of 238 athletes, split equally between men and women, to compete in 21 sports.

Ukraine left London with a total of 19 Olympic medals (5 gold, 4 silver, and 10 bronze), their lowest in Summer Olympic history since their debut in 1996. Five of these medals were awarded to the team in boxing; three each in athletics and sprint canoeing, and two each in fencing, shooting, and weightlifting. Two Ukrainian athletes won more than a single Olympic medal, while all of their competitors in sprint canoeing won at least a medal. For the first time in its history, Ukraine did not win an Olympic medal in archery.

Among the nation's medalists were épée fencer Yana Shemyakina and the women's quadruple sculls team, led by Yana Dementyeva, who both won Ukraine's first Olympic gold medals in their respective events. Sprint canoer Inna Osypenko, who won two silver in London, became one of the most successful Ukrainian athletes in history, with a total of four Olympic medals. Meanwhile, Yuriy Cheban won the coveted gold medal in the men's sprint canoe singles, in addition to his bronze from Beijing. Vasyl Lomachenko became the first Ukrainian boxer and twelfth in history to claim two Olympic titles. Sabre fencer Olha Kharlan defeated the reigning champion Mariel Zagunis from the United States to win the bronze medal. Track runner Yelizaveta Bryzhina followed her parents' footsteps to lead her team and win the nation's first Olympic medal in women's sprint relay. Pistol shooter Olena Kostevych recaptured her sporting success from eight years before by winning two bronze medals, in addition to her Olympic title from Athens.

== Medalists ==
Medal	Name	Sport	Event	Date
Gold	Yana Shemyakina	Fencing	Women's épée	30 July
Gold	Yana Dementyeva; Nataliya Dovhodko; Anastasiya Kozhenkova; Kateryna Tarasenko	Rowing	Women's quadruple sculls	1 August
Gold	Yuriy Cheban	Canoeing	Men's C-1 200 m	11 August
Gold	Oleksandr Usyk	Boxing	Men's heavyweight	11 August
Gold	Vasyl Lomachenko	Boxing	Men's lightweight	12 August
Silver	Inna Osypenko	Canoeing	Women's K-1 500 m	9 August
Silver	Inna Osypenko	Canoeing	Women's K-1 200 m	11 August
Silver	Denys Berinchyk	Boxing	Men's light welterweight	12 August
Silver	Valerii Andriitsev	Wrestling	Men's freestyle 96 kg	12 August
Bronze	Olena Kostevych	Shooting	Women's 10 m air pistol	29 July
Bronze	Yulia Paratova	Weightlifting	Women's 53 kg	29 July
Bronze	Olena Kostevych	Shooting	Women's 25 m pistol	1 August
Bronze	Olha Kharlan	Fencing	Women's sabre	1 August
Bronze	Olha Saladuha	Athletics	Women's triple jump	5 August
Bronze	Ihor Radivilov	Gymnastics	Men's vault	6 August
Bronze	Olesya Povh; Khrystyna Stuy; Mariya Ryemyen; Yelizaveta Bryzhina	Athletics	Women's 4 × 100 m relay	10 August
Bronze	Taras Shelestyuk	Boxing	Men's welterweight	10 August
Bronze	Oleksandr Hvozdyk	Boxing	Light heavyweight	10 August
Bronze	Alina Lohvynenko; Olha Zemlyak; Hanna Yaroshchuk; Nataliya Pyhyda	Athletics	Women's 4 × 400 metres relay	11 August

Medals by sport
Sport	1st place, gold medalist(s)	2nd place, silver medalist(s)	3rd place, bronze medalist(s)	Total
Boxing	2	1	2	5
Canoeing	1	2	0	3
Fencing	1	0	1	2
Weightlifting	0	0	1	1
Rowing	1	0	0	1
Athletics	0	0	3	3
Wrestling	0	1	0	1
Shooting	0	0	2	2
Gymnastics	0	0	1	1
Total	5	4	10	19

== Delegation ==
The National Olympic Committee of Ukraine selected a team of 238 athletes, dividing into men and women by half, to compete in 21 sports; it was the nation's third-largest team sent to the Olympics, but the smallest since 2000. For the second consecutive time in its Olympic history, Ukraine did not qualify athletes in any of the team-based sports. Athletics was the largest team by sport, with a total of 78 competitors.

The Ukrainian team featured twelve Olympic medalists from Beijing, five of them defending (rifle hooter Artur Ayvazyan, archer Viktor Ruban, heptathlete Nataliya Dobrynska, sprint kayaker Inna Osypenko, and former featherweight boxer Vasyl Lomachenko, who competed in the men's lightweight division). Eights rower Oleh Lykov and windsurfer Maksym Oberemko became first Ukrainian athletes to compete in five Olympic games. Along with Ayvazyan, four Ukrainian athletes made their fourth Olympic appearance: windsurfer Olha Maslivets, pole vaulter and bronze medalist Denys Yurchenko, freestyle and open water swimmer Ihor Chervynskyy, and mountain biker Serhiy Rysenko. Rower Kostiantyn Zaitsev marked his Olympic return in London after a twelve-year absence, and competed in men's quadruple sculls. Meanwhile, former freestyle swimmer Olga Beresnyeva and long-distance runner Serhiy Lebid were among the nation's athletes who made their comeback at these Olympic games after an eight-year absence. Hammer thrower Oleksandr Dryhol, at age 46, was the oldest athlete of the team, while relay swimmer Iryna Hlavnyk was the youngest at age 16.

Other notable Ukrainian athletes featured platform diver and former Youth Olympic games medalist Oleksandr Bondar, sprint canoer and Olympic bronze medalist Yuriy Cheban, 2011 World Amateur Boxing champion Oleksandr Usyk in the men's heavyweight division, and former Olympic champions Irini Merleni in women's freestyle wrestling, Yuri Nikitin in trampoline gymnastics, and Olena Kostevych in pistol shooting. Judoka and Olympic bronze medalist Roman Gontiuk was the nation's flag bearer at the opening ceremony.

The following is the list of number of competitors participating in the Games. Note that reserves in fencing, field hockey, football, and handball are not counted as athletes:

Sport	Men	Women	Total
Archery	3	3	6
Athletics	30	48	78
Badminton	1	1	2
Boxing	7	0	7
Canoeing	1	1	2
Cycling	3	7	10
Diving	5	4	9
Equestrian	3	2	5
Fencing	3	5	8
Gymnastics	6	10	16
Judo	7	3	10
Modern pentathlon	2	2	4
Rowing	15	6	21
Sailing	3	1	4
Shooting	5	3	8
Swimming	8	6	14
Synchronized swimming	0	2	2
Table tennis	2	2	4
Taekwondo	1	1	2
Tennis	1	1	2
Triathlon	1	1	2
Weightlifting	6	3	9
Wrestling	9	4	13
Total	119	119	238

== Archery ==
Ukraine has qualified three archers for the men's individual event, three archers for the women's individual event, a team for the men's team event and a team for the women's team event.

Previously, Ukraine has won a total of five Olympic medals in archery, one gold, one silver, and two bronze. Archer Viktor Ruban, the defending champion of the men's individual archery competition from the Beijing Olympics, managed to qualify into three consecutive rounds, until he was lost in the quarterfinal round by Korea's Oh Jin-Hyek, who later won the gold medal and then succeeded Ruban's Olympic title during the final rounds of the competition.

Men

Athlete	Event	Ranking round		Round of 64	Round of 32	Round of 16	Quarterfinals	Semifinals	Final / BM	
Athlete	Event	Score	Seed	Opposition Score	Opposition Score	Opposition Score	Opposition Score	Opposition Score	Opposition Score	Rank
Dmytro Hrachov	Individual	665	28	Frangilli (ITA) (37); W 7–2	Furukawa (JPN) (68); L 4–6	Did not advance				
Markiyan Ivashko	Individual	667	24	Cuesta (ESP) (41); W 6–4	Myo Aung (MYA) (56); W 7–1	Kuo C-W (TPE) (35); L 0–6	Did not advance			
Viktor Ruban	Individual	660	43	Liu Zw (CHN) (22); W 6–0	Chen (TPE) (54); W 6–0	Prevost (FRA) (6); W 6–4	Oh J-H (KOR) (8); L 1–7	Did not advance		
Dmytro Hrachov; Markiyan Ivashko; Viktor Ruban	Team	1992	9	—N/a		Great Britain (8); W 223–212	South Korea (1); L 220–227	Did not advance		

Women

Athlete	Event	Ranking round		Round of 64	Round of 32	Round of 16	Quarterfinals	Semifinals	Final / BM	
Athlete	Event	Score	Seed	Opposition Score	Opposition Score	Opposition Score	Opposition Score	Opposition Score	Opposition Score	Rank
Tetyana Dorokhova	Individual	599	59	Kanie (JPN) (6); L 1–7	Did not advance					
Kateryna Palekha	Individual	624	51	Leek (USA) (14); L 2–6	Did not advance					
Lidiia Sichenikova	Individual	645	32	Timofeyeva (BLR) (33); L 5–6	Did not advance					
Tetyana Dorokhova; Kateryna Palekha; Lidiia Sichenikova	Team	1868	12	—N/a		Japan (5); L 192–207	Did not advance			

== Athletics ==
Ukrainian athletes have so far achieved qualifying standards in the following athletics events (up to a maximum of 3 athletes in each event at the 'A' Standard, and 1 at the 'B' Standard):

Key

- Note–Ranks given for track events are within the athlete's heat only
- Q = Qualified for the next round
- q = Qualified for the next round as a fastest loser or, in field events, by position without achieving the qualifying target
- NR = National record
- N/A = Round not applicable for the event
- Bye = Athlete not required to compete in round

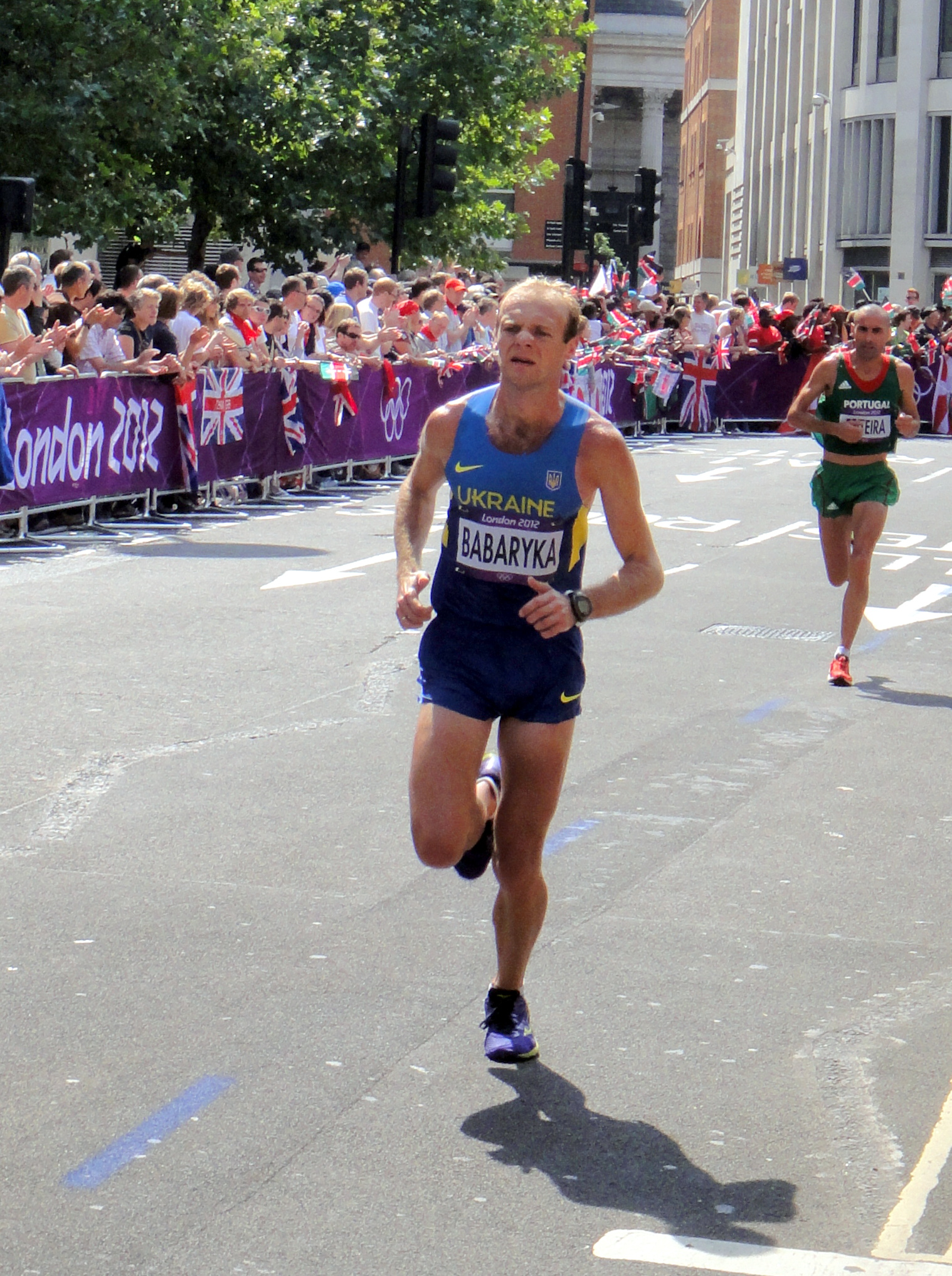
Ivan Babaryka in men's marathon

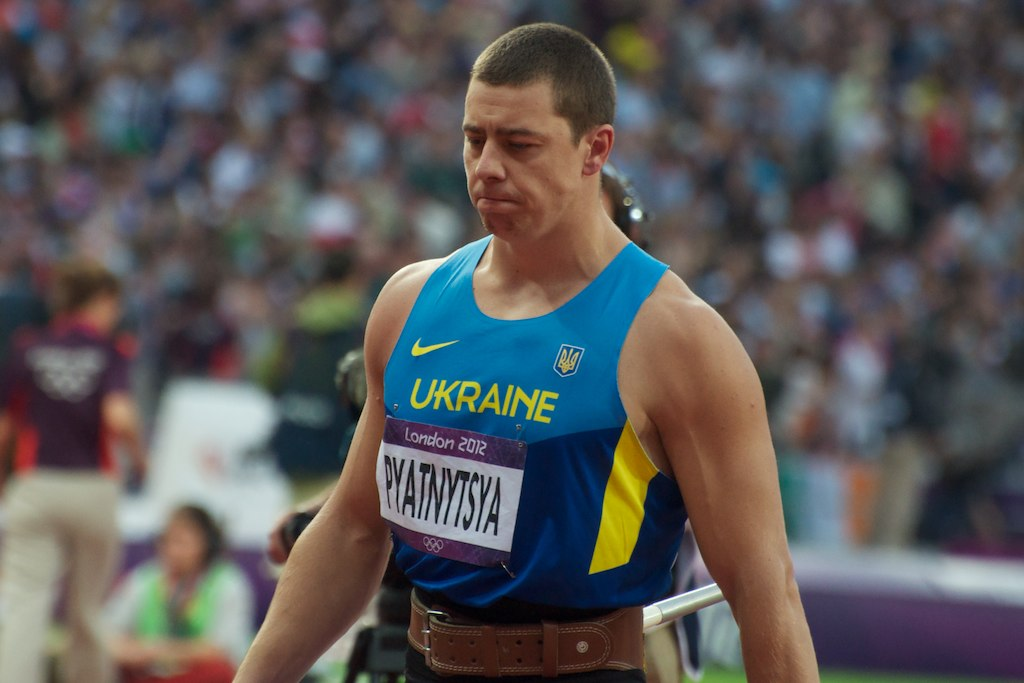
Oleksandr Pyatnytsya takes home the silver in men's javelin throw.

Men
Track & road events

Athlete	Event	Heat		Semifinal		Final	
Athlete	Event	Result	Rank	Result	Rank	Result	Rank
Serhiy Smelyk	200 m	20.65	4	Did not advance			
Vitaliy Butrym	400 m	47.62	5	Did not advance			
Serhiy Lebid	5000 m	13:53.15	17	—N/a		Did not advance	
Mykola Labovskyi	10000 m	—N/a				29.32.12	26
Stanislav Melnykov	400 m hurdles	50.13	3 Q	50.19	6	Did not advance	
Vadym Slobodenyuk	3000 m steeplechase	8:23.35	8	—N/a		Did not advance	
Ivan Babaryka	Marathon	—N/a				2:21:52	59
Oleksandr Sitkovskyy	Marathon	—N/a				2:12:56	12
Vitaliy Shafar	Marathon	—N/a				2:16:36	29
Ruslan Dmytrenko	20 km walk	—N/a				1:23.21	30
Nazar Kovalenko	20 km walk	—N/a				1:22.54	27
Ivan Losyev	20 km walk	—N/a				1:26:50	47
Serhiy Budza	50 km walk	—N/a				3:56:35	35
Ihor Hlavan	50 km walk	—N/a				3:48:07	19
Oleksiy Kazanin	50 km walk	—N/a				DSQ	

Field events

Athlete	Event	Qualification		Final	
Athlete	Event	Distance	Position	Distance	Position
Viktor Kuznyetsov	Long jump	7.50	31	Did not advance	
Sheryf El-Sheryf	Triple jump	16.60	13	Did not advance	
Bohdan Bondarenko	High jump	2.26	=8 q	2.29	7
Dmytro Demyanyuk	High jump	2.21	=16	Did not advance	
Andriy Protsenko	High jump	2.29	5 q	2.25	9
Maksym Mazuryk	Pole vault	5.35	=18	Did not advance	
Denys Yurchenko	Pole vault	NM	—	Did not advance	
Andriy Semenov	Shot put	NM	—	Did not advance	
Mykyta Nesterenko	Discus throw	59.17	34	Did not advance	
Roman Avramenko	Javelin throw	80.06	14	Did not advance	
Oleksandr Pyatnytsya	Javelin throw	82.40	4 Q	84.51	DSQ*
Oleksandr Dryhol	Hammer throw	69.57	34	Did not advance	
Artem Rubanko	Hammer throw	NM	—	Did not advance	
Oleksiy Sokyrskyy	Hammer throw	77.65	4 Q	78.25	4

* On 9 August 2016, IOC announced that Oleksandr Pyatnytsya of Ukraine has been disqualified from the 2012 Summer Olympics and ordered to return the silver medal from the men's javelin throw event. Reanalysis of his samples from London 2012 resulted in a positive test for the prohibited substance dehydrochlormethyltestosterone (turinabol).

Combined events – Decathlon

Athlete	Event	100 m	LJ	SP	HJ	400 m	110H	DT	PV	JT	1500 m	Final	Rank
Oleksiy Kasyanov	Result	10.56	7.55	14.45	1.99	48.44	14.09	46.72	4.60	54.87	4:33.68	8283	7
Oleksiy Kasyanov	Points	961	947	756	794	888	963	802	790	661	721	8283	7

Women
Track & road events

Athlete	Event	Heat		Quarterfinal		Semifinal		Final	
Athlete	Event	Result	Rank	Result	Rank	Result	Rank	Result	Rank
Nataliya Pohrebnyak	100 m	Bye		11.46	5	Did not advance			
Olesya Povh	100 m	Bye		11.18	3 Q	11.30	6	Did not advance	
Yelizaveta Bryzhina	200 m	22.82	3 Q	—N/a		22.64	5	Did not advance	
Mariya Ryemyen	200 m	22.58	1 Q	—N/a		22.62	4	Did not advance	
Khrystyna Stuy	200 m	22.66	3 Q	—N/a		22.76	4	Did not advance	
Alina Lohvynenko	400 m	52.08	2 Q	—N/a		51.38	6	Did not advance	
Nataliya Pyhyda	400 m	51.09	2 Q	—N/a		51.41	5	Did not advance	
Yuliya Krevsun	800 m	DNF		—N/a		Did not advance			
Liliya Lobanova	800 m	DNS		—N/a		Did not advance			
Nataliya Lupu	800 m	2:08.35	1 Q	—N/a		2:01.63	5	Did not advance	
Anna Mishchenko	1500 m	4:13.63	13	—N/a		Did not advance			
Anzhelika Shevchenko	1500 m	4:12.97	13	—N/a		Did not advance			
Lyudmyla Kovalenko	5000 m	15:18.60	11	—N/a				Did not advance	
Olha Skrypak	10000 m	—N/a						32:14.59	20
Hanna Titimets	400 m hurdles	55.08	2 Q	—N/a		55.10	4	Did not advance	
Hanna Yaroshchuk	400 m hurdles	54.81	3 Q	—N/a		55.51	4	Did not advance	
Svitlana Shmidt	3000 m steeplechase	10:01.09	12	—N/a				Did not advance	
Valentyna Zhudina	3000 m steeplechase	9:37.90	7	—N/a				Did not advance	
Yelizaveta Bryzhina; Nataliya Pohrebnyak; Olesya Povh; Mariya Ryemyen; Khrystyna Stuy	4 × 100 m relay	42.36	1 Q	—N/a				42.04 NR	3rd place, bronze medalist(s)
Yuliya Baraley; Alina Lohvynenko; Yuliya Olishevska; Darya Prystupa; Nataliya Pyhyda; Olha Zemlyak; Hanna Titimets; Hanna Yaroshchuk	4 × 400 m relay	3:25.90	2 Q	—N/a				3:23.57	3rd place, bronze medalist(s)
Olena Burkovska	Marathon	—N/a						2:33:26	48
Tetyana Filonyuk	Marathon	—N/a						DNF	
Tetyana Hamera-Shmyrko	Marathon	—N/a						2:24:32	5
Nadiya Borovska	20 km walk	—N/a						1:30:03	16
Olena Shumkina	20 km walk	—N/a						1:36:42	50
Olha Yakovenko	20 km walk	—N/a						1:32:07	27

* Viktoriya Pyatachenko was selected in the women's 4 × 100 m relay, but did not compete.

Field events

Athlete	Event	Qualification		Final	
Athlete	Event	Distance	Position	Distance	Position
Viktoriya Rybalko	Long jump	6.29	20	Did not advance	
Marharyta Tverdohlib	Long jump	6.19	26	Did not advance	
Hanna Demydova	Triple jump	13.97	15	Did not advance	
Hanna Knyazyeva	Triple jump	14.33	6 Q	14.56	4
Olha Saladuha	Triple jump	14.35	5 Q	14.79	3rd place, bronze medalist(s)
Olena Holosha	High jump	1.90	=15	Did not advance	
Vita Styopina	High jump	1.80	34	Did not advance	
Nataliya Mazuryk	Pole vault	4.25	26	Did not advance	
Hanna Shelekh	Pole vault	4.10	33	Did not advance	
Kateryna Karsak	Discus throw	58.64	28	Did not advance	
Nataliya Semonova	Discus throw	60.61	18	Did not advance	
Marharyta Dorozhon	Javelin throw	56.74	28	Did not advance	
Hanna Hatsko	Javelin throw	58.37	22	Did not advance	
Vira Rebryk	Javelin throw	58.97	19	Did not advance	
Iryna Novozhylova	Hammer throw	65.35	33	Did not advance	
Hanna Skydan	Hammer throw	68.50	19	Did not advance	

Combined events – Heptathlon

Athlete	Event	100H	HJ	SP	200 m	LJ	JT	800 m	Final	Rank
Nataliya Dobrynska	Result	13.57	1.83	15.05	24.69	3.70	DNS	—	DNF	
Nataliya Dobrynska	Points	1040	1016	864	915	242	0	—	DNF	
Hanna Melnychenko	Result	13.32	1.80	12.96	24.09	6.40	43.86	2:12.90	6392	10
Hanna Melnychenko	Points	1077	978	725	972	975	742	923	6392	10
Lyudmyla Yosypenko	Result	13.25	1.83	13.90	23.68	6.31	49.63	2:13.28	6618	4
Lyudmyla Yosypenko	Points	1087	1016	787	1012	946	853	912	6618	4

== Badminton ==
Athlete	Event	Group stage			Elimination	Quarterfinal	Semifinal	Final / BM	
Athlete	Event	Opposition Score	Opposition Score	Rank	Opposition Score	Opposition Score	Opposition Score	Opposition Score	Rank
Dmytro Zavadsky	Men's singles	Zwiebler (GER); L 21–17, 10–21, 16–21	Rasheed (MDV); W 21–8, 21–8	2	Did not advance				
Larisa Griga	Women's singles	Gavnholt (CZE); L 13–21, 21–15, 15–21	Schenk (GER); L 13–21, 21–15, 15–21	3	Did not advance				

== Boxing ==
Ukraine has qualified seven boxers at the London games. This was, by far, Ukraine's best performance at the Olympic games, after winning all but two medals in London. Five of them were awarded to the team, including two gold medals won by lightweight boxer Vasyl Lomachenko and heavyweight boxer Oleksandr Usyk. Lomachenko, former Olympic champion in the men's featherweight division at Beijing, was also the first boxer to win more than a single title in its history.

Men

Athlete	Event	Round of 32	Round of 16	Quarterfinals	Semifinals	Final	
Athlete	Event	Opposition Result	Opposition Result	Opposition Result	Opposition Result	Opposition Result	Rank
Pavlo Ishchenko	Bantamweight	Diaz (USA); L 9–19	Did not advance				
Vasyl Lomachenko	Lightweight	Bye	Arias (DOM); W 15–3	Verdejo (PUR); W 14–9	Toledo (CUB); W 14–11	Han S-C (KOR); W 19–9	1st place, gold medalist(s)
Denys Berinchyk	Light welterweight	Bye	Yigit (SWE); W 24–23	Horn (AUS); W 21–13	Mönkh-Erdene (MGL); W 29–21	Iglesias (CUB); L 15–22	2nd place, silver medalist(s)
Taras Shelestyuk	Welterweight	Bye	Belous (MDA); W 15–7	Vastine (FRA); W 18^{+}–18	Evans (GBR); L 10–11	Did not advance	3rd place, bronze medalist(s)
Evhen Khytrov	Middleweight	Bye	Ogogo (GBR); L 18–18^{+}	Did not advance			
Oleksandr Hvozdyk	Light heavyweight	Dauhaliavets (BLR); W 18–10	Bravo (NCA); W 18–6	Benchabla (ALG); W 19–17	Niyazymbetov (KAZ); L 13–13^{+}	Did not advance	3rd place, bronze medalist(s)
Oleksandr Usyk	Heavyweight	—N/a	Bye	Beterbiyev (RUS); W 17–13	Pulev (BUL); W 21–5	Russo (ITA); W 14–11	1st place, gold medalist(s)

== Canoeing ==
=== Sprint ===
Ukraine has qualified boats for the following events

Athlete	Event	Heats		Semifinals		Final	
Athlete	Event	Time	Rank	Time	Rank	Time	Rank
Yuriy Cheban	Men's C-1 200 m	41.036	1 Q	40.647	1 FA	42.291	1st place, gold medalist(s)
Inna Osypenko	Women's K-1 200 m	42.119	1 Q	41.360	3 FA	45.053	2nd place, silver medalist(s)
Inna Osypenko	Women's K-1 500 m	1:52.268	4 Q	1:51.515	2 FA	1:52.685	2nd place, silver medalist(s)

Qualification Legend: FA = Qualify to final (medal); FB = Qualify to final B (non-medal)

== Cycling ==
Ukraine has qualified in the following events

=== Road ===
Athlete	Event	Time	Rank
Andriy Hrivko	Men's road race	5:46:05	17
Dmytro Krivtsov	Men's road race	5:46:37	66
Alyona Andruk	Women's road race	OTL	

=== Track ===
Sprint

Athlete	Event	Qualification		Round 1	Repechage 1	Round 2	Repechage 2	Quarterfinals	Semifinals	Final	
Athlete	Event	Time Speed (km/h)	Rank	Opposition Time Speed (km/h)	Opposition Time Speed (km/h)	Opposition Time Speed (km/h)	Opposition Time Speed (km/h)	Opposition Time Speed (km/h)	Opposition Time Speed (km/h)	Opposition Time Speed (km/h)	Rank
Lyubov Shulika	Women's sprint	11.319; 63.609	10	Hansen (NZL); W 11.808; 60.975	Bye	Vogel (GER); L	Kanis (NED); Lee W S (HKG); W 11.461; 62.821	Meares (AUS); L	Did not advance	5th place final Krupeckaitė (LTU); Guerra (CUB); Panarina (BLR); L	7

Team sprint

Athlete	Event	Qualification		Semifinals		Final	
Athlete	Event	Time Speed (km/h)	Rank	Opposition Time Speed (km/h)	Rank	Opposition Time Speed (km/h)	Rank
Lyubov Shulika; Olena Tsyos	Women's team sprint	33.708; 53.399	7 Q	Great Britain; W 33.620; 53.539	4 Q	Australia; L 33.491; 53.745	4

Pursuit

Athlete	Event	Qualification		Semifinals		Final	
Athlete	Event	Time	Rank	Opponent Results	Rank	Opponent Results	Rank
Yelyzaveta Bochkaryova; Svitlana Halyuk; Lesya Kalytovska	Women's team pursuit	3:25.160	9	Did not advance			

Keirin

Athlete	Event	1st Round	Repechage	2nd Round	Final
Athlete	Event	Rank	Rank	Rank	Rank
Lyubov Shulika	Women's keirin	5 R	4	Did not advance	13

=== Mountain biking ===
Athlete	Event	Time	Rank
Serhiy Rysenko	Men's cross-country	1:37:32	31
Yana Belomoyna	Women's cross-country	1:35:46	13

== Diving ==
Men

Athlete	Event	Preliminaries		Semifinals		Final	
Athlete	Event	Points	Rank	Points	Rank	Points	Rank
Illya Kvasha	3 m springboard	470.25	6 Q	478.60	7 Q	462.25	8
Oleksiy Pryhorov	3 m springboard	439.80	17 Q	414.15	16	Did not advance	
Oleksandr Bondar	10 m platform	481.65	7 Q	496.30	11 Q	443.70	12
Anton Zakharov	10 m platform	451.35	12 Q	464.70	15	Did not advance	
Illya Kvasha; Oleksiy Pryhorov	3 m synchronized springboard	—N/a				434.22	4
Oleksandr Bondar; Oleksandr Gorshkovozov	10 m synchronized platform	—N/a				433.32	8

Women

Athlete	Event	Preliminaries		Semifinals		Final	
Athlete	Event	Points	Rank	Points	Rank	Points	Rank
Olena Fedorova	3 m springboard	308.70	14 Q	314.70	12 Q	317.80	9
Hanna Pysmenska	3 m springboard	271.50	21	Did not advance			
Iuliia Prokopchuk	10 m platform	324.85	11 Q	315.80	12 Q	344.55	12
Olena Fedorova; Hanna Pysmenska	3 m synchronized springboard	—N/a				302.40	6
Iuliia Prokopchuk; Viktoriya Potyekhina	10 m synchronized platform	—N/a				299.64	8

== Equestrian ==
Ukraine has qualified a team (four athletes) for Show jumping and one individual for Dressage for the Games.

=== Dressage ===
Athlete	Horse	Event	Grand Prix		Grand Prix Special		Grand Prix Freestyle		Overall	
Athlete	Horse	Event	Score	Rank	Score	Rank	Technical	Artistic	Score	Rank
Svetlana Kiselyova	Parish	Individual	66.763	46	Did not advance					

=== Jumping ===
Athlete	Horse	Event	Qualification								Final					Total	
Athlete	Horse	Event	Round 1		Round 2			Round 3			Round A		Round B			Total	
Athlete	Horse	Event	Penalties	Rank	Penalties	Total	Rank	Penalties	Total	Rank	Penalties	Rank	Penalties	Total	Rank	Penalties	Rank
Björn Nagel	Niack de l'Abbaye	Individual	4	=42 Q	4	8	=31 Q	13	21	=41	Did not advance					21	=41
Katharina Offel	Vivant	Individual	4	=42 Q	12	16	58	Did not advance								16	58
Oleksandr Onyshchenko	Comte d'Arsouilles	Individual	18	70	Did not advance											18	70
Cassio Rivetti	Temple Road	Individual	0	=1 Q	5	5	=27 Q	12	17	37 Q	5	=20 Q	4	9	=12	9	=12
Björn Nagel; Katharina Offel; Oleksandr Onyshchenko; Cassio Rivetti	See above	Team	—N/a								21	14	Did not advance			21	14

== Fencing ==
Ukraine has qualified 8 fencers.

Men

Athlete	Event	Round of 64	Round of 32	Round of 16	Quarterfinal	Semifinal	Final / BM	
Athlete	Event	Opposition Score	Opposition Score	Opposition Score	Opposition Score	Opposition Score	Opposition Score	Rank
Dmytro Karyuchenko	Individual épée	—N/a	Borel (FRA); L 10–15	Did not advance				
Dmytro Boiko	Individual sabre	Bye	Dumitrescu (ROU); L 12–15	Did not advance				

Women

Athlete	Event	Round of 64	Round of 32	Round of 16	Quarterfinal	Semifinal	Final / BM	
Athlete	Event	Opposition Score	Opposition Score	Opposition Score	Opposition Score	Opposition Score	Opposition Score	Rank
Olena Kryvytska	Individual épée	Scanlan (USA); W 15–13	Măroiu (ROU); L 10–15	Did not advance				
Kseniya Pantelyeyeva	Individual épée	Yeung C L (HKG); W 15–11	Li N (CHN); L 10–15	Did not advance				
Yana Shemyakina	Individual épée	Bye	Shutova (RUS); W 15–12	Brânză (ROU); W 14–13	Gherman (ROU); W 15–14	Sun Yj (CHN); W 14–13	Heidemann (GER); W 9–8	1st place, gold medalist(s)
Olena Kryvytska; Kseniya Pantelyeyeva; Anfisa Pochkalova; Yana Shemyakina	Team épée	—N/a			Russia; L 34–45	Classification semi-final Germany; L 36–45	7th place final Italy; L 40–45	8
Olha Leleyko	Individual foil	Khelfaoui (ALG); W 15–4	Nam H-H (KOR); L 9–15	Did not advance				
Olha Kharlan	Individual sabre	—N/a	Tschomakova (BUL); W 15–8	Mikina (AZE); W 15–10	Vecchi (ITA); W 15–9	Velikaya (RUS); L 12–15	Zagunis (USA); W 15–10	3rd place, bronze medalist(s)

== Gymnastics ==
=== Artistic ===
Men
Team

Athlete	Event	Qualification								Final							
Athlete	Event	Apparatus						Total	Rank	Apparatus						Total	Rank
Athlete	Event	F	PH	R	V	PB	HB	Total	Rank	F	PH	R	V	PB	HB	Total	Rank
Mykola Kuksenkov	Team	14.533	14.900	15.000	15.766	15.066	14.666	89.931	6 Q	—N/a	15.100	15.233	—N/a	15.200	15.266	—N/a	
Vitalii Nakonechnyi	Team	14.066	14.933 Q	—N/a		14.133	14.800	—N/a		14.333	14.866	—N/a			14.266	—N/a	
Ihor Radivilov	Team	—N/a		15.300	16.266 Q	—N/a				—N/a		15.433	16.066	—N/a			
Oleh Stepko	Team	15.033	14.400	14.866	15.916	13.366	13.466	87.047	20	14.866	15.000	15.033	15.733	13.933	—N/a		
Oleg Verniaiev	Team	15.033	14.366	14.600	16.333	14.566	14.066	88.964	13 Q	14.866	—N/a		16.266	15.600	14.466	—N/a	
Total	Team	44.599	44.233	45.166	48.515	43.765	43.532	269.810	7 Q	44.065	44.966	45.699	48.065	44.733	43.998	271.526	4

Individual finals

Athlete	Event	Apparatus						Total	Rank
Athlete	Event	F	PH	R	V	PB	HB	Total	Rank
Mykola Kuksenkov	All-around	14.633	14.600	15.200	15.533	15.400	15.066	90.432	4
Vitalii Nakonechnyi	Pommel horse	—N/a	14.766	—N/a				14.766	6
Ihor Radivilov	Vault	—N/a			16.316	—N/a		16.316	3rd place, bronze medalist(s)
Oleg Verniaiev	All-around	14.533	13.966	14.866	16.233	15.033	14.300	88.931	11

Women

Athlete	Event	Qualification						Final					
Athlete	Event	Apparatus				Total	Rank	Apparatus				Total	Rank
Athlete	Event	F	V	UB	BB	Total	Rank	F	V	UB	BB	Total	Rank
Nataliya Kononenko	All-around	12.833	13.433	12.066	12.500	50.832	44	Did not advance					

=== Rhythmic ===
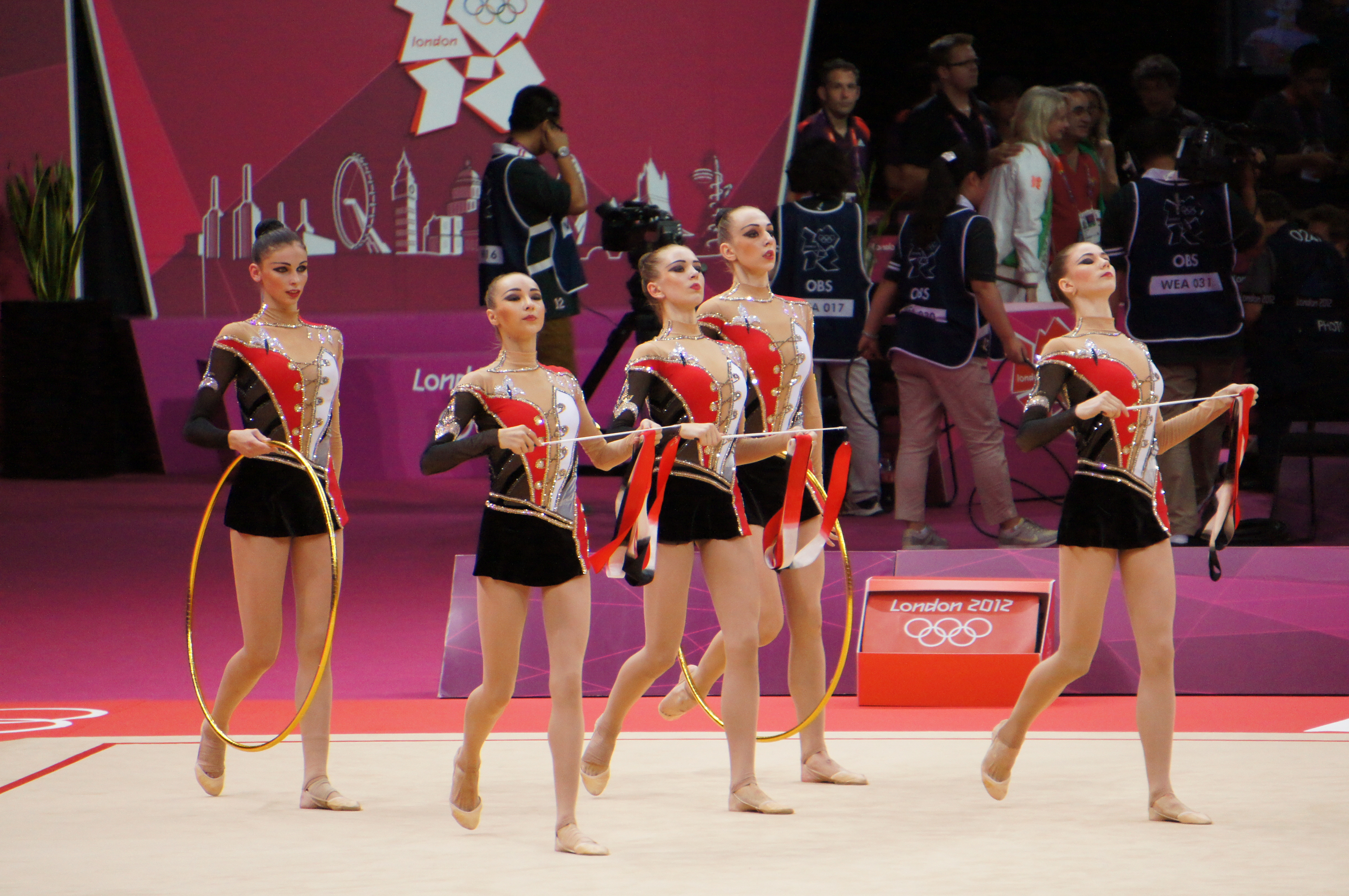
Ukraine performs the hoop and ribbon routine in team-all around rhythmic gymnastics.

Athlete	Event	Qualification						Final					
Athlete	Event	Hoop	Ball	Clubs	Ribbon	Total	Rank	Hoop	Ball	Clubs	Ribbon	Total	Rank
Alina Maksymenko	Individual	27.300	28.125	27.800	26.800	110.025	7 Q	27.950	26.675	27.550	27.450	109.625	6
Ganna Rizatdinova	Individual	27.350	26.800	27.750	26.950	108.850	10 Q	26.750	27.050	26.975	26.500	107.400	10

Athlete	Event	Qualification				Final			
Athlete	Event	5 balls	3 ribbons 2 hoops	Total	Rank	5 balls	3 ribbons 2 hoops	Total	Rank
Olena Dmytrash; Yevgeniya Gomon; Valeriia Gudym; Viktoriya Lenyshyn; Viktoriia Mazur; Svitlana Prokopova	Team	27.050	27.100	54.150	6 Q	27.200	27.175	54.375	5

=== Trampoline ===
Athlete	Event	Qualification		Final	
Athlete	Event	Score	Rank	Score	Rank
Yuri Nikitin	Men's	79.070	14	Did not advance	
Marina Kiyko	Women's	73.460	16	Did not advance	

== Judo ==
Men

Athlete	Event	Round of 64	Round of 32	Round of 16	Quarterfinals	Semifinals	Repechage	Final / BM	
Athlete	Event	Opposition Result	Opposition Result	Opposition Result	Opposition Result	Opposition Result	Opposition Result	Opposition Result	Rank
Georgii Zantaraia	−60 kg	Bye	Verde (ITA); L 0000–0001	Did not advance					
Sergiy Drebot	−66 kg	Bye	Cho J-H (KOR); L 0002–0011	Did not advance					
Volodymyr Soroka	−73 kg	Bye	Pina (POR); W 0102–0011	Sainjargal (MGL); L 0002–0011	Did not advance				
Artem Vasylenko	−81 kg	Bozbayev (KAZ); L 0001–1000	Did not advance						
Roman Hontyuk	−90 kg	—N/a	Camilo (BRA); L 0001–1001	Did not advance					
Artem Bloshenko	−100 kg	—N/a	Kelly (AUS); W 0010–0000	Hwang H-T (KOR); L 0000–1001	Did not advance				
Stanislav Bondarenko	+100 kg	—N/a	Ceraj (SLO); L 0002–0021	Did not advance					

Women

Athlete	Event	Round of 32	Round of 16	Quarterfinals	Semifinals	Repechage	Final / BM	
Athlete	Event	Opposition Result	Opposition Result	Opposition Result	Opposition Result	Opposition Result	Opposition Result	Rank
Nataliya Smal	−70 kg	Blanco (ESP); L 0002–0110	Did not advance					
Maryna Pryshchepa	−78 kg	Bye	Tcheuméo (FRA); L 0000–0100	Did not advance				
Iryna Kindzerska	+78 kg	Bye	Kocatürk (TUR); W 0103–0002	Tong W (CHN); L 0000–0100	Did not advance	Ivashchenko (RUS); W 0010–0002	Bryant (GBR); L 0011–0020	5

== Modern pentathlon ==
Ukraine has qualified two men and two women

Athlete	Event	Fencing (épée one touch)			Swimming (200 m freestyle)			Riding (show jumping)			Combined: shooting/running (10 m air pistol)/(3000 m)			Total points	Final rank
Athlete	Event	Results	Rank	MP points	Time	Rank	MP points	Penalties	Rank	MP points	Time	Rank	MP points	Total points	Final rank
Dmytro Kirpulyanskyy	Men's	17–18	=13	808	2:04.83	16	1304	860*	35	340	11:18.80	28	2288	4740	35
Pavlo Tymoshchenko	Men's	13–22	33	712	2:08.15	23	1264	60	14	1140	10:48.37	15	2408	5524	23
Iryna Khokhlova	Women's	18–17	=16	832	2:16.22	9	1168	0	1	1200	12:32.44	22	1992	5192	10
Victoria Tereshchuk	Women's	14–21	=28	736	2:16.07	8	1168	132	26	1068	12:24.64	18	2024	4996	23

* Did not finish

== Rowing ==
Ukraine has qualified the following boats

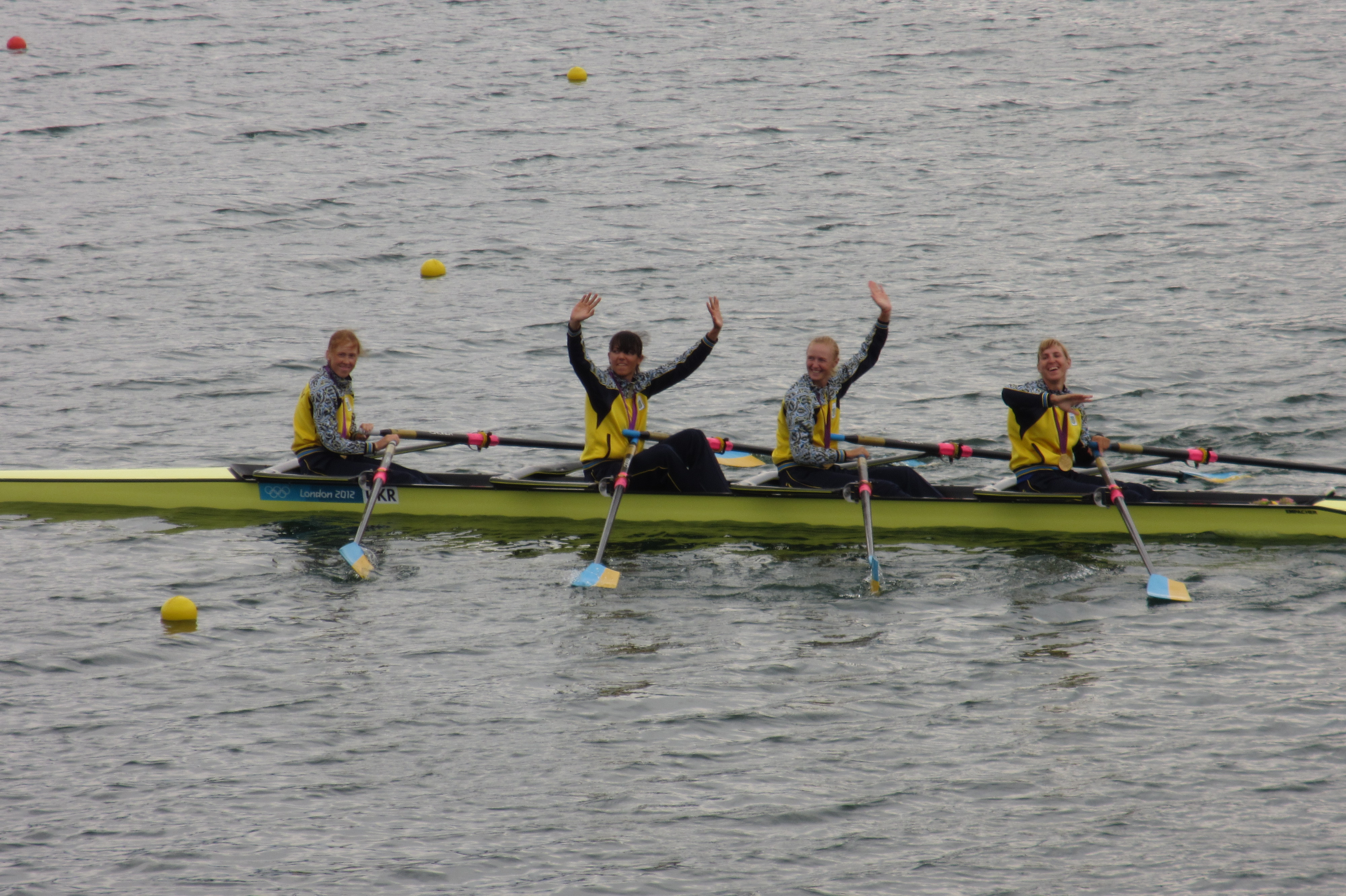
Ukraine wins its first ever Olympic gold medal for rowing in women's quadruple sculls.

Men

Athlete	Event	Heats		Repechage		Semifinals		Final	
Athlete	Event	Time	Rank	Time	Rank	Time	Rank	Time	Rank
Dmytro Mikhay; Artem Morozov	Double sculls	6:49.70	4 R	6:30.19	2 SA/B	6:36.52	6 FB	6:31.51	11
Sergiy Gryn; Ivan Dovgodko; Volodymyr Pavlovskiy; Kostiantyn Zaitsev	Quadruple sculls	5:43.46	3 SA/B	Bye		6:16.23	5 FB	6:01.23	9
Sergii Chykanov; Viktor Grebennykov; Anton Kholyaznykov; Valentyn Kletskoy; Oleksandr Konovaliuk (cox); Oleh Lykov; Artem Moroz; Andriy Pryveda; Ivan Tymko	Eight	5:38.02	4 R	5:42.19	6 FB	—N/a		6:07.33	8

Women

Athlete	Event	Heats		Repechage		Final	
Athlete	Event	Time	Rank	Time	Rank	Time	Rank
Olena Buryak; Anna Kravchenko	Double sculls	7:09.40	5 R	7:23.02	6 FB	7:36.65	10
Yana Dementyeva; Nataliya Dovgodko; Anastasiya Kozhenkova; Kateryna Tarasenko	Quadruple sculls	6:14.82	2 FA	Bye		6:35.93	1st place, gold medalist(s)

Qualification Legend: FA=Final A (medal); FB=Final B (non-medal); FC=Final C (non-medal); FD=Final D (non-medal); FE=Final E (non-medal); FF=Final F (non-medal); SA/B=Semifinals A/B; SC/D=Semifinals C/D; SE/F=Semifinals E/F; QF=Quarterfinals; R=Repechage

== Sailing ==
Ukraine has qualified 1 boat for each of the following events

Men

Athlete	Event	Race											Net points	Final rank
Athlete	Event	1	2	3	4	5	6	7	8	9	10	M*	Net points	Final rank
Maksym Oberemko	RS:X	~~36~~	35	16	28	17	31	23	14	6	11	EL	181	23
Valeriy Kudryashov	Laser	~~48~~	38	42	31	38	40	35	36	38	43	EL	341	44
Oleksiy Boryzov	Finn	21; RDG	18.6; RDG	19	19	15	19	~~23~~	14	17	18	EL	160.6	19

Women

Athlete	Event	Race											Net points	Final rank
Athlete	Event	1	2	3	4	5	6	7	8	9	10	M*	Net points	Final rank
Olha Maslivets	RS:X	3	4	~~14~~	10	3	3	1	3	7	10	4	48	4

M = Medal race; EL = Eliminated – did not advance into the medal race;
Scoring abbreviations are defined as follows: OCS – On course side of the starting line; DSQ – Disqualified; DNF – Did not finish; DNS – Did not start. RDG – Redress given.

== Shooting ==
Ukraine has ensured berths in the following events of shooting:

Men

Athlete	Event	Qualification		Final	
Athlete	Event	Points	Rank	Points	Rank
Artur Ayvazyan	50 m rifle 3 positions	1168	10	Did not advance	
Artur Ayvazyan	50 m rifle prone	593	21	Did not advance	
Artur Ayvazyan	10 m air rifle	593	19	Did not advance	
Roman Bondaruk	25 m rapid fire pistol	579	12	Did not advance	
Denys Kushnirov	10 m air pistol	577	19	Did not advance	
Serhiy Kulish	50 m rifle 3 positions	1166	14	Did not advance	
Serhiy Kulish	50 m rifle prone	583	49	Did not advance	
Serhiy Kulish	10 m air rifle	593	18	Did not advance	
Oleh Omelchuk	50 m pistol	548	29	Did not advance	
Oleh Omelchuk	10 m air pistol	583	6 Q	683.6	5

Women

Athlete	Event	Qualification		Final	
Athlete	Event	Points	Rank	Points	Rank
Olena Kostevych	25 m pistol	585	5 Q	788.6	3rd place, bronze medalist(s)
Olena Kostevych	10 m air pistol	387	2 Q	486.6	3rd place, bronze medalist(s)
Dariya Sharipova	50 m rifle 3 positions	573	38	Did not advance	
Dariya Sharipova	10 m air rifle	395	13	Did not advance	
Daria Tykhova	50 m rifle 3 positions	577	26	Did not advance	
Daria Tykhova	10 m air rifle	394	23	Did not advance	

== Swimming ==
Ukrainian swimmers have so far achieved qualifying standards in the following events (up to a maximum of 2 swimmers in each event at the Olympic Qualifying Time (OQT), and 1 at the Olympic Selection Time (OST)):

Men

Athlete	Event	Heat		Semifinal		Final	
Athlete	Event	Time	Rank	Time	Rank	Time	Rank
Ihor Borysyk	200 m breaststroke	2:12.61	22	Did not advance			
Ihor Chervynskyy	10 km open water	—N/a				1:50:56.9	14
Illya Chuyev	200 m butterfly	1:59.65	28	Did not advance			
Valeriy Dymo	100 m breaststroke	1:01.27	23	Did not advance			
Serhiy Frolov	400 m freestyle	3:50.63	17	—N/a		Did not advance	
Serhiy Frolov	1500 m freestyle	14:59.19	10	—N/a		Did not advance	
Andriy Hovorov	50 m freestyle	22.09	7 Q	22.12	14	Did not advance	
Oleksandr Isakov	100 m backstroke	55.43	35	Did not advance			
Oleksandr Isakov	200 m backstroke	2:00.78	30	Did not advance			
Maksym Shemberev	200 m individual medley	2:03.40	33	Did not advance			
Maksym Shemberev	400 m individual medley	4:16.63	15	—N/a		Did not advance	

Women

Athlete	Event	Heat		Semifinal		Final	
Athlete	Event	Time	Rank	Time	Rank	Time	Rank
Olha Beresnyeva	10 km open water	—N/a				1:58:44.4	7
Hanna Dzerkal	200 m breaststroke	2:27.09	17	Did not advance			
Hanna Dzerkal	200 m individual medley	2:14.55	18	Did not advance			
Hanna Dzerkal	400 m individual medley	4:48.19	26	—N/a		Did not advance	
Mariya Liver	100 m breaststroke	1:11.23	37	Did not advance			
Darya Stepanyuk	50 m freestyle	25.70	33	Did not advance			
Daryna Zevina	100 m backstroke	1:00.57	18	Did not advance			
Daryna Zevina	200 m backstroke	2:09.40	9 Q	2:09.70	12	Did not advance	
Hanna Dzerkal; Iryna Hlavnyk; Darya Stepanyuk; Daryna Zevina	4 × 200 m freestyle relay	8:12.67	15	—N/a		Did not advance	

== Synchronized swimming ==
Ukraine has qualified 2 quota places in Synchronized swimming.

Athlete	Event	Technical routine		Free routine (preliminary)			Free routine (final)		
Athlete	Event	Points	Rank	Points	Total (technical + free)	Rank	Points	Total (technical + free)	Rank
Kseniya Sydorenko; Daria Iushko	Duet	92.200	6	92.140	184.340	6 Q	92.670	184.870	6

== Table tennis ==
Ukraine has qualified the following athletes

Athlete	Event	Preliminary round	Round 1	Round 2	Round 3	Round 4	Quarterfinals	Semifinals	Final / BM	
Athlete	Event	Opposition Result	Opposition Result	Opposition Result	Opposition Result	Opposition Result	Opposition Result	Opposition Result	Opposition Result	Rank
Oleksandr Didukh	Men's singles	Bye	Aguirre (PAR); W 4–3	Chen W (AUT); L 0–4	Did not advance					
Yaroslav Zhmudenko	Men's singles	Bye	Assar (EGY); L 1–4	Did not advance						
Tetyana Bilenko	Women's singles	Bye	Medina (COL); W 4–1	Dodean (ROU); L 3–4	Did not advance					
Margaryta Pesotska	Women's singles	Bye		Ramírez (ESP); W 4–1	Li J (NED); L 0–4	Did not advance				

== Taekwondo ==
Ukraine has qualified 2 athletes.

Athlete	Event	Round of 16	Quarterfinals	Semifinals	Repechage	Bronze medal	Final	
Athlete	Event	Opposition Result	Opposition Result	Opposition Result	Opposition Result	Opposition Result	Opposition Result	Rank
Hryhorii Husarov	Men's −68 kg	Campbell (NZL); W 10–6	Tazegül (TUR); L 2–9	Did not advance	Jennings (USA); L 2–3	Did not advance		
Maryna Konieva	Women's +67 kg	Dawani (JOR); W 18–13	Hernández (CUB); L 2–16 PTG	Did not advance				

== Tennis ==
Athlete	Event	Round of 64	Round of 32	Round of 16	Quarterfinals	Semifinals	Final / BM	
Athlete	Event	Opposition Score	Opposition Score	Opposition Score	Opposition Score	Opposition Score	Opposition Score	Rank
Sergiy Stakhovsky	Men's singles	Hewitt (AUS); L 3–6, 6–4, 3–6	Did not advance					
Kateryna Bondarenko	Women's singles	Kvitová (CZE); L 4–6, 7–5, 4–6	Did not advance					

== Triathlon ==
Ukraine has qualified the following athletes.

Athlete	Event	Swim (1.5 km)	Trans 1	Bike (40 km)	Trans 2	Run (10 km)	Total Time	Rank
Danylo Sapunov	Men's	18:08	0:42	59:35	0:29	32:38	1:51:32	42
Yuliya Yelistratova	Women's	20:50	0:46	Lapped				

== Weightlifting ==
Ukraine has qualified 6 men and 3 women.

Men

Athlete	Event	Snatch		Clean & jerk		Total	Rank
Athlete	Event	Result	Rank	Result	Rank	Total	Rank
Artem Ivanov	−94 kg	Withdrew					
Kostyantyn Piliyev	−94 kg	166	13	206	12	372	12
Serhiy Tahirov	−105 kg	174	10	200	11	374	10
Oleksiy Torokhtiy	−105 kg	185	4	227	1	412	DSQ*
Ihor Shymechko	+105 kg	197	5	232	6	429	6
Artem Udachyn	+105 kg	Did not compete					

Women

Athlete	Event	Snatch		Clean & jerk		Total	Rank
Athlete	Event	Result	Rank	Result	Rank	Total	Rank
Yuliya Paratova	−53 kg	91	4	108	10	199	3rd place, bronze medalist(s)
Yuliya Kalina	−58 kg	106	2	129	5	235	DSQ*
Svitlana Cherniavska	+75 kg	Withdrew					

* On 13 July 2016, IOC announced that Yuliya Kalina has been disqualified and ordered to return the bronze medal from the 58 kg weightlifting event.
* On 19 December 2019, IOC announced that Oleksiy Torokhtiy has been disqualified and ordered to return the gold medal from the 105 kg weightlifting event.

== Wrestling ==
Ukraine has qualified in the following events

Key:
- VT - Victory by Fall.
- PP - Decision by Points - the loser with technical points.
- PO - Decision by Points - the loser without technical points.

Men's freestyle

Athlete	Event	Qualification	Round of 16	Quarterfinal	Semifinal	Repechage 1	Repechage 2	Final / BM	
Athlete	Event	Opposition Result	Opposition Result	Opposition Result	Opposition Result	Opposition Result	Opposition Result	Opposition Result	Rank
Vasyl Fedoryshyn	−60 kg	Bye	Zarkua (GEO); L 0–3 ^{PO}	Did not advance					17
Andriy Kvyatkovskyy	−66 kg	Bye	Tanatarov (KAZ); L 1–3 ^{PP}	Did not advance					13
Ibragim Aldatov	−84 kg	Sokhiev (UZB); W 3–1 ^{PO}	Urishev (RUS); L 1–3 ^{PO}	Did not advance					9
Valerii Andriitsev	−96 kg	Bye	Iskandari (TJK); W 3–1 ^{PP}	Gazyumov (AZE); W 3–1 ^{PP}	Yazdani (IRI); W 5–0 ^{VB}	Bye		Varner (USA); L 0–3 ^{PO}	2nd place, silver medalist(s)
Oleksandr Khotsianivskyi	−120 kg	Akgül (TUR); L 0–3 ^{PO}	Did not advance						14

Men's Greco-Roman

Athlete	Event	Qualification	Round of 16	Quarterfinal	Semifinal	Repechage 1	Repechage 2	Final / BM	
Athlete	Event	Opposition Result	Opposition Result	Opposition Result	Opposition Result	Opposition Result	Opposition Result	Opposition Result	Rank
Vyugar Ragymov	−55 kg	Li Sj (CHN); L 1–3 ^{PP}	Did not advance						13
Lenur Temirov	−60 kg	Kebispayev (KAZ); L 0–3 ^{PO}	Did not advance						18
Vasyl Rachyba	−84 kg	Bye	Achouri (TUN); W 3–0 ^{PO}	Gegeshidze (GEO); L 1–3 ^{PP}	Did not advance				8
Yevhen Orlov	−120 kg	Bye	Kayaalp (TUR); L 0–3 ^{PO}	Did not advance					18

Women's freestyle

Athlete	Event	Qualification	Round of 16	Quarterfinal	Semifinal	Repechage 1	Repechage 2	Final / BM	
Athlete	Event	Opposition Result	Opposition Result	Opposition Result	Opposition Result	Opposition Result	Opposition Result	Opposition Result	Rank
Irini Merleni	−48 kg	Bye	Kim H-J (KOR); W 3–0 ^{PO}	Caripá (VEN); W 5–0 ^{VT}	Stadnik (AZE); L 0–3 ^{PO}	Bye		Chun (USA); L 0–3 ^{PO}	5
Tetyana Lazareva	−55 kg	Bye	Sayed (EGY); W 5–0 ^{VT}	Verbeek (CAN); L 0–3 ^{PO}	Did not advance	Bye	Geeta (IND); W 3–0 ^{PO}	Rentería (COL); L 1–3 ^{PP}	5
Yuliya Ostapchuk	−63 kg	Shalygina (KAZ); W 3–0 ^{PO}	Sastin (HUN); W 3–0 ^{PO}	Volosova (RUS); L 0–3 ^{PO}	Did not advance				7
Kateryna Burmistrova	−72 kg	Bye	Vorobieva (RUS); L 0–3 ^{PO}	Did not advance		Manyurova (KAZ); L 0–3 ^{PO}	Did not advance		13

== Uniforms ==
The uniforms worn at the opening and closing ceremonies by Ukraine's Olympic athletes were designed by a Russian firm Bosco, the same firm that designed the uniforms for the athletes of the Russian Federation and Spain.

Ukrainian athletes wore Bosco uniforms for the first time at the 2008 Summer Olympics in Beijing. The same firm is expected to design the uniforms for Ukraine's Olympic team at the 2014 Winter Olympics in Sochi and the 2016 Summer Olympics in Rio de Janeiro. The uniforms are provided free of charge to the team members.

The style is of the early 1970s in patterns and colors that reflect the culture of freedom-loving Ukraine. For men, bell-bottoms, colorful shirts with pointed collars single-breasted jackets with wide lapels, and traditional hats. For women capri pants, tunics and short vests, colorful scarves and fringed bags. The design incorporates the blue and yellow colors of the Ukrainian flag and a stylized shaft of wheat, the traditional national symbol of Ukraine.
