= 2013 European Wrestling Championships – Men's Greco-Roman 84 kg =

The men's Greco-Roman 84 kg is a competition featured at the 2013 European Wrestling Championships, and was held at the Tbilisi Sports Palace in Tbilisi, Georgia on 24 March 2013.

== Medalists ==
Gold	Aleksey Mishin; Russia
Silver	Vladimer Gegeshidze; Georgia
Bronze	Artur Shahinyan; Armenia
Bronze	Nenad Zugaj; Croatia

== Results ==
Legend

- D — Disqualified
- F — Won by fall

=== Final ===
Final
Vladimer Gegeshidze (GEO)	0	2	0^{D}
Aleksey Mishin (RUS)	1	0	3

=== Top half ===
Round of 32
Péter Bácsi (HUN)	4	6
Michael Wagner (AUT)	0	0
Artur Shahinyan (ARM)	0	3	3
Damian Janikowski (POL)	6	0	0

Round of 16
Artur Omarov (CZE)	0	0
Hristo Marinov (BUL)	2	2
Adrian Mocanu (MDA)	0	0
Vladimer Gegeshidze (GEO)	1	6
Ramsin Azizsir (GER)	1	1	0
Antti Hakala (FIN)	0	5	4^{F}
Péter Bácsi (HUN)	1	1
Artur Shahinyan (ARM)	4	4

Quarterfinals
Hristo Marinov (BUL)	0	0
Vladimer Gegeshidze (GEO)	2	1
Antti Hakala (FIN)	0	0
Artur Shahinyan (ARM)	1	9

Semifinals
Vladimer Gegeshidze (GEO)	5^{F}
Artur Shahinyan (ARM)	0

=== Bottom half ===
Round of 32
Rasmus Tjørstad (NOR)	0	2	0
Samba Diong (FRA)	3	0	2
Ilias Bouki (GRE)	0	0
Fisnik Zahiti (SWE)	1	1
Saman Tahmasebi (AZE)	0	0
Aleksey Mishin (RUS)	1	3
Rafael Samurgashev (MNE)	1	0	0
Dorin Pîrvan (ROU)	0	2	1
Nenad Zugaj (CRO)	1	3
Máté Hencz (SVK)	0	0
Javid Hamzatau (BLR)	0	1	0
Selçuk Çebi (TUR)	1	0	1
Fabio Parisi (ITA)	1	0	0
Eerik Aps (EST)	0	1	1
Zhan Beleniuk (UKR)	1	2
Aleksandr Kazakevič (LTU)	0	0^{D}

Round of 16
Samba Diong (FRA)	0	1
Fisnik Zahiti (SWE)	3	3
Aleksey Mishin (RUS)	1	1
Dorin Pîrvan (ROU)	0	0
Nenad Zugaj (CRO)	0	1	1
Selçuk Çebi (TUR)	1	0	0
Eerik Aps (EST)	0	0
Zhan Beleniuk (UKR)	1	2

Quarterfinals
Fisnik Zahiti (SWE)	0	0
Aleksey Mishin (RUS)	1	1
Nenad Zugaj (CRO)	0	1	1
Zhan Beleniuk (UKR)	1	0	0

Semifinals
Aleksey Mishin (RUS)	4	3^{F}
Nenad Zugaj (CRO)	0	0

=== Repechage ===
Repechage round 1
Saman Tahmasebi (AZE)	1	4
Dorin Pîrvan (ROU)	0	1

Repechage round 2
Adrian Mocanu (MDA)	0	0
Hristo Marinov (BUL)	1	2
Saman Tahmasebi (AZE)	0	1	1
Fisnik Zahiti (SWE)	1	0	0

Bronze medals
Hristo Marinov (BUL)	0	0
Artur Shahinyan (ARM)	1	3
Saman Tahmasebi (AZE)	3	0	0
Nenad Zugaj (CRO)	0	1	1
