= Wrestling at the 2012 Summer Olympics – Men's Greco-Roman 84 kg =

Men's Greco-Roman 84 kg at the Games of the XXX Olympiad
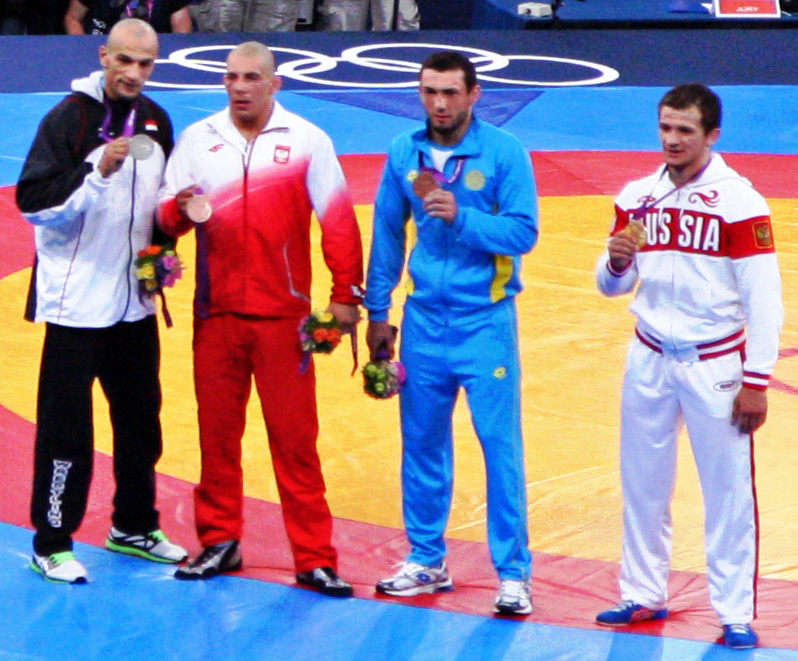
- Venue: ExCeL London
- Date: 6 August 2012
- Competitors: 20 from 20 nations

Medalists
1st place, gold medalist(s)		Alan Khugaev	Russia
2nd place, silver medalist(s)		Karam Gaber	Egypt
3rd place, bronze medalist(s)		Daniyal Gadzhiyev	Kazakhstan
3rd place, bronze medalist(s)		Damian Janikowski	Poland

Men's Greco-Roman 84 kilograms competition at the 2012 Summer Olympics in London, United Kingdom, took place on 6 August at ExCeL London. This Greco-Roman wrestling competition consists of a single-elimination tournament, with a repechage used to determine the winner of two bronze medals. The two finalists face off for gold and silver medals. Each wrestler who loses to one of the two finalists moves into the repechage, culminating in a pair of bronze medal matches featuring the semifinal losers each facing the remaining repechage opponent from their half of the bracket.

Each bout consists of up to three rounds, lasting two minutes apiece. The wrestler who scores more points in each round is the winner of that round; the bout ends when one wrestler has won two rounds (and thus the match).

== Schedule ==
All times are British Summer Time (UTC+01:00)

Date	Time	Event
6 August 2012	13:00	Qualification rounds
6 August 2012	17:45	Repechage
6 August 2012	18:30	Finals

== Results ==
Legend

- F — Won by fall

=== Final ===
Final
Alan Khugaev (RUS)	1	2
Karam Gaber (EGY)	0	0

=== Top half ===
Qualifications

1/8 finals
Vladimer Gegeshidze (GEO)	2	0	1
Saman Tahmasebi (AZE)	0	3	0
Vasyl Rachyba (UKR)	2	1
Haykel Achouri (TUN)	0	0
Alan Khugaev (RUS)	1	1
Alim Selimau (BLR)	0	0
Hristo Marinov (BUL)	0	0
Daniyal Gadzhiyev (KAZ)	1	3

1/4 finals
Vladimer Gegeshidze (GEO)	2	0	1
Vasyl Rachyba (UKR)	1	3	0
Alan Khugaev (RUS)	1	3
Daniyal Gadzhiyev (KAZ)	0	0

Semifinals
Vladimer Gegeshidze (GEO)	1	0
Alan Khugaev (RUS)	3	3

=== Bottom half ===
Qualifications
Keitani Graham (FSM)	0	0
Chas Betts (USA)	6	1
Pablo Shorey (CUB)	0	1	1
Habibollah Akhlaghi (IRI)	1	0	0
Amer Hrustanović (AUT)	3	1
Lee Se-yeol (KOR)	0	0
Damian Janikowski (POL)	2	1
Nazmi Avluca (TUR)	0	0

1/8 finals
Karam Gaber (EGY)	2	0	1
Nenad Žugaj (CRO)	0	1	0
Mélonin Noumonvi (FRA)	2	1
Rami Hietaniemi (FIN)	0	0
Chas Betts (USA)	0	0
Pablo Shorey (CUB)	1	1
Amer Hrustanović (AUT)	0	0
Damian Janikowski (POL)	2	3

1/4 finals
Karam Gaber (EGY)	2	0	2
Mélonin Noumonvi (FRA)	0	3	0
Pablo Shorey (CUB)	1	0
Damian Janikowski (POL)	0	5^{F}

Semifinals
Karam Gaber (EGY)	2	1	4
Damian Janikowski (POL)	3	0	0

=== Repechage ===
Repechage round 2
Alim Selimau (BLR)	0	3	0
Daniyal Gadzhiyev (KAZ)	1	0	3
Nenad Žugaj (CRO)	0	0
Mélonin Noumonvi (FRA)	1	2

Bronze medals
Daniyal Gadzhiyev (KAZ)	0	1	2
Vladimer Gegeshidze (GEO)	1	0	0
Mélonin Noumonvi (FRA)	0	0
Damian Janikowski (POL)	1	1

== Final standing ==
Rank	Athlete
1st place, gold medalist(s)	Alan Khugaev (RUS)
2nd place, silver medalist(s)	Karam Gaber (EGY)
3rd place, bronze medalist(s)	Daniyal Gadzhiyev (KAZ)
3rd place, bronze medalist(s)	Damian Janikowski (POL)
5	Vladimer Gegeshidze (GEO)
5	Mélonin Noumonvi (FRA)
7	Pablo Shorey (CUB)
8	Vasyl Rachyba (UKR)
9	Chas Betts (USA)
10	Amer Hrustanović (AUT)
11	Saman Tahmasebi (AZE)
12	Alim Selimau (BLR)
13	Habibollah Akhlaghi (IRI)
14	Nenad Žugaj (CRO)
15	Rami Hietaniemi (FIN)
15	Nazmi Avluca (TUR)
15	Haykel Achouri (TUN)
18	Lee Se-yeol (KOR)
18	Hristo Marinov (BUL)
20	Keitani Graham (FSM)
