= 2011 European Wrestling Championships =

2011 European Championships
- Host city: Dortmund, Germany
- Dates: 29 March - 3 April

Champions
- Freestyle: Russia
- Greco-Roman: Russia
- Women: Ukraine

The 2011 FILA European Wrestling Championships were held in Dortmund, Germany, from 29 March to 3 April 2011.

== Medal table ==
* Host nation (Germany)

Rank	Nation	Gold	Silver	Bronze	Total
1	Russia	6	2	5	13
2	Azerbaijan	6	0	8	14
3	Ukraine	4	3	3	10
4	Belarus	1	2	3	6
5	Armenia	1	2	2	5
6	Georgia	1	2	1	4
7	Turkey	1	1	1	3
8	Sweden	1	0	0	1
9	Bulgaria	0	3	4	7
10	Hungary	0	2	3	5
11	Romania	0	2	2	4
12	Moldova	0	1	2	3
13	Albania	0	1	0	1
14	Poland	0	0	3	3
15	Germany*	0	0	2	2
16	France	0	0	1	1
16	Great Britain	0	0	1	1
16	Serbia	0	0	1	1
Totals (18 entries)		21	21	42	84

== Team ranking ==
Rank	Men's freestyle		Men's Greco-Roman		Women's freestyle	
Rank	Team	Points	Team	Points	Team	Points
1	Russia	59	Russia	44	Ukraine	59
2	Azerbaijan	50	Azerbaijan	42	Azerbaijan	43
3	Georgia	40	Armenia	41	Romania	32
4	Belarus	29	Hungary	34	Russia	31
5	Turkey	27	Bulgaria	31	Poland	29
6	Bulgaria	27	Turkey	30	Belarus	27
7	Hungary	23	Belarus	23	Germany	23
8	Germany	22	Georgia	20	Latvia	22
9	Ukraine	20	Ukraine	19	Bulgaria	19
10	Romania	18	Romania	13	France	18

== Medal summary ==
=== Men's freestyle ===
Event	Gold	Silver	Bronze
55 kg	Djamal Otarsultanov; Russia	Vladimer Khinchegashvili; Georgia	Uladzislau Andreyeu; Belarus
55 kg	Djamal Otarsultanov; Russia	Vladimer Khinchegashvili; Georgia	Mahmud Magomedov; Azerbaijan
60 kg	Opan Sat; Russia	Sahit Prizreni; Albania	Anatolie Guidea; Bulgaria
60 kg	Opan Sat; Russia	Sahit Prizreni; Albania	Vasyl Fedoryshyn; Ukraine
66 kg	Jabrayil Hasanov; Azerbaijan	Leonid Bazan; Bulgaria	Adam Batirov; Russia
66 kg	Jabrayil Hasanov; Azerbaijan	Leonid Bazan; Bulgaria	Saba Bolaghi; Germany
74 kg	Denis Tsargush; Russia	Musa Murtazaliev; Armenia	Gábor Hatos; Hungary
74 kg	Denis Tsargush; Russia	Musa Murtazaliev; Armenia	Davit Khutsishvili; Georgia
84 kg	Anzor Urishev; Russia	Dato Marsagishvili; Georgia	Sharif Sharifov; Azerbaijan
84 kg	Anzor Urishev; Russia	Dato Marsagishvili; Georgia	Gheorghita Stefan; Romania
96 kg	Khetag Gazyumov; Azerbaijan	Vladislav Baitcaev; Russia	Pavlo Oliinyk; Ukraine
96 kg	Khetag Gazyumov; Azerbaijan	Vladislav Baitcaev; Russia	Nicolai Ceban; Moldova
120 kg	Fatih Çakıroğlu; Turkey	Alexei Shemarov; Belarus	Dániel Ligeti; Hungary
120 kg	Fatih Çakıroğlu; Turkey	Alexei Shemarov; Belarus	Jamaladdin Magomedov; Azerbaijan

=== Men's Greco-Roman ===
Event	Gold	Silver	Bronze
55 kg	Roman Amoyan; Armenia	Vugar Rakhimov; Ukraine	Elbek Tazhyieu; Belarus
55 kg	Roman Amoyan; Armenia	Vugar Rakhimov; Ukraine	Eldaniz Azizli; Azerbaijan
60 kg	Revaz Lashkhi; Georgia	Ivo Angelov; Bulgaria	Mustafa Sağlam; Turkey
60 kg	Revaz Lashkhi; Georgia	Ivo Angelov; Bulgaria	Hasan Aliyev; Azerbaijan
66 kg	Ambako Vachadze; Russia	Tamás Lőrincz; Hungary	Vitaliy Rahimov; Azerbaijan
66 kg	Ambako Vachadze; Russia	Tamás Lőrincz; Hungary	Aleksandar Maksimović; Serbia
74 kg	Rafig Huseynov; Azerbaijan	Péter Bácsi; Hungary	Roman Vlasov; Russia
74 kg	Rafig Huseynov; Azerbaijan	Péter Bácsi; Hungary	Christophe Guenot; France
84 kg	Vasyl Rachyba; Ukraine	Alan Khugaev; Russia	Artur Shahinyan; Armenia
84 kg	Vasyl Rachyba; Ukraine	Alan Khugaev; Russia	Hristo Marinov; Bulgaria
96 kg	Tsimafei Dzeinichenka; Belarus	Artur Aleksanyan; Armenia	Shalva Gadabadze; Azerbaijan
96 kg	Tsimafei Dzeinichenka; Belarus	Artur Aleksanyan; Armenia	Elis Guri; Bulgaria
120 kg	Khasan Baroev; Russia	Rıza Kayaalp; Turkey	Yury Patrikeyev; Armenia
120 kg	Khasan Baroev; Russia	Rıza Kayaalp; Turkey	Mihály Deák-Bárdos; Hungary

=== Women's freestyle ===
Event	Gold	Silver	Bronze
48 kg	Mariya Stadnik; Azerbaijan	Khrystyna Daranutsa; Ukraine	Iwona Matkowska; Poland
48 kg	Mariya Stadnik; Azerbaijan	Khrystyna Daranutsa; Ukraine	Cristina Croitoru; Romania
51 kg	Yuliya Blahinya; Ukraine	*Estera Dobre; Romania	Natalia Budu; Moldova
51 kg	Yuliya Blahinya; Ukraine	*Estera Dobre; Romania	*Ekaterina Krasnova; Russia
55 kg	Ida-Theres Nerell; Sweden	Ludmila Cristea; Moldova	Maria Gurova; Russia
55 kg	Ida-Theres Nerell; Sweden	Ludmila Cristea; Moldova	Katarzyna Krawczyk; Poland
59 kg	Yuliya Ratkevich; Azerbaijan	Georgiana Paic; Romania	Olga Butkevych; Great Britain
59 kg	Yuliya Ratkevich; Azerbaijan	Georgiana Paic; Romania	Ganna Vasylenko; Ukraine
63 kg	Yuliya Ostapchuk; Ukraine	Taybe Yusein; Bulgaria	Inna Trazhukova; Russia
63 kg	Yuliya Ostapchuk; Ukraine	Taybe Yusein; Bulgaria	Olesya Zamula; Azerbaijan
67 kg	Nadya Sementsova; Azerbaijan	Alina Makhynia; Ukraine	Yvonne Englich; Germany
67 kg	Nadya Sementsova; Azerbaijan	Alina Makhynia; Ukraine	Hanna Savenia; Belarus
72 kg	Kateryna Burmistrova; Ukraine	Vasilisa Marzaliuk; Belarus	Stanka Zlateva; Bulgaria
72 kg	Kateryna Burmistrova; Ukraine	Vasilisa Marzaliuk; Belarus	Agnieszka Wieszczek; Poland
