= Artur Shahinyan =

Armenian Greco-Roman wrestler

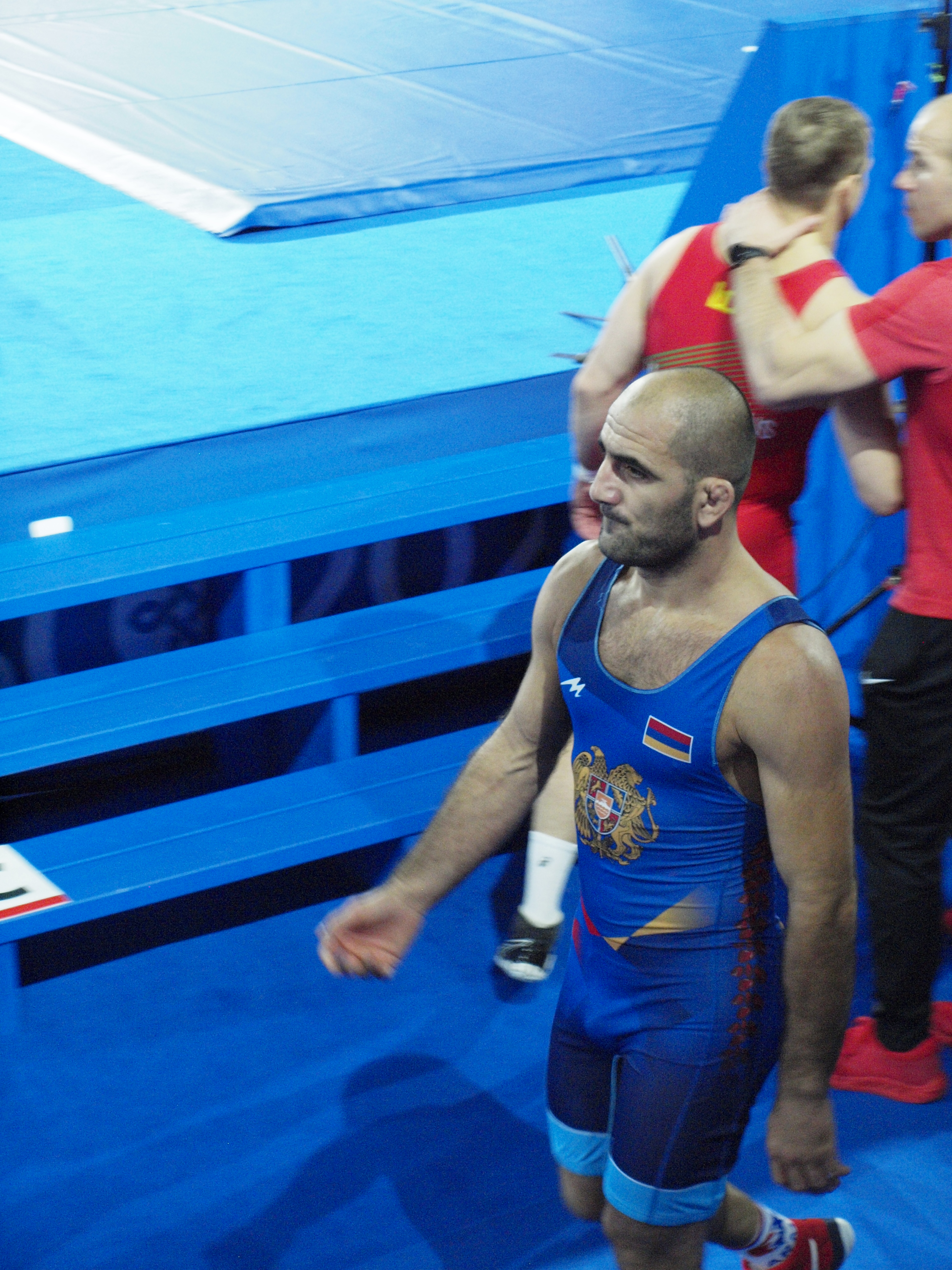

Personal information
- Born: 8 January 1987 (age 39) Armenia
- Height: 1.80 m (5 ft 11 in)
- Weight: 87 kg (192 lb)

Sport
- Sport: Wrestling
- Event: Greco-Roman
- Club: Sevan Echmiadzin
- Coached by: Artur Tolmasian; Armen Babalaryan
Medal record
Men's Greco-Roman wrestling
Representing Armenia
World Championships
Bronze medal – third place	2018 Budapest	87 kg
European Championships
Bronze medal – third place	2011 Dortmund	84 kg
Bronze medal – third place	2013 Tbilisi	84 kg

Artur Shahinyan (Armenian: Արթուր Շահինյան, born 8 January 1987) is an Armenian Greco-Roman wrestler.

Shahinyan won a bronze medal at the 2011 European Wrestling Championships in Dortmund. He won another bronze medal at the 2013 European Wrestling Championships in Tbilisi. Also Shahinyan won a bronze medal at the 2018 World Wrestling Championships in Budapest.

In March 2021, he competed at the European Qualification Tournament in Budapest, Hungary hoping to qualify for the 2020 Summer Olympics in Tokyo, Japan.
