= Pablo Shorey =

Cuban wrestler (born 1983)

Personal information
- Born: December 4, 1983 (age 42) Camagüey, Cuba

Sport
- Sport: Greco-Roman wrestling
Medal record
Men's Greco-Roman wrestling
Representing Cuba
World Championships
Silver medal – second place	2010 Moscow	84 kg
Bronze medal – third place	2009 Herning	84 kg
Pan American Games
Gold medal – first place	2011 Guadalajara	84kg

Pablo Enrique Shorey Hernandez (born December 4, 1983) is a male wrestler from Cuba. He competed at the 2012 Summer Olympics in the men's Greco-Roman 84 kg.
