= Aleksey Mishin (wrestler) =

Russian wrestler

Aleksey Vladimirovich Mishin Алексей Владимирович Мишин
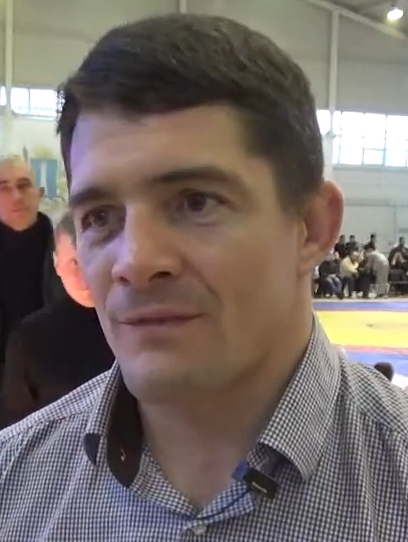
- Mishin in 2017

Personal information
- Nationality: (Mordovia) Mordvin
- Citizenship: (Russia) Russian
- Born: February 8, 1979 (age 47) Ruzayevka, Mordovian ASSR, Soviet Union
- Home town: Saransk, Russia
- Height: 1.77 m (5 ft 10 in)
- Weight: 85 kg (187 lb)

Sport
- Country: Russia
- Sport: Wrestling
- Event: Greco-Roman
- Club: Aleksey Mishin Wrestling Academy
- Coached by: Yuiri Kuzin, Alexander Tarakanov
Medal record
Representing Russia
Men's Greco-Roman wrestling
Olympic Games
| Gold medal – first place | 2004 Athens | 84 kg |
World Championships
| Gold medal – first place | 2007 Baku | 84 kg |
| Silver medal – second place | 2001 Patras | 76 kg |
| Silver medal – second place | 2005 Budapest | 84 kg |
| Bronze medal – third place | 2006 Guangzhou | 84 kg |
| Bronze medal – third place | 2010 Moscow | 84 kg |
European Championships
| Gold medal – first place | 2001 Istanbul | 76 kg |
| Gold medal – first place | 2003 Belgrade | 84 kg |
| Gold medal – first place | 2005 Varna | 84 kg |
| Gold medal – first place | 2007 Sofia | 84 kg |
| Gold medal – first place | 2009 Vilnius | 84 kg |
| Silver medal – second place | 2010 Baku | 84 kg |
| Gold medal – first place | 2013 Tbilisi | 84 kg |

Aleksey Vladimirovich Mishin (Russian: Алексе́й Влади́мирович Ми́шин; born February 8, 1979 in Ruzayevka) is a Russian former wrestler.

== Career ==
Mishin won a gold medal in Greco-Roman wrestling, 84 kg division, at the 2004 Summer Olympics. He was also the 2007 world champion and 2001, 2003, 2005, and 2006 European champion.

== Personal life ==
Mishin dated world champion and Olympic medalist in fencing Sofia Velikaya from 2008 to 2017. They have two children together, a son, named Oleg, born on November 30, 2013, and a daughter Zoya.
