= Vladimer Gegeshidze =

Georgian Greco-Roman wrestler

Personal information
- Full name: Vladimer Gegeshidze
- Nationality: Georgia
- Born: 10 February 1985 (age 41) Tbilisi, Georgian SSR, Soviet Union
- Height: 1.90 m (6 ft 3 in)
- Weight: 84 kg (185 lb)

Sport
- Style: Greco-Roman
- Club: Sport Club Tbilisi
- Coach: Otari Tateshvili
Medal record
Men's Greco-Roman wrestling
Representing Georgia
European Championships
Silver medal – second place	2013 Tbilisi	84 kg

Vladimer Gegeshidze (Georgian: ვლადიმერ გეგეშიძე; born February 10, 1985, in Tbilisi) is an amateur Georgian Greco-Roman wrestler, who competes in the men's light heavyweight category. He won a silver medal in the same weight division at the 2013 European Wrestling Championships, coincidentally held in his home city Tbilisi, losing out to Russian wrestler and former Olympic champion Alexei Mishin.

Gegeshidze represented Georgia at the 2012 Summer Olympics in London, where he competed in the men's 84 kg class. He defeated Azerbaijan's Saman Tahmasebi and Ukraine's Vasyl Rachyba in the preliminary rounds, before losing out the semi-final match to Russia's Alan Khugayev, who was able to score three points each in two straight periods, leaving Gegeshidze with a single point. Because Khugayev advanced further into the final round against Egyptian wrestler and former Olympic champion Karam Gaber, Gegeshidze automatically qualified for the bronze medal match, where he was defeated by Kazakhstan's Daniyal Gadzhiyev, with a three-set technical score (1–0, 0–1, 0–2), and a classification point score of 1–3.
