= Vasyl Rachyba =

Ukrainian Greco-Roman wrestler

Personal information
- Full name: Vasyl Dmyrovych Rachyba
- Nationality: Ukraine
- Born: 27 January 1982 (age 44) Dolyna Raion, Ivano-Frankivsk Oblast, Ukrainian SSR, Soviet Union
- Height: 1.75 m (5 ft 9 in)
- Weight: 88 kg (194 lb)

Sport
- Sport: Wrestling
- Event: Greco-Roman
- Club: CSKA Kyiv
- Coached by: Yury Tsikolenko
Medal record
Men's Greco-Roman wrestling
Representing Ukraine
European Championships
Gold medal – first place	2011 Dortmund	84 kg
Silver medal – second place	2004 Haparanda	74 kg

Vasyl Dmyrovych Rachyba (Ukrainian: Василь Дмитрович Рачиба; born January 27, 1982, in Dolyna Raion, Ivano-Frankivsk Oblast) is an amateur Ukrainian Greco-Roman wrestler, who played for the men's light heavyweight category. He defeated Russia's Alan Khugayev for the gold medal in his respective division at the 2011 European Wrestling Championships in Dortmund, Germany. Rachyba is also a member of the wrestling team for CSKA Kyiv, and is coached and trained by Yury Tsikolenko.

Rachyba represented Ukraine at the 2012 Summer Olympics in London, where he competed for the men's 84 kg class. He defeated Tunisian wrestler and two-time Olympian Haykel Achouri in the preliminary round of sixteen, before losing out the quarterfinal match to Georgia's Vladimer Gegeshidze, with a three-set technical score (1–2, 3–0, 0–1), and a classification point score of 1–3.
