= Theodoros Tounousidis =

Greek wrestler (born 1984)

Personal information
- Nationality: Greece
- Born: 13 January 1984 (age 42) Stockholm, Sweden
- Height: 1.87 m (6 ft 1 1/2 in)
- Weight: 96 kg (212 lb)

Sport
- Sport: Wrestling
- Event: Greco-Roman
- Club: Spårvägens BK (SWE)
- Coached by: Ryszard Swierad (SWE)
Medal record
Men's Greco-Roman wrestling
Representing Greece
Mediterranean Games
Silver medal – second place	2009 Pescara	96 kg

Theodoros Tounousidis (Greek: Θεόδωρος Τουνουσίδης; born January 13, 1984) is a Swedish-born Greek wrestler who competed for the men's Greco-Roman 96 kg (heavyweight division) at the 2008 Summer Olympics in Beijing. Tounousidis received a bye for the second round, before losing out to Georgia's Ramaz Nozadze, with a technical score of 1–3, and a classification point score of 1–3.

Tounousidis eventually won the silver medal for the heavyweight category at the 2009 Mediterranean Games in Pescara, Italy, losing out to Turkey's Serkan Ozden. He is also a member of Spårvägens BK in Stockholm, Sweden, being coached and trained by Ryszard Swierad. He is fluent in Greek, English, German, and Swedish.
