= Daniyal Gadzhiyev =

Kazakhstani wrestler (born 1986)

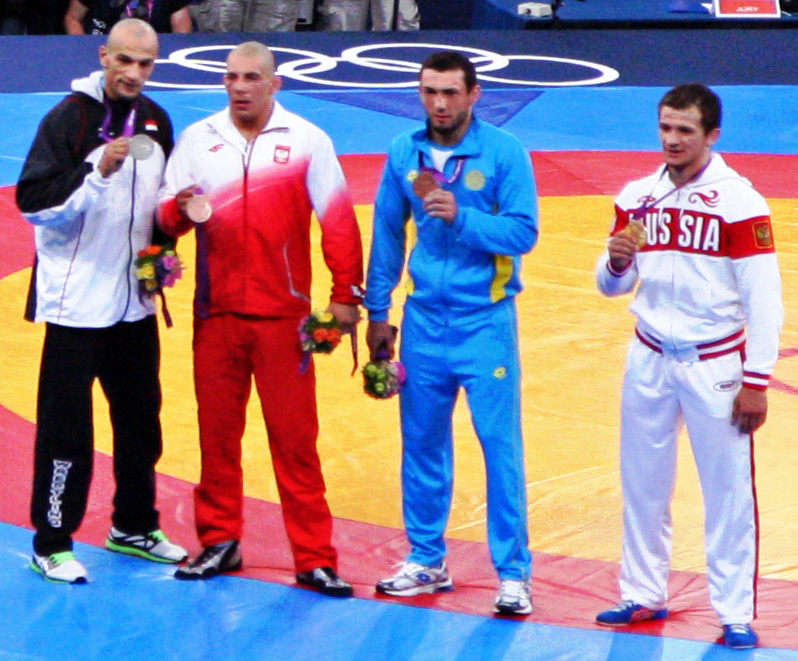
- Gadzhiyev (second R to L) at the 2012 Summer Olympics

Medal record

Men's Greco-Roman wrestling

Representing Kazakhstan

Olympic Games
Bronze medal – third place	2012 London	84 kg

Daniyal Gadzhiyev (born 20 February 1986 in Kizilyurt, Dagestan ASSR, Soviet Union) is a Kazakhstani born-Dagestani wrestler who competes for Republic of Kazakhstan. He won the bronze medal at the 2012 Summer Olympics in the Greco-Roman men's 84 kg event.
