= Nenad Žugaj =

Croatian Greco-Roman wrestler

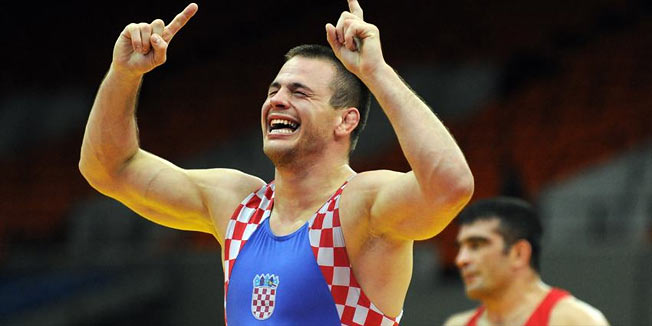
- Nenad Žugaj upon winning the bronze at the World Championship

Medal record

Men's Greco-Roman wrestling

Representing Croatia

World Championships
Bronze medal – third place	2010 Moscow	84 kg

European Championships
Bronze medal – third place	2013 Tbilisi	84 kg

Mediterranean Games
Gold medal – first place	2009 Pescara	84 kg
Bronze medal – third place	2013 Mersin	84 kg

Nenad Žugaj (born 19 April 1983 in Zagreb) is a Croatian Greco-Roman wrestler. He won bronze medals at the 2010 World Championship and 2013 European Championship, as well as gold (2009) and bronze (2013) medal at the Mediterranean Games.

== Biography ==
He attended a sports gymnasium. After graduation, he has been studying at the Faculty of Kinesiology, University of Zagreb. In 2007, he became professor of kinesiology.

In the same year, he enrolled in officer school, becoming a lieutenant of the Croatian Armed Forces.

His twin brother Neven Žugaj is also a Greco-Roman wrestler competing for Croatia.

== Wrestling career ==
He had started wrestling at the age of ten.

In senior competition, Nenad wrestles in the 84 kg Greco-Roman category. His first club was the wrestling club “Hrvatski dragovoljac“ and he is now a member of wrestling club, "Lika".

In Semifinals at the European Games 2015, he was eliminated by Davit Chakvetadze of Russia.

He competed at the 2012 Olympics in Greco-Roman wrestling in the under-84 kg category, winning 14th place.
