= Eerik Aps =

Estonian wrestler (born 1987)

Eerik Aps (born 22 October 1987 in Tallinn) is an Estonian wrestler.

He started wrestling in 1994. He placed 5th at 2017 European Wrestling Championships (men's Greco-Roman 85 kg). He is multiple-times Estonian champion during 2006–2018.
