= Haykel Achouri =

Tunisian Greco-Roman wrestler (born 1984)

Personal information
- Full name: Haykel Al-Achouri
- Nationality: Tunisia
- Born: 29 August 1984 (age 42) Tunis, Tunisia
- Height: 1.86 m (6 ft 1 in)
- Weight: 84 kg (185 lb)

Sport
- Sport: Wrestling
- Event: Greco-Roman
- Coached by: Berberuv Neshu
Medal record
Men's Greco-Roman wrestling
Representing Tunisia
Pan Arab Games
Bronze medal – third place	2011 Doha	84 kg

Haykel Al-Achouri (also Haykel Achouri, Arabic: هيكل العاشوري; born August 29, 1984, in Tunis) is an amateur Tunisian Greco-Roman wrestler, who played for the men's light heavyweight category. He is a multiple-time African wrestling champion, and a bronze medalist for his division at the 2011 Pan Arab Games in Doha, Qatar.

Achouri represented Tunisia at the 2008 Summer Olympics in Beijing, where he competed for the men's 84 kg class. He received a bye for the preliminary round of sixteen match, before losing out to Azerbaijan's Shalva Gadabadze, who was able to score five points each in two straight periods, leaving Achouri without a single point.

At the 2012 Summer Olympics in London, Achouri, however, lost again in the second preliminary match of men's 84 kg class to Ukraine's Vasyl Rachyba, with a technical score of 0–3.

He competed at the 2020 Summer Olympics. He competed in the men's 97 kg event.
