= Hristo Marinov =

Bulgarian wrestler

Medal record

Men's Greco-Roman wrestling

Representing Bulgaria

World Championships
Gold medal – first place	2010 Moscow	84 kg

European Championships
Bronze medal – third place	2011 Dortmund	84 kg
Gold medal – first place	2012 Belgrade	84 kg

Hristo Marinov (born March 14, 1987, Stara Zagora) is a male wrestler from Bulgaria. He competes in men's -84 kg Greco-Roman wrestling.

At the 2012 Summer Olympics he was knocked out after his first match which he lost to Kazakh wrestler Daniyal Gadzhiyev.
