= Alan Khugaev =

Russian wrestler (born 1989)

Alan Khugaev Алан Хугаев
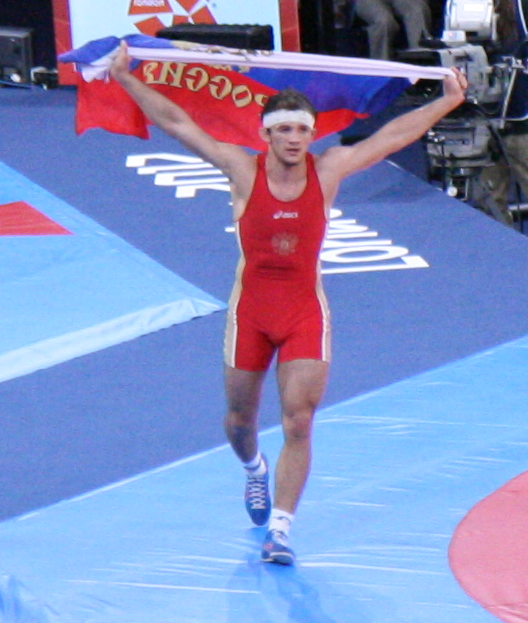
- Khugaev at the 2012 Olympics.

Personal information
- Born: 27 April 1989 (age 37) Vladikavkaz, Russian SFSR, Soviet Union
Medal record
Men's Greco-Roman wrestling
Representing Russia
Olympic Games
Gold medal – first place	2012 London	84 kg
Summer Universiade
Gold medal – first place	2013 Kazan	84 kg
European Championships
Silver medal – second place	2011 Dortmund	84 kg
Representing North Ossetia–Alania
Russian Wrestling Championships
Gold medal – first place	2019 Krasnodar Krai	125 kg

Alan Anatolyevich Khugaev (Russian: Алан Анатольевич Хугаев, Iron Ossetic: Хуыгаты Анатолийы фырт Алан);born 27 April 1989 in Vladikavkaz) is a Russian wrestler of Ossetian origin. He won the gold medal at the 2012 Summer Olympics in the Greco-Roman men's 84 kg event. After retiring from competing, Khugaev was appointed the U23 Greco-Roman coach for the Russian national team.
