= 2013 World Wrestling Championships – Men's Greco-Roman 96 kg =

Men's Greco-Roman 96 kg at the 2013 World Championships
- Venue: László Papp Budapest Sports Arena
- Dates: 21 September 2013
- Competitors: 37 from 37 nations

Medalists
gold medal	Nikita Melnikov	Russia
silver medal	Artur Aleksanyan	Armenia
bronze medal	Balázs Kiss	Hungary
bronze medal	Shalva Gadabadze	Azerbaijan

The men's Greco-Roman 96 kilograms was a competition at the 2013 World Wrestling Championships, held at the László Papp Budapest Sports Arena in Budapest, Hungary, on 21 September 2013.

== Results ==
Legend

- C — Won by 3 cautions given to the opponent
- F — Won by fall

=== Finals ===
Semifinals		Final
Balázs Kiss (HUN)	1
Artur Aleksanyan (ARM)	9	Artur Aleksanyan (ARM)	2
Shalva Gadabadze (AZE)	0	Nikita Melnikov (RUS)	2
Nikita Melnikov (RUS)	3

=== Top half ===
==== Section 1 ====
Round of 64

Round of 32
Yasmany Lugo (CUB)	0
Balázs Kiss (HUN)	4^{C}
Khabibullo Abdulloev (TJK)	7
Dávid Lengyel (SVK)	14
Kevin Mejía (HON)	2
Robert Avanesyan (ISR)	7
Caylor Williams (USA)	0
Cenk İldem (TUR)	3^{C}

Round of 16
Balázs Kiss (HUN)	6
Dávid Lengyel (SVK)	0
Robert Avanesyan (ISR)	0
Cenk İldem (TUR)	4

Quarterfinals
Balázs Kiss (HUN)	3
Cenk İldem (TUR)	0

==== Section 2 ====
Round of 64

Round of 32
Radosław Grzybicki (POL)	2
Vladislav Metodiev (BUL)	8
Artur Aleksanyan (ARM)	3
Mehdi Aliyari (IRI)	1
Marin Cazac (MDA)	3
Hardeep Singh (IND)	1
Yerulan Iskakov (KAZ)	4^{F}
Oliver Hassler (GER)	4

Round of 16
Vladislav Metodiev (BUL)	0
Artur Aleksanyan (ARM)	8
Marin Cazac (MDA)	3
Yerulan Iskakov (KAZ)	10

Quarterfinals
Artur Aleksanyan (ARM)	7
Yerulan Iskakov (KAZ)	0

=== Bottom half ===
==== Section 3 ====
Round of 64

Round of 32
Dejan Franjković (SRB)	1
Aliaksandr Hrabovik (BLR)	8
Alin Alexuc-Ciurariu (ROU)	3
Yahia Abutabeekh (JOR)	0
Marthin Hamlet Nielsen (NOR)	2
Fredrik Schön (SWE)	0
Shalva Gadabadze (AZE)	5
David Vála (CZE)	0

Round of 16
Aliaksandr Hrabovik (BLR)	1
Alin Alexuc-Ciurariu (ROU)	1
Marthin Hamlet Nielsen (NOR)	0
Shalva Gadabadze (AZE)	1

Quarterfinals
Aliaksandr Hrabovik (BLR)	0
Shalva Gadabadze (AZE)	1

==== Section 4 ====
Round of 64
Norikatsu Saikawa (JPN)	7
Xiao Di (CHN)	0
Nikita Melnikov (RUS)	3
Daigoro Timoncini (ITA)	0
Mélonin Noumonvi (FRA)	7
Konstantinos Vourdanos (GRE)	0
Vasil Imerlishvili (GEO)	5^{C}
Mehdi Abbasi (NED)	0
Dimitriy Timchenko (UKR)	0
Timo Kallio (FIN)	2

Round of 32
Erwin Caraballo (VEN)	3
Lim Ji-young (KOR)	9^{F}
Sukhrob Fattoev (UZB)	0
Norikatsu Saikawa (JPN)	8
Nikita Melnikov (RUS)	7
Mélonin Noumonvi (FRA)	0
Vasil Imerlishvili (GEO)	1
Timo Kallio (FIN)	2

Round of 16
Lim Ji-young (KOR)	1
Norikatsu Saikawa (JPN)	4
Nikita Melnikov (RUS)	8
Timo Kallio (FIN)	0

Quarterfinals
Norikatsu Saikawa (JPN)	4
Nikita Melnikov (RUS)	6

=== Repechage ===
Repechage round 1
Daigoro Timoncini (ITA)	1
Mélonin Noumonvi (FRA)	2

Repechage round 2
Mehdi Aliyari (IRI)	4
Vladislav Metodiev (BUL)	1
Mélonin Noumonvi (FRA)	4
Timo Kallio (FIN)	4

Repechage round 3
Mehdi Aliyari (IRI)	4
Yerulan Iskakov (KAZ)	2
Timo Kallio (FIN)	0
Norikatsu Saikawa (JPN)	1

Bronze medals
Mehdi Aliyari (IRI)	0
Balázs Kiss (HUN)	5
Norikatsu Saikawa (JPN)	1
Shalva Gadabadze (AZE)	2
