= 2017 World Wrestling Championships – Men's Greco-Roman 98 kg =

Men's Greco-Roman 98 kg at the 2017 World Championships
- Venue: AccorHotels Arena
- Dates: 21 August 2017
- Competitors: 33 from 33 nations

Medalists
gold medal	Artur Aleksanyan	Armenia
silver medal	Musa Evloev	Russia
bronze medal	Revaz Nadareishvili	Georgia
bronze medal	Balázs Kiss	Hungary

The men's Greco-Roman 98 kilograms is a competition featured at the 2017 World Wrestling Championships, and was held in Paris, France on 21 August 2017.

== Results ==
Legend

- F — Won by fall

=== Finals ===
Semifinals		Final
Artur Aleksanyan (ARM)	8
Rustam Assakalov (UZB)	0	Artur Aleksanyan (ARM)	3
Dimitriy Timchenko (UKR)	1	Musa Evloev (RUS)	1
Musa Evloev (RUS)	8

=== Top half ===
==== Section 1 ====
Round of 64

Round of 32
Artur Aleksanyan (ARM)	3
Mostafa Salehizadeh (IRI)	1
Fatih Başköy (TUR)	0
G'Angelo Hancock (USA)	3
Artur Omarov (CZE)	3
Revaz Nadareishvili (GEO)	5
Oliver Hassler (GER)	2
Gu Hak-bon (KOR)	3

Round of 16
Artur Aleksanyan (ARM)	10
G'Angelo Hancock (USA)	1
Revaz Nadareishvili (GEO)	4
Gu Hak-bon (KOR)	2

Quarterfinals
Artur Aleksanyan (ARM)	6
Revaz Nadareishvili (GEO)	2

==== Section 2 ====
Round of 64

Round of 32
Laokratis Kesidis (GRE)	14
Reiniel Díaz (CUB)	5
Vilius Laurinaitis (LTU)	5
Hardeep Singh (IND)	2
Felix Baldauf (NOR)	3
Plamen Tashev (BUL)	0
Radosław Grzybicki (POL)	1
Rustam Assakalov (UZB)	2

Round of 16
Laokratis Kesidis (GRE)	1
Vilius Laurinaitis (LTU)	3
Felix Baldauf (NOR)	0
Rustam Assakalov (UZB)	11

Quarterfinals
Vilius Laurinaitis (LTU)	1
Rustam Assakalov (UZB)	3

=== Bottom half ===
==== Section 3 ====
Round of 64

Round of 32
Ardo Arusaar (EST)	9
Zhang Linglong (CHN)	0
Dimitriy Timchenko (UKR)	6
Yuta Nara (JPN)	2
Yerulan Iskakov (KAZ)	6
Mikheil Kajaia (SRB)	6
Elias Kuosmanen (FIN)	4
Daniel Gastl (AUT)	3

Round of 16
Ardo Arusaar (EST)	1
Dimitriy Timchenko (UKR)	1
Mikheil Kajaia (SRB)	3
Elias Kuosmanen (FIN)	3

Quarterfinals
Dimitriy Timchenko (UKR)	8^{F}
Mikheil Kajaia (SRB)	2

==== Section 4 ====
Round of 64
Musa Evloev (RUS)	6
Uzur Dzhuzupbekov (KGZ)	1

Round of 32
Mélonin Noumonvi (FRA)	3
Aliaksandr Hrabovik (BLR)	1
Kevin Mejía (HON)	1
Orkhan Nuriyev (AZE)	6
Choucri Atafi (MAR)	4
Tom Barreiro (CAN)	1
Musa Evloev (RUS)	3
Balázs Kiss (HUN)	1

Round of 16
Mélonin Noumonvi (FRA)	3
Orkhan Nuriyev (AZE)	1
Choucri Atafi (MAR)	0
Musa Evloev (RUS)	9

Quarterfinals
Mélonin Noumonvi (FRA)	1
Musa Evloev (RUS)	2

=== Repechage ===
Repechage round 1
Uzur Dzhuzupbekov (KGZ)	1
Balázs Kiss (HUN)	3

Repechage round 2
Mostafa Salehizadeh (IRI)	3
G'Angelo Hancock (USA)	1
Balázs Kiss (HUN)	4
Choucri Atafi (MAR)	0

Repechage round 3
Mostafa Salehizadeh (IRI)	4
Revaz Nadareishvili (GEO)	4
Balázs Kiss (HUN)	4
Mélonin Noumonvi (FRA)	2

Bronze medals
Revaz Nadareishvili (GEO)	3
Rustam Assakalov (UZB)	1
Balázs Kiss (HUN)	3
Dimitriy Timchenko (UKR)	1
