= 2015 World Wrestling Championships – Men's Greco-Roman 98 kg =

Men's Greco-Roman 98 kg at the 2015 World Championships
- Venue: Orleans Arena
- Dates: 7 September 2015
- Competitors: 36 from 36 nations

Medalists
gold medal	Artur Aleksanyan	Armenia
silver medal	Ghasem Rezaei	Iran
bronze medal	Islam Magomedov	Russia
bronze medal	Dimitriy Timchenko	Ukraine

The men's Greco-Roman 98 kilograms is a competition featured at the 2015 World Wrestling Championships, and was held in Las Vegas, United States on 7 September 2015.

== Results ==
Legend

- F — Won by fall
- WO — Won by walkover

=== Finals ===
Semifinals		Final
Ghasem Rezaei (IRI)	3
Elis Guri (BUL)	0	Ghasem Rezaei (IRI)	0
Artur Aleksanyan (ARM)	9	Artur Aleksanyan (ARM)	3
Alin Alexuc-Ciurariu (ROU)	0

=== Top half ===
==== Section 1 ====
Round of 64

Round of 32
Daigoro Timoncini (ITA)	1
Kevin Mejía (HON)	1
Balázs Kiss (HUN)	4
Cenk İldem (TUR)	4
Tuomas Lahti (FIN)	0
Yasmany Lugo (CUB)	1
Ghasem Rezaei (IRI)	4
Islam Magomedov (RUS)	2

Round of 16
Daigoro Timoncini (ITA)	2
Cenk İldem (TUR)	5
Yasmany Lugo (CUB)	0
Ghasem Rezaei (IRI)	5

Quarterfinals
Cenk İldem (TUR)	0
Ghasem Rezaei (IRI)	4

==== Section 2 ====
Round of 64

Round of 32
Davi Albino (BRA)	5
Caylor Williams (USA)	9^{F}
Elis Guri (BUL)	3
Radosław Grzybicki (POL)	0
Beksultan Makhmudov (KGZ)	2
Ardo Arusaar (EST)	5
Vilius Laurinaitis (LTU)	4
Robert Avanesyan (ISR)	1

Round of 16
Caylor Williams (USA)	4
Elis Guri (BUL)	4
Ardo Arusaar (EST)	0
Vilius Laurinaitis (LTU)	4

Quarterfinals
Elis Guri (BUL)	8
Vilius Laurinaitis (LTU)	3

=== Bottom half ===
==== Section 3 ====
Round of 64

Round of 32
Artur Aleksanyan (ARM)	8
Yasuhiro Yonehira (JPN)	0
Marthin Hamlet Nielsen (NOR)	5
Arslan Saparmämmedow (TKM)	0
Dimitriy Timchenko (UKR)	2
Aliaksandr Hrabovik (BLR)	1
Daniel Gastl (AUT)	4
Mikheil Kajaia (GEO)	5

Round of 16
Artur Aleksanyan (ARM)	4
Marthin Hamlet Nielsen (NOR)	0
Dimitriy Timchenko (UKR)	1
Mikheil Kajaia (GEO)	1

Quarterfinals
Artur Aleksanyan (ARM)	10
Dimitriy Timchenko (UKR)	1

==== Section 4 ====
Round of 64
Orkhan Nuriyev (AZE)	2
Laokratis Kesidis (GRE)	7^{F}
Xiao Di (CHN)	7
Yerulan Iskakov (KAZ)	4
Peter Öhler (GER)	2
Fredrik Schön (SWE)	0
Jeremy LaTour (CAN)	0
An Chang-gun (KOR)	9

Round of 32
Alin Alexuc-Ciurariu (ROU)	8
Luillys Pérez (VEN)	0
Jahongir Turdiev (UZB)	1
Hardeep Singh (IND)	10
Laokratis Kesidis (GRE)	2
Xiao Di (CHN)	7
Peter Öhler (GER)	7
An Chang-gun (KOR)	0

Round of 16
Alin Alexuc-Ciurariu (ROU)	9
Hardeep Singh (IND)	0
Xiao Di (CHN)	4
Peter Öhler (GER)	2

Quarterfinals
Alin Alexuc-Ciurariu (ROU)	2
Xiao Di (CHN)	1

=== Repechage ===
Repechage round 2
Islam Magomedov (RUS)	WO
Yasmany Lugo (CUB)
Yasuhiro Yonehira (JPN)	0
Marthin Hamlet Nielsen (NOR)	8

Repechage round 3
Islam Magomedov (RUS)	8
Cenk İldem (TUR)	0
Marthin Hamlet Nielsen (NOR)	3
Dimitriy Timchenko (UKR)	4

Bronze medals
Islam Magomedov (RUS)	6
Elis Guri (BUL)	2
Dimitriy Timchenko (UKR)	4
Alin Alexuc-Ciurariu (ROU)	2
