= 2014 European Wrestling Championships – Men's Greco-Roman 98 kg =

Wrestling competitions

The Men's Greco-Roman 98 kg is a competition featured at the 2014 European Wrestling Championships, and was held in Vantaa, Finland on 5 April 2014.

== Medalists ==
Gold	Artur Aleksanyan; Armenia
Silver	Cenk İldem; Turkey
Bronze	Fredrik Schön; Sweden
Bronze	Marthin Hamlet Nielsen; Norway

== Results ==
Legend

- C — Won by 3 cautions given to the opponent
- F — Won by fall

=== Final ===
Final
Cenk İldem (TUR)	0
Artur Aleksanyan (ARM)	5

=== Top half ===
Round of 32
Balázs Kiss (HUN)	1
Ardo Arusaar (EST)	0

Round of 16
Vasil Imerlishvili (GEO)	10
Daigoro Timoncini (ITA)	0
Fredrik Schön (SWE)	1
Cenk İldem (TUR)	2
Mélonin Noumonvi (FRA)	3
Robert Avanesyan (ISR)	0
Daniel Gastl (AUT)	8
Balázs Kiss (HUN)	11

Quarterfinals
Vasil Imerlishvili (GEO)	0
Cenk İldem (TUR)	2^{C}
Mélonin Noumonvi (FRA)	9
Balázs Kiss (HUN)	5

Semifinals
Cenk İldem (TUR)	4
Mélonin Noumonvi (FRA)	2

=== Bottom half ===
Round of 32
Shalva Gadabadze (AZE)	0
Aliaksandr Hrabovik (BLR)	2^{C}
Romas Fridrikas (LTU)	1
Vladislav Metodiev (BUL)	4^{C}
Alin Alexuc-Ciurariu (ROU)	3^{C}
Marin Cazac (MDA)	0
Timo Kallio (FIN)	1
Marthin Hamlet Nielsen (NOR)	3
Felix Radinger (GER)	4
Musa Evloev (RUS)	2
Dávid Lengyel (SVK)	8
Spiros Kountouratzis (GRE)	0
Artur Aleksanyan (ARM)	7
Vladimir Vasiliev (UKR)	0
Siniša Hogač (CRO)	14
Timur Khamikoev (MKD)	4

Round of 16
Aliaksandr Hrabovik (BLR)	2
Vladislav Metodiev (BUL)	0
Alin Alexuc-Ciurariu (ROU)	0
Marthin Hamlet Nielsen (NOR)	9
Felix Radinger (GER)	3
Dávid Lengyel (SVK)	0
Artur Aleksanyan (ARM)	8
Siniša Hogač (CRO)	0

Quarterfinals
Aliaksandr Hrabovik (BLR)	0
Marthin Hamlet Nielsen (NOR)	1
Felix Radinger (GER)	0
Artur Aleksanyan (ARM)	9

Semifinals
Marthin Hamlet Nielsen (NOR)	0
Artur Aleksanyan (ARM)	9

=== Repechage ===
Repechage round 1
Vladimir Vasiliev (UKR)	5
Siniša Hogač (CRO)	3

Repechage round 2
Fredrik Schön (SWE)	8
Vasil Imerlishvili (GEO)	0
Vladimir Vasiliev (UKR)	1
Felix Radinger (GER)	3

Bronze medals
Fredrik Schön (SWE)	5
Mélonin Noumonvi (FRA)	1
Felix Radinger (GER)	2
Marthin Hamlet Nielsen (NOR)	8
