= 2011 World Wrestling Championships – Men's Greco-Roman 96 kg =

Men's Greco-Roman 96 kg at the 2011 World Championships
- Venue: Sinan Erdem Dome
- Dates: 12 September 2011
- Competitors: 44 from 44 nations

Medalists
gold medal	Elis Guri	Bulgaria
silver medal	Jimmy Lidberg	Sweden
bronze medal	Rustam Totrov	Russia
bronze medal	Cenk İldem	Turkey

The men's Greco-Roman 96 kilograms is a competition featured at the 2011 World Wrestling Championships, and was held at the Sinan Erdem Dome in Istanbul, Turkey on 12 September 2011.

== Results ==
Legend

- F — Won by fall
- WO — Won by walkover

=== Finals ===
Semifinals				Final
Elis Guri (BUL)	0	1	2
Mohamed Abdelfatah (EGY)	3	0	0	Elis Guri (BUL)	1	1
Jimmy Lidberg (SWE)	0	1	2	Jimmy Lidberg (SWE)	0	1
Cenk İldem (TUR)	1	0	0

=== Top half ===
==== Section 1 ====
Round of 64

Round of 32
~~Ghasem Rezaei (IRI)~~
Robert Avanesyan (ISR)	W	O
Siniša Hogač (CRO)	0	0
Elis Guri (BUL)	3	4
Saleh Naouzat (SYR)	0	0
Daigoro Timoncini (ITA)	1	1
Zbigņevs Romanovskis (LAT)	0	0
Rustam Totrov (RUS)	1	8

Round of 16
Robert Avanesyan (ISR)	0	0
Elis Guri (BUL)	1	1
Daigoro Timoncini (ITA)	0	0
Rustam Totrov (RUS)	1	3

Quarterfinals
Elis Guri (BUL)	0	4	2
Rustam Totrov (RUS)	5	0	0

==== Section 2 ====
Round of 64

Round of 32
Marin Cazac (MDA)	0	1	0
Evgeniy Achkasov (UZB)	1	0	1
Mohamed Abdelfatah (EGY)	0	3	3^{F}
Irakli Kajaia (GEO)	1	0	0
Aldas Lukošaitis (LTU)	0	0
Yunior Estrada (CUB)	1	1
Khabibullo Abdulloev (TJK)	6	0
Marthin Hamlet Nielsen (NOR)	8	7

Round of 16
Evgeniy Achkasov (UZB)	0	0
Mohamed Abdelfatah (EGY)	1	6
Yunior Estrada (CUB)	1	4	3
Marthin Hamlet Nielsen (NOR)	1	0	0

Quarterfinals
Mohamed Abdelfatah (EGY)	1	1
Yunior Estrada (CUB)	0	0

=== Bottom half ===
==== Section 3 ====
Round of 64
Filip Köszeghy (SVK)	0	2
Mirko Englich (GER)	1	3
Yahia Abutabeekh (JOR)	6	1
Dorian Shehu (ALB)	0	0
Dimitriy Timchenko (UKR)	0	1	1
Ardo Arusaar (EST)	1	0	0
Tsimafei Dzeinichenka (BLR)	2	2
Asset Mambetov (KAZ)	0	0

Round of 32
Jimmy Lidberg (SWE)	2	1
Justin Ruiz (USA)	0	0
Hassine Ayari (TUN)	3	0	1
Azamat Erkimbaev (KGZ)	0	2	0
Mirko Englich (GER)	5	1
Yahia Abutabeekh (JOR)	0	0
Dimitriy Timchenko (UKR)	0	1
Tsimafei Dzeinichenka (BLR)	1	4

Round of 16
Jimmy Lidberg (SWE)	1	1
Hassine Ayari (TUN)	0	0
Mirko Englich (GER)	0	2
Tsimafei Dzeinichenka (BLR)	1	3

Quarterfinals
Jimmy Lidberg (SWE)	1	1
Tsimafei Dzeinichenka (BLR)	0	0

==== Section 4 ====
Round of 64
Zhai Ningchao (CHN)	1	3
Damian Fedorowicz (POL)	0	0
Erwin Caraballo (VEN)	0	1	0
Alin Alexuc-Ciurariu (ROU)	1	0	1
Balázs Kiss (HUN)	1	3	3
Georgios Koutsioumpas (GRE)	2	0	0
An Chang-gun (KOR)	0	1	0
Cenk İldem (TUR)	3	0	1
Randy Lambert (HON)	0	0
Ashok Kumar (IND)	3	1
Shalva Gadabadze (AZE)	7	3
Takuma Arizono (JPN)	0	0
David Vála (CZE)	0	1	1
Hughes Bella-Lufu (RSA)	1	0	0
Dejan Franjković (SRB)	0	0
Artur Aleksanyan (ARM)	1	7

Round of 32
Zhai Ningchao (CHN)	0	0
Alin Alexuc-Ciurariu (ROU)	4	3
Balázs Kiss (HUN)	0	1	0
Cenk İldem (TUR)	1	0	3
Ashok Kumar (IND)	0	0
Shalva Gadabadze (AZE)	7	2
David Vála (CZE)	0	0
Artur Aleksanyan (ARM)	1	2

Round of 16
Alin Alexuc-Ciurariu (ROU)	1	1	0
Cenk İldem (TUR)	1	0	3
Shalva Gadabadze (AZE)	0	0
Artur Aleksanyan (ARM)	1	2

Quarterfinals
Cenk İldem (TUR)	0	1	1
Artur Aleksanyan (ARM)	1	0	1

=== Repechage ===
Repechage round 2
Siniša Hogač (CRO)	2	0	1
Robert Avanesyan (ISR)	0	2	0
Justin Ruiz (USA)	2	1
Hassine Ayari (TUN)	0	0

Repechage round 3
Siniša Hogač (CRO)	0	0
Rustam Totrov (RUS)	3	8
Justin Ruiz (USA)	0	0
Tsimafei Dzeinichenka (BLR)	3	1

Bronze medals
Rustam Totrov (RUS)	3	0	2
Mohamed Abdelfatah (EGY)	0	2	0
Tsimafei Dzeinichenka (BLR)	0	0
Cenk İldem (TUR)	3	1
