= 2016 European Wrestling Championships – Men's Greco-Roman 98 kg =

The men's Greco-Roman 98 kg is a competition featured at the 2016 European Wrestling Championships, and was held in Riga, Latvia on March 12.

== Medalists ==
Gold	Nikita Melnikov; Russia
Silver	Artur Aleksanyan; Armenia
Bronze	Cenk İldem; Turkey
Bronze	Aliaksandr Hrabovik; Belarus

== Results ==
Legend

- F — Won by fall

=== Final ===
Final
Nikita Melnikov (RUS)	4
Artur Aleksanyan (ARM)	0

=== Top half ===
Round of 32

Round of 16
Artur Aleksanyan (ARM)	8
Dimitriy Timchenko (UKR)	0
Elis Guri (BUL)	0
Daniel Gastl (AUT)	5
Revaz Nadareishvili (GEO)	9
Vilius Laurinaitis (LTU)	0
Cenk İldem (TUR)	4
Ardo Arusaar (EST)	2

Quarterfinals
Artur Aleksanyan (ARM)	6
Daniel Gastl (AUT)	2
Revaz Nadareishvili (GEO)	0
Cenk İldem (TUR)	7

Semifinals
Artur Aleksanyan (ARM)	6
Cenk İldem (TUR)	2

==== Bottom half ====
Round of 32
Aliaksandr Hrabovik (BLR)	2
Marthin Hamlet Nielsen (NOR)	1
Ivan Nemeth (HUN)	4
Matti Kuosmanen (FIN)	0
Nikita Melnikov (RUS)	3
David Vala (CZE)	0
Daigoro Timoncini (ITA)	1
Carl Fredrik Schoen (SWE)	4

Round of 16
Radoslaw Grzybicki (POL)	0
Peter Oehler (GER)	5
Aleksandrs Safonovs (LAT)	0
Orkhan Nuriyev (AZE)	7
Aliaksandr Hrabovik (BLR)	2
Ivan Nemeth (HUN)	1
Nikita Melnikov (RUS)	5
Carl Fredrik Schoen (SWE)	1

Quarterfinals
Radoslaw Grzybicki (POL)	2
Orkhan Nuriyev (AZE)	3
Aliaksandr Hrabovik (BLR)	0
Nikita Melnikov (RUS)	3

Semifinals
Orkhan Nuriyev (AZE)	1
Nikita Melnikov (RUS)	4

=== Repechage ===
Repechage round 1
David Vala (CZE)	2
Carl Fredrik Schoen (SWE)	0

Repechage round 2
Dimitriy Timchenko (UKR)	5
Daniel Gastl (AUT)	2
David Vala (CZE)	0
Aliaksandr Hrabovik (BLR)	3

Bronze medals
Dimitriy Timchenko (UKR)	6
Cenk İldem (TUR)	6
Aliaksandr Hrabovik (BLR)	6
Orkhan Nuriyev (AZE)	0
