= 2017 European Wrestling Championships – Men's Greco-Roman 98 kg =

The Men's Greco-Roman 98 kg is a competition featured at the 2017 European Wrestling Championships, and was held in Novi Sad, Serbia on May 6.

== Medalists ==
Gold	Felix Baldauf (NOR)
Silver	Aliaksandr Hrabovik (BLR)
Bronze	Balázs Kiss (HUN)
Bronze	Artur Aleksanyan (ARM)

== Results ==
Legend

- F — Won by fall

=== Final ===
Final
Aliaksandr Hrabovik (BLR)	1
Felix Baldauf (NOR)	2

=== Top half ===
==== Section 1 ====
Round of 32

Round of 16
Kukuri Kirtskhalia (GEO)	1
Ardo Arusaar (EST)	4
Oliver Hassler (GER)	1
Aliaksandr Hrabovik (BLR)	2
Balázs Kiss (HUN)	1
Cenk İldem (TUR)	1
Radosław Grzybicki (POL)	6^{F}
Daniel Gastl (AUT)	1

Quarterfinals
Ardo Arusaar (EST)	1
Aliaksandr Hrabovik (BLR)	3
Balázs Kiss (HUN)	4
Radosław Grzybicki (POL)	3

Semifinals
Aliaksandr Hrabovik (BLR)	3
Balázs Kiss (HUN)	1

=== Bottom half ===
Round of 32
Felix Baldauf (NOR)	6
Artur Omarov (CZE)	2
Mikheil Kajaia (SRB)	2
Nikita Melnikov (RUS)	1
Artur Aleksanyan (ARM)	4
Vilius Laurinaitis (LTU)	0

Round of 16
Laokratis Kesidis (GRE)	4
Dimitriy Timchenko (UKR)	7^{F}
Plamen Tashev (BUL)	2
Matti Elias Kuosmanen (FIN)	5
Araz Hasanov (AZE)	1
Felix Baldauf (NOR)	2
Mikheil Kajaia (SRB)	1
Artur Aleksanyan (ARM)	5

Quarterfinals
Dimitriy Timchenko (UKR)	4
Matti Elias Kuosmanen (FIN)	2
Felix Baldauf (NOR)	2
Artur Aleksanyan (ARM)	2

Semifinals
Dimitriy Timchenko (UKR)	7
Felix Baldauf (NOR)	7

=== Repechage ===
Repechage round 1
Artur Omarov (CZE)	8
Araz Hasanov (AZE)	0

Repechage round 2
Oliver Hassler (GER)	2
Ardo Arusaar (EST)	1
Artur Omarov (CZE)	3
Artur Aleksanyan (ARM)	4

Bronze medals
Oliver Hassler (GER)	1
Balázs Kiss (HUN)	4
Artur Aleksanyan (ARM)	5
Dimitriy Timchenko (UKR)	0
