= Wrestling at the 2016 Summer Olympics – Men's Greco-Roman 98 kg =

Men's Greco-Roman 98 kg at the Games of the XXXI Olympiad
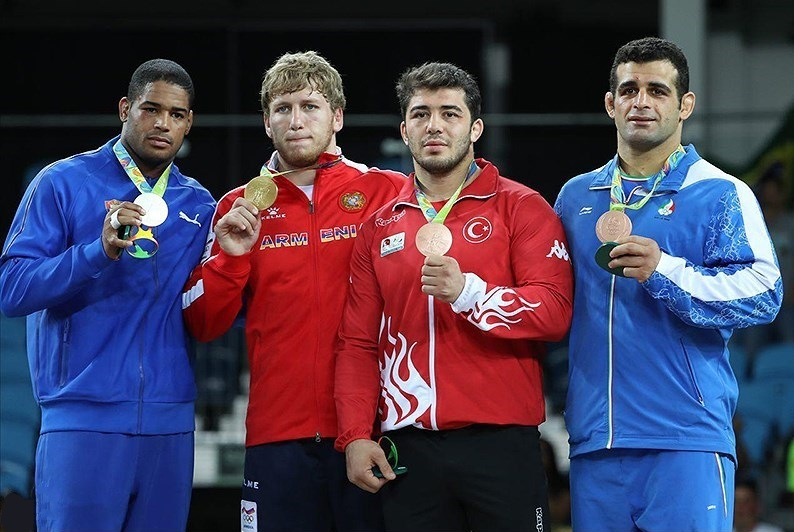
- Left-right: Lugo, Aleksanyan, İldem, Rezaei
- Venue: Carioca Arena 2
- Date: 16 August 2016
- Competitors: 19 from 19 nations

Medalists
1st place, gold medalist(s)		Artur Aleksanyan	Armenia
2nd place, silver medalist(s)		Yasmany Lugo	Cuba
3rd place, bronze medalist(s)		Cenk İldem	Turkey
3rd place, bronze medalist(s)		Ghasem Rezaei	Iran

Men's Greco-Roman 98 kilograms competition at the 2016 Summer Olympics in Rio de Janeiro, Brazil, took place on August 16 at the Carioca Arena 2 in Barra da Tijuca.

This Greco-Roman wrestling competition consists of a single-elimination tournament, with a repechage used to determine the winner of two bronze medals. The two finalists face off for gold and silver medals. Each wrestler who loses to one of the two finalists moves into the repechage, culminating in a pair of bronze medal matches featuring the semifinal losers each facing the remaining repechage opponent from their half of the bracket.

The medals for the competition were presented by Stefan Holm, IOC member, Sweden, and the gifts were presented by Daulet Turlykhanov, Bureau Member of UWW.

== Schedule ==
All times are Brasília Standard Time (UTC−03:00)

Date	Time	Event
16 August 2016	10:00	Qualification rounds
16 August 2016	16:00	Repechage
16 August 2016	17:00	Finals

== Results ==
=== Final ===
Final
Artur Aleksanyan (ARM)	3
Yasmany Lugo (CUB)	0

=== Top half ===
Qualifications

1/8 finals
Artur Aleksanyan (ARM)	5
Daigoro Timoncini (ITA)	2
Hamdy Abdelwahab (EGY)	2
Alin Alexuc-Ciurariu (ROU)	3
Islam Magomedov (RUS)	6
Ardo Arusaar (EST)	0
Cenk İldem (TUR)	2
Hardeep Singh (IND)	1

1/4 finals
Artur Aleksanyan (ARM)	8
Alin Alexuc-Ciurariu (ROU)	0
Islam Magomedov (RUS)	1
Cenk İldem (TUR)	1

Semifinals
Artur Aleksanyan (ARM)	9
Cenk İldem (TUR)	0

=== Bottom half ===
Qualifications
Hamza Haloui (ALG)	0
Elis Guri (BUL)	8
Tsimafei Dzeinichenka (BLR)	1
Fredrik Schön (SWE)	3
Balázs Kiss (HUN)	3
Dimitriy Timchenko (UKR)	0

1/8 finals
Ghasem Rezaei (IRI)	8
Luillys Pérez (VEN)	0
Xiao Di (CHN)	0
Yasmany Lugo (CUB)	2
Revaz Nadareishvili (GEO)	2
Elis Guri (BUL)	3
Fredrik Schön (SWE)	5
Balázs Kiss (HUN)	3

1/4 finals
Ghasem Rezaei (IRI)	0
Yasmany Lugo (CUB)	4
Elis Guri (BUL)	0
Fredrik Schön (SWE)	9

Semifinals
Yasmany Lugo (CUB)	2
Fredrik Schön (SWE)	0

=== Repechage ===
Repechage round 2
Daigoro Timoncini (ITA)	0
Alin Alexuc-Ciurariu (ROU)	3
Xiao Di (CHN)	0
Ghasem Rezaei (IRI)	7

Bronze medals
Alin Alexuc-Ciurariu (ROU)	0
Cenk İldem (TUR)	4
Ghasem Rezaei (IRI)	4
Fredrik Schön (SWE)	4

== Final standing ==
Rank	Athlete
1st place, gold medalist(s)	Artur Aleksanyan (ARM)
2nd place, silver medalist(s)	Yasmany Lugo (CUB)
3rd place, bronze medalist(s)	Cenk İldem (TUR)
3rd place, bronze medalist(s)	Ghasem Rezaei (IRI)
5	Alin Alexuc-Ciurariu (ROU)
5	Fredrik Schön (SWE)
7	Elis Guri (BUL)
8	Islam Magomedov (RUS)
9	Balázs Kiss (HUN)
10	Hamdy Abdelwahab (EGY)
10	Revaz Nadareishvili (GEO)
12	Daigoro Timoncini (ITA)
13	Hardeep Singh (IND)
14	Tsimafei Dzeinichenka (BLR)
15	Dimitriy Timchenko (UKR)
16	Ardo Arusaar (EST)
17	Hamza Haloui (ALG)
17	Luillys Pérez (VEN)
19	Xiao Di (CHN)
