= 2019 World Wrestling Championships – Men's Greco-Roman 97 kg =

Wrestling competition

Men's Greco-Roman 97 kg at the 2019 World Championships
- Venue: Barys Arena
- Dates: 15–16 September 2019
- Competitors: 37 from 37 nations

Medalists
gold medal	Musa Evloev	Russia
silver medal	Artur Aleksanyan	Armenia
bronze medal	Mikheil Kajaia	Serbia
bronze medal	Cenk İldem	Turkey

The men's Greco-Roman 97 kilograms is a competition featured at the 2019 World Wrestling Championships, and was held in Nur-Sultan, Kazakhstan on 15 and 16 September.

== Results ==
Legend

- F — Won by fall
- WO — Won by walkover

=== Finals ===
Semifinals		Final
Musa Evloev (RUS)	9
Mikheil Kajaia (SRB)	0	Musa Evloev (RUS)	WO
Giorgi Melia (GEO)	1	Artur Aleksanyan (ARM)
Artur Aleksanyan (ARM)	3

=== Top half ===
==== Section 1 ====
Round of 64

Round of 32
Musa Evloev (RUS)	4
Jahongir Turdiev (UZB)	1
Yuta Nara (JPN)	7^{F}
Adem Boudjemline (ALG)	5
Laokratis Kesidis (GRE)	3
Pontus Lund (SWE)	4
Tadeusz Michalik (POL)	3
Lee Se-yeol (KOR)	0

Round of 16
Musa Evloev (RUS)	5^{F}
Yuta Nara (JPN)	0
Pontus Lund (SWE)	1
Tadeusz Michalik (POL)	9^{F}

Quarterfinals
Musa Evloev (RUS)	9
Tadeusz Michalik (POL)	0

==== Section 2 ====
Round of 64

Round of 32
Damian von Euw (SUI)	0
Artur Omarov (CZE)	9
Ravi Rathee (IND)	5
Chen Cheng-hao (TPE)	0
Xiao Di (CHN)	2
Vilius Laurinaitis (LTU)	8
Mathias Bak (DEN)	0
Mikheil Kajaia (SRB)	9

Round of 16
Artur Omarov (CZE)	7^{F}
Ravi Rathee (IND)	0
Vilius Laurinaitis (LTU)	2
Mikheil Kajaia (SRB)	5

Quarterfinals
Artur Omarov (CZE)	1
Mikheil Kajaia (SRB)	2

=== Bottom half ===
==== Section 3 ====
Round of 64

Round of 32
G'Angelo Hancock (USA)	6
Mykola Krysov (UKR)	0
Mélonin Noumonvi (FRA)	4
Felix Baldauf (NOR)	1
Yerulan Iskakov (KAZ)	2
Orkhan Nuriyev (AZE)	1
Giorgi Melia (GEO)	5^{F}
Kevin Mejía (HON)	0

Round of 16
G'Angelo Hancock (USA)	2
Mélonin Noumonvi (FRA)	6
Yerulan Iskakov (KAZ)	0
Giorgi Melia (GEO)	4^{F}

Quarterfinals
Mélonin Noumonvi (FRA)	1
Giorgi Melia (GEO)	5

==== Section 4 ====
Round of 64
Elias Kuosmanen (FIN)	3
Luillys Pérez (VEN)	1
Artur Aleksanyan (ARM)	5
Aliaksandr Hrabovik (BLR)	0
Daniel Gastl (AUT)	7
Balázs Kiss (HUN)	9
Gabriel Rosillo (CUB)	9
Daigoro Timoncini (ITA)	0
Mohammad Hadi Saravi (IRI)	5
Peter Öhler (GER)	1

Round of 32
Cenk İldem (TUR)	2
Uzur Dzhuzupbekov (KGZ)	1
Elias Kuosmanen (FIN)	0
Artur Aleksanyan (ARM)	10
Balázs Kiss (HUN)	0
Gabriel Rosillo (CUB)	9
Mohammad Hadi Saravi (IRI)	7
Kiril Milov (BUL)	3

Round of 16
Cenk İldem (TUR)	2
Artur Aleksanyan (ARM)	4
Gabriel Rosillo (CUB)	4
Mohammad Hadi Saravi (IRI)	5

Quarterfinals
Artur Aleksanyan (ARM)	4
Mohammad Hadi Saravi (IRI)	3

=== Repechage ===
Repechage round 1
Aliaksandr Hrabovik (BLR)	2
Elias Kuosmanen (FIN)	2

Repechage round 2
Jahongir Turdiev (UZB)	6
Yuta Nara (JPN)	4
Elias Kuosmanen (FIN)	2
Cenk İldem (TUR)	3

Repechage round 3
Jahongir Turdiev (UZB)	3
Tadeusz Michalik (POL)	4
Cenk İldem (TUR)	7
Mohammad Hadi Saravi (IRI)	5

Bronze medals
Tadeusz Michalik (POL)	1
Mikheil Kajaia (SRB)	9
Cenk İldem (TUR)	4
Giorgi Melia (GEO)	1
