= 2014 World Wrestling Championships – Men's Greco-Roman 98 kg =

Men's Greco-Roman 98 kg at the 2014 World Championships
- Venue: Gymnastics Sport Palace
- Dates: 14 September 2014
- Competitors: 30 from 30 nations

Medalists
gold medal	Artur Aleksanyan	Armenia
silver medal	Oliver Hassler	Germany
bronze medal	Ghasem Rezaei	Iran
bronze medal	Cenk İldem	Turkey

The men's Greco-Roman 98 kilograms is a competition featured at the 2014 World Wrestling Championships, and was held in Tashkent, Uzbekistan on 14 September 2014.

This Greco-Roman wrestling competition consisted of a single-elimination tournament, with a repechage used to determine the winners of two bronze medals.

== Results ==
Legend

- D — Disqualified
- F — Won by fall
- R — Retired
- WO — Won by walkover

=== Final ===
Final
Artur Aleksanyan (ARM)	8
Oliver Hassler (GER)	0

=== Top half ===
Round of 32
Fredrik Schön (SWE)	1
Ghasem Rezaei (IRI)	3
Musa Evloev (RUS)	6
Evgeniy Achkasov (UZB)	0
Ádám Varga (HUN)	3
Robert Avanesyan (ISR)	0
Artur Aleksanyan (ARM)	10
Arslan Saparmämmedow (TKM)	1
Vasil Imerlishvili (GEO)	0
Zhanarbek Kabdolov (KAZ)	1
Vilius Laurinaitis (LTU)	0
Aliaksandr Hrabovik (BLR)	11

Round of 16
Caylor Williams (USA)	0
Marthin Hamlet Nielsen (NOR)	3
Ghasem Rezaei (IRI)	2
Musa Evloev (RUS)	1
Ádám Varga (HUN)	0
Artur Aleksanyan (ARM)	2
Zhanarbek Kabdolov (KAZ)	2
Aliaksandr Hrabovik (BLR)	4

Quarterfinals
Marthin Hamlet Nielsen (NOR)	0
Ghasem Rezaei (IRI)	2
Artur Aleksanyan (ARM)	1
Aliaksandr Hrabovik (BLR)	0

Semifinals
Ghasem Rezaei (IRI)	1
Artur Aleksanyan (ARM)	3

=== Bottom half ===
Round of 32
Spyridon Kountouratzis (GRE)	0
Erwin Caraballo (VEN)	3
Miloslav Metodiev (BUL)	3
Dimitriy Timchenko (UKR)	2
Alin Alexuc-Ciurariu (ROU)	2
Daniel Gastl (AUT)	0
Radosław Grzybicki (POL)	1
Oliver Hassler (GER)	2
Ardo Arusaar (EST)	10
Alimujiang Abudurexiti (CHN)	1
Hardeep Singh (IND)	4
Akira Osaka (JPN)	1
Cenk İldem (TUR)	2
Shalva Gadabadze (AZE)	0
Timo Kallio (FIN)	2^{F}
Karam Gaber (EGY)	0

Round of 16
Erwin Caraballo (VEN)	0^{D}
Miloslav Metodiev (BUL)	4
Alin Alexuc-Ciurariu (ROU)	0
Oliver Hassler (GER)	3
Ardo Arusaar (EST)	4
Hardeep Singh (IND)	1
Cenk İldem (TUR)	3
Timo Kallio (FIN)	1

Quarterfinals
Miloslav Metodiev (BUL)	2^{R}
Oliver Hassler (GER)	7
Ardo Arusaar (EST)	0
Cenk İldem (TUR)	1

Semifinals
Oliver Hassler (GER)	5
Cenk İldem (TUR)	0

=== Repechage ===
Repechage round 1
Arslan Saparmämmedow (TKM)	0
Ádám Varga (HUN)	5
Radosław Grzybicki (POL)	0
Alin Alexuc-Ciurariu (ROU)	3

Repechage round 2
Ádám Varga (HUN)	0
Aliaksandr Hrabovik (BLR)	6
Alin Alexuc-Ciurariu (ROU)	WO
Miloslav Metodiev (BUL)

Bronze medals
Aliaksandr Hrabovik (BLR)	1
Ghasem Rezaei (IRI)	4
Alin Alexuc-Ciurariu (ROU)	0
Cenk İldem (TUR)	1
