= Wrestling at the 2015 European Games – Men's Greco-Roman 98 kg =

Men's Greco-Roman 98 kg at the 2015 European Games
- Venue: Heydar Aliyev Arena
- Date: 13 June
- Competitors: 24 from 24 nations

Medalists
gold medal	Islam Magomedov	Russia
silver medal	Dimitiry Timchenko	Ukraine
bronze medal	Melonin Noumonvi	France
bronze medal	Cenk İldem	Turkey

Men's Greco-Roman 98 kg competition at the 2015 European Games in Baku, Azerbaijan, took place on 13 June at the Heydar Aliyev Arena.

== Schedule ==
All times are Azerbaijan Summer Time (UTC+05:00)

Date	Time	Event
Saturday, 13 June 2015	10:00	Qualifications
Saturday, 13 June 2015	11:00	1/8 finals
Saturday, 13 June 2015	13:00	Quarterfinals
Saturday, 13 June 2015	13:00	Semifinals
Saturday, 13 June 2015	15:00	Repechage
Saturday, 13 June 2015	19:00	Finals

== Results ==
Legend

- F — Won by fall

=== Final ===
Final
(Ukraine) Dimitiry Timchenko (UKR)	0
(Russia) Islam Magomedov (RUS)	4

=== Top half ===
Qualifications

1/8 finals
(Ukraine) Dimitiry Timchenko (UKR)	5
(Greece) Laokratis Kesidis (GRE)	0
(Austria) Daniel Gastl (AUT)	0
(France) Melonin Noumonvi (FRA)	4
(Hungary) Ádám Varga (HUN)	8
(Latvia) Igors Kostins (LAT)	0
(Romania) Alin Alexuc-Ciurariu (ROU)	2
(Belarus) Tsimafei Dzeinichenka (BLR)	5^{F}

Quarterfinals
(Ukraine) Dimitiry Timchenko (UKR)	5
(France) Melonin Noumonvi (FRA)	0
(Hungary) Ádám Varga (HUN)	1
(Belarus) Tsimafei Dzeinichenka (BLR)	6

Semifinals
(Ukraine) Dimitiry Timchenko (UKR)	5
(Belarus) Tsimafei Dzeinichenka (BLR)	5

=== Bottom half ===
Qualifications
(Poland) Łukasz Konera (POL)	1
(Finland) Tuomas Lahti (FIN)	5
(Turkey) Cenk İldem (TUR)	2
(Israel) Robert Avanesyan (ISR)	0
(Norway) Felix Baldauf (NOR)	3
(Lithuania) Vilius Laurinaitis (LTU)	9^{F}
(Azerbaijan) Orkhan Nuriyev (AZE)	4
(Sweden) Theodoros Tounousidis (SWE)	1
(Germany) Oliver Hassler (GER)	0
(Russia) Islam Magomedov (RUS)	6
(Bulgaria) Vladislav Metodiev (BUL)	0
(Estonia) Ardo Arusaar (EST)	5

1/8 finals
(Georgia (country)) Mikheil Kajaia (GEO)	0
(Italy) Daigoro Timoncini (ITA)	4
(Finland) Tuomas Lahti (FIN)	4
(Turkey) Cenk İldem (TUR)	5
(Lithuania) Vilius Laurinaitis (LTU)	1
(Azerbaijan) Orkhan Nuriyev (AZE)	9
(Russia) Islam Magomedov (RUS)	3
(Estonia) Ardo Arusaar (EST)	0

Quarterfinals
(Italy) Daigoro Timoncini (ITA)	0
(Turkey) Cenk İldem (TUR)	2
(Azerbaijan) Orkhan Nuriyev (AZE)	1
(Russia) Islam Magomedov (RUS)	3

Semifinals
(Turkey) Cenk İldem (TUR)	2
(Russia) Islam Magomedov (RUS)	6

=== Repechage ===
Repechage round 1
(Germany) Oliver Hassler (GER)	1
(Estonia) Ardo Arusaar (EST)	3

Repechage round 2
(Greece) Laokratis Kesidis (GRE)	0
(France) Melonin Noumonvi (FRA)	3
(Estonia) Ardo Arusaar (EST)	0
(Azerbaijan) Orkhan Nuriyev (AZE)	2

Bronze medal match
(France) Melonin Noumonvi (FRA)	2
(Belarus) Tsimafei Dzeinichenka (BLR)	0
(Azerbaijan) Orkhan Nuriyev (AZE)	0
(Turkey) Cenk İldem (TUR)	3
