= Wrestling at the 2019 European Games – Men's Greco-Roman 97 kg =

Men's Greco-Roman 97 kg at the 2019 European Games
- Venue: Minsk Sports Palace
- Date: 29 June and 30 June
- Competitors: 15 from 15 nations

Medalists
gold medal	Artur Aleksanyan	Armenia
silver medal	Aliaksandr Hrabovik	Belarus
bronze medal	Felix Baldauf	Norway
bronze medal	Aleksandr Golovin	Russia

The Men's Greco-Roman 97 kilograms competition at the 2019 European Games in Minsk was held on 29 and 30 June 2019 at the Minsk Sports Palace.

== Schedule ==
All times are in FET (UTC+03:00)

Date	Time	Event
Saturday, 29 June 2019	11:40	1/8 finals
Saturday, 29 June 2019	12:50	Quarterfinals
Saturday, 29 June 2019	18:10	Semifinals
Sunday, 30 June 2019	13:10	Repechage
Sunday, 30 June 2019	13:50	Finals

== Results ==
Legend

- F — Won by fall

=== Main bracket ===
1/8 finals
Aliaksandr Hrabovik (BLR)	5
Nikolay Bayryakov (BUL)	1
Cenk İldem (TUR)	3
Elias Kuosmanen (FIN)	1
Mikheil Kajaia (SRB)	6
Balázs Kiss (HUN)	1
Aleksandr Golovin (RUS)	11
Mykola Krysov (UKR)	0
Muhammed Sever (GER)	5
Mélonin Noumonvi (FRA)	6
Daniel Gastl (AUT)	7
Orkhan Nuriyev (AZE)	2
Revaz Nadareishvili (GEO)	1
Artur Aleksanyan (ARM)	2

Quarterfinals
Felix Baldauf (NOR)	1
Aliaksandr Hrabovik (BLR)	3
Cenk İldem (TUR)	7
Mikheil Kajaia (SRB)	5
Aleksandr Golovin (RUS)	9
Mélonin Noumonvi (FRA)	0
Daniel Gastl (AUT)	1
Artur Aleksanyan (ARM)	3

Semifinals
Aliaksandr Hrabovik (BLR)	2
Cenk İldem (TUR)	0
Aleksandr Golovin (RUS)	1
Artur Aleksanyan (ARM)	3

Final
Aliaksandr Hrabovik (BLR)	0
Artur Aleksanyan (ARM)	5

=== Repechage ===
Repechage round 1
Nikolay Bayryakov (BUL)	1
Felix Baldauf (NOR)	8
Revaz Nadareishvili (GEO)	2
Daniel Gastl (AUT)	1

Bronze medals
Felix Baldauf (NOR)	6
Cenk İldem (TUR)	1
Revaz Nadareishvili (GEO)	1
Aleksandr Golovin (RUS)	5
