= Felix Baldauf =

Norwegian Greco-Roman wrestler

Personal information
- Born: 22 October 1994 (age 31) Köthen, Germany
- Height: 1.85 m (6 ft 1 in)

Sport
- Country: Norway
- Sport: Amateur wrestling
- Weight class: 97 kg
- Event: Greco-Roman
Medal record
Men's Greco-Roman wrestling
Representing Norway
European Championships
| Gold medal – first place | 2017 Novi Sad | 98 kg |
European Games
| Bronze medal – third place | 2019 Minsk | 97 kg |
Vehbi Emre & Hamit Kaplan Tournament
| Silver medal – second place | 2016 Istanbul | 98 kg |
| Bronze medal – third place | 2022 Istanbul | 97 kg |
Dan Kolov - Nikola Petrov Tournament
| Gold medal – first place | 2023 Sofia | 97 kg |
Grand Prix
| Gold medal – first place | 2022 Zagreb | 97 kg |
World Junior Championships
| Bronze medal – third place | 2014 Zagreb | 96 kg |
European U23 Championships
| Bronze medal – third place | 2015 Walbrzych | 130 kg |

Felix Baldauf (born 22 October 1994) is a Norwegian Greco-Roman wrestler. He is a European champion and won the gold medal in the men's 98 kg event at the 2017 European Wrestling Championships. Baldauf is also a European Games, World Junior Championships and European U23 Championships bronze medallist.

== Career ==
Baldauf represented Norway in the men's 98 kg event at the 2015 European Games in Baku, where he was eliminated from the competition in his first match. He competed in the men's 98 kg event at the 2017 World Wrestling Championships held in Paris, where he was eliminated in his second match by Rustam Assakalov of Uzbekistan. In 2018, Baldauf competed in the men's 97 kg event at the World Wrestling Championships held in Budapest. He was eliminated in his second match by Artur Aleksanyan of Armenia.

In 2019, Baldauf competed in the men's 97 kg event at the European Wrestling Championships held in Bucharest. In that same year, he won one of the bronze medals in the men's 97 kg event at the 2019 European Games held in Minsk. In his bronze medal match he defeated Cenk İldem of Turkey. In 2019, he also competed in the men's 97 kg event at the World Wrestling Championships held in Nur-Sultan, where he was eliminated in his first match by Mélonin Noumonvi of France.

In March 2021, Baldauf was scheduled to compete at the European Olympic Qualification Tournament in Budapest, but he was unable to do so as he tested positive for COVID-19. In May 2021, he was able to compete at the World Olympic Qualification Tournament held in Sofia, but failed to qualify. He won his first match but he was then eliminated in his next match by Nikoloz Kakhelashvili of Italy.

In 2022, Baldauf won one of the bronze medals in his event at the Vehbi Emre & Hamit Kaplan Tournament held in Istanbul. He lost the bronze medal match in the 97 kg event at the 2022 European Wrestling Championships held in Budapest. A few months later, he competed at the Matteo Pellicone Ranking Series 2022 held in Rome. He competed in the 97 kg event at the 2022 World Wrestling Championships held in Belgrade.

Baldauf won the gold medal in his event at the 2023 Dan Kolov & Nikola Petrov Tournament held in Sofia. He competed at the 2024 European Wrestling Olympic Qualification Tournament in Baku, hoping to qualify for the 2024 Summer Olympics in Paris. He was eliminated in his second match and failed to qualify for the Olympics. Baldauf also competed at the 2024 World Wrestling Olympic Qualification Tournament held in Istanbul, without qualifying for the Olympics.

== Achievements ==
| Year | Tournament | Location | Result | Event |
|---|---|---|---|---|
| 2017 | European Championships | Novi Sad, Serbia | 1st | Greco-Roman 98 kg |
| 2019 | European Games | Minsk, Belarus | 3rd | Greco-Roman 97 kg |
