= Wrestling at the 2012 Summer Olympics – Men's Greco-Roman 96 kg =

Men's Greco-Roman 96 kg at the Games of the XXX Olympiad
- Venue: ExCeL London
- Date: 7 August 2012
- Competitors: 19 from 19 nations

Medalists
1st place, gold medalist(s)		Ghasem Rezaei	Iran
2nd place, silver medalist(s)		Rustam Totrov	Russia
3rd place, bronze medalist(s)		Artur Aleksanyan	Armenia
3rd place, bronze medalist(s)		Jimmy Lidberg	Sweden

Men's Greco-Roman 96 kilograms competition at the 2012 Summer Olympics in London, United Kingdom, took place on 7 August at ExCeL London. This Greco-Roman wrestling competition consists of a single-elimination tournament, with a repechage used to determine the winner of two bronze medals. The two finalists face off for gold and silver medals. Each wrestler who loses to one of the two finalists moves into the repechage, culminating in a pair of bronze medal matches featuring the semifinal losers each facing the remaining repechage opponent from their half of the bracket.

Each bout consists of up to three rounds, lasting two minutes apiece. The wrestler who scores more points in each round is the winner of that rounds; the bout ends when one wrestler has won two rounds (and thus the match).

== Schedule ==
All times are British Summer Time (UTC+01:00)

Date	Time	Event
7 August 2012	13:00	Qualification rounds
7 August 2012	17:45	Repechage
7 August 2012	18:45	Finals

== Results ==
=== Final ===
Final
Ghasem Rezaei (IRI)	2	1
Rustam Totrov (RUS)	0	0

=== Top half ===
Qualifications

1/8 finals
Cenk İldem (TUR)	2	0	0
Ghasem Rezaei (IRI)	0	1	2
Daigoro Timoncini (ITA)	0	0
Artur Aleksanyan (ARM)	1	2
Hassine Ayari (TUN)	2	0	3
Choucri Atafi (MAR)	0	1	0
David Vála (CZE)	0	1	0
Yunior Estrada (CUB)	1	0	1

1/4 finals
Ghasem Rezaei (IRI)	2	1
Artur Aleksanyan (ARM)	0	0
Hassine Ayari (TUN)	0	0
Yunior Estrada (CUB)	1	1

Semifinals
Ghasem Rezaei (IRI)	2	1
Yunior Estrada (CUB)	0	0

=== Bottom half ===
Qualifications
Elis Guri (BUL)	1	1
Alin Alexuc-Ciurariu (ROU)	0	0
Tsimafei Dzeinichenka (BLR)	0	2	1
Mohamed Abdelfatah (EGY)	1	0	0
Erwin Caraballo (VEN)	0	0
Ardo Arusaar (EST)	3	2

1/8 finals
Rustam Totrov (RUS)	0	1	2
Shalva Gadabadze (AZE)	3	0	0
Jimmy Lidberg (SWE)	2	1
Norikatsu Saikawa (JPN)	0	0
Soso Jabidze (GEO)	0	1	0
Elis Guri (BUL)	2	0	1
Tsimafei Dzeinichenka (BLR)	0	1	1
Ardo Arusaar (EST)	1	0	0

1/4 finals
Rustam Totrov (RUS)	1	3
Jimmy Lidberg (SWE)	0	0
Elis Guri (BUL)	0	0
Tsimafei Dzeinichenka (BLR)	1	3

Semifinals
Rustam Totrov (RUS)	3	1
Tsimafei Dzeinichenka (BLR)	0	0

=== Repechage ===
Repechage round 2
Cenk İldem (TUR)	0	0
Artur Aleksanyan (ARM)	1	2
Shalva Gadabadze (AZE)	0	1	0
Jimmy Lidberg (SWE)	1	0	1

Bronze medals
Artur Aleksanyan (ARM)	2	1
Yunior Estrada (CUB)	0	0
Jimmy Lidberg (SWE)	0	1	4
Tsimafei Dzeinichenka (BLR)	2	0	1

== Final standing ==
Rank	Athlete
1st place, gold medalist(s)	Ghasem Rezaei (IRI)
2nd place, silver medalist(s)	Rustam Totrov (RUS)
3rd place, bronze medalist(s)	Artur Aleksanyan (ARM)
3rd place, bronze medalist(s)	Jimmy Lidberg (SWE)
5	Yunior Estrada (CUB)
5	Tsimafei Dzeinichenka (BLR)
7	Elis Guri (BUL)
8	Ardo Arusaar (EST)
9	Hassine Ayari (TUN)
10	Shalva Gadabadze (AZE)
11	Cenk İldem (TUR)
12	David Vála (CZE)
13	Soso Jabidze (GEO)
13	Mohamed Abdelfatah (EGY)
15	Choucri Atafi (MAR)
16	Alin Alexuc-Ciurariu (ROU)
17	Norikatsu Saikawa (JPN)
17	Daigoro Timoncini (ITA)
19	Erwin Caraballo (VEN)
