= 2020 European Wrestling Championships – Men's Greco-Roman 97 kg =

Wrestling competition

The men's Greco-Roman 97 kg is a competition featured at the 2020 European Wrestling Championships, and was held in Rome, Italy on February 11 and February 12.

== Medalists ==
Gold	Artur Aleksanyan; Armenia
Silver	Nikoloz Kakhelashvili; Italy
Bronze	Cenk İldem; Turkey
Bronze	Aleksandr Golovin; Russia

== Results ==
Legend

- F — Won by fall

=== Final ===
Final
Artur Aleksanyan (ARM)	7
Nikoloz Kakhelashvili (ITA)	1

=== Top half ===
Round of 32

Round of 16
Artur Aleksanyan (ARM)	7
Cenk İldem (TUR)	1
Damian von Euw (SUI)	0
Kiril Milov (BUL)	9
Revaz Nadareishvili (GEO)	3
Vilius Laurinaitis (LTU)	2
Elias Kuosmanen (FIN)	4
Oleksandr Shyshman (UKR)	4

Quarterfinals
Artur Aleksanyan (ARM)	9
Kiril Milov (BUL)	0
Revaz Nadareishvili (GEO)	0
Elias Kuosmanen (FIN)	3

Semifinals
Artur Aleksanyan (ARM)	8
Elias Kuosmanen (FIN)	1

=== Bottom half ===
Round of 32
Orkhan Nuriyev (AZE)	0
Tadeusz Michalik (POL)	9

Round of 16
Mikheil Kajaia (SRB)	2
Alex Szőke (HUN)	6
Aleksandr Golovin (RUS)	10
Dzmitry Kaminski (BLR)	1
Anestis Zarifes (GRE)	0
Nikoloz Kakhelashvili (ITA)	9
Artur Omarov (CZE)	6
Tadeusz Michalik (POL)	5

Quarterfinals
Alex Szőke (HUN)	1
Aleksandr Golovin (RUS)	9
Nikoloz Kakhelashvili (ITA)	9
Artur Omarov (CZE)	0

Semifinals
Aleksandr Golovin (RUS)	2
Nikoloz Kakhelashvili (ITA)	4

=== Repechage ===
Repechage round 2
Cenk İldem (TUR)	3
Kiril Milov (BUL)	3
Anestis Zarifes (GRE)	0
Artur Omarov (CZE)	11

Bronze medal match
Cenk İldem (TUR)	3
Elias Kuosmanen (FIN)	3
Artur Omarov (CZE)	0
Aleksandr Golovin (RUS)	8

== Final standing ==
Rank	Athlete
1st place, gold medalist(s)	Artur Aleksanyan (ARM)
2nd place, silver medalist(s)	Nikoloz Kakhelashvili (ITA)
3rd place, bronze medalist(s)	Cenk İldem (TUR)
3rd place, bronze medalist(s)	Aleksandr Golovin (RUS)
5	Elias Kuosmanen (FIN)
5	Artur Omarov (CZE)
7	Tadeusz Michalik (POL)
8	Kiril Milov (BUL)
9	Alex Szőke (HUN)
10	Revaz Nadareishvili (GEO)
11	Oleksandr Shyshman (UKR)
12	Vilius Laurinaitis (LTU)
13	Mikheil Kajaia (SRB)
14	Dzmitry Kaminski (BLR)
15	Damian von Euw (SUI)
16	Orkhan Nuriyev (AZE)
17	Anestis Zarifes (GRE)
