= 2016 Vehbi Emre & Hamit Kaplan Tournament =

- Host city: Turkey, Istanbul
- Dates: January 30 – 31
- Stadium: Ahmet Comert Sports Complex

The 34th Vehbi Emre & Hamit Kaplan Tournament 2016, was a wrestling event held in Istanbul, Turkey between 30 and 31 January 2016.

This international tournament includes competition men's Greco-Roman wrestling. This ranking tournament was held in honor of the Olympic Champion, Hamit Kaplan and Turkish Wrestler and manager Vehbi Emre.

== Medal overview ==
=== Medal table ===
Rank	Nation	Gold	Silver	Bronze	Total
1	Turkey	4	0	5	9
2	Georgia	2	5	4	11
3	Belarus	1	0	2	3
4	Armenia	1	0	0	1
5	Kazakhstan	0	2	2	4
6	Norway	0	1	0	1
7	Azerbaijan	0	0	2	2
8	Kyrgyzstan	0	0	1	1
Totals (8 entries)		8	8	16	32

=== Greco-Roman ===
Event	Gold	Silver	Bronze
59 kg	(Turkey) Mustafa Sağlam	(Georgia (country)) Revaz Lashkhi	(Turkey) Erhan Karakuş
59 kg	(Turkey) Mustafa Sağlam	(Georgia (country)) Revaz Lashkhi	(Azerbaijan) Karim Jafarov
66 kg	(Turkey) Atakan Yüksel	(Kazakhstan) Almat Kebispayev	(Azerbaijan) Islambek Dadov
66 kg	(Turkey) Atakan Yüksel	(Kazakhstan) Almat Kebispayev	(Turkey) Abdülsamet Günal
71 kg	(Turkey) Yunus Emre Başar	(Georgia (country)) Shmagi Bolkvadze	(Kyrgyzstan) Ruslan Tsarev
71 kg	(Turkey) Yunus Emre Başar	(Georgia (country)) Shmagi Bolkvadze	(Georgia (country)) Bakuri Gogoli
75 kg	(Armenia) Arsen Julfalakyan	(Georgia (country)) Mindia Tsulukidze	(Belarus) Kazbek Kilov
75 kg	(Armenia) Arsen Julfalakyan	(Georgia (country)) Mindia Tsulukidze	(Turkey) Osman Köse
80 kg	(Georgia (country)) Lasha Gobadze	(Georgia (country)) Tornike Dzamashvili	(Turkey) Aslan Atem
80 kg	(Georgia (country)) Lasha Gobadze	(Georgia (country)) Tornike Dzamashvili	(Kazakhstan) Doszhan Kartikov
85 kg	(Georgia (country)) Robert Kobliashvili	(Kazakhstan) Nursultan Tursynov	(Georgia (country)) Mate Sopadze
85 kg	(Georgia (country)) Robert Kobliashvili	(Kazakhstan) Nursultan Tursynov	(Georgia (country)) Giorgi Tsirekidze
98 kg	(Turkey) Cenk İldem	(Norway) Felix Baldauf	(Kazakhstan) Alimkhan Syzdykov
98 kg	(Turkey) Cenk İldem	(Norway) Felix Baldauf	(Georgia (country)) Nikoloz Kakhelashvili
130 kg	(Belarus) Ioseb Chugoshvili	(Georgia (country)) Beka Kandelaki	(Turkey) Osman Yıldırım
130 kg	(Belarus) Ioseb Chugoshvili	(Georgia (country)) Beka Kandelaki	(Belarus) Maksim Pashkov

== Participating nations ==
- Argentina
- Armenia
- Azerbaijan
- Belarus
- Estonia
- Georgia
- Kazakhstan
- Kyrgyzstan
- Norway
- Tunisia
- Turkey
- Turkmenistan
- United States
