= Nikita Melnikov (wrestler) =

Russian Greco-Roman wrestler

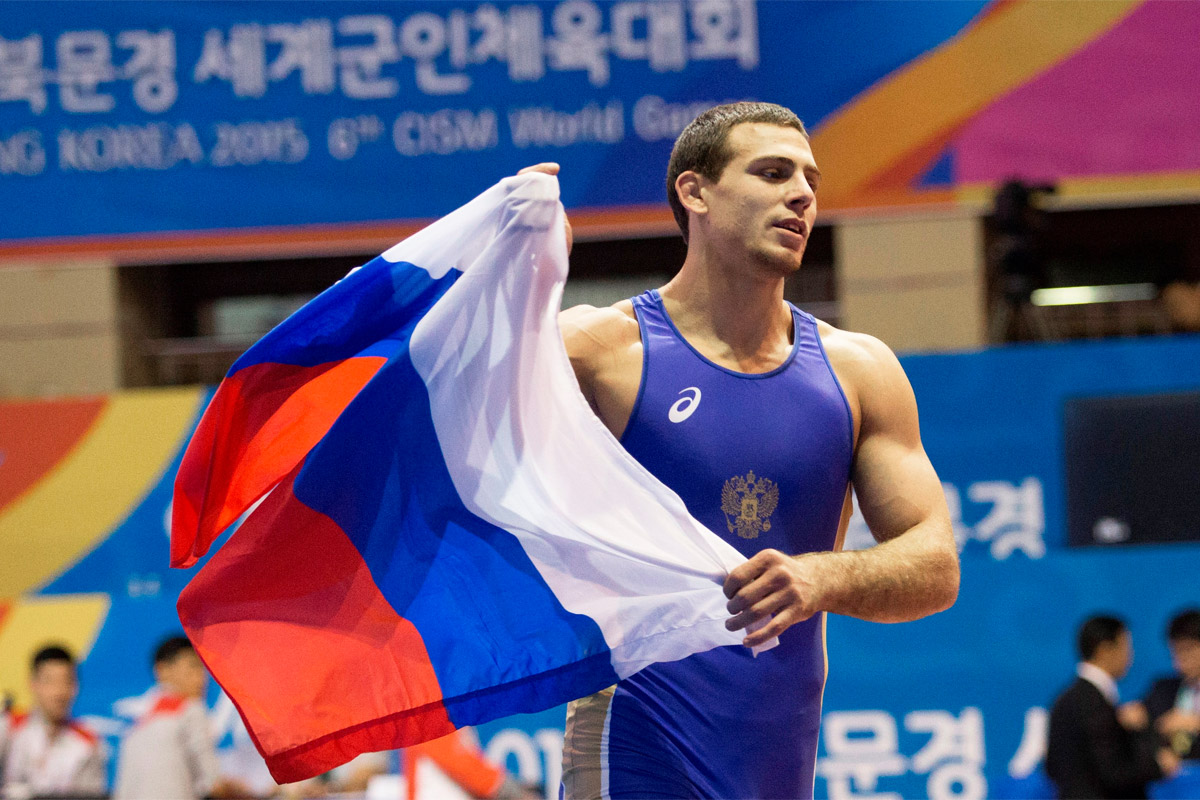

Personal information
- Full name: Nikita Vasilevich Melnikov
- Nationality: Russia
- Born: 27 June 1987 (age 39) Shakhty, Rostov oblast, Russia
- Height: 1.84 m (6 ft 0 in)
- Weight: 215 lb (98 kg; 15.4 st)

Sport
- Country: Russia
- Sport: Wrestling
- Rank: International Master of Sports
- Event: Greco-Roman
Medal record
Representing Russia
Greco-Roman wrestling
World Championships
Gold medal – first place	2013 Budapest	96 kg
European Championships
Gold medal – first place	2016 Riga	98 kg
Summer Universiade
Gold medal – first place	2013 Kazan	96 kg

Nikita Vasilevich Melnikov (Russian: Никита Васильевич Мельников; born 27 June 1987 in Shakhty, Russia) is an Ethnic Russian Greco-Roman wrestler.

He won both gold medals in the 2013 Summer Universiade in Kazan, Russia - his country and 2013 World Wrestling Championships in Budapest, Hungary.

In 2016 European Wrestling Championships he beat third consecutive to Artur Aleksanyan of Armenia and became European Champion in 98 kilos.
