= 2022 World Wrestling Championships – Men's Greco-Roman 97 kg =

Wrestling competitions

Men's Greco-Roman 97 kg at the 2022 World Championships
- Venue: Štark Arena
- Dates: 11–12 September 2022
- Competitors: 29 from 29 nations

Medalists
gold medal	Artur Aleksanyan	Armenia
silver medal	Kiril Milov	Bulgaria
bronze medal	Mohammad Hadi Saravi	Iran
bronze medal	Arif Niftullayev	Azerbaijan

The men's Greco-Roman 97 kilograms is a competition featured at the 2022 World Wrestling Championships, and was held in Belgrade, Serbia on 11 and 12 September 2022.

This Greco-Roman wrestling competition consists of a single-elimination tournament, with a repechage used to determine the winner of two bronze medals. The two finalists face off for gold and silver medals. Each wrestler who loses to one of the two finalists moves into the repechage, culminating in a pair of bronze medal matches featuring the semifinal losers each facing the remaining repechage opponent from their half of the bracket.

== Results ==
Legend

- F — Won by fall
- R — Retired
- WO — Won by walkover

=== Final ===
Final
Artur Aleksanyan (ARM)	5
Kiril Milov (BUL)	1

=== Top half ===
Round of 32
Felix Baldauf (NOR)	5
Liu Yan (CHN)	1
Rustam Assakalov (UZB)	8
Islam Umayev (KAZ)	0
Mathias Bak (DEN)	1
Mikheil Kajaia (SRB)	5
Tadeusz Michalik (POL)	1
Beksultan Makhmudov (KGZ)	1
Vladlen Kozlyuk (UKR)	6
Braxton Amos (USA)	12
Igor Queiroz (BRA)	1
Metehan Başar (TUR)	2
~~Aaron Mbo Isomi (COD)~~
Artur Aleksanyan (ARM)	WO

Round of 16
Mohammad Hadi Saravi (IRI)	8
Felix Baldauf (NOR)	0
Rustam Assakalov (UZB)	8
Mikheil Kajaia (SRB)	0
Beksultan Makhmudov (KGZ)	5
Braxton Amos (USA)	2
Metehan Başar (TUR)	1
Artur Aleksanyan (ARM)	3

Quarterfinals
Mohammad Hadi Saravi (IRI)	7
Rustam Assakalov (UZB)	0
Beksultan Makhmudov (KGZ)	0
Artur Aleksanyan (ARM)	9

Semifinals
Mohammad Hadi Saravi (IRI)	1
Artur Aleksanyan (ARM)	3

=== Bottom half ===
Round of 32
Deepanshu Ahlawat (IND)	3
Lee Se-yeol (KOR)	1
Artur Omarov (CZE)	1
Aleksandar Stjepanetic (SWE)	1
Juan Luis Conde (CUB)	1
Nikoloz Kakhelashvili (ITA)	8
Vilius Laurinaitis (LTU)	4
Lucas Lazogianis (GER)	1
Daniel Gastl (AUT)	2
Arif Niftullayev (AZE)	3
Giorgi Melia (GEO)	7
Takahiro Tsuruda (JPN)	1^{R}

Round of 16
Kiril Milov (BUL)	9
Deepanshu Ahlawat (IND)	1
Aleksandar Stjepanetic (SWE)	1^{R}
Nikoloz Kakhelashvili (ITA)	7
Vilius Laurinaitis (LTU)	0
Arif Niftullayev (AZE)	8
Giorgi Melia (GEO)	1
Alex Szőke (HUN)	3

Quarterfinals
Kiril Milov (BUL)	2
Nikoloz Kakhelashvili (ITA)	0
Arif Niftullayev (AZE)	10
Alex Szőke (HUN)	2

Semifinals
Kiril Milov (BUL)	7^{F}
Arif Niftullayev (AZE)	3

=== Repechage ===
Repechage round 1
~~Aaron Mbo Isomi (COD)~~
Metehan Başar (TUR)	WO

Repechage round 2
Metehan Başar (TUR)	3^{F}
Beksultan Makhmudov (KGZ)	1
Deepanshu Ahlawat (IND)	0
Nikoloz Kakhelashvili (ITA)	12

Bronze medals
Metehan Başar (TUR)	1
Mohammad Hadi Saravi (IRI)	6
Nikoloz Kakhelashvili (ITA)	1
Arif Niftullayev (AZE)	2

== Final standing ==
Rank	Athlete
1st place, gold medalist(s)	Artur Aleksanyan (ARM)
2nd place, silver medalist(s)	Kiril Milov (BUL)
3rd place, bronze medalist(s)	Mohammad Hadi Saravi (IRI)
3rd place, bronze medalist(s)	Arif Niftullayev (AZE)
5	Metehan Başar (TUR)
5	Nikoloz Kakhelashvili (ITA)
7	Rustam Assakalov (UZB)
8	Giorgi Melia (GEO)
9	Beksultan Makhmudov (KGZ)
10	Braxton Amos (USA)
11	Alex Szőke (HUN)
12	Deepanshu Ahlawat (IND)
13	Mikheil Kajaia (SRB)
14	Felix Baldauf (NOR)
15	Vilius Laurinaitis (LTU)
16	Aleksandar Stjepanetic (SWE)
17	Vladlen Kozlyuk (UKR)
18	Daniel Gastl (AUT)
19	Tadeusz Michalik (POL)
20	Artur Omarov (CZE)
21	Igor Queiroz (BRA)
22	Lee Se-yeol (KOR)
23	Lucas Lazogianis (GER)
24	Liu Yan (CHN)
25	Mathias Bak (DEN)
26	Juan Luis Conde (CUB)
27	Takahiro Tsuruda (JPN)
28	Islam Umayev (KAZ)
—	Aaron Mbo Isomi (COD)
