= Hardeep Singh (wrestler) =

Indian Greco-Roman wrestler

Personal information
- Nationality: Indian
- Born: 20 December 1990 (age 35) Jind district, Haryana, India
- Height: 180 cm (5 ft 11 in)
- Spouse: Simran Punia

Sport
- Country: India
- Sport: Greco-Roman wrestling
- Event: 98 kg
Medal record
Men's Wrestling
Representing India
Asian Championships
Silver medal – second place	2016 Bangkok	GR 98 kg
Bronze medal – third place	2020 New Delhi	GR 97 kg
Commonwealth Championships
Gold medal – first place	2013 Johannesburg	GR 96 kg
Bronze medal – third place	2013 Johannesburg	FS 96 kg
Gold medal – first place	2016 Singapore	GR 98 kg
Gold medal – first place	2017 Johannesburg	GR 97 kg
- Updated on 8 November 2016

Hardeep Singh (born 20 December 1990) is a male Greco-Roman wrestler from India. He became Commonwealth Champion in 2013 and finished as runner-up at the 2016 Asian Wrestling Championships. In March 2016, he became the first Indian heavyweight Greco-Roman wrestler to qualify for the Olympics.

== Early life ==
Hardeep was born in a farming family of the Dahola village of Haryana's Jind district. He started wrestling during his school days. His coach identified his talent and got him admitted to a sports school, which taught him the wrestling basics. Singh then trained at Sports Authority of India's regional center for three years. As he made good impression there, he was sent to Chhatrasal Stadium of Delhi to further hone his skills. He trained for four years there. During that period, he also got employed in the Indian Railways. It is noteworthy that he started as a freestyle wrestler during his early days but shifted to the Greco-Roman style after the 2009 Junior National Wrestling Championships.

== Career ==
=== 2013 ===
Hardeep's stint at the 2013 World Wrestling Championships proved to be short-lived as he lost in the round of sixteen to Moldava's Marin Cazac by 3–1.

At the 58th Senior National Wrestling Championship, which was held at Kolkata in November, Hardeep, representing Railways Sports Promotion Board, won gold medal in the 96 kg category of Greco-Roman.

The year ended on a high note for Hardeep as he was able to win gold medal at the 2013 Commonwealth Wrestling Championship after defeating South Africa's Julian Labuschagne in the final of the 96 kg category of Greco-Roman. He also competed in the 96 kg category of freestyle in that event, where he managed to win a bronze medal.

=== 2014 ===
In April, Hardeep competed at the 2014 Asian Wrestling Championships. He won the first round by defeating Uzbekistan's Jahongir Turdiev by 3-1 but lost to the eventual gold medalist Yerulan Iskakov in the next round by 1–4. He got a chance to secure a bronze medal through repechage but lost to China's Di Xiao by 4-0 – finishing fifth in the tournament.

At the 2014 World Wrestling Championships, which were held at the Tashkent, Uzbekistan. Hardeep started well by defeating Japan's Akira Osaka by 3–1 in the qualifying round but lost to Estonian Ardo Arusaar by 1–3 in the Round of 16.

=== 2015 ===
Hardeep started the year's campaign on a positive note by winning gold medal at the 35th National Games.

At the 2015 World Wrestling Championships, Hardeep started well by getting better of Uzbekistan's Jahongir Turdiev by 10–1 in the Round of 32 but lost to Alin Alexuc-Ciurariu of Romania by 0–9 in the next round.

Hardeep ended the year on high note by winning gold medal at the 60th Senior National Wrestling Championship.

=== 2016 ===
At the 2016 Asian Wrestling Championships, which was held in New Delhi, India, hardeep won silver medal in the 98 kg weight category of the Greco-Roman after losing to the Asian Games gold medalist Mehdi Aliyari in the final.

Vying to book an Olympic spot for India in the 98 kg category of Greco-Roman, he participated in the 2016 Asian Wrestling Olympic Qualification Tournament. He defeated Arslan Saparmamedov of Turkmenistan by 11–0 in the quarterfinals before defeating Kazakhstan's Margulan Assembekov by 11–2 in the semifinal. Hardeep, however, lost the final to Di Xiao of China on the account of injury default. But he was able to secure the Olympic quota place by virtue of reaching to the final. This was the first instance, since 2004, that an Indian Greco-Roman wrestler secured an Olympics berth.
