= Islam Magomedov =

Russian wrestler (born 1991)

Islam Magomedov Ислам Магомедов
- Magomedov in 2015

Personal information
- Full name: Islam Kurbanovich Magomedov
- National team: Russia
- Born: 8 February 1991 (age 35) Bolshaya Martynovka, Russia
- Height: 1.82 m (6 ft 0 in)
- Weight: 98 kg (216 lb)

Sport
- Country: Russia
- Sport: Greco-Roman wrestling
- Club: Dynamo Rostov Greco-Roman club
- Coached by: Islam Dugushiev
Medal record
Representing Russia
World Championships
Bronze medal – third place	2015 Las Vegas	98 kg
European Games
Gold medal – first place	2015 Baku	98 kg
Junior World Championships
Gold medal – first place	2010 Budapest	96 kg
Gold medal – first place	2011 Bucharest	96 kg

Islam Kurbanovich Magomedov (Russian: Ислам Курбанович Магомедов, Avar: Ислам МухӀаммад Къурбаназул вас); born 8 February 1991 in Makhachkala) is a Russian Greco-Roman wrestler of Dargin descent . He is a two-time Junior Greco-Roman World Champion and gold medalist at the 2015 Russian National Greco-Roman Wrestling Championships. On 12 June 2015 he won gold medal at the European Games 2015, defeating Ukrainian Dimitriy Timchenko in the final. In the same year Magomedov won bronze medal at the 2015 World Wrestling Championships. Magomedov is International Master of Sports in Greco-Roman Wrestling. He competed at 2016 Summer Olympics, but lost in the quarterfinals.
