= Giorgi Melia =

Georgian wrestler (born 1996)

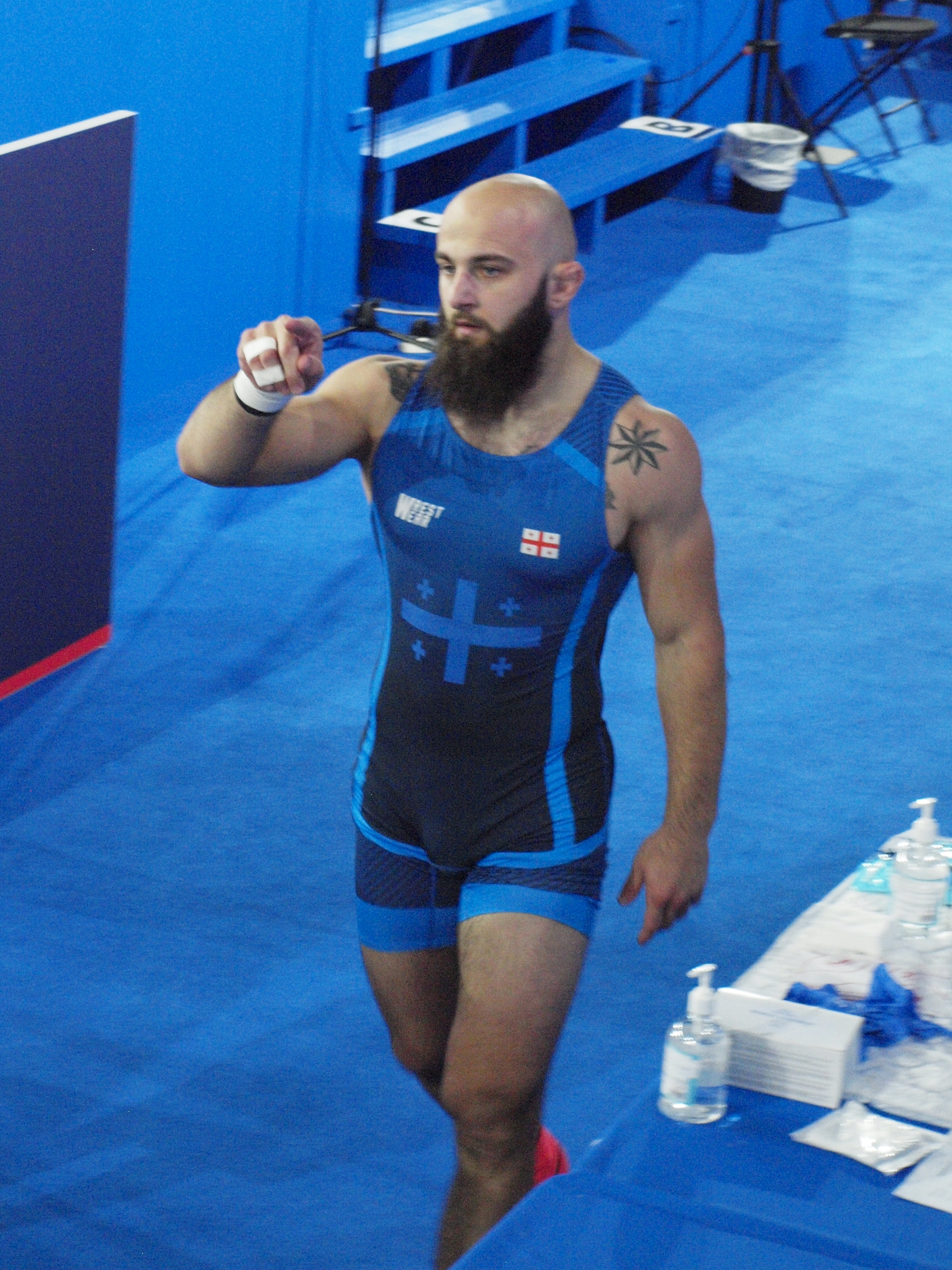
- Melia at the 2021 World Championships

Personal information
- Born: 14 September 1996 (age 29) Samtredia, Imereti, Georgia

Sport
- Country: Georgia
- Sport: Greco-Roman wrestling
- Weight class: 97 kg
Medal record
Men's Greco-Roman wrestling
Representing Georgia
Grand Prix
Gold medal – first place	2021 Bucharest	97 kg
Gold medal – first place	2021 Nice	97 kg
Gold medal – first place	2022 Bucharest	97 kg
Gold medal – first place	2023 Bucharest	97 kg
Gold medal – first place	2025 Budapest	97 kg
Gold medal – first place	2025 Sassari	130 kg
Silver medal – second place	2019 Bucharest	97 kg
Silver medal – second place	2024 Nice	97 kg
Silver medal – second place	2025 Tirana	97 kg
Bronze medal – third place	2024 Budapest	97 kg
Bronze medal – third place	2026 Zagreb	97 kg
Vehbi Emre & Hamit Kaplan Tournament
Bronze medal – third place	2019 Istanbul	97 kg
World U23 Championships
Silver medal – second place	2019 Budapest	97 kg
Bronze medal – third place	2018 Bucharest	97 kg
European U23 Championship
Silver medal – second place	2019 Novi Sad	97 kg
World Juniors Championships
Gold medal – first place	2016 Macon	96 kg

Giorgi Melia (Georgian: გიორგი მელია, born 14 September 1996) is a Georgian wrestler. He competed in the 2020 Summer Olympics.

== Career ==
Melia won gold at the 2016 World Junior Wrestling Championships in the 96 kg weight division and at the Grand Prix de France Henri Deglane 2021 in the 97 kg weight division.

He competed in the 97 kg event at the 2022 World Wrestling Championships held in Belgrade, Serbia.
