= Tsimafei Dzeinichenka =

Belarusian Greco-Roman wrestler

Personal information
- Full name: Tsimafei Aliaksandravich; Dzeinichenka
- Nationality: Belarus
- Born: 5 November 1986 (age 39) Homel, Belarusian SSR
- Height: 1.86 m (6 ft 1 in)
- Weight: 96 kg (212 lb)

Sport
- Sport: Wrestling
- Event: Greco-Roman
- Club: Dynamo Homel
- Coached by: Ihar Piatrenka
Medal record
Men's Greco-Roman wrestling
Representing Belarus
World Championships
Silver medal – second place	2010 Moscow	96 kg
European Championships
Silver medal – second place	2010 Baku	96 kg
Gold medal – first place	2011 Dortmund	96 kg

Tsimafei Aliaksandravich Dzeinichenka (Belarusian: Цімафей Аляксандравіч Дзейнічэнка; born November 5, 1986, in Homel) is an amateur Belarusian Greco-Roman wrestler, who competed in the men's heavyweight category. He won a silver medal for his division at the 2010 European Wrestling Championships in Baku, Azerbaijan, and eventually defeated Armenia's Artur Aleksanyan for the gold at the 2011 European Wrestling Championships in Dortmund, Germany. He also captured a silver medal in the same division at the 2010 World Wrestling Championships in Moscow, Russia, losing out to Iran's Amir Aliakbari. Dzeinichenka is a member of the wrestling team for Dynamo Homel, and is coached and trained by Ihar Piatrenka.

Dzeinichenka represented Belarus at the 2012 Summer Olympics, where he competed in the men's 96 kg class. He defeated Egypt's Mohamed Abdelfatah and Estonia's Ardo Arusaar in the preliminary rounds, and eventually upset Albanian-born Bulgarian wrestler and heavy favorite Elis Guri in the quarterfinal match, receiving a total score of four points in two straight periods. He progressed to the semi-final round, where he was defeated by Russia's Rustam Totrov, who scored a total of four points in two straight periods, leaving Dzeinichenka without a single point. Because Totrov advanced further into the final match against Iran's Ghasem Rezaei, Dzeinichenka automatically qualified for the bronze medal match, but narrowly lost the medal to Sweden's Jimmy Lidberg, with a three-set technical score (2–0, 0–1, 1–4), and a classification point score of 1–3.
