= 2016 European Wrestling Championships =

International wrestling competition held in Latvia

2016 European Championship
- Host city: Riga, Latvia
- Dates: 8–13 March
- Stadium: Riga Arena

Champions
- Freestyle: Georgia
- Greco-Roman: Russia
- Women: Ukraine

The 2016 European Wrestling Championships were held in Riga, Latvia, from 8 March to 13 March 2016.

== Medal table ==
* Host nation (Latvia)

Rank	Nation	Gold	Silver	Bronze	Total
1	Russia	7	1	4	12
2	Georgia	3	2	4	9
3	Turkey	3	1	3	7
4	Azerbaijan	2	2	4	8
5	Ukraine	1	5	8	14
6	Belarus	1	3	6	10
7	Poland	1	2	2	5
8	Armenia	1	2	1	4
9	Germany	1	0	3	4
10	Sweden	1	0	1	2
11	Finland	1	0	0	1
11	Italy	1	0	0	1
11	Latvia*	1	0	0	1
14	Serbia	0	3	0	3
15	Romania	0	1	2	3
16	Israel	0	1	0	1
16	Norway	0	1	0	1
18	Bulgaria	0	0	5	5
19	Hungary	0	0	4	4
20	Moldova	0	0	1	1
Totals (20 entries)		24	24	48	96

== Team ranking ==
Rank	Men's freestyle		Women's freestyle		Men's Greco-Roman	
Rank	Team	Points	Team	Points	Team	Points
1	Georgia	59	Ukraine	59	Russia	48
2	Russia	54	Belarus	49	Armenia	42
3	Ukraine	51	Azerbaijan	48	Azerbaijan	40
4	Belarus	46	Russia	43	Turkey	37
5	Azerbaijan	40	Germany	30	Ukraine	36
6	Bulgaria	34	Romania	27	Georgia	35
7	Poland	29	Turkey	27	Serbia	33
8	Turkey	28	Hungary	27	Germany	26
9	Romania	26	Bulgaria	24	Belarus	24
10	Armenia	21	Poland	22	Hungary	21

== Medal overview ==
=== Men's freestyle ===
Event	Gold	Silver	Bronze
57 kg	Gadzhimurad Rashidov; Russia	Andriy Yatsenko; Ukraine	Andrei Dukov; Romania
57 kg	Gadzhimurad Rashidov; Russia	Andriy Yatsenko; Ukraine	Georgi Vangelov; Bulgaria
61 kg	Vladimer Khinchegashvili; Georgia	Heorhi Kaliyeu; Belarus	Ivan Guidea; Romania
61 kg	Vladimer Khinchegashvili; Georgia	Heorhi Kaliyeu; Belarus	Haji Aliyev; Azerbaijan
65 kg	Frank Chamizo; Italy	Mustafa Kaya; Turkey	Israil Kasumov; Russia
65 kg	Frank Chamizo; Italy	Mustafa Kaya; Turkey	Semen Radulov; Ukraine
70 kg	Magomedmurad Gadzhiev; Poland	Davit Tlashadze; Georgia	Nikolay Kurtev; Bulgaria
70 kg	Magomedmurad Gadzhiev; Poland	Davit Tlashadze; Georgia	Azamat Nurykau; Belarus
74 kg	Soner Demirtaş; Turkey	Jabrayil Hasanov; Azerbaijan	Jakob Makarashvili; Georgia
74 kg	Soner Demirtaş; Turkey	Jabrayil Hasanov; Azerbaijan	Zaur Makiev; Russia
86 kg	Shamil Kudiyamagomedov; Russia	Aleksander Gostiyev; Azerbaijan	Dato Marsagishvili; Georgia
86 kg	Shamil Kudiyamagomedov; Russia	Aleksander Gostiyev; Azerbaijan	Ibragim Aldatov; Ukraine
97 kg	Anzor Boltukaev; Russia	Ivan Yankouski; Belarus	Erik Thiele; Germany
97 kg	Anzor Boltukaev; Russia	Ivan Yankouski; Belarus	Elizbar Odikadze; Georgia
125 kg	Geno Petriashvili; Georgia	Robert Baran; Poland	Alexey Nikolaev; Belarus
125 kg	Geno Petriashvili; Georgia	Robert Baran; Poland	Alen Zasieiev; Ukraine

=== Men's Greco-Roman ===
Event	Gold	Silver	Bronze
59 kg	Mingiyan Semenov; Russia	Roman Amoyan; Armenia	Donior Islamov; Moldova
59 kg	Mingiyan Semenov; Russia	Roman Amoyan; Armenia	Dmytro Tsymbaliuk; Ukraine
66 kg	Islambek Albiev; Russia	Davor Štefanek; Serbia	Kamran Mammadov; Azerbaijan
66 kg	Islambek Albiev; Russia	Davor Štefanek; Serbia	Shmagi Bolkvadze; Georgia
71 kg	Varsham Boranyan; Armenia	Aleksandar Maksimović; Serbia	Hasan Aliyev; Azerbaijan
71 kg	Varsham Boranyan; Armenia	Aleksandar Maksimović; Serbia	Bálint Korpási; Hungary
75 kg	Zurab Datunashvili; Georgia	Viktor Nemeš; Serbia	László Szabó; Hungary
75 kg	Zurab Datunashvili; Georgia	Viktor Nemeš; Serbia	Karapet Chalyan; Armenia
80 kg	Pascal Eisele; Germany	Edgar Babayan; Poland	Aslan Atem; Turkey
80 kg	Pascal Eisele; Germany	Edgar Babayan; Poland	Daniel Aleksandrov; Bulgaria
85 kg	Zhan Beleniuk; Ukraine	Robert Kobliashvili; Georgia	Tadeusz Michalik; Poland
85 kg	Zhan Beleniuk; Ukraine	Robert Kobliashvili; Georgia	Denis Kudla; Germany
98 kg	Nikita Melnikov; Russia	Artur Aleksanyan; Armenia	Cenk İldem; Turkey
98 kg	Nikita Melnikov; Russia	Artur Aleksanyan; Armenia	Aliaksandr Hrabovik; Belarus
130 kg	Rıza Kayaalp; Turkey	Oleksandr Chernetskyi; Ukraine	Johan Euren; Sweden
130 kg	Rıza Kayaalp; Turkey	Oleksandr Chernetskyi; Ukraine	Ioseb Chugoshvili; Belarus

=== Women's freestyle ===
Event	Gold	Silver	Bronze
48 kg	Mariya Stadnyk; Azerbaijan	Alina Vuc; Romania	Elitsa Yankova; Bulgaria
48 kg	Mariya Stadnyk; Azerbaijan	Alina Vuc; Romania	Maryna Markevich; Belarus
53 kg	Sofia Mattsson; Sweden	Iryna Kurachkina; Belarus	Nina Hemmer; Germany
53 kg	Sofia Mattsson; Sweden	Iryna Kurachkina; Belarus	Yuliya Blahinya; Ukraine
55 kg	Irina Ologonova; Russia	Tetyana Kit; Ukraine	Roksana Zasina; Poland
55 kg	Irina Ologonova; Russia	Tetyana Kit; Ukraine	Ramóna Galambos; Hungary
58 kg	Nataliya Synyshyn; Azerbaijan	Grace Bullen; Norway	Hanna Vasylenko; Ukraine
58 kg	Nataliya Synyshyn; Azerbaijan	Grace Bullen; Norway	Mimi Hristova; Bulgaria
60 kg	Petra Olli; Finland	Oksana Herhel; Ukraine	Yuliya Prontsevitch; Russia
60 kg	Petra Olli; Finland	Oksana Herhel; Ukraine	Yuliya Ratkevich; Azerbaijan
63 kg	Anastasija Grigorjeva; Latvia	Yuliya Tkach; Ukraine	Inna Trazhukova; Russia
63 kg	Anastasija Grigorjeva; Latvia	Yuliya Tkach; Ukraine	Marianna Sastin; Hungary
69 kg	Maryia Mamashuk; Belarus	Ilana Kratysh; Israel	Buse Tosun; Turkey
69 kg	Maryia Mamashuk; Belarus	Ilana Kratysh; Israel	Alina Stadnyk; Ukraine
75 kg	Yasemin Adar; Turkey	Alena Storodubtseva; Russia	Vasilisa Marzaliuk; Belarus
75 kg	Yasemin Adar; Turkey	Alena Storodubtseva; Russia	Alla Cherkasova; Ukraine

== Participating nations ==
434 wrestlers from 38 countries:

1. Albania (1)
2. Armenia (14)
3. Austria (9)
4. Azerbaijan (22)
5. Belarus (24)
6. Bulgaria (23)
7. Croatia (7)
8. Czech Republic (5)
9. Denmark (2)
10. Spain (7)
11. Estonia (9)
12. Finland (9)
13. France (5)
14. United Kingdom (3)
15. Georgia (16)
16. Germany (19)
17. Greece (13)
18. Hungary (21)
19. Israel (4)
20. Italy (13)
21. Kosovo (2)
22. Latvia (20) (Host)
23. Lithuania (9)
24. Moldova (16)
25. North Macedonia (4)
26. Montenegro (1)
27. Norway (9)
28. Poland (20)
29. Portugal (3)
30. Romania (18)
31. Russia (24)
32. Slovenia (2)
33. Serbia (6)
34. Switzerland (7)
35. Slovakia (7)
36. Sweden (10)
37. Turkey (24)
38. Ukraine (24)

== See also ==
- List of European Championships medalists in wrestling (freestyle)
- List of European Championships medalists in wrestling (Greco-Roman)
- List of European Championships medalists in wrestling (women)
