= Tadeusz Michalik =

Polish Greco-Roman wrestler

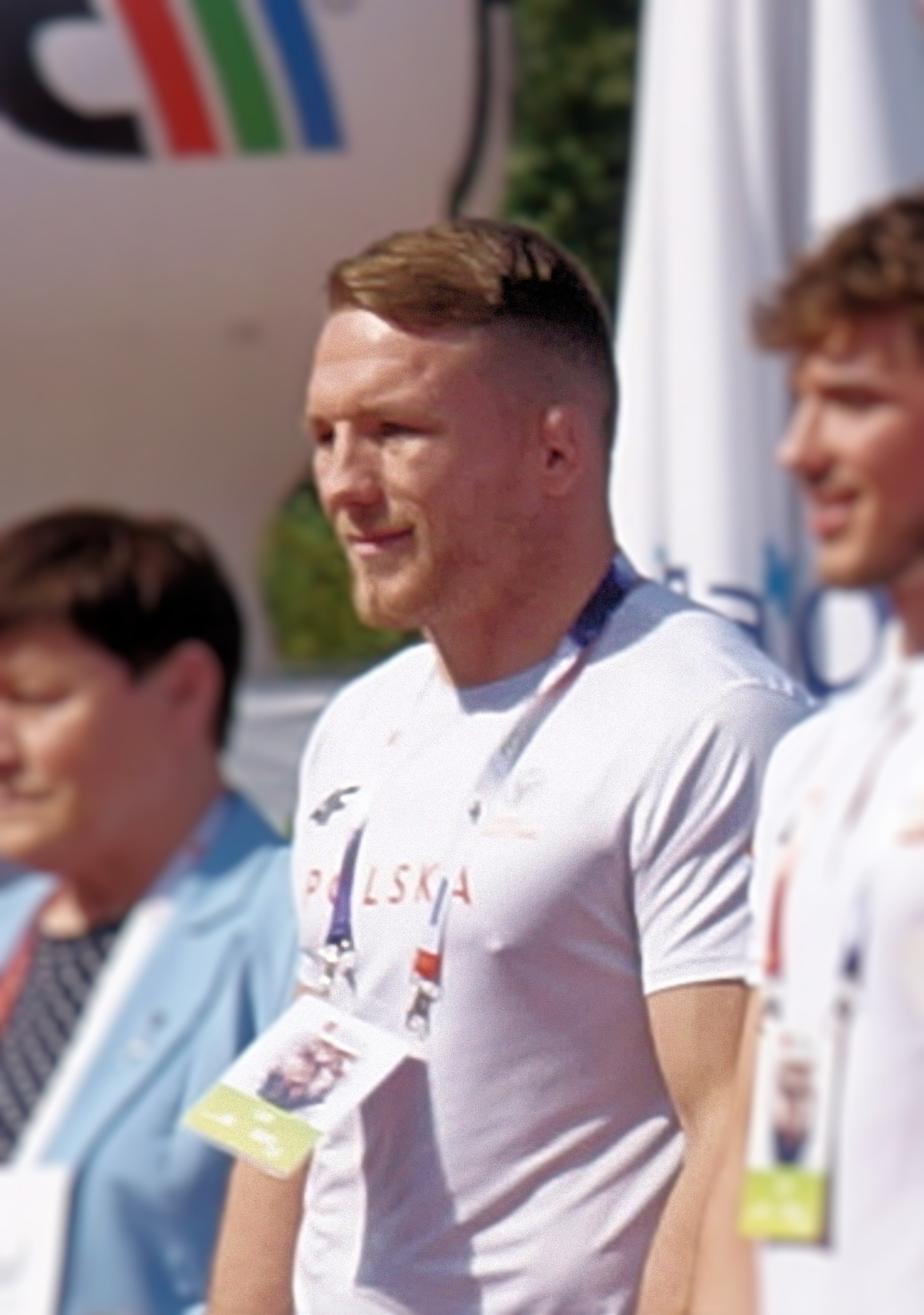
- Michalik in 2021

Personal information
- Born: 16 February 1991 (age 35) Jasieniec, Mazowieckie, Poland

Sport
- Country: Poland
- Sport: Amateur wrestling
- Weight class: 97 kg
- Event: Greco-Roman
Medal record
Men's Greco-Roman wrestling
Representing Poland
Olympic Games
Bronze medal – third place	2020 Tokyo	97 kg
European Championships
Bronze medal – third place	2016 Riga	85 kg

Tadeusz Michalik (born 16 February 1991) is a Polish Greco-Roman wrestler. He represented Poland at the 2020 Summer Olympics in Tokyo, winning a bronze medal in the men's Greco-Roman 97 kg event.

He competed in the 97 kg event at the 2022 World Wrestling Championships held in Belgrade, Serbia.

He competed at the 2024 World Wrestling Olympic Qualification Tournament held in Istanbul, Turkey without qualifying for the 2024 Summer Olympics in Paris, France.

== Personal life ==
His older sister Monika Michalik won a bronze medal in Freestyle wrestling at the 2016 Summer Olympics.
