= Xiao Di =

Chinese Greco-Roman wrestler

Xiao Di (born May 14, 1991 in Binzhou) is a Chinese Greco-Roman wrestler. He competed in the men's Greco-Roman 98 kg event at the 2016 Summer Olympics, in which he was eliminated in the repechage by Ghasem Rezaei.

In 2019, he competed in the men's Greco-Roman 97 kg event at the 2019 World Wrestling Championships held in Nur-Sultan, Kazakhstan.
