= Revaz Nadareishvili =

Georgian Greco-Roman wrestler

Personal information
- Nickname: Revo
- Nationality: Georgian
- Born: June 21, 1991 (age 35)
- Height: 5 ft 10 in (178 cm)
- Weight: 98 kg (216 lb)

Sport
- Country: Georgia
- Sport: Wrestling
- Event: Greco-Roman
- Coached by: Pichiko Shelje (since 2005)
Medal record
Men's Greco-Roman wrestling
Representing Georgia
World Championships
Bronze medal – third place	2017 Paris	98 kg

Revaz Nadareishvili (born June 21, 1991) is a Georgian Greco-Roman wrestler. He won a bronze medal at the 2017 World Wrestling Championships. He competed in the men's Greco-Roman 98 kg event at the 2016 Summer Olympics, in which he was eliminated in the round of 16 by Elis Guri.

In 2022, he competed in the 97 kg event at the European Wrestling Championships in Budapest, Hungary where he was eliminated in his first match.
