= Nikoloz Kakhelashvili =

Italian Greco-Roman wrestler

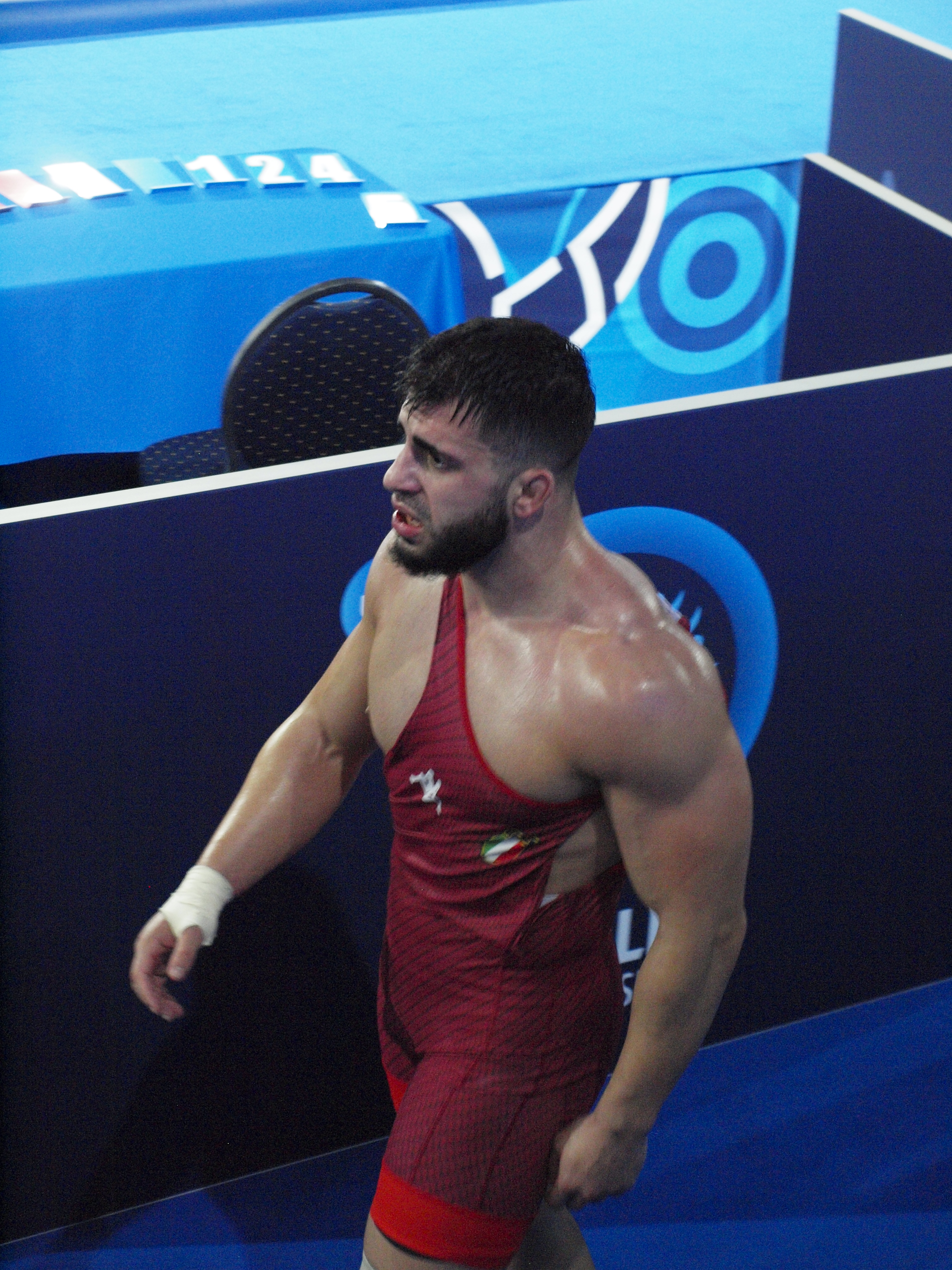
- Kakhelashvili at the 2021 World Wrestling Championships in Oslo, Norway

Personal information
- Born: 14 November 1995 (age 31)
- Height: 184 cm (6 ft 0 in)

Sport
- Country: Italy
- Sport: Amateur wrestling
- Weight class: 97 kg
- Event: Greco-Roman
Medal record
Men's Greco-Roman wrestling
Representing Italy
European Championships
| Silver medal – second place | 2020 Rome | 97 kg |
| Bronze medal – third place | 2021 Warsaw | 97 kg |
Mediterranean Games
| Silver medal – second place | 2026 Taranto | 97 kg |
Representing All-World Team
World Cup
| Bronze medal – third place | 2022 Baku | Team |

Nikoloz Kakhelashvili (born 14 November 1995) is a Georgian-born Italian Greco-Roman wrestler. He is a two-time medalist at the European Wrestling Championships.

== Career ==
Kakhelashvili represented Georgia in several competitions before switching to Italy in 2018.

Kakhelashvili competed in the 97 kg event at the 2018 World Wrestling Championships held in Budapest, Hungary without winning a medal. He was eliminated in his first match by Artur Aleksanyan of Armenia. In 2020, he won the silver medal in the 97 kg event at the European Wrestling Championships held in Rome, Italy. In the final, he lost against Artur Aleksanyan.

In March 2021, Kakhelashvili competed at the European Qualification Tournament in Budapest, Hungary hoping to qualify for the 2020 Summer Olympics in Tokyo, Japan. He won his first two matches but then lost his match in the semi-finals against Arvi Savolainen of Finland. In April 2021, Kakhelashvili won one of the bronze medals in the 97 kg event at the 2021 European Wrestling Championships held in Warsaw, Poland. In May 2021, he also failed to qualify for the Olympics at the World Olympic Qualification Tournament held in Sofia, Bulgaria. In October 2021, Kakhelashvili lost his bronze medal match in the 97 kg event at the 2021 World Wrestling Championships held in Oslo, Norway.

In 2022, Kakhelashvili competed in the 97 kg event at the European Wrestling Championships in Budapest, Hungary where he was eliminated in his first match. A few months later, he won the silver medal in his event at the Matteo Pellicone Ranking Series 2022 held in Rome, Italy. He lost his bronze medal match in the 97 kg event at the 2022 World Wrestling Championships held in Belgrade, Serbia.

Kakhelashvili competed at the 2024 European Wrestling Olympic Qualification Tournament in Baku, Azerbaijan hoping to qualify for the 2024 Summer Olympics in Paris, France. He was eliminated in his second match and he did not qualify for the Olympics. Kakhelashvili also competed at the 2024 World Wrestling Olympic Qualification Tournament held in Istanbul, Turkey without qualifying for the Olympics.

== Achievements ==
| Year | Tournament | Location | Result | Event |
|---|---|---|---|---|
| 2020 | European Championships | Rome, Italy | 2nd | Greco-Roman 97 kg |
| 2021 | European Championships | Warsaw, Poland | 3rd | Greco-Roman 97 kg |
| 2026 | Mediterranean Games | Taranto, Italy | 2nd | Greco-Roman 97 kg |
