= Oliver Hassler =

German Greco-Roman wrestler

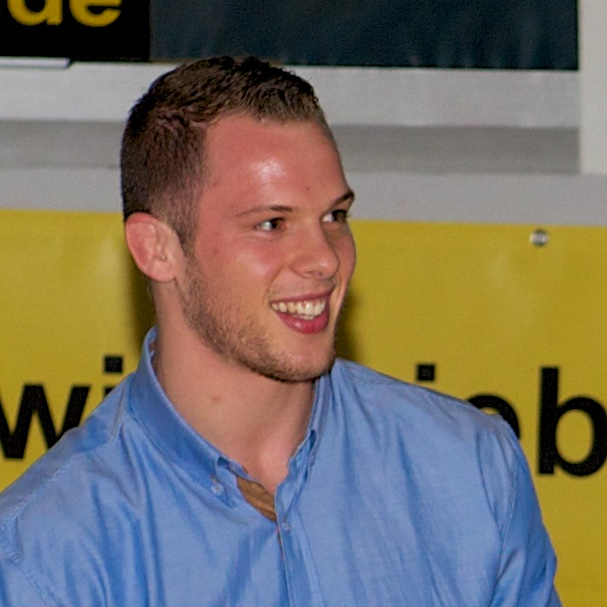
- Oliver Hassler (2014)

Personal information
- Born: 4 January 1988 (age 38)

Sport
- Country: Germany
- Sport: Amateur wrestling
- Event: Greco-Roman
Medal record
Men's Greco-Roman wrestling
Representing Germany
World Wrestling Championships
Silver medal – second place	2014 Tashkent	98 kg
Military World Games
Bronze medal – third place	2019 Wuhan	97 kg

Oliver Hassler (born 4 January 1988) is a German Greco-Roman wrestler. He won the silver medal in the men's 98 kg event at the 2014 World Wrestling Championships held in Tashkent, Uzbekistan. In the final, he lost against Artur Aleksanyan of Armenia.

In 2019, he won one of the bronze medals in the men's 97 kg event at the Military World Games held in Wuhan, China.

== Achievements ==
Year	Tournament	Location	Result	Event
2014	World Championships	Tashkent, Uzbekistan	2nd	Greco-Roman 98 kg
2019	Military World Games	Wuhan, China	3rd	Greco-Roman 97 kg
