= Erwin Caraballo =

Venezuelan Greco-Roman wrestler

Personal information
- Full name: Erwin José Caraballo Cabrera
- Nationality: Venezuela
- Born: 21 July 1981 (age 45) Cumaná, Sucre, Venezuela
- Height: 185 cm (6 ft 1 in)
- Weight: 96 kg (212 lb)

Sport
- Sport: Wrestling
- Event: Greco-Roman
- Club: La Puente
- Coached by: Milcho Radulovski
Medal record
Men's Greco-Roman wrestling
Representing Venezuela
Pan American Games
Bronze medal – third place	2007 Rio de Janeiro	96 kg
Bronze medal – third place	2011 Guadalajara	96 kg
Central American and Caribbean Games
Gold medal – first place	2010 Mayagüez	96 kg

Erwin José Caraballo Cabrera (born July 21, 1981) is an amateur Venezuelan Greco-Roman wrestler, who competes in the men's heavyweight category. He won two bronze medals for the 96 kg division at the 2007 Pan American Games in Rio de Janeiro, Brazil, and at the 2011 Pan American Games in Guadalajara, Mexico. Caraballo also defeated Mexico's Joel López for the gold medal in the same division at the 2010 Central American and Caribbean Games in Mayagüez, Puerto Rico. Caraballo is a member of the wrestling team for La Puente Sporting Club, and is coached and trained by Milcho Radulovski.

Caraballo represented Venezuela at the 2012 Summer Olympics in London, where he competed for the men's 96 kg class. He lost the qualifying round match to Estonia's Ardo Arusaar, who was able to score five points in two straight periods, leaving Caraballo without a single point.
