= Shalva Gadabadze =

Azerbaijani Greco-Roman wrestler

Personal information
- Nationality: Azerbaijan
- Born: 30 May 1984 (age 42) Tbilisi, Georgian SSR
- Height: 178 cm (5 ft 10 in)
- Weight: 101 kg (223 lb)

Sport
- Sport: Wrestling
- Event: Greco-Roman
- Club: Atasport Baku (AZE)
- Coached by: Eldshin Dshafarov (AZE)
Medal record
Men's Greco-Roman wrestling
Representing Azerbaijan
World Wrestling Championships
Bronze medal – third place	2013 Budapest	–96 kg
European Championships
Bronze medal – third place	2009 Vilnius	84 kg
Bronze medal – third place	2011 Dortmund	96 kg
Bronze medal – third place	2012 Belgrade	96 kg
Representing Georgia
Summer Universiade
Gold medal – first place	2005 Izmir	96 kg

Shalva Gadabadze (Azerbaijani: Şalva Qadabadze; born May 30, 1984, in Tbilisi, Georgian SSR) is an amateur Azerbaijani Greco-Roman wrestler, who competes in the men's light heavyweight category. He won two bronze medals at the 2009 European Wrestling Championships in Vilnius, Lithuania, and at the 2011 European Wrestling Championships in Dortmund, Germany. He is a member of Atasport Wrestling Club in Baku, and is coached and trained by Eldshin Dshafarov.

Gadabadze represented his current nation, Azerbaijan, at the 2008 Summer Olympics in Beijing, where he competed in the men's 84 kg class. He first off defeated Tunisia's Haykel Achouri in the preliminary round of sixteen, before losing the quarterfinal match to Hungary's Zoltán Fodor, with a technical score of 2–5. Because his opponent advanced further into the final, Gadabadze was offered another shot at the bronze medal by entering the repechage bouts. He was defeated by China's Ma Sanyi in the first repechage round, with a score of 5–6.

At the 2012 Summer Olympics in London, Gadabadze switched to a heavier class, competing in the men's 96 kg. He received a bye for the second preliminary round, before losing out to Russia's Rustam Totrov, who was able to score three points in two straight periods. Because Totrov advanced further into the final, Gadabadze qualified for the repechage bout, where he was defeated by Sweden's Jimmy Lidberg, with a technical score of 1–2.
