= Aliaksandr Hrabovik =

Belarusian Greco-Roman wrestler

Personal information
- Born: 9 December 1988 (age 37)

Sport
- Country: Belarus
- Sport: Amateur wrestling
- Event: Greco-Roman
Medal record
Men's Greco-Roman wrestling
Representing Belarus
European Championships
| Silver medal – second place | 2017 Novi Sad | 98 kg |
| Bronze medal – third place | 2016 Riga | 98 kg |
European Games
| Silver medal – second place | 2019 Minsk | 97 kg |
Military World Games
| Bronze medal – third place | 2019 Wuhan | 97 kg |

Aliaksandr Hrabovik (born 9 December 1988) is a Belarusian Greco-Roman wrestler. He won the silver medal in the men's 97 kg event at the 2019 European Games held in Minsk, Belarus.

== Career ==
In 2010, Hrabovik competed in the men's Greco-Roman 84 kg event at the World Wrestling Championships held in Moscow, Russia where he was eliminated in his first match by Damian Janikowski of Poland.

At the European Wrestling Championships he won two medals: in 2016, he won one of the bronze medals in the men's 98 kg event and in 2017, he won the silver medal in the men's 98 kg event.

In March 2021, Hrabovik competed at the European Qualification Tournament in Budapest, Hungary hoping to qualify for the 2020 Summer Olympics in Tokyo, Japan. He won his first match by walkover as his opponent, Felix Baldauf of Norway, had tested positive for COVID-19. He was then eliminated in his second match by Nikoloz Kakhelashvili of Italy. In May 2021, he also failed to qualify for the Olympics at the World Olympic Qualification Tournament held in Sofia, Bulgaria.

== Achievements ==
| Year | Tournament | Location | Result | Event |
|---|---|---|---|---|
| 2016 | European Championships | Riga, Latvia | 3rd | Greco-Roman 98 kg |
| 2017 | European Championships | Novi Sad, Serbia | 2nd | Greco-Roman 98 kg |
| 2019 | European Games | Minsk, Belarus | 2nd | Greco-Roman 97 kg |
| 2019 | Military World Games | Wuhan, China | 3rd | Greco-Roman 97 kg |
