= Fredrik Schön =

Swedish Greco-Roman wrestler (born 1987)

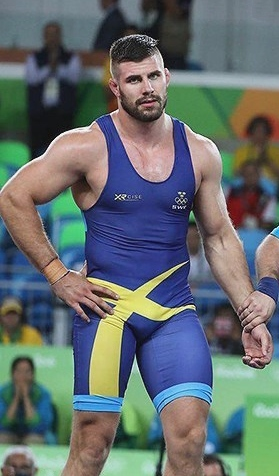
- Schön at the 2016 Olympics

Personal information
- Born: 11 July 1987 (age 39)
- Height: 187 cm (6 ft 2 in)
- Weight: 98 kg (216 lb)
- Website: http://fredrikschon.se

Sport
- Sport: Greco-Roman wrestling
- Club: Svedala BK; IK Sparta
- Coached by: Jimmy Lidberg

Carl Fredrik Stefan Schön (born 11 July 1987) is a heavyweight Greco-Roman wrestler from Sweden. He reached semifinals in the 98 kg weight division at the 2016 Olympics, but lost both the semifinal and the repechage matches.
