= Yerulan Iskakov =

Kazakhstani Greco-Roman wrestler

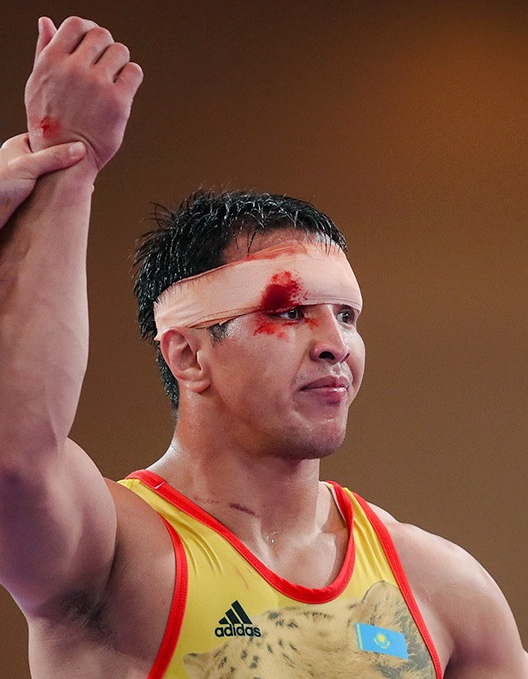
- Iskakov at the 2018 Asian Games

Personal information
- Born: 24 June 1988 (age 37)
- Education: Karaganda State University
- Height: 185 cm (6 ft 1 in)

Sport
- Sport: Greco-Roman wrestling
- Coached by: Nurym Dyusenov (national); Zharmukhambet Urikbayev (personal)
Medal record
Representing Kazakhstan
Asian Games
Bronze medal – third place	2014 Incheon	98 kg
Bronze medal – third place	2018 Jakarta	97 kg
Asian Championships
Silver medal – second place	2013 New Delhi	96 kg
Gold medal – first place	2014 Astana	98 kg
Bronze medal – third place	2017 New Delhi	98 kg
Bronze medal – third place	2018 Bishkek	97 kg
Bronze medal – third place	2021 Almaty	97 kg
- Updated on 5 July 2021

Yerulan Askakovich Iskakov (Russian: Ерулан Аскарович Искаков: born 24 June 1988) is a heavyweight Greco-Roman wrestler from Kazakhstan. He won bronze medals at the 2014 and 2018 Asian Games and 2017 and 2018 Asian championships. He won the Asian championships in 2014.

In 2019, he competed in the 97 kg event at the 2019 World Wrestling Championships held in Nur-Sultan, Kazakhstan.
