= Elias Kuosmanen =

Finnish Greco-Roman wrestler

Personal information
- Full name: Matti Elias Kuosmanen
- Born: 2 September 1995 (age 30) Järvenpää, Uusimaa, Finland
- Height: 1.90 m (6 ft 3 in)
- Weight: 130 kg (290 lb; 20 st)

Sport
- Country: Finland
- Sport: Amateur wrestling
- Weight class: 97 kg
- Event: Greco-Roman
- Club: Helsingin Haka
Medal record
Men's Greco-Roman wrestling
Representing Finland
World Championships
Bronze medal – third place	2025 Zagreb	130 kg
European Championships
Bronze medal – third place	2018 Kaspiysk	97 kg
Bronze medal – third place	2019 Bucharest	97 kg
Military World Games
Silver medal – second place	2019 Wuhan	97 kg
World Military Championships
Gold medal – first place	2025 Warendorf	130 kg
Vehbi Emre & Hamit Kaplan Tournament
Gold medal – first place	2024 Antalya	130 kg
Dan Kolov - Nikola Petrov Tournament
Bronze medal – third place	2023 Sofia	130 kg
Grand Prix
Gold medal – first place	2023 Ilmajoki	130 kg
Silver medal – second place	2023 Nykoebing	130 kg
Silver medal – second place	2024 Ilmajoki	130 kg
Silver medal – second place	2025 Dortmund	130 kg
Bronze medal – third place	2023 Budapest	130 kg
Bronze medal – third place	2026 Tirana	130 kg
World U23 Championships
Silver medal – second place	2017 Bydgoszcz	98 kg

Elias Kuosmanen (born 2 September 1995) is a Finnish Greco-Roman wrestler. He is a two-time bronze medalist at the European Wrestling Championships. He won a bronze medal at the 2025 World Wrestling Championships held in Zagreb, Croatia.

Kuosmanen represented Finland at the 2020 Summer Olympics in Tokyo, Japan. He competed in the men's 130 kg event.

== Career ==
Kuosmanen represented Finland at the 2019 Military World Games held in Wuhan, China and he won the silver medal in the 97 kg event. In 2020, Kuosmanen lost his bronze medal match in the 97 kg event at the European Wrestling Championships held in Rome, Italy.

In 2021, Kuosmanen won one of the bronze medals in the 97 kg event at the Grand Prix Zagreb Open held in Zagreb, Croatia.

Kuosmanen won one of the bronze medals in the 130 kg event at the 2023 Dan Kolov & Nikola Petrov Tournament held in Sofia, Bulgaria. He competed at the 2024 European Wrestling Olympic Qualification Tournament in Baku, Azerbaijan hoping to qualify for the 2024 Summer Olympics in Paris, France. He was eliminated in his first match and he did not qualify for the Olympics. Kuosmanen also competed at the 2024 World Wrestling Olympic Qualification Tournament held in Istanbul, Turkey without qualifying for the Olympics.

== Achievements ==
Year	Tournament	Location	Result	Event
2018	European Championships	Kaspiysk, Russia	3rd	Greco-Roman 97 kg
2019	European Championships	Bucharest, Romania	3rd	Greco-Roman 97 kg
2019	Military World Games	Wuhan, China	2nd	Greco-Roman 97 kg
2025	World Championships	Zagreb, Croatia	3rd	Greco-Roman 130 kg
