= Elis Guri =

Albanian-Bulgarian wrestler

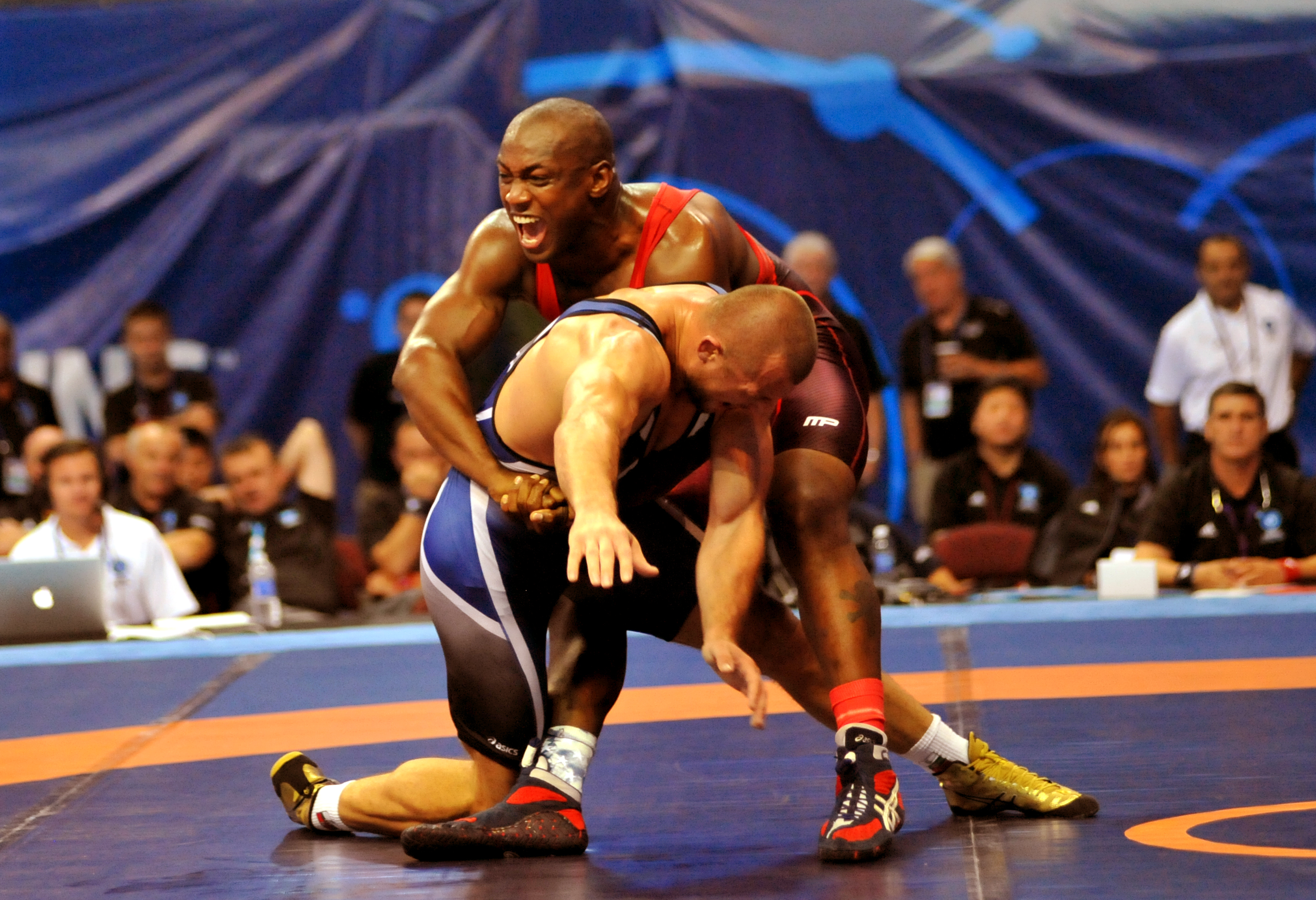
- Guri (in blue) vs. Caylor Williams in 2015

Personal information
- Born: 6 July 1983 (age 43) Shkodër, Albania
Medal record
Men's Greco-Roman wrestling
Representing Bulgaria
World Championships
Gold medal – first place	2011 Istanbul	96 kg
European Championships
Bronze medal – third place	2011 Dortmund	96 kg
Dan Kolov & Nikola Petrov Tournament
Gold medal – first place	2011 Sofia	96 kg
Silver medal – second place	2016 Sofia	98 kg
Representing Albania
European Championships
Bronze medal – third place	2008 Tampere	96 kg

Elis Guri (born 6 July 1983) is an Albanian-Bulgarian Greco-Roman style wrestler He was the 2011 World Champion, a two-time bronze medalist of European championships, and a participant in three summer Olympic Games.

== Professional career ==
Born in Shkodër, Albania, Guri began to participate in wrestling in early childhood under the guidance of his father, Eliyaz - a multiple time champion of Albania in Greco-Roman wrestling. Elis began performing at major international youth competitions since 2002. In 2003, Guri took part in the adult World Cup and finished on 37th place. Guri also tried to qualify for the 2004 Summer Olympics, but lost in the qualifying tournament. For the first time, the Albanian managed to break into the top ten in 2007, when he became the 7th at the world championship in Baku. This result also brought Guri an Olympic license to participate in the Beijing Games. In April 2008, Elis won his first significant award, winning the bronze of the European Championship.

At the 2008 Summer Olympics, Guri competed in the 96 kg category. In the first round, Guri sensationally defeated the current Olympic champion Egyptian Karam Gaber. In the quarter-finals Elis lost to the future finalist German Mirko Englich and went into the consolation round. In the semi-final of the bronze tournament, Guri lost to South Korean wrestler Han Tae Young and took the final 8th place.

After the end of the Games, Guri decided to move to Bulgaria in order to have more opportunities to improve his skills there. Due to the change of citizenship, Elis could not participate in international competitions for two years. Guri began officially participating under the flag of Bulgaria since 2011 and immediately achieved great success. In one year, Elis was able to become bronze medalist of the European Championship, and then won the World Championship, defeating Swede Jimmy Lidberg in the final.

In 2012, Guri performed at his second summer Olympic Games. Like four years ago, Elis fought in the category up to 96 kg. Once again, Guri was able to get to the quarter finals, but there he lost to Timofey Dzeinichenko. Since Belarus lost already in the next match, Elis did not receive the right to participate in the tournament for a bronze medal. According to the results of the competition, the Bulgarian took a high 7th place. After completing the Games, Guri suspended his sports career.

Guri returned to the wrestling carpet in 2015. In September of the same year, Elis took part in the World Championships in Las Vegas. Having demonstrated high skill during the championship, the Bulgarian wrestler was able to reach the semifinals, where he lost to the Olympic champion Iranian Gasim Rezai. In the duel for the bronze medal, Guri lost to the Russian Islam Magomedov and took 5th place. Having entered the 6th strongest at the end of the championship, Elis brought the Bulgarian team an Olympic qualification to participate in the 2016 Games.
