= Artur Aleksanyan =

Armenian Greco-Roman wrestler

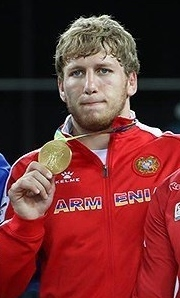
- Aleksanyan in 2016

Personal information
- Native name: Արթուր Ալեքսանյան
- Full name: Artur Aleksanyan
- Nickname: White Bear
- Nationality: Armenian
- Born: 21 October 1991 (age 35) Gyumri, Armenia
- Height: 1.88 m (6 ft 2 in)
- Weight: 98 kg (216 lb)

Sport
- Sport: Wrestling
- Event: Greco-Roman
- Coached by: Gevorg Aleksanyan
Medal record
Event	1st	2nd	3rd
Olympic Games	1	2	1
World Championships	4	3	0
European Championships	7	2	1
European Games	1	0	0
Other	1	0	1
Total	14	7	3
Men's Greco-Roman wrestling
Representing Armenia
Olympic Games
Gold medal – first place	2016 Rio de Janeiro	98 kg
Silver medal – second place	2020 Tokyo	97 kg
Silver medal – second place	2024 Paris	97 kg
Bronze medal – third place	2012 London	96 kg
World Championships
Gold medal – first place	2014 Tashkent	98 kg
Gold medal – first place	2015 Las Vegas	98 kg
Gold medal – first place	2017 Paris	98 kg
Gold medal – first place	2022 Belgrade	97 kg
Silver medal – second place	2013 Budapest	96 kg
Silver medal – second place	2019 Nur-Sultan	97 kg
Silver medal – second place	2023 Belgrade	97 kg
European Games
Gold medal – first place	2019 Minsk	97 kg
European Championships
Gold medal – first place	2012 Belgrade	96 kg
Gold medal – first place	2013 Tbilisi	96 kg
Gold medal – first place	2014 Vantaa	98 kg
Gold medal – first place	2018 Kaspiysk	97 kg
Gold medal – first place	2020 Rome	97 kg
Gold medal – first place	2023 Zagreb	97 kg
Gold medal – first place	2024 Bucharest	97 kg
Silver medal – second place	2011 Dortmund	96 kg
Silver medal – second place	2016 Riga	98 kg
Bronze medal – third place	2017 Novi Sad	98 kg
World Juniors Championships
Gold medal – first place	2010 Budapest	84 kg
Bronze medal – third place	2009 Ankara	84 kg

Artur Aleksanyan (Armenian: Արթուր Ալեքսանյան, born 21 October 1991) is an Armenian Greco-Roman wrestler. He is a gold medalist Olympic Champion (2016) as well as silver medalist (2021, 2024) and bronze medalist (2012), a four-time World Champion (2014, 2015, 2017, 2022), and a seven-time European Champion (2012, 2013, 2014, 2018, 2020, 2023, 2024). Aleksanyan is the second Olympic gold medalist of Armenia since regaining independence in 1991 and is the most decorated Olympian of independent Armenia as well. He has been nicknamed the "White Bear" by a sport journalist Karen Giloyan and is one of the most successful Armenian athletes of the 21st century.

== Career ==
Aleksanyan was born in Gyumri. He started Greco-Roman wrestling in 2000 under the guidance of his father Gevorg Aleksanyan, an honored coach of Armenia. He competed in several junior tournaments and became a Junior World Champion at 84 kg in 2010. In 2011, Aleksanyan moved up a weight class to 96 kg and began competing as a senior.

After winning the Armenian Championship that same year, Aleksanyan joined the Armenian national Greco-Roman wrestling team. He made his European Championship debut at the 2011 European Wrestling Championships in Dortmund and won the silver medal. The following year, Aleksanyan won a gold medal at the 2012 European Wrestling Championships in Belgrade, winning five matches while only giving up one point. Aleksanyan came in first place at the 2012 Olympic Qualification Tournament in Sofia shortly afterwards and won the right to participate at the 2012 Summer Olympics in London. In the opening round he defeated Daigoro Timoncini (Italy) and in quarterfinals lost to eventual champion Ghasem Rezaei (Iran), but in the repechage rounds defeated Cenk Ildem (Turkey) and Yunior Estrada (Cuba) to win a bronze medal.

He won another gold medal at the 2013 European Wrestling Championships in Tbilisi, making him a two-time European Champion. Upon returning home, the Mayor of Gyumri Samvel Balasanyan received Aleksanyan and congratulated the athlete on his recent victory in the European Championships. Balasanyan thanked Aleksanyan for restating the sporting legacy of Gyumri with his performance and awarded him directly. Later that year he won a silver medal at the 2013 World Wrestling Championships in Budapest.

In 2014, Aleksanyan won the gold medal at the 2014 European Wrestling Championships in Vantaa, winning his third European Championship, and later that year also won the gold medal at the 2014 World Wrestling Championships in Tashkent. This was the first World Championship of his senior career. He defeated Ghasem Rezaei in the semifinals, avenging his Olympic loss, and defeated Oliver Hassler (Germany) in the finals. Aleksanyan was voted the Armenian Athlete of the Year for 2014. The following year, he won his second World Championships by winning another gold medal at the 2015 World Wrestling Championships in Las Vegas. He defeated Rezaei again in the finals. Aleksanyan was voted the Armenian Athlete of the Year for 2015, being named the title for a second year in a row.

Aleksanyan entered his second Olympic competition at the 2016 Summer Olympics in Rio de Janeiro. He won consecutive matches against Daigoro Timoncini (Italy), Alin Alexuc-Ciurariu (Romania), Cenk Ildem (Turkey), and Yasmany Lugo (Cuba) and won the gold medal. This made Aleksanyan the second Olympic gold medalist of an independent Armenia, after Armen Nazaryan in 1996. He also became the first Armenian Olympic Champion of the 21st century. In addition, he is the first to win a second Olympic medal for Armenia and as of the 2016 Olympics is the most decorated Olympic sportsman of his country. Aleksanyan was the first wrestler to win two World Championships in between Olympics followed by winning an Olympic gold medal since Aleksandr Karelin in 1996. He was the flag bearer of Armenia at the closing ceremony.

During the medal ceremony, Aleksanyan revealed a shirt under his Olympic jacket with a portrait of Robert Abajyan, a 19-year-old Armenian junior sergeant who was killed in the 2016 Armenian–Azerbaijani clashes of April earlier that year. He dedicated his medal to the Armenian soldiers protecting the border and the victims of the conflict. Aleksanyan also stated he wore the picture of Abajyan so that the whole world would recognize their heroes and also wished that their heroes would not be forgotten. Ruben Abajyan, the elder brother of Robert, expressed gratitude for Aleksanyan: "It was much unexpected for me, for my family members. I can't explain what emotions I had. I was touched, I felt pride; it's hard to explain." Upon arriving back at Armenia, Aleksanyan was approached and hugged by a man at the airport who revealed himself to be Abajyan's father and thanked Aleksanyan for honoring his son.

In 2019, Aleksanyan lit the second torch for the Pan-Armenian Games at Khor Virap

He won the silver medal in the 97 kg event at the 2020 Summer Olympics held in Tokyo, Japan.

He won the gold medal in the 97 kg event at the 2022 World Wrestling Championships held in Belgrade, Serbia.

In 2024, Aleksanyan won the silver medal in the 97 kg event at the Summer Olympics held in Paris, France.

== Personal life ==
Aleksanyan graduated from the Gyumri State Pedagogical Institute.

His father Gevorg is also his coach and holds the title of Honored Coach of Armenia. He also has a brother named Rafayel.

The wrestling school Aleksanyan trains at was named after him in June 2015 after he won his second World Championship.

He has been nicknamed the "White Bear" by his fans. In addition to wrestling, he also likes to play football.

In October 2016, Aleksanyan became an honorary citizen of Yerevan, along with fellow 2016 Olympic wrestling champion Mihran Harutyunyan.

== Awards ==
Aleksanyan was awarded the Khorenatsi medal in 2012, the "For Merit" 1st degree medal in 2014, and the "For Service to Fatherland" 2nd degree medal in 2015.
