= Mélonin Noumonvi =

French Greco-Roman wrestler

Personal information
- Born: 10 October 1982 (age 43)
Medal record
Men's Greco-Roman wrestling
Representing France
World Championships
Silver medal – second place	2009 Herning	–84 kg
Gold medal – first place	2014 Tashkent	–85 kg
European Championships
Bronze medal – third place	2006 Moscow	–84 kg
Bronze medal – third place	2007 Sofia	–84 kg
Bronze medal – third place	2010 Baku	–84 kg
Bronze medal – third place	2013 Tbilisi	96 kg
European Games
Bronze medal – third place	2015 Baku	98 kg
Mediterranean Games
Bronze medal – third place	2005 Almería	– 84 kg
Bronze medal – third place	2009 Pescara	– 84 kg
Gold medal – first place	2013 Mersin	96 kg

Mélonin Noumonvi (born 10 October 1982 in Paris) is a French Greco-Roman (under 84 kg) wrestler.

At the Beijing 2008 Olympics, he lost to the eventual champion Andrea Minguzzi of Italy in the round of 16 and lost the bronze medal bout to Sweden's Ara Abrahamian. However, after Abrahamian refused to take home the bronze medal, he decided to take it. However, the IOC would not allow him that medal, as it was not affected by Abrahamian's tantrum. Furious, Noumonvi began to attack the IOC, but was stopped by security. He was eventually banned from wrestling for a year, but as of 2010, his ban has been lifted. At the London 2012 Olympics, he controversially lost his quarter-final bout to Egypt's Karam Gaber. Two seconds from the end of the third period of that bout, he appeared to manage to take down his opponent. The referees validated the takedown but the judge overruled it. He subsequently lost the bronze medal bout to Poland's Damian Janikowski.
