= Cenk İldem =

Turkish Greco-Roman wrestler

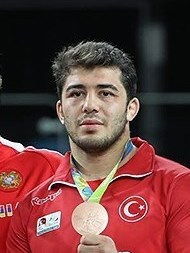

Personal information
- Nickname: Mr. Bronze
- Born: January 5, 1986 (age 40) Şişli, Istanbul, Turkey
- Education: Physical education at Niğde Ömer Halisdemir University
- Height: 1.82 m (6 ft 0 in)
- Weight: 97 kg (214 lb)

Sport
- Country: Turkey
- Sport: Wrestling
- Event: Greco-Roman
- Club: İstanbul Büyükşehir Belediyesi S.K.
- Turned pro: 2005
- Coached by: Hüseyin İldem
- Retired: 2022
Medal record
Men's Greco-Roman wrestling
Representing Turkey
Olympic Games
Bronze medal – third place	2016 Rio de Janeiro	98 kg
World Championships
Bronze medal – third place	2011 Istanbul	96 kg
Bronze medal – third place	2014 Tashkent	98 kg
Bronze medal – third place	2019 Nur-Sultan	97 kg
European Championships
Silver medal – second place	2014 Vantaa	98 kg
Bronze medal – third place	2010 Baku	96 kg
Bronze medal – third place	2013 Tbilisi	96 kg
Bronze medal – third place	2016 Riga	98 kg
Bronze medal – third place	2020 Rome	97 kg
European Games
Bronze medal – third place	2015 Baku	98 kg
Mediterranean Games
Silver medal – second place	2013 Mersin	96 kg
World Cup
Silver medal – second place	2013 Tehran	96 kg
Bronze medal – third place	2012 Saransk	96 kg
Vehbi Emre & Hamit Kaplan Tournament
Gold medal – first place	2015 Istanbul	98 kg
Gold medal – first place	2016 Istanbul	98 kg
Gold medal – first place	2019 Istanbul	97 kg
Bronze medal – third place	2017 Istanbul	98 kg
Golden Grand Prix
Gold medal – first place	2014 Szombathely	98 kg
Silver medal – second place	2014 Baku	98 kg
Bronze medal – third place	2011 Szombathely	96 kg
Bronze medal – third place	2016 Baku	98 kg
World University Championships
Gold medal – first place	2008 Thessaloniki	96 kg
World Juniors Championships
Gold medal – first place	2006 Guatemala City	84 kg
European Juniors Championships
Gold medal – first place	2006 Szombathely	84 kg
Gold medal – first place	2005 Wroclaw	84 kg

Cenk İldem (pronounced [dʒæɲc ˈiːldæm]; born January 5, 1986) is a male wrestler from Turkey competing in the 96 kg division of Greco-Roman style. He is a member of the İstanbul Büyükşehir Belediyesi S.K., where he is coached by his father Hüseyin İldem.

== Personal life ==
His father Hüseyin İldem was a wrestler of Greco-Romen style competing in the 74 kg division for the national team in the years 1980–90. Cenk İldem began with wrestling at the age of ten, with his father's encouragement. Hüseyin İldem coaches his son since then. Cenk's younger brother Kansu also competes in wrestling.

Cenk İldem studied physical education and sports at Niğde University. Since 2007, he serves as a teacher at Şişli Industrial Vocational High School in Istanbul.

He married in 2011.

== Achievements ==
Cenk İldem is winner of several medals in junior and senior class at European as well as world level. He won the gold medal at the World Junior Wrestling Championships in 2006 held in Guatemala City, Guatemala. He became gold medalist at the 2005 European Junior Wrestling Championships held in Hungary and again in 2006 in Poland.

He won the bronze medal at the 2010 European Wrestling Championships in Baku, Azerbaijan and repeated his success in bronze at the 2013 European Wrestling Championships held in Tbilisi, Georgia.

He became bronze medalist at the 2011 World Wrestling Championships in Istanbul, Turkey.

Cenk İldem represented his country at the 2012 Summer Olympics without advancing to the finals.

At 2016 European Wrestling Championships he won bronze medal.

In 2019, he won the bronze medal in the men's Greco-Roman 97 kg event at the 2019 World Wrestling Championships held in Nur-Sultan, Kazakhstan.

In 2021, he won one of the bronze medals in the men's 97 kg event at the Matteo Pellicone Ranking Series 2021 held in Rome, Italy.
