= Dimitriy Timchenko =

Ukrainian Greco-Roman wrestler

Personal information
- Full name: Dimitriy Yurevich Timchenko
- Nationality: Ukrainian
- Born: April 1, 1983 (age 43)
- Height: 1.92 m (6 ft 4 in)
- Weight: 98 kg (216 lb)

Sport
- Sport: Wrestling
- Event: Greco-Roman
Medal record
Men's Greco-Roman wrestling
Representing Ukraine
World Championships
Bronze medal – third place	2015 Las Vegas	98 kg
European Championships
Bronze medal – third place	2005 Varna	96 kg
European Games
Silver medal – second place	2015 Baku	98 kg

Dimitriy Yurevich Timchenko (Ukrainian: Дімітрій Юрійович Тімченко; born 1 April 1983) is a Ukrainian Greco-Roman wrestler. He won a silver medal at the 2015 European Games and a bronze medal in the 2015 World Wrestling Championships.

He competed for Ukraine at the 2016 Summer Olympics.
