= Daigoro Timoncini =

Italian Greco-Roman wrestler

Personal information
- Nationality: Italy
- Born: 13 December 1985 (age 40) Faenza, Italy
- Height: 1.83 m (6 ft 0 in)
- Weight: 96 kg (212 lb)

Sport
- Sport: Wrestling
- Event: Greco-Roman
- Club: GS Forestale (ITA)
- Coached by: Domenico Giuffrida
Medal record
European Championships
Bronze medal – third place	2019 Bucharest	97 kg

Daigoro Timoncini (born 13 December 1985 in Faenza, Ravenna) is an Italian Greco-Roman wrestler. He is also a two-time Olympian, and a six-time Italian national wrestling champion for the heavyweight category.

Timoncini qualified for the 96-kg category in men's Greco-Roman wrestling at the 2008 Summer Olympics in Beijing, after placing fifth at the 2007 World Championships in Baku, Azerbaijan. He first defeated Japan's Kenzo Kato in the qualifying round, but lost to Russia's Aslanbek Khushtov in the second round, without receiving a technical score. Because his second opponent advanced further into the final match, Timoncini automatically qualified for the first repechage bout, where he was defeated by Kazakhstan's Asset Mambetov, who scored a double reversed exposure for the entire period, finishing in tenth place.

At his second Olympics in London, Timoncini improved his tactics and strategy in men's heavyweight division. However, he was eliminated in the first round, after being defeated by Armenia's Artur Aleksanyan, who eventually won the bronze medal in this event. Timoncini finished in eighteenth place.
