= Ardo Arusaar =

Estonian Greco-Roman wrestler (born 1988)

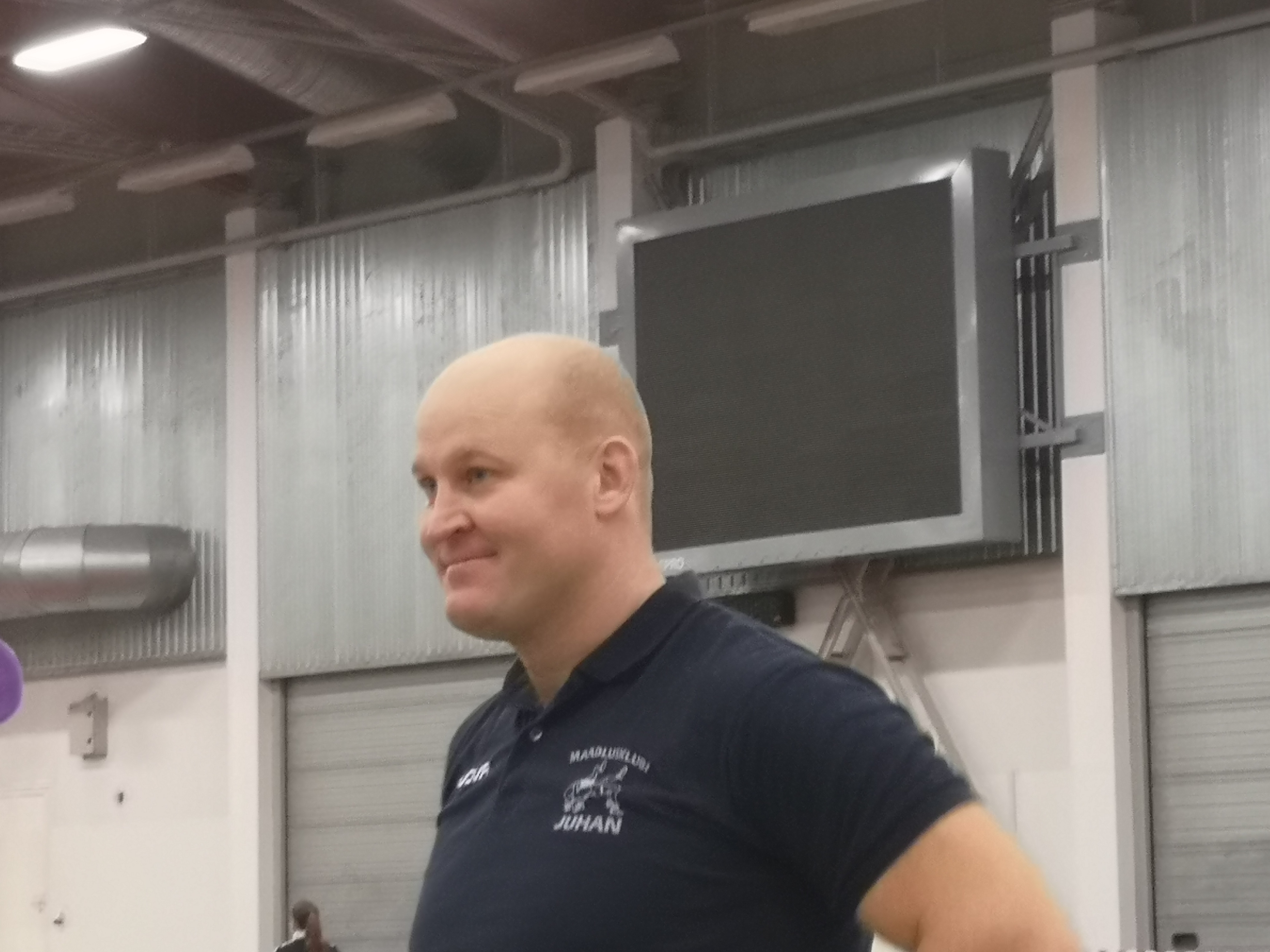
Arusaar in 2019

Ardo Arusaar (born 24 June 1988 in Pärnu) is an Estonian Greco-Roman wrestler. He competed in the Greco-Roman 96 kg event at the 2012 Summer Olympics; after defeating Erwin Caraballo in the qualifications, he was eliminated by Tsimafei Dzeinichenka in the 1/8 finals. At the 2016 Olympics, he competed in the Greco-Roman 98 kg event. He lost to Islam Magomedov in the last 16.
