= 2025 Polyák Imre & Varga János Memorial Tournament =

- Host city: Budapest, Hungary
- Dates: 17-20 July 2025
- Stadium: SYMA Sports and Conference Centre

Champions
- Freestyle: Georgia
- Greco-Roman: Azerbaijan
- Women: India

The 2025 Polyák Imre & Varga János Memorial Tournament, is a wrestling event held in Budapest, Hungary between 17 and 20 July 2025.It was held as the fourth of the ranking series of United World Wrestling in 2025.

With an aim to reward wrestlers participating in Ranking Series tournaments, the United World Wrestling awarded prize money to the medal winners in all weight classes with a total prize money of 390,000 Swiss Francs. The gold medal winners at the four Ranking Series tournaments in 2023 will receive 1500 Swiss Francs with the silver medallists getting 750 Swiss Francs. The two bronze medallists will receive 500 Swiss Francs each.

== Ranking Series ==
Ranking Series Calendar 2025:

- 1st Ranking Series: 5-9 February, Croatia, Zagreb ⇒ 2025 Grand Prix Zagreb Open
- 2nd Ranking Series: 26 February-2 March, Tirana, Albania ⇒ 2025 Muhamet Malo Tournament
- 3rd Ranking Series: 29 May-1 June, Mongolia, Ulaanbaatar ⇒ 2025 Ulaanbaatar Open
- 4th Ranking Series: 17-20 July, Hungary, Budapest ⇒ 2025 Polyák Imre & Varga János Memorial Tournament

== Competition schedule ==
All times are (UTC+2)

Date	Time	Event
17 July	10.30-14.30	Qualification rounds & repechage FS 57-61-65-70-79-97-125 kg
17 July	18.00-20.30	Final matches and awarding ceremony: FS 57-61-65-70-79-97-125 kg
18 July	10.30-14.30	Qualification rounds & repechage FS 74-86-92 kg & WW 50-53-57-59-72 kg
18 July	18.00-20.30	Final matches and awarding ceremony: Finals FS 74-86-92 kg & WW 50-53-57-59-72 kg
19 July	10.30-14.30	Qualification rounds & repechage WW 55-62-65-68-76 kg & GR 72-87-130 kg
19 July	18.00-20.30	Final matches and awarding ceremony: Finals WW 55-62-65-68-76 kg & GR 72-87-130 kg
20 July	10.30-14.30	Qualification rounds & repechage GR 55-60-63-67-77-82-97 kg
20 July	18.00-20.30	Final matches and awarding ceremony: Finals GR 55-60-63-67-77-82-97 kg

== Medal table ==
* Host nation (Hungary)

Rank	Nation	Gold	Silver	Bronze	Total
–	United World Wrestling	7	5	8	20
1	Georgia	4	1	4	9
2	United States	4	0	7	11
3	India	3	3	4	10
4	Japan	3	0	0	3
5	Azerbaijan	2	3	4	9
6	Bahrain	2	0	1	3
7	Hungary*	1	5	5	11
8	Norway	1	0	1	2
8	Turkey	1	0	1	2
10	Brazil	1	0	0	1
10	Denmark	1	0	0	1
12	Moldova	0	3	0	3
13	Kazakhstan	0	2	5	7
14	Armenia	0	2	1	3
15	Kyrgyzstan	0	1	2	3
16	Canada	0	1	1	2
16	Poland	0	1	1	2
16	Uzbekistan	0	1	1	2
19	Germany	0	1	0	1
19	Tajikistan	0	1	0	1
21	Iran	0	0	3	3
22	Bulgaria	0	0	2	2
23	Austria	0	0	1	1
23	France	0	0	1	1
23	Greece	0	0	1	1
23	Italy	0	0	1	1
23	Romania	0	0	1	1
23	Serbia	0	0	1	1
23	South Korea	0	0	1	1
Totals (29 entries)		30	30	58	118

== Team ranking ==
Rank	Men's freestyle		Men's Greco-Roman		Women's freestyle	
Rank	Team	Points	Team	Points	Team	Points
1	Georgia	105	Azerbaijan	94	India	130
2	United States	102	Kazakhstan	88	United States	130
3	Azerbaijan	100	Uzbekistan	87	Hungary	86
4	Japan	77	Hungary	84	Turkey	74
5	Bahrain	75	Georgia	81	Kazakhstan	60
6	Kazakhstan	67	Moldova	54	Canada	45
7	India	66	India	35	South Korea	43
8	Hungary	46	United States	32	Norway	33
9	Iran	45	Armenia	30	Germany	32
10	Poland	39	Serbia	27	Brazil	25

== Medal overview ==
=== Men's freestyle ===
Event	Gold	Silver	Bronze
57 kg	Luke Lilledahl; United States	Islam Bazarganov; Azerbaijan	Rahul Deswal; India
57 kg	Luke Lilledahl; United States	Islam Bazarganov; Azerbaijan	Aryan Tsiutryn; United World Wrestling
61 kg	Takara Suda; Japan	Taiyrbek Zhumashbek Uulu; Kyrgyzstan	Bekzat Almaz Uulu; Kyrgyzstan
61 kg	Takara Suda; Japan	Taiyrbek Zhumashbek Uulu; Kyrgyzstan	Assylzhan Yessengeldi; Kazakhstan
65 kg	Sujeet Kalkal; India	Ali Rahimzade; Azerbaijan	Vazgen Tevanyan; Armenia
65 kg	Sujeet Kalkal; India	Ali Rahimzade; Azerbaijan	Goderdzi Dzebisashvili; Georgia
70 kg	Yoshinosuke Aoyagi; Japan	Arman Andreasyan; Armenia	Akaki Kemertelidze; Georgia
70 kg	Yoshinosuke Aoyagi; Japan	Arman Andreasyan; Armenia	Sina Khalili; Iran
74 kg	Kota Takahashi; Japan	Magomed Khaniev; Azerbaijan	Magomedrasul Asluev; Bahrain
74 kg	Kota Takahashi; Japan	Magomed Khaniev; Azerbaijan	David Carr; United States
79 kg	Vladimeri Gamkrelidze; Georgia	Magomet Evloev; Tajikistan	Fariborz Babaei; Iran
79 kg	Vladimeri Gamkrelidze; Georgia	Magomet Evloev; Tajikistan	Georgios Kougioumtsidis; Greece
86 kg	Arsenii Dzhioev; Azerbaijan	Mahamedkhabib Kadzimahamedau; United World Wrestling	Ali Savadkouhi; Iran
86 kg	Arsenii Dzhioev; Azerbaijan	Mahamedkhabib Kadzimahamedau; United World Wrestling	Osman Göçen; Turkey
92 kg	Trent Hidlay; United States	Miriani Maisuradze; Georgia	Abubakr Abakarov; Azerbaijan
92 kg	Trent Hidlay; United States	Miriani Maisuradze; Georgia	Ben Honis; Italy
97 kg	Akhmed Tazhudinov; Bahrain	Zbigniew Baranowski; Poland	Jonathan Aiello; United States
97 kg	Akhmed Tazhudinov; Bahrain	Zbigniew Baranowski; Poland	Adlan Viskhanov; France
125 kg	Shamil Sharipov; Bahrain	Dzianis Khramiankou; United World Wrestling	Alen Khubulov; Bulgaria
125 kg	Shamil Sharipov; Bahrain	Dzianis Khramiankou; United World Wrestling	Robert Baran; Poland

=== Men's Greco-Roman ===
Event	Gold	Silver	Bronze
55 kg	Emin Sefershaev; United World Wrestling	Marlan Mukashev; Kazakhstan	Anil Mor; India
55 kg	Emin Sefershaev; United World Wrestling	Marlan Mukashev; Kazakhstan	Denis Mihai; Romania
60 kg	Nihat Mammadli; Azerbaijan	Sumit Dalal; India	Sadyk Lalaev; United World Wrestling
60 kg	Nihat Mammadli; Azerbaijan	Sumit Dalal; India	Georgii Tibilov; Serbia
63 kg	Sergey Emelin; United World Wrestling	Vitalie Eriomenco; Moldova	Dinislam Bammatov; United World Wrestling
63 kg	Sergey Emelin; United World Wrestling	Vitalie Eriomenco; Moldova	Yerzhet Zharlykassyn; Kazakhstan
67 kg	Joni Khetsuriani; Georgia	Valentin Petic; Moldova	Håvard Jørgensen; Norway
67 kg	Joni Khetsuriani; Georgia	Valentin Petic; Moldova	Leri Abuladze; Georgia
72 kg	Iuri Lomadze; Georgia	Abdullo Aliev; Uzbekistan	Otar Abuladze; Georgia
72 kg	Iuri Lomadze; Georgia	Abdullo Aliev; Uzbekistan	Ruslan Nurullayev; Azerbaijan
77 kg	Sergey Kutuzov; United World Wrestling	Róbert Fritsch; Hungary	Sergey Stepanov; United World Wrestling
77 kg	Sergey Kutuzov; United World Wrestling	Róbert Fritsch; Hungary	Levente Lévai; Hungary
82 kg	Adlet Tiuliubaev; United World Wrestling	Zoltán Lévai; Hungary	Jalgasbay Berdimuratov; Uzbekistan
82 kg	Adlet Tiuliubaev; United World Wrestling	Zoltán Lévai; Hungary	Erik Szilvássy; Hungary
87 kg	Turpal Bisultanov; Denmark	Dávid Losonczi; Hungary	Tamás Lévai; Hungary
87 kg	Turpal Bisultanov; Denmark	Dávid Losonczi; Hungary	Islam Abbasov; Azerbaijan
97 kg	Giorgi Melia; Georgia	Hayk Khloyan; Armenia	Markus Ragginger; Austria
97 kg	Giorgi Melia; Georgia	Hayk Khloyan; Armenia	Murad Ahmadiyev; Azerbaijan
130 kg	Marat Kamparov; United World Wrestling	Dáriusz Vitek; Hungary	Alimkhan Syzdykov; Kazakhstan
130 kg	Marat Kamparov; United World Wrestling	Dáriusz Vitek; Hungary	Koppány László; Hungary

=== Women's freestyle ===
Event	Gold	Silver	Bronze
50 kg	Evin Demirhan Yavuz; Turkey	Elizaveta Smirnova; United World Wrestling	Neelam Sirohi; India
50 kg	Evin Demirhan Yavuz; Turkey	Elizaveta Smirnova; United World Wrestling	Natalia Pudova; United World Wrestling
53 kg	Antim Panghal; India	Natalia Malysheva; United World Wrestling	Park Seo-young; South Korea
53 kg	Antim Panghal; India	Natalia Malysheva; United World Wrestling	Felicity Taylor; United States
55 kg	Ekaterina Verbina; United World Wrestling	Karla Godinez; Canada	Cristelle Rodriguez; United States
57 kg	Helen Maroulis; United States	Neha Sharma; India	Iryna Kurachkina; United World Wrestling
57 kg	Helen Maroulis; United States	Neha Sharma; India	Nilufar Raimova; Kazakhstan
59 kg	Erika Bognár; Hungary	Elena Brugger; Germany	Abigail Nette; United States
59 kg	Erika Bognár; Hungary	Elena Brugger; Germany	Nadzeya Bulanaya; United World Wrestling
62 kg	Amina Tandelova; United World Wrestling	Alina Kasabieva; United World Wrestling	Manisha Bhanwala; India
62 kg	Amina Tandelova; United World Wrestling	Alina Kasabieva; United World Wrestling	Ana Godinez; Canada
65 kg	Grace Bullen; Norway	Irina Rîngaci; Moldova	Enikő Elekes; Hungary
65 kg	Grace Bullen; Norway	Irina Rîngaci; Moldova	Macey Kilty; United States
68 kg	Kennedy Blades; United States	Noémi Szabados; Hungary	Yuliana Yaneva; Bulgaria
68 kg	Kennedy Blades; United States	Noémi Szabados; Hungary	Brooklyn Hays; United States
72 kg	Harshita Mor; India	Zhamila Bakbergenova; Kazakhstan	Kseniia Burakova; United World Wrestling
76 kg	Thamires Machado; Brazil	Priya Malik; India	Aiperi Medet Kyzy; Kyrgyzstan
76 kg	Thamires Machado; Brazil	Priya Malik; India	Elmira Syzdykova; Kazakhstan

== Participating nations ==
443 wrestlers from 45 countries:

1. Albania (1)
2. Algeria (1)
3. Armenia (5)
4. Australia (1)
5. Austria (3)
6. Azerbaijan (25)
7. Belgium (1)
8. Brazil (7)
9. Bahrain (6)
10. Bulgaria (7)
11. Canada (8)
12. Costa Rica (1)
13. Croatia (10)
14. Denmark (1)
15. Estonia (1)
16. France (10)
17. Finland (3)
18. Georgia (26)
19. Germany (6)
20. Greece (2)
21. Hungary (35) (Host)
22. India (21)
23. Iran (4)
24. Italy (2)
25. Japan (4)
26. Kazakhstan (45)
27. Kyrgyzstan (4)
28. South Korea (26)
29. Lithuania (5)
30. Moldova (8)
31. Mexico (1)
32. Netherlands (1)
33. Nigeria (1)
34. Norway (6)
35. Philippines (1)
36. Poland (10)
37. Puerto Rico (3)
38. Romania (2)
39. Serbia (11)
40. Slovakia (4)
41. Sweden (1)
42. Tajikistan (1)
43. Turkey (25)
44. United States (36)
45. Uzbekistan (15)
46. United World Wrestling (Russia+Belarus) (48)

== Results ==
Legend

- F — Won by fall
- R — Retired
- WO — Won by walkover

=== Men's freestyle ===
==== Men's freestyle 57 kg ====
Round of 16
Abzal Okenov (KAZ)	0
Niklas Stechele (GER)	2^{F}
Bekir Keser (TUR)	2
Kim Sung-gwon (KOR)	8
Islam Bazarganov (AZE)	5
Aryan Tsiutryn (UWW)	2
Peter Hammer (CRC)	0
Luka Gvinjilia (GEO)	6^{F}

Quarterfinals
Luke Lilledahl (USA)	4
Niklas Stechele (GER)	2
Kim Sung-gwon (KOR)	3
Rahul Deswal (IND)	5
Abylaikhan Almukhamedov (KAZ)	2
Islam Bazarganov (AZE)	10
Luka Gvinjilia (GEO)	3
Roberti Dingashvili (GEO)	6

Semifinals
Luke Lilledahl (USA)	7
Rahul Deswal (IND)	6
Islam Bazarganov (AZE)	5
Roberti Dingashvili (GEO)	2

Final
Luke Lilledahl (USA)	3
Islam Bazarganov (AZE)	1

Repechage round 1
Aryan Tsiutryn (UWW)	12
Abylaikhan Almukhamedov (KAZ)	1

Bronze medal match
Niklas Stechele (GER)	0
Rahul Deswal (IND)	4
Aryan Tsiutryn (UWW)	10
Roberti Dingashvili (GEO)	0

==== Men's freestyle 61 kg ====
Round of 16
Dzmitry Shamela (UWW)	11^{F}
Balázs Rácz (HUN)	0
Taiyrbek Zhumashbek Uulu (KGZ)	2
Emrah Ormanoğlu (TUR)	1
Georgii Okorokov (AUS)	6
Udit Kumar (IND)	6
Assylzhan Yessengeldi (KAZ)	4
Dylan Shawver (PUR)	3
Arman Eloyan (FRA)	4
Seth Gross (USA)	14
Adil Ospanov (KAZ)	4
Giorgi Goniashvili (GEO)	7

Quarterfinals
Bekzat Almaz Uulu (KGZ)	10
Dzmitry Shamela (UWW)	5
Taiyrbek Zhumashbek Uulu (KGZ)	5
Udit Kumar (IND)	0
Assylzhan Yessengeldi (KAZ)	10
Seth Gross (USA)	0
Giorgi Goniashvili (GEO)	2
Takara Suda (JPN)	12

Semifinals
Bekzat Almaz Uulu (KGZ)	2
Taiyrbek Zhumashbek Uulu (KGZ)	3
Assylzhan Yessengeldi (KAZ)	3
Takara Suda (JPN)	4

Final
Taiyrbek Zhumashbek Uulu (KGZ)	3
Takara Suda (JPN)	5

Repechage round 1
Emrah Ormanoğlu (TUR)	WO
Udit Kumar (IND)

Bronze medal match
Emrah Ormanoğlu (TUR)	3
Bekzat Almaz Uulu (KGZ)	4
Giorgi Goniashvili (GEO)	0
Assylzhan Yessengeldi (KAZ)	10

==== Men's freestyle 65 kg ====
Round of 32
	Score	
Yun Jun-sik (KOR)	2–6 Fall	Khamzat Arsamerzouev (FRA)

Round of 16
Sujeet Kalkal (IND)	11
Islam Dudaev (ALB)	0
Khamzat Arsamerzouev (FRA)	5
Nursultan Sadyk (KAZ)	4
Krzysztof Bieńkowski (POL)	0
Vazgen Tevanyan (ARM)	6
Mikyay Naim (BUL)	2
Gamzatgadzsi Halidov (HUN)	7
Colin Realbuto (ITA)	0
Zoltán Mizsei (HUN)	10
Alibeg Alibegov (BRN)	6
Ilyas Abdurashidov (BEL)	4
Ali Rahimzade (AZE)	3
Goderdzi Dzebisashvili (GEO)	1
Sherkhan Abil (KAZ)	4
Nika Zakarashvili (GEO)	2

Quarterfinals
Sujeet Kalkal (IND)	11
Khamzat Arsamerzouev (FRA)	0
Vazgen Tevanyan (ARM)	7
Gamzatgadzsi Halidov (HUN)	0
Zoltán Mizsei (HUN)	2
Alibeg Alibegov (BRN)	6
Ali Rahimzade (AZE)	11
Sherkhan Abil (KAZ)	0

Semifinals
Sujeet Kalkal (IND)	6
Vazgen Tevanyan (ARM)	1
Alibeg Alibegov (BRN)	2
Ali Rahimzade (AZE)	9

Final
Sujeet Kalkal (IND)	5
Ali Rahimzade (AZE)	1

Repechage round 2
Islam Dudaev (ALB)
Khamzat Arsamerzouev (FRA)	WO
Goderdzi Dzebisashvili (GEO)	10
Sherkhan Abil (KAZ)	0

Bronze medal match
Khamzat Arsamerzouev (FRA)	0
Vazgen Tevanyan (ARM)	9
Goderdzi Dzebisashvili (GEO)	7
Alibeg Alibegov (BRN)	7

==== Men's freestyle 70 kg ====
Round of 16
Abbas Ebrahimzadeh (IRI)	9
Kanan Heybatov (AZE)	4
Brandon Cannon (USA)	11
Akaki Kemertelidze (GEO)	14
Yoshinosuke Aoyagi (JPN)	13
Haydar Yavuz (TUR)	2
Ismail Musukaev (HUN)	6
Patryk Ołenczyn (POL)	1
Meirzhan Ashirov (KAZ)	0
Austin Gomez (MEX)	10
Viktor Voinović (SRB)	1
Sina Khalili (IRI)	5
Arman Andreasyan (ARM)	6
Yegor Anchugin (KAZ)	1

Quarterfinals
Zelimkhan Mutsukhaev (POL)	0
Abbas Ebrahimzadeh (IRI)	10
Akaki Kemertelidze (GEO)	1
Yoshinosuke Aoyagi (JPN)	4
Ismail Musukaev (HUN)	0
Austin Gomez (MEX)	10
Sina Khalili (IRI)	3
Arman Andreasyan (ARM)	4

Semifinals
Abbas Ebrahimzadeh (IRI)	0
Yoshinosuke Aoyagi (JPN)	11
Austin Gomez (MEX)	4
Arman Andreasyan (ARM)	6

Final
Yoshinosuke Aoyagi (JPN)	8
Arman Andreasyan (ARM)	0

Repechage round 1
Haydar Yavuz (TUR)	2
Akaki Kemertelidze (GEO)	4
Yegor Anchugin (KAZ)	1
Sina Khalili (IRI)	4

Bronze medal match
Akaki Kemertelidze (GEO)	11
Abbas Ebrahimzadeh (IRI)	4
Sina Khalili (IRI)	WO
Austin Gomez (MEX)

==== Men's freestyle 74 kg ====
Round of 16
Magomedrasul Asluev (BRN)	12
Han Dae-gil (KOR)	1
Giorgi Elbakidze (GEO)	2
Jaideep Narwal (IND)	5
Alibek Abdikassymov (KAZ)
Magomed Khaniev (AZE)	WO
Han Sang-ho (KOR)	3
Yeldos Kuanyshbay (KAZ)	14
David Carr (USA)	5
Turan Bayramov (AZE)	3
Orozobek Toktomambetov (KGZ)	5
Szymon Wojtkowski (POL)	4
Murad Kuramagomedov (HUN)	7
Adam Thomson (CAN)	2
Kota Takahashi (JPN)	6
Tajmuraz Salkazanov (SVK)	6

Quarterfinals
Magomedrasul Asluev (BRN)	6
Jaideep Narwal (IND)	5
Magomed Khaniev (AZE)	13
Yeldos Kuanyshbay (KAZ)	2
David Carr (USA)	8
Orozobek Toktomambetov (KGZ)	0
Murad Kuramagomedov (HUN)	0
Kota Takahashi (JPN)	3

Semifinals
Magomedrasul Asluev (BRN)	2
Magomed Khaniev (AZE)	4
David Carr (USA)	7
Kota Takahashi (JPN)	9

Final
Magomed Khaniev (AZE)	0
Kota Takahashi (JPN)	4

Repechage round 1
Alibek Abdikassymov (KAZ)
Yeldos Kuanyshbay (KAZ)	WO
Tajmuraz Salkazanov (SVK)	5
Murad Kuramagomedov (HUN)	2

Bronze medal match
Yeldos Kuanyshbay (KAZ)	2
Magomedrasul Asluev (BRN)	8
Tajmuraz Salkazanov (SVK)	4
David Carr (USA)	4

==== Men's freestyle 79 kg ====
Round of 32
	Score	
Mikey Labriola (PUR)	0–5	Fariborz Babaei (IRI)

Round of 16
Nurlan Bekzhanov (KAZ)	1
Vladimeri Gamkrelidze (GEO)	10
Fariborz Babaei (IRI)	5
Muhammet Akdeniz (TUR)	0
Daulet Yergesh (KAZ)	0
Luka Chkhitunidze (GEO)	10
Achsarbek Gulajev (SVK)	1
Bolat Sakayev (KAZ)	2
Lucas Kahnt (GER)	1
Magomet Evloev (TJK)	4
Ryunosuke Kamiya (JPN)	6
Chander Mohan (IND)	9
Levi Haines (USA)	10
Khidir Saipudinov (BRN)	5
Georgios Kougioumtsidis (GRE)	12
Zelimkhan Khadjiev (FRA)	1

Quarterfinals
Vladimeri Gamkrelidze (GEO)	4
Fariborz Babaei (IRI)	1
Luka Chkhitunidze (GEO)	5
Bolat Sakayev (KAZ)	8
Magomet Evloev (TJK)	8
Chander Mohan (IND)	8
Levi Haines (USA)	3
Georgios Kougioumtsidis (GRE)	7

Semifinals
Vladimeri Gamkrelidze (GEO)	2
Bolat Sakayev (KAZ)	0
Magomet Evloev (TJK)	2^{F}
Georgios Kougioumtsidis (GRE)	0

Final
Vladimeri Gamkrelidze (GEO)	5
Magomet Evloev (TJK)	0

Repechage round 2
Nurlan Bekzhanov (KAZ)
Fariborz Babaei (IRI)	WO
Lucas Kahnt (GER)	6
Chander Mohan (IND)	5

Bronze medal match
Fariborz Babaei (IRI)	2
Bolat Sakayev (KAZ)	0
Lucas Kahnt (GER)	0
Georgios Kougioumtsidis (GRE)	10

==== Men's freestyle 86 kg ====
Round of 32
	Score	
Patrik Püspöki (HUN)	3–8	Ali Savadkouhi (IRI)

Round of 16
Igor Szucki (POL)	0
Rakhim Magamadov (FRA)	10
Ali Savadkouhi (IRI)	10
Tariel Gaphrindashvili (GEO)	0
Lee Gyeong-yeon (KOR)	0
Nurzhan Issagaliyev (KAZ)	3
Aiden Stevenson (CAN)	0
Mahamedkhabib Kadzimahamedau (UWW)	10
Cezary Sadowski (POL)	0
Boris Makoev (SVK)	3^{F}
Tornike Samkharadze (GEO)
Arsenii Dzhioev (AZE)	WO
Paulius Leščauskas (LTU)	0
Simon Marchl (AUT)	9
Osman Göçen (TUR)	10
Taran Goring (CAN)	0

Quarterfinals
Rakhim Magamadov (FRA)	0
Ali Savadkouhi (IRI)	5
Nurzhan Issagaliyev (KAZ)	1
Mahamedkhabib Kadzimahamedau (UWW)	9
Boris Makoev (SVK)	0
Arsenii Dzhioev (AZE)	3
Simon Marchl (AUT)	2
Osman Göçen (TUR)	9

Semifinals
Ali Savadkouhi (IRI)	3
Mahamedkhabib Kadzimahamedau (UWW)	7^{F}
Arsenii Dzhioev (AZE)	10
Osman Göçen (TUR)	0

Final
Mahamedkhabib Kadzimahamedau (UWW)
Arsenii Dzhioev (AZE)	WO

Repechage round 2
Aiden Stevenson (CAN)	2
Nurzhan Issagaliyev (KAZ)	15
Tornike Samkharadze (GEO)
Boris Makoev (SVK)	WO

Bronze medal match
Nurzhan Issagaliyev (KAZ)	0
Ali Savadkouhi (IRI)	3
Boris Makoev (SVK)	2
Osman Göçen (TUR)	3

==== Men's freestyle 92 kg ====
Round of 16
Trent Hidlay (USA)	7
Abubakr Abakarov (AZE)	2
Osman Nurmagomedov (AZE)	6
Magomed Sharipov (BRN)	1
Arystan Karabek (KAZ)	0
Dauren Kurugliev (GRE)	11^{F}
Alperen Tokgöz (TUR)	6
Ben Honis (ITA)	10
Yaraslau Iadkouski (UWW)	0
Miriani Maisuradze (GEO)	10^{F}
Musza Arsunkaev (HUN)	11
Filip Szucki (POL)	3
Benjamin Greil (AUT)	4
Lars Schäfle (GER)	2

Quarterfinals
Krisztián Angyal (HUN)	0
Trent Hidlay (USA)	10
Osman Nurmagomedov (AZE)	1
Dauren Kurugliev (GRE)	5
Ben Honis (ITA)	0
Miriani Maisuradze (GEO)	8
Musza Arsunkaev (HUN)	7
Benjamin Greil (AUT)	2

Semifinals
Trent Hidlay (USA)	2
Dauren Kurugliev (GRE)	0^{R}
Miriani Maisuradze (GEO)	10
Musza Arsunkaev (HUN)	0

Final
Trent Hidlay (USA)	7
Miriani Maisuradze (GEO)	2

Repechage round 1
Abubakr Abakarov (AZE)	11
Krisztián Angyal (HUN)	0
Yaraslau Iadkouski (UWW)	1
Ben Honis (ITA)	8^{F}

Bronze medal match
Abubakr Abakarov (AZE)	WO
Dauren Kurugliev (GRE)
Ben Honis (ITA)	5^{F}
Musza Arsunkaev (HUN)	5

==== Men's freestyle 97 kg ====
Round of 16
Nurdaulet Bekenov (KAZ)	11
Domantas Pauliuščenko (LTU)	0
Vicky Hooda (IND)	13
Resul Güne (TUR)	3
Jonathan Aiello (USA)	6
Zbigniew Baranowski (POL)	6
Akhmed Tazhudinov (BRN)	14
Adlan Viskhanov (FRA)	2
Richárd Végh (HUN)	3
Aliaksandr Hushtyn (UWW)	5
Bekzat Urkimbay (KAZ)	1
Batyrbek Tsakulov (SVK)	1

Quarterfinals
Seo Ju-hwan (KOR)	5
Nurdaulet Bekenov (KAZ)	4
Vicky Hooda (IND)	5
Zbigniew Baranowski (POL)	7
Akhmed Tazhudinov (BRN)	11
Aliaksandr Hushtyn (UWW)	0
Batyrbek Tsakulov (SVK)	2
Merab Suleimanishvili (GEO)	8

Semifinals
Seo Ju-hwan (KOR)	3
Zbigniew Baranowski (POL)	7
Akhmed Tazhudinov (BRN)	10
Merab Suleimanishvili (GEO)	0

Final
Zbigniew Baranowski (POL)	0
Akhmed Tazhudinov (BRN)	11

Repechage round 1
Jonathan Aiello (USA)	4^{F}
Vicky Hooda (IND)	4
Adlan Viskhanov (FRA)	10
Aliaksandr Hushtyn (UWW)	0

Bronze medal match
Jonathan Aiello (USA)	10
Seo Ju-hwan (KOR)	0
Adlan Viskhanov (FRA)	9
Merab Suleimanishvili (GEO)	4

==== Men's freestyle 125 kg ====
Round of 32
	Score	
Nursultan Azov (KAZ)	9–2	Trent Hillger (USA)
Milán Gellén (HUN)	0–9	Robert Baran (POL)
Giorgi Meshvildishvili (AZE)	WO	Georgi Ivanov (BUL)

Round of 16
Kamil Kościółek (POL)	10
Solomon Manashvili (GEO)	0
Nursultan Azov (KAZ)	1
Alen Khubulov (BUL)	11
Kim Gyeong-min (KOR)	1
Vladislav Baitcaev (HUN)	7
Milán Korcsog (HUN)
Shamil Sharipov (BRN)	WO
Jonovan Smith (PUR)	10
Gabriel Silva (BRA)	2
Robert Baran (POL)	2
Dzianis Khramiankou (UWW)	7
Givi Matcharashvili (GEO)	3^{R}
Georgi Ivanov (BUL)	4
Demetrius Thomas (USA)	10^{F}
Efe Anıl Al (TUR)	0

Quarterfinals
Kamil Kościółek (POL)	2
Alen Khubulov (BUL)	6
Vladislav Baitcaev (HUN)	0
Shamil Sharipov (BRN)	6
Jonovan Smith (PUR)	0
Dzianis Khramiankou (UWW)	10
Georgi Ivanov (BUL)	2
Demetrius Thomas (USA)	9

Semifinals
Alen Khubulov (BUL)	1
Shamil Sharipov (BRN)	5
Dzianis Khramiankou (UWW)	13
Demetrius Thomas (USA)	1

Final
Shamil Sharipov (BRN)	5
Dzianis Khramiankou (UWW)	3

Repechage round 2
Milán Korcsog (HUN)	0
Vladislav Baitcaev (HUN)	4
Robert Baran (POL)	11
Jonovan Smith (PUR)	0

Bronze medal match
Vladislav Baitcaev (HUN)	0
Alen Khubulov (BUL)	3
Robert Baran (POL)	6
Demetrius Thomas (USA)	0

=== Men's Greco-Roman ===
==== Men's Greco-Roman 55 kg ====
Round of 16
Emin Sefershaev (UWW)	7
Artiom Deleanu (MDA)	1
~~Jayden Raney (USA)~~
Denis Mihai (ROU)	WO

Quarterfinals
Anil Mor (IND)	1
Emin Sefershaev (UWW)	6
Ikhtiyor Botirov (UZB)	7
Jasurbek Ortikboev (UZB)	6
Alpamys Dastanbek (KAZ)	1
Brady Koontz (USA)	1
Denis Mihai (ROU)	5
Marlan Mukashev (KAZ)	8

Semifinals
Emin Sefershaev (UWW)	5
Ikhtiyor Botirov (UZB)	5
Alpamys Dastanbek (KAZ)	0
Marlan Mukashev (KAZ)	8

Final
Emin Sefershaev (UWW)	9
Marlan Mukashev (KAZ)	0

Repechage round 1
Artiom Deleanu (MDA)	0
Anil Mor (IND)	7

Bronze medal match
Anil Mor (IND)	7
Ikhtiyor Botirov (UZB)	4
Denis Mihai (ROU)	1
Alpamys Dastanbek (KAZ)	1

==== Men's Greco-Roman 60 kg ====
Round of 32
	Score	
Alisher Ganiev (UZB)	7–1 DSQ	Aidos Sultangali (KAZ)

Round of 16
Galym Kabdunassarov (KAZ)	9
Ilkin Gurbanov (AZE)	1
Alisher Ganiev (UZB)	10
Pridon Abuladze (GEO)	1
Sumit Dalal (IND)	9
Sadyk Lalaev (UWW)	3
Anvar Allakhiarov (UWW)	0
Kim Da-hyun (KOR)	9
Maxwell Black (USA)	1
Mehroj Bahramov (UZB)	7
Nihat Mammadli (AZE)	9
Kim Seung-hak (KOR)	0
Dylan Koontz (USA)	0
Amiran Shavadze (GEO)	8
Georgii Tibilov (SRB)	9
Marat Garipov (BRA)	0

Quarterfinals
Galym Kabdunassarov (KAZ)	6
Alisher Ganiev (UZB)	3
Sumit Dalal (IND)	9^{F}
Kim Da-hyun (KOR)	4
Mehroj Bahramov (UZB)	0
Nihat Mammadli (AZE)	4
Amiran Shavadze (GEO)	5
Georgii Tibilov (SRB)	5

Semifinals
Galym Kabdunassarov (KAZ)	1
Sumit Dalal (IND)	10^{F}
Nihat Mammadli (AZE)	3
Georgii Tibilov (SRB)	2

Final
Sumit Dalal (IND)	1
Nihat Mammadli (AZE)	5

Repechage round 1
Sadyk Lalaev (UWW)	9
Kim Da-hyun (KOR)	0
Kim Seung-hak (KOR)	3
Mehroj Bahramov (UZB)	0^{R}

Bronze medal match
Sadyk Lalaev (UWW)	5
Galym Kabdunassarov (KAZ)	3
Kim Seung-hak (KOR)	2
Georgii Tibilov (SRB)	5

==== Men's Greco-Roman 63 kg ====
Round of 16
Vitalie Eriomenco (MDA)	5
Dinislam Bammatov (UWW)	5
Yerkebulan Ardakov (KAZ)	0
Karen Aslanyan (ARM)	9
Sergey Emelin (UWW)	4
Yerzhet Zharlykassyn (KAZ)	0
Islomjon Bakhromov (UZB)	3
Ziya Babashov (AZE)	3

Quarterfinals
Ivan Lizatović (CRO)	5
Vitalie Eriomenco (MDA)	5
Karen Aslanyan (ARM)	8
Ellis Coleman (USA)	1
Aytjan Khalmakhanov (UZB)	0
Sergey Emelin (UWW)	9
Islomjon Bakhromov (UZB)	WO
Kerem Kamal (TUR)

Semifinals
Vitalie Eriomenco (MDA)	6
Karen Aslanyan (ARM)	3
Sergey Emelin (UWW)	5
Islomjon Bakhromov (UZB)	1^{R}

Final
Vitalie Eriomenco (MDA)	0
Sergey Emelin (UWW)	5

Repechage round 1
Dinislam Bammatov (UWW)	4
Ivan Lizatović (CRO)	0
Yerzhet Zharlykassyn (KAZ)	8
Aytjan Khalmakhanov (UZB)	7

Bronze medal match
Dinislam Bammatov (UWW)	10
Karen Aslanyan (ARM)	0
Yerzhet Zharlykassyn (KAZ)	WO
Islomjon Bakhromov (UZB)

==== Men's Greco-Roman 67 kg ====
Round of 32
	Score	
Neeraj Chhikara (IND)	0–7	Ruslan Bichurin (UWW)
Damir Ibrashov (KAZ)	0–8	Otto Black (USA)
Håvard Jørgensen (NOR)	1–1	Joni Khetsuriani (GEO)
Kwon Min-seong (KOR)	WO	Murat Fırat (TUR)
Alston Nutter (USA)	9–0	Jeong Yeon-woo (KOR)

Round of 16
Shermukhammad Sharibjanov (UZB)	1
Daniial Agaev (UWW)	5
Ruslan Bichurin (UWW)	1
Morten Thoresen (NOR)	1
Dinmukhamed Koshkar (KAZ)	5^{F}
Otto Black (USA)	0
Joni Khetsuriani (GEO)	9
Dominik Etlinger (CRO)	0
Sultan Assetuly (KAZ)	5
Maksim Novichikhin (UWW)	9
Kwon Min-seong (KOR)	7
Valentin Petic (MDA)	9
Leri Abuladze (GEO)	8
Alston Nutter (USA)	3
Seo Byeong-gi (KOR)	0
Farid Khalilov (AZE)	6

Quarterfinals
Daniial Agaev (UWW)	8
Morten Thoresen (NOR)	0
Dinmukhamed Koshkar (KAZ)	0
Joni Khetsuriani (GEO)	7
Maksim Novichikhin (UWW)
Valentin Petic (MDA)	WO
Leri Abuladze (GEO)	1
Farid Khalilov (AZE)	1

Semifinals
Daniial Agaev (UWW)	0
Joni Khetsuriani (GEO)	9
Valentin Petic (MDA)	5
Leri Abuladze (GEO)	3

Final
Joni Khetsuriani (GEO)	7
Valentin Petic (MDA)	0

Repechage round 1
Håvard Jørgensen (NOR)	8
Dominik Etlinger (CRO)	0

Repechage round 2
Håvard Jørgensen (NOR)	8
Dinmukhamed Koshkar (KAZ)	1
Kwon Min-seong (KOR)	WO
Maksim Novichikhin (UWW)

Bronze medal match
Håvard Jørgensen (NOR)	1
Daniial Agaev (UWW)	1
Kwon Min-seong (KOR)	3
Leri Abuladze (GEO)	10

==== Men's Greco-Roman 72 kg ====
Round of 32
	Score	
Danil Grigorev (UWW)	1–12	Madiyar Maulitkanov (KAZ)
Abror Atabaev (UZB)	2–6	Narek Oganian (UWW)

Round of 16
Hasrat Jafarov (AZE)	2
Ali Arsalan (SRB)	1
Madiyar Maulitkanov (KAZ)	7
Aliaksandr Kikiniou (USA)	2
Mihai Petic (MDA)	7
Ankit Gulia (IND)	2
Otar Abuladze (GEO)	0
Abdullo Aliev (UZB)	10^{F}
Iuri Lomadze (GEO)	9
Sebastian Aak (NOR)	0
Daniyar Kalenov (KAZ)	1
Ruslan Nurullayev (AZE)	5
Furkan Yıldız (TUR)	9
Narek Oganian (UWW)	0
Mehmet Mustafa Şahin (TUR)	2
Giorgi Chkhikvadze (GEO)	6

Quarterfinals
Hasrat Jafarov (AZE)	5
Madiyar Maulitkanov (KAZ)	3
Mihai Petic (MDA)	2
Abdullo Aliev (UZB)	8
Iuri Lomadze (GEO)	10
Ruslan Nurullayev (AZE)	0
Furkan Yıldız (TUR)	0
Giorgi Chkhikvadze (GEO)	11

Semifinals
Hasrat Jafarov (AZE)	3
Abdullo Aliev (UZB)	5
Iuri Lomadze (GEO)	1
Giorgi Chkhikvadze (GEO)	1

Final
Abdullo Aliev (UZB)	2
Iuri Lomadze (GEO)	8

Repechage round 2
Otar Abuladze (GEO)	10
Mihai Petic (MDA)	0
Sebastian Aak (NOR)	4
Ruslan Nurullayev (AZE)	6

Bronze medal match
Otar Abuladze (GEO)	WO
Hasrat Jafarov (AZE)
Ruslan Nurullayev (AZE)	9
Giorgi Chkhikvadze (GEO)	0

==== Men's Greco-Roman 77 kg ====
Round of 32
	Score	
Róbert Fritsch (HUN)	9–0	Nishant Phogat (IND)
Stoyan Kubatov (BUL)	5–3	Attila Tösmagi (HUN)
Calebe Correa (BRA)	2–10	Alexandru Solovei (MDA)
Albin Olofsson (SWE)	1–5	Yunus Emre Başar (TUR)
Antonio Kamenjašević (CRO)	1–1	Ulvu Ganizade (AZE)
Aleksa Ilić (SRB)	0–4	Sanan Suleymanov (AZE)
Aram Vardanyan (UZB)	3–3	Doniyorkhon Nakibov (UZB)
Ramaz Zoidze (GEO)	WO	Sergey Kutuzov (UWW)

Round of 16
Kang Bo-seong (KOR)	0
Róbert Fritsch (HUN)	4
Stoyan Kubatov (BUL)	3
Yeldos Kamelov (KAZ)	1
Ahmet Yılmaz (TUR)	5
Alexandru Solovei (MDA)	3
Yunus Emre Başar (TUR)	0
Sergey Stepanov (UWW)	8
Kang Hyeon-jin (KOR)	3
Ulvu Ganizade (AZE)	3
Sanan Suleymanov (AZE)	8
Alexandrin Guțu (MDA)	0
Kamal Bey (USA)
Aram Vardanyan (UZB)	WO
Sergey Kutuzov (UWW)	3
Levente Lévai (HUN)	1

Quarterfinals
Róbert Fritsch (HUN)	4
Stoyan Kubatov (BUL)	1
Ahmet Yılmaz (TUR)	3
Sergey Stepanov (UWW)	9^{F}
Ulvu Ganizade (AZE)
Sanan Suleymanov (AZE)	WO
Aram Vardanyan (UZB)	0
Sergey Kutuzov (UWW)	9

Semifinals
Róbert Fritsch (HUN)	6
Sergey Stepanov (UWW)	3
Sanan Suleymanov (AZE)	6
Sergey Kutuzov (UWW)	8

Final
Róbert Fritsch (HUN)	2
Sergey Kutuzov (UWW)	5

Repechage round 1
Nishant Phogat (IND)	0
Kang Bo-seong (KOR)	4
Ramaz Zoidze (GEO)
Levente Lévai (HUN)	WO

Repechage round 2
Kang Bo-seong (KOR)	2
Stoyan Kubatov (BUL)	3
Levente Lévai (HUN)	4
Aram Vardanyan (UZB)	1

Bronze medal match
Stoyan Kubatov (BUL)	1
Sergey Stepanov (UWW)	7
Levente Lévai (HUN)	3
Sanan Suleymanov (AZE)	2

==== Men's Greco-Roman 82 kg ====
Round of 32
	Score	
Mihail Bradu (MDA)	WO	~~Gurban Gurbanov (AZE)~~
Filip Šačić (CRO)	0–9	Dias Kalen (KAZ)
Samvel Grigoryan (ARM)	4–0	Islam Aliev (UWW)
Song Ji-hyeok (KOR)	10–3	Waltteri Latvala (FIN)
Shamil Ozhaev (KAZ)	4–5	Samandar Bobonazarov (UZB)
Karlo Kodrić (CRO)	2–5	Zoltán Lévai (HUN)
Szabolcs Szinay (HUN)	4–12	Burhan Akbudak (TUR)
Almir Tolebayev (KAZ)	1–3	Beka Melelashvili (USA)

Round of 16
Rafael Iunusov (UWW)	9
Mihail Bradu (MDA)	4
Dias Kalen (KAZ)	9
Uroš Lečić (SRB)	0
Jalgasbay Berdimuratov (UZB)	7
Samvel Grigoryan (ARM)	1
Song Ji-hyeok (KOR)	0
Adlet Tiuliubaev (UWW)	9
Erik Szilvássy (HUN)	5
Samandar Bobonazarov (UZB)	1
Zoltán Lévai (HUN)	5
Gela Bolkvadze (GEO)	1
Deyvid Dimitrov (BUL)	0
Burhan Akbudak (TUR)	9
Beka Melelashvili (USA)	9
Antal Vamoš (SRB)	0

Quarterfinals
Rafael Iunusov (UWW)	1
Dias Kalen (KAZ)	1
Jalgasbay Berdimuratov (UZB)	1
Adlet Tiuliubaev (UWW)	2
Erik Szilvássy (HUN)	1
Zoltán Lévai (HUN)	1
Burhan Akbudak (TUR)	1^{R}
Beka Melelashvili (USA)	3

Semifinals
Rafael Iunusov (UWW)	1
Adlet Tiuliubaev (UWW)	5
Zoltán Lévai (HUN)	4
Beka Melelashvili (USA)	3

Final
Adlet Tiuliubaev (UWW)	5
Zoltán Lévai (HUN)	1

Repechage round 1
Karlo Kodrić (CRO)	WO
~~Gela Bolkvadze (GEO)~~

Repechage round 2
Song Ji-hyeok (KOR)	0
Jalgasbay Berdimuratov (UZB)	9
Karlo Kodrić (CRO)	1
Erik Szilvássy (HUN)	2

Bronze medal match
Jalgasbay Berdimuratov (UZB)	2
Rafael Iunusov (UWW)	1
Erik Szilvássy (HUN)	2
Beka Melelashvili (USA)	1

==== Men's Greco-Roman 87 kg ====
Round of 32
	Score	
Alan Ostaev (UWW)	WO	Nursultan Tursynov (KAZ)
Patrik Gordan (ROU)	1–3	Bachir Sid Azara (ALG)
Milad Alirzaev (ANA)	5–1	Ivan Huklek (CRO)
Mukhammadkodir Rasulov (UZB)	9–0	Karan Kamboj (IND)
Exauce Mukubu (NOR)	4–1	Payton Jacobson (USA)
Islam Abbasov (AZE)	3–1	István Takács (HUN)
Aleksandr Komarov (SRB)	1–3	Dávid Losonczi (HUN)
Lee Seung-hwan (KOR)	9–0	Kauan Gomes (BRA)

Round of 16
Park Sang-hyeok (KOR)	0
Alan Ostaev (UWW)	8
Bachir Sid Azara (ALG)	1
Turpal Bisultanov (DEN)	4
Tamás Lévai (HUN)	4
Milad Alirzaev (UWW)	3
Mukhammadkodir Rasulov (UZB)	3
Matej Mandić (CRO)	3
Aues Gonibov (UWW)	1
Exauce Mukubu (NOR)	3
Islam Abbasov (AZE)	0
Marcel Sterkenburg (NED)	2^{R}
Andrija Mihajlović (SRB)	1
Dávid Losonczi (HUN)	6
Lee Seung-hwan (KOR)	0
Islam Yevloyev (KAZ)	9

Quarterfinals
Alan Ostaev (UWW)	0
Turpal Bisultanov (DEN)	8
Tamás Lévai (HUN)	1
Mukhammadkodir Rasulov (UZB)	1
Exauce Mukubu (NOR)	1
Islam Abbasov (AZE)	1
Dávid Losonczi (HUN)	9
Islam Yevloyev (KAZ)	5

Semifinals
Turpal Bisultanov (DEN)	7
Tamás Lévai (HUN)	2
Islam Abbasov (AZE)	0
Dávid Losonczi (HUN)	4

Final
Turpal Bisultanov (DEN)	WO
Dávid Losonczi (HUN)

Repechage round 1
Aleksandr Komarov (SRB)	3
Andrija Mihajlović (SRB)	1

Repechage round 2
Bachir Sid Azara (ALG)	0
Alan Ostaev (UWW)	8
Aleksandr Komarov (SRB)	3
Islam Yevloyev (KAZ)	2

Bronze medals
Alan Ostaev (UWW)	2
Tamás Lévai (HUN)	5
Aleksandr Komarov (SRB)	2
Islam Abbasov (AZE)	5

==== Men's Greco-Roman 97 kg ====
Round of 32
	Score	
Arvi Savolainen (FIN)	10–0	Kim Seung-jun (KOR)
Tomislav Brkan (CRO)	0–9	Hayk Khloyan (ARM)
Lee Min-ho (KOR)	2–4 Fall	Abdikodir Jalilov (UZB)
Ilia Ermolenko (UWW)	5–1	Filip Smetko (CRO)
Nitesh Siwach (IND)	0–9	Arif Niftullayev (AZE)
Abdulkadir Çebi (TUR)	1–3	Murad Ahmadiyev (AZE)
Kristian Lukač (CRO)	2–3	Luka Katić (SRB)

Round of 16
Artur Sargsian (UWW)	6
Alex Szőke (HUN)	6
Arvi Savolainen (FIN)	5
Magomed Murtazaliev (UWW)	3
Markus Ragginger (AUT)	2
Hayk Khloyan (ARM)	3
Abdikodir Jalilov (UZB)	9
Vendel Vitai (HUN)	1
Giorgi Melia (GEO)	7
Ilia Ermolenko (UWW)	2
Arif Niftullayev (AZE)	2
Iussuf Matsiyev (KAZ)	2
Uroš Krstin (SRB)	0
Murad Ahmadiyev (AZE)	9
Luka Katić (SRB)	1
Giorgi Katsanashvili (GEO)	4

Quarterfinals
Alex Szőke (HUN)	3
Arvi Savolainen (FIN)	4
Hayk Khloyan (ARM)	8
Abdikodir Jalilov (UZB)	0
Giorgi Melia (GEO)	4^{F}
Arif Niftullayev (AZE)	0
Murad Ahmadiyev (AZE)	8
Giorgi Katsanashvili (GEO)	0

Semifinals
Arvi Savolainen (FIN)	4
Hayk Khloyan (ARM)	5
Giorgi Melia (GEO)	5
Murad Ahmadiyev (AZE)	1

Final
Hayk Khloyan (ARM)	1
Giorgi Melia (GEO)	3

Repechage round 1
Tomislav Brkan (CRO)	1
Markus Ragginger (AUT)	5

Repechage round 2
Markus Ragginger (AUT)	9
Abdikodir Jalilov (UZB)	0
Ilia Ermolenko (UWW)	3
Arif Niftullayev (AZE)	3

Bronze medal match
Markus Ragginger (AUT)	6
Arvi Savolainen (FIN)	3
Ilia Ermolenko (UWW)	4
Murad Ahmadiyev (AZE)	8

==== Men's Greco-Roman 130 kg ====
Round of 16
Mikheil Kajaia (SRB)	1
Cohlton Schultz (USA)	5
Alimkhan Syzdykov (KAZ)	10
Heiki Nabi (EST)	0
Hamza Bakır (TUR)	3
Marat Kamparov (UWW)	4
Sarkhan Mammadov (AZE)	9
Aden Attao (USA)	0
Courtney Freeman (USA)	9^{F}
Assylbek Abdikalyk (KAZ)	1
Lee Seung-chan (KOR)	0
Beka Kandelaki (AZE)	9
Koppány László (HUN)	1
Dáriusz Vitek (HUN)	3

Quarterfinals
Elias Kuosmanen (FIN)	2
Cohlton Schultz (USA)	1
Alimkhan Syzdykov (KAZ)	1
Marat Kamparov (UWW)	1
Sarkhan Mammadov (AZE)	4
Courtney Freeman (USA)	3
Beka Kandelaki (AZE)	3
Dáriusz Vitek (HUN)	3

Semifinals
Elias Kuosmanen (FIN)	1
Marat Kamparov (UWW)	3
Sarkhan Mammadov (AZE)	0
Dáriusz Vitek (HUN)	2^{F}

Final
Marat Kamparov (UWW)	3
Dáriusz Vitek (HUN)	1

Repechage round 1
Hamza Bakır (TUR)
Alimkhan Syzdykov (KAZ)	WO
Koppány László (HUN)	WO
Beka Kandelaki (AZE)

Bronze medal match
Alimkhan Syzdykov (KAZ)	5
Elias Kuosmanen (FIN)	3
Koppány László (HUN)	2
Sarkhan Mammadov (AZE)	1

== See also ==
- 2025 Polyák Imre & Varga János Memorial Tournament – Women's freestyle
