= Igali =

Igali may refer to:

== People ==
- Daniel Igali (born 1974), Canadian freestyle wrestler
- Godknows Igali, Nigerian public servant, diplomat, author and scholar

== Places ==
- Igali, Republic of Dagestan, Russia
