= 2025 U23 World Wrestling Championships – Men's Greco-Roman 97 kg =

Wrestling competitions

Men's Greco-Roman 97 kg at the 2025 U23 World Championships
- Venue: SPC Vojvodina
- Dates: 21–22 October
- Competitors: 24 from 22 nations

Medalists
gold medal	Yehor Yakushenko	Ukraine
silver medal	Iussuf Matsiyev	Kazakhstan
bronze medal	Richard Karelson	Estonia
bronze medal	Maksim Averin

The men's Greco-Roman 97 kilograms is a competition featured at the 2025 U23 World Wrestling Championships, and was held in Novi Sad, Serbia on 21 and 22 October 2025.

This Greco-Roman wrestling competition consists of a single-elimination tournament, with a repechage used to determine the winner of two bronze medals. The two finalists face off for gold and silver medals. Each wrestler who loses to one of the two finalists moves into the repechage, culminating in a pair of bronze medal matches featuring the semifinal losers each facing the remaining repechage opponent from their half of the bracket.

== Results ==
Legend

- F — Won by fall

=== Final ===
Final
Yehor Yakushenko (UKR)	6
Iussuf Matsiyev (KAZ)	1

=== Top half ===
Round of 32
Muhittin Helvacı (TUR)	9^{F}
Ilia Cernovol (MDA)	0
Javokhir Shodiyarov (UZB)	0
Richard Karelson (EST)	9
Mohammad Hadi Seydi (IRI)	11
Dorian Trejo (MEX)	0
Luka Gabisonia (GEO)	11
Yang Zichen (CHN)	3

Round of 16
Aapo Viitala (FIN)	4^{F}
Muhittin Helvacı (TUR)	5
Richard Karelson (EST)	8
Nurmanbet Raimaly Uulu (KGZ)	0
Abubakar Khaslakhanau (UWW)	9
Mohammad Hadi Seydi (IRI)	1
Luka Gabisonia (GEO)	0
Yehor Yakushenko (UKR)	8

Quarterfinals
Aapo Viitala (FIN)	0
Richard Karelson (EST)	6
Abubakar Khaslakhanau (UWW)	3
Yehor Yakushenko (UKR)	3

Semifinals
Richard Karelson (EST)	3
Yehor Yakushenko (UKR)	6

=== Bottom half ===
Round of 32
Juan Díaz (VEN)	3
Darius Kiefer (GER)	5
Ali Guliyev (AZE)	1
Maksim Averin (UWW)	5
Naman (IND)	0
Arshak Geghamyan (ARM)	9
Kyo Kitawaki (JPN)	12
Max Ramberg (USA)	1

Round of 16
Tomislav Brkan (CRO)	4
Darius Kiefer (GER)	7
Maksim Averin (UWW)	9
Mihail Melehov (BUL)	0
Uroš Krstin (SRB)	4
Arshak Geghamyan (ARM)	5
Kyo Kitawaki (JPN)	1
Iussuf Matsiyev (KAZ)	2

Quarterfinals
Darius Kiefer (GER)	1
Maksim Averin (UWW)	3
Arshak Geghamyan (ARM)	0
Iussuf Matsiyev (KAZ)	4

Semifinals
Maksim Averin (UWW)	1
Iussuf Matsiyev (KAZ)	9

=== Repechage ===
Repechage round 2
Luka Gabisonia (GEO)	2
Abubakar Khaslakhanau (UWW)	11
Kyo Kitawaki (JPN)	0
Arshak Geghamyan (ARM)	4^{F}

Bronze medals
Abubakar Khaslakhanau (UWW)	7
Richard Karelson (EST)	7
Arshak Geghamyan (ARM)	1
Maksim Averin (UWW)	1

== Final standing ==
Rank	Athlete
1st place, gold medalist(s)	Yehor Yakushenko (UKR)
2nd place, silver medalist(s)	Iussuf Matsiyev (KAZ)
3rd place, bronze medalist(s)	Richard Karelson (EST)
3rd place, bronze medalist(s)	Maksim Averin (UWW)
5	Abubakar Khaslakhanau (UWW)
5	Arshak Geghamyan (ARM)
7	Darius Kiefer (GER)
8	Muhittin Helvacı (TUR)
9	Aapo Viitala (FIN)
10	Kyo Kitawaki (JPN)
11	Luka Gabisonia (GEO)
12	Mohammad Hadi Seydi (IRI)
13	Uroš Krstin (SRB)
14	Tomislav Brkan (CRO)
15	Juan Díaz (VEN)
16	Yang Zichen (CHN)
17	Ali Guliyev (AZE)
18	Max Ramberg (USA)
19	Nurmanbet Raimaly Uulu (KGZ)
20	Ilia Cernovol (MDA)
21	Javokhir Shodiyarov (UZB)
22	Mihail Melehov (BUL)
23	Naman (IND)
24	Dorian Trejo (MEX)
