= 2023 U23 World Wrestling Championships – Men's Greco-Roman 87 kg =

Wrestling competitions

Men's Greco-Roman 87 kg at the 2023 U23 World Championships
- Venue: Tirana Olympic Park
- Dates: 28–29 October
- Competitors: 21 from 18 nations

Medalists
gold medal	Magomed Murtazaliev	Authorised Neutral Athletes
silver medal	Matej Mandić	Croatia
bronze medal	Szymon Szymonowicz	Poland
bronze medal	István Takács	Hungary

The men's Greco-Roman 87 kilograms is a competition featured at the 2023 U23 World Wrestling Championships, and was held in Tirana, Albania on 28 and 29 October 2023.

This Greco-Roman wrestling competition consists of a single-elimination tournament, with a repechage used to determine the winner of two bronze medals. The two finalists face off for gold and silver medals. Each wrestler who loses to one of the two finalists moves into the repechage, culminating in a pair of bronze medal matches featuring the semifinal losers each facing the remaining repechage opponent from their half of the bracket.

== Results ==
Legend

- F — Won by fall

=== Final ===
Final
Matej Mandić (CRO)	4
Magomed Murtazaliev (ANA)	13^{F}

=== Top half ===
Round of 32
Michael Altomer (USA)	4
Matej Mandić (CRO)	12
Manoj Kumar (UWW)	10
Kaito Miyamoto (JPN)	0
Maksat Sailau (KAZ)	6
Asan Zhanyshov (KGZ)	6^{F}

Round of 16
Christian Zemp (SUI)	0
Szymon Szymonowicz (POL)	8
Matej Mandić (CRO)	9
Samvel Sargsyan (ARM)	0
Waltteri Latvala (FIN)	8
Manoj Kumar (UWW)	0
Asan Zhanyshov (KGZ)	6
Achiko Bolkvadze (GEO)	3

Quarterfinals
Szymon Szymonowicz (POL)	2
Matej Mandić (CRO)	10
Waltteri Latvala (FIN)	9
Asan Zhanyshov (KGZ)	7

Semifinals
Matej Mandić (CRO)	11
Waltteri Latvala (FIN)	0

=== Bottom half ===
Round of 32
Ivan Manov (BUL)	0
Magomed Murtazaliev (ANA)	9
Mykyta Alieksieiev (UKR)	1
Exauce Mukubu (NOR)	9

Round of 16
Hamza Sertcanli (SWE)	0
István Takács (HUN)	7
Magomed Murtazaliev (ANA)	8
Muhittin Sarıçiçek (TUR)	7
Evangelos Boukis (GRE)	0
Exauce Mukubu (NOR)	10
Mahammad Ahmadiyev (AZE)	6
Vasili Buhlak (ANA)	1

Quarterfinals
István Takács (HUN)	1
Magomed Murtazaliev (ANA)	6
Exauce Mukubu (NOR)	10
Mahammad Ahmadiyev (AZE)	0

Semifinals
Magomed Murtazaliev (ANA)	7
Exauce Mukubu (NOR)	2

=== Repechage ===
Repechage round 1
Michael Altomer (USA)	0
Samvel Sargsyan (ARM)	10
Ivan Manov (BUL)	0
Muhittin Sarıçiçek (TUR)	9

Repechage round 2
Samvel Sargsyan (ARM)	0
Szymon Szymonowicz (POL)	8
Muhittin Sarıçiçek (TUR)	1
István Takács (HUN)	3^{F}

Bronze medals
Szymon Szymonowicz (POL)	9
Waltteri Latvala (FIN)	0
István Takács (HUN)	2
Exauce Mukubu (NOR)	1
