= 2021 European Cadets Wrestling Championships =

- Host city: Samokov, Bulgaria
- Dates: June 14–20, 2021

Champions
- Freestyle: Russia
- Greco-Roman: Azerbaijan
- Women: Russia

The 2021 European Cadets Wrestling Championships (U17) was the 23rd edition of European Cadets Wrestling Championship of combined events, and took place from June 14 to 20 in Samokov, Bulgaria.

== Medal table ==
Rank	Nation	Gold	Silver	Bronze	Total
1	Russia	10	5	7	22
2	Ukraine	6	2	6	14
3	Azerbaijan	4	3	5	12
4	Armenia	2	2	5	9
5	Belarus	2	1	6	9
6	Georgia	1	4	7	12
7	Moldova	1	2	1	4
8	Hungary	1	1	4	6
9	Romania	1	1	3	5
10	Bulgaria	1	1	1	3
11	France	1	0	2	3
12	Turkey	0	4	7	11
13	Germany	0	2	1	3
13	Poland	0	2	1	3
15	Belgium	0	0	1	1
15	Italy	0	0	1	1
15	Switzerland	0	0	1	1
Totals (17 entries)		30	30	59	119

== Team ranking ==
Rank	Men's freestyle		Men's Greco-Roman		Women's freestyle	
Rank	Team	Points	Team	Points	Team	Points
1	Russia	213	Azerbaijan	153	Russia	179
2	Armenia	138	Georgia	132	Ukraine	155
3	Georgia	122	Ukraine	110	Belarus	155
4	Azerbaijan	107	Russia	107	Turkey	98
5	Ukraine	93	Turkey	100	Romania	87

== Medal summary ==
=== Men's freestyle ===
Event	Gold	Silver	Bronze
45 kg	(Russia) Akhmad Galaev	(Armenia) Huyko Gasparyan	(Ukraine) Oleksandr Hryhoryshyn
45 kg	(Russia) Akhmad Galaev	(Armenia) Huyko Gasparyan	(Azerbaijan) Yusif Isparov
48 kg	(Russia) Amal Dzhandubaev	(Azerbaijan) Musa Verdiyev	(Armenia) Sargis Begoyan
48 kg	(Russia) Amal Dzhandubaev	(Azerbaijan) Musa Verdiyev	(Ukraine) Vitalii Honchar
51 kg	(Russia) razman dzhandubaev	(Azerbaijan) Javid Javadov	(Armenia) Tigran Buniatyan
51 kg	(Russia) razman dzhandubaev	(Azerbaijan) Javid Javadov	(France) Seyfulla Itaev
55 kg	(Armenia) Andranik Avetisyann	(Georgia (country)) Tamazi Sulamanidze	(Turkey) Abdullah Topak
55 kg	(Armenia) Andranik Avetisyann	(Georgia (country)) Tamazi Sulamanidze	(Russia) Anzor Mazhidov
60 kg	(Russia) Adam Arkhiev	(Azerbaijan) Abdulrahman Ibrahimov	(Romania) Daniel Sandu
60 kg	(Russia) Adam Arkhiev	(Azerbaijan) Abdulrahman Ibrahimov	(Georgia (country)) Giorgi Abulashvili
65 kg	(Russia) Marat Fadzaev	(Moldova) Laurentiu Marcu	(Georgia (country)) Giorgi Gogritchiani
65 kg	(Russia) Marat Fadzaev	(Moldova) Laurentiu Marcu	(Armenia) Anushavan Barseghyan
71 kg	(Armenia) Aren Israyelyan	(Russia) Alu Dukhaev	(Turkey) Cengizhan Doğan
71 kg	(Armenia) Aren Israyelyan	(Russia) Alu Dukhaev	(Georgia (country)) Giorgi Natobidze
80 kg	(Ukraine) Oleksandr Mamrosh	(Georgia (country)) Tornike Samkharadze	(Armenia) Narek Grigoryann
80 kg	(Ukraine) Oleksandr Mamrosh	(Georgia (country)) Tornike Samkharadze	(Germany) Daniel Fischer
92 kg	(Russia) Kantemir Suanov	(Bulgaria) Sali Saliev	(Georgia (country)) Tamaz Nikoleishvili
92 kg	(Russia) Kantemir Suanov	(Bulgaria) Sali Saliev	(Turkey) Rıfat Gıdak
110 kg	(France) Levan Lagvilava	(Russia) Ilia Zhibalov	(Turkey) Hakan Büyükçıngıl
110 kg	(France) Levan Lagvilava	(Russia) Ilia Zhibalov	(Hungary) Milán Gellén

=== Men's Greco-Roman ===
Event	Gold	Silver	Bronze
45 kg	(Azerbaijan) Rahim Hasanov	(Ukraine) Nikita Dementiev	(Turkey) Sercan Kesgin
45 kg	(Azerbaijan) Rahim Hasanov	(Ukraine) Nikita Dementiev	(Georgia (country)) Anri Khozrevanidze
48 kg	(Azerbaijan) Faraim Mustafayev	(Turkey) Servet Angı	(Moldova) Maxim Sarmanov
48 kg	(Azerbaijan) Faraim Mustafayev	(Turkey) Servet Angı	(Russia) Kazbek Tarkanov
51 kg	(Bulgaria) Borislav Kirilov	(Georgia (country)) Tamazi Glonti	(Armenia) Gaspar Terteryan
51 kg	(Bulgaria) Borislav Kirilov	(Georgia (country)) Tamazi Glonti	(Azerbaijan) Parviz Dadashov
55 kg	(Azerbaijan) Farid Bakhishli	(Armenia) Armen Sukiasyan	(Russia) Konstantin Savchuk
55 kg	(Azerbaijan) Farid Bakhishli	(Armenia) Armen Sukiasyan	(Turkey) Berati İnaç
60 kg	(Azerbaijan) Farid Khalilov	(Hungary) Levente Lévai	(Georgia (country)) Rati Khozrevanidze
60 kg	(Azerbaijan) Farid Khalilov	(Hungary) Levente Lévai	(Romania) Iulian Lungu
65 kg	(Ukraine) Imed Khudzhadze	(Georgia (country)) Anri Putkaradze	(Azerbaijan) Kanan Abdullazade
65 kg	(Ukraine) Imed Khudzhadze	(Georgia (country)) Anri Putkaradze	(Romania) Iosif Ionescu
71 kg	(Moldova) Alexandru Solovei	(Turkey) Alperen Berber	(Azerbaijan) Ruslan Nurullayev
71 kg	(Moldova) Alexandru Solovei	(Turkey) Alperen Berber	(Belgium) Ibrahim Tabaev
80 kg	(Georgia (country)) Achiko Bolkvadze	(Moldova) Mihai Gutu	(Ukraine) Ivan Tsybanev
80 kg	(Georgia (country)) Achiko Bolkvadze	(Moldova) Mihai Gutu	(Belarus) Maksim Masiukevich
92 kg	(Ukraine) Vladyslav Lub	(Russia) Timur Chernyshev	(Georgia (country)) Gor Ayvazyan
92 kg	(Ukraine) Vladyslav Lub	(Russia) Timur Chernyshev	(Belarus) Abubakar Khaslakhanau
110 kg	(Russia) Daniil Chasovnikov	(Germany) Nikita Ovsjanikov	(Belarus) Daniil Kazlou
110 kg	(Russia) Daniil Chasovnikov	(Germany) Nikita Ovsjanikov	(Ukraine) Artur Boichuk

=== Women's freestyle ===
Event	Gold	Silver	Bronze
40 kg	(Ukraine) Anastasiia Polska	(Romania) Alexandra Voiculescu	(Russia) Tana Tiuliush
40 kg	(Ukraine) Anastasiia Polska	(Romania) Alexandra Voiculescu	None awarded
43 kg	(Russia) Milena Vinogradova	(Germany) Martha Frank	(Ukraine) Yelyzaveta Kulakivska
43 kg	(Russia) Milena Vinogradova	(Germany) Martha Frank	(Bulgaria) Krasimira Dimitrova
46 kg	(Belarus) Sviatlana Katenka	(Russia) Sofia Fedorchenko	(Hungary) Kornelia Laszlo
46 kg	(Belarus) Sviatlana Katenka	(Russia) Sofia Fedorchenko	(Azerbaijan) Zenfira Hashimova
49 kg	(Ukraine) Mariia Yefremova	(Turkey) Sevim Akbaş	(Poland) Nikola Wisniewska
49 kg	(Ukraine) Mariia Yefremova	(Turkey) Sevim Akbaş	(Switzerland) Svenja Jungo
53 kg	(Russia) Natalia Khramenkova	(Turkey) Tuba Demir	(Belarus) Volha Hardzei
53 kg	(Russia) Natalia Khramenkova	(Turkey) Tuba Demir	(Italy) Immacolata Danise
57 kg	(Romania) Georgiana Lirca	(Russia) Angelina Pervukhina	(Ukraine) Yuliia Pakhniuk
57 kg	(Romania) Georgiana Lirca	(Russia) Angelina Pervukhina	(Belarus) Uladzislava Kudzin
61 kg	(Ukraine) Iryna Bondar	(Belarus) Kseniya Tsiarenia	(Turkey) Büşra Efe
61 kg	(Ukraine) Iryna Bondar	(Belarus) Kseniya Tsiarenia	(Russia) Victoria Khusainova
65 kg	(Hungary) Enikő Elekes	(Ukraine) Daria Konstantinova	(Russia) Alisa Chernyshkova
65 kg	(Hungary) Enikő Elekes	(Ukraine) Daria Konstantinova	(Belarus) Aliaksandra Zhuk
69 kg	(Belarus) Victoria Radzkova	(Poland) Karolina Jaworska	(Russia) Alina Rybkina
69 kg	(Belarus) Victoria Radzkova	(Poland) Karolina Jaworska	(Hungary) Noémi Nagy
73 kg	(Russia) Mariia Akulincheva	(Poland) Patrycja Cuber	(Hungary) Veronika Nyikos
73 kg	(Russia) Mariia Akulincheva	(Poland) Patrycja Cuber	(France) Ambre Chevreau
