= Magomed Murtazaliev =

Russian Greco-Roman wrestler (born 2001)

Personal information
- Native name: Магомед Абдулаевич Муртазалиев
- Full name: Magomed Abdulaevitch Murtazaliev
- Nationality: (Russia) Russian
- Born: 27 March 2001 (age 25) Igali, Republic of Dagestan, Russia

Sport
- Country: Russia
- Sport: Wrestling
- Weight class: 87kg 97kg (2024)
- Rank: Master of sports
- Event: Greco-Roman
- Club: Spartak (Makhachkala, Dagestan)
- Coached by: Artur Kuramagomedov; Magomed Magomedaliev
Medal record
Men's Greco-Roman
Representing Individual Neutral Athletes
European Championships
Silver medal – second place	2024 Bucharest	97 kg
U23 World Championships
Gold medal – first place	2023 Tirana	87 kg
Bronze medal – third place	2024 Tirana	97 kg
U23 European Championships
Gold medal – first place	2024 Baku	97 kg
Representing Russia
CIS Games
Gold medal – first place	2023 Salihorsk	87 kg
World Military Championships
Silver medal – second place	2024 Yerevan	97 kg
Representing Dagestan
Russian National Championships
Bronze medal – third place	2023 Ufa	87 kg
All-Russian Spartakiad
Bronze medal – third place	2022 Kazan	87 kg

Magomed Abdulaevitch Murtazaliev (Russian: Магомед Абдулаевич Муртазалиев; born 27 March 2001) is a Russian Greco-Roman wrestler of Avar heritage, who competes at 87 kilograms. He is the 2024 European Championships runner-up, U23 2023 world champion and senior 2023 Russian national championships bronze medalist.

== Sport career ==
Magomed has the 2020-2021 U20 junior Russian championships bronze medals. In 2022, he finished with the bronze medal at the All-Russian Spartakiad in Kazan, Tatarstan and at the Oleg Karavayev memorial. On February 7, 2023, he earned his first senior bronze medal at the Russian championships. On August 7, 2023, Murtazaliev won the gold medal at the CIS Games in Belarus. On October 28, 2023, he came first at the U23 World championships in Tirana, Albania. On February 28, 2024 he won the silver medal in the Greco-Roman 97 kg event at the European Championships. He competed at the 2024 European Wrestling Olympic Qualification Tournament in Baku, Azerbaijan hoping to qualify for the 2024 Summer Olympics in Paris, France. He was eliminated in his first match and he did not qualify for the Olympics. In May 2024, he won the U23 European Championships held in Baku, Azerbaijan. In October 2024, he finished at 3rd place of the U23 World Championships in Albania.

== Wrestling Achievements ==
- Senior level:
  - 2022 All-Russian Spartakiad — 3rd;
  - 2022 Oleg Karavayev memorial — 3rd;
  - 2023 Russian Championships — 3rd;
  - 2023 CIS Games — 1st;
  - 2023 U23 World Championships — 1st;
  - 2024 European Championships — 2nd;
  - 2024 U23 European Championships — 1st;
  - 2024 U23 World Championships — 3rd;
- Junior level
  - 2020-2021 Russian Championships — 3rd;
