= 2024 European Wrestling Championships – Men's Greco-Roman 97 kg =

Wrestling competition

Men's Greco-Roman 97 kg at the 2024 European Wrestling Championships
- Venue: Polyvalent Hall
- Location: Bucharest, Romania
- Dates: 13-14 February
- Competitors: 24

Medalists
gold medal	Artur Aleksanyan	Armenia
silver medal	Magomed Murtazaliev	Individual Neutral Athletes
bronze medal	Kiril Milov	Bulgaria
bronze medal	Abubakar Khaslakhanau	Individual Neutral Athletes

The Men's Greco-Roman 97 kg is a competition featured at the 2024 European Wrestling Championships, and was held in Bucharest, Romania on February 13 and 14.

== Results ==
Legend

- F — Won by fall

=== Final ===
Final
Magomed Murtazaliev (AIN)	3
Artur Aleksanyan (ARM)	6

=== Top half ===
Round of 32
Tamás Lévai (HUN)	0
Magomed Murtazaliev (AIN)	6
Tadeusz Michalik (POL)	5
Luca Svaicari (ITA)	1
Roman Balchivschii (MDA)	1
Vladlen Kozlyuk (UKR)	5
Robert Kobliashvili (GEO)	9
Patrik Gordan (ROU)	0

Round of 16
Artur Omarov (CZE)	0
Magomed Murtazaliev (AIN)	9
Tadeusz Michalik (POL)	0
Kiril Milov (BUL)	8
Mikheil Kajaia (SRB)	7
Vladlen Kozlyuk (UKR)	2
Robert Kobliashvili (GEO)	2
Arvi Savolainen (FIN)	3

Quarterfinals
Magomed Murtazaliev (AIN)	4
Kiril Milov (BUL)	0
Mikheil Kajaia (SRB)	0
Arvi Savolainen (FIN)	4

Semifinals
Magomed Murtazaliev (AIN)	6
Arvi Savolainen (FIN)	4

=== Bottom half ===
Round of 32
Beytullah Kayışdağ (TUR)	11^{F}
Richard Karelson (EST)	0
Tyrone Sterkenburg (NED)	5
Daniel Gastl (AUT)	4
Vilius Laurinaitis (LTU)	1
Anton Vieweg (GER)	5
Aleksandar Stjepanetic (SWE)	10
Filip Smetko (CRO)	8

Round of 16
Artur Aleksanyan (ARM)	9
Beytullah Kayışdağ (TUR)	1
Tyrone Sterkenburg (NED)	1
Murad Ahmadiyev (AZE)	1
Michail Iosifidis (GRE)	1
Anton Vieweg (GER)	5
Aleksandar Stjepanetic (SWE)	0
Abubakar Khaslakhanau (AIN)	9

Quarterfinals
Artur Aleksanyan (ARM)	8
Tyrone Sterkenburg (NED)	3
Anton Vieweg (GER)	0
Abubakar Khaslakhanau (AIN)	9

Semifinals
Artur Aleksanyan (ARM)	5
Abubakar Khaslakhanau (AIN)	1

=== Repechage ===
Repechage round 1
Tamás Lévai (HUN)	9
Artur Omarov (CZE)	1

Repechage round 2
Tamás Lévai (HUN)	0
Kiril Milov (BUL)	11
Beytullah Kayışdağ (TUR)	6
Tyrone Sterkenburg (NED)	1

Bronze medal match
Kiril Milov (BUL)	8^{F}
Arvi Savolainen (FIN)	0
Beytullah Kayışdağ (TUR)	0
Abubakar Khaslakhanau (AIN)	8

== Final standing ==
Rank	Athlete
1st place, gold medalist(s)	Artur Aleksanyan (ARM)
2nd place, silver medalist(s)	Magomed Murtazaliev (AIN)
3rd place, bronze medalist(s)	Kiril Milov (BUL)
3rd place, bronze medalist(s)	Abubakar Khaslakhanau (AIN)
5	Arvi Savolainen (FIN)
5	Beytullah Kayışdağ (TUR)
7	Tyrone Sterkenburg (NED)
8	Anton Vieweg (GER)
9	Robert Kobliashvili (GEO)
10	Tamás Lévai (HUN)
11	Vladlen Kozlyuk (UKR)
12	Aleksandar Stjepanetic (SWE)
13	Mikheil Kajaia (SRB)
14	Tadeusz Michalik (POL)
15	Filip Smetko (CRO)
16	Daniel Gastl (AUT)
17	Murad Ahmadiyev (AZE)
18	Luca Svaicari (ITA)
19	Roman Balchivschii (MDA)
20	Michail Iosifidis (GRE)
21	Vilius Laurinaitis (LTU)
22	Artur Omarov (CZE)
23	Patrik Gordan (ROU)
24	Richard Karelson (EST)
