= Hayk Khloyan =

Armenian wrestler (born 2001)

Personal information
- Native name: Հայկ Խլոյան
- Born: 18 September 2001 (age 24) Armenia
- Weight: 97 kg (214 lb)

Sport
- Country: Armenia
- Sport: Amateur wrestling
- Weight class: 97 kg
- Event: Greco-Roman
Medal record
Men's Greco-Roman wrestling
Representing Armenia
Grand Prix
Silver medal – second place	2025 Budapest	97 kg
U23 World Wrestling Championships
Gold medal – first place	2024 Tirana	97 kg
European U23 Championship
Bronze medal – third place	2023 Bucharest	97 kg

Hayk Khloyan (Armenian: Հայկ Խլոյան; born 18 September 2001) is an Armenian Greco-Roman wrestler who competes at 97 kilograms.

== Career ==
Khloyan began wrestling at a young age and quickly rose through the Armenian junior ranks. He represented Armenia at several international age-group competitions, developing into one of the nation's leading Greco-Roman athletes.

In 2023, Khloyan won the bronze medal in the 97 kg category at the U23 European Wrestling Championships in Bucharest, Romania. He secured his podium finish with strong performances against top European opponents.

The following year, Khloyan claimed his first world title by winning the gold medal at the 2024 U23 World Wrestling Championships in Tirana, Albania. In the final, he defeated Vladlen Kozliuk of Ukraine to become the U23 world champion in the 97 kg division.
