= 2024 U23 World Wrestling Championships – Men's Greco-Roman 97 kg =

Wrestling competitions

Men's Greco-Roman 97 kg at the 2024 U23 World Championships
- Venue: Tirana Olympic Park
- Dates: 21–22 October
- Competitors: 23 from 21 nations

Medalists
| gold medal | Hayk Khloyan | Armenia |
| silver medal | Abubakar Khaslakhanau | Authorised Neutral Athletes |
| bronze medal | Magomed Murtazaliev | Authorised Neutral Athletes |
| bronze medal | Shayan Habib Zare | Iran |

The men's Greco-Roman 97 kilograms is a competition featured at the 2024 U23 World Wrestling Championships, and will be held in Tirana, Albania on 21 and 22 October 2024.

This Greco-Roman wrestling competition consists of a single-elimination tournament, with a repechage used to determine the winner of two bronze medals. The two finalists face off for gold and silver medals. Each wrestler who loses to one of the two finalists moves into the repechage, culminating in a pair of bronze medal matches featuring the semifinal losers each facing the remaining repechage opponent from their half of the bracket.

== Results ==
Legend

- F — Won by fall

=== Final ===
| Final |
| Hayk Khloyan (ARM) | 11 |
| Abubakar Khaslakhanau (AIN) | 6 |

=== Top half ===
Round of 32
Yang Zichen (CHN) | 2
Igor Shepetun (POL) | 6^{F}
Hayk Khloyan (ARM) | 5
Anton Vieweg (GER) | 3
Luka Katić (SRB) | 5
Kristian Lukač (CRO) | 3

Round of 16
Riku Nakahara (JPN) | 0
Magomed Murtazaliev (AIN) | 10
Igor Shepetun (POL) | 1
Nitesh Siwach (IND) | 9
Beibit Korganov (KAZ) | 0
Hayk Khloyan (ARM) | 8
Luka Katić (SRB) | 2
Nurmanbet Raimaly Uulu (KGZ) | 6

Quarterfinals
Magomed Murtazaliev (AIN) | 9
Nitesh Siwach (IND) | 0
Hayk Khloyan (ARM) | 10
Nurmanbet Raimaly Uulu (KGZ) | 0

Semifinals
Magomed Murtazaliev (AIN) | 3
Hayk Khloyan (ARM) | 3

=== Bottom half ===
Round of 32
Juan Díaz (VEN) | 0
Mustafa Olgun (TUR) | 8
Christos Chatsatourov (GRE) | 6
Wyatt Voelker (USA) | 4
Yurii Dorohan (UKR) | 2
Murad Ahmadiyev (AZE) | 5
Lasha Tvildiani (GEO) | 3
Abubakar Khaslakhanau (AIN) | 11

Round of 16
Tyrone Sterkenburg (NED) | 2
Mustafa Olgun (TUR) | 2
Christos Chatsatourov (GRE) | 0
Richard Karelson (EST) | 9
Algot Källman (SWE) | 4
Murad Ahmadiyev (AZE) | 3
Abubakar Khaslakhanau (AIN) | 8
Shayan Habib Zare (IRI) | 0

Quarterfinals
Tyrone Sterkenburg (NED) | 0
Richard Karelson (EST) | 5
Algot Källman (SWE) | 0
Abubakar Khaslakhanau (AIN) | 4^{F}

Semifinals
Richard Karelson (EST) | 1
Abubakar Khaslakhanau (AIN) | 2

=== Repechage ===
Repechage round 1
Anton Vieweg (GER) | 9
Beibit Korganov (KAZ) | 0
Lasha Tvildiani (GEO) | 0
Shayan Habib Zare (IRI) | 3

Repechage round 2
Anton Vieweg (GER) | 10
Nurmanbet Raimaly Uulu (KGZ) | 1
Shayan Habib Zare (IRI) | 8
Algot Källman (SWE) | 0

Bronze medals
Anton Vieweg (GER) | 0
Magomed Murtazaliev (AIN) | 11
Shayan Habib Zare (IRI) | 8
Richard Karelson (EST) | 5

== Final standing ==
| Rank | Athlete |
|---|---|
| 1st place, gold medalist(s) | Hayk Khloyan (ARM) |
| 2nd place, silver medalist(s) | Abubakar Khaslakhanau (AIN) |
| 3rd place, bronze medalist(s) | Magomed Murtazaliev (AIN) |
| 3rd place, bronze medalist(s) | Shayan Habib Zare (IRI) |
| 5 | Anton Vieweg (GER) |
| 5 | Richard Karelson (EST) |
| 7 | Igor Shepetun (POL) |
| 8 | Mustafa Olgun (TUR) |
| 9 | Nitesh Siwach (IND) |
| 10 | Murad Ahmadiyev (AZE) |
| 11 | Luka Katić (SRB) |
| 12 | Nurmanbet Raimaly Uulu (KGZ) |
| 13 | Christos Chatsatourov (GRE) |
| 14 | Algot Källman (SWE) |
| 15 | Tyrone Sterkenburg (NED) |
| 16 | Wyatt Voelker (USA) |
| 17 | Kristian Lukač (CRO) |
| 18 | Lasha Tvildiani (GEO) |
| 19 | Yurii Dorohan (UKR) |
| 20 | Yang Zichen (CHN) |
| 21 | Juan Díaz (VEN) |
| 22 | Riku Nakahara (JPN) |
| 23 | Beibit Korganov (KAZ) |
