= 2024 European U23 Wrestling Championships =

2024 European U23 Championships
- Host city: Baku, Azerbaijan
- Dates: 20–26 May 2024
- Stadium: Baku Sports Palace

Champions
- Freestyle: Azerbaijan
- Greco-Roman: Azerbaijan
- Women: Ukraine

The 2024 European U23 Wrestling Championships is the 9th edition of the European U23 Wrestling Championships of combined events, and it will take place from 20 to 26 May in Baku, Azerbaijan. The championships, to welcome 365 athletes from 31 countries, held at the Baku Sports Palace.

== Competition schedule ==
All times are (UTC+4)

Date	Time	Event
20 May	10.30-13.30	Qualification rounds: GR – 55,63,77,87,130 kg
20 May	18:30-19.30	Semi-finals: GR – 55,63,77,87,130 kg
21 May	10.30-13.30	Qualification rounds: GR – 60,67,72,82,97 kg; Repechage: GR – 55,63,77,87,130 kg
21 May	16.45-17.45	Semi-finals: GR – 60,67,72,82,97 kg
21 May	18.00-20.30	Finals: GR – 55,63,77,87,130 kg
22 May	10.30-14.00	Qualification rounds: WW – 50,55,59,68,76 kg; Repechage: GR – 60,67,72,82,97 kg
22 May	16.45-17.45	Semi-finals: WW – 50,55,59,68,76 kg
22 May	18.00-20.30	Finals: GR – 60,67,72,82,97 kg
23 May	10.30-14.00	Qualification rounds: WW – 53,57,62,65,72 kg; Repechage: WW – 50,55,59,68,76 kg
23 May	16.45-17.45	Semi-finals: WW – 53,57,62,65,72 kg
23 May	18.00-20.30	Finals: WW – 50,55,59,68,76 kg
24 May	10.30-14.00	Qualification rounds: FS – 57,65,70,79,97 kg; Repechage: WW – 53,57,62,65,72 kg
24 May	16.45-17.45	Semi-finals: FS – 57,65,70,79,97 kg
24 May	18.00-20.30	Finals: WW – 53,57,62,65,72 kg
25 May	10.30-14.00	Qualification rounds: FS – 61,74,86,92,125 kg; Repechage: FS – 57,65,70,79,97 kg
25 May	16.45-17.45	Semi-finals: FS – 61,74,86,92,125 kg
25 May	18.00-20.30	Finals: FS – 57,65,70,79,97 kg
26 May	16.30-17.45	Repechage: FS – 61,74,86,92,125 kg
26 May	18.00-20.30	Finals: FS – 61,74,86,92,125 kg

== Medal table ==
* Host nation (Azerbaijan)

Rank	Nation	Gold	Silver	Bronze	Total
–	Individual Neutral Athletes	12	7	13	32
1	Azerbaijan*	5	4	7	16
2	Ukraine	4	4	3	11
3	Georgia	2	2	6	10
4	Moldova	2	1	6	9
5	Greece	2	0	0	2
6	Turkey	1	6	9	16
7	Bulgaria	1	0	1	2
8	Sweden	1	0	0	1
9	France	0	3	2	5
10	Hungary	0	1	4	5
11	Germany	0	1	2	3
12	Lithuania	0	1	0	1
13	Poland	0	0	2	2
13	Romania	0	0	2	2
15	Estonia	0	0	1	1
15	Israel	0	0	1	1
15	Norway	0	0	1	1
Totals (17 entries)		30	30	60	120

== Team ranking ==
Rank	Men's freestyle		Men's Greco-Roman		Women's freestyle	
Rank	Team	Points	Team	Points	Team	Points
1	Azerbaijan	137	Azerbaijan	163	Ukraine	168
2	Turkey	119	Georgia	138	Turkey	118
3	Moldova	96	Turkey	135	Azerbaijan	76
4	Georgia	94	Moldova	70	Moldova	50
5	Ukraine	85	Ukraine	66	Germany	50
6	Greece	76	Poland	51	Romania	48
7	France	68	Germany	46	Hungary	40
8	Bulgaria	56	Hungary	43	France	35
9	Poland	26	Bulgaria	26	Sweden	33
10	Italy	20	France	25	Poland	31

== Medal overview ==
=== Men's freestyle ===
Event	Gold	Silver	Bronze
57 kg	Artem Gobaev; Authorised Neutral Athletes	Muhammet Karavuş; Turkey	Vladyslav Abramov; Ukraine
57 kg	Artem Gobaev; Authorised Neutral Athletes	Muhammet Karavuş; Turkey	Luka Gvinjilia; Georgia
61 kg	Bashir Magomedov; Authorised Neutral Athletes	Mykyta Abramov; Ukraine	Emre Kural; Turkey
61 kg	Bashir Magomedov; Authorised Neutral Athletes	Mykyta Abramov; Ukraine	Nuraddin Novruzov; Azerbaijan
65 kg	Ibragim Ibragimov; Authorised Neutral Athletes	Khamzat Arsamerzouev; France	Abdullah Toprak; Turkey
65 kg	Ibragim Ibragimov; Authorised Neutral Athletes	Khamzat Arsamerzouev; France	Serghei Cilcic; Moldova
70 kg	Inalbek Sheriev; Authorised Neutral Athletes	Kanan Heybatov; Azerbaijan	Davit Patsinashvili; Georgia
70 kg	Inalbek Sheriev; Authorised Neutral Athletes	Kanan Heybatov; Azerbaijan	Chirilov Constantin; Moldova
74 kg	Dzhabrail Gadzhiev; Azerbaijan	Kamil Abdulvagabov; Authorised Neutral Athletes	Metehan Yaprak; Turkey
74 kg	Dzhabrail Gadzhiev; Azerbaijan	Kamil Abdulvagabov; Authorised Neutral Athletes	Luka Chkhitunidze; Georgia
79 kg	Georgios Kougioumtsidis; Greece	Ali Tcokaev; Azerbaijan	Arsen Balaian; Authorised Neutral Athletes
79 kg	Georgios Kougioumtsidis; Greece	Ali Tcokaev; Azerbaijan	Radomir Stoyanov; Bulgaria
86 kg	Arslan Bagaev; Authorised Neutral Athletes	Rakhim Magamadov; France	Arsenii Dzhioev; Azerbaijan
86 kg	Arslan Bagaev; Authorised Neutral Athletes	Rakhim Magamadov; France	Emre Çiftçi; Turkey
92 kg	Gkivi Bliatze; Greece	Adlan Viskhanov; France	Ion Demian; Moldova
92 kg	Gkivi Bliatze; Greece	Adlan Viskhanov; France	Mustafagadzhi Malachdibirov; Authorised Neutral Athletes
97 kg	Radu Lefter; Moldova	Soslan Dzhagaev; Authorised Neutral Athletes	Merab Suleimanishvili; Georgia
97 kg	Radu Lefter; Moldova	Soslan Dzhagaev; Authorised Neutral Athletes	Rıfat Gıdak; Turkey
125 kg	Alen Khubulov; Bulgaria	Solomon Manashvili; Georgia	Abdulla Kurbanov; Authorised Neutral Athletes
125 kg	Alen Khubulov; Bulgaria	Solomon Manashvili; Georgia	Milán Korcsog; Hungary

=== Men's Greco-Roman ===
Event	Gold	Silver	Bronze
55 kg	Giorgi Tokhadze; Georgia	Emre Mutlu; Turkey	Adam Ulbashev; Authorised Neutral Athletes
55 kg	Giorgi Tokhadze; Georgia	Emre Mutlu; Turkey	Rashad Mammadov; Azerbaijan
60 kg	Mert İlbars; Turkey	Nihad Guluzade; Azerbaijan	Melkamu Fetene; Israel
60 kg	Mert İlbars; Turkey	Nihad Guluzade; Azerbaijan	Dinislam Bammatov; Authorised Neutral Athletes
63 kg	Ziya Babashov; Azerbaijan	Vitalie Eriomenco; Moldova	Mairbek Salimov; Poland
63 kg	Ziya Babashov; Azerbaijan	Vitalie Eriomenco; Moldova	Bekir Ateş; Turkey
67 kg	Daniial Agaev; Authorised Neutral Athletes	Azat Sarıyar; Turkey	Oleg Khalilov; Ukraine
67 kg	Daniial Agaev; Authorised Neutral Athletes	Azat Sarıyar; Turkey	Diego Chkhikvadze; Georgia
72 kg	Giorgi Chkhikvadze; Georgia	Vilius Savickas; Lithuania	Ruslan Nurullayev; Azerbaijan
72 kg	Giorgi Chkhikvadze; Georgia	Vilius Savickas; Lithuania	Vasile Zabica; Moldova
77 kg	Khasay Hasanli; Azerbaijan	Yüksel Sarıçiçek; Turkey	Attila Tösmagi; Hungary
77 kg	Khasay Hasanli; Azerbaijan	Yüksel Sarıçiçek; Turkey	Alexandrin Guțu; Moldova
82 kg	Gurban Gurbanov; Azerbaijan	Islam Aliev; Authorised Neutral Athletes	Deni Nakaev; Germany
82 kg	Gurban Gurbanov; Azerbaijan	Islam Aliev; Authorised Neutral Athletes	Vladimeri Karchaidze; France
87 kg	Aues Gonibov; Authorised Neutral Athletes	Achiko Bolkvadze; Georgia	Lachin Valiyev; Azerbaijan
87 kg	Aues Gonibov; Authorised Neutral Athletes	Achiko Bolkvadze; Georgia	Exauce Mukubu; Norway
97 kg	Magomed Murtazaliev; Authorised Neutral Athletes	Abubakar Khaslakhanau; Authorised Neutral Athletes	Anton Vieweg; Germany
97 kg	Magomed Murtazaliev; Authorised Neutral Athletes	Abubakar Khaslakhanau; Authorised Neutral Athletes	Murad Ahmadiyev; Azerbaijan
130 kg	Mykhailo Vyshnyvetskyi; Ukraine	Koppány László; Hungary	Giorgi Tsopurashvili; Georgia
130 kg	Mykhailo Vyshnyvetskyi; Ukraine	Koppány László; Hungary	Hamza Bakır; Turkey

=== Women's freestyle ===
Event	Gold	Silver	Bronze
50 kg	Natallia Varakina; Authorised Neutral Athletes	Zehra Demirhan; Turkey	Ana Maria Pîrvu; Romania
50 kg	Natallia Varakina; Authorised Neutral Athletes	Zehra Demirhan; Turkey	Natalia Walczak; Poland
53 kg	Liliia Malanchuk; Ukraine	Elnura Mammadova; Azerbaijan	Venera Nafikova; Authorised Neutral Athletes
53 kg	Liliia Malanchuk; Ukraine	Elnura Mammadova; Azerbaijan	Viktoria Volk; Authorised Neutral Athletes
55 kg	Jonna Malmgren; Sweden	Mariia Vynnyk; Ukraine	Anastasiia Iandushkina; Authorised Neutral Athletes
55 kg	Jonna Malmgren; Sweden	Mariia Vynnyk; Ukraine	Mihaela Samoil; Moldova
57 kg	Zhala Aliyeva; Azerbaijan	Elvira Kamaloğlu; Turkey	Solomiia Vynnyk; Ukraine
57 kg	Zhala Aliyeva; Azerbaijan	Elvira Kamaloğlu; Turkey	Volha Hardzei; Authorised Neutral Athletes
59 kg	Alesia Hetmanava; Authorised Neutral Athletes	Anastasiia Sidelnikova; Authorised Neutral Athletes	Amel Rebiha; France
59 kg	Alesia Hetmanava; Authorised Neutral Athletes	Anastasiia Sidelnikova; Authorised Neutral Athletes	Ruzanna Mammadova; Azerbaijan
62 kg	Iryna Bondar; Ukraine	Yana Tretsiak; Authorised Neutral Athletes	Viktoria Vesso; Estonia
62 kg	Iryna Bondar; Ukraine	Yana Tretsiak; Authorised Neutral Athletes	Alina Kasabieva; Authorised Neutral Athletes
65 kg	Irina Rîngaci; Moldova	Ekaterina Koshkina; Authorised Neutral Athletes	Kateryna Zelenykh; Romania
65 kg	Irina Rîngaci; Moldova	Ekaterina Koshkina; Authorised Neutral Athletes	Nesrin Baş; Turkey
68 kg	Elizaveta Petliakova; Authorised Neutral Athletes	Manola Skobelska; Ukraine	Viktoryia Radzkova; Authorised Neutral Athletes
68 kg	Elizaveta Petliakova; Authorised Neutral Athletes	Manola Skobelska; Ukraine	Karolina Pók; Hungary
72 kg	Alina Shauchuk; Authorised Neutral Athletes	Nadiia Sokolovska; Ukraine	Olesia Bezuglova; Authorised Neutral Athletes
72 kg	Alina Shauchuk; Authorised Neutral Athletes	Nadiia Sokolovska; Ukraine	Bükrenaz Sert; Turkey
76 kg	Mariia Orlevych; Ukraine	Laura Kuehn; Germany	Olga Kozyreva; Authorised Neutral Athletes
76 kg	Mariia Orlevych; Ukraine	Laura Kuehn; Germany	Zsófi Virág; Hungary

== Participating nations ==
365 wrestlers from 31 countries:

1. Austria (3)
2. Azerbaijan (27) (Host)
3. Belgium (2)
4. Bulgaria (21)
5. Croatia (5)
6. Czech Republic (4)
7. Spain (3)
8. Estonia (5)
9. Finland (4)
10. France (11)
11. United Kingdom (1)
12. Georgia (20)
13. Germany (16)
14. Greece (12)
15. Hungary (11)
16. Israel (3)
17. Italy (12)
18. Kosovo (1)
19. Lithuania (6)
20. Moldova (22)
21. Netherlands (1)
22. Norway (4)
23. Poland (21)
24. Portugal (2)
25. Romania (12)
26. Serbia (6)
27. Switzerland (4)
28. Slovakia (3)
29. Sweden (5)
30. Turkey (30)
31. Ukraine (30)
32. Individual Neutral Athletes (58)

== Results ==
Legend

- C — Won by 3 cautions given to the opponent
- F — Won by fall
- R — Retired
- WO — Won by walkover

=== Men's freestyle ===
==== Men's freestyle 57 kg ====
Main bracket

Round of 16
Vladyslav Abramov (UKR)	10
Rocco Terranova (ITA)	0
Andreas Parotsidis (GRE)	2
Elman Aghayev (AZE)	13
Ion Bulgaru (MDA)	0
Thomas Epp (SUI)	6

Quarterfinals
Ivaylo Tisov (BUL)
Vladyslav Abramov (UKR)	WO
Herbert Akapian (ANA)	5
Muhammet Karavuş (TUR)	15
Luka Gvinjilia (GEO)	12
Elman Aghayev (AZE)	2
Thomas Epp (SUI)	0
Artem Gobaev (ANA)	10

Semifinals
Vladyslav Abramov (UKR)	0
Muhammet Karavuş (TUR)	10^{F}
Luka Gvinjilia (GEO)	1
Artem Gobaev (ANA)	12

Final
Muhammet Karavuş (TUR)	3
Artem Gobaev (ANA)	8

Bronze medal match
Herbert Akapian (ANA)	3
Vladyslav Abramov (UKR)	8
Thomas Epp (SUI)	1
Luka Gvinjilia (GEO)	4

==== Men's freestyle 61 kg ====
Main bracket

Round of 16
Simone Piroddu (ITA)	7
Stilyan Iliev (BUL)	1^{R}
Yahor Rudauski (ANA)	7
Vasile Marcu (MDA)	1

Quarterfinals
Daviti Abdaladze (GEO)	10
Simone Piroddu (ITA)	12
Bashir Magomedov (ANA)	10
Emre Kural (TUR)	2
Dario Dittrich (GER)	0
Nuraddin Novruzov (AZE)	10
Yahor Rudauski (ANA)	3
Mykyta Abramov (UKR)	6

Semifinals
Simone Piroddu (ITA)	0
Bashir Magomedov (ANA)	10
Nuraddin Novruzov (AZE)	12
Mykyta Abramov (UKR)	15

Final
Bashir Magomedov (ANA)	10
Mykyta Abramov (UKR)	0

Bronze medal match
Emre Kural (TUR)	4
Simone Piroddu (ITA)	3
Yahor Rudauski (ANA)	12
Nuraddin Novruzov (AZE)	13

==== Men's freestyle 65 kg ====
Main bracket

Round of 16
Ayub Musaev (BEL)	7
Marian Sandu (ROU)	2
Musa Aghayev (AZE)	11
Yurii Vovk (UKR)	4
Abdullah Toprak (TUR)	12
Giorgi Shonia (GEO)	1
Erdal Galip (BUL)	3
Serghei Cîlcic (MDA)	14
Jakob Saurwein (AUT)	0
Daniel Kulczyński (POL)	11

Quarterfinals
Khamzat Arsamerzouev (FRA)	4
Ayub Musaev (BEL)	2
Musa Aghayev (AZE)	2
Abdullah Toprak (TUR)	4
Anatoli Hramyka (ANA)	11
Serghei Cîlcic (MDA)	12
Daniel Kulczyński (POL)	1
Ibragim Ibragimov (ANA)	13

Semifinals
Khamzat Arsamerzouev (FRA)	9
Abdullah Toprak (TUR)	6
Serghei Cîlcic (MDA)	0
Ibragim Ibragimov (ANA)	11

Final
Khamzat Arsamerzouev (FRA)	2
Ibragim Ibragimov (ANA)	6

Bronze medal match
Ayub Musaev (BEL)	2
Abdullah Toprak (TUR)	3
Daniel Kulczyński (POL)	0
Serghei Cîlcic (MDA)	4

==== Men's freestyle 70 kg ====
Main bracket

Round of 16
Seyfulla Itaev (FRA)	5
Kanan Heybatov (AZE)	10
Mateusz Łuszczyński (POL)	0
Inalbek Sheriev (ANA)	10

Quarterfinals
Davit Patsinashvili (GEO)	2
Kanan Heybatov (AZE)	6
Benedikt Huber (AUT)	2
Mikita Dzemchanka (ANA)	5
Bohdan Oliinyk (UKR)	9
Yasin Yeşil (TUR)	0
Inalbek Sheriev (ANA)	12
Constantin Chirilov (MDA)	2

Semifinals
Kanan Heybatov (AZE)	11
Mikita Dzemchanka (ANA)	0
Bohdan Oliinyk (UKR)	0
Inalbek Sheriev (ANA)	11

Final
Kanan Heybatov (AZE)	2
Inalbek Sheriev (ANA)	6

Repechage round
Seyfulla Itaev (FRA)	2
Davit Patsinashvili (GEO)	5
Mateusz Łuszczyński (POL)	0
Constantin Chirilov (MDA)	4^{F}

Bronze medal match
Davit Patsinashvili (GEO)	5
Mikita Dzemchanka (ANA)	0
Constantin Chirilov (MDA)	3
Bohdan Oliinyk (UKR)	1

==== Men's freestyle 74 kg ====
Main bracket

Round of 16
Metehan Yaprak (TUR)	4
Kamil Abdulvagabov (ANA)	5
Raul Caso (ITA)	0
Krisztian Biro (ROU)	9
Mykyta Morhun (UKR)	5
Muhammad Abdurachmanov (BEL)	5
Ion Marcu (MDA)	0
Stas David Wolf (GER)	5
Luka Chkhitunidze (GEO)	11
Egzon Xhoni (KOS)	0
Ivan Stoyanov (BUL)	1
Dzhabrail Gadzhiev (AZE)	11
Fabian Niedźwiedzki (POL)	0
Theocharis Kougioumtsidis (GRE)	11

Quarterfinals
Muslim Makhmudov (ANA)	0
Kamil Abdulvagabov (ANA)	10
Krisztian Biro (ROU)	10
Muhammad Abdurachmanov (BEL)	0
Stas David Wolf (GER)	2
Luka Chkhitunidze (GEO)	5
Dzhabrail Gadzhiev (AZE)	10^{F}
Theocharis Kougioumtsidis (GRE)	1

Semifinals
Kamil Abdulvagabov (ANA)	7
Krisztian Biro (ROU)	3
Luka Chkhitunidze (GEO)	4
Dzhabrail Gadzhiev (AZE)	7

Final
Kamil Abdulvagabov (ANA)	5
Dzhabrail Gadzhiev (AZE)	6

Repechage round
Metehan Yaprak (TUR)	13
Muslim Makhmudov (ANA)	0
Ivan Stoyanov (BUL)	5
Theocharis Kougioumtsidis (GRE)	14

Bronze medal match
Metehan Yaprak (TUR)	6
Krisztian Biro (ROU)	4
Theocharis Kougioumtsidis (GRE)	2
Luka Chkhitunidze (GEO)	7

==== Men's freestyle 79 kg ====
Main bracket

Round of 16
Raffaele Matrullo (ITA)	0
Georgios Kougioumtsidis (GRE)	13
Mateusz Pędzicki (POL)	6
Lukas Lins (AUT)	5
Artsiom Belavusau (ANA)	7
Bohdan Oleksiienko (UKR)	5
Otari Adeishvili (GEO)	0
Arsen Balaian (ANA)	10
Andrija Ivanović (SRB)	3
Joona Vuoti (FIN)	6
Ali Tcokaev (AZE)	11
Radomir Stoyanov (BUL)	0
Umar Mavlaev (SUI)	6
Okan Tahtacı (TUR)	4
Michal Vereš (SVK)	0
Marius Retco (MDA)	8^{F}

Quarterfinals
Georgios Kougioumtsidis (GRE)	10
Mateusz Pędzicki (POL)	0
Artsiom Belavusau (ANA)	0
Arsen Balaian (ANA)	9
Joona Vuoti (FIN)	0
Ali Tcokaev (AZE)	10
Umar Mavlaev (SUI)	5
Marius Retco (MDA)	6

Semifinals
Georgios Kougioumtsidis (GRE)	3
Arsen Balaian (ANA)	1
Ali Tcokaev (AZE)	10
Marius Retco (MDA)	0

Final
Georgios Kougioumtsidis (GRE)	4
Ali Tcokaev (AZE)	1

Repechage round
Raffaele Matrullo (ITA)	11
Mateusz Pędzicki (POL)	7
Radomir Stoyanov (BUL)	10
Joona Vuoti (FIN)	0

Bronze medal match
Raffaele Matrullo (ITA)	0
Arsen Balaian (ANA)	2^{F}
Radomir Stoyanov (BUL)	6
Marius Retco (MDA)	4

==== Men's freestyle 86 kg ====
Main bracket

Round of 16
Yehor Horokh (UKR)	6
Miko Elkala (FIN)	10
Patrik Mezei (HUN)	0
Joshua Morodion (GER)	10
Arsenii Dzhioev (AZE)	WO
Damian Korbus (POL)
Traian Căpățînă (MDA)	0
Rakhim Magamadov (FRA)	10
Emre Çiftçi (TUR)	6
Tamaz Nikoleishvili (GEO)	1

Quarterfinals
Arslan Bagaev (ANA)	10
Miko Elkala (FIN)	0
Joshua Morodion (GER)	2
Arsenii Dzhioev (AZE)	7
Ilya Khamtsou (ANA)	0
Rakhim Magamadov (FRA)	10
Emre Çiftçi (TUR)	8
Gabriel Iglesias (ESP)	2

Semifinals
Arslan Bagaev (ANA)	5
Arsenii Dzhioev (AZE)	1
Rakhim Magamadov (FRA)	11
Emre Çiftçi (TUR)	0

Final
Arslan Bagaev (ANA)	10
Rakhim Magamadov (FRA)	0

Repechage round
Traian Căpățînă (MDA)	4
Ilya Khamtsou (ANA)	4

Bronze medal match
Miko Elkala (FIN)	0
Arsenii Dzhioev (AZE)	11
Ilya Khamtsou (ANA)	4
Emre Çiftçi (TUR)	6

==== Men's freestyle 92 kg ====
Main bracket

Round of 16
Kacper Śledź (POL)	0
Denys Sahaliuk (UKR)	10
Krisztián Angyal (HUN)	1
Anar Jafarli (AZE)	8
Sali Saliev (BUL)	1
Ion Demian (MDA)	7
Aliaksei Parkhomenka (ANA)	5
Mustafagadzhi Malachdibirov (ANA)	11
Adlan Viskhanov (FRA)	9
Muhammed Gimri (TUR)	3

Quarterfinals
Gkivi Bliatze (GRE)	4
Denys Sahaliuk (UKR)	1
Anar Jafarli (AZE)	3
Ion Demian (MDA)	4
Andro Margishvili (GEO)	5
Mustafagadzhi Malachdibirov (ANA)	5
Adlan Viskhanov (FRA)	10
Sultan Kopbayev (ESP)	0

Semifinals
Gkivi Bliatze (GRE)	4
Ion Demian (MDA)	2
Mustafagadzhi Malachdibirov (ANA)	4
Adlan Viskhanov (FRA)	10

Final
Gkivi Bliatze (GRE)	8
Adlan Viskhanov (FRA)	7

Repechage round
Muhammed Gimri (TUR)	10
Sultan Kopbayev (ESP)	0

Bronze medal match
Denys Sahaliuk (UKR)	6
Ion Demian (MDA)	16
Muhammed Gimri (TUR)	2
Mustafagadzhi Malachdibirov (ANA)	6

==== Men's freestyle 97 kg ====
Main bracket

Round of 16
Vasyl Sova (UKR)	5
Uladzislau Kazlou (ANA)	3
Ravan Musayev (AZE)	2
Soslan Dzhagaev (ANA)	11
Johannes Mayer (GER)	0
Wiktor Hasa (POL)	6

Quarterfinals
Merab Suleimanishvili (GEO)	12
Vasyl Sova (UKR)	6
Radu Lefter (MDA)	11
Angelos Kouklaris (GRE)	0
Florin Tripon (ROU)	0
Soslan Dzhagaev (ANA)	6
Wiktor Hasa (POL)	0
Rıfat Gıdak (TUR)	5

Semifinals
Merab Suleimanishvili (GEO)	4
Radu Lefter (MDA)	14
Soslan Dzhagaev (ANA)	3
Rıfat Gıdak (TUR)	1

Final
Radu Lefter (MDA)	6
Soslan Dzhagaev (ANA)	1

Repechage round 1
Ravan Musayev (AZE)	4
Florin Tripon (ROU)	3

Bronze medal match
Angelos Kouklaris (GRE)	8
Merab Suleimanishvili (GEO)	10
Ravan Musayev (AZE)	2
Rıfat Gıdak (TUR)	3

==== Men's freestyle 125 kg ====
Main bracket

Round of 16
Alen Khubulov (BUL)	10
Grigore Albu (MDA)	0

Quarterfinals
Adil Mısırcı (TUR)	0
Alen Khubulov (BUL)	10
Pavel Dziatlau (ANA)	0
Abdulla Kurbanov (ANA)	11
Solomon Manashvili (GEO)	10^{F}
Volodymyr Kochanov (UKR)	1
Milán Korcsog (HUN)	4
Yusif Dursunov (AZE)	1

Semifinals
Alen Khubulov (BUL)	3
Abdulla Kurbanov (ANA)	2
Solomon Manashvili (GEO)	4
Milán Korcsog (HUN)	1

Final
Alen Khubulov (BUL)	6
Solomon Manashvili (GEO)	5

Repechage round 1
Grigore Albu (MDA)	0
Adil Mısırcı (TUR)	10

Bronze medal match
Adil Mısırcı (TUR)	8
Abdulla Kurbanov (ANA)	12
Volodymyr Kochanov (UKR)	1
Milán Korcsog (HUN)	8

=== Men's Greco-Roman ===
==== Men's Greco-Roman 55 kg ====
Main bracket

Quarterfinals		Semifinals		Final
Adam Ulbashev (ANA)	3
Denis Mihai (ROU)	2	Adam Ulbashev (ANA)	5
Emre Mutlu (TUR)	8	Emre Mutlu (TUR)	6
Leonid Moroz (MDA)	3			Emre Mutlu (TUR)	0
Maksim Stupakevich (ANA)	0			Giorgi Tokhadze (GEO)	9
Rashad Mammadov (AZE)	9	Rashad Mammadov (AZE)	0
Giorgi Tokhadze (GEO)	13	Giorgi Tokhadze (GEO)	8
Ivan Stefansky (UKR)	4

Bronze medal match
Leonid Moroz (MDA)	1
Adam Ulbashev (ANA)	7
Ivan Stefansky (UKR)	0
Rashad Mammadov (AZE)	7

==== Men's Greco-Roman 60 kg ====
Main bracket

Round of 16
Melkamu Fetene (ISR)	0
Mert İlbars (TUR)	8^{F}
Romeo Beridze (GEO)	9
Dinislam Bammatov (ANA)	18^{C}
Olivier Skrzypczak (POL)	0
Nihad Guluzade (AZE)	9

Quarterfinals
Yevhen Pokovba (UKR)	0
Mert İlbars (TUR)	9
Georgios Scarpello (GER)	8
Ilias Zairakis (GRE)	0
Adrian Anton (ROU)
Dinislam Bammatov (ANA)	WO
Nihad Guluzade (AZE)	8
Dzianis Vitaroi (ANA)	0

Semifinals
Mert İlbars (TUR)	3
Georgios Scarpello (GER)	1
Dinislam Bammatov (ANA)	4
Nihad Guluzade (AZE)	9

Final
Mert İlbars (TUR)	2
Nihad Guluzade (AZE)	1

Repechage round
Melkamu Fetene (ISR)	9
Yevhen Pokovba (UKR)	0
Olivier Skrzypczak (POL)	8
Dzianis Vitaroi (ANA)	0

Bronze medal match
Melkamu Fetene (ISR)	4
Georgios Scarpello (GER)	3
Olivier Skrzypczak (POL)	3
Dinislam Bammatov (ANA)	6

==== Men's Greco-Roman 63 kg ====
Main bracket

Round of 16
Ziya Babashov (AZE)	4
Mairbek Salimov (POL)	1
Janis Heinzelbecker (GER)	0
Anri Khozrevanidze (GEO)	8
Hristo Valentinov (BUL)	0
Vitalie Eriomenco (MDA)	8
Aleksandr Andreev (ANA)	10
Miguel Santos (POR)	0

Quarterfinals
Talibsho Khaibarau (ANA)	0
Ziya Babashov (AZE)	8
Anri Khozrevanidze (GEO)	0
Abere Fetene (ISR)	2
Bekir Ateş (TUR)	0
Vitalie Eriomenco (MDA)	8^{F}
Aleksandr Andreev (ANA)	5
Vasyl Myshanych (UKR)	5

Semifinals
Ziya Babashov (AZE)	5
Abere Fetene (ISR)	3
Vitalie Eriomenco (MDA)	2^{F}
Aleksandr Andreev (ANA)	2

Final
Ziya Babashov (AZE)	3
Vitalie Eriomenco (MDA)	2

Repechage round
Mairbek Salimov (POL)	10
Talibsho Khaibarau (ANA)	0
Hristo Valentinov (BUL)	4
Bekir Ateş (TUR)	7

Bronze medal match
Mairbek Salimov (POL)	6
Abere Fetene (ISR)	2
Bekir Ateş (TUR)	6
Aleksandr Andreev (ANA)	5

==== Men's Greco-Roman 67 kg ====
Main bracket

Round of 16
Andrea Setti (ITA)	3
Viachaslau Zhehalau (ANA)	9
Bredi Slinkers (NED)	1
Arslanbek Salimov (POL)	10
Azat Sarıyar (TUR)	9
Dimitar Georgiev (BUL)	5
Adomas Grigaliūnas (LTU)	1
Faraim Mustafayev (AZE)	9
Oleg Khalilov (UKR)	6
Marco Stoll (GER)	4
Daniial Agaev (ANA)	14
Nestori Mannila (FIN)	7
Yanis Nifri (FRA)	10
Shon Nadorgin (ISR)	3

Quarterfinals
Diego Chkhikvadze (GEO)	10
Viachaslau Zhehalau (ANA)	1
Arslanbek Salimov (POL)	6
Azat Sarıyar (TUR)	7
Faraim Mustafayev (AZE)	1
Oleg Khalilov (UKR)	9
Daniial Agaev (ANA)	2
Yanis Nifri (FRA)	1

Semifinals
Diego Chkhikvadze (GEO)	3
Azat Sarıyar (TUR)	3
Oleg Khalilov (UKR)	5
Daniial Agaev (ANA)	7

Final
Azat Sarıyar (TUR)	1
Daniial Agaev (ANA)	11

Repechage round
Dimitar Georgiev (BUL)	8^{F}
Arslanbek Salimov (POL)	3
Nestori Mannila (FIN)	5
Yanis Nifri (FRA)	8

Bronze medal match
Dimitar Georgiev (BUL)	1
Diego Chkhikvadze (GEO)	9
Yanis Nifri (FRA)	2
Oleg Khalilov (UKR)	2

==== Men's Greco-Roman 72 kg ====
Final

Final
Giorgi Chkhikvadze (GEO)	8
Vilius Savickas (LTU)	0

Top half

Round of 32
Furkan Zırın (TUR)	1
Giorgi Chkhikvadze (GEO)	9

Round of 16
Petar Gornyashki (BUL)	4
Georgios Barbanos (SWE)	2
Giorgi Chkhikvadze (GEO)	5
Krisztofer Klányi (HUN)	1
Ruslan Nurullayev (AZE)	2
Michael Portmann (SUI)	1
Dmitrii Adamov (ANA)	6
Aaron Bellscheidt (GER)	3

Quarterfinals
Petar Gornyashki (BUL)	0
Giorgi Chkhikvadze (GEO)	10^{F}
Ruslan Nurullayev (AZE)	6
Dmitrii Adamov (ANA)	3

Semifinals
Giorgi Chkhikvadze (GEO)	5
Ruslan Nurullayev (AZE)	4

Bottom half

Round of 32

Round of 16
Mikita Murashka (ANA)	9
Piotr Lewandowski (POL)	0
Vladyslav Yevtushenko (UKR)	0
Giovanni Alessio (ITA)	9
Luka Malobabić (CRO)	2
Vasile Zabica (MDA)	11
Naïm Bolaky-Meïte (FRA)	1
Vilius Savickas (LTU)	3

Quarterfinals
Mikita Murashka (ANA)	0
Giovanni Alessio (ITA)	10
Vasile Zabica (MDA)	1
Vilius Savickas (LTU)	4

Semifinals
Giovanni Alessio (ITA)	1
Vilius Savickas (LTU)	2

Repechage round 1
Furkan Zırın (TUR)	4
Krisztofer Klányi (HUN)	1

Repechage round 2
Furkan Zırın (TUR)	1
Petar Gornyashki (BUL)	11
~~Naïm Bolaky-Meïte (FRA)~~
Vasile Zabica (MDA)	WO

Bronze medal match
Petar Gornyashki (BUL)	4
Ruslan Nurullayev (AZE)	7
Vasile Zabica (MDA)	5
Giovanni Alessio (ITA)	4

==== Men's Greco-Roman 77 kg ====
Final

Final
Yüksel Sarıçiçek (TUR)	1
Khasay Hasanli (AZE)	10

Top half

Round of 32
Samuel Bellscheidt (GER)	5
Ekke Leitham (EST)	1

Round of 16
Júnior Benítez (ESP)	1
Michal Zelenka (CZE)	5
Samuel Bellscheidt (GER)	1
Attila Tösmagi (HUN)	2
Andreas Vasilakopoulos (GRE)	2
David Loher (SUI)	1
Temuri Orjonikidze (GEO)	1
Yüksel Sarıçiçek (TUR)	4

Quarterfinals
Michal Zelenka (CZE)	0
Attila Tösmagi (HUN)	2^{F}
Andreas Vasilakopoulos (GRE)	0
Yüksel Sarıçiçek (TUR)	11

Semifinals
Attila Tösmagi (HUN)	2
Yüksel Sarıçiçek (TUR)	5

Bottom half

Round of 32
Alexandrin Guțu (MDA)	9^{F}
Kamil Czarnecki (POL)	0

Round of 16
Islam Barakhoev (ANA)	2
Khasay Hasanli (AZE)	6
Aleksa Ilić (SRB)	3
Irfan Mirzoiev (UKR)	4
João Simões (POR)	0
Alexandrin Guțu (MDA)	8
Dimitar Rachev (BUL)	1^{R}
Adam Strandner (SWE)	5

Quarterfinals
Khasay Hasanli (AZE)	10
Irfan Mirzoiev (UKR)	2
Alexandrin Guțu (MDA)	13
Adam Strandner (SWE)	0

Semifinals
Khasay Hasanli (AZE)	7^{C}
Alexandrin Guțu (MDA)	0

Repechage round 2
Temuri Orjonikidze (GEO)	8
Andreas Vasilakopoulos (GRE)	0
Islam Barakhoev (ANA)	7^{F}
Irfan Mirzoiev (UKR)	3

Bronze medal match
Temuri Orjonikidze (GEO)	1
Attila Tösmagi (HUN)	5
Islam Barakhoev (ANA)	2
Alexandrin Guțu (MDA)	3

==== Men's Greco-Roman 82 kg ====
Final

Final
Gurban Gurbanov (AZE)	8
Islam Aliev (ANA)	2

Top half

Round of 32
Leon Rivalta (ITA)	3
Vasile Cojoc (ROU)	1

Round of 16
Péter Dömök (HUN)	3
Martin Shishekov (BUL)	0
Leon Rivalta (ITA)	6^{F}
Alperen Berber (TUR)	4
Arsenas Stankevičius (LTU)	0
Vladimeri Karchaidze (FRA)	9^{F}
Gurban Gurbanov (AZE)	8
Evangelos Boukis (GRE)	0

Quarterfinals
Péter Dömök (HUN)	1
Leon Rivalta (ITA)	1
Vladimeri Karchaidze (FRA)	0
Gurban Gurbanov (AZE)	5

Semifinals
Leon Rivalta (ITA)	0
Gurban Gurbanov (AZE)	8

Bottom half

Round of 32

Round of 16
Alexander Johansson (SWE)	3
Alexandru Solovei (MDA)	7
Adam Gardzioła (POL)	0
Islam Aliev (ANA)	6^{F}
Data Chkhaidze (GEO)	1
Ivan Chmyr (UKR)	1
Deni Nakaev (GER)	10
Ivo Švígler (CZE)	0

Quarterfinals
Alexandru Solovei (MDA)	0
Islam Aliev (ANA)	8
Data Chkhaidze (GEO)	4
Deni Nakaev (GER)	10

Semifinals
Islam Aliev (ANA)	8
Deni Nakaev (GER)	2

Repechage round 2
Evangelos Boukis (GRE)	1
Vladimeri Karchaidze (FRA)	7
Adam Gardzioła (POL)	3
Alexandru Solovei (MDA)	3

Bronze medal match
Vladimeri Karchaidze (FRA)	11^{F}
Leon Rivalta (ITA)	4
Alexandru Solovei (MDA)	1
Deni Nakaev (GER)	4

==== Men's Greco-Roman 87 kg ====
Main bracket

Round of 16
Achiko Bolkvadze (GEO)	9
Lachin Valiyev (AZE)	0
Ivaylo Ivanov (BUL)	3
Islam Aliev (POL)	6
Mykyta Alieksieiev (UKR)	4
Ilya Mialeshchyk (ANA)	7
Nikolaos Iosifidis (GRE)	0
Aues Gonibov (ANA)	9
Samet Yaldıran (TUR)	4
Tomislav Brkan (CRO)	1

Quarterfinals
Patrik Gordan (ROU)	2
Achiko Bolkvadze (GEO)	9
Islam Aliev (POL)	4
Ilya Mialeshchyk (ANA)	6
Exauce Mukubu (NOR)	0
Aues Gonibov (ANA)	3
Samet Yaldıran (TUR)	7
Gabriel Lupașco (MDA)	3

Semifinals
Achiko Bolkvadze (GEO)	8
Ilya Mialeshchyk (ANA)	4
Aues Gonibov (ANA)	2
Samet Yaldıran (TUR)	0

Final
Achiko Bolkvadze (GEO)	0
Aues Gonibov (ANA)	7

Repechage round
Lachin Valiyev (AZE)	4
Patrik Gordan (ROU)	3
Nikolaos Iosifidis (GRE)	0
Exauce Mukubu (NOR)	8

Bronze medal match
Lachin Valiyev (AZE)	4
Ilya Mialeshchyk (ANA)	1
Exauce Mukubu (NOR)	10
Samet Yaldıran (TUR)	0

==== Men's Greco-Roman 97 kg ====
Main bracket

Round of 16
Magomed Murtazaliev (ANA)	9
Roman Balchivschii (MDA)	0
Anton Vieweg (GER)	13
Luka Gabisonia (GEO)	8
Vladyslav Lub (UKR)	1
Kristian Lukač (CRO)	3
Abubakar Khaslakhanau (ANA)	7
Murad Ahmadiyev (AZE)	1
Richard Karelson (EST)	5
Kaloyan Ivanov (BUL)	1
Igor Shepetun (POL)	1
Aapo Viitala (FIN)	4^{F}

Quarterfinals
Luka Katić (SRB)	0
Magomed Murtazaliev (ANA)	9
Anton Vieweg (GER)	1
Kristian Lukač (CRO)	1
Abubakar Khaslakhanau (ANA)	5^{F}
Richard Karelson (EST)	1
Aapo Viitala (FIN)	8
Mustafa Olgun (TUR)	6

Semifinals
Magomed Murtazaliev (ANA)	10^{F}
Anton Vieweg (GER)	3
Abubakar Khaslakhanau (ANA)	6^{F}
Aapo Viitala (FIN)	2

Final
Magomed Murtazaliev (ANA)	4
Abubakar Khaslakhanau (ANA)	1

Repechage round
Roman Balchivschii (MDA)	1
Luka Katić (SRB)	1
Murad Ahmadiyev (AZE)	1
Richard Karelson (EST)	1

Bronze medal match
Luka Katić (SRB)	1
Anton Vieweg (GER)	3
Murad Ahmadiyev (AZE)	11
Aapo Viitala (FIN)	0

==== Men's Greco-Roman 130 kg ====
Main bracket

Round of 16
Dmitrii Baboryko (ANA)	3
Nikolaos Ntounias (GRE)	1
Marcel Albini (CZE)	1
Mykhailo Vyshnyvetskyi (UKR)	2
Pavel Hlinchuk (ANA)	2
Hamza Bakır (TUR)	4

Quarterfinals
Sarkhan Mammadov (AZE)	0
Dmitrii Baboryko (ANA)	3
Koppány László (HUN)	4
Giorgi Tsopurashvili (GEO)	1
Dominik Krawczyk (POL)	1
Mykhailo Vyshnyvetskyi (UKR)	12^{F}
Hamza Bakır (TUR)	6
Eerik Pank (EST)	0

Semifinals
Dmitrii Baboryko (ANA)	1
Koppány László (HUN)	1
Mykhailo Vyshnyvetskyi (UKR)	9
Hamza Bakır (TUR)	1

Final
Koppány László (HUN)	0
Mykhailo Vyshnyvetskyi (UKR)	4^{F}

Repechage round
Marcel Albini (CZE)	6
Dominik Krawczyk (POL)	5

Bronze medal match
Giorgi Tsopurashvili (GEO)	9
Dmitrii Baboryko (ANA)	1
Marcel Albini (CZE)	1
Hamza Bakır (TUR)	4

=== Women's freestyle ===
==== Women's freestyle 50 kg ====
Main bracket

Round of 16
Natallia Varakina (ANA)	5
Khrystyna Basych (SVK)	4
Polina Lukina (ANA)	0
Ana Maria Pîrvu (ROU)	4^{F}
Aida Kerymova (UKR)	10
Maria Leorda (MDA)	0
Joséphine Haemmerle (FRA)	0
Zehra Demirhan (TUR)	2^{F}

Quarterfinals
Shahana Nazarova (AZE)	0
Natallia Varakina (ANA)	10
Ana Maria Pîrvu (ROU)	7
Emine Osman (BUL)	0
Gabija Dilytė (LTU)	7
Aida Kerymova (UKR)	3
Zehra Demirhan (TUR)	6^{F}
Natalia Walczak (POL)	0

Semifinals
Natallia Varakina (ANA)	10
Ana Maria Pîrvu (ROU)	0
Gabija Dilytė (LTU)	4
Zehra Demirhan (TUR)	6

Final
Natallia Varakina (ANA)	8
Zehra Demirhan (TUR)	8

Repechage round
Khrystyna Basych (SVK)	10
Shahana Nazarova (AZE)	0
Joséphine Haemmerle (FRA)	4
Natalia Walczak (POL)	15

Bronze medal match
Khrystyna Basych (SVK)	2
Ana Maria Pîrvu (ROU)	6
Natalia Walczak (POL)	5
Gabija Dilytė (LTU)	2

==== Women's freestyle 53 kg ====
Main bracket

Quarterfinals		Semifinals		Final
Maria Ferone (ITA)	2
Şevval Çayır (TUR)	5	Şevval Çayır (TUR)	0
Venera Nafikova (ANA)	0	Liliia Malanchuk (UKR)	11
Liliia Malanchuk (UKR)	8^{F}			Liliia Malanchuk (UKR)	13
Irena Binkova (BUL)	3			Elnura Mammadova (AZE)	2
Laura Stanelytė (LTU)	11^{F}	Laura Stanelytė (LTU)	0
Viktoria Volk (ANA)	1	Elnura Mammadova (AZE)	7
Elnura Mammadova (AZE)	6

Bronze medal match
Venera Nafikova (ANA)	5^{F}
Şevval Çayır (TUR)	1
Viktoria Volk (ANA)	12
Laura Stanelytė (LTU)	1

==== Women's freestyle 55 kg ====
Main bracket

Round of 16
Aliaksandra Bulava (ANA)	9
Josefine Purschke (GER)	6
Jonna Malmgren (SWE)	10
Tuba Demir (TUR)	2
Mihaela Samoil (MDA)	8
Gultakin Shirinova (AZE)	5

Quarterfinals
Elena Ionescu (ROU)	7
Aliaksandra Bulava (ANA)	12
Anastasiia Iandushkina (ANA)	0
Mariia Vynnyk (UKR)	10
Felicitas Domajeva (NOR)	0
Jonna Malmgren (SWE)	4^{F}
Mihaela Samoil (MDA)	9
Róza Szenttamási (HUN)	4

Semifinals
Aliaksandra Bulava (ANA)	0
Mariia Vynnyk (UKR)	11
Jonna Malmgren (SWE)	8
Mihaela Samoil (MDA)	0

Final
Mariia Vynnyk (UKR)	0
Jonna Malmgren (SWE)	5

Repechage round
Tuba Demir (TUR)	4
Felicitas Domajeva (NOR)	0

Bronze medal match
Anastasiia Iandushkina (ANA)	13
Aliaksandra Bulava (ANA)	3
Tuba Demir (TUR)	4
Mihaela Samoil (MDA)	8

==== Women's freestyle 57 kg ====
Main bracket

Round of 16
Mia Olivier (FRA)	0
Solomiia Vynnyk (UKR)	10
Aikaterini Vekri (GRE)	0
Anastasia Kozlova (ANA)	9^{F}

Quarterfinals
Patrycja Strzelczyk (POL)	0
Solomiia Vynnyk (UKR)	11
Zhala Aliyeva (AZE)	5^{F}
Nesrin Syuleymanova (BUL)	0
Jana Petrović (SRB)	0
Elvira Süleyman Kamaloğlu (TUR)	10
Anastasia Kozlova (ANA)	2
Volha Hardzei (ANA)	11

Semifinals
Solomiia Vynnyk (UKR)	1
Zhala Aliyeva (AZE)	3
Elvira Süleyman Kamaloğlu (TUR)	8
Volha Hardzei (ANA)	0

Final
Zhala Aliyeva (AZE)	5
Elvira Süleyman Kamaloğlu (TUR)	3

Bronze medal match
Nesrin Syuleymanova (BUL)	0
Solomiia Vynnyk (UKR)	11
Jana Petrović (SRB)	0
Volha Hardzei (ANA)	5

==== Women's freestyle 59 kg ====
Main bracket

Round of 16
Nikolett Szabó (HUN)	10
Aleksandra Witos (POL)	0
Anastasiia Sidelnikova (ANA)	12
Asia Craparotta (ITA)	1
Amel Rebiha (FRA)	12
Fatme Shaban (BUL)	1
Anna Michalcová (CZE)	4
Alesia Hetmanava (ANA)	10^{F}
Ana Maria Puiu (ROU)	13
Kelsey Barnes (GBR)	2

Quarterfinals
Sevim Akbaş (TUR)	7
Nikolett Szabó (HUN)	4
Anastasiia Sidelnikova (ANA)	12^{F}
Amel Rebiha (FRA)	3
Ruzanna Mammadova (AZE)	3
Alesia Hetmanava (ANA)	4
Ana Maria Puiu (ROU)	12
Oksana Moskalova (UKR)	10

Semifinals
Sevim Akbaş (TUR)	1
Anastasiia Sidelnikova (ANA)	5
Alesia Hetmanava (ANA)	11
Ana Maria Puiu (ROU)	0

Final
Anastasiia Sidelnikova (ANA)	3
Alesia Hetmanava (ANA)	5

Repechage round
Asia Craparotta (ITA)	0
Amel Rebiha (FRA)	5^{F}
Anna Michalcová (CZE)	0
Ruzanna Mammadova (AZE)	4^{F}

Bronze medal match
Amel Rebiha (FRA)	6
Sevim Akbaş (TUR)	1
Ruzanna Mammadova (AZE)	8^{F}
Ana Maria Puiu (ROU)	0

==== Women's freestyle 62 kg ====
Main bracket

Round of 16
Viktoria Vesso (EST)	6^{F}
Selvi İlyasoğlu (TUR)	0
Naemi Leistner (GER)	0
Iryna Bondar (UKR)	10

Quarterfinals
Mirijam Hansen (NOR)	1
Viktoria Vesso (EST)	12
Yana Tretsiak (ANA)	12
Ineta Dantaitė (LTU)	2
Olha Padoshyk (POL)	0
Alina Kasabieva (ANA)	4^{F}
Iryna Bondar (UKR)	11
Iris Thiébaux (FRA)	0

Semifinals
Viktoria Vesso (EST)	4
Yana Tretsiak (ANA)	4
Alina Kasabieva (ANA)	4
Iryna Bondar (UKR)	11

Final
Yana Tretsiak (ANA)	0
Iryna Bondar (UKR)	11

Repechage round
Naemi Leistner (GER)	1
Iris Thiébaux (FRA)	5

Bronze medal match
Ineta Dantaitė (LTU)	0
Viktoria Vesso (EST)	13
Iris Thiébaux (FRA)	0
Alina Kasabieva (ANA)	2^{F}

==== Women's freestyle 65 kg ====
Main bracket

Round of 16
Nigar Mirzazada (AZE)	1
Maša Perović (SRB)	6
Kateryna Zelenykh (ROU)	4^{F}
Gergana Stoyanova (BUL)	0
Kseniya Tsiarenia (ANA)	3
Yuliia Pakhniuk (UKR)	1
Iva Gerić (CRO)	0
Laura Godino (ITA)	10

Quarterfinals
Ingrid Skard (NOR)	8^{F}
Maša Perović (SRB)	3
Kateryna Zelenykh (ROU)	10
Ekaterina Koshkina (ANA)	7^{F}
Nesrin Baş (TUR)	11
Kseniya Tsiarenia (ANA)	0
Laura Godino (ITA)	0
Irina Rîngaci (MDA)	10

Semifinals
Ingrid Skard (NOR)	2
Ekaterina Koshkina (ANA)	12
Nesrin Baş (TUR)	2
Irina Rîngaci (MDA)	8

Final
Ekaterina Koshkina (ANA)	3
Irina Rîngaci (MDA)	11

Bronze medal match
Kateryna Zelenykh (ROU)	10
Ingrid Skard (NOR)	0
Laura Godino (ITA)	0
Nesrin Baş (TUR)	9^{F}

==== Women's freestyle 68 kg ====
Main bracket

Round of 16
Karolina Pók (HUN)	10
Daniela Brasnarova (BUL)	0
Sophia Schäfle (GER)	15
Ayşe Erkan (TUR)	14
Elizaveta Petliakova (ANA)	3
Viktoryia Radzkova (ANA)	1

Quarterfinals
Veronica Braschi (ITA)	0
Karolina Pók (HUN)	5^{F}
Luciana Beda (MDA)	2
Manola Skobelska (UKR)	8
Emilija Jakovljević (SRB)	0
Sophia Schäfle (GER)	6
Elizaveta Petliakova (ANA)	6
Zsuzsanna Molnár (SVK)	3

Semifinals
Karolina Pók (HUN)	0
Manola Skobelska (UKR)	2
Sophia Schäfle (GER)	0
Elizaveta Petliakova (ANA)	6^{F}

Final
Manola Skobelska (UKR)	2
Elizaveta Petliakova (ANA)	10

Repechage round
Viktoryia Radzkova (ANA)	9
Zsuzsanna Molnár (SVK)	2

Bronze medal match
Luciana Beda (MDA)	3
Karolina Pók (HUN)	5
Viktoryia Radzkova (ANA)	6^{F}
Sophia Schäfle (GER)	0

==== Women's freestyle 72 kg ====
Main bracket

Round of 16
Emilia Creciun (MDA)	0
Nadiia Sokolovska (UKR)	6^{F}
Jennifer Rösler (GER)	6^{F}
Paula Rotaru (ROU)	0
Marziya Sadigova (AZE)	7
Eleni Chrysikaki (GRE)	3
Vincenzo Amendola (ITA)	4
Vanesa Georgieva (BUL)	14

Quarterfinals
Gia Kastelan (CRO)	2
Nadiia Sokolovska (UKR)	7
Jennifer Rösler (GER)	7
Olesia Bezuglova (ANA)	11
Alina Shauchuk (ANA)	10
Marziya Sadigova (AZE)	0
Vanesa Georgieva (BUL)	0
Bükrenaz Sert (TUR)	10

Semifinals
Nadiia Sokolovska (UKR)	7^{F}
Olesia Bezuglova (ANA)	0
Alina Shauchuk (ANA)	2
Bükrenaz Sert (TUR)	1

Final
Nadiia Sokolovska (UKR)	0
Alina Shauchuk (ANA)	4

Repechage round
Emilia Creciun (MDA)	0
Gia Kastelan (CRO)	10

Bronze medal match
Gia Kastelan (CRO)	4
Olesia Bezuglova (ANA)	6
Marziya Sadigova (AZE)	0
Bükrenaz Sert (TUR)	13

==== Women's freestyle 76 kg ====
Main bracket

Round of 16
Elvira Braun (SWE)	13
Marta Pajula (EST)	2

Quarterfinals
Olga Kozyreva (ANA)	8^{F}
Elvira Braun (SWE)	0
Daniela Tkachuk (POL)	0
Laura Kühn (GER)	7
Mariia Orlevych (UKR)	10
Zsófi Virág (HUN)	0
Nazar Batır (TUR)	8
Aliaksandra Kazlova (ANA)	3

Semifinals
Olga Kozyreva (ANA)	8
Laura Kühn (GER)	9
Mariia Orlevych (UKR)	3
Nazar Batır (TUR)	2

Final
Laura Kühn (GER)	0
Mariia Orlevych (UKR)	6

Bronze medal match
Daniela Tkachuk (POL)	4
Olga Kozyreva (ANA)	5^{F}
Zsófi Virág (HUN)	4
Nazar Batır (TUR)	2
