= 2023 Russian National Greco-Roman Wrestling Championships =

Russian Wrestling competition

2023 Russian Greco-Roman Nationals
- Host city: (Bashkortostan) Ufa, Russia
- Dates: February 6–10
- Stadium: Ufa Arena

The Russian National Greco-Roman Wrestling Championships 2023 also known as the Russian Greco-Roman Nationals 2023 was held in Ufa, Bashkortostan, Russia, from 6 to 10 February 2023.

== Medal overview ==
=== Men's Greco-Roman ===
Event	Gold	Silver	Bronze
55 kg	(Mordovia) Vitali Kabaloev	(Novosibirsk Oblast) Viktor Vedernikov	(Rostov Oblast) Mavlud Rizmanov
55 kg	(Mordovia) Vitali Kabaloev	(Novosibirsk Oblast) Viktor Vedernikov	(Moscow) Adam Ulbashev
60 kg	(Saint Petersburg) Dinislam Bammatov	(Yamalo-Nenets Autonomous Okrug) Emin Sefershaev	(Moscow Oblast) Sadyk Lalaev
60 kg	(Saint Petersburg) Dinislam Bammatov	(Yamalo-Nenets Autonomous Okrug) Emin Sefershaev	(Krasnodar Krai) Sergey Chegrev
63 kg	(Moscow Oblast) Astemir Bizhoev	(Mordovia) Zhambolat Lokyaev	(Moscow) Artur Petrosyan
63 kg	(Moscow Oblast) Astemir Bizhoev	(Mordovia) Zhambolat Lokyaev	(Samara Oblast) Khusinboi Arislanbekov
67 kg	(Saint Petersburg) Aslan Visaitov	(Tver Oblast) Muslim Imadaev	(Moscow Oblast) Adam Gauzhaev
67 kg	(Saint Petersburg) Aslan Visaitov	(Tver Oblast) Muslim Imadaev	(Mordovia) Ruslan Bichurin
72 kg	(Voronezh Oblast) Narek Ogonian	(Moscow Oblast) Artem Manavos	(Moscow Oblast) Arslan Zubairov
72 kg	(Voronezh Oblast) Narek Ogonian	(Moscow Oblast) Artem Manavos	(Mordovia) Aleksey Kiyankin
77 kg	(Novosibirsk Oblast) Sergey Stepanov	(Vladimir Oblast) Abuyazid Mantsigov	(Moscow Oblast) Adlet Tiuliubaev
77 kg	(Novosibirsk Oblast) Sergey Stepanov	(Vladimir Oblast) Abuyazid Mantsigov	(Tyumen Oblast) Sergey Kutuzov
82 kg	(Krasnodar Krai) Aues Gonibov	(Sevastopol) Rafael Iunusov	(Moscow) Stanislav Pseunov
82 kg	(Krasnodar Krai) Aues Gonibov	(Sevastopol) Rafael Iunusov	(Chechnya) Khamid Isaev
87 kg	(Saint Petersburg) Aleksandr Komarov	(Dagestan) Milad Alirzaev	(Krasnoyarsk Krai) Danila Kovalev
87 kg	(Saint Petersburg) Aleksandr Komarov	(Dagestan) Milad Alirzaev	(Dagestan) Magomed Murtazaliev
97 kg	(Vladimir Oblast) Artur Sargsian	(Krasnodar Krai) Aleksandr Golovin	(Moscow) Andemir Tanov
97 kg	(Vladimir Oblast) Artur Sargsian	(Krasnodar Krai) Aleksandr Golovin	(Krasnoyarsk Krai) Nikita Melnikov
130 kg	(Moscow) Sergey Semenov	(Kemerovo Oblast) Vitalii Shchur	(Bashkortostan) Nokhcho Labazanov
130 kg	(Moscow) Sergey Semenov	(Kemerovo Oblast) Vitalii Shchur	(Chechnya) Lom-Ali Akaev

== See also ==
- 2015 Russian National Greco-Roman Wrestling Championships
