= Matej Mandić =

Handball player (born 2002)

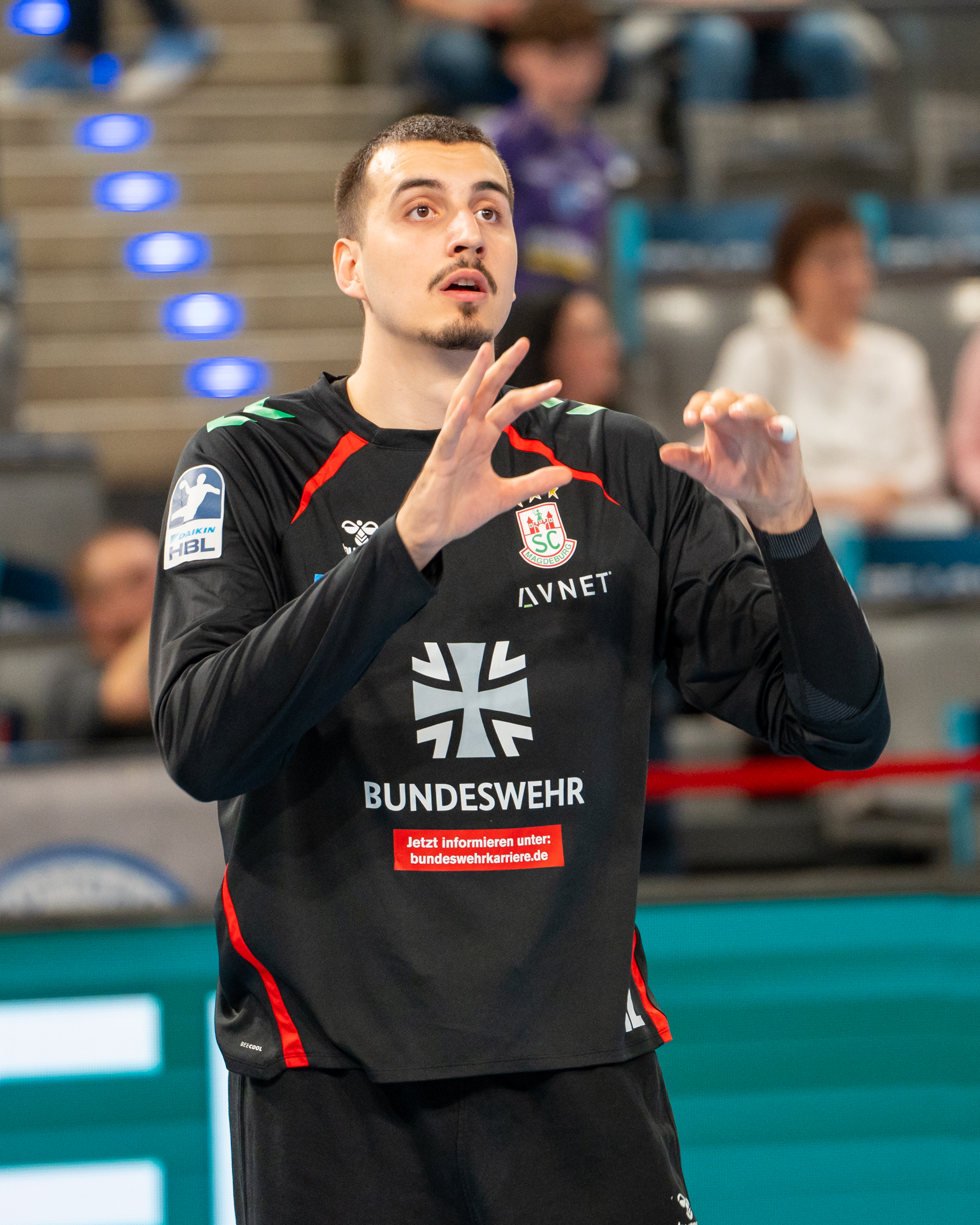
- Mandić in 2026

Personal information
- Nationality: Croatian
- Born: 2 May 2002 (age 24) Ljubuški, Bosnia and Herzegovina
- Height: 2.05 m (6 ft 9 in)

Sport
- Sport: Handball
- Position: Goalkeeper
- Current club: SC Magdeburg
- Number: 12

Youth career
- Years: Team
- –: RK Izviđač

Senior clubs
- Years: Team
- 2018–2021: RK Izviđač
- 2021–2025: RK Zagreb
- 2025–: SC Magdeburg
National team
Years	Team	Apps	(Gls)
2021–	Croatia	42	(3)
Medal record
European Championship
Bronze medal – third place	2026 Denmark/Norway/Sweden
- Updated on 2 February 2026

Matej Mandić (born 2 May 2002) is a handball player who plays for SC Magdeburg. Born in Bosnia and Herzegovina, he represents Croatia men's national handball team.

== Biography ==
Mandić was born on 2 May 2002 in Ljubuški, Bosnia and Herzegovina. He started playing handball for the local club Izviđač and won the title in 2019 and 2021. Since then, Mandić has been playing for the RK Zagreb. He is the cousin of Croatian handball player David Mandić, who also comes from Hardomilje near Ljubuški. They have played together at both RK Izviđač and at RK Zagreb.

Mandić helped RK Zagreb to qualify for the European Handball Champions League, breaking his own and other records in the number of shots saved by opponents on goal. His first major championship with the national team was the 2022 European Men's Handball Championship. He made 22 saves in a match against SC Magdeburg on 20 November 2024.

At the 2026 European Men's Handball Championship, Mandić won bronze medals with Croatia, losing against Germany in the semifinal and beating Iceland in the third-place playoff.
