= Abubakar Khaslakhanau =

Belarusian Greco-Roman wrestler

Personal information
- Full name: Abubakar Muratovich Khaslakhanau
- Born: Абубакар Муратович Хаслаханов; 25 April 2004 (age 22) Makhachkala, Dagestan, Russia
- Height: 1.88 m (6 ft 2 in)
- Weight: 97 kg (214 lb)

Sport
- Country: Belarus
- Sport: Amateur wrestling
- Event: Greco-Roman
Medal record
Men's Greco-Roman wrestling
Representing Belarus
World U23 Championships
Gold medal – first place	2026 Las Vegas	97 kg
European U23 Championships
Silver medal – second place	2026 Zrenjanin	97 kg
World Cadets Championships
Gold medal – first place	2021 Budapest	92 kg
European Cadets Championships
Bronze medal – third place	2021 Samokov	92 kg
Representing UWW
European U23 Championships
Bronze medal – third place	2025 Tirana	97 kg
Grand Prix
Silver medal – second place	2025 Mladenovac	97 kg
Representing Individual Neutral Athletes
European Championships
Bronze medal – third place	2024 Bucharest	97 kg
Grand Prix
Gold medal – first place	2024 Zagreb	97 kg
Silver medal – second place	2025 Zagreb	97 kg
World U23 Championships
Silver medal – second place	2024 Tirana	97 kg
European U23 Championships
Silver medal – second place	2024 Baku	97 kg
World U20 Championships
Gold medal – first place	2023 Amman	97 kg

Abubakar Khaslakhanau (Russian: Абубакар Муратович Хаслаханов; born 25 April 2004) is a Russian-Belarusian Greco-Roman wrestler of Kumyks origin, who currently competes at 97 kilograms.

== Wrestling career ==
Abubakar was born in Makhachkala, Republic of Dagestan, Russia. At the age of 6 he moved to Minsk, Republic of Belarus and at the age of 10 came to the Greco-Roman wrestling category of the sports club "Legion", where he started to be coached by Kirill Fomenko.

Abubakar is the winner of the championship of the Republic of Belarus among cadets in 2021, in the weight up to 92 kg, as well as the winner of the world championship 2021 and bronze medalist of the European championship among cadets in 2021. In 2022, he won the Junior Championship of the Republic of Belarus, in weight category up to 97 kg.

He won one of the bronze medals in the 97 kg event at the 2024 European Wrestling Championships held in Bucharest, Romania. He competed in the 97 kg event at the 2024 Summer Olympics in Paris, France.
