= Ruslan Bichurin =

Russian Greco-Roman wrestler (born 1997)

Руслн Бичурин Ruslan Bichurin
Personal information
- Native name: Russian: Руслан Рустямович Бичурин; Tatar: Руслан Рөстәм улы Бичурин;
- Full name: Ruslan Rustyamoivch Bichurin
- Nationality: (Russia) Russian
- Born: 14 February 1997 (age 29) Saransk, Mordovia, Russia

Sport
- Country: Russia
- Sport: Wrestling
- Weight class: 67 kg
- Rank: Master of sports
- Event: Greco-Roman
- Club: Aleksey Mishin's wrestling acadedmy
- Coached by: Petr Kargin; Mikhail Morozov
Medal record
Men's Greco-Roman
Representing Individual Neutral Athletes
European Championships
Silver medal – second place	2024 Bucharest	67 kg

Ruslan Rustyamoivch Bichurin (Russian: Руслан Рустямович Бичурин, Tatar: Руслан Рөстәм улы Бичурин; born 14 February 1997) is a Russian Greco-Roman wrestler of Volga Tatar ethnicity, who claimed the silver medal at the European Championships and 2024 Russian National Champion.

== Background ==
Bichurin was born on February 14, 1997, into a Volga Tatar family. He started wrestling at the age of eight. His first coach was Petr Kargin. He trains in Aleksey Mishin's wrestling academy in Saransk.

== Sport career ==
In cadet level, he had the silver medal from the 2012 Russian championships at 42 kilos. In 2018, he won his first national title at the senior level, he came first at the Russian cup. In 2019, he was bronze medalist at the U23 Russian championships. In 2022, Ruslan won the All-Russian Spartakiad in Kazan, in the final match he over world finalist Nazir Abdullaev. In 2023, he won the bronze medal at the Russian Championships in Ufa, Bashkortostan. and took the first place at the Oleg Karavayev international in Minsk, Belarus. In 2024, he won Russian championships and became runner-up at the European Championships.

He competed at the 2024 European Wrestling Olympic Qualification Tournament in Baku, Azerbaijan hoping to qualify for the 2024 Summer Olympics in Paris, France. He was eliminated in his first match and he did not qualify for the Olympics.

== Achievements ==
- 2018 Russian cup — 1st;
- 2022 Belt wrestling Russian Championships — 3rd;
- 2022 All-Russian Spartakiad — 1st;
- 2023 Russian Championships — 3rd;
- 2023 Oleg Karavayev international — 1st;
- 2024 Russian Championships — 1st;
- 2024 European Championships — 2nd;
