= Igali, Republic of Dagestan =

Igali Игали Игьали
- Selo
- Location within Republic of Dagestan Location within Russia
- Coordinates: 42°42′N 46°35′E
- Country: Russia
- Region: Republic of Dagestan
- District: Gumbetovsky District
- Time zone: UTC+3:00

Igali (Russian: Игали; Avar: Игьали) is a rural locality (a selo) and the administrative centre of Igalinsky Selsoviet, Gumbetovsky District, Republic of Dagestan, Russia. The population was 2,559 as of 2010. There are 19 streets.

== Geography ==
Igali is located 27 km southeast of Mekhelta (the district's administrative centre) by road, on the right bank of the Andiyskoye Koysu River. Tsanatl and Nizhny Aradirikh are the nearest rural localities.
