= 2021 European Wrestling Championships – Men's Greco-Roman 97 kg =

Wrestling competition

The Men's Greco-Roman 97 kg is a competition featured at the 2021 European Wrestling Championships, and was held in Warsaw, Poland on April 24 and April 25.

== Medalists ==
| Gold | Musa Evloev; Russia |
| Silver | Balázs Kiss; Hungary |
| Bronze | Mikalai Stadub; Belarus |
| Bronze | Nikoloz Kakhelashvili; Italy |

== Results ==
Legend

- F — Won by fall
- C — Won by 3 cautions given to the opponent
- R — Retired

Round of 16
Giorgi Melia (GEO) | 3
Mikalai Stadub (BLR) | 7
Tadeusz Michalik (POL) | 7
Arvi Savolainen (FIN) | 16^{C}
İbrahim Tığcı (TUR) | 1
Kiril Milov (BUL) | 3
Nikoloz Kakhelashvili (ITA) | 0
Mikheil Kajaia (SRB) | 0^{R}
Artur Omarov (CZE) | 2
Yevhenii Saveta (UKR) | 7^{C}
Musa Evloev (RUS) | 4
Markus Ragginger (AUT) | 0

Quarterfinals
Balázs Kiss (HUN) | 4
Zamir Magomedov (AZE) | 0
Mikalai Stadub (BLR) | 4^{F}
Arvi Savolainen (FIN) | 0
Kiril Milov (BUL) | 0
Nikoloz Kakhelashvili (ITA) | 2
Yevhenii Saveta (UKR) | 0
Musa Evloev (RUS) | 8

Semifinals
Balázs Kiss (HUN) | 3
Mikalai Stadub (BLR) | 1
Nikoloz Kakhelashvili (ITA) | 1
Musa Evloev (RUS) | 3

Final
Balázs Kiss (HUN) | 0
Musa Evloev (RUS) | 8

Repechage round 1
Markus Ragginger (AUT) | 7
Yevhenii Saveta (UKR) | 2

Bronze medal match
Zamir Magomedov (AZE) | 1
Mikalai Stadub (BLR) | 3
Markus Ragginger (AUT) | 0
Nikoloz Kakhelashvili (ITA) | 4

== Final standing ==
| Rank | Athlete |
|---|---|
| 1st place, gold medalist(s) | Musa Evloev (RUS) |
| 2nd place, silver medalist(s) | Balázs Kiss (HUN) |
| 3rd place, bronze medalist(s) | Mikalai Stadub (BLR) |
| 3rd place, bronze medalist(s) | Nikoloz Kakhelashvili (ITA) |
| 5 | Zamir Magomedov (AZE) |
| 5 | Markus Ragginger (AUT) |
| 7 | Yevhenii Saveta (UKR) |
| 8 | Arvi Savolainen (FIN) |
| 9 | Kiril Milov (BUL) |
| 10 | Giorgi Melia (GEO) |
| 11 | İbrahim Tığcı (TUR) |
| 12 | Tadeusz Michalik (POL) |
| 13 | Artur Omarov (CZE) |
| 14 | Mikheil Kajaia (SRB) |
