= 2021 World Wrestling Championships – Men's Greco-Roman 97 kg =

Wrestling competitions

Men's Greco-Roman 97 kg at the 2021 World Championships
- Venue: Nye Jordal Amfi
- Dates: 8–9 October 2021
- Competitors: 27 from 27 nations

Medalists
gold medal	Mohammad Hadi Saravi	Iran
silver medal	Alex Szőke	Hungary
bronze medal	Artur Sargsian	RWF
bronze medal	G'Angelo Hancock	United States

The men's Greco-Roman 97 kilograms is a competition featured at the 2021 World Wrestling Championships, and was held in Oslo, Norway on 8 and 9 October.

This Greco-Roman wrestling competition consists of a single-elimination tournament, with a repechage used to determine the winner of two bronze medals. The two finalists face off for gold and silver medals. Each wrestler who loses to one of the two finalists moves into the repechage, culminating in a pair of bronze medal matches featuring the semifinal losers each facing the remaining repechage opponent from their half of the bracket.

== Results ==
Legend

- F — Won by fall
- R — Retired

=== Final ===
Final
Mohammad Hadi Saravi (IRI)	3
Alex Szőke (HUN)	1

=== Top half ===
Round of 32
Gerard Kurniczak (POL)	4
Yuta Nara (JPN)	0
Yerulan Iskakov (KAZ)	0
Giorgi Melia (GEO)	4^{F}
Pontus Lund (SWE)	2
Murat Lokyaev (AZE)	8
Mikheil Kajaia (SRB)	3
Vilius Laurinaitis (LTU)	5
Nikoloz Kakhelashvili (ITA)	9
Ioannis Narlidis (CAN)	0

Round of 16
Mohammad Hadi Saravi (IRI)	6
Artur Sargsian (RWF)	4
Gerard Kurniczak (POL)	0^{R}
Giorgi Melia (GEO)	3
Murat Lokyaev (AZE)	1
Vilius Laurinaitis (LTU)	1
Nikoloz Kakhelashvili (ITA)	2
Mikalai Stadub (BLR)	1

Quarterfinals
Mohammad Hadi Saravi (IRI)	9
Giorgi Melia (GEO)	1
Vilius Laurinaitis (LTU)	0
Nikoloz Kakhelashvili (ITA)	4

Semifinals
Mohammad Hadi Saravi (IRI)	5
Nikoloz Kakhelashvili (ITA)	0

=== Bottom half ===
Round of 32
İbrahim Tığcı (TUR)	6
Laokratis Kesidis (GRE)	0
Kiril Milov (BUL)	5
Marcus Worren (NOR)	0
Ravi Rathee (IND)	0
Park Je-woo (KOR)	8
Beksultan Makhmudov (KGZ)	4
Mathias Bak (DEN)	2
Peter Öhler (GER)	3
Mélonin Noumonvi (FRA)	1
Artur Omarov (CZE)	3^{R}
Yevhenii Saveta (UKR)	3

Round of 16
G'Angelo Hancock (USA)	5
İbrahim Tığcı (TUR)	0
Kiril Milov (BUL)	5
Park Je-woo (KOR)	1
Beksultan Makhmudov (KGZ)	3
Peter Öhler (GER)	5
Yevhenii Saveta (UKR)	1
Alex Szőke (HUN)	6

Quarterfinals
G'Angelo Hancock (USA)	6
Kiril Milov (BUL)	0
Peter Öhler (GER)	1
Alex Szőke (HUN)	4

Semifinals
G'Angelo Hancock (USA)	4
Alex Szőke (HUN)	4

=== Repechage ===
Repechage round 2
Artur Sargsian (RWF)	5
Giorgi Melia (GEO)	0
Yevhenii Saveta (UKR)	3
Peter Öhler (GER)	5

Bronze medals
Artur Sargsian (RWF)	6
Nikoloz Kakhelashvili (ITA)	1
Peter Öhler (GER)	0^{R}
G'Angelo Hancock (USA)	3

== Final standing ==
Rank	Athlete
1st place, gold medalist(s)	Mohammad Hadi Saravi (IRI)
2nd place, silver medalist(s)	Alex Szőke (HUN)
3rd place, bronze medalist(s)	Artur Sargsian (RWF)
3rd place, bronze medalist(s)	G'Angelo Hancock (USA)
5	Nikoloz Kakhelashvili (ITA)
5	Peter Öhler (GER)
7	Giorgi Melia (GEO)
8	Yevhenii Saveta (UKR)
9	Kiril Milov (BUL)
10	Vilius Laurinaitis (LTU)
11	Park Je-woo (KOR)
12	Murat Lokyaev (AZE)
13	Beksultan Makhmudov (KGZ)
14	İbrahim Tığcı (TUR)
15	Gerard Kurniczak (POL)
16	Mikheil Kajaia (SRB)
17	Mathias Bak (DEN)
18	Pontus Lund (SWE)
19	Mikalai Stadub (BLR)
20	Mélonin Noumonvi (FRA)
21	Artur Omarov (CZE)
22	Yuta Nara (JPN)
23	Yerulan Iskakov (KAZ)
24	Marcus Worren (NOR)
25	Laokratis Kesidis (GRE)
26	Ravi Rathee (IND)
27	Ioannis Narlidis (CAN)
