= 2023 World Wrestling Championships – Men's Greco-Roman 97 kg =

Wrestling competitions

Men's Greco-Roman 97 kg at the 2023 World Championships
- Venue: Štark Arena
- Dates: 22–23 September 2023
- Competitors: 37 from 34 nations

Medalists
gold medal	Gabriel Rosillo	Cuba
silver medal	Artur Aleksanyan	Armenia
bronze medal	Artur Omarov	Czech Republic
bronze medal	Mohammad Hadi Saravi	Iran

The men's Greco-Roman 97 kilograms is a competition featured at the 2023 World Wrestling Championships, and was held in Belgrade, Serbia on 22 and 23 September 2023.

This freestyle wrestling competition consists of a single-elimination tournament, with a repechage used to determine the winner of two bronze medals. The two finalists face off for gold and silver medals. Each wrestler who loses to one of the two finalists moves into the repechage, culminating in a pair of bronze medal matches featuring the semifinal losers each facing the remaining repechage opponent from their half of the bracket.

== Results ==
Legend

- F — Won by fall
- R — Retired

=== Finals ===
Semifinals		Final
Artur Aleksanyan (ARM)	9
Mindaugas Venckaitis (LTU)	0	Artur Aleksanyan (ARM)	3
Gabriel Rosillo (CUB)	3	Gabriel Rosillo (CUB)	3
Mohammad Hadi Saravi (IRI)	0

=== Top half ===
==== Section 1 ====
Round of 64
Laokratis Kesidis (GRE)	3
Mohamed Ali Gabr (EGY)	1

Round of 32
Artur Aleksanyan (ARM)	10
Nicu Ojog (ROU)	4
Joe Rau (USA)	4
Filip Smetko (CRO)	1
Laokratis Kesidis (GRE)	8
Beksultan Makhmudov (KGZ)	10
Adem Boudjemline (ALG)	1
Artur Omarov (CZE)	5

Round of 16
Artur Aleksanyan (ARM)	9
Joe Rau (USA)	0
Beksultan Makhmudov (KGZ)	1
Artur Omarov (CZE)	5

Quarterfinals
Artur Aleksanyan (ARM)	9
Artur Omarov (CZE)	0

==== Section 2 ====
Round of 64
Mikheil Kajaia (SRB)	2
Metehan Başar (TUR)	1
Arvi Savolainen (FIN)	8
Yuta Nara (JPN)	0

Round of 32
Tamás Lévai (HUN)	5
Li Yiming (CHN)	1
Serhii Omelin (UKR)	1
Mikheil Kajaia (SRB)	5
Arvi Savolainen (FIN)	10
Tyrone Sterkenburg (NED)	7^{R}
Mindaugas Venckaitis (LTU)	7
Arif Niftullayev (AZE)	3^{R}

Round of 16
Tamás Lévai (HUN)	5
Mikheil Kajaia (SRB)	7
Arvi Savolainen (FIN)	0
Mindaugas Venckaitis (LTU)	4^{F}

Quarterfinals
Mikheil Kajaia (SRB)	0
Mindaugas Venckaitis (LTU)	9

=== Bottom half ===
==== Section 3 ====
Round of 64
Gabriel Rosillo (CUB)	9
Peter Öhler (GER)	1

Round of 32
Nikoloz Kakhelashvili (ITA)	1
Olzhas Syrlybay (KAZ)	1
Abubakar Khaslakhanau (AIN)	9
Mathias Bak (DEN)	5
Gabriel Rosillo (CUB)	4
Artur Sargsian (AIN)	1^{R}
Igor Queiroz (BRA)	2
Rustam Assakalov (UZB)	11

Round of 16
Nikoloz Kakhelashvili (ITA)	1
Abubakar Khaslakhanau (AIN)	3
Gabriel Rosillo (CUB)	6
Rustam Assakalov (UZB)	4

Quarterfinals
Abubakar Khaslakhanau (AIN)	5
Gabriel Rosillo (CUB)	8

==== Section 4 ====
Round of 64
Shailesh Rajendra Shelke (UWW)	0
Aleksandar Stjepanetic (SWE)	6

Round of 32
Felix Baldauf (NOR)	3
Giorgi Melia (GEO)	1
Kevin Mejía (HON)	1
Aleksandar Stjepanetic (SWE)	5
Kim Seung-jun (KOR)	0
Gerard Kurniczak (POL)	4
Markus Ragginger (AUT)	1
Mohammad Hadi Saravi (IRI)	3

Round of 16
Felix Baldauf (NOR)	9
Aleksandar Stjepanetic (SWE)	0
Gerard Kurniczak (POL)	1
Mohammad Hadi Saravi (IRI)	7

Quarterfinals
Felix Baldauf (NOR)	1
Mohammad Hadi Saravi (IRI)	4

=== Repechage ===
Repechage round 1
Peter Öhler (GER)	WO
Artur Sargsian (AIN)

Repechage round 2
Nicu Ojog (ROU)	2^{F}
Joe Rau (USA)	1
Peter Öhler (GER)	5
Rustam Assakalov (UZB)	3

Repechage round 3
Nicu Ojog (ROU)	0
Artur Omarov (CZE)	5
Peter Öhler (GER)	5
Abubakar Khaslakhanau (AIN)	7

Bronze medals
Artur Omarov (CZE)	3
Mindaugas Venckaitis (LTU)	1
Abubakar Khaslakhanau (AIN)	1
Mohammad Hadi Saravi (IRI)	4

Olympic wrestle-off
Mindaugas Venckaitis (LTU)	1
Abubakar Khaslakhanau (AIN)	5^{F}

== Final standing ==
Rank	Athlete
1st place, gold medalist(s)	Gabriel Rosillo (CUB)
2nd place, silver medalist(s)	Artur Aleksanyan (ARM)
3rd place, bronze medalist(s)	Artur Omarov (CZE)
3rd place, bronze medalist(s)	Mohammad Hadi Saravi (IRI)
5	Abubakar Khaslakhanau (AIN)
5	Mindaugas Venckaitis (LTU)
7	Peter Öhler (GER)
8	Arvi Savolainen (FIN)
9	Mikheil Kajaia (SRB)
10	Felix Baldauf (NOR)
11	Nicu Ojog (ROU)
12	Rustam Assakalov (UZB)
13	Aleksandar Stjepanetic (SWE)
14	Laokratis Kesidis (GRE)
15	Beksultan Makhmudov (KGZ)
16	Tamás Lévai (HUN)
17	Gerard Kurniczak (POL)
18	Nikoloz Kakhelashvili (ITA)
19	Joe Rau (USA)
20	Mathias Bak (DEN)
21	Igor Queiroz (BRA)
22	Olzhas Syrlybay (KAZ)
23	Metehan Başar (TUR)
24	Mohamed Ali Gabr (EGY)
25	Giorgi Melia (GEO)
26	Markus Ragginger (AUT)
27	Filip Smetko (CRO)
28	Adem Boudjemline (ALG)
29	Li Yiming (CHN)
30	Serhii Omelin (UKR)
31	Kevin Mejía (HON)
32	Tyrone Sterkenburg (NED)
33	Arif Niftullayev (AZE)
34	Artur Sargsian (AIN)
35	Kim Seung-jun (KOR)
36	Yuta Nara (JPN)
DQ	Shailesh Rajendra Shelke (UWW)

Qualified for the 2024 Summer Olympics

- Shailesh Rajendra Shelke of UWW originally finished 36th, but was disqualified.
