= 2010 World Wrestling Championships – Men's Greco-Roman 96 kg =

Men's Greco-Roman 96 kg at the 2010 World Championships
- Venue: Olympic Stadium
- Dates: 6 September 2010
- Competitors: 34 from 34 nations

Medalists
gold medal	Amir Aliakbari	Iran
silver medal	Tsimafei Dzeinichenka	Belarus
bronze medal	Aslanbek Khushtov	Russia
bronze medal	Jimmy Lidberg	Sweden

The men's Greco-Roman 96 kilograms is a competition featured at the 2010 World Wrestling Championships, and was held at the Olympic Stadium in Moscow, Russia on 6 September.

== Results ==
Legend

- F — Won by fall

=== Finals ===
Semifinals			Final
Aslanbek Khushtov (RUS)	0	0
Amir Aliakbari (IRI)	1	1	Amir Aliakbari (IRI)	2	1
Tsimafei Dzeinichenka (BLR)	1	3	Tsimafei Dzeinichenka (BLR)	2	0
Jimmy Lidberg (SWE)	0	0

=== Top half ===
==== Section 1 ====
Round of 64

Round of 32
Yahia Abutabeekh (JOR)	0	1	0
Asset Mambetov (KAZ)	1	0	1
Aslanbek Khushtov (RUS)	3	4
Aldas Lukošaitis (LTU)	0	0
Oleg Kryoka (UKR)	4	0	3
Sargis Tonoyan (ARM)	0	6	0
Hughes Bella-Lufu (RSA)	0	0
Robert Papp (ROU)	1	7

Round of 16
Asset Mambetov (KAZ)	2	3	0
Aslanbek Khushtov (RUS)	0	9	3
Oleg Kryoka (UKR)	0	2	1
Robert Papp (ROU)	1	0	4

Quarterfinals
Aslanbek Khushtov (RUS)	3	6
Robert Papp (ROU)	0	0

==== Section 2 ====
Round of 64

Round of 32
Davyd Saldadze (UZB)	0	0
Amir Aliakbari (IRI)	1	1
Soso Jabidze (GEO)	0	1	0
Mohamed Abdelfatah (EGY)	1	0	1
David Vála (CZE)	0	1	2
Lukas Hörmann (AUT)	1	0	0
Kaloyan Dinchev (BUL)	4	1
Filip Köszeghy (SVK)	0	0

Round of 16
Amir Aliakbari (IRI)	1	1
Mohamed Abdelfatah (EGY)	0	0
David Vála (CZE)	0	1
Kaloyan Dinchev (BUL)	1	2

Quarterfinals
Amir Aliakbari (IRI)	3	1
Kaloyan Dinchev (BUL)	0	0

=== Bottom half ===
==== Section 3 ====
Round of 64

Round of 32
Richard Karelson (EST)	0	0
Justin Ruiz (USA)	1	1
Tsimafei Dzeinichenka (BLR)	2	1
Sabuhi Humbatov (AZE)	0	0
Marin Cazac (MDA)	0	0
Yunior Estrada (CUB)	1	6
Hou Zhenlin (CHN)	0	0
Ahmet Taçyıldız (TUR)	3	3

Round of 16
Justin Ruiz (USA)	0	2	0
Tsimafei Dzeinichenka (BLR)	1	0	4
Yunior Estrada (CUB)	0	2	3
Ahmet Taçyıldız (TUR)	3	0	0

Quarterfinals
Tsimafei Dzeinichenka (BLR)	4	1
Yunior Estrada (CUB)	0	0

==== Section 4 ====
Round of 64
An Chang-gun (KOR)	1	1
Hassene Fkiri (AUS)	0	0
Daigoro Timoncini (ITA)	0	2	1
Siniša Hogač (CRO)	1	0	0

Round of 32
Katsuya Kitamura (JPN)	0	1	1
Mirko Englich (GER)	2	0	1
Przemysław Malinowski (POL)	6^{F}
Christian Scarci (SMR)	0
Jimmy Lidberg (SWE)	0	1	2
Iván Németh (HUN)	2	0	0
An Chang-gun (KOR)	0	0
Daigoro Timoncini (ITA)	1	1

Round of 16
Mirko Englich (GER)	2	1
Przemysław Malinowski (POL)	0	0
Jimmy Lidberg (SWE)	0	1	1
Daigoro Timoncini (ITA)	1	0	0

Quarterfinals
Mirko Englich (GER)	0	0
Jimmy Lidberg (SWE)	1	4

=== Repechage ===
Repechage round 2
Davyd Saldadze (UZB)	2	1
Mohamed Abdelfatah (EGY)	0	0
Sabuhi Humbatov (AZE)	0	0
Justin Ruiz (USA)	1	2

Repechage round 3
Davyd Saldadze (UZB)	1	1
Kaloyan Dinchev (BUL)	0	0
Justin Ruiz (USA)	2	0	1
Yunior Estrada (CUB)	0	7	0

Bronze medals
Davyd Saldadze (UZB)	1	0
Aslanbek Khushtov (RUS)	2	6^{F}
Justin Ruiz (USA)	0	0
Jimmy Lidberg (SWE)	1	1
