= 2019 European Wrestling Championships – Men's Greco-Roman 97 kg =

The Men's Greco-Roman 97 kg is a competition featured at the 2019 European Wrestling Championships, and was held in Bucharest, Romania on April 13 and April 14.

== Medalists ==
Gold	Musa Evloev; Russia
Silver	Kiril Milov; Bulgaria
Bronze	Daigoro Timoncini; Italy
Bronze	Elias Kuosmanen; Finland

== Results ==
Legend

- F — Won by fall

=== Final ===
Final
Musa Evloev (RUS)	9
Kiril Milov (BUL)	0

=== Top half ===
Round of 32

Round of 16
Vilius Laurinaitis (LTU)	0
Daigoro Timoncini (ITA)	2
Felix Baldauf (NOR)	3
Dorin Pîrvan (ROU)	1
Giorgi Melia (GEO)	3
Fatih Başköy (TUR)	7
Musa Evloev (RUS)	7
Mikheil Kajaia (SRB)	1

Quarterfinals
Daigoro Timoncini (ITA)	3
Felix Baldauf (NOR)	3
Fatih Başköy (TUR)	1
Musa Evloev (RUS)	7

Semifinals
Daigoro Timoncini (ITA)	1
Musa Evloev (RUS)	3

=== Bottom half ===
Round of 32
Artur Shahinyan (ARM)	4
Pontus Lund (SWE)	0
Siarhei Staradub (BLR)	1
Artur Omarov (CZE)	1
Ádám Varga (HUN)	3
Kiril Milov (BUL)	5
Tamás Soós (SVK)	0
Ramsin Azizsir (GER)	9
Mykola Krysov (UKR)	6
Mélonin Noumonvi (FRA)	4
Elias Kuosmanen (FIN)	8
Michail Iosifidis (GRE)	0
Damian von Euw (SUI)	3
Daniel Gastl (AUT)	6

Round of 16
Orkhan Nuriyev (AZE)	3
Artur Shahinyan (ARM)	0
Siarhei Staradub (BLR)	0
Kiril Milov (BUL)	3
Ramsin Azizsir (GER)	3
Mykola Krysov (UKR)	3
Elias Kuosmanen (FIN)	2
Daniel Gastl (AUT)	0

Quarterfinals
Orkhan Nuriyev (AZE)	1
Kiril Milov (BUL)	1
Mykola Krysov (UKR)	7
Elias Kuosmanen (FIN)	11

Semifinals
Kiril Milov (BUL)	3
Elias Kuosmanen (FIN)	1

=== Repechage ===
Repechage round 1
Ádám Varga (HUN)	2
Siarhei Staradub (BLR)	1

Repechage round 2
Mikheil Kajaia (SRB)	2
Fatih Başköy (TUR)	3
Ádám Varga (HUN)	1
Orkhan Nuriyev (AZE)	2

Bronze medal match
Fatih Başköy (TUR)	1
Daigoro Timoncini (ITA)	2
Orkhan Nuriyev (AZE)	2
Elias Kuosmanen (FIN)	3
