= G'Angelo Hancock =

American Greco-Roman wrestler (born 1997)

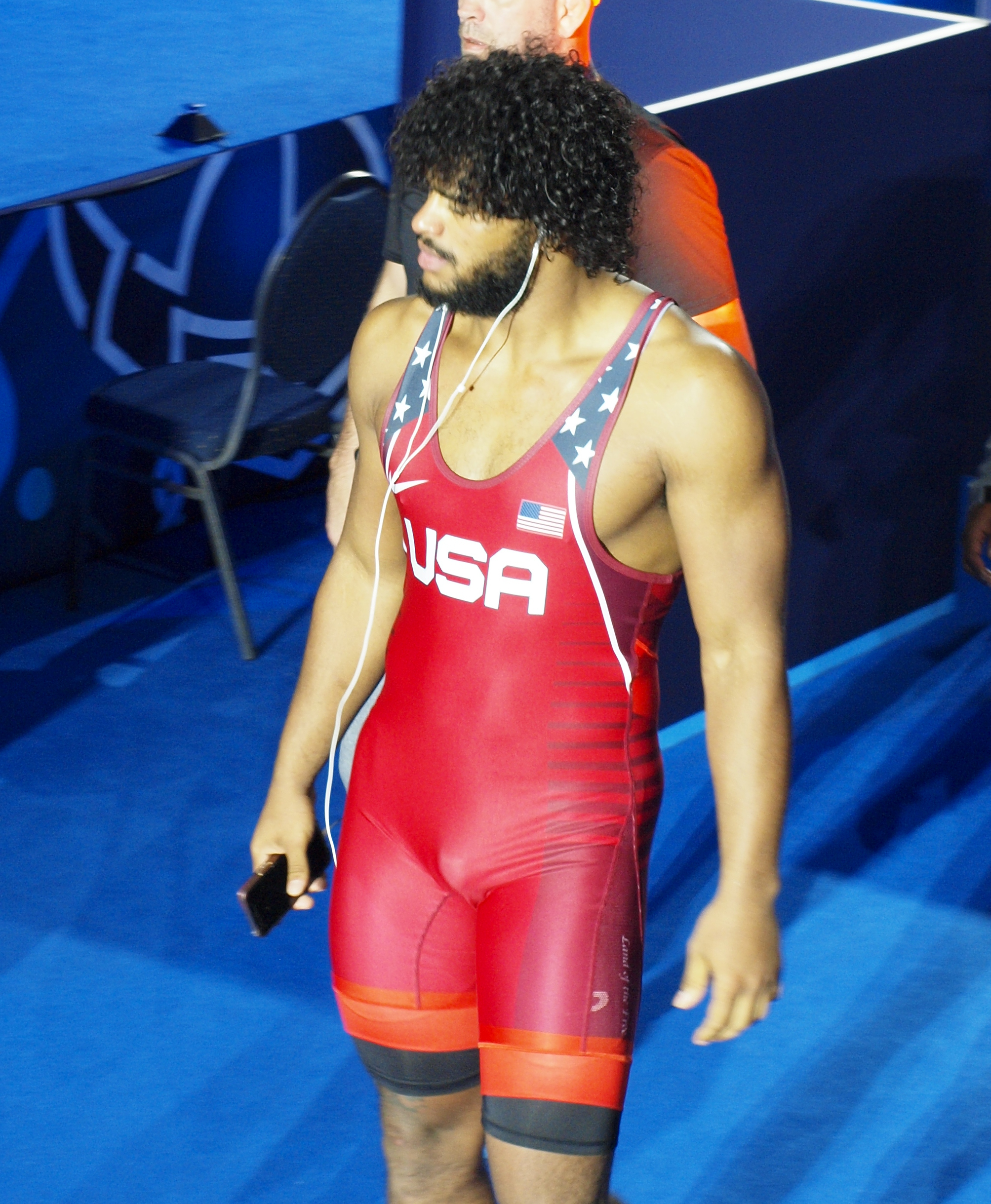
- Hancock at the 2021 World Wrestling Championships in Oslo

Personal information
- Full name: Tracy G'Angelo Hancock
- Born: July 27, 1997 (age 29) Fountain, Colorado, U.S.

Sport
- Country: United States
- Sport: Wrestling
- Weight class: 97 kg
- Event: Greco-Roman
- Club: Sunkist Kids Wrestling Club
- Team: USA
Medal record
Men's Greco-Roman wrestling
Representing the United States
World Championships
Bronze medal – third place	2021 Oslo	97 kg
Pan American Games
Silver medal – second place	2019 Lima	97 kg
Pan American Championships
Gold medal – first place	2020 Ottawa	97 kg
Silver medal – second place	2019 Buenos Aires	97 kg
Bronze medal – third place	2017 Lauro de Freitas	98 kg
Junior World Championships
Bronze medal – third place	2016 Mâcon	96 kg

G'Angelo Hancock
Professional wrestling career
- Ring name(s): G'Angelo Hancock; Tavion Heights
- Billed height: 6 ft 2 in (188 cm)
- Billed weight: 214 lb (97 kg)
- Billed from: Fountain, Colorado
- Trained by: WWE Performance Center; The Great Muta; Naomichi Marufuji
- Debut: December 1, 2022

Tracy G'Angelo Hancock (born July 27, 1997) is an American professional wrestler and former Greco-Roman wrestler. He is signed to WWE, where he performs on the NXT brand under the ring name Tavion Heights. He is a former one-time NXT Tag Team Champion.

An accomplished amateur wrestler, Hancock won a bronze medal in the 97 kg event at the 2021 World Wrestling Championships held in Oslo, Norway. At the 2020 Pan American Wrestling Championships held in Ottawa, Canada, he won a gold medal in the 97 kg event. Hancock is also a silver medalist at the 2019 Pan American Games held in Lima, Peru. He represented the United States in Greco-Roman wrestling at 97 kg, at the 2020 Summer Olympics in Tokyo, Japan.

== Greco-Roman wrestling career ==
In 2016, Hancock competed at the United States Olympic Team Trials hoping to represent the United States at the 2016 Summer Olympics in Rio de Janeiro, Brazil. He finished in third place in the 98 kg event.

Hancock won one of the bronze medals in the 98 kg event at the 2017 Pan American Wrestling Championships held in Lauro de Freitas, Brazil. He also competed in the 98 kg event at the 2017 World Wrestling Championships held in Paris without winning a medal. He won his first match against Fatih Başköy and lost his next match against Artur Aleksanyan. Aleksanyan went on to win the gold medal. At the 2018 World Wrestling Championships held in Budapest, Hungary, he was eliminated in his first match in the 97 kg event.

In 2019, Hancock won the silver medal in his event at the Pan American Wrestling Championships held in Buenos Aires, Argentina. In that same year, he represented the United States at the Pan American Games held in Lima, Peru and he won the silver medal in the 97 kg event. In the final, he lost against Gabriel Rosillo of Cuba. He also competed in the 97 kg event at the 2019 World Wrestling Championships held in Nur-Sultan, Kazakhstan where he was eliminated in his second match by Mélonin Noumonvi of France.

Hancock competed in the 97 kg event at the 2020 Summer Olympics held in Tokyo, Japan. He won his first match against Mikheil Kajaia of Serbia and he was then eliminated in his next match by Tadeusz Michalik of Poland.

After qualifying for Team USA for the 2022 World Championships at 97 kg at Final X in New York City, Hancock announced his retirement on August 9, 2022, and was replaced on Team USA by Braxton Amos.

== Professional wrestling career ==
=== WWE (2022–present) ===
==== Debut and No Quarter Catch Crew (2022–2025) ====
In August 2022 after departing Greco-Roman wrestling, Hancock signed a developmental contract with the WWE. On December 1, 2022, Hancock made his debut on NXT Level Up under the name Tavion Heights in a losing effort against Channing "Stacks" Lorenzo. On December 12, 2023, Heights was announced as one of the competitors for the NXT Men's Breakout Tournament. Heights defeated Luca Crusifino in the first round of the tournament but was defeated by eventual winner Oba Femi in the semi-finals.

On the June 25, 2024 episode of NXT, Heights defeated No Quarter Catch Crew's (NQCC) Damon Kemp in an initiation match to join the stable, turning heel. On the July 11 episode of Impact!, Heights made his Total Nonstop Action Wrestling (TNA) debut appearance where he celebrated NQCC leader's Charlie Dempsey match victory against The Rascalz's Zachary Wentz and made his TNA in-ring debut at Slammiversary on July 20 where NQCC lost to The Rascalz (Wentz, Trey Miguel and Wes Lee) in a six-man tag team match. On July 30, Heights competed in his first title match at Week 1 of NXT: The Great American Bash, losing to Tony D'Angelo 1–2 under British Rounds Rule for the NXT Heritage Cup. Heights returned on the September 10 episode of NXT, assisting Dempsey in retaining the NXT Heritage Cup against Je'Von Evans. At NXT Deadline on December 7, Borne and Heights faced NXT Tag Team Champions Nathan Frazer and Axiom for the titles for the first time but lost the match.

Following NXT Battleground on May 25, 2025, Heights and the rest of NQCC effectively turned face due to the outpouring support for Myles Borne during his NXT Championship match against Oba Femi despite failing to win the title. On the July 29 episode of NXT, Heights defeated Dempsey with the stipulation of Heights allowed to leave NQCC to pursue singles opportunities.

==== Singles competition (2025–present) ====
Immediately after, Heights began a feud with NXT North American Champion Ethan Page. This led to Heights teaming up with fellow Olympic wrestler Tyra Mae Steele whereas Page teaming with Chelsea Green at NXT Heatwave on August 24, where the former team lost to the latter team in a mixed tag team match. On the September 9 episode of NXT, Heights defeated Page in a flag match. At NXT No Mercy on September 27, Heights failed to defeat Page for the NXT North American Championship. On the December 30 episode of NXT, Heights set the record for the fastest win on NXT when he defeated Lexis King in eight seconds in the finals of the Speed Championship #1 Contender's tournament but failed to defeat Jasper Troy for the title on the January 13, 2026 episode of NXT. Heights would later rekindle with former NQCC stablemate Myles Borne to defeat The Vanity Project (Brad Baylor and Ricky Smokes) on the August 4, 2026 episode of NXT to win the NXT Tag Team Championship. At NXT Heatwave on August 30, Borne lost both titles to The Vanity Project: the NXT Tag Team Championship to Baylor and Smokes and the NXT North American Championship to Jackson Drake, with the NXT Tag Team Championship reign ending at 25 days. Following the NXT North American Championship match, Borne took out Heights, teasing a heel turn. Two weeks later, Borne apologised to Heights only to immediately attack him, solidifying his heel turn.

=== Pro Wrestling Noah (2024) ===
In July 2024, it was announced that Hancock, as Tavion Heights, would be one of two NXT representatives (the other being Josh Briggs) to enter Pro Wrestling Noah's N-1 Victory tournament. Heights was placed in the B-block and finished the tournament with 8 points, including an upset win over former 3-time GHC Heavyweight Champion Kenoh, but failed to advance to the finals. Heights received heavy praise for his performances from fans, Keiji Muto, and Naomichi Marufuji. During their short tenure in Pro Wrestling Noah, both Heights and Briggs received training from Muto and Marufuji.

== Championships and accomplishments ==
=== Amateur wrestling ===
Year	Tournament	Location	Result	Event
2016	Junior World Championships	Mâcon, France	3rd	Greco-Roman 96 kg
2017	Pan American Championships	Lauro de Freitas, Brazil	3rd	Greco-Roman 98 kg
2019	Pan American Championships	Buenos Aires, Argentina	2nd	Greco-Roman 97 kg
2019	Pan American Games	Lima, Peru	2nd	Greco-Roman 97 kg
2020	Pan American Championships	Ottawa, Canada	1st	Greco-Roman 97 kg
2021	World Championships	Oslo, Norway	3rd	Greco-Roman 97 kg

=== Professional wrestling ===
- Pro Wrestling Illustrated
  - Ranked No. 350 of the top singles wrestlers in the PWI 500 in 2026
- WWE
  - NXT Tag Team Championship (1 time) – with Myles Borne
  - WWE Speed Championship #1 Contender Tournament (December 17, 2025 – January 13, 2026)
