= 2018 World Wrestling Championships – Men's Greco-Roman 97 kg =

Men's Greco-Roman 97 kg at the 2018 World Championships
- Venue: László Papp Budapest Sports Arena
- Dates: 27–28 October 2018
- Competitors: 34 from 34 nations

Medalists
gold medal	Musa Evloev	Russia
silver medal	Kiril Milov	Bulgaria
bronze medal	Mikheil Kajaia	Serbia
bronze medal	Mehdi Aliyari	Iran

The men's Greco-Roman 97 kilograms is a competition featured at the 2018 World Wrestling Championships, and was held in Budapest, Hungary on 27 and 28 October.

== Results ==
Legend

- F — Won by fall
- WO — Won by walkover

=== Finals ===
Semifinals		Final
Kiril Milov (BUL)	3
Mikheil Kajaia (SRB)	0	Kiril Milov (BUL)	2
Musa Evloev (RUS)	3	Musa Evloev (RUS)	7
Artur Aleksanyan (ARM)	1

=== Top half ===
==== Section 1 ====
Round of 64

Round of 32
Balázs Kiss (HUN)	4^{F}
Chen Yanan (CHN)	4
Tamás Soós (SVK)	4
Kiril Milov (BUL)	12
Choucri Atafi (MAR)	4
Hardeep Singh (IND)	8
Yuta Nara (JPN)	5
Laokratis Kesidis (GRE)	8

Round of 16
Balázs Kiss (HUN)	0
Kiril Milov (BUL)	9
Hardeep Singh (IND)	1
Laokratis Kesidis (GRE)	4

Quarterfinals
Kiril Milov (BUL)	9
Laokratis Kesidis (GRE)	0

==== Section 2 ====
Round of 64

Round of 32
Marcin Olejniczak (POL)	0
Mikheil Kajaia (SRB)	9
Cho Hyo-chul (KOR)	1
Andriy Gladkykh (UKR)	4
Hamza Haloui (ALG)	3
Ondřej Dadák (CZE)	4
Pontus Lund (SWE)	8
Vilius Laurinaitis (LTU)	5

Round of 16
Mikheil Kajaia (SRB)	3
Andriy Gladkykh (UKR)	0
Ondřej Dadák (CZE)	3
Pontus Lund (SWE)	1

Quarterfinals
Mikheil Kajaia (SRB)	5
Ondřej Dadák (CZE)	1

=== Bottom half ===
==== Section 3 ====
Round of 64

Round of 32
Luillys Pérez (VEN)	14
Elias Kuosmanen (FIN)	5
Peter Öhler (GER)	6
G'Angelo Hancock (USA)	3
Beksultan Makhmudov (KGZ)	1
Musa Evloev (RUS)	4
Süleyman Demirci (TUR)	1
Mehdi Aliyari (IRI)	4

Round of 16
Luillys Pérez (VEN)	9
Peter Öhler (GER)	0
Musa Evloev (RUS)	4
Mehdi Aliyari (IRI)	1

Quarterfinals
Luillys Pérez (VEN)	0
Musa Evloev (RUS)	3

==== Section 4 ====
Round of 64
Revaz Nadareishvili (GEO)	9
Thomas Barreiro (CAN)	0
Mélonin Noumonvi (FRA)	5
Alimkhan Syzdykov (KAZ)	1

Round of 32
Nikoloz Kakhelashvili (ITA)	1
Artur Aleksanyan (ARM)	5
Felix Baldauf (NOR)	3
Daniel Gastl (AUT)	1
Aliaksandr Hrabovik (BLR)	1
Revaz Nadareishvili (GEO)	5
Mélonin Noumonvi (FRA)	4
Orkhan Nuriyev (AZE)	0

Round of 16
Artur Aleksanyan (ARM)	10
Felix Baldauf (NOR)	6
Revaz Nadareishvili (GEO)	5
Mélonin Noumonvi (FRA)	1

Quarterfinals
Artur Aleksanyan (ARM)	4
Revaz Nadareishvili (GEO)	3

=== Repechage ===
Repechage round 2
Tamás Soós (SVK)	0
Balázs Kiss (HUN)	9
Beksultan Makhmudov (KGZ)	0
Mehdi Aliyari (IRI)	9

Repechage round 3
Balázs Kiss (HUN)	4
Laokratis Kesidis (GRE)	1
Mehdi Aliyari (IRI)	8
Luillys Pérez (VEN)	0

Bronze medals
Balázs Kiss (HUN)	4
Mikheil Kajaia (SRB)	4
Mehdi Aliyari (IRI)	WO
Artur Aleksanyan (ARM)
