= 2018 European Wrestling Championships – Men's Greco-Roman 97 kg =

The Men's Greco-Roman 97 kg is a competition featured at the 2018 European Wrestling Championships, and was held in Kaspiysk, Russia on May 1 and May 2.

== Medalists ==
Gold	Artur Aleksanyan; Armenia
Silver	Mikheil Kajaia; Serbia
Bronze	Elias Kuosmanen; Finland
Bronze	Balázs Kiss; Hungary

== Results ==
Legend

- F — Won by fall

=== Final ===
Final
Artur Aleksanyan (ARM)	7
Mikheil Kajaia (SRB)	0

=== Top half ===
Round of 32

Round of 16
Elias Kuosmanen (FIN)	5
Musa Evloev (RUS)	3
Carl Persson (SWE)	1
Mélonin Noumonvi (FRA)	1
Robert Avanesyan (ISR)	0
Artur Aleksanyan (ARM)	9
Laokratis Kesidis (GRE)	8
Marcel Kasperek (POL)	0

Quarterfinals
Elias Kuosmanen (FIN)	5
Carl Persson (SWE)	0
Artur Aleksanyan (ARM)	8
Laokratis Kesidis (GRE)	0

Semifinals
Elias Kuosmanen (FIN)	0
Artur Aleksanyan (ARM)	10

=== Bottom half ===
Round of 32
Daniel Gastl (AUT)	3
Cenk İldem (TUR)	3
Tamás Soós (SVK)	0
Orkhan Nuriyev (AZE)	8
Nikolay Bayryakov (BUL)	1
Mikheil Kajaia (SRB)	3
Mathias Bak (DEN)	6
Vilius Laurinaitis (LTU)	5
Balázs Kiss (HUN)	6
Siarhei Staradub (BLR)	0

Round of 16
Iurii Shkriuba (UKR)	0
Ramsin Azizsir (GER)	3
Kukuri Kirtskhalia (GEO)	3
Cenk İldem (TUR)	5
Orkhan Nuriyev (AZE)	1
Mikheil Kajaia (SRB)	3
Mathias Bak (DEN)	1
Balázs Kiss (HUN)	5

Quarterfinals
Ramsin Azizsir (GER)	4
Cenk İldem (TUR)	1
Mikheil Kajaia (SRB)	7
Balázs Kiss (HUN)	3

Semifinals
Ramsin Azizsir (GER)	1
Mikheil Kajaia (SRB)	3

=== Repechage ===
Repechage round 1
Nikolay Bayryakov (BUL)	1
Orkhan Nuriyev (AZE)	3

Repechage round 2
Robert Avanesyan (ISR)	1
Laokratis Kesidis (GRE)	10
Orkhan Nuriyev (AZE)	1
Balázs Kiss (HUN)	2

Bronze medals
Laokratis Kesidis (GRE)	7
Elias Kuosmanen (FIN)	10
Balázs Kiss (HUN)	4
Ramsin Azizsir (GER)	1
