= Norikatsu Saikawa =

Japanese Greco-Roman wrestler

Personal information
- Nationality: Japan
- Born: 11 March 1986 (age 40) Sano, Tochigi, Japan
- Height: 1.86 m (6 ft 1 in)
- Weight: 96 kg (212 lb)

Sport
- Sport: Wrestling
- Event: Greco-Roman
- Club: Ryomo Yakult
- Coached by: Shingo Matsumoto
Medal record
Men's Greco-Roman wrestling
Representing Japan
Asian Games
Bronze medal – third place	2014 Incheon	98 kg
Asian Championships
Bronze medal – third place	2015 Doha	98 kg
Silver medal – second place	2010 Delhi	84 kg

Norikatsu Saikawa (斎川 哲克, Saikawa Norikatsu; born March 11, 1986 in Sano, Tochigi) is an amateur Japanese Greco-Roman wrestler, who competed in the men's heavyweight category. He won a silver medal for the 84 kg division at the 2010 Asian Wrestling Championships in Delhi, India, losing out to South Korea's Lee Se-Yeol. Saikawa is also a member of Ryomo Yakult Wrestling Club, and is coached and trained by former Asian Games light heavyweight champion and two-time Olympian Shingo Matsumoto.

Saikawa represented Japan at the 2012 Summer Olympics in London, where he competed for the men's 96 kg class. He received a bye for the preliminary round of sixteen match, before losing out to Sweden's Jimmy Lidberg, who was able to score three points in two straight periods, leaving Saikawa without a single point.
