= 2022 European Wrestling Championships – Men's Greco-Roman 97 kg =

Wrestling competition

Men's Greco-Roman 97 kg at the 2022 European Wrestling Championships
- Venue: BOK Sports Hall
- Location: Budapest, Hungary
- Dates: 2-3 April
- Competitors: 18

Medalists
| gold medal | Kiril Milov | Bulgaria |
| silver medal | Arvi Savolainen | Finland |
| bronze medal | Daniel Gastl | Austria |
| bronze medal | Vladlen Kozlyuk | Ukraine |

The Men's Greco-Roman 97 kg is a competition featured at the 2022 European Wrestling Championships, and was held in Budapest, Hungary on April 2 and 3.

== Results ==
Legend

- F — Won by fall
- R — Retired

=== Final ===
| Final |
| Arvi Savolainen (FIN) | 1 |
| Kiril Milov (BUL) | 4 |

=== Top half ===
Round of 32
Revazi Nadareishvili (GEO) | 1
Aleksandar Stjepanetic (SWE) | 1

Round of 16
Arvi Savolainen (FIN) | 7
Murat Lokyaev (AZE) | 1
Aleksandar Stjepanetic (SWE) | 1
Laokratis Kesidis (GRE) | 4^{F}
Ramsin Azizsir (GER) | 1
Daniel Gastl (AUT) | 1
Artur Omarov (CZE) | 4
Vilius Laurinaitis (LTU) | 3

Quarterfinals
Arvi Savolainen (FIN) | 9
Laokratis Kesidis (GRE) | 0
Daniel Gastl (AUT) | 7
Artur Omarov (CZE) | 2

Semifinals
Arvi Savolainen (FIN) | 4
Daniel Gastl (AUT) | 2

=== Bottom half ===
Round of 32
Michał Dybka (POL) | 4
Mikheil Kajaia (SRB) | 5

Round of 16
Nikoloz Kakhelashvili (ITA) | 1
Beytullah Kayışdağ (TUR) | 6
Tyrone Sterkenburg (NED) | 2
Vladlen Kozlyuk (UKR) | 7^{F}
Felix Baldauf (NOR) | 4
Mikheil Kajaia (SRB) | 0
Róbert Érsek (HUN) | 1
Kiril Milov (BUL) | 10

Quarterfinals
Beytullah Kayışdağ (TUR) | 4
Vladlen Kozlyuk (UKR) | 8
Felix Baldauf (NOR) | 1^{R}
Kiril Milov (BUL) | 2

Semifinals
Vladlen Kozlyuk (UKR) | 1
Kiril Milov (BUL) | 7

=== Repechage ===
Repechage round 1
Murat Lokyaev (AZE) | 11
Laokratis Kesidis (GRE) | 1
Róbert Érsek (HUN) | 1
Felix Baldauf (NOR) | 3

Bronze medal match
Murat Lokyaev (AZE) | 1
Daniel Gastl (AUT) | 4
Felix Baldauf (NOR) | 0
Vladlen Kozlyuk (UKR) | 8

== Final standing ==
| Rank | Athlete | UWW Points |
|---|---|---|
| 1st place, gold medalist(s) | Kiril Milov (BUL) | 15000 |
| 2nd place, silver medalist(s) | Arvi Savolainen (FIN) | 13000 |
| 3rd place, bronze medalist(s) | Daniel Gastl (AUT) | 11500 |
| 3rd place, bronze medalist(s) | Vladlen Kozlyuk (UKR) | 11500 |
| 5 | Murat Lokyaev (AZE) | 10000 |
| 5 | Felix Baldauf (NOR) | 10000 |
| 7 | Laokratis Kesidis (GRE) | 9400 |
| 8 | Beytullah Kayışdağ (TUR) | 9000 |
| 9 | Artur Omarov (CZE) | 8500 |
| 10 | Mikheil Kajaia (SRB) | 8100 |
| 11 | Aleksandar Stjepanetic (SWE) | 6000 |
| 12 | Róbert Érsek (HUN) | 5800 |
| 13 | Michał Dybka (POL) | 5600 |
| 14 | Vilius Laurinaitis (LTU) | 5400 |
| 15 | Revazi Nadareishvili (GEO) | 5200 |
| 16 | Ramsin Azizsir (GER) | 5100 |
| 17 | Nikoloz Kakhelashvili (ITA) | 0 |
| 18 | Tyrone Sterkenburg (NED) | 0 |
