= 2009 World Wrestling Championships – Men's Greco-Roman 96 kg =

Men's Greco-Roman 96 kg at the 2009 World Championships
- Venue: Messecenter Herning
- Dates: 26 September 2009
- Competitors: 34 from 34 nations

Medalists
gold medal	Balázs Kiss	Hungary
silver medal	Jimmy Lidberg	Sweden
bronze medal	Amir Aliakbari	Iran
bronze medal	Aslanbek Khushtov	Russia

The men's Greco-Roman 96 kilograms is a competition featured at the 2009 World Wrestling Championships, and was held at the Messecenter Herning exhibition center in Herning, Denmark on September 26.

== Results ==
=== Finals ===
Semifinals				Final
Amir Aliakbari (IRI)	1	0	0
Balázs Kiss (HUN)	0	5	1	Balázs Kiss (HUN)	0	1	2
Jimmy Lidberg (SWE)	5	0	2	Jimmy Lidberg (SWE)	2	0	0
Aslanbek Khushtov (RUS)	4	3	0

=== Top half ===
==== Section 1 ====
Round of 64

Round of 32
Alin Alexuc-Ciurariu (ROU)	0	1	3
Erwin Caraballo (VEN)	1	0	0
Davi Albino (BRA)	0	0
Denis Mishin (AZE)	3	3
Jesper Viholt (DEN)	0	0
Amir Aliakbari (IRI)	5	4
Yasmany Lugo (CUB)	0	0
Kaloyan Dinchev (BUL)	1	2

Round of 16
Alin Alexuc-Ciurariu (ROU)	0	1	1
Denis Mishin (AZE)	1	0	0
Amir Aliakbari (IRI)	3	3
Kaloyan Dinchev (BUL)	0	0

Quarterfinals
Alin Alexuc-Ciurariu (ROU)	0	0
Amir Aliakbari (IRI)	2	1

==== Section 2 ====
Round of 64

Round of 32
Heiki Nabi (EST)	0	3	2
Katsuya Kitamura (JPN)	1	0	0
Balázs Kiss (HUN)	1	2	4
Oliver Hassler (GER)	0	4	0
Theodoros Tounousidis (GRE)	2	1
Arman Geghamyan (ARM)	0	0
Davyd Saldadze (UZB)	0	1	4
Tsimafei Dzeinichenka (BLR)	1	0	2

Round of 16
Heiki Nabi (EST)	0	1	0
Balázs Kiss (HUN)	1	0	1
Theodoros Tounousidis (GRE)	2	0	0
Davyd Saldadze (UZB)	0	3	1

Quarterfinals
Balázs Kiss (HUN)	4	2
Davyd Saldadze (UZB)	0	0

=== Bottom half ===
==== Section 3 ====
Round of 64

Round of 32
An Chang-gun (KOR)	0	3	4
Marcin Olejniczak (POL)	1	0	0
Yahia Abutabeekh (JOR)	0	1	1
Anil Kumar (IND)	1	0	0
Jimmy Lidberg (SWE)	2	1
Daigoro Timoncini (ITA)	1	0
Sergiy Yeroshkin (UKR)	1	1
Filip Köszeghy (SVK)	0	0

Round of 16
An Chang-gun (KOR)	0	1	1
Yahia Abutabeekh (JOR)	1	0	0
Jimmy Lidberg (SWE)	2	1
Sergiy Yeroshkin (UKR)	2	0

Quarterfinals
An Chang-gun (KOR)	0	0
Jimmy Lidberg (SWE)	1	2

==== Section 4 ====
Round of 64
Ren Li (CHN)	0	0
Rami Hietaniemi (FIN)	1	6
Serkan Özden (TUR)	2	3
R. C. Johnson (USA)	0	1

Round of 32
Vladimir Radosavljević (MNE)	1	0
Ramaz Nozadze (GEO)	5	1
David Vála (CZE)	0	0
Aslanbek Khushtov (RUS)	1	3
Margulan Assembekov (KAZ)	3	1	1
Anatol Moldovan (MDA)	0	2	0
Rami Hietaniemi (FIN)	0	0
Serkan Özden (TUR)	1	3

Round of 16
Ramaz Nozadze (GEO)	0	1	0
Aslanbek Khushtov (RUS)	3	0	3
Margulan Assembekov (KAZ)	0	0
Serkan Özden (TUR)	1	2

Quarterfinals
Aslanbek Khushtov (RUS)	3	1
Serkan Özden (TUR)	0	0

=== Repechage ===
Repechage round 2
Oliver Hassler (GER)	2	4
Heiki Nabi (EST)	0	1
Daigoro Timoncini (ITA)	0	0
Sergiy Yeroshkin (UKR)	1	2

Repechage round 3
Oliver Hassler (GER)	0	1
Davyd Saldadze (UZB)	1	2
Sergiy Yeroshkin (UKR)	1	1
An Chang-gun (KOR)	0	0

Bronze medals
Davyd Saldadze (UZB)	0	2
Amir Aliakbari (IRI)	1	2
Sergiy Yeroshkin (UKR)	0	0
Aslanbek Khushtov (RUS)	1	5
