= Wrestling at the 2019 Pan American Games – Men's Greco-Roman 97 kg =

Men's Greco-Roman 97 kg at the 2019 Pan American Games
- Venue: Miguel Grau Coliseum
- Dates: August 7
- Competitors: 8 from 8 nations

Medalists
Gold medal	Gabriel Rosillo	Cuba
Silver medal	G'Angelo Hancock	United States
Bronze medal	Kevin Mejía	Honduras
Bronze medal	Luillys Pérez	Venezuela

The Men's Greco-Roman 97 kg competition of the Wrestling events at the 2019 Pan American Games in Lima was held on August 7 at the Miguel Grau Coliseum.

== Results ==
All times are local (UTC−5)

Legend

- F — Won by fall

=== Final ===
Quarterfinals		Semifinals		Finals
G'Angelo Hancock (USA)	9
Thomas Barreiro (CAN)	0	G'Angelo Hancock (USA)	10
Óscar Loango (COL)	0	Kevin Mejía (HON)	0
Kevin Mejía (HON)	7			G'Angelo Hancock (USA)	2
José Antonio Arias (DOM)	4^{F}			Gabriel Rosillo (CUB)	7
Bryan Cruz (PER)	2	José Antonio Arias (DOM)	0
Gabriel Rosillo (CUB)	9	Gabriel Rosillo (CUB)	8
Luillys Pérez (VEN)	0

=== Repechage ===
Bronze medal match
Thomas Barreiro (CAN)	0
Kevin Mejía (HON)	8
Luillys Pérez (VEN)	9
José Antonio Arias (DOM)	0
