= 2023 European Wrestling Championships – Men's Greco-Roman 97 kg =

Wrestling competition

Men's Greco-Roman 97 kg at the 2023 European Wrestling Championships
- Venue: Arena Zagreb
- Location: Zagreb, Croatia
- Dates: 22-23 April
- Competitors: 20

Medalists
gold medal	Artur Aleksanyan	Armenia
silver medal	Kiril Milov	Bulgaria
bronze medal	Mikheil Kajaia	Serbia
bronze medal	Artur Omarov	Czech Republic

The Men's Greco-Roman 97 kg was a competition featured at the 2023 European Wrestling Championships, held in Zagreb, Croatia on April 22 and 23.

== Results ==
Legend

- F — Won by fall

=== Final ===
Final
Kiril Milov (BUL)	1
Artur Aleksanyan (ARM)	5

=== Top half ===
Round of 32
Peter Öhler (GER)	1
Mikheil Kajaia (SRB)	3
Felix Baldauf (NOR)	3
Tyrone Sterkenburg (NED)	10

Round of 16
Kiril Milov (BUL)	8
Richard Karelson (EST)	0
Mikheil Kajaia (SRB)	3
Aleksandar Stjepanetic (SWE)	1
Mindaugas Venckaitis (LTU)	3
Tyrone Sterkenburg (NED)	3
Filip Smetko (CRO)	1
Nikoloz Kakhelashvili (ITA)	3

Quarterfinals
Kiril Milov (BUL)	8
Mikheil Kajaia (SRB)	0
Tyrone Sterkenburg (NED)	1
Nikoloz Kakhelashvili (ITA)	1

Semifinals
Kiril Milov (BUL)	7
Nikoloz Kakhelashvili (ITA)	0

=== Bottom half ===
Round of 32
Vladen Kozliuk (UKR)	5
Markus Ragginger (AUT)	1
Laokratis Kesidis (GRE)	9
Gerard Kurniczak (POL)	1

Round of 16
Arif Niftullayev (AZE)	1
Artur Omarov (CZE)	2
Vladen Kozliuk (UKR)	7
Metehan Başar (TUR)	1
Tamás Lévai (HUN)	8
Laokratis Kesidis (GRE)	0
Robert Kobliashvili (GEO)	1
Artur Aleksanyan (ARM)	3

Quarterfinals
Artur Omarov (CZE)	3
Vladen Kozliuk (UKR)	1
Tamás Lévai (HUN)	4
Artur Aleksanyan (ARM)	7

Semifinals
Artur Omarov (CZE)	0
Artur Aleksanyan (ARM)	9

Repechage round 1
Richard Karelson (EST)	1
Mikheil Kajaia (SRB)	5
Robert Kobliashvili (GEO)	3
Tamás Lévai (HUN)	1

Bronze medal match
Mikheil Kajaia (SRB)	1
Nikoloz Kakhelashvili (ITA)	1
Robert Kobliashvili (GEO)	1
Artur Omarov (CZE)	1

== Final standing ==
Rank	Athlete
1st place, gold medalist(s)	Artur Aleksanyan (ARM)
2nd place, silver medalist(s)	Kiril Milov (BUL)
3rd place, bronze medalist(s)	Mikheil Kajaia (SRB)
3rd place, bronze medalist(s)	Artur Omarov (CZE)
5	Nikoloz Kakhelashvili (ITA)
5	Robert Kobliashvili (GEO)
7	Tyrone Sterkenburg (NED)
8	Vladen Kozliuk (UKR)
9	Tamás Lévai (HUN)
10	Laokratis Kesidis (GRE)
11	Mindaugas Venckaitis (LTU)
12	Felix Baldauf (NOR)
13	Arif Niftullayev (AZE)
14	Peter Öhler (GER)
15	Aleksandar Stjepanetic (SWE)
16	Filip Smetko (CRO)
17	Markus Ragginger (AUT)
18	Metehan Başar (TUR)
19	Gerard Kurniczak (POL)
20	Richard Karelson (EST)
