= Wrestling at the 2014 Asian Games – Men's Greco-Roman 98 kg =

Men's Greco-Roman 98 kg at the 2014 Asian Games
- Venue: Dowon Gymnasium
- Date: 30 September 2014
- Competitors: 9 from 9 nations

Medalists
gold medal	Mehdi Aliyari	Iran
silver medal	Xiao Di	China
bronze medal	Yerulan Iskakov	Kazakhstan
bronze medal	Norikatsu Saikawa	Japan

The men's Greco-Roman 98 kilograms wrestling competition at the 2014 Asian Games in Incheon was held on 30 September 2014 at the Dowon Gymnasium.

This wrestling competition consisted of a single-elimination tournament, with a repechage used to determine the winner of two bronze medals. The two finalists faced off for gold and silver medals. Each wrestler who lost to one of the two finalists moved into the repechage.

== Schedule ==
All times are Korea Standard Time (UTC+09:00)

Date	Time	Event
Tuesday, 30 September 2014	13:00	1/8 finals
Tuesday, 30 September 2014	13:00	Quarterfinals
Tuesday, 30 September 2014	13:00	Semifinals
Tuesday, 30 September 2014	13:00	Repechages
Tuesday, 30 September 2014	19:00	Finals

== Results ==
=== Main bracket ===
1/8 finals
Yahia Abutabeekh (JOR)	0
Xiao Di (CHN)	10

Quarterfinals
Gu Hak-bon (KOR)	0
Yerulan Iskakov (KAZ)	2
Naouzat Saleh (SYR)	0
Mehdi Aliyari (IRI)	9
Khabibullo Abdulloev (TJK)	4
Arslan Saparmämmedow (TKM)	7
Norikatsu Saikawa (JPN)	3
Xiao Di (CHN)	3

Semifinals
Yerulan Iskakov (KAZ)	1
Mehdi Aliyari (IRI)	3
Arslan Saparmämmedow (TKM)	0
Xiao Di (CHN)	2

Gold medal
Mehdi Aliyari (IRI)	8
Xiao Di (CHN)	0

=== Repechage ===
Repechage
Yahia Abutabeekh (JOR)	0
Norikatsu Saikawa (JPN)	10

Bronze medals
Naouzat Saleh (SYR)	0
Yerulan Iskakov (KAZ)	9
Norikatsu Saikawa (JPN)	8
Arslan Saparmämmedow (TKM)	0

== Final standing ==
Rank	Athlete
1st place, gold medalist(s)	Mehdi Aliyari (IRI)
2nd place, silver medalist(s)	Xiao Di (CHN)
3rd place, bronze medalist(s)	Yerulan Iskakov (KAZ)
3rd place, bronze medalist(s)	Norikatsu Saikawa (JPN)
5	Naouzat Saleh (SYR)
5	Arslan Saparmämmedow (TKM)
7	Khabibullo Abdulloev (TJK)
8	Gu Hak-bon (KOR)
9	Yahia Abutabeekh (JOR)
