= Kiril Milov =

Bulgarian Greco-Roman wrestler

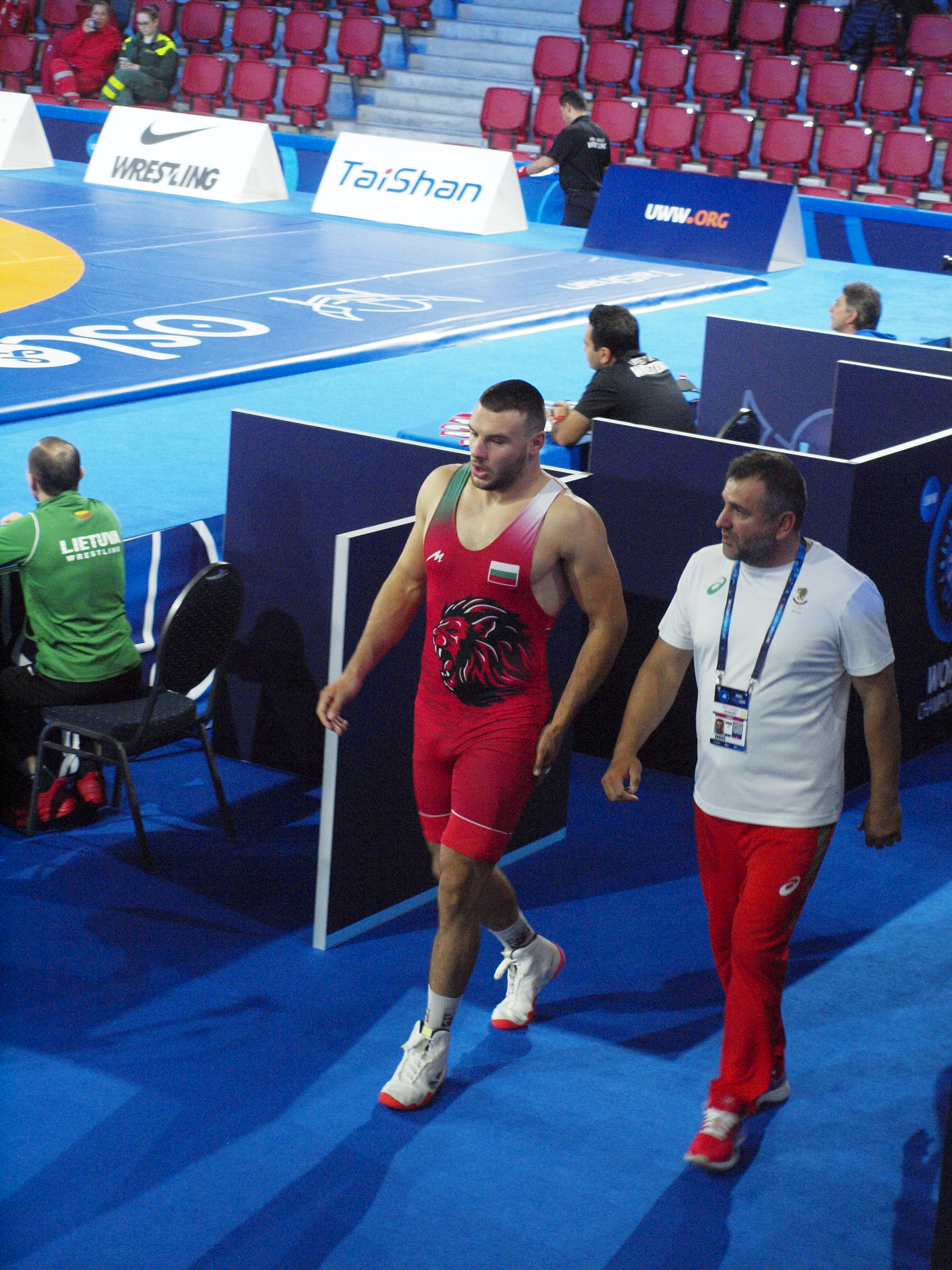
- Milov at the 2021 World Wrestling Championships in Oslo, Norway

Personal information
- Native name: Кирил Миленов Милов
- Full name: Kiril Milenov Milov
- Born: 27 January 1997 (age 29) Dupnitsa, Bulgaria

Sport
- Country: Bulgaria
- Sport: Amateur wrestling
- Weight class: 97 kg
- Event: Greco-Roman
- Club: CSKA Sofia
Medal record
Men's Greco-Roman wrestling
Representing Bulgaria
World Championships
Silver medal – second place	2018 Budapest	97 kg
Silver medal – second place	2022 Belgrade	97 kg
Bronze medal – third place	2026 Astana	97 kg
European Championships
Gold medal – first place	2022 Budapest	97 kg
Gold medal – first place	2025 Bratislava	97 kg
Silver medal – second place	2019 Bucharest	97 kg
Silver medal – second place	2023 Zagreb	97 kg
Bronze medal – third place	2024 Bucharest	97 kg
Summer Youth Olympics
Silver medal – second place	2014 Nanjing	85 kg

Kiril Milenov Milov (Bulgarian: Кирил Миленов Милов; born 27 January 1997) is a Bulgarian Greco-Roman wrestler. He is a two-time silver medalist in the men's 97 kg event at the World Wrestling Championships (2018 and 2022). He represented Bulgaria at the 2020 Summer Olympics in Tokyo, Japan and the 2024 Summer Olympics in Paris, France.

== Career ==
At the 2014 Summer Youth Olympics held in Nanjing, China, Milov won the silver medal in the 85 kg event.

Milov won the silver medal in the 97 kg event at the 2018 World Wrestling Championships held in Budapest, Hungary. In 2019, he won the silver medal in the 97 kg event at the European Wrestling Championships held in Bucharest, Romania. In the final, he lost against Musa Evloev of Russia.

In March 2021, Milov qualified at the European Qualification Tournament to compete at the 2020 Summer Olympics in Tokyo, Japan. In April 2021, he competed in the 97 kg event at the European Wrestling Championships held in Warsaw, Poland.

Milov competed in the 97 kg event at the 2020 Summer Olympics held in Tokyo, Japan. He won his first match against Cenk İldem of Turkey and he was then eliminated in his next match by eventual bronze medalist Mohammad Hadi Saravi of Iran.

Milov won the gold medal in the 97 kg event at the 2022 European Wrestling Championships held in Budapest, Hungary. In the final, he defeated Arvi Savolainen of Finland. He won the silver medal in the 97 kg event at the 2022 World Wrestling Championships held in Belgrade, Serbia.

Milov won one of the bronze medals in the 97 kg event at the 2024 European Wrestling Championships held in Bucharest, Romania. He competed in the 130 kg event at the 2024 Summer Olympics in Paris, France.

Milov is a fan of extreme sports.

== Achievements ==
Year	Tournament	Location	Result	Event
2018	World Championships	Budapest, Hungary	2nd	Greco-Roman 97 kg
2019	European Championships	Bucharest, Romania	2nd	Greco-Roman 97 kg
2022	European Championships	Budapest, Hungary	1st	Greco-Roman 97 kg
2022	World Championships	Belgrade, Serbia	2nd	Greco-Roman 97 kg
2023	European Championships	Zagreb, Croatia	2nd	Greco-Roman 97 kg
2024	European Championships	Bucharest, Romania	3rd	Greco-Roman 97 kg
2025	European Championships	Bratislava, Slovakia	1st	Greco-Roman 97 kg
