= Wrestling at the 2020 Summer Olympics – Men's Greco-Roman 97 kg =

Men's Greco-Roman 97 kg at the Games of the XXXII Olympiad
- Venue: Makuhari Messe
- Date: 2–3 August 2021
- Competitors: 16 from 16 nations

Medalists
1st place, gold medalist(s)		Musa Evloev	ROC
2nd place, silver medalist(s)		Artur Aleksanyan	Armenia
3rd place, bronze medalist(s)		Tadeusz Michalik	Poland
3rd place, bronze medalist(s)		Mohammad Hadi Saravi	Iran

The men's Greco-Roman 97 kilograms competition at the 2020 Summer Olympics in Tokyo, Japan, took place on 2–3 August 2021 at the Makuhari Messe in Mihama-ku.

This freestyle wrestling competition consists of a single-elimination tournament, with a repechage used to determine the winner of two bronze medals. The two finalists face off for gold and silver medals. Each wrestler who loses to one of the two finalists moves into the repechage, culminating in a pair of bronze medal matches featuring the semifinal losers each facing the remaining repechage opponent from their half of the bracket.

== Schedule ==
All times are Japan Standard Time (UTC+09:00)

Date	Time	Event
2 August 2021	11:00	Qualification rounds
2 August 2021	18:15	Semifinals
3 August 2021	11:00	Repechage
3 August 2021	19:30	Finals

== Results ==
=== Main bracket ===
1/8 finals
Musa Evloev (ROC)	3
Giorgi Melia (GEO)	1
Alex Szőke (HUN)	3
Artur Omarov (CZE)	1
Mikheil Kajaia (SRB)	1
G'Angelo Hancock (USA)	5
Haykel Achouri (TUN)	0
Tadeusz Michalik (POL)	10
Mohammad Hadi Saravi (IRI)	9
Adem Boudjemline (ALG)	0
Kiril Milov (BUL)	3
Cenk İldem (TUR)	1
Gabriel Rosillo (CUB)	1
Arvi Savolainen (FIN)	3
Uzur Dzhuzupbekov (KGZ)	1
Artur Aleksanyan (ARM)	4

1/4 finals
Musa Evloev (ROC)	6
Alex Szőke (HUN)	2
G'Angelo Hancock (USA)	3
Tadeusz Michalik (POL)	4
Mohammad Hadi Saravi (IRI)	6
Kiril Milov (BUL)	0
Arvi Savolainen (FIN)	1
Artur Aleksanyan (ARM)	5

Semifinals
Musa Evloev (ROC)	7
Tadeusz Michalik (POL)	1
Mohammad Hadi Saravi (IRI)	1
Artur Aleksanyan (ARM)	4

Final
Musa Evloev (ROC)	5
Artur Aleksanyan (ARM)	1

=== Repechage ===
Repechage
Giorgi Melia (GEO)	1
Alex Szőke (HUN)	5
Uzur Dzhuzupbekov (KGZ)	1
Arvi Savolainen (FIN)	4

Bronze medal matches
Alex Szőke (HUN)	0
Tadeusz Michalik (POL)	10
Arvi Savolainen (FIN)	2
Mohammad Hadi Saravi (IRI)	9

== Final standing ==
Rank	Athlete
1st place, gold medalist(s)	Musa Evloev (ROC)
2nd place, silver medalist(s)	Artur Aleksanyan (ARM)
3rd place, bronze medalist(s)	Tadeusz Michalik (POL)
3rd place, bronze medalist(s)	Mohammad Hadi Saravi (IRI)
5	Alex Szőke (HUN)
5	Arvi Savolainen (FIN)
7	G'Angelo Hancock (USA)
8	Kiril Milov (BUL)
9	Giorgi Melia (GEO)
10	Uzur Dzhuzupbekov (KGZ)
11	Artur Omarov (CZE)
12	Cenk İldem (TUR)
13	Gabriel Rosillo (CUB)
14	Mikheil Kajaia (SRB)
15	Adem Boudjemline (ALG)
16	Haykel Achouri (TUN)
