= Mehdi Aliyari =

Iranian Greco-Roman wrestler

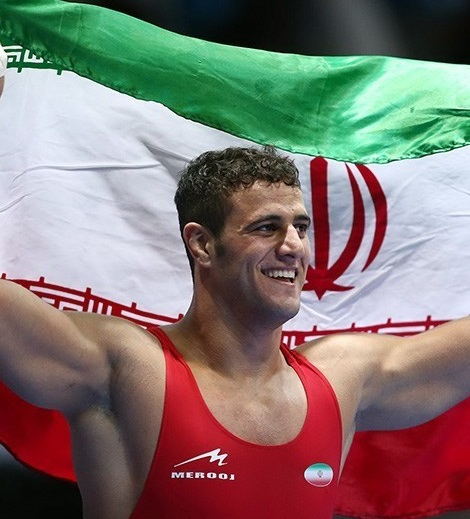

Personal information
- Full name: Mehdi Aliyari Feizabadi
- Nationality: Iran
- Born: March 13, 1989 (age 37) Iran
- Height: 1.92 m (6 ft 4 in)
- Weight: 98 kg (216 lb)

Sport
- Country: Iran
- Sport: Men's Greco-Roman wrestling
- Coached by: Nasser Nourbakhsh
Medal record
Representing Iran
Men's Greco-Roman wrestling
World Championships
Bronze medal – third place	2018 Budapest	97 kg
Asian Games
Gold medal – first place	2014 Incheon	98 kg
Asian Championships
Gold medal – first place	2015 Doha	98 kg
Gold medal – first place	2016 Bangkok	98 kg
Bronze medal – third place	2019 Xi'an	97 kg
Summer Universiade
Bronze medal – third place	2013 Kazan	96 kg

Mehdi Aliyari (Persian: مهدی علی‌یاری, born 13 March 1989) is an Iranian Greco-Roman wrestler.
