= 2019 European Wrestling Championships – Men's Greco-Roman 87 kg =

The Men's Greco-Roman 87 kg is a competition featured at the 2019 European Wrestling Championships, and was held in Bucharest, Romania on April 12 and April 13.

== Medalists ==
Gold	Zhan Beleniuk; Ukraine
Silver	Islam Abbasov; Azerbaijan
Bronze	Erik Szilvássy; Hungary
Bronze	Denis Kudla; Germany

== Results ==
Legend

- F — Won by fall

=== Final ===
Final
Zhan Beleniuk (UKR)	5
Islam Abbasov (AZE)	1

=== Top half ===
Round of 32
Robert Kobliashvili (GEO)	3
Tadeusz Michalik (POL)	4

Round of 16
Yoan Dimitrov (BUL)	3
Erik Szilvássy (HUN)	6
Zhan Beleniuk (UKR)	6
Ivan Huklek (CRO)	1
Amer Hrustanović (AUT)	1
Eividas Stankevičius (LTU)	1
Nikolaj Dobrev (SRB)	5
Tadeusz Michalik (POL)	1

Quarterfinals
Erik Szilvássy (HUN)	1
Zhan Beleniuk (UKR)	3
Eividas Stankevičius (LTU)	12^{F}
Nikolaj Dobrev (SRB)	4

Semifinals
Zhan Beleniuk (UKR)	5
Eividas Stankevičius (LTU)	1

=== Bottom half ===
Round of 32
Maksim Manukyan (ARM)	5^{F}
Toni Metsomäki (FIN)	0
Ionuţ Caraş (ROU)	9
Erik Int (EST)	0
Davit Chakvetadze (RUS)	9
Zakarias Berg (SWE)	2
Islam Abbasov (AZE)	1
Denis Kudla (GER)	1
Viorel Burduja (MDA)	10
Ondřej Dadák (CZE)	1
Pedro Jacinto García (ESP)	0
Ramon Betschart (SUI)	8
Dimitrios Tsekeridis (GRE)	4
Metehan Başar (TUR)	5
Fabio Parisi (ITA)	2
Mikalai Stadub (BLR)	4

Round of 16
Maksim Manukyan (ARM)	8
Ionuţ Caraş (ROU)	0
Davit Chakvetadze (RUS)	1
Islam Abbasov (AZE)	2
Viorel Burduja (MDA)	2
Ramon Betschart (SUI)	5
Metehan Başar (TUR)	3
Mikalai Stadub (BLR)	7

Quarterfinals
Maksim Manukyan (ARM)	1
Islam Abbasov (AZE)	6
Ramon Betschart (SUI)	2
Mikalai Stadub (BLR)	5

Semifinals
Islam Abbasov (AZE)	4
Mikalai Stadub (BLR)	0

=== Repechage ===
Repechage round 1
Denis Kudla (GER)	3
Davit Chakvetadze (RUS)	3

Repechage round 2
Ivan Huklek (CRO)	3
Erik Szilvássy (HUN)	4
Denis Kudla (GER)	6^{F}
Maksim Manukyan (ARM)	3

Bronze medal match
Erik Szilvássy (HUN)	2
Eividas Stankevičius (LTU)	1
Denis Kudla (GER)	3
Mikalai Stadub (BLR)	1
