= Richard Karelson =

Estonian wrestler (born 1977)

Richard Karelson (born 1 August 1977) is an Estonian wrestler.

He was born in Tapa. In 2009 he graduated from the Estonian Military Academy.

He began his wrestling career in 1985. He has participated in the World Wrestling Championships, with an 11th best place in 2002. He has been an Estonian champion eleven times.

His son Richard is also a wrestler.
