= Sargis Tonoyan =

Armenian Greco-Roman wrestler

Personal information
- Born: 12 January 1988 (age 38) Gyumri, Armenia
- Height: 1.80 m (5 ft 11 in)
- Weight: 96 kg (212 lb)

Sport
- Sport: Wrestling
- Event: Greco-Roman
- Club: Musherian Yerevan
- Coached by: Gagik Khachtaryan
Medal record
Representing Armenia
Men's Greco-Roman wrestling
World Cup
| Gold medal – first place | 2013 Tehran | 96 kg |

Sargis Tonoyan (Armenian: Սարգիս Տոնոյանը; born 12 January 1988) is an Armenian Greco-Roman wrestler.

Tonoyan was a member of the Armenian Greco-Roman wrestling team at the 2010 Wrestling World Cup. The Armenian team came in third place. Tonoyan was also a member of the Armenian Greco-Roman wrestling team at the 2013 Wrestling World Cup. The Armenian team came in fourth place. Tonoyan personally won a gold medal.
