= Tanty =

Tanty Танты ТIантIи
- Selo
- Location within Republic of Dagestan Location within Russia
- Coordinates: 42°09′N 47°19′E
- Country: Russia
- Region: Republic of Dagestan
- District: Akushinsky District
- Time zone: UTC+3:00

Tanty (Russian: Танты; Dargwa: ТIантIи) is a rural locality (a selo) in Akushinsky District, Republic of Dagestan, Russia. The population was 824 as of 2010. There are 8 streets.

== Geography ==
Tanty is located 16 km south of Akusha (the district's administrative centre) by road. Urgani is the nearest rural locality.
