= Mikalai Stadub =

Belarusian Greco-Roman wrestler

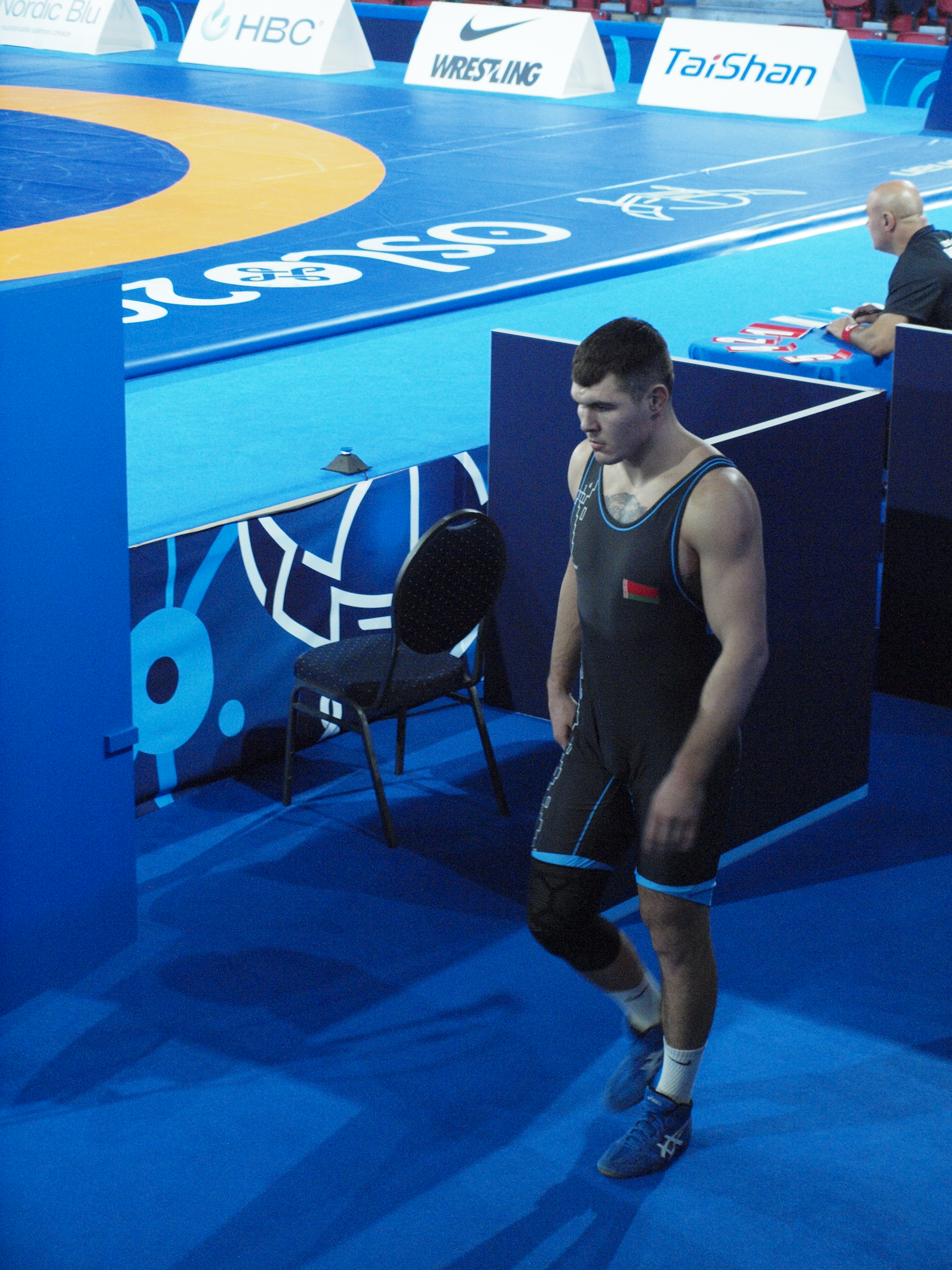
- 2021 World Wrestling Championships by Jørgen Løken

Personal information
- Native name: Мікалай Сяргеевіч Стадуб

Sport
- Country: Belarus
- Sport: Amateur wrestling
- Event: Greco-Roman
Medal record
Men's Greco-Roman wrestling
Representing Belarus
European Championships
| Bronze medal – third place | 2021 Warsaw | 97 kg |

Mikalai Siarheyevich Stadub (Belarusian: Мікалай Сяргеевіч Стадуб) is a Belarusian Greco-Roman wrestler. In 2021, he won one of the bronze medals in the 97 kg event at the 2021 European Wrestling Championships held in Warsaw, Poland.

== Career ==
In 2019, Stadub lost his bronze medal match in the 87 kg event at the European Wrestling Championships held in Bucharest, Romania. He also lost his bronze medal match in the 87 kg event at the 2019 World Wrestling Championships held in Nur-Sultan, Kazakhstan.

In that year, Stadub also competed in the 87 kg event at the 2019 Military World Games held in Wuhan, China without winning a medal.

== Achievements ==
| Year | Tournament | Venue | Result | Event |
|---|---|---|---|---|
| 2021 | European Championships | Warsaw, Poland | 3rd | Greco-Roman 97 kg |
