= Gabriel Rosillo =

Cuban Greco-Roman wrestler

Personal information
- Full name: Gabriel Alejandro Rosillo Kindelán
- Born: 4 January 1999 (age 27) Santiago de Cuba, Cuba

Sport
- Country: Cuba
- Sport: Amateur wrestling
- Weight class: 97 kg
- Event: Greco-Roman
Medal record
Men's Greco-Roman wrestling
Representing Cuba
Olympic Games
Bronze medal – third place	2024 Paris	97 kg
World Championships
Gold medal – first place	2023 Belgrade	97 kg
World Junior Championships
Gold medal – first place	2019 Estonia	97 kg
Pan American Games
Gold medal – first place	2019 Lima	97 kg
Gold medal – first place	2023 Santiago	97 kg
Pan American Championships
Gold medal – first place	2019 Buenos Aires	97 kg
Gold medal – first place	2025 Monterrey	97 kg
Gold medal – first place	2026 Coralville	97 kg
Silver medal – second place	2020 Ottawa	97 kg
Bronze medal – third place	2018 Lima	97 kg
Central American and Caribbean Games
Gold medal – first place	2023 San Salvador	97 kg
Bronze medal – third place	2026 Santo Domingo	97 kg

Gabriel Alejandro Rosillo Kindelán (Note: In this Spanish name, the first or paternal surname is Rosillo and the second or maternal family name is Kindelán.) (born 4 January 1999) is a Cuban Greco-Roman wrestler. He won one of the bronze medals in the 97 kg event at the 2024 Summer Olympics in Paris, France. He won the gold medal in the 97 kg event at the 2023 World Wrestling Championships held in Belgrade, Serbia. Rosillo also won gold in his event at the 2019 Pan American Games in Lima, Peru and the 2023 Pan American Games in Santiago, Chile.

== Career ==
In 2018, Rosillo won one of the bronze medals in the 97 kg event at the Pan American Wrestling Championships held in Lima, Peru. A year later, he went on to win the gold medal in this event.

In 2019, Rosillo won gold at the 2019 World Junior Wrestling Championships at 97 kg in Greco Roman.

In March 2020, Rosillo qualified to represent Cuba at the 2020 Summer Olympics in Tokyo, Japan at the 2020 Pan American Wrestling Olympic Qualification Tournament held in Ottawa, Canada. A week earlier, he won the silver medal in the 97 kg event at the 2020 Pan American Wrestling Championships, also held in Ottawa, Canada.

Rosillo competed in the men's 97 kg event at the 2020 Summer Olympics held in Tokyo, Japan. He was eliminated in his first match by Arvi Savolainen of Finland.

Rosillo won the gold medal in the 97 kg event at the 2023 World Wrestling Championships held in Belgrade, Serbia. He defeated Artur Aleksanyan of Armenia in his gold medal match. In 2024, Rosillo won one of the bronze medals in the 97 kg event at the Summer Olympics in Paris, France. He defeated Rustam Assakalov of Uzbekistan in his bronze medal match.

== Achievements ==
Year	Tournament	Location	Result	Event
2018	Pan American Wrestling Championships	Lima, Peru	3rd	Greco-Roman 97 kg
2019	Pan American Wrestling Championships	Buenos Aires, Argentina	1st	Greco-Roman 97 kg
2019	Pan American Games	Lima, Peru	1st	Greco-Roman 97 kg
2020	Pan American Wrestling Championships	Ottawa, Canada	2nd	Greco-Roman 97 kg
2023	World Championships	Belgrade, Serbia	1st	Greco-Roman 97 kg
2023	Pan American Games	Santiago, Chile	1st	Greco-Roman 97 kg
2024	Olympic Games	Paris, France	3rd	Greco-Roman 97 kg
2025	Pan American Wrestling Championships	Monterrey, Mexico	1st	Greco-Roman 97 kg
