= Artur Omarov =

Czech Greco-Roman wrestler (born 1988)

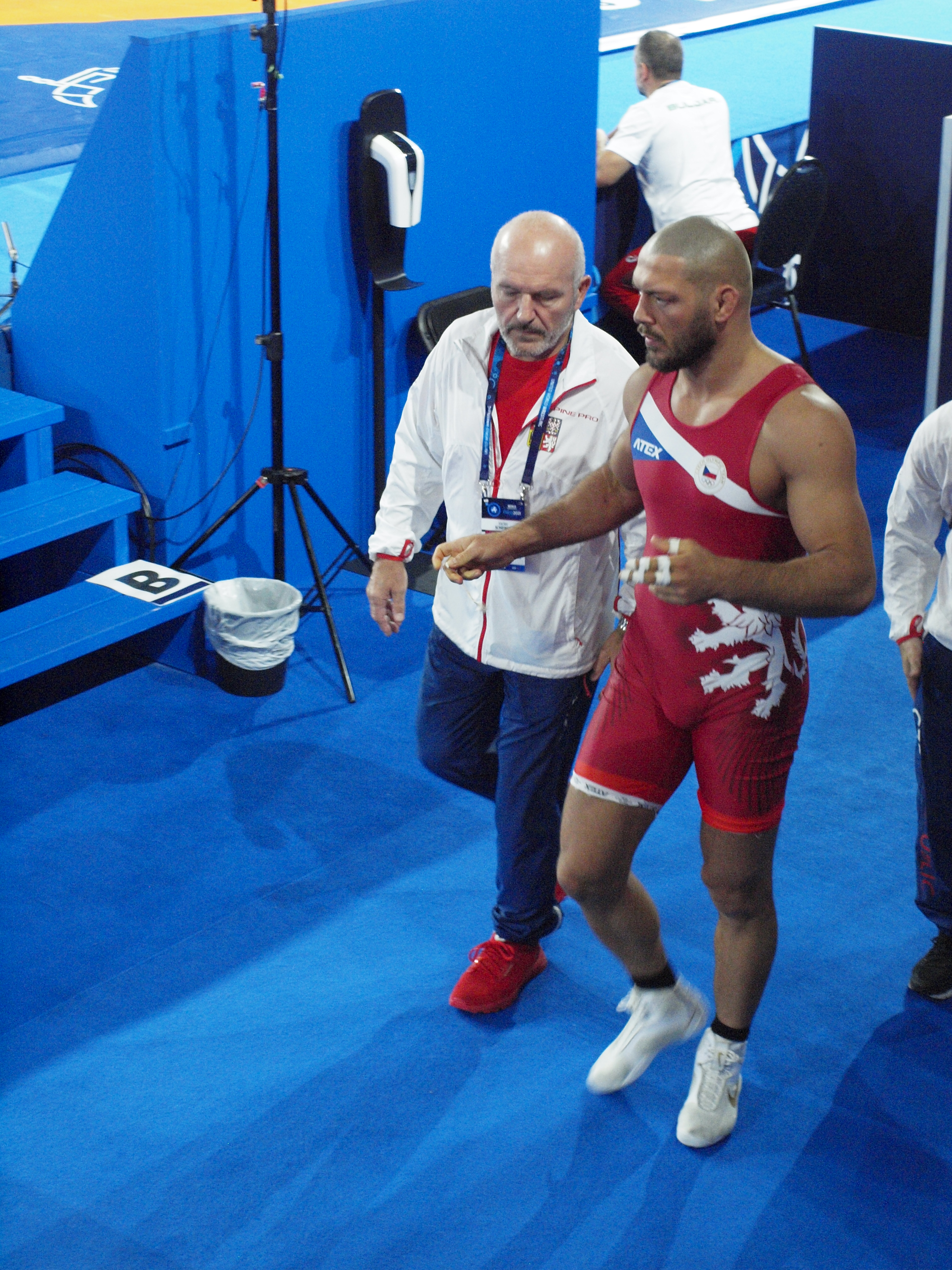
- Artur Omarov at the 2021 World Wrestling Championships in Oslo, Norway

Personal information
- Born: 13 August 1988 (age 37) Dagestan, Soviet Union

Sport
- Country: Czech Republic
- Sport: Amateur wrestling
- Weight class: 97 kg
- Event: Greco-Roman
Medal record
Men's Greco-Roman wrestling
Representing Czech Republic
World Championships
Bronze medal – third place	2023 Serbia	97 kg
Individual World Cup
Bronze medal – third place	2020 Belgrade	97 kg
European Championships
Bronze medal – third place	2023 Zagreb	97 kg

Artur Omarov (born 13 August 1988) is a Russian-born Czech Greco-Roman wrestler of Dargin ethnicity. He represented the Czech Republic at the 2020 Summer Olympics in Tokyo, Japan. He is a bronze medalist at the World Wrestling Championships and the European Wrestling Championships.

== Background ==
Artur was born Tanty village, Akushinsky District, Dagestan, Soviet Union. At the age of four he moved to Czech Republic and started wrestling. He is a devout Sunni Muslim of Dargin ethnicity

== Career ==
Omarov competed at the World Wrestling Championships in 2010, 2011, 2013 – 2015 and 2017 – 2022. He also competed at the European Wrestling Championships in 2013 and 2016 – 2023. In 2015, he competed in the 85 kg event at the European Games held in Baku, Azerbaijan. In 2016, he competed at three qualification tournaments hoping to qualify for the 2016 Summer Olympics in Rio de Janeiro, Brazil.

In March 2021, Omarov competed at the European Qualification Tournament in Budapest, Hungary hoping to qualify for the 2020 Summer Olympics in Tokyo, Japan. He did not qualify at this tournament but, in May 2021, he was able to qualify for the Olympics at the World Olympic Qualification Tournament held in Sofia, Bulgaria. He competed in the men's 97 kg event where he was eliminated in his first match by Alex Szőke of Hungary. In October 2021, he competed in the 97 kg event at the World Wrestling Championships held in Oslo, Norway.

In 2022, Omarov competed in the 97 kg event at the European Wrestling Championships in Budapest, Hungary where he was eliminated in his second match. He competed in the 97 kg event at the 2022 World Wrestling Championships held in Belgrade, Serbia.

Omarov won one of the bronze medals in the 97 kg event at the 2023 European Wrestling Championships held in Zagreb, Croatia. He also won one of the bronze medals in the 97 kg event at the 2023 World Wrestling Championships held in Belgrade, Serbia.

== Achievements ==
Year	Tournament	Location	Result	Event
2023	European Championships	Zagreb, Croatia	3rd	Greco-Roman 97 kg
2023	World Championships	Belgrade, Serbia	3rd	Greco-Roman 97 kg
