= Jimmy Lidberg =

Swedish wrestler (born 1982)

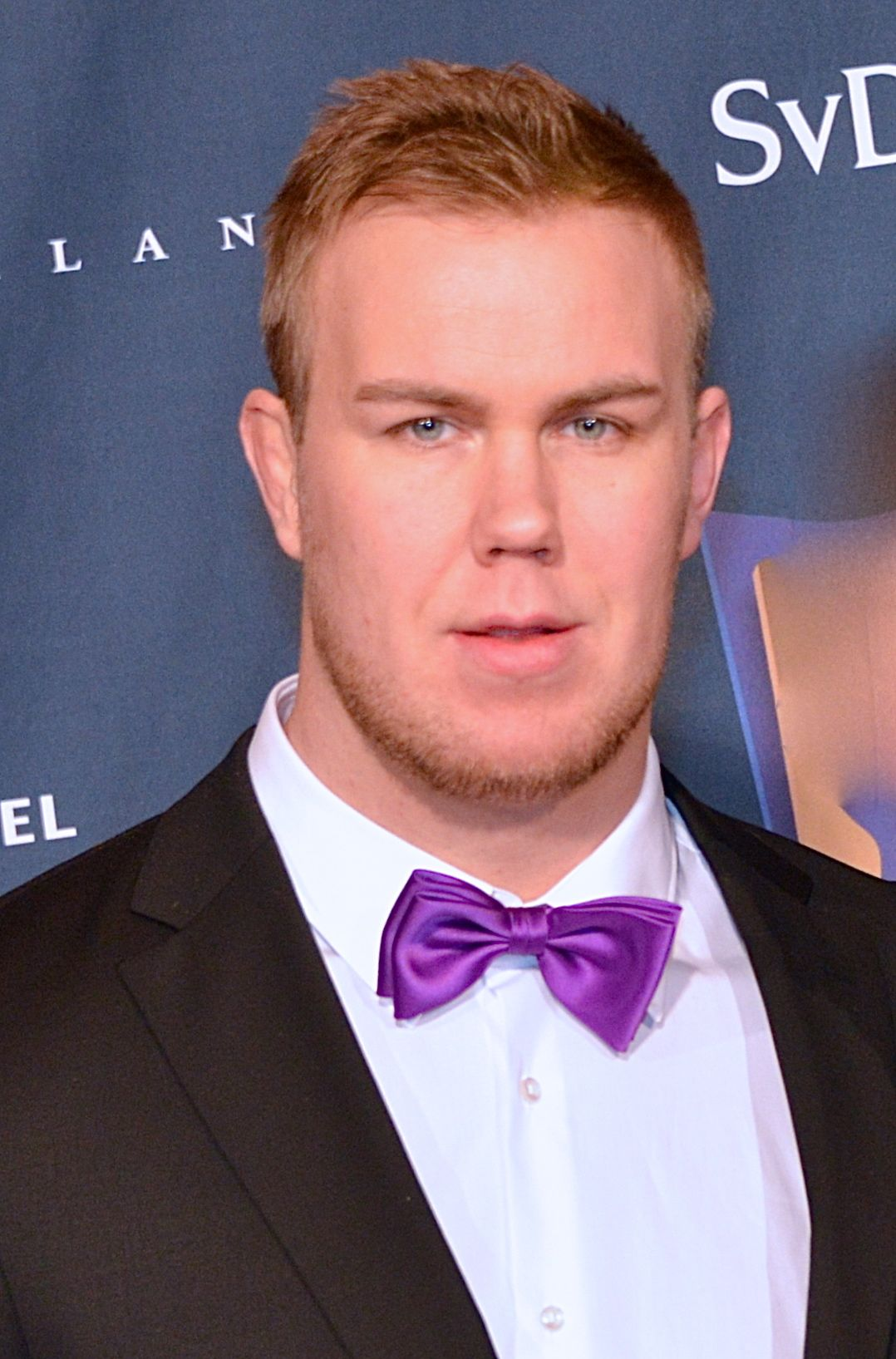

Personal information
- Born: 13 April 1982 (age 44) Farsta, Sweden
- Height: 1.90 m (6 ft 3 in)
- Weight: 96 kg (212 lb)

Sport
- Sport: Wrestling
- Event: Greco-Roman
- Club: Spårvägens BK
- Coached by: Igor Bugay; Benny Ljungbeck
Medal record
Men's Greco-Roman wrestling
Representing Sweden
Olympic Games
| Bronze medal – third place | 2012 London | 96 kg |
World Championships
| Silver medal – second place | 2009 Herning | 96 kg |
| Bronze medal – third place | 2010 Moscow | 96 kg |
| Silver medal – second place | 2011 Istanbul | 96 kg |
European Championships
| Silver medal – second place | 2005 Varna | 96 kg |
| Bronze medal – third place | 2006 Moscow | 96 kg |
| Silver medal – second place | 2007 Sofia | 96 kg |
| Bronze medal – third place | 2009 Vilnius | 96 kg |

Jimmy Lidberg (born 13 April 1982) is a Swedish former Greco-Roman wrestler. He is an Olympic bronze medalist and won several World and European Championship medals as well.

== Biography ==
Lidberg grew up in Farsta and on Södermalm in Stockholm and won several titles in wrestling. His older brother Martin Lidberg is also a former professional wrestler, who has been a world champion, two-time European champion and 19-time Swedish champion. Jimmy Lidberg won his first senior Swedish Championship when he was 17 years old.

He has won three straight European Wrestling Championships medals and three straight World Wrestling Championships medals, while later winning a fourth World Championship medal. Overall, he has won eight consecutive medals from international senior championships. Lidberg was ranked at the top 3 in the world in his weight class in 2007, 2009, and 2012. He won the bronze medal at the 2012 Summer Olympics in the men's Greco-Roman 96 kg category.

In January 2013, he announced that he was retiring from wrestling. As of April 2013 he is head coach of the Norwegian Wrestling Federation. In addition to being a physical trainer and coach, Lidberg also started two companies. He co-founded with two friends the club Huddinge Brottarklubb.

Between 2017 and 2021, Lidberg worked as the fitness coach for football club Hammarby IF in Allsvenskan, Sweden's first tier.

Lidberg's life and career is documented in Bahador Shahidi's documentary film Jimmy the Wrestler (2021) where also Lidberg's brother Martin Lidberg participates.

Lidberg has two children and is the younger brother of fellow wrestler Martin Lidberg.
