= Musa Evloev =

Russian Greco-Roman wrestler (born 1993)

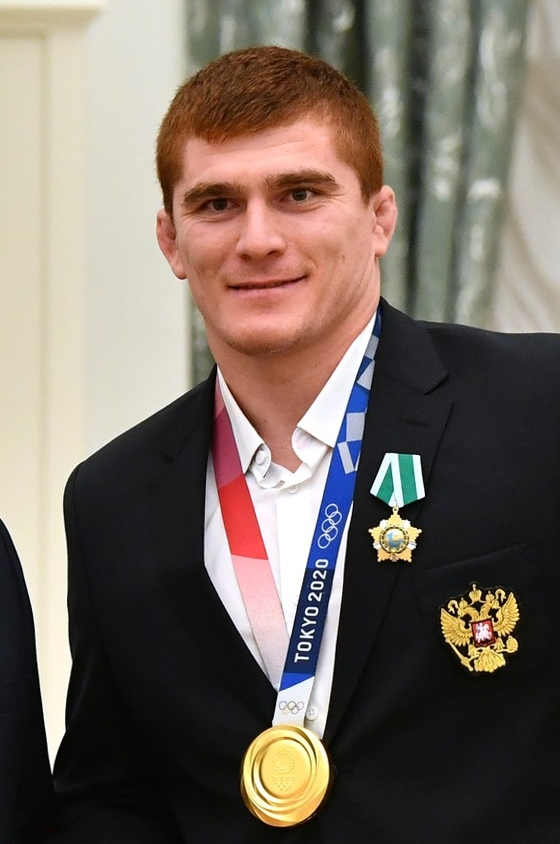
- Evloev in 2021

Personal information
- Native name: Муса Гиланиевич Евлоев
- Full name: Musa Gilaniyevich Evloev
- Nationality: Russian
- Born: 31 March 1993 (age 33) Nesterovskaya, Ingushetia, Russia
- Height: 1.80 m (5 ft 11 in)
- Weight: 96 kg (212 lb)

Sport
- Country: Russia
- Sport: Wrestling
- Event: Greco-Roman
- Club: Sparta
- Coached by: F. P. Avakov, V. V. Khromov
Medal record
Men's Greco-Roman wrestling
Representing (Russia) ROC
Olympic Games
| Gold medal – first place | 2020 Tokyo | 97 kg |
Representing Russia
World Championships
| Gold medal – first place | 2018 Budapest | 97 kg |
| Gold medal – first place | 2019 Nur-Sultan | 97 kg |
| Silver medal – second place | 2017 Paris | 98 kg |
European Championships
| Gold medal – first place | 2021 Warsaw | 97 kg |
| Gold medal – first place | 2019 Bucharest | 97 kg |
Individual World Cup
| Gold medal – first place | 2020 Belgrade | 97 kg |
World Cup
| Gold medal – first place | 2017 Tehran | 98 kg |
Military World Games
| Gold medal – first place | 2019 Wuhan | 97 kg |

Musa Gilaniyevich Evloev (Russian: Муса Гиланиевич Евлоев, IPA: [mʊˈsa ɪ̯ɪˈvɫo(ɪ̯)ɪf]; born 31 March 1993) is a Russian Greco-Roman wrestler. He won the gold medal in the 97 kg event at the 2020 Summer Olympics held in Tokyo, Japan. He is also a two-time world champion and two-time national champion, having won in 2016 and 2017. Internationally, Evloev won silver at the 2017 World Wrestling Championships in Paris, France, losing to Artur Aleksanyan from Armenia. That year he also won the 2017 Wrestling World Cup in Tehran, Iran.

He won the 2018 World Wrestling Championships, now in the 97 kg division, defeating Bulgarian Kiril Milov, 7–2 and at the 2019 World Wrestling Championships he won gold medal again, in the final match he beat Artur Aleksanyan.

In 2020, he won the gold medal in the 97 kg event at the Individual Wrestling World Cup held in Belgrade, Serbia. In 2021, he won the gold medal in the men's 97 kg event at the Matteo Pellicone Ranking Series 2021 held in Rome, Italy.

Evloev was barred from participating in the qualifying tournament for the 2024 Summer Olympics after being photographed standing near a poster reading "No to Nazism".
