= Arvi Savolainen =

Finnish Greco-Roman wrestler

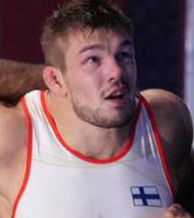
- Savolainen in 2020

Personal information
- Full name: Arvi Martin Savolainen
- Born: 24 October 1998 (age 27) Lahti, Finland

Sport
- Country: Finland
- Sport: Amateur wrestling
- Weight class: 97 kg
- Event: Greco-Roman
Medal record
Men's Greco-Roman wrestling
Representing Finland
European Championships
Silver medal – second place	2022 Budapest	97 kg
World Military Championships
Silver medal – second place	2025 Warendorf	97 kg
Vehbi Emre & Hamit Kaplan Tournament
Silver medal – second place	2022 Istanbul	97 kg
World U23 Championships
Gold medal – first place	2019 Budapest	97 kg
Bronze medal – third place	2021 Belgrade	97 kg
European U23 Championship
Gold medal – first place	2019 Novi Sad	97 kg
Bronze medal – third place	2018 Istanbul	97 kg
World Junior Championships
Gold medal – first place	2018 Trnava	97 kg
Bronze medal – third place	2017 Tampere	96 kg
European Juniors Championships
Gold medal – first place	2017 Rome	96 kg
Bronze medal – third place	2018 Dortmund	97 kg

Arvi Martin Savolainen (born 24 October 1998) is a Finnish Greco-Roman wrestler. He won the silver medal in the 97 kg event at the 2022 European Wrestling Championships held in Budapest, Hungary. He represented Finland at the 2020 Summer Olympics in Tokyo, Japan and the 2024 Summer Olympics in Paris, France.

== Career ==
Savolainen won a bronze medal at the 2015 Cadet Wrestling World Championships held in Sarajevo, Bosnia and Herzegovina. He won one of the bronze medals in the men's 67 kg event at the 2018 European U23 Wrestling Championship held in Istanbul, Turkey. In 2019, Savolainen won the gold medal in the men's 97 kg event at the World U23 Wrestling Championship in Budapest, Hungary. In 2020, he lost his bronze medal match against Jello Krahmer of Germany in the 130 kg event at the European Wrestling Championships held in Rome, Italy.

In January 2021, Savolainen won the gold medal in the 97 kg event at the Grand Prix Zagreb Open held in Zagreb, Croatia. In March 2021, he qualified at the European Qualification Tournament to compete at the 2020 Summer Olympics in Tokyo, Japan. In April 2021, he competed in the 97 kg event at the European Wrestling Championships held in Warsaw, Poland. A few months later, he won one of the bronze medals in his event at the 2021 Wladyslaw Pytlasinski Cup held in Warsaw, Poland.

At the 2020 Summer Olympics, Savolainen lost his bronze medal match against Mohammad Hadi Saravi of Iran in the 97 kg event. At the 2021 U23 World Wrestling Championships held in Belgrade, Serbia, he won one of the bronze medals in the 97 kg event.

In 2022, Savolainen won the silver medal in his event at the Vehbi Emre & Hamit Kaplan Tournament held in Istanbul, Turkey. He won the silver medal in the 97 kg event at the 2022 European Wrestling Championships held in Budapest, Hungary. A few months later, he won one of the bronze medals in his event at the Matteo Pellicone Ranking Series 2022 held in Rome, Italy.

Savolainen competed at the 2024 European Wrestling Olympic Qualification Tournament in Baku, Azerbaijan hoping to qualify for the 2024 Summer Olympics in Paris, France. He was eliminated in his first match and he did not qualify for the Olympics. A month later, he earned a quota place for Finland for the Olympics at the 2024 World Wrestling Olympic Qualification Tournament held in Istanbul, Turkey. He competed in the 97 kg event at the Olympics. He was eliminated in his second match by eventual bronze medalist Gabriel Rosillo of Cuba.

== Achievements ==
Year	Tournament	Location	Result	Event
2022	European Championships	Budapest, Hungary	2nd	Greco-Roman 97 kg
