= Balázs Kiss (wrestler) =

Hungarian Greco-Roman wrestler

Personal information
- Nationality: Hungarian
- Born: 27 January 1983 (age 43) Hungary

Sport
- Sport: Sport wrestling
- Event: Greco-Roman
Medal record
Men's Greco-Roman wrestling
Representing Hungary
World Championships
Gold medal – first place	2009 Herning	96 kg
Bronze medal – third place	2013 Budapest	96 kg
Bronze medal – third place	2017 Paris	98 kg
European Championships
Bronze medal – third place	2007 Sofia	96 kg
Bronze medal – third place	2017 Novi Sad	98 kg
Bronze medal – third place	2018 Kaspiysk	97 kg

Balázs Kiss (born 27 January 1983) is a Hungarian Greco-Roman wrestler. He won the bronze medal in the 96 kg division at the 2013 World Wrestling Championships.

== Major results ==
Year	Tournament	Venue	Result	Event
2003	European Championships	Belgrade, Serbia and Montenegro	9th	Greco-Roman 84 kg
2003	World Championships	Créteil, France	16th	Greco-Roman 84 kg
2006	European Championships	Moscow, Russia	7th	Greco-Roman 96 kg
2007	European Championships	Sofia, Bulgaria	3rd	Greco-Roman 96 kg
2007	World Championships	Baku, Azerbaijan	18th	Greco-Roman 96 kg
2008	European Championships	Tampere, Finland	12th	Greco-Roman 96 kg
2009	European Championships	Vilnius, Lithuania	18th	Greco-Roman 96 kg
2009	World Championships	Herning, Denmark	1st	Greco-Roman 96 kg
2011	European Championships	Dortmund, Germany	9th	Greco-Roman 96 kg
2011	World Championships	Istanbul, Turkey	14th	Greco-Roman 96 kg
2013	European Championships	Tbilisi, Georgia	16th	Greco-Roman 96 kg
2013	World Championships	Budapest, Hungary	3rd	Greco-Roman 96 kg
2014	European Championships	Vantaa, Finland	8th	Greco-Roman 98 kg
2015	World Championships	Las Vegas, United States	20th	Greco-Roman 98 kg
2016	Olympic Games	Rio de Janeiro, Brazil	9th	Greco-Roman 98 kg
2017	European Championships	Novi Sad, Serbia	3rd	Greco-Roman 98 kg
2017	World Championships	Paris, France	3rd	Greco-Roman 98 kg
2018	European Championships	Kaspiysk, Russia	3rd	Greco-Roman 97 kg
