= Mikheil Kajaia =

Serbian Greco-Roman wrestler

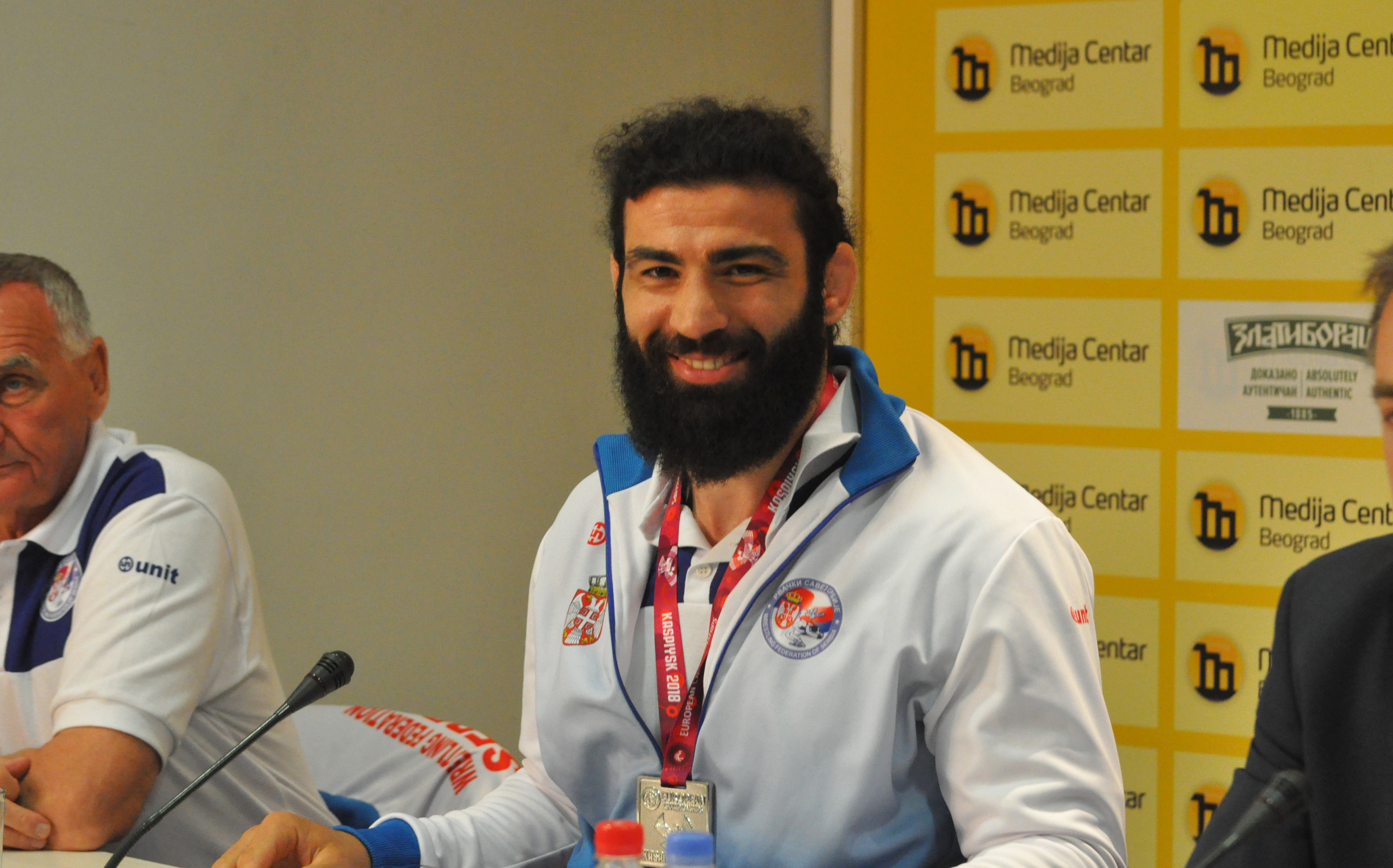
- Kajaia in 2018

Personal information
- Born: 21 July 1989 (age 37) Tskaltubo, Georgian SSR, Soviet Union
- Height: 1.87 m (6 ft 2 in)
- Weight: 97 kg (214 lb)

Sport
- Country: Georgia (2010–2017); Serbia (2017–)
- Sport: Wrestling
- Event: Greco-Roman
Medal record
Men's Greco-Roman wrestling
Representing Serbia
World Championships
| Bronze medal – third place | 2018 Budapest | 97 kg |
| Bronze medal – third place | 2019 Nur-Sultan | 97 kg |
European Championships
| Silver medal – second place | 2018 Kaspiysk | 97 kg |
| Bronze medal – third place | 2023 Zagreb | 97 kg |
Mediterranean Games
| Bronze medal – third place | 2018 Tarragona | 97 kg |
Representing Georgia
Summer Universiade
| Bronze medal – third place | 2013 Kazan | 96 kg |

Mikheil Kajaia (Georgian: მიხეილ ქაჯაია; Serbian: Михаил Каџаја, Mihail Kadžaja; born 21 July 1989) is a Georgian-born Serbian Greco-Roman wrestler.

== Career ==
Representing Georgia, Kajaia participated in the 2013 Summer Universiade and he won the bronze medal in the 96 kg event. He was part of the Georgian Wrestling Team at the 2015 European Games but lost to Italian Daigoro Timoncini at the 1/8 finals.

In 2017, Kajaia started to wrestle for Serbia. He entered the 2017 European Wrestling Championships in Novi Sad, Serbia but defeated by the Olympic champion Artur Aleksanyan in the second round. One year later, he won his first European medal, a silver, in Kaspiysk, Russia. He reached the final at 97 kg but lost to Artur Aleksanyan again with a score of 0-7. At the 2018 Mediterranean Games in Tarragona, Spain, he lost to the eventual champion, Frenchman Mélonin Noumonvi, in the semifinals but still successfully grabbed a bronze medal. Kajaia later won his first world bronze medal in Budapest, Hungary. In the bronze-medal match, Kajaia faced former world champion and home favourite Balázs Kiss. Kajaia trailed 0-3 after the first period but managed a turnaround by winning on criteria with a four-point arm throw. In April 2021, he competed in the 97 kg event at the 2021 European Wrestling Championships held in Warsaw, Poland.

He competed in the men's 97 kg event at the 2020 Summer Olympics held in Tokyo, Japan.

In 2022, he competed at the Matteo Pellicone Ranking Series 2022 held in Rome, Italy. He competed in the 97 kg event at the 2022 World Wrestling Championships held in Belgrade, Serbia.

He competed at the 2024 European Wrestling Olympic Qualification Tournament in Baku, Azerbaijan hoping to qualify for the 2024 Summer Olympics in Paris, France. He was eliminated in his third match and he did not qualify for the Olympics. Kajaia also competed at the 2024 World Wrestling Olympic Qualification Tournament held in Istanbul, Turkey without qualifying for the Olympics. He was able to compete at the Olympics and he competed in the 97 kg event.
