= List of Estonian sportspeople =

This is a list of notable Estonian sportspeople. The criteria for inclusion in this list are:

- 1–3 places winners at major international tournaments;
- for team sports, winning in preliminary competitions of finals at major international tournaments, or playing for several seasons for clubs of major national leagues; or
- holders of past and current world records.

== Athletics ==
- Rein Aun
- Ksenija Balta
- Bruno Junk
- Gerd Kanter
- Aleksander Klumberg
- Johannes Kotkas
- Pavel Loskutov
- Jüri Lossmann
- Rasmus Mägi
- Erki Nool
- Mikk Pahapill
- Uno Palu
- Jane Salumäe
- Jüri Tamm
- Aleksander Tammert
- Jüri Tarmak
- Jaak Uudmäe
- Andrus Värnik

== Basketball ==
- Heino Enden
- Kristjan Kangur
- Anatoli Krikun
- Heino Kruus
- Ilmar Kullam
- Gert Kullamäe
- Mart Laga
- Tõnno Lepmets
- Jaak Lipso
- Joann Lõssov
- Martin Müürsepp
- Jaak Salumets
- Tiit Sokk
- Aleksei Tammiste
- Priit Tomson
- Siim-Sander Vene

== Biathlon ==
- Kaija Parve
- Indrek Tobreluts

== Boxing ==
- Nikolai Stepulov

== Canoeing ==
- Mikhail Kaaleste
- Heino Kurvet

== Cross-country skiing ==
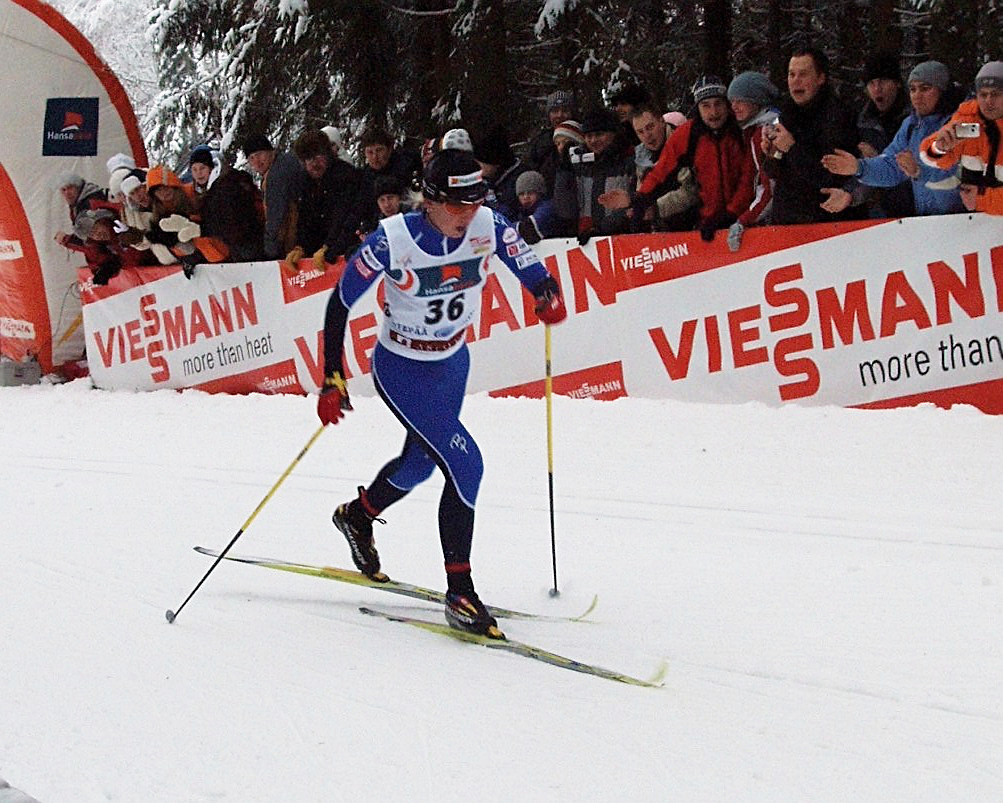
Kristina Šmigun-Vähi

- Jaak Mae
- Kristina Šmigun-Vähi
- Andrus Veerpalu

== Cycling ==
- Tõnis Erm
- Tanel Kangert
- Jaan Kirsipuu
- Aavo Pikkuus
- Erika Salumäe
- Riho Suun
- Rein Taaramäe

== Disc golf ==
- Kristin Tattar

== Fencing ==
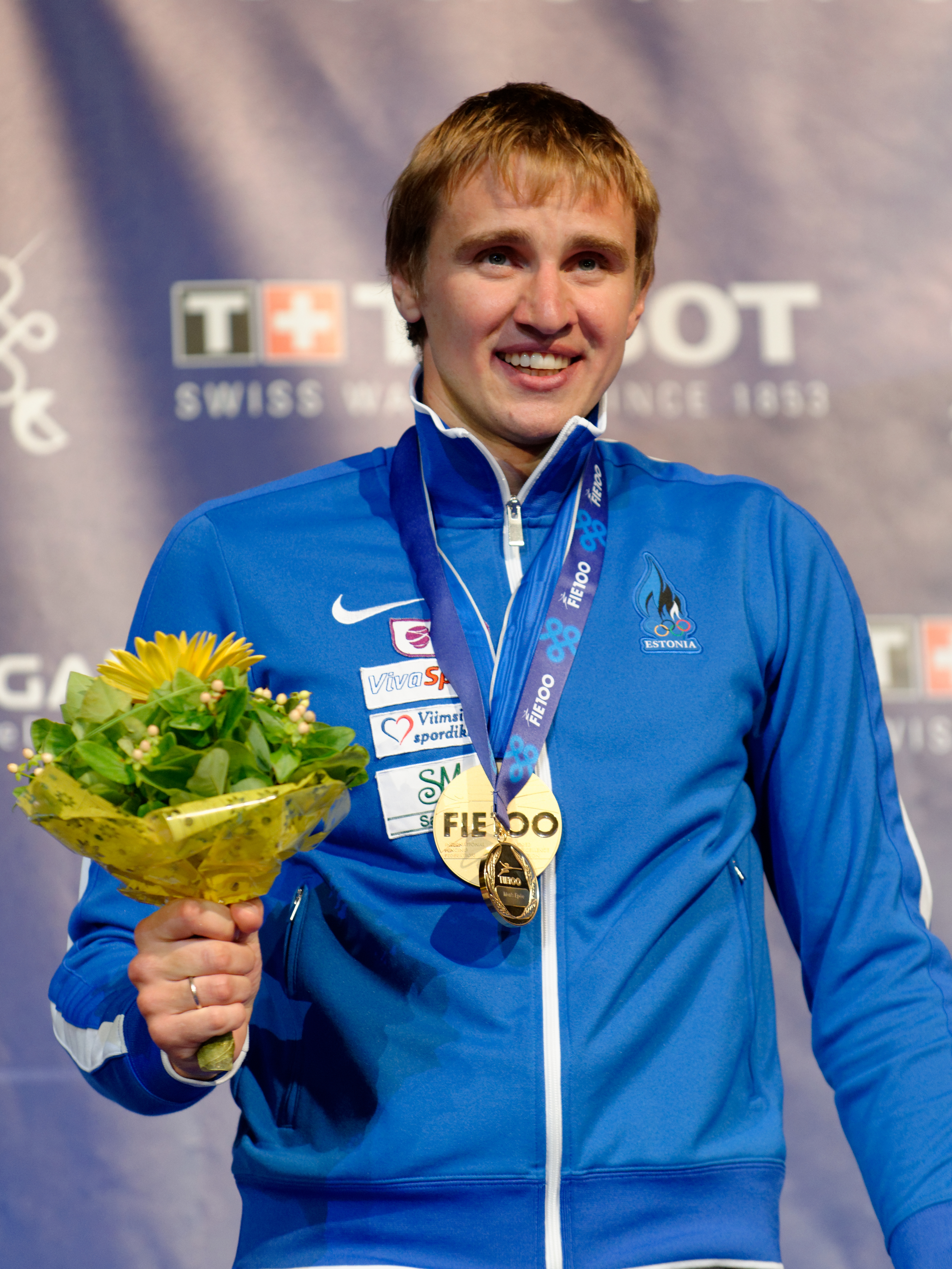
Nikolai Novosjolov

- Julia Beljajeva
- Irina Embrich
- Sven Järve
- Kaido Kaaberma
- Erika Kirpu
- Kristina Kuusk
- Meelis Loit
- Nikolai Novosjolov
- Heidi Rohi
- Maarika Võsu
- Oksana Yermakova
- Viktor Zuikov

== Football ==
- Ragnar Klavan
- Marek Lemsalu
- Marko Meerits
- Henrik Ojamaa
- Andres Oper
- Raio Piiroja
- Mart Poom
- Andrei Stepanov
- Konstantin Vassiljev
- Indrek Zelinski

== Freestyle skiing ==
- Kelly Sildaru

== Judo ==
- Aleksei Budõlin
- Martin Padar
- Indrek Pertelson

== Modern pentathlon ==
- Hanno Selg

== Motorsport ==
- Paul Aron
- Ralf Aron
- Marko Asmer
- Kevin Korjus
- Jüri Vips

== Nordic combined ==
- Allar Levandi

== Rallying ==
- Markko Märtin
- Ott Tänak

== Rowing ==
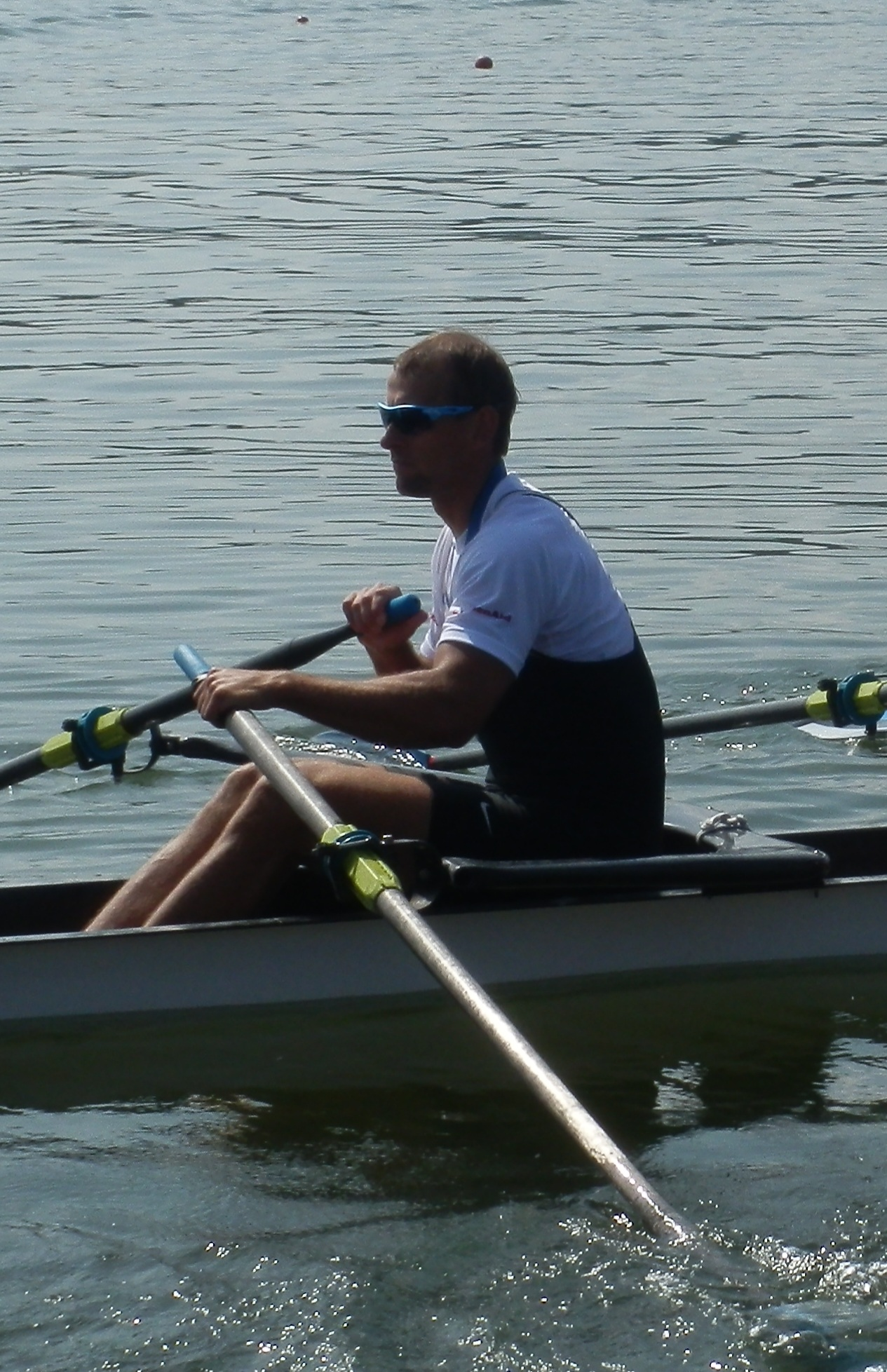
Tõnu Endrekson

- Raul Arnemann
- Tõnu Endrekson
- Leonid Gulov
- Jüri Jaanson
- Andrei Jämsä
- Mart Kuusik
- Igor Kuzmin
- Vladimir Latin
- Kaisa Pajusalu
- Allar Raja
- Kaspar Taimsoo

== Sailing ==
- Aleksandr Chuchelov
- Andreas Faehlmann
- Georg Faehlmann
- Deniss Karpak
- Tõnu Tõniste
- Toomas Tõniste
- Nikolai Vekšin
- Eberhard Vogdt
- William von Wirén

== Speed skating ==
- Ants Antson

== Swimming ==
- Martti Aljand
- Triin Aljand
- Kaire Indrikson
- Eneli Jefimova
- Indrek Sei
- Ivar Stukolkin
- Eve Uusmees
- Ulvi Voog

== Tennis ==
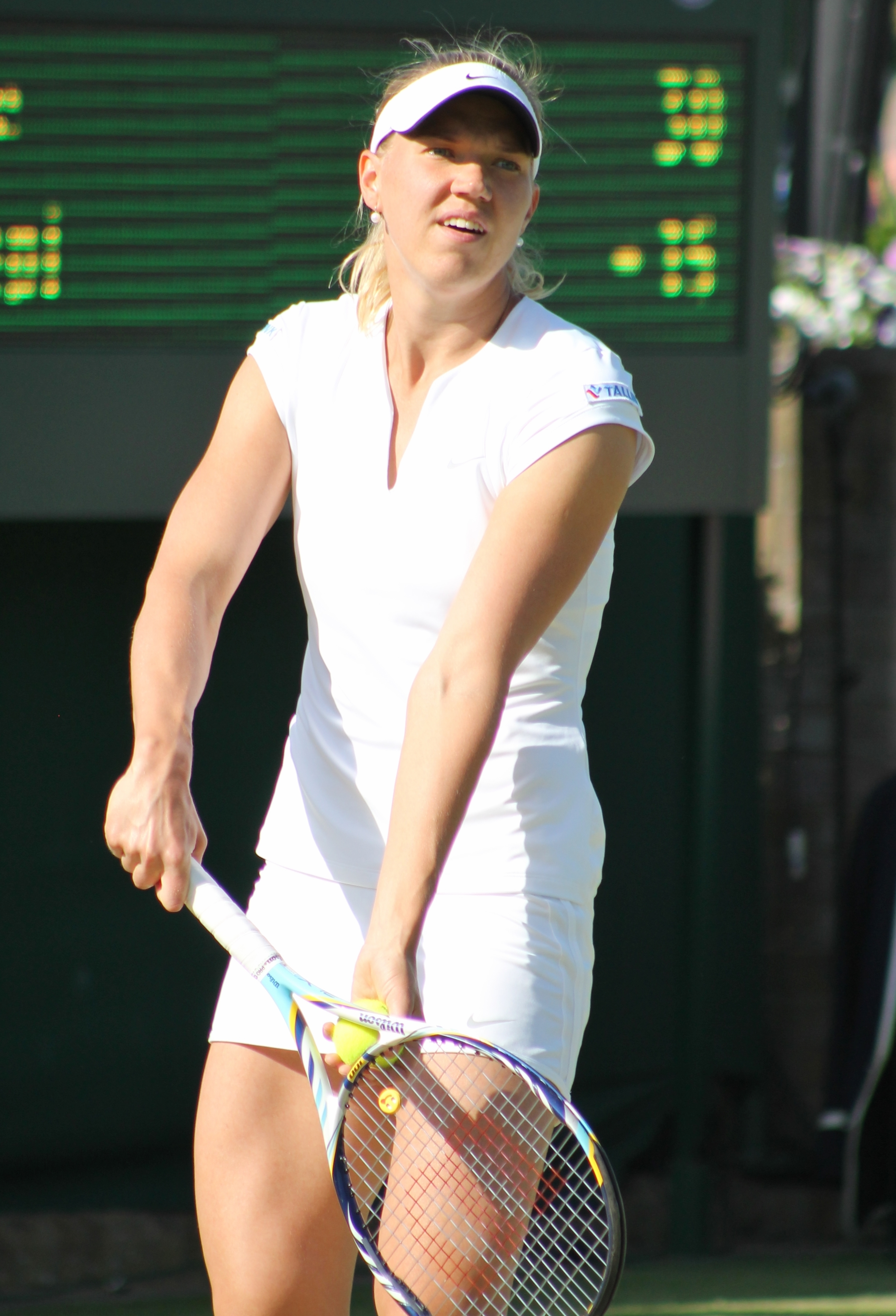
Kaia Kanepi

- Kaia Kanepi
- Anett Kontaveit
- Toomas Leius

== Volleyball ==
- Viljar Loor

== Weightlifting ==
- Gustav Ernesaks
- Jaan Kikkas
- Arnold Luhaäär
- Alfred Neuland
- Alfred Schmidt
- Mart Seim
- Jaan Talts
- Harald Tammer

== Wrestling ==
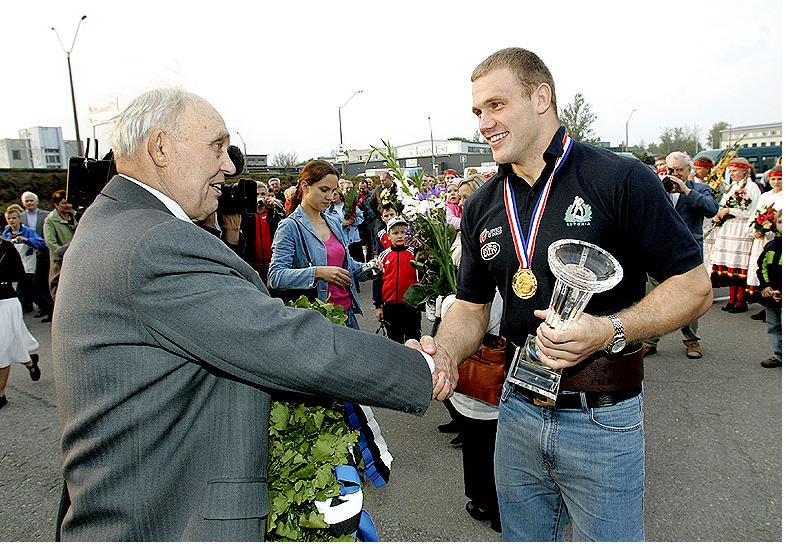
August Englas and Heiki Nabi

- Georg Baumann
- August Englas
- Oskar Kaplur
- Osvald Käpp
- Martin Klein
- Albert Kusnets
- Epp Mäe
- Heiki Nabi
- August Neo
- Kristjan Palusalu
- Eduard Pütsep
- Roman Steinberg
- Voldemar Väli

== See also ==
- Estonian Athlete of the Year
- Estonia at the Olympics
- Sport in Estonia
