= Estonia at the 2008 Summer Olympics =

- IOC code: EST
- NOC: Estonian Olympic Committee
- Website: www.eok.ee (in Estonian)

in Beijing
- Competitors: 47 in 13 sports
- Flag bearers: Martin Padar (opening); Gerd Kanter (closing)
- Officials: 28
- Medals Ranked 46th: Gold 1 Silver 1 Bronze 0 Total 2

Summer Olympics appearances (overview)
- 1920; 1924; 1928; 1932; 1936; 1948–1988; 1992; 1996; 2000; 2004; 2008; 2012; 2016; 2020; 2024; 2028

Other related appearances
- Russian Empire (1908–1912); Soviet Union (1952–1988)

Estonia competed at the 2008 Summer Olympics in Beijing, People's Republic of China. This is a list of the results of all Estonian athletes who qualified for the Olympics and were nominated by Estonian Olympic Committee. Estonia was represented in the 2008 Beijing Olympic Games by 47 athletes in total of 13 different sporting events. The Estonian delegation, the largest in the nation's Olympic history, marched into the Beijing National Olympic stadium as the 160th nation, before Haiti and after Ireland delegations during the opening ceremony.

Jüri Jaanson, who competed at his sixth Olympics, was the oldest and most experienced team member, and became Estonia's oldest Olympic medal winner with the age of 42 years, 10 months and two days.

== Medalists ==
Medal	Name	Sport	Event
Gold	Gerd Kanter	Athletics	Men's discus throw
Silver	Jüri Jaanson; Tõnu Endrekson	Rowing	Men's double sculls

== Athletics ==
Key

- Note–Ranks given for track events are within the athlete's heat only
- Q = Qualified for the next round
- q = Qualified for a

the next round as a fastest loser or, in field events, by position without achieving the qualifying target

- NR = National record
- N/A = Round not applicable for the event
- Bye = Athlete not required to compete in round

Men
Track & road events

Athlete	Event	Heat		Semifinal		Final	
Athlete	Event	Result	Rank	Result	Rank	Result	Rank
Tiidrek Nurme	1500 m	3:38.59 NR	9	Did not advance			
Pavel Loskutov	Marathon	—N/a				2:39:01	75

Field events

Athlete	Event	Qualification		Final	
Athlete	Event	Distance	Position	Distance	Position
Märt Israel	Discus throw	61.98	14	Did not advance	
Gerd Kanter	Discus throw	64.66	5 Q	68.82	1st place, gold medalist(s)
Mihkel Kukk	Javelin throw	75.56	21	Did not advance	
Taavi Peetre	Shot put	19.57	26	Did not advance	
Aleksander Tammert	Discus throw	63.10	10 q	61.38	12

Combined events – Decathlon

Athlete	Event	100 m	LJ	SP	HJ	400 m	110H	DT	PV	JT	1500 m	Final	Rank
Mikk Pahapill	Result	11.15	7.04	14.36	2.11	50.90	14.51	49.35	4.80	67.07	4:47.03	8178	10
Mikk Pahapill	Points	827	823	750	906	774	910	857	849	845	637	8178	10
Andres Raja	Result	10.89	7.29	14.79	1.96	48.98	14.06	39.83	4.80	67.16	4:49.60	8118	12
Andres Raja	Points	885	883	777	767	862	967	661	849	846	621	8118	12

Women
Field events

Athlete	Event	Qualification		Final	
Athlete	Event	Distance	Position	Distance	Position
Moonika Aava	Javelin throw	56.94	26	Did not advance	
Ksenija Balta	Long jump	6.38	27	Did not advance	
Anna Iljuštšenko	High jump	1.89	18	Did not advance	
Kaire Leibak	Triple jump	14.19	11 q	14.13	8

Combined events – Heptathlon

Athlete	Event	100H	HJ	SP	200 m	LJ	JT	800 m	Final	Rank
Kaie Kand	Result	14.47	1.65	12.91	25.49	5.75	42.51	2:13.36	5677	32*
Kaie Kand	Points	913	795	721	842	774	716	916	5677	32*

* The athlete who finished in second place, Lyudmila Blonska of Ukraine, tested positive for a banned substance. Both the A and the B tests were positive, therefore Blonska was stripped of her silver medal, and Kand moved up a position.

== Badminton ==
Estonia had qualified two berths in men's and women's badminton events.

Athlete	Event	Round of 64	Round of 32	Round of 16	Quarterfinal	Semifinal	Final / BM	
Athlete	Event	Opposition Score	Opposition Score	Opposition Score	Opposition Score	Opposition Score	Opposition Score	Rank
Raul Must	Men's singles	Wacha (POL); L 14–21, 15–21	Did not advance					
Kati Tolmoff	Women's singles	Magee (IRL); L 21–18, 18–21, 19–21	Did not advance					

== Cycling ==
=== Road ===
Estonia had qualified three quota places in road cycling. For the first time in Olympic history, it also sent its first female road cyclist. Rein Taaramäe, who finished seventeenth in men's road race, achieved the best result for the nation's sport.

Athlete	Event	Time	Rank
Tanel Kangert	Men's road race	6:36:48	69
Rein Taaramäe	Men's road race	6:30:49	48
Rein Taaramäe	Men's time trial	1:05:47	17
Grete Treier	Women's road race	3:33:17	30

=== Track ===
Sprint

Athlete	Event	Qualification		Round 1	Round 2	Quarterfinals	Semifinals	Final	
Athlete	Event	Time Speed (km/h)	Rank	Opposition Time Speed (km/h)	Opposition Time Speed (km/h)	Opposition Time Speed (km/h)	Opposition Time Speed (km/h)	Opposition Time Speed (km/h)	Rank
Daniel Novikov	Men's sprint	11.187; 64.360	21	Did not advance					

== Fencing ==
Men

Athlete	Event	Round of 64	Round of 32	Round of 16	Quarterfinal	Semifinal	Final / BM	
Athlete	Event	Opposition Score	Opposition Score	Opposition Score	Opposition Score	Opposition Score	Opposition Score	Rank
Nikolai Novosjolov	Individual épée	Nabil (EGY); W 15–8	Jeannet (FRA); L 14–15	Did not advance				

== Gymnastics ==
=== Rhythmic ===
Athlete	Event	Qualification						Final					
Athlete	Event	Rope	Hoop	Clubs	Ribbon	Total	Rank	Rope	Hoop	Clubs	Ribbon	Total	Rank
Irina Kikkas	Individual	15.650	15.225	15.700	16.200	62.775	20	Did not advance					

== Judo ==
Athlete	Event	Preliminary	Round of 32	Round of 16	Quarterfinals	Semifinals	Repechage 1	Repechage 2	Repechage 3	Final / BM	
Athlete	Event	Opposition Result	Opposition Result	Opposition Result	Opposition Result	Opposition Result	Opposition Result	Opposition Result	Opposition Result	Opposition Result	Rank
Martin Padar	Men's +100 kg	Bye	Kim S-B (KOR); W 1100–0000	Schlitter (BRA); L 0000–0010	Did not advance						

== Rowing ==
Men

Athlete	Event	Heats		Repechage		Quarterfinals		Semifinals		Final	
Athlete	Event	Time	Rank	Time	Rank	Time	Rank	Time	Rank	Time	Rank
Andrei Jämsä	Single sculls	7:48.20	4 QF	—N/a		7:05.48	4 SC/D	7:16.38	2 FC	7:19.60	17
Tõnu Endrekson; Jüri Jaanson	Double sculls	6:27.95	3 SA/B	Bye		—N/a		6:21.11	2 FA	6:29.05	2nd place, silver medalist(s)
Igor Kuzmin; Vladimir Latin; Allar Raja; Kaspar Taimsoo	Quadruple sculls	5:42.22	4 R	6:01.46	1 SA/B	—N/a		5:54.57	4 FB	5:48.12	9

Qualification Legend: FA=Final A (medal); FB=Final B (non-medal); FC=Final C (non-medal); FD=Final D (non-medal); FE=Final E (non-medal); FF=Final F (non-medal); SA/B=Semifinals A/B; SC/D=Semifinals C/D; SE/F=Semifinals E/F; QF=Quarterfinals; R=Repechage

== Sailing ==
Men

Athlete	Event	Race											Net points	Final rank
Athlete	Event	1	2	3	4	5	6	7	8	9	10	M*	Net points	Final rank
Johannes Ahun	RS:X	~~35~~	34	32	34	31	30	29	25	30	28	EL	273	33
Deniss Karpak	Laser	16	20	~~41~~	37	38	2	4	35	14	CAN	EL	166	25

M = Medal race; EL = Eliminated – did not advance into the medal race; CAN = Race cancelled

== Shooting ==
Men

Athlete	Event	Qualification		Final	
Athlete	Event	Points	Rank	Points	Rank
Andrei Inešin	Skeet	115	18	Did not advance	

== Swimming ==
Men

Athlete	Event	Heat		Semifinal		Final	
Athlete	Event	Time	Rank	Time	Rank	Time	Rank
Martti Aljand	100 m breaststroke	1:02.46 NR	45	Did not advance			
Martti Aljand	200 m breaststroke	2:16.52	46	Did not advance			
Danil Haustov	100 m freestyle	50.92	51	Did not advance			
Martin Liivamägi	200 m individual medley	2:03.56	35	Did not advance			
Miko Mälberg	50 m freestyle	22.37 NR	25	Did not advance			
Andres Olvik	200 m backstroke	2:03.66	40	Did not advance			
Vladimir Sidorkin	200 m freestyle	1:51.27 NR	45	Did not advance			

Women

Athlete	Event	Heat		Semifinal		Final	
Athlete	Event	Time	Rank	Time	Rank	Time	Rank
Triin Aljand	50 m freestyle	25.29	21	Did not advance			
Triin Aljand	100 m freestyle	56.10	33	Did not advance			
Triin Aljand	100 m butterfly	59.43 NR	32	Did not advance			
Elina Partõka	200 m freestyle	2:00.64 NR	28	Did not advance			
Anna-Liisa Põld	400 m individual medley	4:58.21	35	—N/a		Did not advance	

== Tennis ==
Athlete	Event	Round of 64	Round of 32	Round of 16	Quarterfinals	Semifinals	Final / BM	
Athlete	Event	Opposition Score	Opposition Score	Opposition Score	Opposition Score	Opposition Score	Opposition Score	Rank
Maret Ani	Women's singles	Šafářová (CZE); L 4–6, 2–6	Did not advance					
Kaia Kanepi	Women's singles	Pennetta (ITA); W 6–2, 7–6^{(8–6)}	Razzano (FRA); W 6–4, 7–5	Li N (CHN); L 6–4, 2–6, 0–6	Did not advance			
Maret Ani; Kaia Kanepi	Women's doubles	—N/a	Azarenka / Poutchek (BLR); L 2–6, 2–6	Did not advance				

== Triathlon ==
Athlete	Event	Swim (1.5 km)	Trans 1	Bike (40 km)	Trans 2	Run (10 km)	Total Time	Rank
Marko Albert	Men's	18:09	0:29	59:12	0:29	35:54	1:54:13.58	41

== Volleyball ==
=== Beach ===
Athlete	Event	Preliminary round	Standing	Round of 16	Quarterfinals	Semifinals	Final / BM	
Athlete	Event	Opposition Score	Standing	Opposition Score	Opposition Score	Opposition Score	Opposition Score	Rank
Kristjan Kais; Rivo Vesik	Men's	Pool A Herrera – Mesa (ESP); L 0 – 2 (18–21, 21–23); Wu – Xu (CHN); L 1 – 2 (21–15, 11–21, 13–15); Gosch – Horst (AUT); L 1 – 2 (16–21, 21–18, 12–15)	4	Did not advance				

== See also ==
- Estonia at the 2008 Summer Paralympics
