= Estonian Sports Team of the Year =

Estonian award

Estonian Sports Team of the Year is chosen annually each December, since 1969.

The winner is voted by a group of sports journalists, public, and sports associations.

== List of award winners ==
Year	Estonian Sports Team of the Year
1969	Tartu Kalev basketball team
1970	Kalev basketball team
1971	Estonia men's national basketball team
1972	Tartu Kalev double sculls academic rowing team
1973	Tartu Kalev quadruple sculls academic rowing team
1974	Soling sailing team
1975	Soling sailing team
1976	double sculls academic rowing team Gennadi Kinko – Tiit Helmja
1977	Kalev volleyball team
1978	Tallinna Linnuvabrik women's handball team
1979	double sculls academic rowing team Gennadi Kinko – Tiit Helmja
1980	rally team Eedo Raide – Georg Valdek
1981	rally team Heiki Ohu – Toomas Diener
1982	rally team Vello Õunpuu – Aarne Timusk
1983	TRÜ women's basketball team
1984	100 km maanteesõidu meeskond jalgrattaspordis
1985	100 km maanteesõidu meeskond jalgrattaspordis
1986	Estonia men's epee team
1987	Kalev basketball team
1988	470 sailing team Toomas Tõniste – Tõnu Tõniste
1989	Kalev basketball team
1990	470 sailing team Toomas Tõniste – Tõnu Tõniste
1991	Estonia men's national basketball team
1992	470 sailing team Toomas Tõniste – Tõnu Tõniste
1993	Estonia men's national basketball team
1994	Estonian Nordic combined team
1995	Estonia women's epee team
1996	Estonia men's epee team
1997	Estonia decathlon team
1998	Estonia men's epee team
1999	Estonia men's epee team
2000	rally team Markko Märtin – Michael Park
2001	Estonia men's epee team
2002	Estonia women's epee team
2003	rally team Markko Märtin – Michael Park
2004	double sculls rowing team Tõnu Endrekson – Leonid Gulov
2005	quadruple sculls rowing team (Andrei Jämsa, Jüri Jaanson, Tõnu Endrekson and Leonid Gulov)
2006	quadruple sculls rowing team (Andrei Jämsa, Tõnu Endrekson, Igor Kuzmin and Allar Raja)
2007	double sculls rowing team Jüri Jaanson – Tõnu Endrekson
2008	double sculls rowing team Jüri Jaanson – Tõnu Endrekson
2009	double sculls rowing team Kaspar Taimsoo – Allar Raja
2010	Estonia men's national volleyball team
2011	Estonia national football team
2012	quadruple sculls rowing team (Andrei Jämsa, Tõnu Endrekson, Kaspar Taimsoo and Allar Raja)
2013	Estonia women's epee team (Julia Beljajeva, Irina Embrich, Erika Kirpu and Kristina Kuusk)
2014	Estonia women's epee team (Julia Beljajeva, Irina Embrich, Erika Kirpu and Kristina Kuusk)
2015	quadruple sculls rowing team (Andrei Jämsa, Tõnu Endrekson, Kaspar Taimsoo and Allar Raja)
2016	quadruple sculls rowing team (Andrei Jämsa, Tõnu Endrekson, Kaspar Taimsoo and Allar Raja)
2017	Estonia women's epee team (Julia Beljajeva, Irina Embrich, Erika Kirpu and Kristina Kuusk)
2018	rally team Ott Tänak – Martin Järveoja
2019	rally team Ott Tänak – Martin Järveoja
2021	Estonia women's epee team (Julia Beljajeva, Irina Embrich, Erika Kirpu and Katrina Lehis)
2022	rally team Ott Tänak – Martin Järveoja
2023	Estonia men's national volleyball team
2024	mixed doubles curling team Marie Kaldvee – Harri Lill

== See also ==
- Estonian Athlete of the Year
- Estonian Young Athlete of the Year
- Estonian Coach of the Year
