= Estonia at the 2004 Summer Olympics =

- IOC code: EST
- NOC: Estonian Olympic Committee
- Website: www.eok.ee (in Estonian)

in Athens
- Competitors: 42 in 10 sports
- Flag bearers: Erki Nool (opening); Jüri Jaanson (closing)
- Medals Ranked 64th: Gold 0 Silver 1 Bronze 2 Total 3

Summer Olympics appearances (overview)
- 1920; 1924; 1928; 1932; 1936; 1948–1988; 1992; 1996; 2000; 2004; 2008; 2012; 2016; 2020; 2024

Other related appearances
- Russian Empire (1908–1912); Soviet Union (1952–1988)

Estonia competed at the 2004 Summer Olympics in Athens, Greece, from 13 to 29 August 2004. This was the nation's ninth appearance at the Summer Olympics.

The Estonian Olympic Committee sent a total of 42 athletes, 31 men and 11 women, competing only in 11 different sports. Sixteen athletes had competed in Sydney, including three Olympic medalists: decathlon champion Erki Nool, and judoka and bronze medalists Aleksei Budõlin and Indrek Pertelson. Rower Jüri Jaanson participated in his fifth Olympics under two different banners (the other one with the Soviet Union) as the most experienced member of the contingent. Discus thrower Eha Rünne, aged 41, was the oldest athlete of the team, while long-distance freestyle swimmer Jelena Petrova was the youngest at age 15. Claiming the nation's first ever gold medal in athletics, Nool was appointed by the Estonian Olympic Committee to become the nation's flag bearer in the opening ceremony.

Estonia left Athens with the same number of medals (3) collected from the previous games, but failed to earn a single gold. After finishing farther from the podium in four consecutive Olympics, Jaanson ended his medal drought by taking home the silver in the men's single sculls. Two bronze medals were awarded to discus thrower Aleksander Tammert and heavyweight judoka Indrek Pertelson, who managed to repeat it from Sydney.

== Medalists ==
| Medal | Name | Sport | Event | Date |
|---|---|---|---|---|
| Silver | Jüri Jaanson | Rowing | Men's single sculls | August 21 |
| Bronze | Indrek Pertelson | Judo | Men's +100 kg | August 20 |
| Bronze | Aleksander Tammert | Athletics | Men's discus throw | August 23 |

== Athletics ==
Estonian athletes have so far achieved qualifying standards in the following athletics events (up to a maximum of 3 athletes in each event at the 'A' Standard, and 1 at the 'B' Standard).

Key

- Note–Ranks given for track events are within the athlete's heat only
- Q = Qualified for the next round
- q = Qualified for the next round as a fastest loser or, in field events, by position without achieving the qualifying target
- NR = National record
- N/A = Round not applicable for the event
- Bye = Athlete not required to compete in round

Men
Track & road events

| Athlete | Event | Heat | | Quarterfinal | | Semifinal | | Final | |
| Athlete | Event | Result | Rank | Result | Rank | Result | Rank | Result | Rank |
|---|---|---|---|---|---|---|---|---|---|
| Tarmo Jallai | 110 m hurdles | 13.77 | 6 | Did not advance | | | | | |
| Pavel Loskutov | Marathon | —N/a | | | | | | 2:18:09 | 26 |

Field events

| Athlete | Event | Qualification | | Final | |
| Athlete | Event | Distance | Position | Distance | Position |
|---|---|---|---|---|---|
| Marko Aleksejev | High jump | 2.15 | =31 | Did not advance | |
| Gerd Kanter | Discus throw | 60.05 | 19 | Did not advance | |
| Lauri Leis | Triple jump | 16.18 | 33 | Did not advance | |
| Taavi Peetre | Shot put | 19.14 | 26 | Did not advance | |
| Aleksander Tammert | Discus throw | 65.70 | 2 Q | 66.66 | 3rd place, bronze medalist(s) |
| Andrus Värnik | Javelin throw | 83.25 | 5 Q | 83.25 | 6 |

Combined events – Decathlon

| Athlete | Event | 100 m | LJ | SP | HJ | 400 m | 110H | DT | PV | JT | 1500 m | Final | Rank |
|---|---|---|---|---|---|---|---|---|---|---|---|---|---|
| Erki Nool | Result | 10.80 | 7.53 | 14.26 | 1.88 | 48.81 | 14.80 | 42.05 | 5.40 | 61.33 | 4:36.33 | 8235 | 8 |
| Erki Nool | Points | 906 | 942 | 744 | 696 | 870 | 874 | 706 | 1035 | 758 | 704 | 8235 | 8 |
| Kristjan Rahnu | Result | 10.77 | NM | 14.45 | DNS | — | — | — | — | — | — | DNF | |
| Kristjan Rahnu | Points | 912 | 0 | 756 | 0 | — | — | — | — | — | — | DNF | |
| Indrek Turi | Result | 11.08 | 6.91 | 13.62 | 2.03 | 51.67 | 14.26 | 39.83 | 4.80 | 59.34 | 4:50.01 | 7708 | 23 |
| Indrek Turi | Points | 843 | 792 | 705 | 831 | 739 | 941 | 661 | 849 | 728 | 619 | 7708 | 23 |

Women
Track & road events

| Athlete | Event | Heat | | Semifinal | | Final | |
| Athlete | Event | Result | Rank | Result | Rank | Result | Rank |
|---|---|---|---|---|---|---|---|
| Egle Uljas | 400 m | 51.91 NR | 5 q | 53.13 | 8 | Did not advance | |
| Jane Salumäe | Marathon | —N/a | | | | 2:48:47 | 44 |

Field events

| Athlete | Event | Qualification | | Final | |
| Athlete | Event | Distance | Position | Distance | Position |
|---|---|---|---|---|---|
| Moonika Aava | Javelin throw | 54.96 | 33 | Did not advance | |
| Eha Rünne | Discus throw | 54.82 | 37 | Did not advance | |

== Cycling ==
=== Road ===
| Athlete | Event | Time | Rank |
|---|---|---|---|
| Andrus Aug | Men's road race | Did not finish | |
| Jaan Kirsipuu | Men's road race | Did not finish | |
| Erki Pütsep | Men's road race | Did not finish | |
| Janek Tombak | Men's road race | 5:50:35 | 61 |
| Maaris Meier | Women's road race | Did not finish | |

=== Mountain biking ===
| Athlete | Event | Time | Rank |
|---|---|---|---|
| Sigvard Kukk | Men's cross-country | LAP (2 laps) | 41 |

== Judo ==
Estonia has qualified two judoka

| Athlete | Event | Round of 32 | Round of 16 | Quarterfinals | Semifinals | Repechage 1 | Repechage 2 | Repechage 3 | Final / BM | |
| Athlete | Event | Opposition Result | Opposition Result | Opposition Result | Opposition Result | Opposition Result | Opposition Result | Opposition Result | Opposition Result | Rank |
|---|---|---|---|---|---|---|---|---|---|---|
| Aleksei Budõlin | Men's −81 kg | Mamrikishvili (GEO); W 0110–0100 | Canto (BRA); L 0010–0011 | Did not advance | | | | | | |
| Indrek Pertelson | Men's +100 kg | Bouaichaoui (ALG); W 1010–0001 | Tangriev (UZB); W 0021–0010 | Tmenov (RUS); L 0001–1110 | Did not advance | Bye | Hernandes (BRA); W 1110–0100 | Tataroğlu (TUR); W 0200–0100 | Bianchessi (ITA); W 1000–0000 | 3rd place, bronze medalist(s) |

== Rowing ==
Men

| Athlete | Event | Heats | | Repechage | | Semifinals | | Final | |
| Athlete | Event | Time | Rank | Time | Rank | Time | Rank | Time | Rank |
|---|---|---|---|---|---|---|---|---|---|
| Jüri Jaanson | Single sculls | 7:13.74 | 1 SA/B/C | Bye | | 6:47.36 | 1 FA | 6:51.42 | 2nd place, silver medalist(s) |
| Tõnu Endrekson; Leonid Gulov | Double sculls | 6:58.80 | 3 SA/B | Bye | | 6:12.80 | 2 FA | 6:35.30 | 4 |
| Andrei Jämsä; Igor Kuzmin; Andrei Šilin; Oleg Vinogradov | Quadruple sculls | 5:45.56 | 2 SA/B | Bye | | 5:44.90 | 2 FB | 6:05.11 | 9 |

Qualification Legend: FA=Final A (medal); FB=Final B (non-medal); FC=Final C (non-medal); FD=Final D (non-medal); FE=Final E (non-medal); FF=Final F (non-medal); SA/B=Semifinals A/B; SC/D=Semifinals C/D; SE/F=Semifinals E/F; R=Repechage

== Sailing ==
Men

| Athlete | Event | Race | | | | | | | | | | | Net points | Final rank |
| Athlete | Event | 1 | 2 | 3 | 4 | 5 | 6 | 7 | 8 | 9 | 10 | M* | Net points | Final rank |
|---|---|---|---|---|---|---|---|---|---|---|---|---|---|---|
| Imre Taveter | Finn | ~~25~~ | 23 | 24 | 23 | 23 | 21 | 18 | 24 | 22 | 25 | 18 | 221 | 25 |

M = Medal race; OCS = On course side of the starting line; DSQ = Disqualified; DNF = Did not finish; DNS= Did not start; RDG = Redress given

== Shooting ==
Men

| Athlete | Event | Qualification | | Final | |
| Athlete | Event | Points | Rank | Points | Rank |
|---|---|---|---|---|---|
| Andrei Inešin | Skeet | 119 | =21 | Did not advance | |

== Swimming ==
Estonian swimmers earned qualifying standards in the following events (up to a maximum of 2 swimmers in each event at the A-standard time, and 1 at the B-standard time):

Men

| Athlete | Event | Heat | | Semifinal | | Final | |
| Athlete | Event | Time | Rank | Time | Rank | Time | Rank |
|---|---|---|---|---|---|---|---|
| Aleksander Baldin | 100 m breaststroke | 1:06.04 | 49 | Did not advance | | | |
| Aleksander Baldin | 200 m breaststroke | 2:17.90 | 32 | Did not advance | | | |
| Danil Haustov | 50 m freestyle | 23.56 | 49 | Did not advance | | | |
| Danil Haustov | 100 m freestyle | 51.02 | 37 | Did not advance | | | |

Women

| Athlete | Event | Heat | | Semifinal | | Final | |
| Athlete | Event | Time | Rank | Time | Rank | Time | Rank |
|---|---|---|---|---|---|---|---|
| Triin Aljand | 50 m freestyle | 26.19 | 26 | Did not advance | | | |
| Jana Kolukanova | 100 m freestyle | 57.45 | 37 | Did not advance | | | |
| Elina Partõka | 200 m freestyle | 2:03.54 | 28 | Did not advance | | | |
| Jelena Petrova | 800 m freestyle | 9:01.62 | 23 | —N/a | | Did not advance | |

== Tennis ==
| Athlete | Event | Round of 64 | Round of 32 | Round of 16 | Quarterfinals | Semifinals | Final / BM | |
| Athlete | Event | Opposition Score | Opposition Score | Opposition Score | Opposition Score | Opposition Score | Opposition Score | Rank |
|---|---|---|---|---|---|---|---|---|
| Kaia Kanepi | Women's singles | Cho Y-J (KOR); L 6–7^{(1–7)}, 1–6 | Did not advance | | | | | |
| Maret Ani; Kaia Kanepi | Women's doubles | —N/a | Molik / Stubbs (AUS); L 4–6, 1–6 | Did not advance | | | | |

== Triathlon ==
Estonia's first appearance in the Olympic triathlon resulted in a twenty-first-place finish for the nation's sole competitor in the sport.

| Athlete | Event | Swim (1.5 km) | Trans 1 | Bike (40 km) | Trans 2 | Run (10 km) | Total Time | Rank |
|---|---|---|---|---|---|---|---|---|
| Marko Albert | Men's | 18:01 | 0:17 | 1:01:48 | 0:19 | 35:37 | 1:55:26.59 | 21 |

== Wrestling ==
Key:

- VT - Victory by Fall.
- PP - Decision by Points - the loser with technical points.
- PO - Decision by Points - the loser without technical points.

Men's Greco-Roman

| Athlete | Event | Elimination Pool | | | | Quarterfinal | Semifinal | Final / BM | |
| Athlete | Event | Opposition Result | Opposition Result | Opposition Result | Rank | Opposition Result | Opposition Result | Opposition Result | Rank |
|---|---|---|---|---|---|---|---|---|---|
| Tarvi Thomberg | −84 kg | Metodiev (BUL); L 0–3 ^{PO} | Daragan (UKR); L 0–3 ^{PO} | Yerlikaya (TUR); L 0–3 ^{PO} | 4 | Did not advance | | | 19 |

== See also ==
- Estonia at the 2004 Summer Paralympics
