= Estonia at the 2016 Summer Olympics =

- IOC code: EST
- NOC: Estonian Olympic Committee
- Website: www.eok.ee (in Estonian)

in Rio de Janeiro
- Competitors: 45 in 13 sports
- Flag bearers: Karl-Martin Rammo (opening); Mart Seim (closing)
- Medals Ranked 78th: Gold 0 Silver 0 Bronze 1 Total 1

Summer Olympics appearances (overview)
- 1920; 1924; 1928; 1932; 1936; 1948–1988; 1992; 1996; 2000; 2004; 2008; 2012; 2016; 2020; 2024

Other related appearances
- Russian Empire (1908–1912); Soviet Union (1952–1988)

Estonia competed at the 2016 Summer Olympics in Rio de Janeiro, Brazil, from 5 to 21 August 2016. It was the nation's twelfth appearance at the Games and seventh consecutive in the post-Soviet era.

The Estonian Olympic Committee fielded a team of 45 athletes, 28 men and 17 women, across 13 sports at the Games. It was the nation's second-largest delegation sent to the Olympics, just two athletes short of the record achieved in Beijing 2008 (47). Among the sports represented by its athletes, Estonia marked its Olympic return to triathlon after being absent from London 2012, as well as weightlifting after eight decades. Athletics had the largest team by sport with only 13 competitors, roughly a third of the nation's full roster size. Apart from triathlon and weightlifting, there was also a single competitor each in archery, judo, and shooting.

Fifteen Estonian athletes competed in London, with discus thrower and 2008 champion Gerd Kanter, rowers Tõnu Endrekson and Andrei Jämsä, and épée fencer Nikolai Novosjolov headed to their fourth Games as the most experienced competitors of the team. Sisters and marathon runners Leina, Liina, and Lily Luik set a historic record for Estonia, as the first identical triplets to compete in the same event at the Games. Other notable athletes on the Estonian roster featured Greco-Roman wrestler and 2012 silver medalist Heiki Nabi in the super heavyweight category, and Laser sailor Karl-Martin Rammo, who was selected by the committee as the nation's flag bearer in the opening ceremony.

Estonia left Rio de Janeiro with only a bronze medal. It was awarded to the rowing foursome of Endrekson, Jämsä, and three-time Olympians Allar Raja and Kaspar Taimsoo in the men's quadruple sculls, rebounding from their out-of-medal position at London 2012. Several Estonian athletes advanced further to the finals of their respective sporting events, but came closest to the medal haul, including the women's épée team, discus throwers Kanter and Martin Kupper, hurdler Rasmus Mägi, and Nabi, who could not reproduce his podium feat from London after losing the bronze to Russia's Sergey Semenov.

== Medalists ==
Medal	Name	Sport	Event	Date
Bronze	Tõnu Endrekson; Andrei Jämsä; Allar Raja; Kaspar Taimsoo	Rowing	Men's quadruple sculls	11 August

== Archery ==
One Estonian archer qualified for the women's individual recurve at the Olympics by virtue of a top six national finish at the 2016 Archery World Cup meet in Antalya, Turkey.

Athlete	Event	Ranking round		Round of 64	Round of 32	Round of 16	Quarterfinals	Semifinals	Final / BM	
Athlete	Event	Score	Seed	Opposition Score	Opposition Score	Opposition Score	Opposition Score	Opposition Score	Opposition Score	Rank
Laura Nurmsalu	Women's individual	625	35	Marchenko (UKR); L 0–6	Did not advance					

== Athletics ==
Estonian athletes achieved qualifying standards in the following athletics events (up to a maximum of 3 athletes in each event):

Key

- Note–Ranks given for track events are within the athlete's heat only
- Q = Qualified for the next round
- q = Qualified for the next round as a fastest loser or, in field events, by position without achieving the qualifying target
- NR = National record
- N/A = Round not applicable for the event
- Bye = Athlete not required to compete in round
- NM = No mark

Track & road events
Men

Athlete	Event	Heat		Semifinal		Final	
Athlete	Event	Result	Rank	Result	Rank	Result	Rank
Jaak-Heinrich Jagor	400 m hurdles	49.78	4	Did not advance			
Rasmus Mägi	400 m hurdles	48.55	3 Q	48.64	4 q	48.40 NR	6
Kaur Kivistik	3000 m steeplechase	8:44.25	13	—		Did not advance	
Roman Fosti	Marathon	—				2:19:26	61
Tiidrek Nurme	Marathon	—				2:20:01	63

Women

Athlete	Event	Final	
Athlete	Event	Result	Rank
Leila Luik	Marathon	2:54:38	114
Liina Luik	Marathon	DNF	
Lily Luik	Marathon	2:48:29	97

Field events
Men

Athlete	Event	Qualification		Final	
Athlete	Event	Distance	Position	Distance	Position
Gerd Kanter	Discus throw	64.02	5 q	65.10	5
Martin Kupper	Discus throw	62.92	10 q	66.58	4
Magnus Kirt	Javelin throw	79.33	23	Did not advance	
Tanel Laanmäe	Javelin throw	80.45	18	Did not advance	
Risto Mätas	Javelin throw	79.40	22	Did not advance	

Women

Athlete	Event	Qualification		Final	
Athlete	Event	Distance	Position	Distance	Position
Ksenija Balta	Long jump	6.71	4 Q	6.79	6
Liina Laasma	Javelin throw	58.06	20	Did not advance	

Combined events – Men's decathlon

Athlete	Event	100 m	LJ	SP	HJ	400 m	110H	DT	PV	JT	1500 m	Final	Rank
Karl Robert Saluri	Result	10.82	7.02	13.88	1.77	50.32	16.51	42.96	4.50	46.42	4:39.40	7223	23
Karl Robert Saluri	Points	901	818	721	602	800	676	725	760	536	684	7223	23
Maicel Uibo	Result	11.16	7.14	NM	2.13	51.08	14.84	37.69	5.10	60.52	4:47.49	7170	24
Maicel Uibo	Points	825	847	0	925	765	869	618	941	746	634	7170	24

Combined events – Women's heptathlon

Athlete	Event	100H	HJ	SP	200 m	LJ	JT	800 m	Final	Rank
Grit Šadeiko	Result	DNF	—	—	—	—	—	—	DNF	
Grit Šadeiko	Points	0	—	—	—	—	—	—	DNF	

== Badminton ==
Estonia qualified two badminton players for each of the following events into the Olympic tournament. Remarkably going to his third Olympics, Raul Must had claimed his Olympic spot as one of top 34 individual shuttlers in the BWF World Rankings as of 5 May 2016, while Kati Tolmoff picked up one of the spare athlete berths freed by the Tripartite Commission as the next highest-ranked eligible player in the women's singles.

Athlete	Event	Group stage			Elimination	Quarterfinal	Semifinal	Final / BM	
Athlete	Event	Opposition Score	Opposition Score	Rank	Opposition Score	Opposition Score	Opposition Score	Opposition Score	Rank
Raul Must	Men's singles	Jørgensen (DEN); L (8–21, 15–21)	Leverdez (FRA); L (18–21, 21–18, 12–21)	3	Did not advance				
Kati Tolmoff	Women's singles	Intanon (THA); L (14–21, 13–21)	Yip P Y (HKG); W (5–21, 21–13, 21–19)	2	Did not advance				

== Cycling ==
=== Road ===
Estonian riders qualified for a maximum of two quota places in the men's Olympic road race by virtue of their top 15 final national ranking in the 2015 UCI Europe Tour.

Athlete	Event	Time	Rank
Tanel Kangert	Men's road race	6:11:52	9
Rein Taaramäe	Men's road race	Did not finish	

== Fencing ==
Estonian fencers qualified a full squad in the women's team épée by virtue of their top 4 national finish in the FIE Olympic Team Rankings. Nikolai Novosjolov, who competed at his fourth Olympics, secured a spot in the men's épée as one of the two highest-ranking fencers coming from the Europe zone outside the world's top eight qualifying teams in the FIE Adjusted Official Rankings.

Athlete	Event	Round of 64	Round of 32	Round of 16	Quarterfinal	Semifinal	Final / BM	
Athlete	Event	Opposition Score	Opposition Score	Opposition Score	Opposition Score	Opposition Score	Opposition Score	Rank
Nikolai Novosjolov	Men's épée	Bye	Park K-d (KOR); W 12–10	F Limardo (VEN); W 15–12	Imre (HUN); L 9–15	Did not advance		
Julia Beljajeva	Women's épée	Bye	Szász (HUN); L 11–15	Did not advance				
Irina Embrich	Women's épée	Bye	Pantelyeyeva (UKR); W 15–3	Sun Yw (CHN); L 12–15	Did not advance			
Erika Kirpu	Women's épée	Bye	Holmes (USA); W 5–4	S Besbes (TUN); L 11–15	Did not advance			
Julia Beljajeva; Irina Embrich; Erika Kirpu; Kristina Kuusk	Women's team épée	—		Bye	South Korea; W 27–26	China; L 36–45	Russia; L 31–37	4

== Judo ==
Estonia qualified one judoka for the men's half-heavyweight category (100 kg) at the Games. Grigori Minaškin earned a continental quota spot from the European region as the highest-ranked Estonian judoka outside of direct qualifying position in the IJF World Ranking List of 30 May 2016.

Athlete	Event	Round of 64	Round of 32	Round of 16	Quarterfinals	Semifinals	Repechage	Final / BM	
Athlete	Event	Opposition Result	Opposition Result	Opposition Result	Opposition Result	Opposition Result	Opposition Result	Opposition Result	Rank
Grigori Minaškin	Men's −100 kg	Bye	Rakov (KAZ); L 000–000 S	Did not advance					

== Rowing ==
Estonia qualified one boat in the men's quadruple sculls for the Olympics at the 2015 FISA World Championships in Lac d'Aiguebelette, France.

Athlete	Event	Heats		Repechage		Final	
Athlete	Event	Time	Rank	Time	Rank	Time	Rank
Tõnu Endrekson; Andrei Jämsä; Allar Raja; Kaspar Taimsoo	Men's quadruple sculls	5:51.71	1 FA	Bye		6:10.65	3rd place, bronze medalist(s)

Qualification Legend: FA=Final A (medal); FB=Final B (non-medal); FC=Final C (non-medal); FD=Final D (non-medal); FE=Final E (non-medal); FF=Final F (non-medal); SA/B=Semifinals A/B; SC/D=Semifinals C/D; SE/F=Semifinals E/F; QF=Quarterfinals; R=Repechage

== Sailing ==
Estonian sailors qualified one boat in each of the following classes through the 2014 ISAF Sailing World Championships, the individual fleet Worlds, and European qualifying regattas. The women's 49erFX crew was added to the Estonia's sailing line-up, as the nation has received a spare Olympic berth freed up by Australia, Croatia and Austria from the International Sailing Federation.

Athlete	Event	Race													Net points	Final rank
Athlete	Event	1	2	3	4	5	6	7	8	9	10	11	12	M*	Net points	Final rank
Karl-Martin Rammo	Men's Laser	24	19	17	~~44~~	30	28	36	8	2	5	—		EL	169	21
Deniss Karpak	Men's Finn	5	14	17	20	~~23~~	10	13	8	18	21	—		EL	126	20
Ingrid Puusta	Women's RS:X	~~18~~	13	12	10	8	11	9	18	7	17	14	14	EL	133	11
Anna Maria Sepp; Kätlin Tammiste	Women's 49erFX	15	17	19	~~20~~	17	18	16	18	19	20	18	17	EL	194	19

M = Medal race; EL = Eliminated – did not advance into the medal race

== Shooting ==
Estonia received an invitation from ISSF to send European Games finalist Peeter Olesk in both men's air and rapid fire pistol to the Olympics, as long as the minimum qualifying score (MQS) was fulfilled by 31 March 2016.

Athlete	Event	Qualification		Final	
Athlete	Event	Points	Rank	Points	Rank
Peeter Olesk	Men's 25 m rapid fire pistol	553	25	Did not advance	

Qualification Legend: Q = Qualify for the next round; q = Qualify for the bronze medal (shotgun)

== Swimming ==
Estonia received a Universality invitation from FINA to send two swimmers (one male and one female) to the Olympics.

Athlete	Event	Heat		Semifinal		Final	
Athlete	Event	Time	Rank	Time	Rank	Time	Rank
Martin Allikvee	Men's 200 m breaststroke	2:13.66	33	Did not advance			
Maria Romanjuk	Women's 100 m breaststroke	1:09.49	30	Did not advance			

== Triathlon ==
Estonia entered one triathlete to compete at the Games, signifying the nation's Olympic comeback to the sport after an eight-year hiatus. Kaidi Kivioja was selected as the highest-ranked triathlete from Europe in the women's event based on the ITU Points List.

Athlete	Event	Swim (1.5 km)	Trans 1	Bike (40 km)	Trans 2	Run (10 km)	Total Time	Rank
Kaidi Kivioja	Women's	20:07	0:56	1:05:53	0:39	38:05	2:05:42	44

== Weightlifting ==
Estonia qualified one male weightlifter for the Olympics by virtue of his top 15 individual finish, among those who had not secured any quota places through the World or European Championships, in the IWF World Rankings as of 20 June 2016, signifying the nation's Olympic return to the sport for the first time since 1936. The place was awarded to Mart Seim in the men's super heavyweight division (+105 kg).

Athlete	Event	Snatch		Clean & jerk		Total	Rank
Athlete	Event	Result	Rank	Result	Rank	Total	Rank
Mart Seim	Men's +105 kg	187	13	243	3	430	7

== Wrestling ==
Estonia qualified three wrestlers for each the following weight classes into the Olympic tournament. One of them had claimed an Olympic spot in the women's freestyle 75 kg at the 2015 World Championships, while two more Olympic berths were awarded to Estonian wrestlers, who progressed to the top two finals each in men's Greco-Roman 98 & 130 kg at the 2016 European Qualification Tournament.

Men's Greco-Roman

Athlete	Event	Qualification	Round of 16	Quarterfinal	Semifinal	Repechage 1	Repechage 2	Final / BM	
Athlete	Event	Opposition Result	Opposition Result	Opposition Result	Opposition Result	Opposition Result	Opposition Result	Opposition Result	Rank
Ardo Arusaar	−98 kg	Bye	Magomedov (RUS); L 0−6	Did not advance					16
Heiki Nabi	−130 kg	Bye	López (CUB); L 0−3	Did not advance		Bye	Eurén (SWE); W 3−0	Semenov (RUS); L 0−6	5

Women's freestyle

Athlete	Event	Qualification	Round of 16	Quarterfinal	Semifinal	Repechage 1	Repechage 2	Final / BM	
Athlete	Event	Opposition Result	Opposition Result	Opposition Result	Opposition Result	Opposition Result	Opposition Result	Opposition Result	Rank
Epp Mäe	−75 kg	Bye	Zhang Fl (CHN); L 4−6	Did not advance					13
