= Jaanson =

Jaanson is an Estonian-language patronymic surname, a variation of Janson, derived from the given name Jaan and the German patronymic suffix -son . Notable people with the name include:

- Jüri Jaanson
- Tatjana Jaanson
