= Matti Killing =

Estonian rowing coach

Matti Killing (born 17 March 1948 in Pärnu) is an Estonian rowing coach.

Killing graduated from the Tallinn Pedagogical Institute's Faculty of Physical Education. From 1965 until 1974, he won several medals at the Estonian Rowing Championships.

Since 1962, he has worked as a rowing coach.

Students: Marek Avamere, Kaspar Taimsoo, Allar Raja.

Awards:

- 2016: Estonian Coach of the Year
- 2018: Order of the White Star, III class.
