= Tõnu Endrekson =

Estonian rower (born 1979)

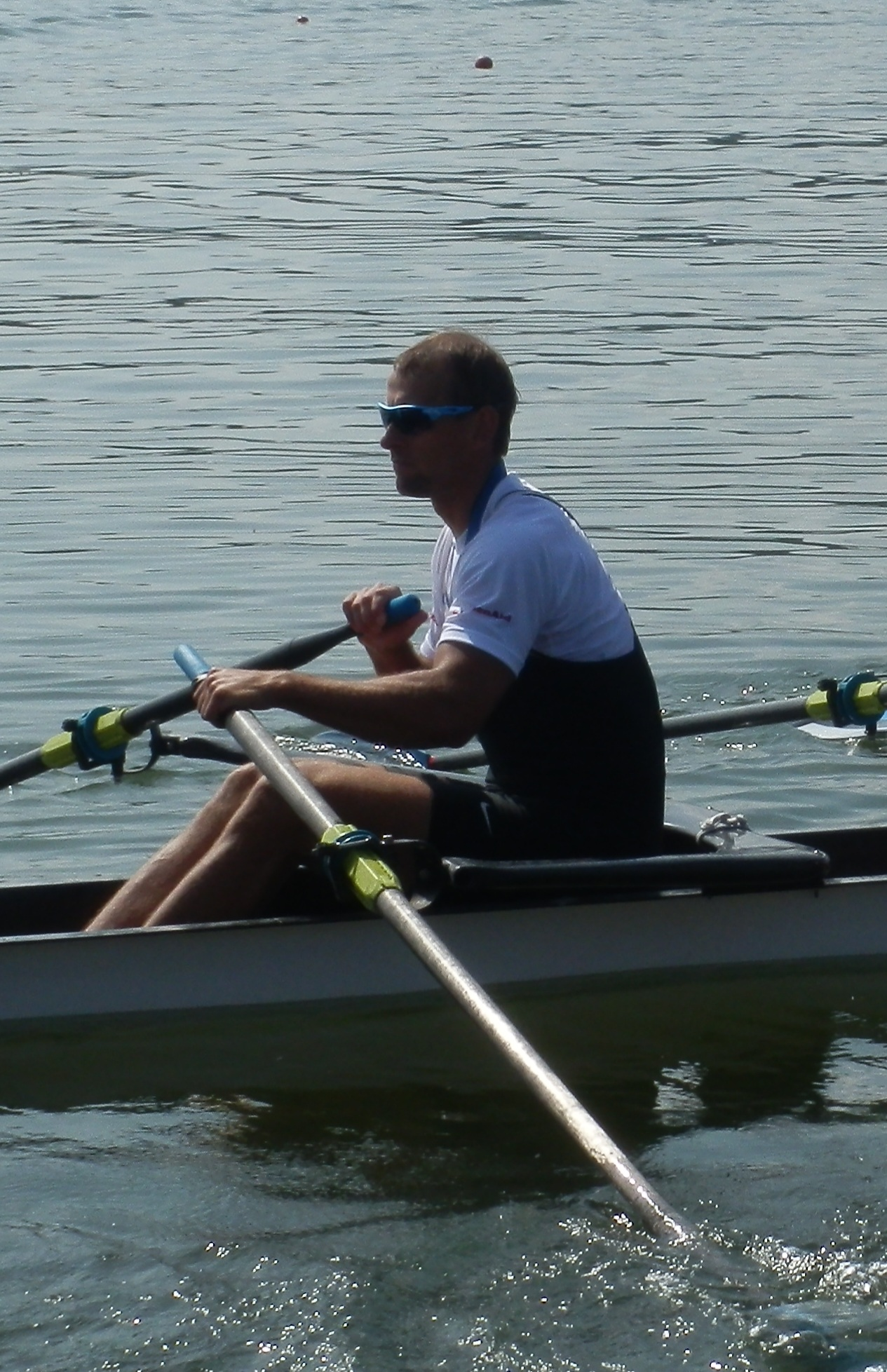

Personal information
- Nationality: Estonian
- Born: 11 June 1979 (age 47) Pärnu, Estonia
- Education: University of Tartu
- Height: 1.97 m (6 ft 6 in)
- Weight: 99 kg (218 lb)

Sport
- Sport: Rowing
- Event: M4x
- Club: Pärnu Sõudeklubi

Achievements and titles
- Olympic finals: Athens 2004 M2X; Beijing 2008 M2X; London 2012 M4X; Rio 2016 M4X; Tokyo 2020 M4X
Medal record
Men's rowing
Representing Estonia
International rowing competitions
Event	1st	2nd	3rd
Olympic Games	0	1	1
World Championships	0	0	5
European Championships	3	1	0
World U23 Championship	1	0	0
Total	4	2	6
Olympic Games
Silver medal – second place	2008 Beijing	Double sculls
Bronze medal – third place	2016 Rio de Janeiro	Quadruple sculls
World Championships
Bronze medal – third place	2005 Gifu	Quadruple sculls
Bronze medal – third place	2006 Eton	Quadruple sculls
Bronze medal – third place	2007 Munich	Double sculls
Bronze medal – third place	2015 Aiguebelette	Quadruple sculls
Bronze medal – third place	2017 Sarasota	Quadruple sculls
European Championships
Gold medal – first place	2008 Marathon	Quadruple sculls
Gold medal – first place	2012 Varese	Quadruple sculls
Gold medal – first place	2016 Brandenburg	Quadruple sculls
Silver medal – second place	2011 Plovdiv	Quadruple sculls
- Updated on 30 September 2017

Tõnu Endrekson (born 11 June 1979) is an Estonian rower. He is a five-time Olympic finalist and dual Olympic medal winner. He was fourth in the double sculls event with Leonid Gulov at the 2004 Summer Olympics in Athens and won a silver medal in 2008 Summer Olympics in Beijing in the double sculls event with Jüri Jaanson. He is a member of Pärnu Sõudeklubi (Pärnu Rowing Club), located in Pärnu.

== Junior years ==
Endrekson competed in the World Rowing Junior Championships in 1996 in the double sculls event (24th) and 1997 in the single sculls event (16th). In 2001 he won a gold medal in the World Rowing U23 Regatta (now World Rowing U23 Championships) in the double sculls event with Leonid Gulov.

== Olympic Games ==
His first appearance in the Olympic Games was in Athens 2004, where he competed in the double sculls event with Leonid Gulov. The men were third in their preliminary heat and second in semi-final thus earning a place in the Final A. They held the sixth position for the first 1500 metres, but with the strong final 500 metres they managed to clinch the fourth position. Eventually they lost the bronze medal to Italians Rossano Galtarossa and Alessio Sartori by 2,37 seconds.

In Beijing 2008 Endrekson also competed in the double sculls event but now with Estonian rowing legend Jüri Jaanson. The duo was third in their preliminary heat. In the semi-finals the men were second and assured themselves a place in the Final A. They finished second in the final just 0,05 seconds in front of the British duo Matthew Wells and Stephen Rowbotham.

At London 2012, he competed in the men's quadruple sculls with Andrei Jämsä, Allar Raja and Kaspar Taimsoo, finishing in fourth place.

== World Championships ==
Endrekson debuted in the World Rowing Championships in 2001 in Lucerne, Switzerland. He competed in the quadruple sculls event with Leonid Gulov, Andrei Šilin and Silver Sonntak. They won the Final B and earned 7th place.

2002 in Seville, Spain, he was a member of the quadruple sculls team with Andrei Šilin, Igor Kuzmin and Silver Sonntak. They won the Final B and earned 7th place.

2003 in Milan, Italy Endrekson, Gulov, Šilin and Sonntak were 7th once more.

Endrekson won his first World Championships medal in 2005 in Gifu, Japan in the quadruple sculls event with Andrei Jämsä, Leonid Gulov and Jüri Jaanson when they finished third after Poland and Slovenia.

In the 2006 World Championships held in Eton, Great Britain Endrekson was again in the bronze-winning quadruple sculls team with Jämsä, Kuzmin and Allar Raja. Gold medals went to Poland and silver medals to Ukraine.

In 2007 season Endrekson decided to compete in the double sculls with Jaanson. They won two World Cup events and were third in the World Championships in Munich, Germany, after Slovenia and France.

For the 2009 World Championships held in Poznań, Poland, Endrekson was back in the quadruple sculls team, this time together with Jämsä, Kuzmin and Vladimir Latin. The team finished 10th overall.

Endrekson competed in the 2010 World Championships in the single sculls event finishing 9th overall.

In the 2015 FISA World Rowing Championships (Lac d'Aiguebelette) he won a bronze medal in the quadruple scull with Allar Raja, Kaspar Taimsoo and Andrei Jämsä

== Achievements ==
- Olympic Games Medals: 1 Silver, 1 Bronze
- World Championship Medals: 5 Bronze
- European Championship Medals: 3 Gold, 1 Silver
- World U23 Championship Medals: 1 Gold

=== Olympic Games ===
- 2004 – 4th, Double sculls (with Leonid Gulov)
- 2008 – Silver (silver) , Double sculls (with Jüri Jaanson)
- 2012 – 4th, Quadruple sculls (with Andrei Jämsä, Allar Raja, Kaspar Taimsoo)
- 2016 – Bronze (bronze) , Quadruple sculls (with Andrei Jämsä, Allar Raja, Kaspar Taimsoo)
- 2020 – 6th, Quadruple sculls (with Jüri-Mikk Udam, Allar Raja, Kaspar Taimsoo)

=== World Rowing Championships ===
- 2001 – 7th, Quadruple sculls (with Silver Sonntak, Andrei Šilin, Leonid Gulov)
- 2002 – 7th, Quadruple sculls (with Silver Sonntak, Igor Kuzmin, Andrei Šilin)
- 2003 – 7th, Quadruple sculls (with Silver Sonntak, Andrei Šilin, Leonid Gulov)
- 2005 – Bronze (bronze) , Quadruple sculls (with Jüri Jaanson, Leonid Gulov, Andrei Jämsä)
- 2006 – Bronze (bronze) , Quadruple sculls (with Allar Raja, Igor Kuzmin, Andrei Jämsä)
- 2007 – Bronze (bronze) , Double sculls (with Jüri Jaanson)
- 2009 – 10th, Quadruple sculls (with Igor Kuzmin, Vladimir Latin, Andrei Jämsä)
- 2010 – 9th, Single sculls
- 2011 – 16th, Quadruple sculls (with Kaur Kuslap, Sten-Erik Anderson, Andrei Jämsä)
- 2014 – 16th, Double sculls (with Andrei Jämsä)
- 2015 – Bronze (bronze) , Quadruple sculls (with Andrei Jämsä, Allar Raja, Kaspar Taimsoo)
- 2017 – Bronze (bronze) , Quadruple sculls (with Kaspar Taimsoo, Allar Raja, Kaur Kuslap)

=== European Rowing Championships ===
- 2008 – Gold (gold) , Quadruple sculls (with Allar Raja, Andrei Jämsä, Jüri Jaanson)
- 2009 – 8th, Quadruple sculls (with Igor Kuzmin, Valeri Prosvirnin, Andrei Jämsä)
- 2010 – 5th, Single sculls
- 2011 – Silver (silver) , Quadruple sculls (with Andrei Jämsä, Allar Raja, Kaspar Taimsoo)
- 2012 – Gold (gold) , Quadruple sculls (with Andrei Jämsä, Allar Raja, Kaspar Taimsoo)
- 2013 – 12th, Single sculls
- 2014 – 14th, Double sculls (with Andrei Jämsä)
- 2015 – 8th, Quadruple sculls (with Allar Raja, Sten-Erik Anderson, Kaspar Taimsoo)
- 2016 – Gold (gold) , Quadruple sculls (with Andrei Jämsä, Allar Raja, Kaspar Taimsoo)

=== U23 World Rowing Championships ===
- 2001 – Gold (gold) , Double sculls (with Leonid Gulov)

=== Junior World Rowing Championships ===
- 1996 – 24th, Double sculls
- 1997 – 16th, Single sculls

== Rowing World Cup ==
Overall wins

- Quadruple sculls: 2005
- Double sculls: 2007

Tõnu Endrekson Rowing World Cup appearances
#	Date	Venue	Country	Position	Class	Crew
2000
1.	23–25 June 2000	Vienna, Austria	Austria	FB 8th	Double scull	(b) Tõnu Endrekson, (s) Jüri Jaanson
2.	14–16 July 2000	Rotsee, Lucerne	Switzerland	FB 11th	Double scull	(b) Tõnu Endrekson, (s) Silver Sonntak
2001
3.	13–15 July 2001	Oberschleissheim, Munich	Germany	H3	Double scull	(b) Tõnu Endrekson, (s) Silver Sonntak
2002
4.	14–16 June 2002	Hazewinkel	Belgium	FA 5th	Quad scull	(b) Silver Sonntak, Igor Kuzmin, Andrei Šilin, (s) Tõnu Endrekson
5.	1–3 August 2002	Rotsee, Lucerne	Switzerland	FA 4th	Quad scull	(b) Silver Sonntak, Igor Kuzmin, Andrei Šilin, (s) Tõnu Endrekson
2003
6.	29–31 May 2003	Idroscalo, Milan	Italy	FB 11th	Quad scull	(b) Tõnu Endrekson, Silver Sonntak, Andrei Šilin, (s) Igor Kuzmin
7.	11–13 July 2003	Rotsee, Lucerne	Switzerland	FA 6th	Quad scull	(b) Silver Sonntak, Andrei Šilin, Leonid Gulov, (s) Tõnu Endrekson
2004
8.	7–9 May 2004	Lake Malta, Poznań	Poland	FA 2nd	Double scull	(b) Leonid Gulov, (s) Tõnu Endrekson
9.	27–29 May 2004	Oberschleissheim, Munich	Germany	FA 6th	Double scull	(b) Leonid Gulov, (s) Tõnu Endrekson
10.	18–20 June 2004	Rotsee, Lucerne	Switzerland	FA 5th	Double scull	(b) Leonid Gulov, (s) Tõnu Endrekson
2005
11.	26–28 May 2005	Dorney Lake, Dorney	(United Kingdom) Great Britain	FA 1st	Quad scull	(b) Jüri Jaanson, Leonid Gulov, Tõnu Endrekson, (s) Andrei Jämsä
12.	8–10 July 2005	Rotsee, Lucerne	Switzerland	FA 1st	Quad scull	(b) Jüri Jaanson, Leonid Gulov, Tõnu Endrekson, (s) Andrei Jämsä
2006
13.	25–27 May 2006	Oberschleissheim, Munich	Germany	FB 11th	Double scull	(b) Tõnu Endrekson, (s) Andrei Jämsä
14.	15–17 June 2006	Lake Malta, Poznań	Poland	FB 7th	Double scull	(b) Tõnu Endrekson, (s) Andrei Jämsä
15.	7–9 July 2006	Rotsee, Lucerne	Switzerland	FA 5th	Quad scull	(b) Jüri Jaanson, Leonid Gulov, Tõnu Endrekson, (s) Andrei Jämsä
2007
16.	1–3 June 2007	Danube, Linz / Ottensheim	Austria	FA 5th	Double scull	(b) Tõnu Endrekson, (s) Jüri Jaanson
17.	22–24 June 2007	Bosbaan, Amsterdam	Netherlands	FA 1st	Double scull	(b) Tõnu Endrekson, (s) Jüri Jaanson
18.	13–15 July 2007	Rotsee, Lucerne	Switzerland	FA 1st	Double scull	(b) Tõnu Endrekson, (s) Jüri Jaanson
2008
19.	20–22 June 2008	Lake Malta, Poznań	Poland	FA 3rd	Double scull	(b) Tõnu Endrekson, (s) Jüri Jaanson
2010
20.	28–30 May 2010	Lake Bled, Bled	Slovenia	H4	Single scull	Tõnu Endrekson
21.	18–20 June 2010	Oberschleissheim, Munich	Germany	FC 16th	Double scull	(b) Tõnu Endrekson, (s) Andrei Jämsä
22.	9–11 July 2010	Rotsee, Lucerne	Switzerland	FC 15th	Double scull	(b) Andrei Jämsä, (s) Tõnu Endrekson
2011
23.	27–29 May 2011	Oberschleissheim, Munich	Germany	FD 19th	Single scull	Tõnu Endrekson
24.	8–10 July 2011	Rotsee, Lucerne	Switzerland	FB 11th	Quad scull	(b) Joosep Laos, Vladimir Latin, Tõnu Endrekson, (s) Andrei Jämsä
2012
25.	4–6 May 2012	Sava, Belgrade	Serbia	FA 3rd	Quad scull	(b) Andrei Jämsä, Allar Raja, Tõnu Endrekson, (s) Kaspar Taimsoo
26.	25–27 May 2012	Rotsee, Lucerne	Switzerland	FA 4th	Quad scull	(b) Andrei Jämsä, Allar Raja, Tõnu Endrekson, (s) Kaspar Taimsoo
27.	15–17 June 2012	Oberschleissheim, Munich	Germany	FA 6th	Quad scull	(b) Andrei Jämsä, Allar Raja, Tõnu Endrekson, (s) Kaspar Taimsoo
2014
28.	20–22 June 2014	Lac d'Aiguebelette, Aiguebelette	France	FB 11th	Double scull	(b) Andrei Jämsä, (s) Tõnu Endrekson
29.	11–13 July 2014	Rotsee, Lucerne	Switzerland	FD 19th	Double scull	(b) Andrei Jämsä, (s) Tõnu Endrekson
2015
30.	9–10 May 2015	Lake Bled, Bled	Slovenia	FB 7th	Quad scull	(b) Allar Raja, Sten-Erik Anderson, Tõnu Endrekson, (s) Kaspar Taimsoo
31.	10–12 July 2015	Rotsee, Lucerne	Switzerland	FA 3rd	Quad scull	(b) Andrei Jämsä, Allar Raja, Tõnu Endrekson, (s) Kaspar Taimsoo
2016
32.	15–17 April 2016	Lake Varese, Varese	Italy	FA 4th	Quad scull	(b) Andrei Jämsä, Allar Raja, Tõnu Endrekson, (s) Kaspar Taimsoo

== Orders ==
Order of the White Star, 2nd Class: 2009

Olympic Games
Preceded by Karl-Martin Rammo	Flagbearer for Estonia (with Dina Ellermann); Tokyo 2020	Succeeded by Incumbent
