= Silver Sonntak =

Estonian rower

Silver Sonntak (born 11 November 1976) is an Estonian rower. He was born in Pärnu.

He started his rowing training in 1991, coached by Mihkel Leppik and Tatjana Jaanson. He graduated from Tallinn University of Applied Sciences in 2000, with a degree in automotive technology.

He has won the Estonian championships 29 times. In 2004 he was a reserve competitor for the Estonian rowing team at the 2004 Summer Olympics in Athens.

In 2002 he was chosen as the Estonian Rowing Association's best male rower (Estonian: Sõudeliidu parim meessõudja).
