= Allar Raja =

Estonian rower

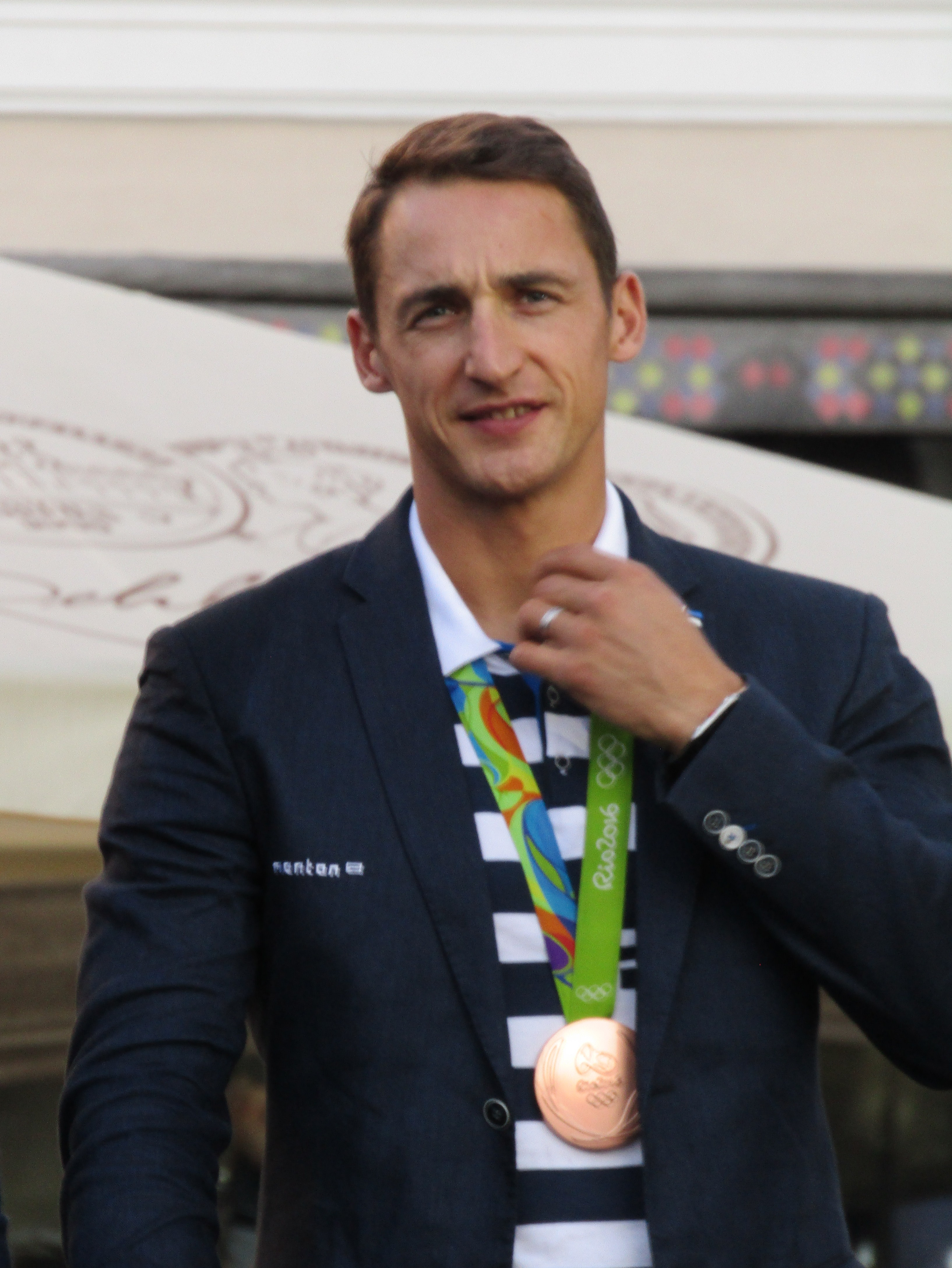
- Allar Raja with his 2016 Olympic bronze medal

Personal information
- Nationality: Estonian
- Born: 22 June 1983 (age 43) Sindi, Estonia
- Height: 1.89 m (6 ft 2 in)
- Weight: 80 kg (176 lb)

Sport
- Sport: Rowing
- Events: M2x, M4x
- Club: Pärnu Sõudekeskus Kalev

Achievements and titles
- Olympic finals: London 2012 M4x; Rio 2016 M4x; Tokyo 2020 M4x
Medal record
Men's rowing
Representing Estonia
International rowing competitions
Event	1st	2nd	3rd
Olympic Games	0	0	1
World Championships	0	0	4
European Championships	4	2	1
Total	4	2	6
World Rowing Cup race podiums
Event	1st	2nd	3rd
Double sculls	0	1	3
Quadruple sculls	1	2	4
Total	1	3	7
Olympic Games
Bronze medal – third place	2016 Rio de Janeiro	Quadruple sculls
World Championships
Bronze medal – third place	2006 Eton	Quadruple sculls
Bronze medal – third place	2009 Poznań	Double sculls
Bronze medal – third place	2015 Aiguebelette	Quadruple sculls
Bronze medal – third place	2017 Sarasota	Quadruple sculls
European Championships
Gold medal – first place	2008 Marathon	Quadruple sculls
Gold medal – first place	2009 Brest	Double sculls
Gold medal – first place	2012 Varese	Quadruple sculls
Gold medal – first place	2016 Brandenburg	Quadruple sculls
Silver medal – second place	2010 Montemor-o-Velho	Double sculls
Silver medal – second place	2011 Plovdiv	Quadruple sculls
Bronze medal – third place	2021 Varese	Quadruple sculls
- Updated on 27 September 2022

Allar Raja (born 22 June 1983) is an Estonian rower. He is a member of rowing club SK Kalev located in Pärnu.

== Rowing career ==
=== 2000–2008 ===
Raja competed in the World Rowing Junior Championships in 2000 in the quadruple sculls event (19th) and in 2001 in the double sculls event (13th). In 2004 he competed in the U-23 World Regatta in the single sculls event achieving 8th position.

His first appearance in the World Rowing Championships was in 2005 in Gifu, Japan in the double sculls event with Silver Sonntak. They were second in Final C, achieving 14th position overall. Raja won his first World Championships medal in 2006 in Eton, Great Britain, where he was a member of the bronze-winning quadruple sculls team with Andrei Jämsä, Tõnu Endrekson and Igor Kuzmin. 2007 in Munich, Germany he competed in the quadruple sculls event with Kuzmin, Latin and Taimsoo earning 8th position. The same team was 5th at the 2007 European Rowing Championships held in Poznań, Poland. At the 2008 European Rowing Championships in Marathon, Greece he won a gold medal in the quadruple sculls event with Jüri Jaanson, Tõnu Endrekson and Andrei Jämsä.

Allar Raja made his first appearance at the Olympics in Beijing 2008 competing in the quadruple sculls event with Igor Kuzmin, Vladimir Latin and Kaspar Taimsoo. The men were 4th in their preliminary heat and won the repechage. In the semifinals they finished fourth and did not get to Final A. The final place was 9th as they finished third in Final B.

=== 2009–2012 ===
Raja won his second World Championships bronze medal in Poznań in 2009, where he competed in the double sculls event with Kaspar Taimsoo. Raja and Taimsoo finished 8th at the 2010 World Rowing Championships held at Lake Karapiro, New Zealand. The same crew finished 7th at the 2011 World Rowing Championships.

At the 2009 European Championships, held in Brest, Belarus, Raja won his second European title. This time in the double sculls event with Kaspar Taimsoo. The same crew finished second at the 2010 European Championships. For the 2011 European Championships Raja and Taimsoo formed a new quad scull team with Tõnu Endrekson and Andrei Jämsä. The crew finished second after Russia and won the silver medals. The same crew finished won a gold medal at the 2012 European Championships.

At the 2012 Summer Olympics, held in London, Raja also represented Estonia in the quadruple sculls event. This time with Kaspar Taimsoo, Tõnu Endrekson and Andrei Jämsä. The crew finished second in their preliminary heat and also in the semifinal, thus earning a place in Final A. In the final they finished just outside the medals in 4th place behind crews from Germany, Croatia and Australia, respectively.

=== 2013–2016 ===
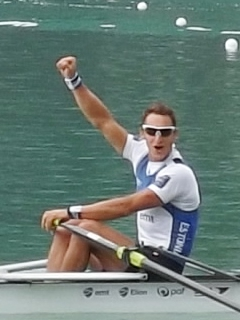
Raja celebrating bronze medal at the 2015 World Championships.

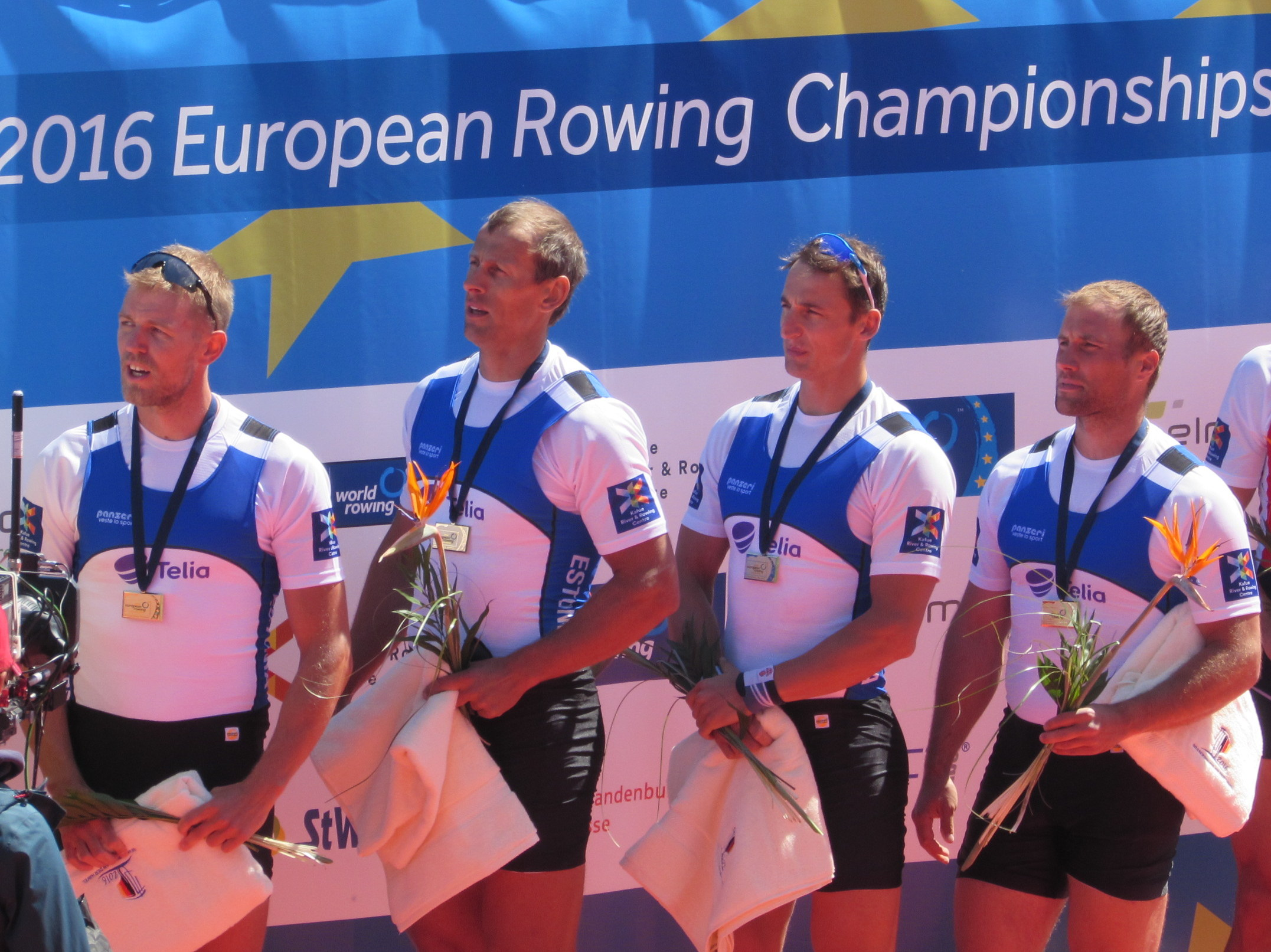
Raja (second from right) with teammates at the podium of the 2016 European Championships

In summer of 2013 Raja and Taimsoo formed a new quadruple scull crew with young prospects Sten-Erik Anderson and Kaur Kuslap. They also finished 5th at the 2013 World Rowing Championships held at Tangeum Lake, Chungju in South Korea. The same team repeated their 5th place at the 2014 World Rowing Championships held in Amsterdam. At the 2013 European Championships, held in Seville, Spain Raja competed in the double sculls event with Kaspar Taimsoo. The result was a disappointment as the men did not reach Final A and finished in 7th place overall.

In the summer of 2015 Raja and Taimsoo reunited with Tõnu Endrekson and Andrei Jämsä in preparation for the 2016 Olympic Games. The crew went on to win a bronze medal at the 2015 World Rowing Championships held in France. In the spring of 2016 they also won a gold medal at the 2016 European Championships. At the 2016 Summer Olympics, held in Rio de Janeiro, Taimsoo made his third olympic appearance in the quadruple sculls event, with Raja, Endrekson and Jämsä. The crew won their preliminary heat, thus earning a place in Final A. In the final they finished third winning the bronze medals, behind crews from Germany and Australia, respectively.

== Achievements ==
- Olympic Games Medals: 1 Bronze
- World Championship Medals: 4 Bronze
- European Championship Medals: 4 Gold, 2 Silver, 1 Bronze

=== Olympic Games ===
- 2008 – 9th, Quadruple sculls (with Kaspar Taimsoo, Igor Kuzmin, Vladimir Latin)
- 2012 – 4th, Quadruple sculls (with Kaspar Taimsoo, Tõnu Endrekson, Andrei Jämsä)
- 2016 – Bronze (bronze) , Quadruple sculls (with Kaspar Taimsoo, Tõnu Endrekson, Andrei Jämsä)
- 2020 – 6th, Quadruple sculls (with Kaspar Taimsoo, Tõnu Endrekson, Jüri-Mikk Udam)

=== World Rowing Championships ===
- 2005 – 14th, Double sculls (with Silver Sonntak)
- 2006 – Bronze (bronze) , Quadruple sculls (with Andrei Jämsä, Tõnu Endrekson, Igor Kuzmin)
- 2007 – 8th, Quadruple sculls (with Kaspar Taimsoo, Igor Kuzmin, Vladimir Latin)
- 2009 – Bronze (bronze) , Double sculls (Kaspar Taimsoo)
- 2010 – 8th, Double sculls (with Kaspar Taimsoo)
- 2011 – 7th, Double sculls (with Kaspar Taimsoo)
- 2013 – 5th, Quadruple sculls (with Allar Raja, Sten-Erik Anderson, Kaur Kuslap)
- 2014 – 5th, Quadruple sculls (with Allar Raja, Sten-Erik Anderson, Kaur Kuslap)
- 2015 – Bronze (bronze) , Quadruple sculls (with Kaspar Taimsoo, Tõnu Endrekson, Andrei Jämsä)
- 2017 – Bronze (bronze) , Quadruple sculls (with Kaspar Taimsoo, Tõnu Endrekson, Kaur Kuslap)
- 2019 – 12th, Quadruple sculls (with Kaspar Taimsoo, Tõnu Endrekson, Kaur Kuslap)
- 2022 – 5th, Quadruple sculls (with Mikhail Kushteyn, Tõnu Endrekson, Johann Poolak)

=== European Rowing Championships ===
- 2007 – 5th, Quadruple sculls (with Kaspar Taimsoo, Igor Kuzmin, Vladimir Latin)
- 2008 – Gold (gold) , Quadruple sculls (with Jüri Jaanson, Tõnu Endrekson, Andrei Jämsä)
- 2009 – Gold (gold) , Double sculls (with Kaspar Taimsoo)
- 2010 – Silver (silver) , Double sculls (with Kaspar Taimsoo)
- 2011 – Silver (silver) , Quadruple sculls (with Kaspar Taimsoo, Tõnu Endrekson, Andrei Jämsä)
- 2012 – Gold (gold) , Quadruple sculls (with Kaspar Taimsoo, Tõnu Endrekson, Andrei Jämsä)
- 2013 – 7th, Double sculls (with Kaspar Taimsoo)
- 2014 – 6th, Quadruple sculls (with Kaspar Taimsoo, Sten-Erik Anderson, Kaur Kuslap)
- 2015 – 8th, Quadruple sculls (with Kaspar Taimsoo, Sten-Erik Anderson, Tõnu Endrekson)
- 2016 – Gold (gold) , Quadruple sculls (with Kaspar Taimsoo, Tõnu Endrekson, Andrei Jämsä)
- 2017 – 7th, Quadruple sculls (with Kaspar Taimsoo, Sten-Erik Anderson, Kaur Kuslap)
- 2018 – 9th, Quadruple sculls (with Kaspar Taimsoo, Sten-Erik Anderson, Kaur Kuslap)
- 2019 – 15th, Double sculls (with Kaur Kuslap)
- 2020 – 4th, Quadruple sculls (with Kaspar Taimsoo, Tõnu Endrekson, Jüri-Mikk Udam)
- 2021 – Bronze (bronze) , Quadruple sculls (with Kaspar Taimsoo, Tõnu Endrekson, Jüri-Mikk Udam)
- 2022 – 5th, Quadruple sculls (with Mikhail Kushteyn, Tõnu Endrekson, Johann Poolak)

=== U23 World Rowing Championships ===
- 2004 – 8th, Single sculls

=== Junior World Rowing Championships ===
- 2000 – 19th, Quadruple sculls
- 2001 – 13th, Double sculls

=== Henley Royal Regatta ===
- 2008 – Queen Mother Challenge Cup

== Rowing World Cup ==
Allar Raja Rowing World Cup appearances
#	Date	Venue	Country	Result	Event	Crew
2004
1.	7–9 May 2004	Lake Malta, Poznań	Poland	FE 27th	Single scull	Allar Raja
2.	18–20 June 2004	Rotsee, Lucerne	Switzerland	FB 12th	Double scull	(b) Allar Raja, (s) Silver Sonntak
2005
3.	26–28 May 2005	Dorney Lake, Eton	(United Kingdom) Great Britain	FB 9th	Double scull	(b) Allar Raja, (s) Silver Sonntak
4.	8–10 July 2005	Rotsee, Lucerne	Switzerland	FC 14th	Double scull	(b) Allar Raja, (s) Silver Sonntak
2006
5.	25–27 May 2006	Oberschleissheim, Munich	Germany	FB 7th	Double scull	(b) Allar Raja, (s) Igor Kuzmin
6.	7–9 July 2006	Rotsee, Lucerne	Switzerland	FA 6th	Double scull	(b) Allar Raja, (s) Igor Kuzmin
2007
7.	1–3 June 2007	Danube, Linz / Ottensheim	Austria	FA 3rd (bronze)	Double scull	(b) Allar Raja, (s) Igor Kuzmin
8.	22–24 June 2007	Bosbaan, Amsterdam	Netherlands	FE 25th	Single scull	Allar Raja
9.	13–15 July 2007	Rotsee, Lucerne	Switzerland	FB 11th	Quad scull	(b) Kaspar Taimsoo, Vladimir Latin, Igor Kuzmin, (s) Allar Raja
2008
10.	8–11 May 2008	Oberschleissheim, Munich	Germany	FB 7th	Quad scull	(b) Kaspar Taimsoo, Vladimir Latin, Igor Kuzmin, (s) Allar Raja
11.	20–22 June 2008	Lake Malta, Poznań	Poland	FB 7th	Quad scull	(b) Kaspar Taimsoo, Vladimir Latin, Igor Kuzmin, (s) Allar Raja
2009
12.	19–21 June 2009	Oberschleissheim, Munich	Germany	FA 5th	Double scull	(b) Kaspar Taimsoo, (s) Allar Raja
13.	10–12 July 2009	Rotsee, Lucerne	Switzerland	FA 3rd (bronze)	Double scull	(b) Allar Raja, (s) Kaspar Taimsoo
2010
14.	28–30 May 2010	Lake Bled, Bled	Slovenia	FA 3rd (bronze)	Double scull	(b) Allar Raja, (s) Kaspar Taimsoo
15.	9–11 July 2010	Rotsee, Lucerne	Switzerland	FA 4th	Double scull	(b) Allar Raja, (s) Kaspar Taimsoo
2011
16.	27–29 May 2011	Oberschleissheim, Munich	Germany	FA 4th	Double scull	(b) Allar Raja, (s) Kaspar Taimsoo
17.	17–19 June 2011	Allermöhe, Hamburg	Germany	FA 4th	Double scull	(b) Allar Raja, (s) Kaspar Taimsoo
18.	8–10 July 2011	Rotsee, Lucerne	Switzerland	FA 6th	Double scull	(b) Allar Raja, (s) Kaspar Taimsoo
2012
19.	4–6 May 2012	Sava, Belgrade	Serbia	FA 3rd (bronze)	Quad scull	(b) Andrei Jämsä, Allar Raja, Tõnu Endrekson, (s) Kaspar Taimsoo
20.	25–27 May 2012	Rotsee, Lucerne	Switzerland	FA 4th	Quad scull	(b) Andrei Jämsä, Allar Raja, Tõnu Endrekson, (s) Kaspar Taimsoo
21.	15–17 June 2012	Oberschleissheim, Munich	Germany	FA 6th	Quad scull	(b) Andrei Jämsä, Allar Raja, Tõnu Endrekson, (s) Kaspar Taimsoo
2013
22.	22–24 March 2013	Penrith, Sydney	Australia	FA 2nd (silver)	Double scull	(b) Allar Raja, (s) Kaspar Taimsoo
23.	21–23 June 2013	Dorney Lake, Eton	(United Kingdom) Great Britain	FA 3rd (bronze)	Quad scull	(b) Kaur Kuslap, Allar Raja, Sten-Erik Anderson, (s) Kaspar Taimsoo
24.	12–14 July 2013	Rotsee, Lucerne	Switzerland	FA 3rd (bronze)	Quad scull	(b) Kaur Kuslap, Allar Raja, Sten-Erik Anderson, (s) Kaspar Taimsoo
2014
25.	20–22 June 2014	Lac d'Aiguebelette, Aiguebelette	France	FA 5th	Quad scull	(b) Allar Raja, Kaspar Taimsoo, Sten-Erik Anderson, (s) Kaur Kuslap
26.	11–13 July 2014	Rotsee, Lucerne	Switzerland	FA 2nd (silver)	Quad scull	(b) Kaur Kuslap, Allar Raja, Sten-Erik Anderson, (s) Kaspar Taimsoo
2015
27.	9–10 May 2015	Lake Bled, Bled	Slovenia	FB 7th	Quad scull	(b) Allar Raja, Sten-Erik Anderson, Tõnu Endrekson, (s) Kaspar Taimsoo
28.	10–12 July 2015	Rotsee, Lucerne	Switzerland	FA 3rd (bronze)	Quad scull	(b) Andrei Jämsä, Allar Raja, Tõnu Endrekson, (s) Kaspar Taimsoo
2016
29.	15–17 April 2016	Lake Varese, Varese	Italy	FA 4th	Quad scull	(b) Andrei Jämsä, Allar Raja, Tõnu Endrekson, (s) Kaspar Taimsoo
30.	17–19 June 2016	Lake Malta, Poznań	Poland	R1 DNS	Quad scull	(b) Andrei Jämsä, Allar Raja, Tõnu Endrekson, (s) Kaspar Taimsoo
2017
31.	5–7 May 2017	Sava, Belgrade	Serbia	FB 7th	Double scull	(b) Allar Raja, (s) Tõnu Endrekson
32.	7–9 July 2017	Rotsee, Lucerne	Switzerland	FB 10th	Quad scull	(b) Allar Raja, Sten-Erik Anderson, Tõnu Endrekson, (s) Kaspar Taimsoo
2018
33.	1–3 June 2018	Sava, Belgrade	Serbia	FB 7th	Quad scull	(b) Andrei Jämsä, Allar Raja, Tõnu Endrekson, (s) Kaur Kuslap
34.	13–15 July 2018	Rotsee, Lucerne	Switzerland	FB 9th	Quad scull	(b) Andrei Jämsä, Allar Raja, Tõnu Endrekson, (s) Kaur Kuslap
2019
35.	12–14 July 2019	Willem-Alexander Baan, Rotterdam	Netherlands	FB 10th	Quad scull	(b) Allar Raja, Sten-Erik Anderson, Tõnu Endrekson, (s) Kaspar Taimsoo
2021
36.	30 April–1 May 2021	Lake Jarun, Zagreb	Croatia	FA 1st (gold)	Quad scull	(b) Jüri-Mikk Udam, Allar Raja, Tõnu Endrekson, (s) Kaspar Taimsoo
2022
37.	16–19 June 2022	Lake Malta, Poznań	Poland	FA 2nd (silver)	Quad scull	(b) Mikhail Kushteyn, Allar Raja, Tõnu Endrekson, (s) Johann Poolak
38.	8–10 July 2022	Rotsee, Lucerne	Switzerland	FB 7th	Quad scull	(b) Mikhail Kushteyn, Allar Raja, Tõnu Endrekson, (s) Johann Poolak
