= Aleksandr Latin =

Estonian triathlete

Aleksandr Latin (born 25 October 1986) is an Estonian triathlete.

He was born in Narva. His older brother is rower Vladimir Latin. In 2009 he graduated from University of Tartu in environmental technology speciality, and 2018 Tallinn University of Technology in engineering sciences.

1997-2005 he focused on swimming, coached by Sergei Izotov. He won medals at Estonian swimming championships.

Since 2006 he is focused on triathlon, coached by Jüri Käen. He placed 4th at 2015 European Games. He is multiple-times Estonian champion in triathlon.

In 2015 he was named Best Male Triathlete of Estonia.
