= Sten-Erik Anderson =

Estonian rower (born 1991)

Sten-Erik Anderson (born 30 January 1991) is an Estonian rower.

He was born in Pärnu.

He has exercised rowing since 2003, coached by Reet Palm and Matti Killing. He has won Estonian championships 23 times. In 2016 he was a reserve competitor for Estonian rowing team in 2016 Summer Olympics in Rio de Janeiro.

In 2009 he was chosen Estonian Rowing Association's best junior rower (Estonian: Sõudeliidu parim noorsõudja).
