= Kaspar Taimsoo =

Estonian rower

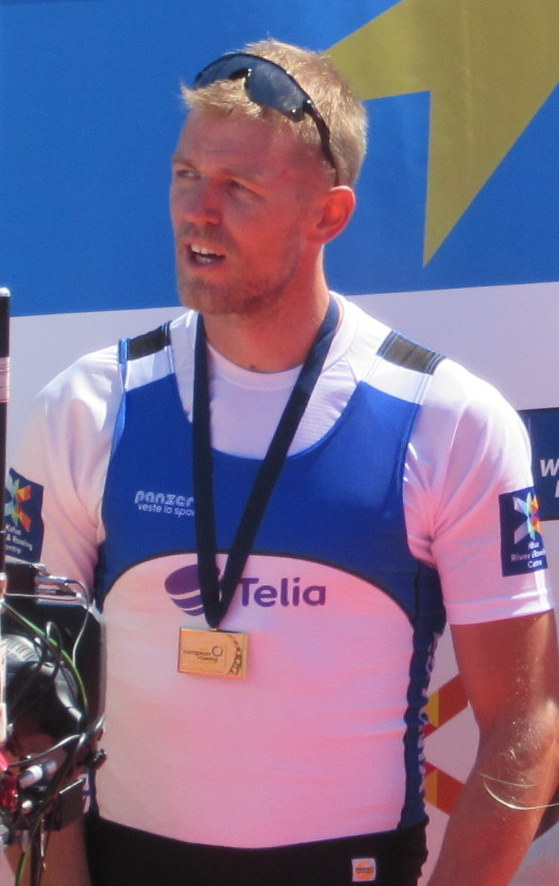
- Taimsoo at the 2016 European Championships

Personal information
- Nationality: Estonian
- Born: 30 April 1987 (age 39) Viljandi, then part of Estonian SSR, Soviet Union
- Height: 1.93 m (6 ft 4 in)
- Weight: 82 kg (181 lb)

Sport
- Sport: Rowing
- Events: M2x, M4x
- Club: Viljandi Rowing Club

Achievements and titles
- Olympic finals: London 2012 M4X; Rio 2016 M4X; Tokyo 2020 M4X
Medal record
Men's rowing
Representing Estonia
Event	1st	2nd	3rd
Olympic Games	0	0	1
World Championships	0	0	3
European Championships	3	3	1
Total	3	3	5
Olympic Games
Bronze medal – third place	2016 Rio de Janeiro	Quadruple sculls
World Championships
Bronze medal – third place	2009 Poznań	Double sculls
Bronze medal – third place	2015 Aiguebelette	Quadruple sculls
Bronze medal – third place	2017 Sarasota	Quadruple sculls
European Championships
Gold medal – first place	2009 Brest	Double sculls
Gold medal – first place	2012 Varese	Quadruple sculls
Gold medal – first place	2016 Brandenburg	Quadruple sculls
Silver medal – second place	2008 Marathon	Double sculls
Silver medal – second place	2010 Montemor-o-Velho	Double sculls
Silver medal – second place	2011 Plovdiv	Quadruple sculls
Bronze medal – third place	2021 Varese	Quadruple sculls
- Updated on 13 April 2021

Kaspar Taimsoo (born 30 April 1987) is an Estonian rower. He is a four time Olympian and three time European champion. He is a member of Viljandi Rowing Club (Estonian: Viljandi Sõudeklubi).

== Rowing career ==
=== 2004–2008 ===
Taimsoo made his first international appearance in the Junior World Championships in 2004 achieving 14th position in the double sculls event. In 2005 he won a bronze medal in the single sculls event at the Junior World Championships. His first appearance at the World Rowing Championships was in 2007 in Munich, Germany, where he competed in the quadruple sculls event with Allar Raja, Igor Kuzmin and Vladimir Latin finishing on 8th position. The same team achieved 5th place at the 2007 European Rowing Championships held in Poznań, Poland.

Taimsoo made his first appearance at the Olympic Games in Beijing 2008 competing in the quadruple sculls event with Raja, Kuzmin and Latin. The men were 4th in their preliminary heat and won the repechage. In the semifinals they finished fourth and did not get to Final A. Their final place was 9th as they finished third in Final B. The same team also won the Queen Mother Challenge Cup at the Henley Royal Regatta. In September 2008 Taimsoo won his first European Championships medal, a silver, in the double sculls event with Vladimir Latin.

=== 2009–2012 ===
In 2009 Taimsoo won his first World Championships medal, a bronze, competing in the double sculls event with Allar Raja in Poznań. The same duo also won the gold medal at the 2009 European Rowing Championships, held in Brest, Belarus. Raja and Taimsoo finished 8th at the 2010 World Rowing Championships held at Lake Karapiro, New Zealand. The same crew finished second at the 2010 European Championships. Taimsoo and Raja finished 7th at the 2011 World Rowing Championships. For the 2011 European Championships Taimsoo and Raja formed a new quad scull team with Tõnu Endrekson and Andrei Jämsä. The crew finished second after Russia and won the silver medals.

At the 2012 Summer Olympics, held in London, Taimsoo made his second olympic appearance in the quadruple sculls event. This time with Raja, Endrekson and Jämsä. The crew finished second in their preliminary heat and also in the semifinal, thus earning a place in Final A. In the final they finished just outside the medals in 4th place behind crews from Germany, Croatia and Australia, respectively. The same quadruple sculls crew won a gold medal at the 2012 European Championships.

=== 2013–2016 ===
The 2013 season started off with a good result as Taimsoo and Raja won a silver medal at the World Cup event held in Sydney, Australia. The 2013 European Championships, held in Seville, Spain was a disappointment as the men did not reach Final A and finished in 7th place overall.

In the summer of 2013 Taimsoo and Raja formed a new quadruple scull crew with young prospects Sten-Erik Anderson and Kaur Kuslap. The new crew had an immediate success winning bronze medals at the World Cup events held at Eaton and Lucerne. They also finished 5th at the 2013 World Rowing Championships held at Tangeum Lake, Chungju in South Korea. The same team repeated their 5th place at the 2014 World Rowing Championships held in Amsterdam.

In the summer of 2015 Taimsoo and Raja reunited with Tõnu Endrekson and Andrei Jämsä in preparation for the 2016 Olympic Games. The crew went on to win a bronze medal at the 2015 World Rowing Championships held in France. In the spring of 2016 they also won a gold medal at the 2016 European Championships. At the 2016 Summer Olympics, held in Rio de Janeiro, Taimsoo made his third olympic appearance in the quadruple sculls event, with Raja, Endrekson and Jämsä. The crew won their preliminary heat, thus earning a place in Final A. In the final they finished third winning the bronze medals, behind crews from Germany and Australia, respectively.

== Achievements ==
- Olympic Games Medals: 1 Bronze
- World Championship Medals: 3 Bronze
- European Championship Medals: 3 Gold, 3 Silver, 1 Bronze
- Junior World Championship Medals: 1 Bronze

=== Olympic Games ===
- 2008 – 9th, Quadruple sculls (with Allar Raja, Igor Kuzmin, Vladimir Latin)
- 2012 – 4th, Quadruple sculls (with Allar Raja, Tõnu Endrekson, Andrei Jämsä)
- 2016 – Bronze (bronze) , Quadruple sculls (with Allar Raja, Tõnu Endrekson, Andrei Jämsä)

=== World Rowing Championships ===
- 2007 – 8th, Quadruple sculls (with Allar Raja, Igor Kuzmin, Vladimir Latin)
- 2009 – Bronze (bronze) , Double sculls (with Allar Raja)
- 2010 – 8th, Double sculls (with Allar Raja)
- 2011 – 7th, Double sculls (with Allar Raja)
- 2013 – 5th, Quadruple sculls (with Allar Raja, Sten-Erik Anderson, Kaur Kuslap)
- 2014 – 5th, Quadruple sculls (with Allar Raja, Sten-Erik Anderson, Kaur Kuslap)
- 2015 – Bronze (bronze) , Quadruple sculls (with Allar Raja, Tõnu Endrekson, Andrei Jämsä)
- 2017 – Bronze (bronze) , Quadruple sculls (with Allar Raja, Tõnu Endrekson, Kaur Kuslap)
- 2019 – 12th, Quadruple sculls (with Allar Raja, Tõnu Endrekson, Kaur Kuslap)

=== European Rowing Championships ===
- 2007 – 5th, Quadruple sculls (with Allar Raja, Igor Kuzmin, Vladimir Latin)
- 2008 – Silver (silver) , Double sculls (with Vladimir Latin)
- 2009 – Gold (gold) , Double sculls (with Allar Raja)
- 2010 – Silver (silver) , Double sculls (with Allar Raja)
- 2011 – Silver (silver) , Quadruple sculls (with Allar Raja, Tõnu Endrekson, Andrei Jämsä)
- 2012 – Gold (gold) , Quadruple sculls (with Allar Raja, Tõnu Endrekson, Andrei Jämsä)
- 2013 – 7th, Double sculls (with Allar Raja)
- 2014 – 6th, Quadruple sculls (with Allar Raja, Sten-Erik Anderson, Kaur Kuslap)
- 2015 – 8th, Quadruple sculls (with Allar Raja, Sten-Erik Anderson, Tõnu Endrekson)
- 2016 – Gold (gold) , Quadruple sculls (with Allar Raja, Tõnu Endrekson, Andrei Jämsä)
- 2017 – 7th, Quadruple sculls (with Allar Raja, Sten-Erik Anderson, Kaur Kuslap)
- 2018 – 9th, Quadruple sculls (with Allar Raja, Sten-Erik Anderson, Kaur Kuslap)
- 2019 – 8th, Quadruple sculls (with Tõnu Endrekson, Sten-Erik Anderson, Jüri-Mikk Udam)
- 2020 – 4th, Quadruple sculls (with Allar Raja, Tõnu Endrekson, Jüri-Mikk Udam)
- 2021 – Bronze (bronze) , Quadruple sculls (with Allar Raja, Tõnu Endrekson, Jüri-Mikk Udam)

=== Junior World Rowing Championships ===
- 2004 – 14th, Double sculls (with Alo Kuslap)
- 2005 – Bronze (bronze) , Single sculls

=== Henley Royal Regatta ===
- 2008 – Queen Mother Challenge Cup

== Rowing World Cup ==
Kaspar Taimsoo Rowing World Cup appearances
#	Date	Venue	Country	Result	Class	Crew
2007
1.	1–3 June 2007	Danube, Linz / Ottensheim	Austria	FD 22nd	Double scull	(b) Vladimir Latin, (s) Kaspar Taimsoo
2.	13–15 July 2007	Rotsee, Lucerne	Switzerland	FB 11th	Quad scull	(b) Kaspar Taimsoo, Vladimir Latin, Igor Kuzmin, (s) Allar Raja
2008
3.	8–11 May 2008	Oberschleissheim, Munich	Germany	FB 7th	Quad scull	(b) Kaspar Taimsoo, Vladimir Latin, Igor Kuzmin, (s) Allar Raja
4.	20–22 June 2008	Lake Malta, Poznań	Poland	FB 7th	Quad scull	(b) Kaspar Taimsoo, Vladimir Latin, Igor Kuzmin, (s) Allar Raja
2009
5.	19–21 June 2009	Oberschleissheim, Munich	Germany	FA 5th	Double scull	(b) Kaspar Taimsoo, (s) Allar Raja
6.	10–12 July 2009	Rotsee, Lucerne	Switzerland	FA 3rd (bronze)	Double scull	(b) Allar Raja, (s) Kaspar Taimsoo
2010
7.	28–30 May 2010	Lake Bled, Bled	Slovenia	FA 3rd (bronze)	Double scull	(b) Allar Raja, (s) Kaspar Taimsoo
8.	9–11 July 2010	Rotsee, Lucerne	Switzerland	FA 4th	Double scull	(b) Allar Raja, (s) Kaspar Taimsoo
2011
9.	27–29 May 2011	Oberschleissheim, Munich	Germany	FA 4th	Double scull	(b) Allar Raja, (s) Kaspar Taimsoo
10.	17–19 June 2011	Allermöhe, Hamburg	Germany	FA 4th	Double scull	(b) Allar Raja, (s) Kaspar Taimsoo
11.	8–10 July 2011	Rotsee, Lucerne	Switzerland	FA 6th	Double scull	(b) Allar Raja, (s) Kaspar Taimsoo
2012
12.	4–6 May 2012	Sava, Belgrade	Serbia	FA 3rd (bronze)	Quad scull	(b) Andrei Jämsä, Allar Raja, Tõnu Endrekson, (s) Kaspar Taimsoo
13.	25–27 May 2012	Rotsee, Lucerne	Switzerland	FA 4th	Quad scull	(b) Andrei Jämsä, Allar Raja, Tõnu Endrekson, (s) Kaspar Taimsoo
14.	15–17 June 2012	Oberschleissheim, Munich	Germany	FA 6th	Quad scull	(b) Andrei Jämsä, Allar Raja, Tõnu Endrekson, (s) Kaspar Taimsoo
2013
15.	22–24 March 2013	Penrith, Sydney	Australia	FA 2nd (silver)	Double scull	(b) Allar Raja, (s) Kaspar Taimsoo
16.	21–23 June 2013	Dorney Lake, Eton	(United Kingdom) Great Britain	FA 3rd (bronze)	Quad scull	(b) Kaur Kuslap, Allar Raja, Sten-Erik Anderson, (s) Kaspar Taimsoo
17.	12–14 July 2013	Rotsee, Lucerne	Switzerland	FA 3rd (bronze)	Quad scull	(b) Kaur Kuslap, Allar Raja, Sten-Erik Anderson, (s) Kaspar Taimsoo
2014
18.	20–22 June 2014	Lac d'Aiguebelette, Aiguebelette	France	FA 5th	Quad scull	(b) Allar Raja, Kaspar Taimsoo, Sten-Erik Anderson, (s) Kaur Kuslap
19.	11–13 July 2014	Rotsee, Lucerne	Switzerland	FA 2nd (silver)	Quad scull	(b) Kaur Kuslap, Allar Raja, Sten-Erik Anderson, (s) Kaspar Taimsoo
2015
20.	9–10 May 2015	Lake Bled, Bled	Slovenia	FB 7th	Quad scull	(b) Allar Raja, Sten-Erik Anderson, Tõnu Endrekson, (s) Kaspar Taimsoo
21.	10–12 July 2015	Rotsee, Lucerne	Switzerland	FA 3rd (bronze)	Quad scull	(b) Andrei Jämsä, Allar Raja, Tõnu Endrekson, (s) Kaspar Taimsoo
2016
22.	15–17 April 2016	Lake Varese, Varese	Italy	FA 4th	Quad scull	(b) Andrei Jämsä, Allar Raja, Tõnu Endrekson, (s) Kaspar Taimsoo
23.	17–19 June 2016	Lake Malta, Poznań	Poland	R1 DNS	Quad scull	(b) Andrei Jämsä, Allar Raja, Tõnu Endrekson, (s) Kaspar Taimsoo
