= Valeri Prosvirnin =

Russian-Estonian rower

Valeri Prosvirnin (born 26 May 1986) is an Estonian rower.

He was born in Rostov-on-Don, Russia. In 2010 he graduated from Estonian Academy of Security Sciences.

He started his rowing exercising in 1995, coached by his father. He has competed at European Rowing Championships, best place 7th in quadruple sculls (2011). He is 7-times Estonian champion in different rowing disciplines.

In 2006 he was named as Best Surprise of the Year of Estonian Rowing Association.
