= Tatjana Jaanson =

Estonian rower and politician

Tatjana Jaanson (before 1991; Borissova; born on 23 November 1966 in Moscow) is a Russian-born Estonian rower and politician. She was a member of XII Riigikogu.

In 2008, she was awarded with Order of the White Star, IV class. She was married to Estonian rower and politician Jüri Jaanson.
