= Andrei Jämsä =

Estonian rower (born 1982)

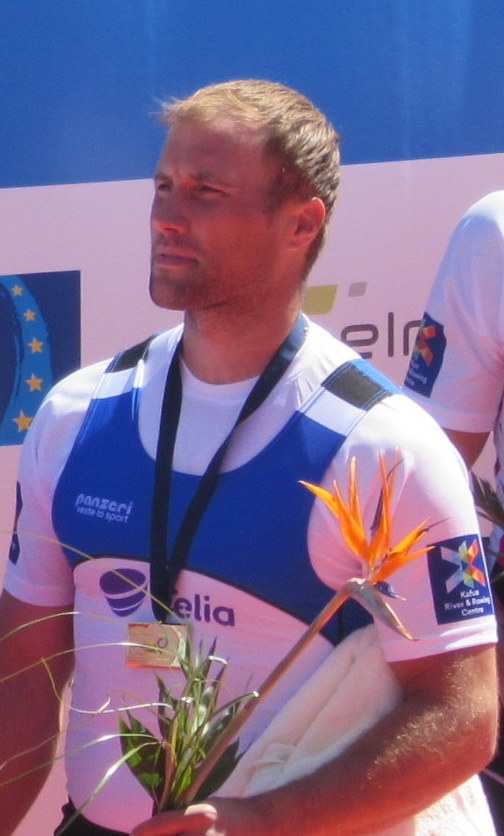
- Jämsä (right) at the podium of the 2016 European Championships

Personal information
- Nationality: Estonian
- Born: 14 February 1982 (age 44) Pärnu, Estonia
- Height: 1.85 m (6 ft 1 in)
- Weight: 95 kg (209 lb; 15.0 st)

Sport
- Sport: Rowing
- Event: M4x
- Club: Pärnu Sõudeklubi
Medal record
Olympic Games
Bronze medal – third place	2016 Rio de Janeiro	Quadruple sculls
World Championships
Bronze medal – third place	2005 Gifu	Quadruple Sculls
Bronze medal – third place	2006 Eton	Quadruple Sculls
Bronze medal – third place	2015 Aiguebelette	Quadruple Sculls
European Championships
Gold medal – first place	2008 Marathon	Quadruple Sculls
Gold medal – first place	2012 Varese	Quadruple Sculls
Gold medal – first place	2016 Brandenburg	Quadruple Sculls
Silver medal – second place	2011 Plovdiv	Quadruple Sculls
- Updated on 9 May 2016

Andrei Jämsä (born 14 February 1982) is an Estonian rower. Due to a back injury he could not compete in 2007. He is a member of rowing club Pärnu Sõudeklubi (Pärnu Rowing Club) located in Pärnu.

== Junior years ==
Jämsä was born in Pärnu. He competed in the U-23 world Regatta in the double sculls event in 2002 with Igor Kuzmin, earning 7th position and in 2003 with Oleg Vinogradov earning 4th position.

== Olympic Games ==
His first appearance in the Olympic Games was in Athens 2004, where he competed in the quadruple sculls event with Andrei Šilin, Kuzmin and Vinogradov earning 9th position overall.

In Beijing 2008 Jämsä competed in the single sculls event earning 17th position overall.

At the 2012 Summer Olympics, he again competed in the men's quadruple sculls with Tõnu Endrekson, Allar Raja and Kaspar Taimsoo. The team finished 4th.

== World championships ==
Jämsä's debut in the World Rowing Championships took place in Milan, Italy in 2003, where he competed in the double sculls event with Kuzmin earning 9th position overall.

Jämsä won his first World Championships medal in 2005 in Gifu, Japan in the quadruple sculls event with Tõnu Endrekson, Leonid Gulov and Jüri Jaanson when they finished third after Poland and Slovenia.

In the 2006 World Championships held in Eton, Great Britain Jämsä was again the strokesman in the bronze-winning quadruple sculls team with Endrekson, Kuzmin and Allar Raja. Gold medals went to Poland and silver medals to Ukraine.

== Rowing World Cup ==
Overall wins

- Quadruple sculls: 2005

Andrei Jämsä Rowing World Cup appearances
#	Date	Venue	Country	Position	Class	Crew
2004
1.	7–9 May 2004	Lake Malta, Poznań	Poland	FA 4th	Quad scull	(b) Oleg Vinogradov, Igor Kuzmin, Andrei Šilin (s) Andrei Jämsä
2.	27–29 May 2004	Oberschleissheim, Munich	Germany	FA 2nd	Quad scull	(b) Oleg Vinogradov, Igor Kuzmin, Andrei Šilin (s) Andrei Jämsä
3.	18–20 June 2004	Rotsee, Lucerne	Switzerland	FB 10th	Quad scull	(b) Oleg Vinogradov, Igor Kuzmin, Andrei Šilin (s) Andrei Jämsä
2005
4.	26–28 May 2005	Dorney Lake, Dorney	(United Kingdom) Great Britain	FA 1st	Quad scull	(b) Jüri Jaanson, Leonid Gulov, Tõnu Endrekson, (s) Andrei Jämsä
5.	8–10 July 2005	Rotsee, Lucerne	Switzerland	FA 1st	Quad scull	(b) Jüri Jaanson, Leonid Gulov, Tõnu Endrekson, (s) Andrei Jämsä
2006
6.	25–27 May 2006	Oberschleissheim, Munich	Germany	FB 11th	Double scull	(b) Tõnu Endrekson, (s) Andrei Jämsä
7.	15–17 June 2006	Lake Malta, Poznań	Poland	FB 7th	Double scull	(b) Tõnu Endrekson, (s) Andrei Jämsä
8.	7–9 July 2006	Rotsee, Lucerne	Switzerland	FA 5th	Quad scull	(b) Jüri Jaanson, Leonid Gulov, Tõnu Endrekson, (s) Andrei Jämsä
2009
9.	18–20 June 2009	Oberschleissheim, Munich	Germany	FD 20th	Single scull	Andrei Jämsä
10.	10–12 July 2009	Rotsee, Lucerne	Switzerland	FB 8th	Quad scull	(b) Valeri Prosvirnin, Vladimir Latin, Igor Kuzmin, (s) Andrei Jämsä
2010
11.	28–30 May 2010	Lake Bled, Bled	Slovenia	FD 19th	Single scull	Andrei Jämsä
12.	18–20 June 2010	Oberschleissheim, Munich	Germany	FC 16th	Double scull	(b) Tõnu Endrekson, (s) Andrei Jämsä
13.	9–11 July 2010	Rotsee, Lucerne	Switzerland	FC 15th	Double scull	(b) Andrei Jämsä, (s) Tõnu Endrekson
2011
14.	27–29 May 2011	Oberschleissheim, Munich	Germany	H2	Double scull	(b) Andrei Jämsä, (s) Igor Kuzmin
15.	8–10 July 2011	Rotsee, Lucerne	Switzerland	FB 11th	Quad scull	(b) Joosep Laos, Vladimir Latin, Tõnu Endrekson, (s) Andrei Jämsä
2012
16.	4–6 May 2012	Sava, Belgrade	Serbia	FA 3rd	Quad scull	(b) Andrei Jämsä, Allar Raja, Tõnu Endrekson, (s) Kaspar Taimsoo
17.	25–27 May 2012	Rotsee, Lucerne	Switzerland	FA 4th	Quad scull	(b) Andrei Jämsä, Allar Raja, Tõnu Endrekson, (s) Kaspar Taimsoo
18.	15–17 June 2012	Oberschleissheim, Munich	Germany	FA 6th	Quad scull	(b) Andrei Jämsä, Allar Raja, Tõnu Endrekson, (s) Kaspar Taimsoo
2014
19.	20–22 June 2014	Lac d'Aiguebelette, Aiguebelette	France	FB 11th	Double scull	(b) Andrei Jämsä, (s) Tõnu Endrekson
20.	11–13 July 2014	Rotsee, Lucerne	Switzerland	FD 19th	Double scull	(b) Andrei Jämsä, (s) Tõnu Endrekson
2015
21.	9–10 May 2015	Lake Bled, Bled	Slovenia	FB 7th	Quad scull	(b) Allar Raja, Sten-Erik Anderson, Tõnu Endrekson, (s) Kaspar Taimsoo
22.	10–12 July 2015	Rotsee, Lucerne	Switzerland	FA 3rd	Quad scull	(b) Andrei Jämsä, Allar Raja, Tõnu Endrekson, (s) Kaspar Taimsoo
2016
23.	15–17 April 2016	Lake Varese, Varese	Italy	FA 4th	Quad scull	(b) Andrei Jämsä, Allar Raja, Tõnu Endrekson, (s) Kaspar Taimsoo
