= Kaur Kuslap =

Estonian rower

Kaur Kuslap (born 26 January 1990) is an Estonian rower.

He was born in Viljandi.

He started his rowing training in 2002, coached by Ruth Vaar.

He has won the Estonian championships 14 times. In 2012 he was a reserve competitor for Estonian rower team in 2012 Summer Olympics in London.

In 2002 he was chosen as Estonian Rowing Association's best junior rower (Estonian: Sõudeliidu parim noorsõudja).
