= Leonid Gulov =

Estonian rower

Personal information
- Born: September 29, 1981 (age 44)
Medal record
Representing Estonia
Men's rowing
World Rowing Championships
Bronze medal – third place	2005 Gifu	Quadruple sculls
U23 World Championships
Gold medal – first place	2000 Copenhagen	Double sculls
Gold medal – first place	2001 Linz	Double sculls
Junior World Championships
Gold medal – first place	1998 Linz	Single sculls
Gold medal – first place	1999 Plovdiv	Single sculls

Leonid Gulov (born September 29, 1981) is a retired Estonian rower. He was fourth in the double sculls event with Tõnu Endrekson at the 2004 Summer Olympics in Athens. He is a member of rowing club "SK Narva Energia" located in Narva.

== Junior years ==
Gulov was born in Narva. His first appearance in the World Rowing Junior Championships was in 1997 in the quadruple sculls event (23rd). In 1998 and 1999 he won the Junior Championships gold medals in the single sculls event. In 2000 he won the gold medal in the U-23 World Regatta in the double sculls event with Andrei Šilin. He repeated the world title in 2001 competing with Tõnu Endrekson.

== Olympic Games ==
His Olympic Games debut took place in Sydney 2000, where he competed in the double sculls event with Andrei Šilin and they achieved 9th position overall.

His second appearance in the Olympic Games was in Athens 2004, where he competed in the double sculls event with Tõnu Endrekson. The men were third in their preliminary heat and second in semi-final thus earning a place in the Final A. They held the sixth position for the first 1500 metres, but with the strong final 500 metres they managed to clinch the fourth position. Eventually they lost the bronze medal to Italians Rossano Galtarossa and Alessio Sartori by 2.37 seconds.

== World championships ==
Gulov debuted in the World Rowing Championships in 1999 in St. Catharines, Canada where he competed with Šilin and they were second in the Final B earning 8th place.

2001 in Lucerne, Switzerland he competed in the quadruple sculls event with Endrekson, Šilin and Silver Sonntak. They won the Final B and earned 7th place.

2003 in Milan, Italy he was a member of the quadruple sculls team with Endrekson, Šilin and Sonntak. They won the Final B and earned 7th place.

Gulov won his first World Championships medal in 2005 in Gifu, Japan in the quadruple sculls event with Andrei Jämsä, Endrekson and Jüri Jaanson when they finished third after Poland and Slovenia.

2006 in Eton, Great Britain he competed in the double sculls event with Vladimir Latin (20th).

2007 in Munich, Germany he decided to participate in the single sculls event, but the result was a disappointment when he finished 24th.

== Rowing World Cup ==
Overall wins

- Quadruple sculls: 2005

Year	Event	Position	Class
2001	New Jersey, USA	5th	Double Sculls
2001	Munich, Germany	9th	Single Sculls
2003	Milan, Italy	18th	Single Sculls
2003	Lucerne, Switzerland	6th	Quadruple Sculls
2004	Poznan, Poland	2nd	Double Sculls
2004	Munich, Germany	6th	Double Sculls
2004	Lucerne, Switzerland	5th	Double Sculls
2005	Eton, Great Britain	1st	Quadruple Sculls
2005	Lucerne, Switzerland	1st	Quadruple Sculls
2006	Poznan, Poland	12th	Single Sculls
2006	Lucerne, Switzerland	5th	Quadruple Sculls
2007	Linz, Austria	11th	Single Sculls
2007	Lucerne, Switzerland	9th	Single Sculls
2008	Munich, Germany	12th	Single Sculls
2008	Poznan, Poland	7th	Quadruple Sculls
