= Andrei Šilin =

Estonian rower

Personal information
- Nationality: Estonian
- Born: 28 August 1978 (age 47) Narva, then part of Estonian SSR, Soviet Union

Sport
- Sport: Rowing

Andrei Šilin (born 28 August 1978) is an Estonian rower. He competed at the 2000 Summer Olympics and the 2004 Summer Olympics.
