= Estonian Rowing Association =

Sports governing body in Estonia

Estonian Rowing Association (abbreviation ERA; Estonian: Eesti Sõudeliit) is one of the sport governing bodies in Estonia which deals with rowing.

ERA is re-established on 8 December 1989, being a legal successor of Estonian Rowing Federation, which was established on 28 July 1938. ERA is a member of World Rowing Federation (FISA).
