= Igor Kuzmin =

Estonian rower (born 1982)

Personal information
- Born: 23 November 1982 (age 43)
Medal record
Representing Estonia
Men's rowing
World Rowing Championships
Bronze medal – third place	2006 Eton	Quadruple sculls

Igor Kuzmin (born 23 November 1982) is an Estonian rower. He is a member of rowing club SK Narva Energia located in Narva.

== Junior years ==
Kuzmin was born in Narva. In 2000 Kuzmin competed in the World Rowing Junior Championships in the single sculls event, finishing in 12th position. In 2002 he competed in the U-23 World Regatta with Andrei Jämsä in the double sculls event, finishing in 7th position.

== Olympic Games ==
His first appearance in the Olympic Games was in Athens 2004, where he competed in the quadruple sculls event with Andrei Jämsä, Andrei Šilin and Oleg Vinogradov earning 9th position overall.

Kuzmin's second appearance at the Olympics was in Beijing 2008 where he competed in the quadruple sculls event with Allar Raja, Vladimir Latin and Kaspar Taimsoo. The men were 4th in their preliminary heat and won the repechage. In the semifinals they finished fourth and did not get to Final A. The final place was 9th as they finished third in Final B.

== World championships ==
Kuzmin debuted in the World Rowing Championships in 2002 in Seville, Spain, he was a member of the quadruple sculls team with Tõnu Endrekson, Andrei Šilin, and Silver Sonntak. They won the Final B and earned 7th place.

2003 in Milan, Italy he competed in the double sculls event with Jämsä, earning 9th position overall.

Kuzmin won his first World Championships medal in 2006 in Eton, Great Britain in the quadruple sculls event with Jämsä, Endrekson and Allar Raja.

2007 in Munich, Germany he competed in the quadruple sculls event with Raja, Vladimir Latin and Kaspar Taimsoo earning 8th position.

2009 in Poznań, Poland he was again a part of the Estonia's quadruple sculls team, this time together with Andrei Jämsä, Tõnu Endrekson and Vladimir Latin. The team achieved 10th position overall.

== European Championships ==
2007 in Poznań, Poland he competed in the quadruple sculls event with Raja, Latin and Taimsoo earning 5th position.

2009 in Brest, Belarus he was a member of the quadruple sculls team with Valeri Prosvirin, Tõnu Endrekson and Andrei Jämsä. They earned 8th place.

2010 in Montemor-o-Velho, Portugal Kuzmin, Prosvirin, Jämsä and Latin were 8th once more.

== Rowing World Cup ==
Year	Event	Position	Class
2002	Hazewinkel, Belgium	5th	Quadruple Sculls
2002	Lucerne, Switzerland	4th	Quadruple Sculls
2003	Milan, Italy	11th	Quadruple Sculls
2003	Munich, Germany	13th	Double Sculls
2004	Poznań, Poland	4th	Quadruple Sculls
2004	Munich, Germany	2nd	Quadruple Sculls
2004	Lucerne, Switzerland	10th	Quadruple Sculls
2005	Eton, Great Britain	23rd	Single Sculls
2005	Munich, Germany	13th	Double Sculls
2006	Munich, Germany	7th	Double Sculls
2006	Lucerne, Switzerland	6th	Double Sculls
2007	Linz, Austria	3rd	Double Sculls
2007	Lucerne, Switzerland	11th	Quadruple Sculls
2008	Munich, Germany	7th	Quadruple Sculls
2008	Poznań, Poland	7th	Quadruple Sculls
2009	Munich, Germany	10th	Double Sculls
2009	Lucerne, Switzerland	8th	Quadruple Sculls
2010	Bled, Slovenia	14th	Single Sculls
2010	Lucerne, Switzerland	18th	Single Sculls

== Henley Royal Regatta ==
- 2008 – Queen Mother Challenge Cup
