= Vladimir Latin =

Estonian rower

Personal information
- Born: 30 May 1985 (age 41) Narva, then part of Estonian SSR, Soviet Union
Medal record
Men's rowing
Representing Estonia
European Championships
Silver medal – second place	2008 Athens	Double Sculls
U23 World Championships
Bronze medal – third place	2005 Amsterdam	Double Sculls

Vladimir Latin (born 30 May 1985 in Narva) is an Estonian rower. He is a member of rowing club "SK Narva Energia" located in Narva. He finished 9th in the men's quadruple sculls at the 2008 Summer Olympics. His younger brother is triathlete Aleksandr Latin.

== Rowing World Cup ==
Year	Event	Position	Class
2005	Lucerne, Switzerland	22nd	Double Sculls
2006	Munich, Germany	20th	Double Sculls
2007	Linz, Austria	22nd	Double Sculls
2007	Lucerne, Switzerland	11th	Quadruple Sculls
2008	Munich, Germany	7th	Quadruple Sculls
2008	Poznan, Poland	7th	Quadruple Sculls
2009	Munich, Germany	10th	Double Sculls
2009	Lucerne, Switzerland	8th	Quadruple Sculls
2010	Bled, Slovenia	11th	Double Sculls
