= Jüri Jaanson =

Estonian rower and politician

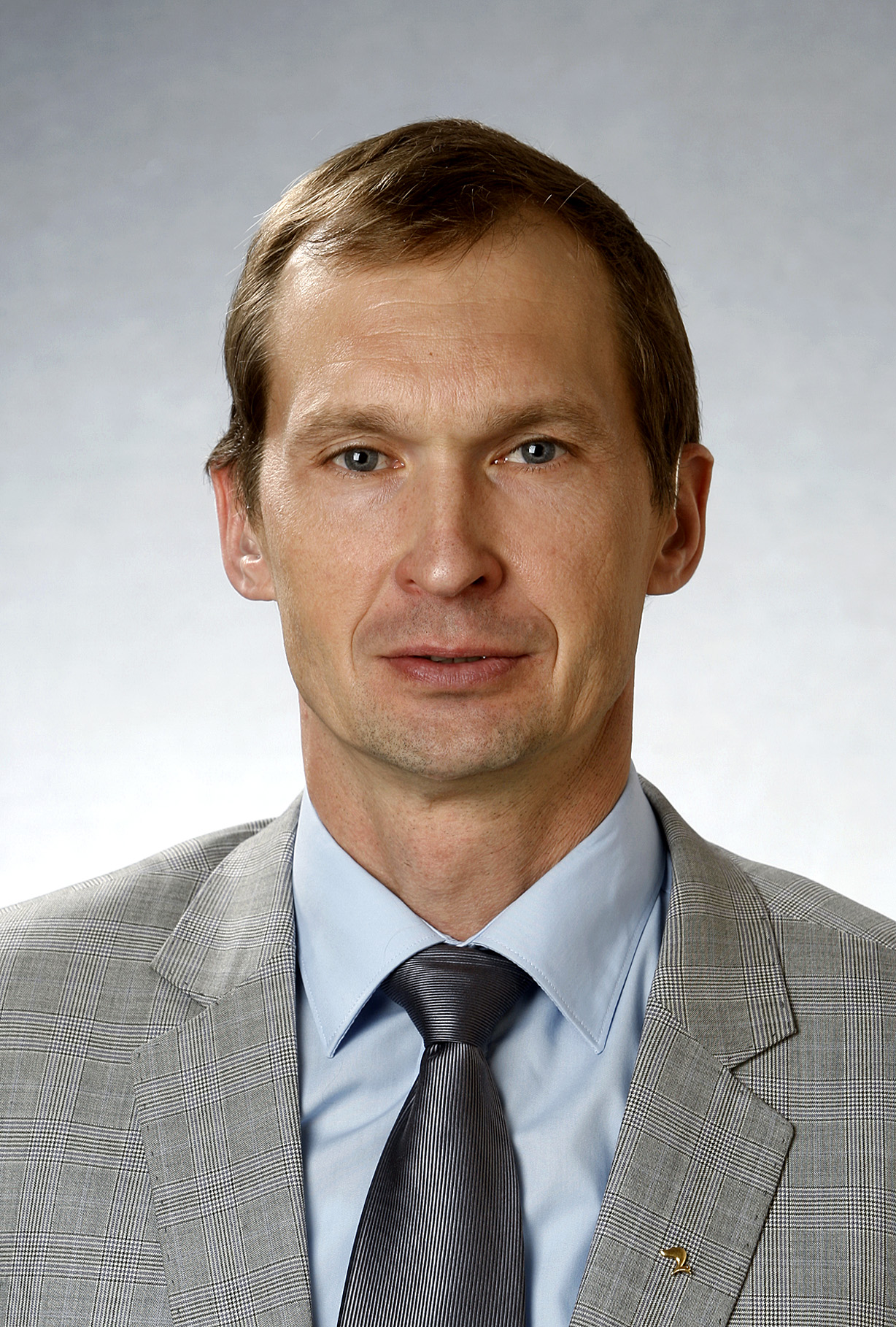
- Jaanson in 2011

Personal information
- Nationality: Estonian
- Born: 14 October 1965 (age 60) Tartu, then part of Estonian SSR, Soviet Union
- Height: 1.92 m (6 ft 4 in)
- Weight: 94 kg (207 lb)

Sport
- Sport: Rowing
- Events: M1x, M2x, M4x
- Club: Pärnu Sõudeklubi
Medal record
Men's rowing
International rowing competitions
Event	1st	2nd	3rd
Olympic Games	0	2	0
World Championships	1	1	3
European Championships	1	0	0
Total	2	3	3
Olympic Games
Representing Estonia
Silver medal – second place	2004 Athens	Single Sculls
Silver medal – second place	2008 Beijing	Double Sculls
World Championships
Representing Soviet Union
Gold medal – first place	1990 Tasmania	Single Sculls
Bronze medal – third place	1989 Bled	Single Sculls
Representing Estonia
Silver medal – second place	1995 Tampere	Single Sculls
Bronze medal – third place	2005 Gifu	Quadruple Sculls
Bronze medal – third place	2007 Munich	Double Sculls
European Championships
Gold medal – first place	2008 Marathon	Quadruple Sculls

Jüri Jaanson (born 14 October 1965) is the most successful Estonian rower of all time and the winner of five medals at World Rowing Championships.

== Biography ==
Jaanson was born in Tartu, and had to overcome a particularly challenging childhood, brought on by a severe case of pneumonia at the age of 2. Doctors gave antibiotics which saved him, but which also left him almost completely deaf. He attended a school for the deaf until he obtained a primitive hearing aid at the age of 12, allowing him to attend a regular school. Still, being a loner, he struggled with fitting in. At Tartu University, when a coach introduced him to rowing, he took to it so passionately that he left university to focus on rowing. He wears hearing aids on a regular basis and was also seen wearing them during his rowing competitions.

He became World Champion in Tasmania 1990 in the single sculls event. In 1995, he won the Diamond Challenge Sculls (the premier singles sculls event) at the Henley Royal Regatta, rowing for the Parnu Rowing Club.

In 2004 at age 38, he won an Olympic silver medal in the single sculls event at the 2004 Summer Olympics in Athens. In Beijing 2008 he won his second Olympic silver medal, this time in the double sculls event with Tõnu Endrekson and became Estonia's oldest Olympic medal winner with the age of 42 years, 10 months and two days. He is a member of the SK Pärnu rowing club located in Pärnu. In 2007, Jaanson became the oldest rower ever to win a World Cup event at the age of 41 in Amsterdam.

Jaanson is among four athletes to compete in rowing at six Olympics, with Romanian Elisabeta Lipă in 2004, Canadian Lesley Thompson (cox) in 2008, and Australian James Tomkins.

On 18 November 2010, Jaanson announced his retirement. In July 2011 he was awarded with the Thomas Keller Medal, the highest honor in rowing.

He is also a member of the Estonian parliament, the Riigikogu for the Reform Party.

== Olympic Games ==
- 1988 Seoul – 8th Single sculls
- 1992 Barcelona – 5th Single sculls
- 1996 Atlanta – 18th Single sculls
- 2000 Sydney – 6th Single sculls
- 2004 Athens – Single sculls
- 2008 Beijing – Double sculls (with Tõnu Endrekson)

== World Championships ==
- 1989 Bled, Yugoslavia – Single sculls
- 1990 Tasmania, Australia – Single sculls
- 1991 Vienna, Austria – 12th Single sculls
- 1995 Tampere, Finland – Single sculls
- 1997 Aiguebelette, France – 13th Single sculls
- 1998 Cologne, Germany – 14th Single sculls
- 1999 St. Catharines, Canada – 7th Single sculls
- 2001 Luzerne, Switzerland – 7th Single sculls
- 2003 Milan, Italy – 7th Single sculls
- 2005 Gifu, Japan – Quadruple sculls (with Andrei Jämsä, Tõnu Endrekson and Leonid Gulov)
- 2007 Munich, Germany – Double sculls (with Tõnu Endrekson)

== European Championships ==
- 2008 Marathon, Greece – Quadruple Sculls (with Tõnu Endrekson, Andrei Jämsä and Allar Raja)

== Rowing World Cup ==
Overall wins

- Single sculls: 1990, 1995
- Quadruple sculls: 2005
- Double sculls: 2007

Jüri Jaanson Rowing World Cup appearances
#	Date	Venue	Country	Position	Class	Crew
1990
1.	5–7 April 1990	Mission Bay, San Diego	United States	FA 3rd	Single scull	Jüri Jaanson
2.	11–13 May 1990	Mannheim	West Germany	FA 1st	Single scull	Jüri Jaanson
3.	1–3 June 1990	Rostadion	Norway	FA 1st	Single scull	Jüri Jaanson
4.	29 June-1 July 1990	Bosbaan, Amsterdam	Netherlands	FA 3rd	Single scull	Jüri Jaanson
5.	13–15 July 1990	Rotsee, Lucerne	Switzerland	FA 1st	Single scull	Jüri Jaanson
1991
6.	5–7 April 1991	Mission Bay, San Diego	(United States) USA	FA 5th	Single scull	Jüri Jaanson
7.	8–10 April 1991	Piediluco	Italy	FA 6th	Single scull	Jüri Jaanson
8.	24–26 May 1991	Wedau, Duisburg	Germany	FA 6th	Single scull	Jüri Jaanson
9.	31 May-2 June 1991	Hjelmsjoe, Örkelljunga	Sweden	FB 7th	Single scull	Jüri Jaanson
1992
10.	3–5 April 1992	Mission Bay, San Diego	(United States) USA	FB 7th	Single scull	Jüri Jaanson
11.	1–3 May 1992	Fühlinger See, Cologne	Germany	FB 7th	Single scull	Jüri Jaanson
12.	29–31 May 1992	Bagsværd, Copenhagen	Denmark	FA 2nd	Single scull	Jüri Jaanson
13.	12–14 June 1992	Rotsee, Lucerne	Switzerland	FA 5th	Single scull	Jüri Jaanson
1994
14.	15–17 July 1994	Rotsee, Lucerne	Switzerland	FB 7th	Single scull	Jüri Jaanson
1995
15.	2–4 June 1995	Hazewinkel	Belgium	FA 1st	Single scull	Jüri Jaanson
16.	16–18 June 1995	Paris	France	FA 1st	Single scull	Jüri Jaanson
17.	30 June-2 July 1995	Henley-on-Thames	(United Kingdom) Great Britain	FA 1st	Single scull	Jüri Jaanson
18.	7–9 July 1995	Rotsee, Lucerne	Switzerland	FA 1st	Single scull	Jüri Jaanson
1998
19.	29–31 May 1998	Oberschleissheim, Munich	Germany	FB 7th	Single scull	Jüri Jaanson
1999
20.	9–11 July 1999	Rotsee, Lucerne	Switzerland	FB 12th	Single scull	Jüri Jaanson
2000
21.	1–3 June 2000	Oberschleissheim, Munich	Germany	FA 3rd	Single scull	Jüri Jaanson
22.	23–25 June 2000	Vienna, Austria	Austria	FB 8th	Double scull	(b) Tõnu Endrekson, (s) Jüri Jaanson
23.	14–16 July 2000	Rotsee, Lucerne	Switzerland	SA/B 2	Single scull	Jüri Jaanson
2001
24.	13–15 July 2001	Oberschleissheim, Munich	Germany	FA 5th	Single scull	Jüri Jaanson
2002
25.	1–3 August 2002	Rotsee, Lucerne	Switzerland	FB 9th	Single scull	Jüri Jaanson
2003
26.	29–31 May 2003	Idroscalo, Milan	Italy	R4	Single scull	Jüri Jaanson
27.	19–21 June 2003	Oberschleissheim, Munich	Germany	FC 13th	Single scull	Jüri Jaanson
2004
28.	7–9 May 2004	Lake Malta, Poznań	Poland	FA 1st	Single scull	Jüri Jaanson
29.	18–20 June 2004	Rotsee, Lucerne	Switzerland	R1	Single scull	Jüri Jaanson
2005
30.	26–28 May 2005	Dorney Lake, Dorney	(United Kingdom) Great Britain	FA 1st	Quad scull	(b) Jüri Jaanson, Leonid Gulov, Tõnu Endrekson, (s) Andrei Jämsä
31.	8–10 July 2005	Rotsee, Lucerne	Switzerland	FA 1st	Quad scull	(b) Jüri Jaanson, Leonid Gulov, Tõnu Endrekson, (s) Andrei Jämsä
2007
32.	1–3 June 2007	Danube, Linz/Ottensheim	Austria	FA 5th	Double scull	(b) Tõnu Endrekson, (s) Jüri Jaanson
33.	22–24 June 2007	Bosbaan, Amsterdam	Netherlands	FA 1st	Double scull	(b) Tõnu Endrekson, (s) Jüri Jaanson
34.	13–15 July 2007	Rotsee, Lucerne	Switzerland	FA 1st	Double scull	(b) Tõnu Endrekson, (s) Jüri Jaanson
2008
35.	20–22 June 2008	Lake Malta, Poznań	Poland	FA 3rd	Double scull	(b) Tõnu Endrekson, (s) Jüri Jaanson
2009
36.	18–20 June 2009	Oberschleissheim, Munich	Germany	FC 12th	Single scull	Jüri Jaanson

== See also ==
- List of athletes with the most appearances at Olympic Games

Awards
Preceded by Jaan Ehlvest	Estonian Sportsman of the Year; 1990	Succeeded by Tiit Sokk
Preceded by Ago Markvardt	Estonian Sportsman of the Year; 1995	Succeeded by Erki Nool
Preceded by Andrus Värnik	Estonian Sportsman of the Year; 2004	Succeeded by Andrus Veerpalu
Preceded by James Tomkins	Thomas Keller Medal; 2011	Succeeded by Václav Chalupa
Summer Olympics
Preceded by Heino Lipp	Flagbearer for Estonia; Atlanta 1996	Succeeded by Tõnu Tõniste
