= Estonia at the Olympics =

- IOC code: EST
- NOC: Estonian Olympic Committee
- Website: www.eok.ee (in Estonian)
- Medals Ranked 54th: Gold 14 Silver 12 Bronze 19 Total 45

Summer appearances
- 1920; 1924; 1928; 1932; 1936; 1948–1988; 1992; 1996; 2000; 2004; 2008; 2012; 2016; 2020; 2024

Winter appearances
- 1928; 1932; 1936; 1948–1988; 1992; 1994; 1998; 2002; 2006; 2010; 2014; 2018; 2022; 2026

Other related appearances
- Russian Empire (1908–1912); Soviet Union (1952–1988)

Estonia first competed as a nation at the 1920 Summer Olympics, two years after declaring independence from the then warring Russian and German Empires in 1918. The Estonian National Olympic Committee was established in 1923.

Estonia participated in both Summer and Winter Games until the country was invaded and occupied by the Soviet Union in 1940. From 1952 to 1988, Estonian athletes competed under the Soviet flag. Notably, the 1980 Summer Olympics sailing regatta was hosted in Tallinn, during the period of Soviet occupation.

Athletes representing independent Estonia made their Winter Olympics debut at the II Olympic Winter Games 1928 in St. Moritz, competing in speed skating. Following the restoration of independence in 1991, Estonia resumed participation as a sovereign nation starting from the 1992 Winter Olympics in Albertville and the 1992 Summer Olympics in Barcelona.

Jüri Lossman became the first athlete representing Estonia to win an Olympic medal of any colour, earning silver in the men's marathon. At the same Games, Alfred Neuland won Estonia's first Olympic gold medal, triumphing in the men's lightweight weightlifting event. At the 2002 Winter Olympics in Salt Lake City, Andrus Veerpalu became the first athlete representing independent Estonia to win a Winter Olympic medal, taking gold in the men's 15 km cross-country skiing event.

Since regaining independence, Estonia has participated in every edition of both the Summer and Winter Olympics. Estonia has won most of its medals in wrestling (11), weightlifting (7), cross-country skiing (7) and athletics (6).

== Medal tables ==
=== Medals by Summer Games ===
Games	Athletes	Gold	Silver	Bronze	Total	Rank
1908–1912	as part of the Russian Empire					
(Belgium) 1920 Antwerp	14	1	2	0	3	14
(French Third Republic) 1924 Paris	44	1	1	4	6	17
(Netherlands) 1928 Amsterdam	20	2	1	2	5	16
(United States) 1932 Los Angeles	2	0	0	0	0	–
(Nazi Germany) 1936 Berlin	37	2	2	3	7	13
1948–1988	occupied by the Soviet Union					
(Spain) 1992 Barcelona	37	1	0	1	2	34
(United States) 1996 Atlanta	43	0	0	0	0	–
(Australia) 2000 Sydney	33	1	0	2	3	47
(Greece) 2004 Athens	42	0	1	2	3	64
(China) 2008 Beijing	47	1	1	0	2	46
(United Kingdom) 2012 London	32	0	1	1	2	63
(Brazil) 2016 Rio de Janeiro	45	0	0	1	1	78
(Japan) 2020 Tokyo	33	1	0	1	2	59
(France) 2024 Paris	24	0	0	0	0	–
(United States) 2028 Los Angeles	future event					
(Australia) 2032 Brisbane	future event					
Total (14/30)	453	10	9	17	36	60

=== Medals by Winter Games ===
Games	Athletes	Gold	Silver	Bronze	Total	Rank
(Switzerland) 1928 St. Moritz	2	0	0	0	0	–
(United States) 1932 Lake Placid	did not participate					
(Nazi Germany) 1936 Garmisch-Partenkirchen	5	0	0	0	0	–
1948–1988	occupied by the Soviet Union					
(France) 1992 Albertville	19	0	0	0	0	–
(Norway) 1994 Lillehammer	26	0	0	0	0	–
(Japan) 1998 Nagano	20	0	0	0	0	–
(United States) 2002 Salt Lake City	17	1	1	1	3	17
(Italy) 2006 Turin	26	3	0	0	3	12
(Canada) 2010 Vancouver	30	0	1	0	1	25
(Russia) 2014 Sochi	25	0	0	0	0	–
(South Korea) 2018 Pyeongchang	22	0	0	0	0	–
(China) 2022 Beijing	26	0	0	1	1	27
(Italy) 2026 Milano Cortina	31	0	1	0	1	25
(France) 2030 French Alps	future event					
(United States) 2034 Utah	future event					
Total (12/25)	249	4	3	2	9	30

=== Medals by summer sport ===
Games	Gold	Silver	Bronze	Total	Rank
Wrestling	5	2	4	11	17
Athletics	2	1	3	6	50
Weightlifting	1	3	3	7	31
Fencing	1	0	1	2	24
Cycling	1	0	0	1	30
Rowing	0	2	1	3	34
Boxing	0	1	0	1	59
Judo	0	0	3	3	46
Sailing	0	0	2	2	44
Total	10	9	17	36	52

=== Medals by winter sport ===
Games	Gold	Silver	Bronze	Total	Rank
Cross country skiing	4	2	1	7	7
Freestyle skiing	0	1	1	2	–
Total	4	3	2	9	27

== List of medalists ==
=== Summer Olympics ===
Medal	Name	Games	Sport	Event
Gold	Alfred Neuland	1920 Antwerp	Weightlifting	Men's lightweight
Silver	Jüri Lossmann	1920 Antwerp	Athletics	Men's marathon
Silver	Alfred Schmidt	1920 Antwerp	Weightlifting	Men's featherweight
Gold	Eduard Pütsep	1924 Paris	Wrestling	Men's Greco-Roman bantamweight
Silver	Alfred Neuland	1924 Paris	Weightlifting	Men's middleweight
Bronze	Aleksander Klumberg	1924 Paris	Athletics	Men's decathlon
Bronze	Jaan Kikkas	1924 Paris	Weightlifting	Men's middleweight
Bronze	Harald Tammer	1924 Paris	Weightlifting	Men's heavyweight
Bronze	Roman Steinberg	1924 Paris	Wrestling	Men's Greco-Roman middleweight
Gold	Osvald Käpp	1928 Amsterdam	Wrestling	Men's freestyle lightweight
Gold	Voldemar Väli	1928 Amsterdam	Wrestling	Men's Greco-Roman featherweight
Silver	Arnold Luhaäär	1928 Amsterdam	Weightlifting	Men's heavyweight
Bronze	Nikolai Vekšin, William von Wirén, Eberhard Vogdt, Georg Faehlmann, Andreas Faehlmann	1928 Amsterdam	Sailing	Men's 6 metre class
Bronze	Albert Kusnets	1928 Amsterdam	Wrestling	Men's Greco-Roman middleweight
Gold	Kristjan Palusalu	1936 Berlin	Wrestling	Men's Greco-Roman heavyweight
Gold	Kristjan Palusalu	1936 Berlin	Wrestling	Men's freestyle heavyweight
Silver	Nikolai Stepulov	1936 Berlin	Boxing	Men's lightweight
Silver	August Neo	1936 Berlin	Wrestling	Men's freestyle light-heavyweight
Bronze	Arnold Luhaäär	1936 Berlin	Weightlifting	Men's heavyweight
Bronze	Voldemar Väli	1936 Berlin	Wrestling	Men's Greco-Roman lightweight
Bronze	August Neo	1936 Berlin	Wrestling	Men's Greco-Roman light-heavyweight
Gold	Erika Salumäe	1992 Barcelona	Cycling	Women's sprint
Bronze	Tõnu Tõniste, Toomas Tõniste	1992 Barcelona	Sailing	Men's 470 team competition
Gold	Erki Nool	2000 Sydney	Athletics	Men's decathlon
Bronze	Aleksei Budõlin	2000 Sydney	Judo	Men's half middleweight – 81 kg
Bronze	Indrek Pertelson	2000 Sydney	Judo	Men's heavyweight (+100 kg)
Silver	Jüri Jaanson	2004 Athens	Rowing	Men's single sculls
Bronze	Aleksander Tammert	2004 Athens	Athletics	Men's discus throw
Bronze	Indrek Pertelson	2004 Athens	Judo	Men's heavyweight (+100 kg)
Gold	Gerd Kanter	2008 Beijing	Athletics	Men's discus throw
Silver	Tõnu Endrekson; Jüri Jaanson	2008 Beijing	Rowing	Men's double sculls
Silver	Heiki Nabi	2012 London	Wrestling	Men's Greco-Roman −120 kg
Bronze	Gerd Kanter	2012 London	Athletics	Men's discus throw
Bronze	Tõnu Endrekson, Andrei Jämsä, Allar Raja, Kaspar Taimsoo	2016 Rio de Janeiro	Rowing	Men's quadruple sculls
Gold	Julia Beljajeva, Irina Embrich, Erika Kirpu, Katrina Lehis	2020 Tokyo	Fencing	Women's team épée
Bronze	Katrina Lehis	2020 Tokyo	Fencing	Women's épée

=== Winter Olympics ===
Medal	Name	Games	Sport	Event
Gold	Andrus Veerpalu	2002 Salt Lake City	Cross-country skiing	Men's 15 km classical
Silver	Andrus Veerpalu	2002 Salt Lake City	Cross-country skiing	Men's 50 km classical
Bronze	Jaak Mae	2002 Salt Lake City	Cross-country skiing	Men's 15 km classical
Gold	Andrus Veerpalu	2006 Turin	Cross-country skiing	Men's 15 km classical
Gold	Kristina Šmigun	2006 Turin	Cross-country skiing	Women's 15 kilometre pursuit
Gold	Kristina Šmigun	2006 Turin	Cross-country skiing	Women's 10 km classical
Silver	Kristina Šmigun-Vähi	2010 Vancouver	Cross-country skiing	Women's 10 kilometre freestyle
Bronze	Kelly Sildaru	2022 Beijing	Freestyle skiing	Women's slopestyle
Silver	Henry Sildaru	2026 Milano Cortina	Freestyle skiing	Men's halfpipe

=== List of gold medal winners during Soviet time ===
No.	Name	Sport	Year
In the Soviet Union
1	Johannes Kotkas	Wrestling	1952
2	Ants Antson	Speed skating	1964
3	Jaan Talts	Weightlifting	1972
4	Jüri Tarmak	Athletics	1972
5	Aavo Pikkuus	Cycling	1976
6	Jaak Uudmäe	Athletics	1980
7	Ivar Stukolkin	Swimming	1980
8	Viljar Loor	Volleyball	1980
9	Mait Riisman	Water polo	1980
10	Tiit Sokk	Basketball	1988
11	Erika Salumäe	Cycling	1988

== Summer sports ==
Estonia has participated in most summer sports, but they have yet to participate in: Artistic swimming, Baseball/Softball, Cricket, Diving, Field hockey, Golf, Handball, Lacrosse, Rugby football (neither Rugby sevens or the discontinued discipline Rugby union), Skateboarding, Sport climbing, Surfing, Taekwondo and Water polo.

Estonia never participated in the following discontinued sports: Basque pelota, Croquet, Jeu de paume, Karate, Polo, Rackets, Roque, Tug of war and Water motorsports.

=== Aquatics ===
For the swimming discipline, follow this link: Swimming.

Estonia has yet to participate in Artistic swimming, Diving and Water polo.

=== Archery ===
Archery was included in the Olympic programme four times between 1900 and 1920. It returned in 1972 and has remained in the Olympic programme ever since.

Estonia's best placement in the sport is shared 17th by Reena Pärnat in women's individual in 2020.

Estonia's best placement in a men's event in the sport is 42nd by Raul Kivilo in men's individual in 1996.

Games	Archers	Events	Gold	Silver	Bronze	Total	Ranking
1992 Barcelona	1	1/4	0	0	0	0	
1996 Atlanta	1	1/4	0	0	0	0	
2012 London	1	1/4	0	0	0	0	
2016 Rio de Janeiro	1	1/4	0	0	0	0	
2020 Tokyo	1	1/5	0	0	0	0	
Total			0	0	0	0	–

=== Athletics ===
Athletics has been included in the Olympic programme since the inaugural 1896 Summer Olympics.

Estonia has won 6 medals in the sport; 2 gold, 1 silver and 3 bronze.

Their most successful athlete in the sport is Gerd Kanter who won gold in men's discus throw in 2008 and bronze in the same event in 2012.

Estonia's other Olympic champion in the sport is Erki Nool who won gold in men's decathlon in 2000.

Three more Estonian athletes have won medals in the sport; Jüri Lossman won silver in men's marathon in 1920, Aleksander Klumberg won bronze in men's decathlon in 1924 and Aleksander Tammert won bronze in men's discus throw in 2004.

Estonia's best placement in a women's event in the sport is 6th by Ksenija Balta in women's long jump in 2016.

Games	Athletes	Events	Gold	Silver	Bronze	Total	Ranking
1920 Antwerp	7	13/29	0	1	0	1	=10
1924 Paris	10	12/27	0	0	1	1	=12
1928 Amsterdam	4	5/27	0	0	0	0	
1932 Los Angeles	1	1/29	0	0	0	0	
1936 Berlin	7	8/29	0	0	0	0	
1992 Barcelona	5	5/43	0	0	0	0	
1996 Atlanta	12	11/44	0	0	0	0	
2000 Sydney	5	4/46	1	0	0	1	=18
2004 Athens	15	12/46	0	0	1	1	=35
2008 Beijing	14	11/47	1	0	0	1	=17
2012 London	10	9/47	0	0	1	1	=36
2016 Rio de Janeiro	18	10/47	0	0	0	0	
2020 Tokyo	7	4/48	0	0	0	0	
Total			2	1	3	6	53

=== Badminton ===
Badminton has been included in the Olympic programme since 1992.

Estonia's best placement in the sport is shared 14th, both by Raul Must in men's singles in 2016 and by Kati Tolmoff in women's singles in 2016.

Games	Players	Events	Gold	Silver	Bronze	Total	Ranking
2008 Beijing	2	2/5	0	0	0	0	
2012 London	1	1/5	0	0	0	0	
2016 Rio de Janeiro	2	2/5	0	0	0	0	
2020 Tokyo	2	2/5	0	0	0	0	
Total			0	0	0	0	–

=== Basketball ===
==== 3x3 Basketball ====
3x3 basketball has been included in the Olympic programme since 2020.

Estonia has yet to participate in the discipline.

==== Team basketball ====
Basketball has been included in the Olympic programme since 1936.

Estonia men's national basketball team has participated once, finishing shared 9th in 1936.

Estonia has yet to participate in women's events in the discipline.

Games	Players	Events	Gold	Silver	Bronze	Total	Ranking
1936 Berlin	13	1/1	0	0	0	0	
Total			0	0	0	0	–

=== Boxing ===
Boxing has been included in the Olympic programme since 1904 with the exception of 1912.

Estonia has won one silver medal in the sport, Nikolai Stepulov won the medal in lightweight in 1936.

Estonia has yet to participate in women's events in the sport.

Games	Boxers	Events	Gold	Silver	Bronze	Total	Ranking
1924 Paris	1	1/8	0	0	0	0	
1928 Amsterdam	1	1/8	0	0	0	0	
1936 Berlin	2	2/8	0	1	0	1	=9
Total			0	1	0	1	=60

=== Canoeing ===
==== Slalom ====
Canoe slalom was first included in the Olympic programme in 1972. It returned in 1992 and has remained in the programme since then.

Estonia has yet to participate in the discipline.

==== Sprint ====
Canoe sprint (including the discontinued discipline canoe marathon) has been included in the Olympic programme since 1936.

Estonia has yet to make it to a final in canoe sprint, so they have not yet received a formal placement in the sport. Their best result is arguably Hain Helde's placement in the semifinals of men's K1 1000m in 1996, which would be equivalent to around 12th place.

Estonia has yet to participate in women's events in the discipline.

Games	Canoeists	Events	Gold	Silver	Bronze	Total	Ranking
1992 Barcelona	1	2/12	0	0	0	0	
1996 Atlanta	1	2/12	0	0	0	0	
2000 Sydney	1	2/12	0	0	0	0	
Total			0	0	0	0	–

=== Cycling ===
Estonia has yet to participate in the disciplines BMX freestyle and BMX racing.

==== Mountain biking ====
Mountain biking has been included in the Olympic programme since 1996.

Estonia's best placement in the sport is 17th by Janika Lõiv in the women's event in 2020.

Estonia's best placement in a men's event in the sport is 41st by Sigvard Kukk in the men's event in 2004.

Games	Cyclists	Events	Gold	Silver	Bronze	Total	Ranking
1996 Atlanta	1	1/2	0	0	0	0	
2004 Athens	1	1/2	0	0	0	0	
2020 Tokyo	1	1/2	0	0	0	0	
Total			0	0	0	0	–

==== Road cycling ====
Road cycling was included in the Olympic programme in 1896. It returned in 1912 and has remained in the Olympic programme ever since.

Estonia's best placement in the discipline is 5th by Lauri Aus in men's individual road race in 1992.

Estonia's best placement in a women's event in the discipline is 17th by Grete Treier in women's individual road race in 2012.

Games	Cyclists	Events	Gold	Silver	Bronze	Total	Ranking
1992 Barcelona	2	1/3	0	0	0	0	
1996 Atlanta	5	1/4	0	0	0	0	
2000 Sydney	5	2/4	0	0	0	0	
2004 Athens	5	2/4	0	0	0	0	
2008 Beijing	3	3/4	0	0	0	0	
2012 London	2	2/4	0	0	0	0	
2016 Rio de Janeiro	2	1/4	0	0	0	0	
2020 Tokyo	3	2/4	0	0	0	0	
Total			0	0	0	0	–

==== Track cycling ====
Track cycling was included in the inaugural 1896 Summer Olympic programme and has been included in all Summer Games except for 1912.

Estonia has won one medal in the discipline, Erika Salumäe won gold in women's sprint in 1992.

Estonia's best placement in a men's event in the sport is 21st by Daniel Novikov in men's sprint in 2008.

Games	Cyclists	Events	Gold	Silver	Bronze	Total	Ranking
1992 Barcelona	1	1/7	1	0	0	1	=2
1996 Atlanta	1	1/8	0	0	0	0	
2008 Beijing	1	1/10	0	0	0	0	
Total			1	0	0	1	=22

=== Equestrian ===
Estonia has yet to participate in the disciplines Equestrian eventing and Equestrian show jumping.

They did not participate in the discontinued disciplines Equestrian driving or Equestrian vaulting.

==== Dressage ====
Dressage had one event included in 1900. It returned to the Olympic programme in 1912 and has remained in the Olympic programme ever since.

Estonia has participated in the discipline once. Dina Ellermann finished 49th in the individual event.

Estonia has yet to send a male rider to participate in the discipline.

Games	Riders	Events	Gold	Silver	Bronze	Total	Ranking
2020 Tokyo	1	1/2	0	0	0	0	
Total			0	0	0	0	–

=== Fencing ===
Fencing has been included in the Olympic programme since the inaugural 1896 Games.

Estonia has won two medals in fencing. Julia Beljajeva, Irina Embrich, Erika Kirpu and Katrina Lehis won gold in women's team épée in 2020. Katrina Lehis also won bronze in women's individual épée in the same games.

Estonia's best placement in a men's event in the sport is 4th by Kaido Kaaberma in men's individual épée in 1992.

Games	Fencers	Events	Gold	Silver	Bronze	Total	Ranking
1992 Barcelona	2	1/8	0	0	0	0	
1996 Atlanta	6	4/10	0	0	0	0	
2000 Sydney	4	2/10	0	0	0	0	
2008 Beijing	1	1/10	0	0	0	0	
2012 London	1	1/10	0	0	0	0	
2016 Rio de Janeiro	5	3/10	0	0	0	0	
2020 Tokyo	4	2/12	1	0	1	2	=5
Total			1	0	1	2	26

=== Football ===
Football has been included in the Olympic programme since 1900 with the exception of 1932.

Estonia men's national football team has participated once, in 1924. They finished shared 17th.

Estonia has yet to participate in women's events in the sport.

Games	Footballers	Events	Gold	Silver	Bronze	Total	Ranking
1924 Paris	11	1/1	0	0	0	0	
Total			0	0	0	0	–

=== Gymnastics ===
Estonia has yet to participate in the disciplines Artistic gymnastics and Trampoline.

==== Rhythmic gymnastics ====
Rhythmic gymnastics has been included in the Olympic programme since 1984.

Estonia's best placement in the sport is 20th by Irina Kikkas in individual all-around in 2008.

There are no men's events in the discipline.

Games	Gymnasts	Events	Gold	Silver	Bronze	Total	Ranking
2008 Beijing	1	1/2	0	0	0	0	
Total			0	0	0	0	–

=== Judo ===
Judo has been included in the Olympic programme since 1964 with the exception of the 1968 Games.

Estonia has won 3 bronze medals in the sport.

Indrek Pertelson won bronzes in men's +100 kg in both 2000 and 2004. Aleksei Budõlin won bronze in men's 81 kg in 2000.

Estonia has yet to participate in women's events in the sport.

Games	Judoka	Events	Gold	Silver	Bronze	Total	Ranking
1992 Barcelona	1	1/14	0	0	0	0	
1996 Atlanta	1	1/14	0	0	0	0	
2000 Sydney	2	2/14	0	0	2	2	=14
2004 Athens	2	2/14	0	0	1	1	=17
2008 Beijing	1	1/14	0	0	0	0	
2012 London	1	1/14	0	0	0	0	
2016 Rio de Janeiro	1	1/14	0	0	0	0	
2020 Tokyo	1	1/15	0	0	0	0	
Total			0	0	3	3	=47

=== Modern pentathlon ===
Modern pentathlon has been included in the Olympic programme since 1912.

Estonia's best placement in the sport is 7th by Imre Tiidemann in the individual event in 1996.

Estonia has yet to participate in women's events in the sport.

Games	Pentathletes	Events	Gold	Silver	Bronze	Total	Ranking
1992 Barcelona	1	1/2	0	0	0	0	
1996 Atlanta	1	1/1	0	0	0	0	
2000 Sydney	1	1/2	0	0	0	0	
Total			0	0	0	0	–

=== Rowing ===
Rowing has been included in the Olympic programme since 1900.

Estonia has won 3 medals in the sport, 2 silver and 1 bronze.

Jüri Jaanson has won 2 silver medals in the sport, one in men's single sculls in 2004 and one together with Tõnu Endrekson in men's double sculls in 2008.

Tõnu Endrekson has also won two medals in the sport, on top of his silver medal mentioned above he also won a bronze medal together with Andrei Jämsä, Allar Raja and Kaspar Taimsoo in men's quadruple sculls in 2016.

Estonia has yet to participate in women's events in the sport.

Games	Rowers	Events	Gold	Silver	Bronze	Total	Ranking
1936 Berlin	0	0/7	0	0	0	0	
1992 Barcelona	0	0/14	0	0	0	0	
1996 Atlanta	0	0/14	0	0	0	0	
2000 Sydney	0	0/14	0	0	0	0	
2004 Athens	0	0/14	0	1	0	1	=14
2008 Beijing	0	0/14	0	1	0	1	=14
2012 London	0	0/14	0	0	0	0	
2016 Rio de Janeiro	0	0/14	0	0	1	1	=19
2020 Tokyo	0	0/14	0	0	0	0	
Total			0	2	1	3	37

=== Sailing ===
Sailing has been included in the Olympic programme since 1900 with the exception of 1904.

Estonia has won two bronze medals in the sport.

Andreas Faehlmann, Georg Faehlmann, Nikolai Vekšin, Eberhard Vogdt and William von Wirén won bronze in 6 metre in 1928 and Tõnu Tõniste and Toomas Tõniste won bronze in men's 470 in 1992.

Estonia's best placement in a women's event in the sport is 6th by Krista Kruuv in Europe in 1992.

Games	Sailors	Events	Gold	Silver	Bronze	Total	Ranking
1928 Amsterdam	5	1/3	0	0	1	1	=6
1936 Berlin	1	1/4	0	0	0	0	
1992 Barcelona	4	3/10	0	0	1	1	=9
1996 Atlanta	4	3/10	0	0	0	0	
2000 Sydney	4	3/11	0	0	0	0	
2004 Athens	1	1/11	0	0	0	0	
2008 Beijing	2	2/11	0	0	0	0	
2012 London	5	5/10	0	0	0	0	
2016 Rio de Janeiro	5	4/10	0	0	0	0	
2020 Tokyo	2	2/10	0	0	0	0	
Total			0	0	2	2	45

=== Shooting ===
Shooting was included in the inaugural 1896 Summer Olympic programme and has been included in all Summer Games except for 1904 and 1928.

Estonia's best placement in the sport is 7th by Andrei Inešin in men's skeet in 1996.

Estonia's best placement in a women's event in the sport is shared 21st by Inna Rose in women's 10m air pistol in 1992.

Games	Shooters	Events	Gold	Silver	Bronze	Total	Ranking
1992 Barcelona	3	4/13	0	0	0	0	
1996 Atlanta	2	2/15	0	0	0	0	
2000 Sydney	1	1/17	0	0	0	0	
2004 Athens	1	1/17	0	0	0	0	
2008 Beijing	1	1/15	0	0	0	0	
2012 London	1	2/15	0	0	0	0	
2016 Rio de Janeiro	1	1/15	0	0	0	0	
2020 Tokyo	1	2/15	0	0	0	0	
Total			0	0	0	0	–

=== Swimming ===
==== Long course swimming ====
Long course swimming has been included in the Olympic programme since the inaugural 1896 Summer Olympics.

Estonia's best placement in the discipline is 7th by Kregor Zirk in men's 200m butterfly in 2024 and by Eneli Jefimova in women's 100m breaststroke in 2024.

Games	Swimmers	Events	Gold	Silver	Bronze	Total	Ranking
1936 Berlin	2	2/11	0	0	0	0	
1992 Barcelona	4	7/31	0	0	0	0	
1996 Atlanta	1	2/32	0	0	0	0	
2000 Sydney	4	7/32	0	0	0	0	
2004 Athens	6	8/32	0	0	0	0	
2008 Beijing	9	12/32	0	0	0	0	
2012 London	2	4/32	0	0	0	0	
2016 Rio de Janeiro	2	2/32	0	0	0	0	
2020 Tokyo	3	7/35	0	0	0	0	
2024 Paris	2	4/35	0	0	0	0	
Total			0	0	0	0	–

==== Marathon swimming ====
Marathon swimming has been included in the Olympic programme since 2008.

Estonia has yet to participate in the discipline.

=== Table tennis ===
Table tennis has been included in the Olympic programme since 1988.

Estonia's best placement in the sport is shared 33rd by Igor Solopov in men's singles in 1992.

Estonia has yet to participate in women's events in the sport.

Games	Players	Events	Gold	Silver	Bronze	Total	Ranking
1992 Barcelona	1	1/4	0	0	0	0	
Total			0	0	0	0	–

=== Tennis ===
Tennis was originally included in the Olympic programme between 1896 and 1924. Tennis returned to the games in 1988 and has remained in the programme since then.

Estonia's best placement in the sport is shared 9th by Kaia Kanepi in women's singles in 2008.

Estonia has yet to participate in men's events in the sport.

Games	Players	Events	Gold	Silver	Bronze	Total	Ranking
2004 Athens	2	2/4	0	0	0	0	
2008 Beijing	2	2/4	0	0	0	0	
2020 Tokyo	1	1/5	0	0	0	0	
Total			0	0	0	0	–

=== Triathlon ===
Triathlon has been included in the Olympic programme since 2000.

Estonia's best placement in the sport is 21st by Marko Albert in the men's event in 2004.

Estonia's best placement in a women's event in the sport is 44th by Kaidi Kivioja in the women's event in 2016.

Games	Triathletes	Events	Gold	Silver	Bronze	Total	Ranking
2004 Athens	1	1/2	0	0	0	0	
2008 Beijing	1	1/2	0	0	0	0	
2016 Rio de Janeiro	1	1/2	0	0	0	0	
2020 Tokyo	1	1/3	0	0	0	0	
Total			0	0	0	0	–

=== Volleyball ===
==== Beach volleyball ====
Beach volleyball has been included in the Olympic programme since 1996.

Estonia's best placement in the discipline is shared 17th by Avo Keel and Kaido Kreen in the men's event in 1996.

Estonia has yet to participate in women's events in the discipline.

Games	Players	Events	Gold	Silver	Bronze	Total	Ranking
1996 Atlanta	2	1/2	0	0	0	0	
2008 Beijing	2	1/2	0	0	0	0	
Total			0	0	0	0	–

==== Indoor volleyball ====
Indoor volleyball has been included in the Olympic programme since 1964.

Estonia has yet to participate in the discipline.

=== Weightlifting ===
Weightlifting was first included in the Olympic programme at the inaugural 1896 Summer Olympics. It was excluded from the 1900, 1908 and 1912 Games but have been included every other time.

Estonia was quite successful before the second world war, winning 1 gold, 3 silver and 3 bronze medals.

Their most successful weightlifter was Alfred Neuland who won gold in men's 67.5 kg in 1920 and silver in men's 75 kg in 1924. In the latter event Jaan Kikkas won the bronze for Estonia too.

Estonia's second most successful weightlifter was Arnold Luhaäär who also won two medals in weightlifting, a silver in men's +82.5 kg in 1928 and a bronze in the same event in 1936.

Alfred Schmidt won silver in men's 60 kg in 1920. Harald Tammer won bronze in men's +82.5 kg in 1924.

Estonia has yet to participate in women's events in the sport.

Games	Weightlifters	Events	Gold	Silver	Bronze	Total	Ranking
1920 Antwerp	3	2/5	1	1	0	2	=3
1924 Paris	8	5/5	0	1	2	3	4
1928 Amsterdam	4	4/5	0	1	0	1	=6
1936 Berlin	4	4/5	0	0	1	1	7
2016 Rio de Janeiro	1	1/15	0	0	0	0	
Total			1	3	3	7	35

=== Wrestling ===
Wrestling was included in the inaugural 1896 Summer Olympic programme and has been included in all Summer Games except for 1900.

Wrestling is Estonia's most successful sport in terms of both gold medals won, with 5, and overall medals won, with 11.

Estonia's most successful wrestler is Kristjan Palusalu who won gold in both men's Greco-Roman heavyweight and men's freestyle heavyweight in 1936. Their second most successful wrestler is Voldemar Väli who won gold in men's Greco-Roman featherweight in 1928 and bronze in men's Greco-Roman lightweight in 1936.

Their remaining Olympic champions are Eduard Pütsep who won men's Greco-Roman bantamweight in 1924 and Osvald Käpp who won men's freestyle lightweight in 1928.

August Neo won two medals in 1936; silver in men's freestyle light heavyweight and bronze in men's Greco-Roman light heavyweight.

Estonia's remaining medalists in the sport are Heiki Nabi who won silver in men's Greco-Roman 120 kg in 2012, Roman Steinberg who won bronze in men's Greco-Roman middleweight in 1924 and Albert Kusnets who won bronze in men's Greco-Roman middleweight in 1928.

Estonia's best placement in a women's event in the sport is 8th by Epp Mäe in women's freestyle 76 kg in 2020.

Games	Wrestlers	Events	Gold	Silver	Bronze	Total	Ranking
1920 Antwerp	4	4/10	0	0	0	0	
1924 Paris	8	7/13	1	0	1	2	5
1928 Amsterdam	6	8/13	2	0	1	3	3
1932 Los Angeles	1	2/14	0	0	0	0	
1936 Berlin	8	10/14	2	1	2	5	4
1992 Barcelona	4	4/20	0	0	0	0	
1996 Atlanta	4	4/20	0	0	0	0	
2000 Sydney	3	3/16	0	0	0	0	
2004 Athens	1	1/18	0	0	0	0	
2012 London	2	2/18	0	1	0	1	=13
2016 Rio de Janeiro	3	3/18	0	0	0	0	
2020 Tokyo	2	2/18	0	0	0	0	
Total			5	2	4	11	18

== Winter sports ==
Estonia has participated in most winter sports, but they have yet to participate in: Bobsleigh, Ice hockey, Short track speed skating, Skeleton and Snowboarding.

They never participated in Military patrol, a precursor sport to Biathlon that was only formally contested in 1924.

=== Alpine skiing ===
Alpine skiing has been included in the Olympic programme since 1936.

Estonia's best placement in the sport was 26th by Karin Peckert-Forsmann in women's combined in 1936 and by Warren Cummings Smith in men's slalom in 2014.

Games	Alpine skiers	Events	Gold	Silver	Bronze	Total	Ranking
1936 Garmisch-Partenkirchen	1	1/2	0	0	0	0	
1994 Lillehammer	1	1/10	0	0	0	0	
2006 Turin	2	3/10	0	0	0	0	
2010 Vancouver	2	4/10	0	0	0	0	
2014 Sochi	2	4/10	0	0	0	0	
2018 Pyeongchang	2	4/11	0	0	0	0	
2022 Beijing	2	4/11	0	0	0	0	
Total			0	0	0	0	–

=== Biathlon ===
An event in military patrol, a precursor sport to biathlon, was held at the 1924 Winter Olympics. Biathlon arrived as its own sport at the 1960 Winter Olympics.

Estonia's best placement in the sport was 9th by Krista Lepik, Eveli Peterson and Jelena Poljakova in women's relay in 1992.

Estonia's best placement in a men's event in the sport was 11th by Urmas Kaldvee, Kalju Ojaste, Aivo Udras and Hillar Zahkna in men's relay in 1992.

Games	Biathletes	Events	Gold	Silver	Bronze	Total	Ranking
1992 Albertville	8	6/6	0	0	0	0	
1994 Lillehammer	9	6/6	0	0	0	0	
1998 Nagano	4	3/6	0	0	0	0	
2002 Salt Lake City	4	4/8	0	0	0	0	
2006 Turin	6	7/10	0	0	0	0	
2010 Vancouver	9	8/10	0	0	0	0	
2014 Sochi	9	9/11	0	0	0	0	
2018 Pyeongchang	5	7/11	0	0	0	0	
2022 Beijing	8	9/11	0	0	0	0	
Total			0	0	0	0	–

=== Cross-country skiing ===
Cross-country skiing has been was included in the Olympic programme since the inaugural 1924 Winter Olympics.

Cross-country skiing is the winter sport Estonia has had most success in - winning 7 medals; 4 gold, 2 silver and 1 bronze. Their most successful cross-country skiers are Andrus Veerpalu and Kristina Šmigun-Vähi who have won 2 gold and 1 silver medal each.

Andrus Veerpalu won gold in men's 15 km classical in 2002 and 2006 and silver in men's 50 km classical in 2002.

Kristina Šmigun-Vähi won gold in women's 10 km classical and women's 15 km pursuit in 2006 and a silver in women's 10 km freestyle in 2010.

Jaak Mae is their remaining medalist, he won the bronze behind Andrus Veerpalu in men's 15 km classical in 2002.

Games	Skiers	Events	Gold	Silver	Bronze	Total	Ranking
1936 Garmisch-Partenkirchen	1	2/3	0	0	0	0	
1992 Albertville	6	9/10	0	0	0	0	
1994 Lillehammer	10	10/10	0	0	0	0	
1998 Nagano	9	9/10	0	0	0	0	
2002 Salt Lake City	10	11/12	1	1	1	3	5
2006 Turin	12	12/12	3	0	0	3	2
2010 Vancouver	14	11/12	0	1	0	1	=7
2014 Sochi	7	8/12	0	0	0	0	
2018 Pyeongchang	6	10/12	0	0	0	0	
2022 Beijing	8	11/12	0	0	0	0	
Total			4	2	1	7	8

=== Figure skating ===
Figure skating was first included in the Olympic programme in the 1908 and 1920 Summer Olympics. It was moved to the Winter Olympics with the inaugural 1924 Winter Olympics and has been included in every Winter Olympic Games.

Estonia's best placement in the sport was 17th by Diana Rennik and Aleksei Saks in pairs in 2006.

Games	Figure skaters	Events	Gold	Silver	Bronze	Total	Ranking
1936 Garmisch-Partenkirchen	2	1/3	0	0	0	0	
1992 Albertville	1	1/4	0	0	0	0	
1994 Lillehammer	1	1/4	0	0	0	0	
1998 Nagano	1	1/4	0	0	0	0	
2002 Salt Lake City	1	1/4	0	0	0	0	
2006 Turin	3	2/4	0	0	0	0	
2010 Vancouver	5	3/4	0	0	0	0	
2014 Sochi	2	2/5	0	0	0	0	
2022 Beijing	2	2/5	0	0	0	0	
Total			0	0	0	0	–

=== Freestyle skiing ===
Freestyle skiing has been included in the Olympic programme since 1992.

Kelly Sildaru won a bronze medal in women's slopestyle in 2022.

In the 2026 Winter Olympics, Henry Sildaru, younger brother of Kelly, won Estonia’s second freestyle skiing medal, a silver in Men’s Freeski Halfpipe.

Games	Skiers	Events	Gold	Silver	Bronze	Total	Ranking
2022 Beijing	1	3/13	0	0	1	1	=13
2026 Milano-Cortina	1	4/17	0	1	0	1	
Total			0	1	1	2	=22

=== Luge ===
Luge has been included in the Olympic programme since 1964.

Estonia's best placement in the sport was 19th by Helen Novikov in women's singles in 1994.

Estonia's only participation in a men's event in the sport was by Andrus Paul in men's singles in 1998, but he was disqualified and did not receive a placement.

Games	Lugers	Events	Gold	Silver	Bronze	Total	Ranking
1994 Lillehammer	1	1/3	0	0	0	0	
1998 Nagano	2	2/3	0	0	0	0	
Total			0	0	0	0	–

=== Nordic combined ===
Nordic combined has been included in the Olympic programme since the inaugural 1924 Winter Games.

Estonia's best placement in the sport was 4th by Magnar Freimuth, Allar Levandi and Ago Markvardt in men's team in 1994.

There are no women's events in the sport.

Games	Skiers	Events	Gold	Silver	Bronze	Total	Ranking
1992 Albertville	4	2/2	0	0	0	0	
1994 Lillehammer	4	2/2	0	0	0	0	
1998 Nagano	4	2/2	0	0	0	0	
2002 Salt Lake City	2	2/3	0	0	0	0	
2006 Turin	1	2/3	0	0	0	0	
2014 Sochi	3	2/3	0	0	0	0	
2018 Pyeongchang	2	2/3	0	0	0	0	
2022 Beijing	1	1/3	0	0	0	0	
Total			0	0	0	0	–

=== Ski jumping ===
Ski jumping has been included in the Olympic programme since the inaugural 1924 Winter Games.

Estonia's best placement in the sport was 23rd by Jens Salumäe in men's individual large hill in 2006.

Estonia has yet to participate in women's events in the sport.

Games	Ski jumpers	Events	Gold	Silver	Bronze	Total	Ranking
2002 Salt Lake City	3	2/3	0	0	0	0	
2006 Turin	2	2/3	0	0	0	0	
2014 Sochi	2	2/4	0	0	0	0	
2018 Pyeongchang	3	2/4	0	0	0	0	
2022 Beijing	2	2/5	0	0	0	0	
Total			0	0	0	0	–

=== Speed skating ===
Speed skating has been included in the Olympic programme since the inaugural 1924 Winter Olympics.

Estonia's best placement in the sport was 4th by Saskia Alusalu in women's mass start in 2018.

Estonia's best placement in a men's event in the sport was 7th by Marten Liiv in men's 1000m in 2022.

Games	Skaters	Events	Gold	Silver	Bronze	Total	Ranking
1928 St. Moritz	2	3/4	0	0	0	0	
1936 Garmisch-Partenkirchen	1	4/4	0	0	0	0	
2018 Pyeongchang	2	3/14	0	0	0	0	
2022 Beijing	1	2/14	0	0	0	0	
Total			0	0	0	0	–

== See also ==
- List of flag bearers for Estonia at the Olympics
- Category:Olympic competitors for Estonia
- Estonia at the Paralympics
