= Estonia at the 1992 Winter Olympics =

- IOC code: EST
- NOC: Estonian Olympic Committee
- Website: www.eok.ee (in Estonian)

in Albertville
- Competitors: 19 in 4 sports
- Flag bearer: Ants Antson
- Medals: Gold 0 Silver 0 Bronze 0 Total 0

Winter Olympics appearances (overview)
- 1928; 1932; 1936; 1948–1988; 1992; 1994; 1998; 2002; 2006; 2010; 2014; 2018; 2022; 2026

Other related appearances
- Soviet Union (1956–1988)

Estonia competed at the 1992 Winter Olympics in Albertville, France. It was the first time since 1936 that the nation had competed as an independent nation at the Winter Olympic Games. Estonian athletes competed for the Soviet Union from 1956 to 1988. Estonian National Olympic Representative was Tiit Nuudi and Estonian Olympic Team attaché was Ene Balder.

== Competitors ==
The following is the list of number of competitors in the Games.

Sport	Men	Women	Total
Biathlon	5	3	8
Cross-country skiing	5	1	6
Figure skating	0	1	1
Nordic combined	4	–	4
Total	14	5	19

Estonia also had a competitor at the demonstration event speed skiing (Aare Tamme).

== Biathlon ==
Men

Athlete	Event	Final		
Athlete	Event	Time	Misses	Rank
Urmas Kaldvee	Individual	1:03:15.1	4	48
Urmas Kaldvee	Sprint	27:52.9	1	31
Kristjan Oja	Individual	1:04:15.9	3	57
Kalju Ojaste	Individual	1:02:05.8	2	37
Kalju Ojaste	Sprint	29:13.2	1	59
Aivo Udras	Individual	1:00:14.5	3	16
Aivo Udras	Sprint	29:28.4	2	61
Hillar Zahkna	Individual	1:01:57.4	4	34
Hillar Zahkna	Sprint	27:46.5	2	27
Hillar Zahkna; Aivo Udras; Kalju Ojaste; Urmas Kaldvee	Relay	1:29:46.1	0	11

Women

Athlete	Event	Final		
Athlete	Event	Time	Misses	Rank
Krista Lepik	Individual	53:51.4	1	11
Krista Lepik	Sprint	28:16.6	4	42
Eveli Peterson	Individual	58:03.1	5	36
Eveli Peterson	Sprint	29:31.4	5	58
Jelena Poljakova	Individual	58:30.1	5	39
Jelena Poljakova	Sprint	27:22.8	1	30
Jelena Poljakova; Eveli Peterson; Krista Lepik	Relay	1:23:16.2	1	9

== Cross-country skiing ==
Men

Athlete	Event	Race	
Athlete	Event	Time	Rank
Elmo Kassin	10 km classical	29:52.0	22
Elmo Kassin	15 km freestyle pursuit	41:16.1	18
Elmo Kassin	50 km freestyle	2:19:29.3	45
Taivo Kuus	10 km classical	32:28.0	67
Taivo Kuus	15 km freestyle pursuit	46:18.6	60
Taivo Kuus	50 km freestyle	Did not finish	
Andrus Veerpalu	10 km classical	29:51.5	21
Andrus Veerpalu	15 km freestyle pursuit	43:41.7	42
Andrus Veerpalu	30 km classical	1:31:06.1	44
Urmas Välbe	10 km classical	30:20.1	28
Urmas Välbe	15 km freestyle pursuit	43:38.4	41
Urmas Välbe	30 km classical	1:29:44.3	33
Jaanus Teppan	30 km classical	1:29:30.9	31
Jaanus Teppan	50 km freestyle	2:17:15.1	39
Andrus Veerpalu; Jaanus Teppan; Elmo Kassin; Urmas Välbe	4x10 km relay	1:46:33.3	10

Women

Athlete	Event	Race	
Athlete	Event	Time	Rank
Piret Niglas	5 km classical	15:54.9	38
Piret Niglas	10 km freestyle pursuit	31:36.6	45
Piret Niglas	15 km classical	48:58.4	39
Piret Niglas	30 km freestyle	1:37:31.8	48

== Figure skating ==
Athlete(s)	Event	CD1	CD2	SP/OD	FS/FD	Total	
Athlete(s)	Event	FP	FP	FP	FP	TFP	Rank
Olga Vassiljeva	Ladies'	—		21 Q	21	31.5	21

== Nordic combined ==
Athlete	Event	Ski jumping		Cross-country		
Athlete	Event	Points	Rank	Deficit	Time	Rank
Peter Heli	Individual	182.0	38	+5:10.0	51:25.1 +6:57.0	31
Allar Levandi	Individual	206.4	14	+2:27.4	46:02.2 +1:34.1	6
Ago Markvardt	Individual	199.0	23	+3:16.7	49:38.6 +5:10.5	23
Toomas Tiru	Individual	170.9	44	+6:24.0	56:37.1 +12:09.0	42
Ago Markvardt; Peter Heli; Allar Levandi	Team	525.9	10	+9:56	1:33:16.9 +9:40.4	9
