= Estonia at the 1994 Winter Olympics =

- IOC code: EST
- NOC: Estonian Olympic Committee
- Website: www.eok.ee (in Estonian)

in Lillehammer
- Competitors: 26 in 6 sports
- Flag bearer: Allar Levandi
- Medals: Gold 0 Silver 0 Bronze 0 Total 0

Winter Olympics appearances (overview)
- 1928; 1932; 1936; 1948–1988; 1992; 1994; 1998; 2002; 2006; 2010; 2014; 2018; 2022; 2026

Other related appearances
- Soviet Union (1956–1988)

Estonia competed at the 1994 Winter Olympics in Lillehammer, Norway.

== Competitors ==
The following is the list of number of competitors in the Games.

Sport	Men	Women	Total
Alpine skiing	1	0	1
Biathlon	5	4	9
Cross-country skiing	6	4	10
Figure skating	1	0	1
Luge	0	1	1
Nordic combined	4	–	4
Total	17	9	26

== Alpine skiing ==
Men

Athlete	Event	Final				
Athlete	Event	Run 1	Run 2	Run 3	Total	Rank
Connor O'Brien	Downhill				Did Not Finish	

== Biathlon ==
Men

Athlete	Event	Final		
Athlete	Event	Time	Pen.	Rank
Urmas Kaldvee	20 km Individual	1:05:23.2	7	61
Olaf Mihelson	10 km Sprint	32:30.7	3	58
Kalju Ojaste	20 km Individual	1:11:21.4	10	69
Aivo Udras	10 km Sprint	32:02.1	4	50
Aivo Udras	20 km Individual	1:00:14.5	3	16
Hillar Zahkna	10 km Sprint	31:28.7	3	39
Olaf Mihelson; Urmas Kaldvee; Aivo Udras; Kalju Ojaste	4 × 7.5 km relay	1:35:43.3	3	13

Women

Athlete	Event	Final		
Athlete	Event	Time	Pen.	Rank
Krista Lepik	7.5 km Sprint	29:40.1	5	58
Krista Lepik	15 km Individual	58:54.9	5	42
Eveli Peterson	7.5 km Sprint	28:03.8	1	31
Eveli Peterson	15 km Individual	56:11.0	3	27
Jelena Všivtseva	7.5 km Sprint	29:35.3	3	56
Jelena Všivtseva	15 km Individual	59:50.1	6	53
Jelena Všivtseva; Eveli Peterson; Krista Lepik; Merle Viirmaa	4 × 7.5 km relay	1:59:30.4	2	12

== Cross-country skiing ==
Men

Athlete	Event	Final					
Athlete	Event	Start	Rank	Time	Rank	Total	Rank
Elmo Kassin	10 km Classical					26:40.9	33
Elmo Kassin	15 km Free Pursuit	+02:20	33	38:14.9	23	+4:46.1	25
Elmo Kassin	30 km Free					1:17:37.7	16
Taivo Kuus	30 km Free					1:25:52.3	63
Taivo Kuus	50 km Classical					2:19:51.9	36
Jaak Mae	10 km Classical					26:42.7	35
Jaak Mae	15 km Free Pursuit	+02:22	35	39:24.0	40	+5:57.2	40
Jaak Mae	30 km Free					1:24:24.1	59
Jaanus Teppan	50 km Classical					2:16:18.8	22
Urmas Välbe	10 km Classical					26:58.4	42
Urmas Välbe	15 km Free Pursuit	+02:38	42	DNF		DNF	
Urmas Välbe	30 km Free					1:21:02.5	41
Andrus Veerpalu	10 km Classical					26:45.8	36
Andrus Veerpalu	15 km Free Pursuit	+02:25	36	41:31.1	65	+8:07.3	55
Andrus Veerpalu	50 km Classical					2:17:24.7	26
Jaak Mae; Jaanus Teppan; Elmo Kassin; Taivo Kuus	4 × 10 km Relay					1:48:57.6	11

Women

Athlete	Event	Final					
Athlete	Event	Start	Rank	Time	Rank	Total	Rank
Piret Niglas	5 km Classical					15:20.9	22
Piret Niglas	10 km Free Pursuit	+01:21	22	30:12.5	28	+4:03.4	26
Piret Niglas	15 km Free					44:48.3	23
Piret Niglas	30 km Classical					1:33:09.3	29
Kristina Šmigun	5 km Classical					15:46.1	30
Kristina Šmigun	10 km Free Pursuit	+01:38	30	30:13.4	29	+4:19.3	27
Kristina Šmigun	15 km Free					45:21.1	28
Silja Suija	5 km Classical					16:07.8	39
Silja Suija	10 km Free Pursuit	+01:59	39	31:56.3	46	+6:25.2	46
Silja Suija	15 km Free					47:47.5	49
Cristel Vahtra	5 km Classical					15:42.3	27
Cristel Vahtra	10 km Free Pursuit	+01:34	27	31:58.3	47	+6:02.2	42
Cristel Vahtra	15 km Free					47:04.1	45
Cristel Vahtra	30 km Classical					1:34:48.6	35
Kristina Šmigun; Cristel Vahtra; Silja Suija; Piret Niglas	4 × 5 km Relay					1:02:32.4	12

== Figure skating ==
Men

Athlete	Final				
Athlete	Short Program	Rank	Free Skating	Total	Rank
Margus Hernits	12.5	25	Did not advance		

== Luge ==
Athlete	Event	Final					
Athlete	Event	Run 1	Run 2	Run 3	Run 4	Total	Rank
Helen Novikov	Women's singles	50.160	50.172	49.808	50.193	3:20.333	19

== Nordic combined ==
Athlete	Event	First Round		Second Round			Cross-country				
Athlete	Event	Points	Rank	Points	Total	Rank	Start	Time	Rank	Total	Rank
Ilmar Aluvee	Individual event	81.5	46	85.5	167.0	47	+08:53	39:56.8	18	48:49.8	39
Magnar Freimuth	Individual event	93.5	36	90.0	183.5	37	+07:03	39:55.0	17	46:58.0	24
Allar Levandi	Individual event	101.0	22	96.5	197.5	21	+05:30	38:50.9	3	44:20.9	12
Ago Markvardt	Individual event	123.0	2	120.5	243.5	2	+00:23	41:26.8	35	41:49.8	5
Allar Levandi; Ago Markvardt; Magnar Freimuth	Team event	317.5	5	301.5	619.0	4	+09:32	1:23:35.4	5	1:33:07.4	4
