= List of flag bearers for Estonia at the Olympics =

Estonia at the Olympics
- IOC code: EST
- NOC: Estonian Olympic Committee
- Website: www.eok.ee (in Estonian)
- Medals: Gold 14 Silver 12 Bronze 19 Total 45

Summer appearances
- 1920; 1924; 1928; 1932; 1936; 1948–1988; 1992; 1996; 2000; 2004; 2008; 2012; 2016; 2020; 2024

Winter appearances
- 1928; 1932; 1936; 1948–1988; 1992; 1994; 1998; 2002; 2006; 2010; 2014; 2018; 2022; 2026

Other related appearances
- Russian Empire (1908–1912); Soviet Union (1952–1988)

This is a list of flag bearers who have represented Estonia at the Olympics.

== Opening ceremony ==
Flag bearers carry the national flag of their country at the opening ceremony of the Olympic Games.

#	Event year	Season	Flag bearer	Sport
1	1920	Summer	Harald Tammer	Athletics (track and field) – shot put
2	1924	Summer	Jüri Lossman	Athletics (track and field) – marathon
3	1928	Winter	Eduard Hiiop	Representative
4	1928	Summer	Gustav Kalkun	Athletics (track and field) – discus throw
5	1932	Summer	Osvald Käpp	Wrestling
6	1936	Winter	Johannes Raudava	DNC
7	1936	Summer	Erich Altosaar	Basketball
8	1992	Winter	Ants Antson	DNC
9	1992	Summer	Heino Lipp	DNC
10	1994	Winter	Allar Levandi	Nordic combined
11	1996	Summer	Jüri Jaanson	Rowing
12	1998	Winter	Kalju Ojaste	Biathlon
13	2000	Summer	Tõnu Tõniste	Sailing
14	2002	Winter	Allar Levandi	DNC
15	2004	Summer	Erki Nool	Athletics (track and field) – decathlon
16	2006	Winter	Eveli Saue	Biathlon
17	2008	Summer	Martin Padar	Judo
18	2010	Winter	Roland Lessing	Biathlon
19	2012	Summer	Aleksander Tammert	Athletics (track and field) – discus throw
20	2014	Winter	Indrek Tobreluts	Biathlon
21	2016	Summer	Karl-Martin Rammo	Sailing
22	2018	Winter	Saskia Alusalu	Speed skating
23	2020	Summer	Dina Ellermann	Equestrian
23	2020	Summer	Tõnu Endrekson	Rowing
24	2022	Winter	Martin Himma	Cross-country skiing
24	2022	Winter	Kelly Sildaru	Freestyle skiing
25	2024	Summer	Klen Kaljulaid	Judo
25	2024	Summer	Reena Pärnat	Archery

== See also ==
- Estonia at the Olympics
