= Zoom 8 World Championships =

Youth Class Sailing World Championship

The Zoom 8 World Championships is an annual international sailing regatta for Zoom 8 dinghy they are organized by the host club on behalf of the International Class Association and recognized by World Sailing, the sports IOC recognized governing body.

== Events ==
Event			Host			Participation				Ref.
Ed.	Dates	Year	Host club	Location	Country	Gender	No.	Nat.	Cont	Ref.
1		2002		Lake Balaton	Hungary	Male	38	10	2	
1		2002		Lake Balaton	Hungary	Female	16	8	1	
2		2003		Maubuisson	France	Male				
2		2003		Maubuisson	France	Female				
3		2004		Hoorn	Netherlands	Male	82	14	2	
3		2004		Hoorn	Netherlands	Female	43	15	2	
4		2005		Barth	Germany	Male				
4		2005		Barth	Germany	Female				
5		2006	Sejlklubben Køge Bugt	Hundige Havn, Greve	Denmark	Male	83	10	1	
5		2006	Sejlklubben Køge Bugt	Hundige Havn, Greve	Denmark	Female	53	11	1	
6		2007		Lake Achen	Austria	Male				
6		2007		Lake Achen	Austria	Female				
7		2008	Tønsberg Seilforening	Tønsberg	Norway	Male	97	8	1	
7		2008	Tønsberg Seilforening	Tønsberg	Norway	Female	77	7	1	
8		2009		Träslövsläge	Sweden	Male				
8		2009		Träslövsläge	Sweden	Female				
9		2010	Tallinn Yacht Club	Lohusalu	Estonia	Male	77	8	1	
9		2010	Tallinn Yacht Club	Lohusalu	Estonia	Female	52	7	1	
10		2011		Hanko	Finland	Male	71	10	4	
10		2011		Hanko	Finland	Female	42	7	1	
11		2012	Royal Swedish Yacht Club (KSSS)	Stockholm	Sweden	Male	86	8	1	
11		2012	Royal Swedish Yacht Club (KSSS)	Stockholm	Sweden	Female	53	7	1	
12		2013	Ran Seilforening	Straume, Fjell Municipality	Norway	Male	47	7	1	
12		2013	Ran Seilforening	Straume, Fjell Municipality	Norway	Female	36	7	1	
13		2014	Kaløvig Bådelaug	Åstrup	Denmark	Male	69	8	2	
13		2014	Kaløvig Bådelaug	Åstrup	Denmark	Female	59	7	1	
14		2015		Wolfgangsee	Austria	Male	47	7	1	
14		2015		Wolfgangsee	Austria	Female	60	7	1	
15		2016		Kuressaare	Estonia	Male	65	9	2	
15		2016		Kuressaare	Estonia	Female	55	8	2	
16		2017			Sweden	Male	66	6	1	
16		2017			Sweden	Female	47	6	1	
17		2018		Lohja	Finland	Male	49	7	2	
17		2018		Lohja	Finland	Female	43	7	2	
18		2019	Circolo Vela Arco	Garda	Italy	Male	52	6	1	
18		2019	Circolo Vela Arco	Garda	Italy	Female				
N/A		2020	Yachtklubben Furesøen	Holte, Copenhagen	Denmark	CANCELED COVID				
19		2021	Yachtklubben Furesøen	Holte, Copenhagen	Denmark	Male	28	4	1	
19		2021	Yachtklubben Furesøen	Holte, Copenhagen	Denmark	Female	39	5	1	
20		2022	Tilgu Marina Yacht Club / Kuusalu Yacht Club	Tilgu	Estonia	Male	30	6	2	
20		2022	Tilgu Marina Yacht Club / Kuusalu Yacht Club	Tilgu	Estonia	Female	33	4	1	
21		2023	Turku Yacht Club	Turku, Finland	Finland	Male	20	4	1	
21		2023	Turku Yacht Club	Turku, Finland	Finland	Female	24	4	1	
22		2024	Warnemünde Woche	Warnemünde	Germany	Open	56	6	1	
23		2025	Warnemünde Woche	Warnemünde	Germany	Open	38	5	1	
23		2026	Warnemünde Woche	Warnemünde	Germany	Open	21	4	1	

== Male World Champion ==
Year	Gold	Silver	Bronze
2002	Karl-Martin Rammo (EST)	Marko-Kustav Lilienthal (EST)	Emil Borresen (DEN)
2003	Charlie Ekberg (SWE)		
2004	Fredrik Schraam (SWE)	Gustav Dahlborg (SWE)	Frederik Thaarup (DEN)
2005	Fredrik Thaarup (DEN)		
2006	Magnus Kældsø (DEN)	Christian Andersen (DEN)	Lasse Børresen (DEN)
2007	Thomas Palme (AUT)	Jon Alexander Hvam (NOR)	Rasi Bajons (AUT)
2008	Thomas Palme (AUT)	Bror Tobiasen (DEN)	Brian Nørgaard (DEN)
2009	Mathias Haugstad (NOR)		
2010	Carsten Faubel (DEN)	Victor Silen (FIN)	Alexender Shelting (RUS)
2011	Pontus Dahl (SWE)	Victor Silen (FIN)	Alexander Gronblom (FIN)
2012	Simon Weideskog (SWE)	Juuso Roihu (EST)	Victor Silén (FIN)
2013	David Bjelkarøy Westervik (NOR)	Alexander Dahl Høgheim (NOR)	Martin Õunap (EST)
2014	Sophus Jarvig (DEN)	Pontus Karlsson (SWE)	Sebastian Norup (DEN)
2015	Niclas Lehmann (AUT)	Oliver Ørting (DEN)	Jakob Haud (EST)
2016	Ilari Muhonen (FIN)	Christoffer Sörlie (NOR)	Lucas Karlemo (FIN)
2017	Jakob Haud (EST)	Lucas Karlemo (FIN)	Dmitry Golovkin (RUS)
2018	Lasse Lindell (FIN)	Simon Karlemo (FIN)	William Karsson (SWE)
2019	William Aasholm-Bradley (DEN)	Gustav Aasholm-Bradley (DEN)	Aleksander Kuusik (25x17px)
2021	Laurenz Haselberger (AUT)	Alexander Hagefors (SWE)	Victor Møller Thygesen (DEN)
2022	Martin Rahnel (EST)	Rasmus Randmäe (EST)	Kaito Haamer (EST)
2023	Nikolaj Jakobsen (DEN)	Karl Veetõusme (EST)	Toke Scheuer Jansen (DEN)
2024	Alfred Heinemeier Madsen (DEN)	Kåre Thybo Kavin (DEN)	Toke Scheuer Jansen (DEN)

== Female World Champion ==
Year	Gold	Silver	Bronze
2002	Karolina Wolniewicz (POL)	Klaudia Matis (HUN)	Piret Pomerants (EST)
2003	Karolina Wolniewicz (POL)		
2004	Maria Rudskaja (RUS)	Lisa Stadler (AUT)	Caroline Schramm (SWE)
2005	Maria Rudskava (RUS)		
2006	Henriette Søster Frislev (DEN)	Maria Rudsakya (RUS)	Louise Christensen (DEN)
2007	Lena Hess (AUT)	Ingrid K. Nordaas (NOR)	Elisabeth Smolka (AUT)
2008	Lena Hess (AUT)	Laerke Buhl-Hansen (DEN)	Ingrid Kvåle Nordaas (NOR)
2009	Trine Bentzen (DEN)		
2010	Noora Ruskola (FIN)	Helene Mjelde Gjerde (NOR)	Hanna Johansson (SWE)
2011	Anna Munch (DEN)	Valentina Faihs (AUT)	Dopping Jacqueline (DEN)
2012	Anna Munch (DEN)	Ella von Melen (SWE)	Signe Søgaard Hansen (DEN)
2013	Catharina Sandman (FIN)	Saara Tukiainen (FIN)	Emilie Homstvedt (NOR)
2014	Ronja Grönblom (FIN)	Ebru Bolat (ROU)	Julie Havn (DEN)
2015	Anna Rupp (AUT)	Marie Pihlas (EST)	Jenny Hammersland (SWE)
2016	Cecilia Dahlberg (FIN)	Emma Grönblom (FIN)	Sofia Tynkkynen (FIN)
2017	Lilian TANHUANPÄÄ (FIN)	Arina LATYNINA (RUS)	Emma GRÖNBLOM (FIN)
2018	Angeliina Maria Isabel Õunap (EST)	Sofia Held (FIN)	Xiaojian Keinänen (CHN)
2019	Karolin Härm (EST)	Sofia Held (FIN)	Elisabeth Ristmets (EST)
2021	Karolin Härm (EST)	Elisabeth Ristmets (EST)	Madita Grigat (DEN)
2022	Elisabeth Ristmets (EST)	Britta Maipuu (EST)	Maja Brønlund Olesen (DEN)
2023	Maja Brønlund Olesen (DEN)	Emilie Vesteroe Nielsen (DEN)	Mia Maria Lipsmäe (EST)

== Open World Champion ==
Year	Gold	Silver	Bronze	1st
2024	Alfred Heinemeier Madsen (DEN)	Kåre Thybo Kavin (DEN)	Laura Marii Taggu (EST)	3rd / Laura Marii Taggu (EST)
2025	Sisu Seliö (FIN)	Leon Zolotarjov (EST)	Johan Gundborg (DEN)	6th / Safina Linnau (DEN)
2026	Jakob Gsell (AUT)	Emily Kargl (AUT)	Tora Aviaya Hammershøj CALLESEN (DEN)	2nd / Emily Kargl (AUT)
