= Zoom 8 =

International racing sailing class

Boat
- Crew: 1

Hull
- Hull weight: 44 kilograms (97 lb) with fittings
- LOA: 2.65 metres (8 ft 8 in)
- Beam: 1.45 metres (4 ft 9 in)

Sails
- Mainsail area: 4.9 square metres (53 sq ft)

The Zoom^{8} is a youth racing dinghy that sailed in Denmark, Sweden, Norway, Finland, Austria, the Netherlands, Estonia, Latvia, and Russia. It is designed by the Finn Henrik Segercrantz. The Zoom^{8} is considered an excellent transition dinghy from the Optimist and the more physically demanding dinghies such as the Laser, Europe and 29er, and although many attempts have been made by other classes to fill this gap, the Zoom^{8} dinghy is one of the few to have succeeded.

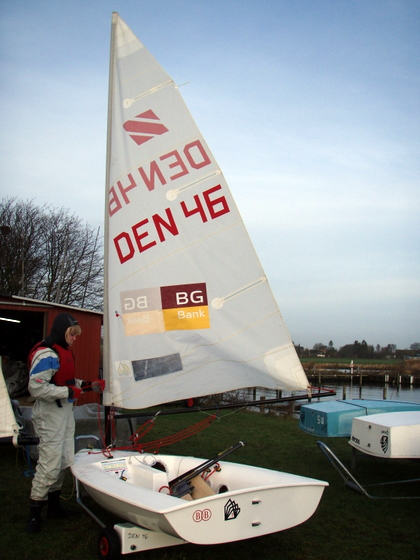
Zoom^{8} on shore

The Swedish Zoom^{8} Association note that the Zoom ^{8} is a calm, safe boat and simple enough that beginners can sail it.

The Zoom^{8} has been spread all over Sweden since 1995 followed a few years later by Denmark and these two countries have won numerous medals in the European and World Championships.

== World Championship ==
=== Open World Champion ===
- 2002, Lake Balaton, Hungary – Karolina Wolniewicz (POL) and Karl-Martin Rammo (EST)
- 2003, Maubuisson, France – Karolina Wolniewicz (POL) and Charlie Ekberg (SWE)
- 2004, Hoorn, Netherlands – Maria Rudskaja (RUS) and Fredrik Schraam (SWE)
- 2005, Barth, Germany – Maria Rudskava (RUS) and Fredrik Thaarup (DEN)
- 2006, Hundige Havn, Greve, Denmark – Henriette Søster Frislev (DEN) and Magnus Kældsø (DEN)
- 2007, Lake Achen, Austria – Lena Hess (AUT) and Thomas Palme (AUT)
- 2008, Tønsberg, Norway – Lena Hess (AUT) and Thomas Palme (AUT)
- 2009, Träslövsläge, Sweden – Trine Bentzen (DEN) and Mathias Haugstad (NOR)

=== Male World Champion ===
Year	Gold	Silver	Bronze
2010, Tallinn Yacht Club, Lohusalu, Estonia	Carsten Faubel (DEN)	Carsten F.FaubelVictor Silen (FIN)	Alexender Shelting (RUS)
2011, Hanko, Finland, 71 Entries	Pontus Dahl (SWE)	Victor Silen (FIN)	Alexander Gronblom (FIN)
2012, KSSS, Stockholm, Sweden	Simon Weideskog (SWE)	Juuso Roihu (EST)	Victor Silén (FIN)
2013, Ran Seilforening, Straume, Fjell Municipality, Norway	David Bjelkarøy Westervik (NOR)	Alexander Dahl Høgheim (NOR)	Martin Õunap (EST)
2014, Åstrup, Denmark	Sophus Jarvig (DEN)	Pontus Karlsson (SWE)	Sebastian Norup (DEN)
2015, Wolfgangsee, Austria	(25x17px)	(25x17px)	(25x17px)
2016, Kuressaare, Estonia	Ilari Muhonen (FIN)	Christoffer Sörlie (NOR)	Lucas Karlemo (FIN)
2017, Sweden	Jakob Haud (EST)	Lucas Karlemo (FIN)	Dmitry Golovkin (RUS)
2018, Lohja, Finland	Lasse Lindell (FIN)	Simon Karlemo (FIN)	William Karsson (SWE)
2019, Garda, Italy	William Aasholm-Bradley (DEN)	Gustav Aasholm-Bradley (DEN)	Aleksander Kuusik (25x17px)
2021, Furesøen, Denmark	Laurenz Haselberger (AUT)	Alexander Hagefors (SWE)	Victor Møller Thygesen (DEN)
2022, Tilgu, Estonia	Martin Rahnel (EST)	Rasmus Randmäe (EST)	Kaito Haamer (EST)
2023, Turku, Finland	Nikolaj Jakobsen (DEN)	Karl Veetõusme (EST)	Toke Scheuer Jansen (DEN)
2024, Warnemünde, Germany	Alfred Heinemeier Madsen (DEN)	Kåre Thybo Kavin (DEN)	Toke Scheuer Jansen (DEN)

=== Female World Champion ===
Year	Gold	Silver	Bronze
2010, Tallinn Yacht Club, Lohusalu, Estonia	Noora Ruskola (FIN)	Helene Mjelde Gjerde (NOR)	Hanna Johansson (SWE)
2011, Hanko, Finland; 42 Entries	Anna Munch (DEN)	Valentina Faihs (AUT)	Dopping Jacqueline (DEN)
2012, KSSS, Stockholm, Sweden	Anna Munch (DEN)	Ella von Melen (SWE)	Signe Søgaard Hansen (DEN)
2013, Ran Seilforening, Straume, Fjell Municipality, Norway, 38 Entries	Catharina Sandman (FIN)	Saara Tukiainen (FIN)	Emilie Homstvedt (NOR)
2014, Åstrup, Denmark	Ronja Grönblom (FIN)	Ebru Bolat (ROU)	Julie Havn (DEN)
2015, Wolfgangsee, Austria	(25x17px)	(25x17px)	(25x17px)
2016, Kuressaare, Estonia	Cecilia Dahlberg (FIN)	Emma Grönblom (FIN)	Sofia Tynkkynen (FIN)
2017, Sweden	Lilian TANHUANPÄÄ (FIN)	Arina LATYNINA (RUS)	Emma GRÖNBLOM (FIN)
2018, Lohja, Finland	Angeliina Maria Isabel Õunap (EST)	Sofia Held (FIN)	Xiaojian Keinänen (CHN)
2019, Garda, Italy	Karolin Härm (EST)	Sofia Held (FIN)	Elisabeth Ristmets (EST)
2021, Furesøen, Denmark	Karolin Härm (EST)	Elisabeth Ristmets (EST)	Madita Grigat (DEN)
2022, Tilgu, Estonia	Elisabeth Ristmets (EST)	Britta Maipuu (EST)	Maja Brønlund Olesen (DEN)
2023, Turku, Finland	Maja Brønlund Olesen (DEN)	Emilie Vesteroe Nielsen (DEN)	Mia Maria Lipsmäe (EST)
2024, Warnemünde, Germany	Laura Marii Taggu (EST)	Mia Maria Lipsmäe (EST)	Trinette Välisson (EST)

== Manufacturers ==
- Børresen Bådebyggeri, Vejle, Denmark
- Altair Ruspol, St. Petersburg, Russia
- RMT Oy, Helsinki, Finland
