= Wynn Roberts =

Wynn Roberts may refer to:

- Wynn Roberts (actor) (1924–2021), Australian actor
- Wynn Roberts (biathlete) (born 1988), American biathlete
