= Estonia at the 2022 Winter Olympics =

- Flag of Estonia
- IOC code: EST
- NOC: Estonian Olympic Committee
- Website: www.eok.ee/en

in Beijing, China 4–20 February 2022
- Competitors: 26 (14 men and 12 women) in 8 sports
- Flag bearers (opening): Martin Himma; Kelly Sildaru
- Flag bearer (closing): Kelly Sildaru
- Medals Ranked 27th: Gold 0 Silver 0 Bronze 1 Total 1

Winter Olympics appearances (overview)
- 1928; 1932; 1936; 1948–1988; 1992; 1994; 1998; 2002; 2006; 2010; 2014; 2018; 2022; 2026

Other related appearances
- Soviet Union (1956–1988)

Estonia competed at the 2022 Winter Olympics in Beijing, China, from 4 to 20 February 2022. Estonian team consisted of 26 athletes.

Martin Himma and Kelly Sildaru were the country's flagbearer during the opening ceremony. Sildaru was also the flagbearer during the closing ceremony.

Kelly Sildaru won bronze in Women's slopestyle bringing Estonia the first medal on 2022 Winter Olympics and became Estonia's first Winter Olympic medalist since the Vancouver 2010.

== Medalists ==
Medal	Name	Sport	Event	Date
Bronze	Kelly Sildaru	Freestyle skiing	Women's slopestyle	February 15

== Competitors ==
The following is a list of the number of competitors participating at the Games per sport/discipline.

Sport	Men	Women	Total
Alpine skiing	1	1	2
Biathlon	4	4	8
Cross-country skiing	4	5	9
Figure skating	1	1	2
Freestyle skiing	0	1	1
Nordic combined	1	—N/a	1
Ski jumping	2	0	2
Speed skating	1	0	1
Total	14	12	26

== Alpine skiing ==
By meeting the basic qualification standards Estonia qualified one male and one female alpine skier.

Athlete	Event	Run 1		Run 2		Total	
Athlete	Event	Time	Rank	Time	Rank	Time	Rank
Tormis Laine	Men's giant slalom	DNF		Did not advance			
Tormis Laine	Men's slalom	DNF		Did not advance			
Katie Vesterstein	Women's giant slalom	1:05.39	43	1:05.05	34	2:10.44	35
Katie Vesterstein	Women's slalom	DNF		Did not advance			

== Biathlon ==
Estonia qualified four male and four female biathletes.

Men

Athlete	Event	Time	Misses	Rank
Kalev Ermits	Individual	57:21.3	6 (2+2+0+2)	78
Raido Ränkel	Individual	56:32.4	5 (0+2+1+2)	73
Kristo Siimer	Individual	55:32.7	3 (0+0+1+2)	60
Rene Zahkna	Individual	56:06.0	3 (0+0+1+2)	68
Raido Ränkel	Pursuit	46:23.1	6 (1+1+2+2)	47
Rene Zahkna	Pursuit	46:54.0	3 (0+0+2+1)	50
Kalev Ermits	Sprint	27:46.4	4 (2+2)	88
Raido Ränkel	Sprint	26:39.1	2 (0+2)	51
Kristo Siimer	Sprint	27:06.6	1 (1+0)	70
Rene Zahkna	Sprint	26:37.9	1 (0+1)	50
Rene Zahkna; Kristo Siimer; Kalev Ermits; Raido Ränkel	Team relay	1:26:03.6	2+12	15

Women

Athlete	Event	Time	Misses	Rank
Susan Külm	Individual	54:17.0	6 (2+2+1+1)	82
Regina Oja	Individual	53:53.7	7 (4+0+2+1)	79
Johanna Talihärm	Individual	51:59.5	3 (0+1+1+1)	66
Tuuli Tomingas	Individual	49:20.3	4 (0+1+1+2)	43
Susan Külm	Pursuit	40:57.3	3 (1+1+1+0)	45
Regina Oja	Pursuit	41:14.5	5 (3+1+0+1)	50
Johanna Talihärm	Pursuit	DNS		
Tuuli Tomingas	Pursuit	41:12.2	7 (0+2+3+2)	49
Susan Külm	Sprint	23:15.3	1 (0+1)	44
Regina Oja	Sprint	23:24.4	2 (1+1)	56
Johanna Talihärm	Sprint	23:13.3	0 (0+0)	43
Tuuli Tomingas	Sprint	22:49.2	2 (1+1)	33
Susan Külm; Regina Oja; Johanna Talihärm; Tuuli Tomingas	Team relay	LAP		15

Mixed

Athlete	Event	Time	Misses	Rank
Regina Oja; Kristo Siimer; Tuuli Tomingas; Rene Zahkna	Relay	1:11:56.5	1+14	16

== Cross-country skiing ==
Estonia qualified four male and five female cross-country skiers.

Distance

Athlete	Event	Classical		Freestyle		Final		
Athlete	Event	Time	Rank	Time	Rank	Time	Deficit	Rank
Alvar Johannes Alev	Men's 15 km classical	—N/a				41:12.5	+3:17.7	35
Martin Himma	Men's 15 km classical	—N/a				42:44.4	+4:49.6	56
Henri Roos	Men's 15 km classical	—N/a				44:17.8	+6:23.0	70
Alvar Johannes Alev	Men's 30 km skiathlon	42:08.8	36	41:08.3	38	1:23:50.5	+7:40.7	33
Alvar Johannes Alev	Men's 50 km freestyle	—N/a				1:16:28.4	+4:55.7	36
Alvar Johannes Alev; Martin Himma; Marko Kilp; Henri Roos	4 × 10 km relay	—N/a				LAP		15
Kaidy Kaasiku	Women's 10 km classical	—N/a				33:50.7	+5:44.4	70
Keidy Kaasiku	Women's 10 km classical	—N/a				32:55.4	+4:49.1	60
Aveli Uustalu	Women's 10 km classical	—N/a				35:46.2	+7:39.9	80
Kaidy Kaasiku	Women's 15 km skiathlon	27:02.9	55	24:32.7	51	52:12.6	+7:58.9	54
Keidy Kaasiku	Women's 15 km skiathlon	25:40.7	47	23:23.9	26	49:40.7	+5:27.0	39
Kaidy Kaasiku; Merlii Mariel; Keidy Kaasiku; Aveli Uustalu	Women's 4 x 5 km relay	—N/a				1:01:18.9	+7:37.9	16

Sprint
Men

Athlete	Event	Qualification		Quarterfinal		Semifinal		Final	
Athlete	Event	Time	Rank	Time	Rank	Time	Rank	Time	Rank
Martin Himma	Sprint	3:00.07	48	Did not advance					
Marko Kilp	Sprint	2:58.95	45	Did not advance					
Henri Roos	Sprint	2:57.15	41	Did not advance					
Martin Himma; Henri Roos	Team sprint	—N/a				20:24.29	5	Did not advance	11

Women

Athlete	Event	Qualification		Quarterfinal		Semifinal		Final	
Athlete	Event	Time	Rank	Time	Rank	Time	Rank	Time	Rank
Kaidy Kaasiku	Sprint	3:31.54	48	Did not advance					
Keidy Kaasiku	Sprint	3:36.82	62	Did not advance					
Mariel Merlii Pulles	Sprint	3:27.71	41	Did not advance					
Aveli Uustalu	Sprint	3:37.10	64	Did not advance					
Keidy Kaasiku; Mariel Merlii Pulles	Team sprint	—N/a				24:47.51	9	Did not advance	17

== Figure skating ==
In the 2021 World Figure Skating Championships in Stockholm, Sweden, Estonia secured one quota in both the men's and ladies singles competitions.

Singles

Athlete	Event	SP		FS		Total	
Athlete	Event	Points	Rank	Points	Rank	Points	Rank
Aleksandr Selevko	Men's	65.29	28	Did not advance			
Eva-Lotta Kiibus	Women's	59.55	21 Q	112.20	20	171.75	21

== Freestyle skiing ==
Kelly Sildaru is Estonia's qualifier in both Halfpipe and Slopestyle/Big Air.

Halfpipe

Athlete	Event	Qualification				Final				
Athlete	Event	Run 1	Run 2	Best	Rank	Run 1	Run 2	Run 3	Best	Rank
Kelly Sildaru	Women's halfpipe	87.50	DNS	87.50	3 Q	80.25	87.00	85.00	87.00	4

Slopestyle and Big air

Athlete	Event	Qualification					Final				
Athlete	Event	Run 1	Run 2	Run 3	Best	Rank	Run 1	Run 2	Run 3	Best/Total	Rank
Kelly Sildaru	Women's slopestyle	80.96	86.15	—N/a	86.15 Q	1	82.06	46.71	78.75	82.06	3rd place, bronze medalist(s)
Kelly Sildaru	Women's big air	40.25	85.25	~~28.00~~	125.50	17	Did not advance				

== Nordic combined ==
Estonia qualified one athlete.

Athlete	Event	Ski jumping			Cross-country		Total	
Athlete	Event	Distance	Points	Rank	Time	Rank	Time	Rank
Kristjan Ilves	Large hill/10 km	140.0	128.7	2	27:29.5	29	28:13.5	9

== Ski jumping ==
Estonia qualified two male ski jumpers.

Athlete	Event	Qualification			First round			Final			Total	
Athlete	Event	Distance	Points	Rank	Distance	Points	Rank	Distance	Points	Rank	Points	Rank
Artti Aigro	Large hill	117.0	102.0	31 Q	130.0	121.4	29	127.5	117.9	28	239.3	30
Kevin Maltsev	Large hill	113.0	94.3	41 Q	126.5	113.6	37	Did not advance				
Artti Aigro	Normal hill	86.0	80.0	33 Q	97.0	116.7	34	Did not advance				
Kevin Maltsev	Normal hill	89.5	80.2	32 Q	96.5	112.5	40	Did not advance				

== Speed skating ==
Estonian speed skater Marten Liiv qualified in both 500 and 1000 metres event.

Athlete	Event	Final	
Athlete	Event	Time	Rank
Marten Liiv	Men's 500 m	35.26	24
Marten Liiv	Men's 1000 m	1:08.65	7
