= Estonia at the 2010 Winter Olympics =

- IOC code: EST
- NOC: Estonian Olympic Committee
- Website: www.eok.ee (in Estonian)

in Vancouver
- Competitors: 30 (18 men, 12 women) in 4 sports
- Flag bearers: Roland Lessing (opening); Kristina Šmigun-Vähi (closing)
- Medals Ranked 25th: Gold 0 Silver 1 Bronze 0 Total 1

Winter Olympics appearances (overview)
- 1928; 1932; 1936; 1948–1988; 1992; 1994; 1998; 2002; 2006; 2010; 2014; 2018; 2022; 2026

Other related appearances
- Soviet Union (1956–1988)

Estonia competed at the XXI Olympic Winter Games in 2010 in Vancouver, British Columbia, Canada. These games are the eighth Winter Olympics games for Estonia.

Andrus Veerpalu as first Estonian six-time Winter Olympian, became the third cross-country skier in history to compete at six Winter Olympics, after Finns Marja-Liisa Kirvesniemi and Harri Kirvesniemi.

== Medalists ==
The following Estonian athletes won medals at the games:

Medal	Name	Sport	Event
Silver	Kristina Šmigun-Vähi	Cross-country skiing	Women's 10 kilometre freestyle

== Alpine skiing ==
Men

Athlete	Event	Run 1	Run 2	Total	Rank
Deyvid Oprja	Giant slalom	1:29.27	1:31.51	3:00.78	66
Deyvid Oprja	Slalom	Did not finish			

Women

Athlete	Event	Run 1	Run 2	Total	Rank
Tiiu Nurmberg	Giant slalom	Did not finish			
Tiiu Nurmberg	Slalom	58.91	59.08	1:57.99	42

== Biathlon ==
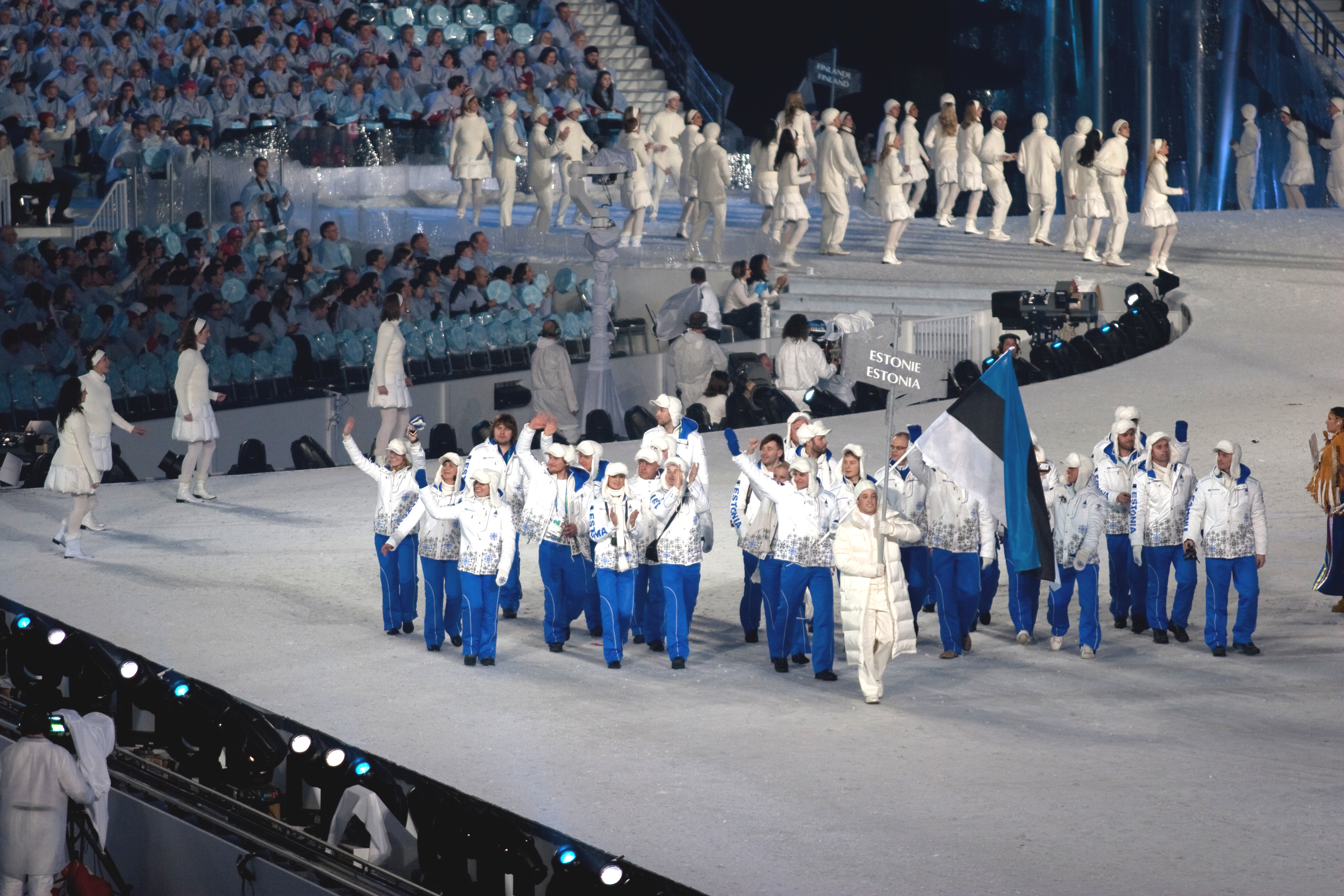
Estonian delegation at the Winter Olympics opening ceremony in Vancouver.

Men

Athlete	Event	Final		
Athlete	Event	Time	Misses	Rank
Martten Kaldvee	Individual	57:56.7	6	81
Martten Kaldvee	Sprint	28:07.7	3	74
Kauri Kõiv	Individual	53:22.4	3	44
Kauri Kõiv	Sprint	26:56.0	2	48
Kauri Kõiv	Pursuit	37:45.5	4	50
Roland Lessing	Individual	55:29.8	5	65
Roland Lessing	Sprint	27:26.0	3	62
Priit Viks	Individual	51:38.1	1	20
Indrek Tobreluts	Sprint	26:18.9	1	31
Indrek Tobreluts	Pursuit	37:29.0	5	48
Estonia; Priit Viks; Kauri Kõiv; Indrek Tobreluts; Roland Lessing	Relay	1:28:16.5; 21:07.1; 22:39.6; 21:35.5; 22:35.5	3+10; 0+3; 1+3; 0+4; 2+3	13

Women

Athlete	Event	Final		
Athlete	Event	Time	Misses	Rank
Kadri Lehtla	Individual	45:27.9	2	42
Kadri Lehtla	Sprint	22:34.2	2	64
Eveli Saue	Individual	45:27.9	2	42
Eveli Saue	Sprint	22:23.3	2	55
Eveli Saue	Pursuit	Lapped		
Sirli Hanni	Sprint	23:57.8	2	84
Kristel Viigipuu	Sprint	23:57.1	2	83
Estonia; Kadri Lehtla; Eveli Saue; Sirli Hanni; Kristel Viigipuu	Relay	1:17:55.5; 18:49.8; 18:15.4; 20:06.6; 20:43.7	2+16; 0+4; 0+2; 1+4; 1+6	18

== Cross-country skiing ==
Men

Athlete	Event	Qualification		Quarterfinals		Semifinals		Final	
Athlete	Event	Time	Rank	Time	Rank	Time	Rank	Time	Rank
Kein Einaste	Sprint	3:59.19	59	Did not qualify					59
Algo Kärp	50 km classical							2:13:49.6	41
Kaspar Kokk	30 km pursuit							1:22:40.3	42
Peeter Kümmel	Sprint	3:37.99	9 Q	3:42.4	3	Did not qualify			14
Jaak Mae	50 km classical							2:10:41.3	30
Aivar Rehemaa	15 km freestyle							36:13.5	51
Aivar Rehemaa	30 km pursuit							1:21:15.8	37
Aivar Rehemaa	50 km classical							2:10:57.6	34
Anti Saarepuu	Sprint	3:45.44	42	Did not qualify					42
Timo Simonlatser	Sprint	3:40.65	25 Q	3:42.2	6	Did not qualify			27
Karel Tammjärv	15 km freestyle							37:38.4	67
Karel Tammjärv	30 km pursuit							1:23:02.9	46
Andrus Veerpalu	50 km classical							2:05:41.6	6
Team	Event	Qualification		Quarterfinals		Semifinals		Final	
Team	Event	Time	Rank	Time	Rank	Time	Rank	Time	Rank
Peeter Kümmel, Anti Saarepuu	Team sprint					19:27.6	8	Did not advance	17
Algo Kärp, Kaspar Kokk, Jaak Mae, Aivar Rehemaa	4 x 10 km relay							1:51:41.2	14

Women

Athlete	Event	Qualification		Quarterfinals		Semifinals		Final	
Athlete	Event	Time	Rank	Time	Rank	Time	Rank	Time	Rank
Tatjana Mannima	10 km freestyle							28:13.0	58
Tatjana Mannima	15 km pursuit							44:24.2	44
Tatjana Mannima	30 kilometre classical							1:40:51.3	42
Triin Ojaste	Sprint	3:52.31	37	Did not qualify					37
Kristina Šmigun-Vähi	10 km freestyle							25:05.0	2nd place, silver medalist(s)
Kristina Šmigun-Vähi	15 km pursuit							Did not finish	
Kristina Šmigun-Vähi	30 kilometre classical							1:35:27.2	28
Kaija Udras	15 km pursuit							Did not finish	
Kaija Udras	Sprint	3:51.05	31	Did not qualify					31
Team	Event	Qualification		Quarterfinals		Semifinals		Final	
Team	Event	Time	Rank	Time	Rank	Time	Rank	Time	Rank
Triin Ojaste, Kaija Udras	Team sprint					20:02.2	8	Did not advance	16

== Figure skating ==
Estonia qualified 1 entrant in ladies singles, 1 in pair skating, and 1 in ice dancing, for a total of 5 athletes.

Athlete(s)	Event	CD		SP/OD		FS/FD		Total	
Athlete(s)	Event	Points	Rank	Points	Rank	Points	Rank	Points	Rank
Jelena Glebova	Ladies'			50.80	20	83.39	22	134.19	21
Maria Sergejeva / Ilja Glebov	Pairs			42.18	18	82.72	19	124.90	19
Irina Štork / Taavi Rand	Ice dancing	21.73	23	35.21	23	58.24	23	115.18	23
