= Kaspars Dumbris =

Latvian biathlete (born 1985)

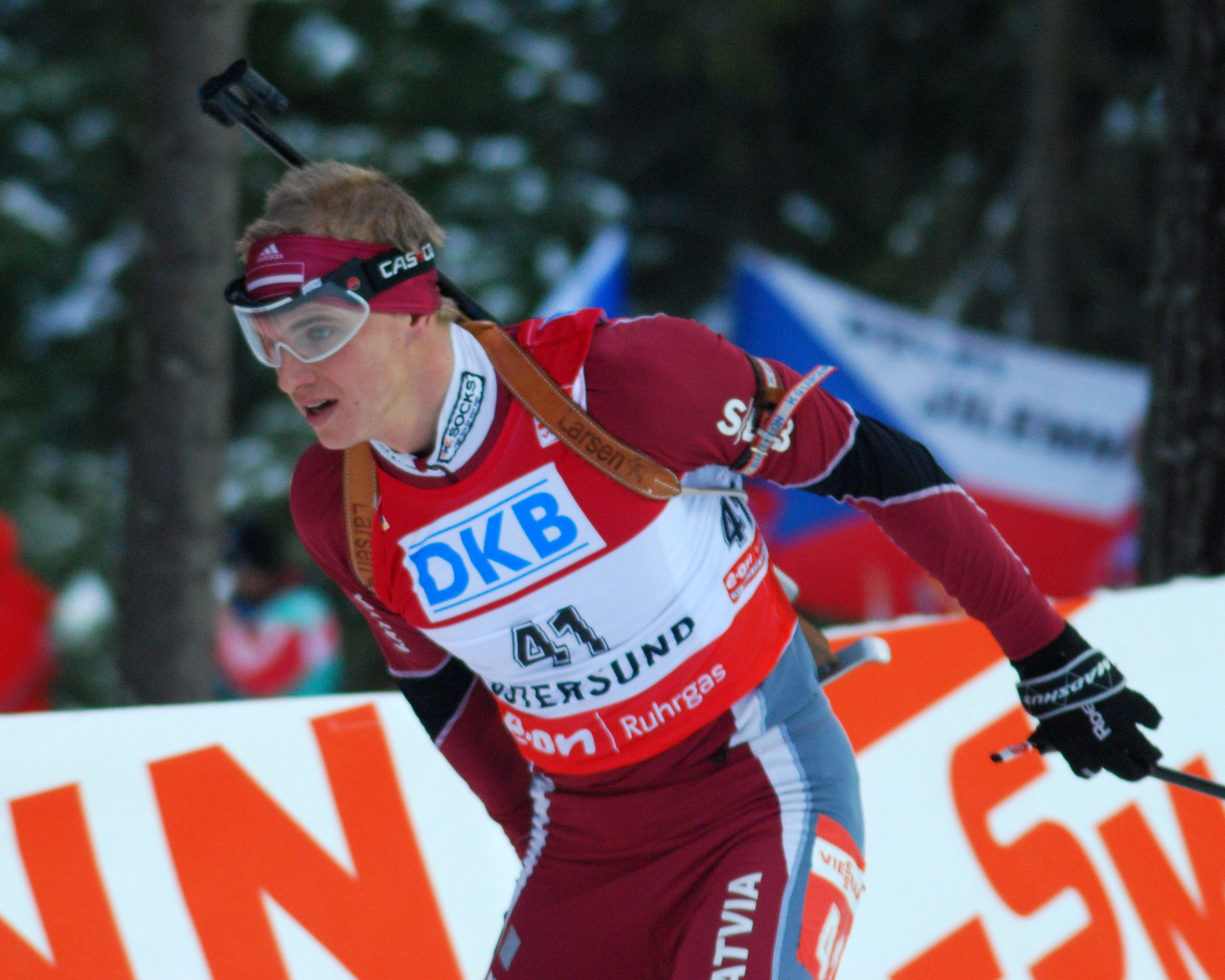
- Latvian biathlete Kaspars Dumbris during the World Championships in Östersund 2008.

Personal information
- Born: 25 February 1985 Cēsis, Latvian SSR, Soviet Union
- Height: 192 cm (6 ft 4 in)

Sport
- Sport: Skiing
- Updated on 28 February 2013

Kaspars Dumbris (born 25 February 1985 in Cēsis) is a retired Latvian biathlete.

He competed in the 2010 Winter Olympics for Latvia. His lone race was the individual, where he finished 73rd.

As of February 2013, his best performance at the Biathlon World Championships, is 12th, in the 2007 men's relay. His best individual performance is 41st, in the 2008 sprint.

As of February 2013, his best Biathlon World Cup finish is 7th, as part of the Latvian men's relay team at Oberhof in 2009/10. His best individual finish is 48th, in the individual at Pokljuka in 2007/08.
