= Karl-Martin Rammo =

Estonian sailor (born 1989)

Personal information
- Born: 6 June 1989 (age 37) Tallinn, then part of Estonian SSR, Soviet Union
- Height: 190 cm (6 ft 3 in)
- Weight: 82 kg (181 lb)

Sport

Sailing career
- Class(es): ILCA 7, ILCA 6, Zoom 8

Karl-Martin Rammo (born 6 June 1989) is an Estonian sailor, born in Tallinn. He competed at the 2012 Summer Olympics in the Men's Laser class. He was the world champion in the Zoom 8 class in 2002. After the 2024 Summer Olympics, he retired from professional sports sailing.

At the 2016 Summer Olympics in Rio de Janeiro he competed in the Men's Laser class. He was the flagbearer for Estonia during the Parade of Nations.

Summer Olympics
Preceded by Aleksander Tammert	Flagbearer for Estonia; Rio de Janeiro 2016	Succeeded by Dina Ellermann & Tõnu Endrekson
