= Biathlon at the 2010 Winter Olympics – Men's individual =

Men's individual at the XXI Olympic Winter Games
- Pictogram for biathlon
- Venue: Whistler Olympic Park
- Date: February 18, 2010
- Competitors: 88 from 32 nations

Medalists
1st place, gold medalist(s)		Emil Hegle Svendsen	Norway
2nd place, silver medalist(s)		Ole Einar Bjørndalen	Norway
2nd place, silver medalist(s)		Sergey Novikov	Belarus

The men's individual competition of the Vancouver 2010 Olympics was held at Whistler Olympic Park in Whistler, British Columbia on February 18, 2010. Two silver medals were awarded for a second-place tie. No bronze medal was awarded.

== Results ==
Rank	Bib	Name	Country	Time	Penalties (P+S+P+S)	Deficit
1st place, gold medalist(s)	5	Emil Hegle Svendsen	Norway	48:22.5	1 (0+0+0+1)	
2nd place, silver medalist(s)	12	Ole Einar Bjørndalen	Norway	48:32.0	2 (0+1+0+1)	+9.5
2nd place, silver medalist(s)	27	Sergey Novikov	Belarus	48:32.0	0 (0+0+0+0)	+9.5
4	11	Pavol Hurajt	Slovakia	49:39.0	1 (0+0+1+0)	+1:16.5
5	16	Simon Eder	Austria	49:41.7	2 (1+1+0+0)	+1:19.2
6	1	Tomasz Sikora	Poland	49:43.8	2 (1+1+0+0)	+1:21.3
7	4	Christoph Sumann	Austria	50:04.9	3 (0+2+0+1)	+1:42.4
8	49	Daniel Mesotitsch	Austria	50:32.0	2 (0+1+0+1)	+2:09.5
9	17	Michael Greis	Germany	50:37.6	2 (0+2+0+0)	+2:15.1
10	72	Nikolay Kruglov	Russia	50:40.4	0 (0+0+0+0)	+2:17.9
11	77	Andreas Birnbacher	Germany	50:43.5	2 (2+0+0+0)	+2:21.0
12	3	Jean-Philippe Leguellec	Canada	50:47.1	2 (0+1+1+0)	+2:24.6
13	85	Martin Fourcade	France	50:55.4	3 (1+0+2+0)	+2:32.9
14	28	Ivan Tcherezov	Russia	50:56.7	3 (1+0+2+0)	+2:34.2
15	26	Thomas Frei	Switzerland	51:03.4	2 (1+0+0+1)	+2:40.9
16	35	Michal Šlesingr	Czech Republic	51:04.8	2 (0+0+1+1)	+2:42.3
17	41	Dušan Šimočko	Slovakia	51:20.6	2 (0+0+2+0)	+2:58.1
18	34	Zhang Chengye	China	51:31.0	3 (1+0+1+1)	+3:08.5
19	86	Priit Viks	Estonia	51:38.1	1 (1+0+0+0)	+3:15.6
20	65	Tarjei Bø	Norway	51:51.5	3 (1+0+1+1)	+3:29.0
21	48	Olexander Bilanenko	Ukraine	52:00.3	1 (0+1+0+0)	+3:37.8
22	36	Dominik Landertinger	Austria	52:00.8	4 (0+2+1+1)	+3:38.3
23	61	Alexander Wolf	Germany	52:09.0	2 (1+0+0+1)	+3:46.5
24	2	Krasimir Anev	Bulgaria	52:09.2	2 (0+2+0+0)	+3:46.7
25	40	Vincent Defrasne	France	52:14.9	3 (0+1+2+0)	+3:52.4
26	67	Andriy Deryzemlya	Ukraine	52:19.1	3 (0+2+0+1)	+3:56.6
27	56	Alexander Os	Norway	52:19.8	3 (0+0+2+1)	+3:57.3
28	39	Christoph Stephan	Germany	52:33.4	3 (1+0+0+2)	+4:10.9
29	47	Jaroslav Soukup	Czech Republic	52:35.2	3 (0+2+1+0)	+4:12.7
30	23	Markus Windisch	Italy	52:38.7	3 (0+3+0+0)	+4:16.2
31	10	Klemen Bauer	Slovenia	52:43.9	3 (0+2+0+1)	+4:21.4
32	66	Marek Matiasko	Slovakia	52:47.9	2 (0+1+0+1)	+4:25.4
33	73	Mattias Nilsson	Sweden	52:50.1	3 (1+1+0+1)	+4:27.6
34	84	Roman Dostál	Czech Republic	52:51.4	3 (0+2+0+1)	+4:28.9
35	51	Anton Shipulin	Russia	52:51.7	3 (3+0+0+0)	+4:29.2
36	37	Edgars Piksons	Latvia	52:52.5	2 (1+1+0+0)	+4:30.0
37	80	Christian de Lorenzi	Italy	53:03.6	4 (1+0+2+1)	+4:41.1
38	70	Matthias Simmen	Switzerland	53:05.7	4 (1+1+2+0)	+4:43.2
39	75	Simon Fourcade	France	53:06.2	4 (3+0+0+1)	+4:43.7
40	45	Alexandr Syman	Belarus	53:16.2	3 (2+0+1+0)	+4:53.7
41	32	Björn Ferry	Sweden	53:16.7	5 (1+0+3+1)	+4:54.2
42	46	Simon Hallenbarter	Switzerland	53:18.4	5 (1+0+1+3)	+4:55.9
43	43	Kauri Koiv	Estonia	53:22.4	3 (1+0+1+1)	+4:59.9
44	21	Tim Burke	United States	53:22.6	5 (1+1+0+3)	+5:00.1
45	68	Lukas Hofer	Italy	53:23.7	3 (0+1+1+1)	+5:01.2
46	87	Miroslav Matiaško	Slovakia	53:29.2	3 (1+1+0+1)	+5:06.7
47	59	Rustam Valiullin	Belarus	53:32.3	4 (1+1+0+2)	+5:09.8
48	88	Vasja Rupnik	Slovenia	53:49.8	4 (1+1+1+1)	+5:27.3
49	54	Alexsandr Chervyhkov	Kazakhstan	53:53.1	4 (0+0+0+4)	+5:30.6
50	29	Jakov Fak	Croatia	53:56.0	4 (1+1+0+2)	+5:33.5
51	81	Serhiy Semenov	Ukraine	53:57.5	3 (1+0+1+1)	+5:35.0
52	24	Paavo Puurunen	Finland	54:03.5	4 (1+1+0+2)	+5:41.0
53	53	Rene Laurent Vuillermoz	Italy	54:19.7	4 (0+1+1+2)	+5:57.2
54	74	Benjamin Weger	Switzerland	54:20.3	5 (1+1+2+1)	+5:57.8
55	38	Timo Antila	Finland	54:22.7	5 (1+1+1+2)	+6:00.2
56	42	Lowell Bailey	United States	54:23.1	4 (0+2+1+1)	+6:00.6
57	76	Evgeny Abramenko	Belarus	54:24.8	2 (0+1+0+1)	+6:02.3
58	55	Łukasz Szczurek	Poland	54:36.7	3 (1+0+1+1)	+6:14.2
59	69	Vincent Jay	France	54:37.5	4 (1+1+0+2)	+6:15.0
60	52	Carl Johan Bergman	Sweden	54:44.1	5 (2+1+0+2)	+6:21.6
61	50	Janez Maric	Slovenia	54:46.4	5 (1+2+1+1)	+6:23.9
62	44	Michail Kletcherov	Bulgaria	54:54.6	3 (1+1+1+0)	+6:32.1
63	7	Yan Savitskiy	Kazakhstan	55:07.3	5 (0+1+2+2)	+6:44.8
64	64	Roland Lessing	Estonia	55:29.8	5 (3+0+1+1)	+7:07.3
65	31	Lee-Steve Jackson	Great Britain	55:37.5	4 (1+2+1+0)	+7:15.0
66	71	Zdeněk Vítek	Czech Republic	55:41.2	6 (2+1+1+2)	+7:18.7
67	19	Serhiy Sednev	Ukraine	55:47.1	4 (0+3+0+1)	+7:24.6
68	57	Alexandr Trifonov	Kazakhstan	55:53.1	4 (2+1+1+0)	+7:30.6
69	62	Kristaps Libietis	Latvia	56:02.4	3 (2+0+1+0)	+7:39.9
70	30	Lee In-Bok	South Korea	56:24.5	4 (2+0+0+2)	+8:02.0
71	79	Dias Keneshev	Kazakhstan	56:27.0	4 (1+0+0+3)	+8:04.5
72	14	Kaspars Dumbris	Latvia	56:30.1	5 (2+0+2+1)	+8:07.6
73	78	Ilmārs Bricis	Latvia	56:33.9	6 (3+1+1+1)	+8:11.4
74	63	Peter Dokl	Slovenia	56:41.9	2 (2+0+0+0)	+8:19.4
75	58	Jay Hakkinen	United States	57:01.8	7 (2+1+2+2)	+8:39.3
76	82	Fredrik Lindström	Sweden	57:29.8	4 (1+2+0+1)	+9:07.3
77	15	Alexei Almoukov	Australia	57:37.6	4 (1+1+2+0)	+9:15.1
78	60	Vladimir Iliev	Bulgaria	57:37.8	5 (2+1+1+1)	+9:15.3
79	9	Athanassios Tsakiris	Greece	57:42.1	5 (2+0+1+2)	+9:19.6
80	25	Martten Kaldvee	Estonia	57:56.7	6 (1+1+2+2)	+9:34.2
81	13	Imre Tagscherer	Hungary	58:02.6	4 (1+3+0+0)	+9:40.1
82	20	Hidenori Isa	Japan	58:06.2	9 (3+0+3+3)	+9:43.7
83	83	Martin Bogdanov	Bulgaria	58:29.6	4 (1+2+0+1)	+10:07.1
84	8	Victor Pinzaru	Moldova	58:42.6	3 (0+1+0+2)	+10:20.1
85	18	Wynn Roberts	United States	58:49.2	8 (3+2+0+3)	+10:26.7
86	33	Milanko Petrović	Serbia	59:44.0	7 (2+1+2+2)	+11:21.5
87	22	Øystein Slettemark	Denmark	61:12.9	8 (2+1+2+3)	+12:50.4
-	~~8~~	~~Evgeny Ustyugov~~	~~Russia~~	~~49:11.8~~	DSQ	

== See also ==
- Biathlon at the 2010 Winter Paralympics – Men's individual
