= Jüri Lossmann =

Estonian long-distance runner (1891–1984)

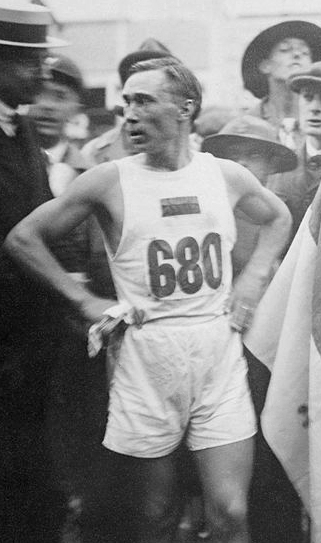
- Jüri Lossmann at the 1920 Olympics

Personal information
- Born: 4 February 1891 Kabala, Governorate of Livonia
- Died: 1 May 1984 (aged 93) Stockholm, Sweden
- Height: 1.69 m (5 ft 7 in)
- Weight: 69 kg (152 lb)

Sport
- Sport: Athletics
- Events: 10,000 m, marathon
- Club: Kalev Tallinn

Achievements and titles
- Personal bests: 10,000 m – 34:05.0 (1924); Marathon – 2:32:49 (1920)
Medal record
Men's athletics
Representing Estonia
Olympic Games
Silver medal – second place	1920 Antwerp	Marathon

Jüri Lossmann (4 February [O.S. 23 January] 1891 – 1 May 1984) was an Estonian long-distance runner. He finished second in the marathon at the 1920 Summer Olympics in Antwerp, at 2:32:48.6, trailing Hannes Kolehmainen by 13 seconds, but beating the third-placed Valerio Arri by almost 4 minutes. At the 1924 Summer Olympics in Paris, he was the flag bearer for Estonia and finished tenth in the marathon.

== Biography ==
Lossmann started as a football player for Merkur club before changing to athletics. He was wounded in World War I, but recovered and, in 1916, won a marathon race in Tallinn and the Russian Championships in the 5000 m. In 1923, he won the international marathon in Gothenburg, Sweden, and in 1928, he ran the first leg of the Trans America Run. Next year he set an Estonian record in one-hour running and competed in the Antwerp marathon.

Besides running, Lossmann worked for the Estonian Chocolate Factory Kawe in 1922–36, and in the 1930s trained Estonian long-distance runners, but without much success. In 1942–44 he served as a sports administrator in Estonia.

During World War II he fled to Sweden just before the arrival of the Soviet troops. Lossmann was earlier trained as a jeweler, and in Sweden he worked as a gold- and silversmith. In 1964, he made a silver cup for Gustaf VI Adolf of Sweden to express the gratitude of the Estonian community in Sweden.
