= Helen Novikov =

Estonian architect and Olympic luger

Personal information
- National team: Estonia
- Born: 26 November 1976 (age 49) Tallinn, then part of Estonian SSR, Soviet Union
- Education: B.AS in Applied Science; B.A. in Architecture; Tallinn University of Applied Sciences; Estonian Academy of Arts
- Occupation: Architect
- Height: 165 cm (5 ft 5 in)
- Weight: 61 kg (134 lb)

Sport
- Country: Estonia
- Sport: Luge

Achievements and titles
- Olympic finals: 1994 Winter Olympics; 1998 Winter Olympics

Helen Novikov (born 26 November 1976) is an Estonian architect and former Olympic luger. She represented Estonia at the 1994 and 1998 Winter Olympics.

== Biography ==
Novikov was born in Tallinn and grew up in Tõrva. She attended the Estonian Academy of Arts in architecture. Following the 1988 Olympics, she got her Bachelor of Applied Science degree at the Tallinn University of Applied Sciences.

Novikov began luging in 1987. She trained in Sigulda, Latvia with coaches Viljo Grauding and Peter Kirdi.

She is currently an architect for Ritsu AS, a company that designs and produces wooden houses.

== Winter Olympics ==
Novikov made her Olympic debut in the 1994 Winter Olympics in Lillehammer, Norway. She was the sole Estonian luger at the games. She participated in the women's singles event finishing 19th overall.

Novikov returned in 1998 to the following Winter Olympics in Nagano, Japan. She came in 20th in the women's singles.
