= Estonia at the 1928 Winter Olympics =

- IOC code: EST
- NOC: Estonian Olympic Committee
- Website: www.eok.ee (in Estonian)

in St. Moritz
- Competitors: 2 (men) in 1 sport
- Flag bearer: Eduard Hiiop
- Medals: Gold 0 Silver 0 Bronze 0 Total 0

Winter Olympics appearances (overview)
- 1928; 1932; 1936; 1948–1988; 1992; 1994; 1998; 2002; 2006; 2010; 2014; 2018; 2022; 2026

Other related appearances
- Soviet Union (1956–1988)

Estonia competed at the Winter Olympic Games for the first time at the 1928 Winter Olympics in St. Moritz, Switzerland.

Estonia sent 2 athletes and 2 representatives to those games. Representatives were Eduard Hiiop and Johannes Villemson, however none attained a top-three spot.

== Speed skating ==
Men

Athlete	Event	Final	
Athlete	Event	Time	Rank
Christfried Burmeister	500 m	46.2	15
Christfried Burmeister	1500 m	2:33.6	19
Christfried Burmeister	5000 m	9:46.2	24
Aleksander Mitt	500 m	47.7	22
Aleksander Mitt	1500 m	2:35.0	20
Aleksander Mitt	5000 m	9:35.2	21
