= Tõnu Tõniste =

Estonian sailor

Tõnu Tõniste OLY
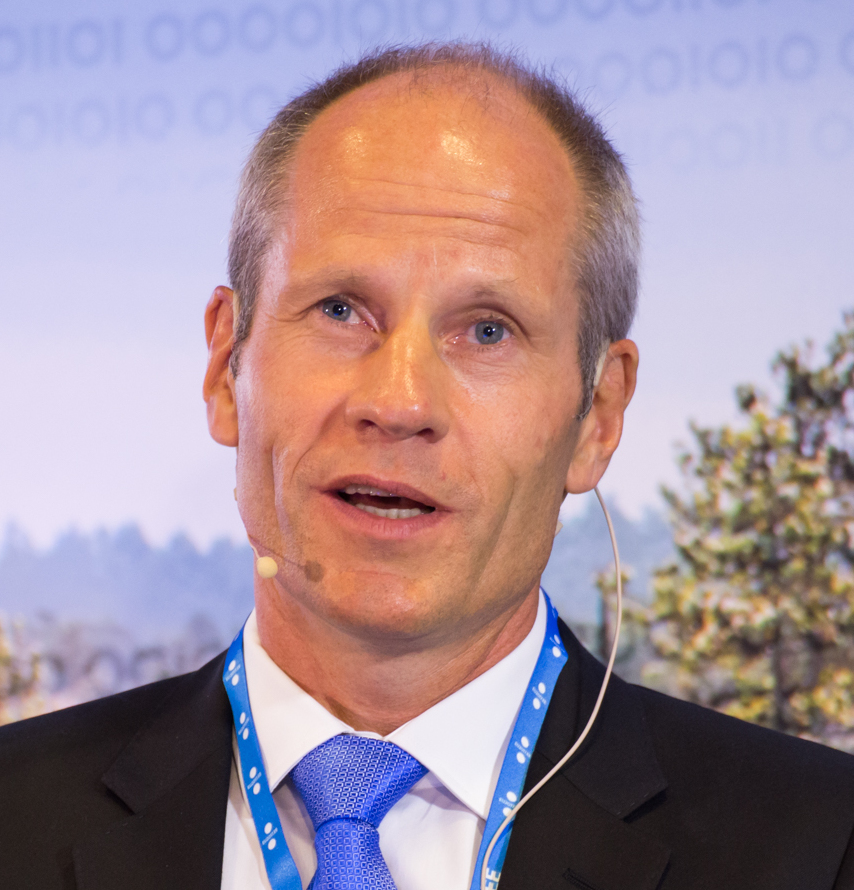
- Tõniste in 2017

Personal information
- Born: 26 April 1967 (age 59) Tallinn, then part of Estonian SSR, Soviet Union
- Height: 182 cm (6 ft 0 in)
- Weight: 76 kg (168 lb)

Sailing career
- Sport: Sailing
- Classes: 470, Melges 24, 49er
Medal record
Men's sailing
Olympic Games
Representing the Soviet Union
Silver medal – second place	1988 Seoul	470 class
Representing Estonia
Bronze medal – third place	1992 Barcelona	470 class

Tõnu Tõniste (born 26 April 1967) is an Estonian Olympic sailor. He competed in four consecutive Summer Olympics, starting in 1988, winning a silver and a bronze medal in the men's 470 class, for the Soviet Union (silver, 1988) and for Estonia (bronze, 1992). He did so with his twin brother Toomas Tõniste. Now he is sailing in team Lenny in the Melges 24 class.

Summer Olympics
Preceded by Jüri Jaanson	Flagbearer for Estonia; Sydney 2000	Succeeded by Erki Nool
