= Dina Ellermann =

Estonian dressage rider

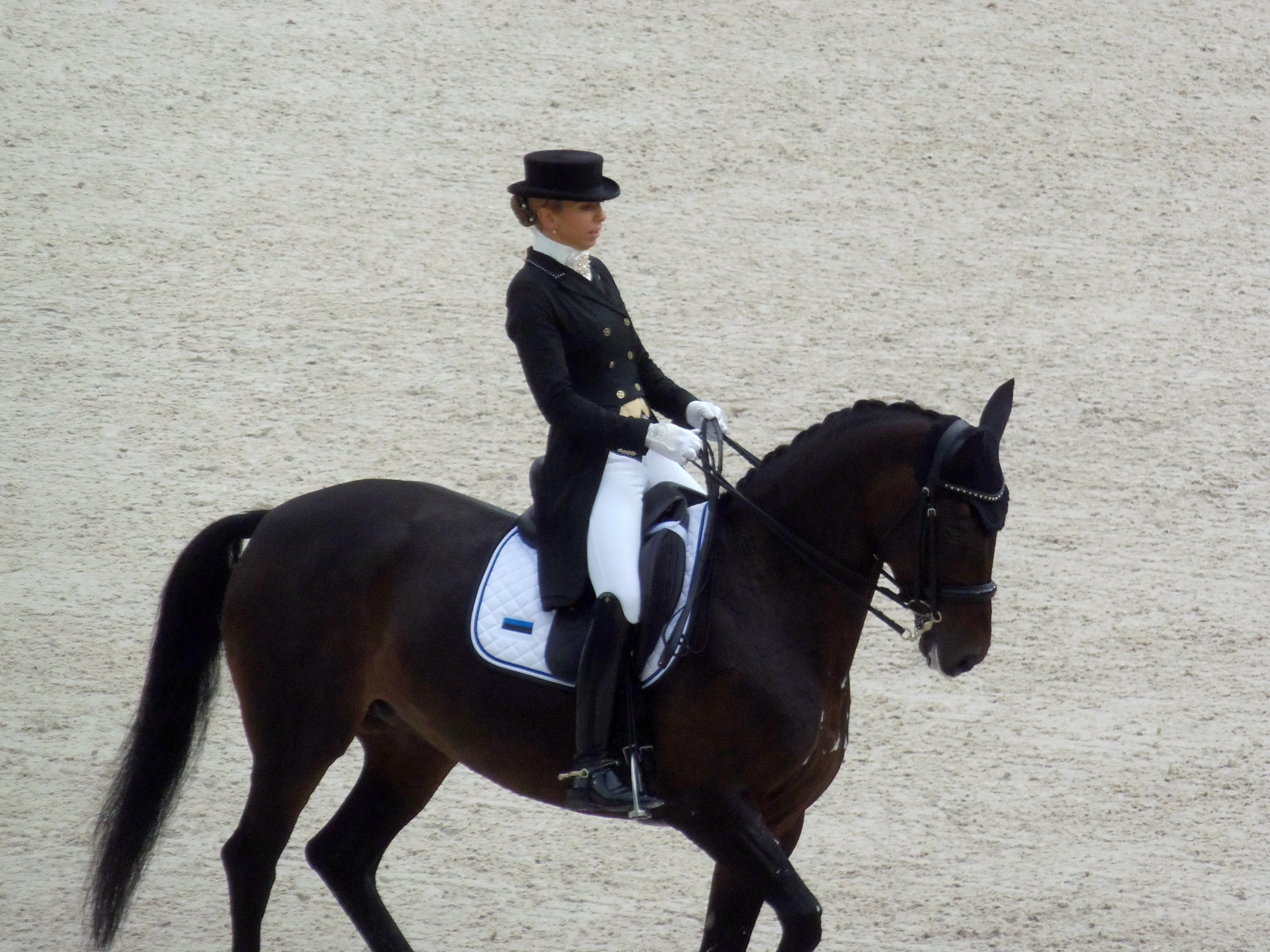
- Dina Ellermann and Landy's Akvarel (2014 World Equestrian Games)

Personal information
- Nationality: Estonian
- Born: Dina Radha'a; December 20, 1980 (age 45) Baghdad, Iraq

Sport
- Country: Estonia
- Sport: Dressage
- Club: Tondi Riding Club, Tallinn

Achievements and titles
- Olympic finals: 2020 Olympic Games
- World finals: 2014 FEI World Equestrian Games

Dina Ellermann (née Dina Radha'a; born 20 December 1980) is an Estonian dressage rider. She competed at the 2014 World Equestrian Games, and at three European Dressage Championships (in 2015, 2017 and 2019). She competed at the Tokyo 2020 Olympic Games, becoming the first Estonian equestrian to do so, and finished 49th individually.

Ellermann was born in Baghdad, Iraq to an Estonian mother and an Iraqi father. She graduated from secondary education from Tallinn 21st School in 2000 and in 2005 from Tallinn University, majoring in recreation management. She began training in equestrian sports at the age of 11.

Ellermann has been the Estonian national champion nine times (2012–20) and the Estonian interior champion six times (2008, 2016–20). She has been a member of the Estonian national team since 2008. Her current best international championship result is 49th place from the 2017 European Championships.

Olympic Games
Preceded by Karl-Martin Rammo	Flagbearer for Estonia (with Tõnu Endrekson); Tokyo 2020	Succeeded by Incumbent
