= Wynn Roberts (biathlete) =

American biathlete (born 1988)

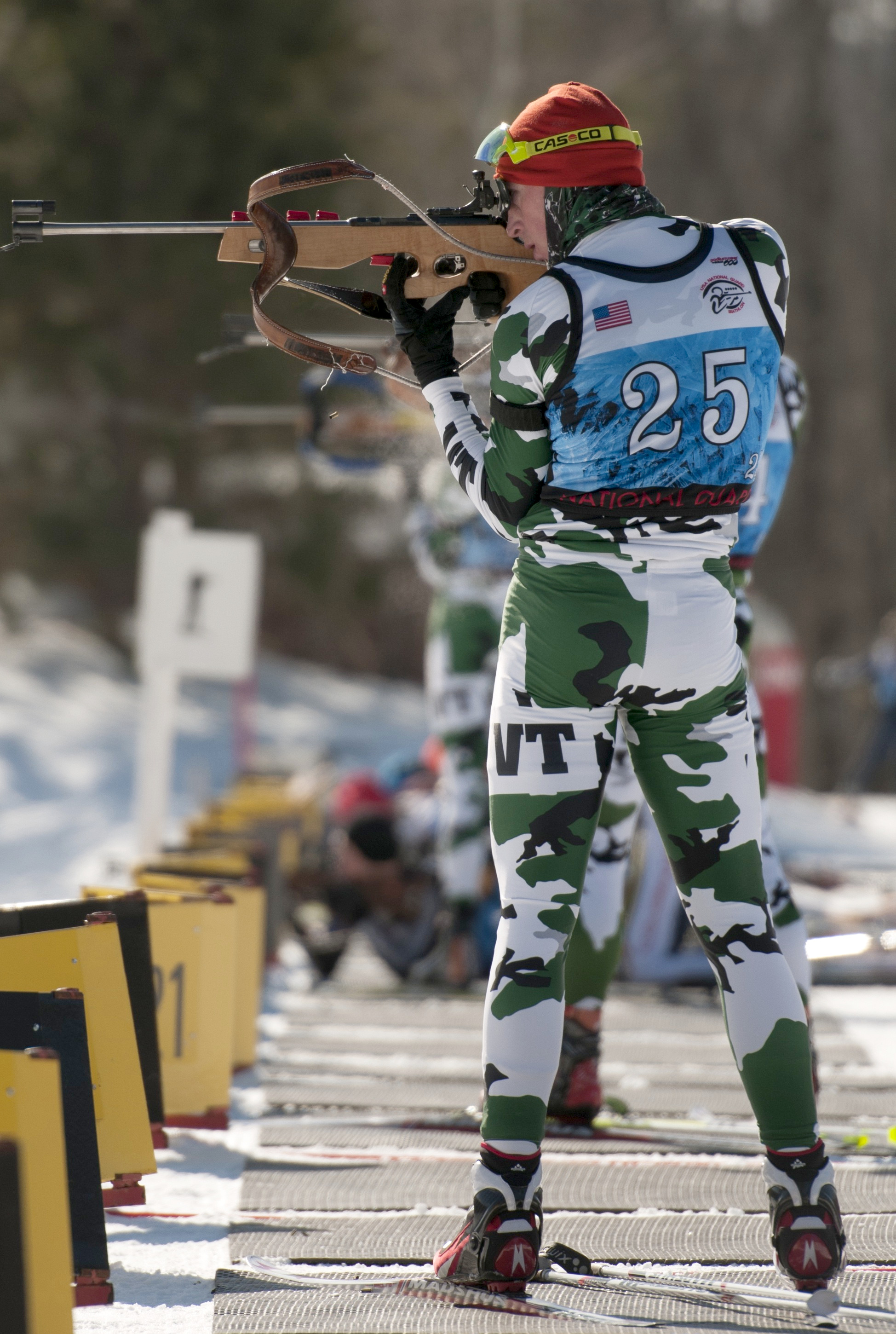
- Wynn Roberts in 2014

Personal information
- Born: March 1, 1988 (age 38) Fergus Falls, Minnesota, United States
- Height: 1.85 m (6 ft 1 in)
- Weight: 82 kg (181 lb)

Sport
- Sport: Biathlon
- Club: Mt Itasca Winter Sports Center; Minnesota State University

Wynn Andrew Roberts (born March 1, 1988) is an American biathlete. He competed in the 20 km individual race at the 2010 Olympics and finished 86th out of 88 with a final time of 58:49.2. He was a late replacement for Jeremy Teela, who withdrew due to illness on the morning of the event.
