= Eveli Saue =

Estonian orienteering competitor and biathlete

Personal information
- Born: February 13, 1984 (age 42) Kärdla, Estonia
Medal record
Women's orienteering
Junior World Championships
Bronze medal – third place	2003 Põlva	Short
Women's biathlon
Junior World Championships
Bronze medal – third place	2005 Kontiolahti	Relay
Women's biathlon orienteering
World Championships
Gold medal – first place	2006 Haanja	Sprint

Eveli Saue (born February 13, 1984) is an Estonian orienteering competitor and retired biathlete. She is world champion in the combined sport biathlon orienteering.

== Orienteering ==
She received a bronze medal in the short course at the 2003 Junior World Orienteering Championships in Põlva.

== Biathlon ==
She participated in biathlon at the 2006 Winter Olympics in Turin, where she finished 47th in the sprint and 73rd in the individual. At the 2010 Winter Olympics in Vancouver she finished 18th in the 4×6 km relay, 42nd in the 15 km individual and 55th in the 7.5 km sprint

== Biathlon orienteering ==
She received a gold medal in sprint at the World Championship in biathlon orienteering in Haanja in 2006.

== See also ==
- Estonian orienteers
- List of orienteers
- List of orienteering events

Winter Olympics
Preceded by Allar Levandi	Flagbearer for Estonia; Turin 2006	Succeeded by Roland Lessing
