= Lohusalu =

Village in Estonia

- Village
- Location within Estonia
- Coordinates: 59.394166666667°N 24.1975°E
- Country: Estonia
- County: Harju County
- Parish: Lääne-Harju Parish
- Time zone: UTC+2 (EET)
  - Summer (DST): UTC+3 (EEST)

Lohusalu is a village in Lääne-Harju Parish, Harju County, Estonia. The village spans the Lohusalu peninsula. In 2000, it had a population of 221.

The landscape of Lohusalu is quite diverse, although it is mostly covered by a pine forest with blueberries for understory. Sea Sandwort and Japanese rose grow in abundance at the beaches. Grassleaf orache, European searocket and Triangle orache are well-known plant varieties in Lohusalu.

Near the Lohusalu peninsula, at Lohusalu bay, lies part of the wreck (stern and fore under 11 meters) of the passenger ship Iosif Stalin.

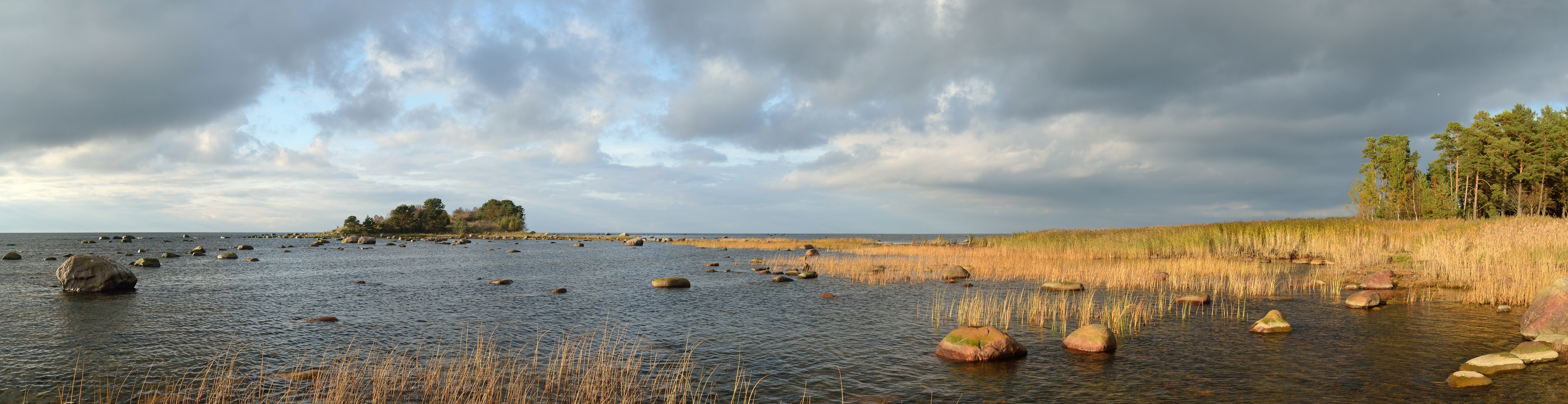
Cape Nabe
