= Allar Levandi =

Estonian Nordic combined skier (born 1965)

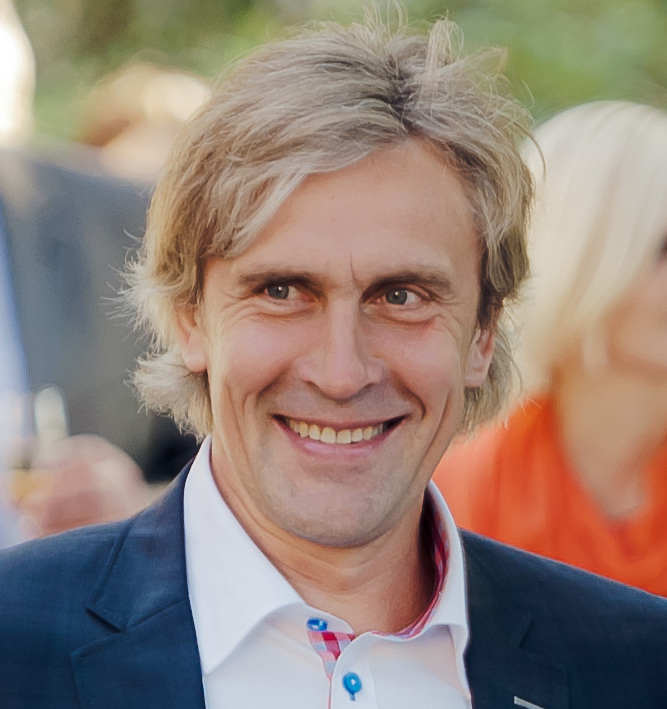
- Allar Levandi in 2012

Personal information
- Born: 28 December 1965 (age 60) Tallinn, Estonia
Medal record
Men's Nordic combined
Representing Soviet Union
Olympic Games
Bronze medal – third place	1988 Calgary	individual
World Championships
Bronze medal – third place	1987 Oberstdorf	3 x 10 km team

Allar Levandi (born 28 December 1965)is an Estonian Nordic combined skier who competed during the late 1980s and early 1990s under two different nations in three straight Winter Olympic Games (1988: Soviet Union, 1992 and 1994: Estonia). He trained at Dynamo in Tallinn when Estonia was under Soviet rule in the late 1980s.

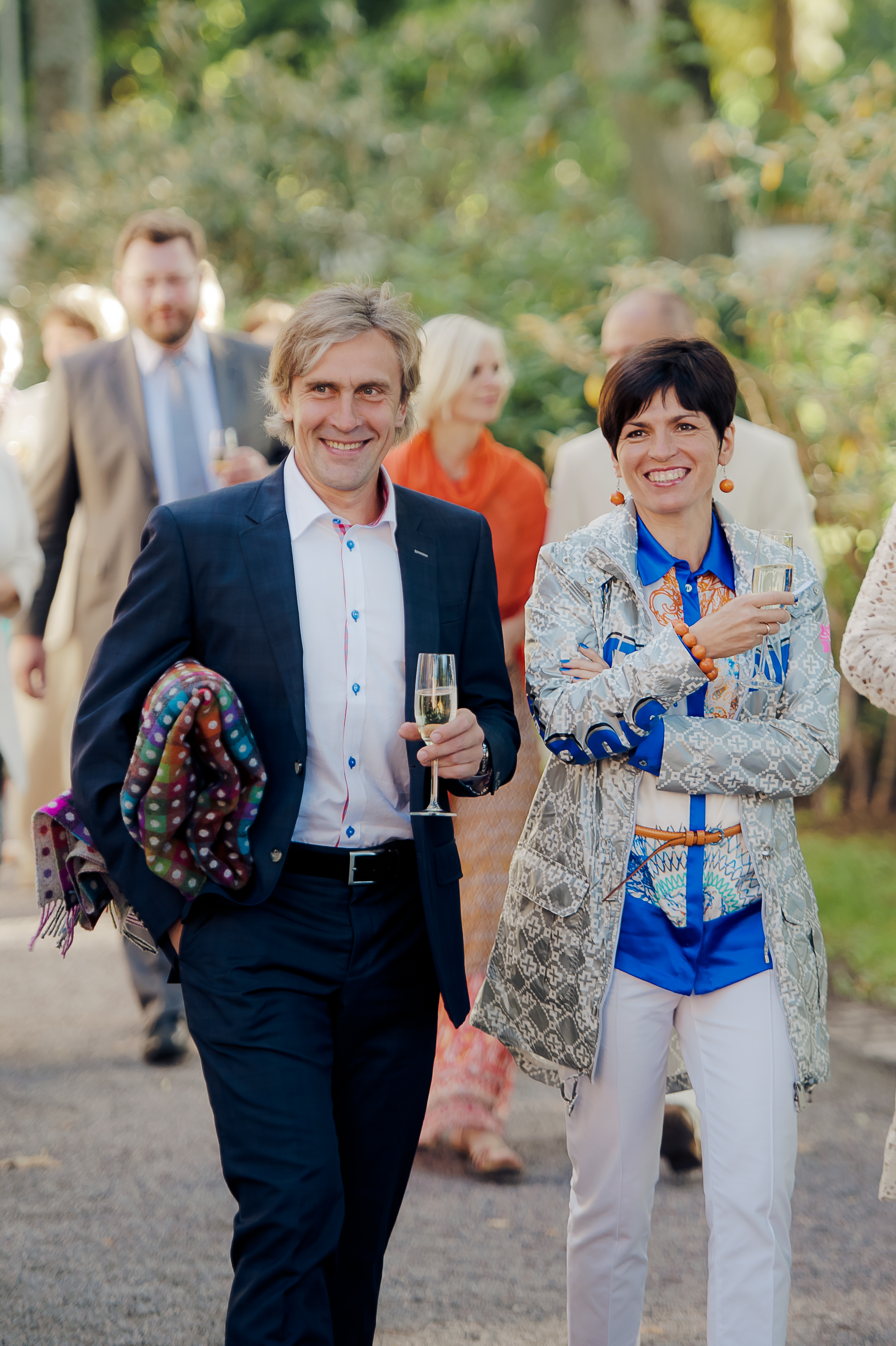
Allar Levandi with his wife Anna in 2012

Levandi won a bronze medal in the individual Nordic combined event at the 1988 Winter Olympics in Calgary. Levandi also won a bronze medal in the 3 x 10 km team event at the 1987 FIS Nordic World Ski Championships in Oberstdorf.

== Personal life ==
He is married to Anna Kondrashova, a retired competitive figure skater and a current figure skating coach and choreographer.

Awards
Preceded by Jaan Ehlvest	Estonian Sportsman of the Year; 1988	Succeeded by Jaan Ehlvest
Winter Olympics
Preceded by Kalju Ojaste	Flagbearer for Estonia; Salt Lake City 2002	Succeeded by Eveli Saue
Preceded by Ants Antson	Flagbearer for Estonia; Lillehammer 1994	Succeeded by Kalju Ojaste
