= Elmo Kassin =

Estonian cross-country skier (born 1969)

Personal information
- Nationality: Estonian
- Born: 13 October 1969 (age 56) Valga, Estonia

Sport
- Sport: Cross-country skiing

Elmo Kassin (born 13 October 1969) is an Estonian cross-country skier. He competed at the 1992 Winter Olympics, the 1994 Winter Olympics and the 1998 Winter Olympics.
