= Martin Himma =

Estonian cross-country skier (born 1999)

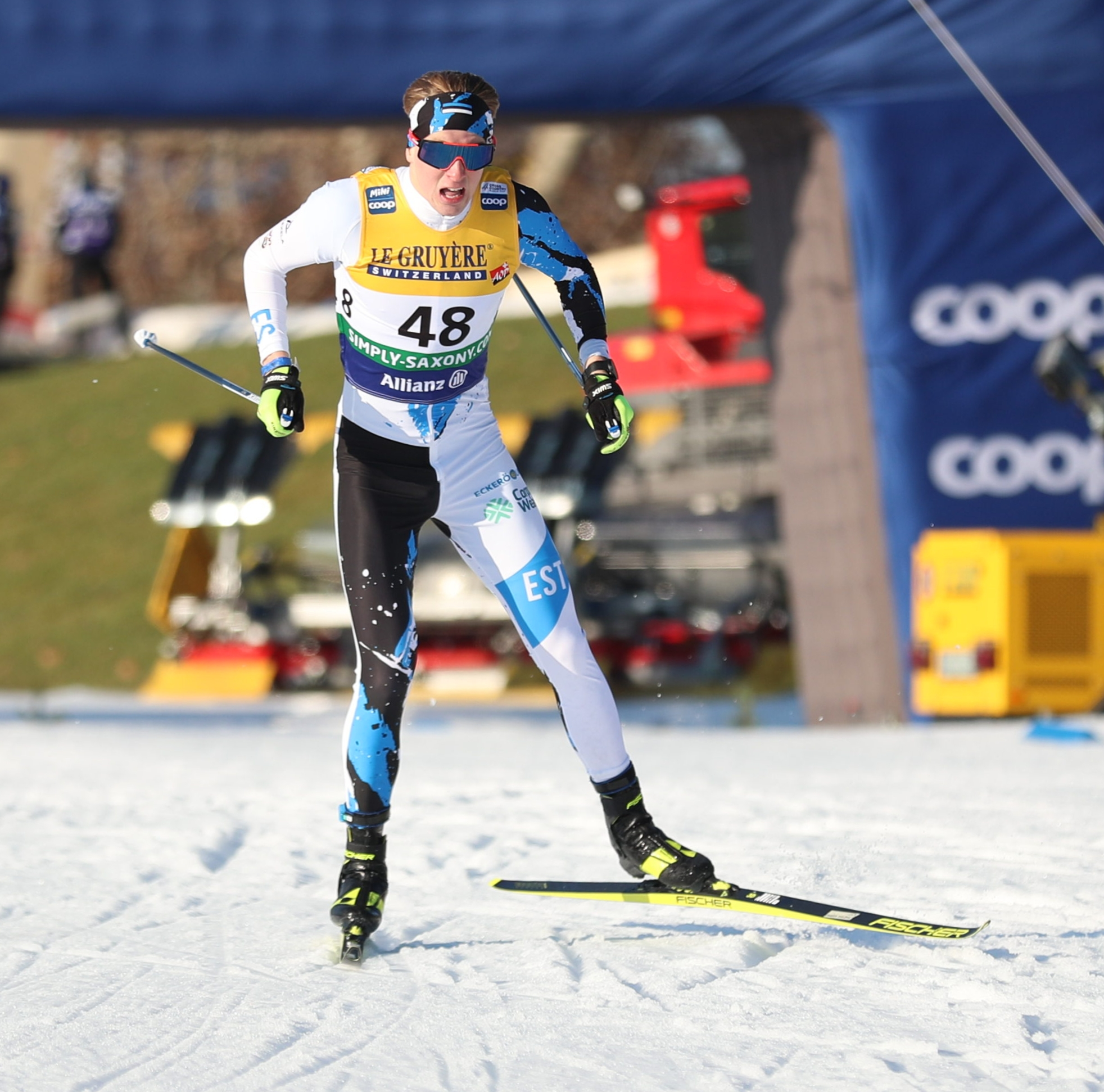
- Himma in 2020

Personal information
- Nationality: Estonia
- Born: 30 August 1999 (age 26) Tamsalu, Estonia

Sport
- Sport: Skiing
- Club: Karupesa Team

World Cup career
- Seasons: 4 – (2020–present)
- Indiv. starts: 33
- Indiv. podiums: 0
- Team starts: 7
- Team podiums: 0
- Overall titles: 0 – (89th in 2023)
- Discipline titles: 0
- Updated on 29 March 2023

Martin Himma (born 30 August 1999) is an Estonian cross-country skier. He competed in the 15 kilometre classical and the sprint at the 2022 Winter Olympics. He was also the flagbearer for Estonia at the Parade of Nations.

== Cross-country skiing results ==
All results are sourced from the International Ski Federation (FIS).

=== Olympic Games ===
Year	Age	15 km individual	30 km skiathlon	50 km mass start	Sprint	4 × 10 km relay	Team sprint
2022	22	56	—	—^{[a]}	48	15	11

^{a} Distance reduced to 30 km due to weather conditions.

=== World Championships ===
Year	Age	15 km individual	30 km skiathlon	50 km mass start	Sprint	4 × 10 km relay	Team sprint
2019	19	79	—	—	—	—	—
2021	21	66	—	—	42	13	15
2023	23	47	—	—	41	12	12

=== World Cup ===
==== Season standings ====
Season	Age	Discipline standings				Ski Tour standings		
Season	Age	Overall	Distance	Sprint	U23	Nordic Opening	Tour de Ski	Ski Tour 2020
2020	20	NC	NC	NC	NC	68	—	—
2021	21	104	83	78	14	—	—	—N/a
2022	22	NC	NC	NC	NC	—N/a	—	—N/a
2023	23	89	63	79	—N/a	—N/a	46	—N/a
