= Pontus Karlsson =

Swedish footballer

Personal information
- Date of birth: 19 August 1983 (age 43)
- Height: 1.79 m (5 ft 10 in)
- Position: Midfielder

Youth career
- Åtvidabergs FF

Senior career*
Years	Team	Apps	(Gls)
2002–2011	Åtvidabergs FF	205	(42)
2011	→ BK Kenty (loan)		
- * Club domestic league appearances and goals

Pontus Karlsson (born 19 August 1983) is a Swedish retired football midfielder.

Spending his entire youth and senior career in Åtvidabergs FF, including a spell in Allsvenskan, in 2011 he was loaned out to BK Kenty.
