= Jelena Poljakova-Všivtseva =

Estonian biathlete (born 1972)

Personal information
- Nationality: Estonian
- Born: 13 December 1972 (age 53)

Sport
- Sport: Biathlon

Jelena Poljakova-Všivtseva (born 13 December 1972) is a former Estonian biathlete. She competed at the 1992 Winter Olympics and the 1994 Winter Olympics.
