= Ants Antson =

Soviet speed skater (1938–2015)

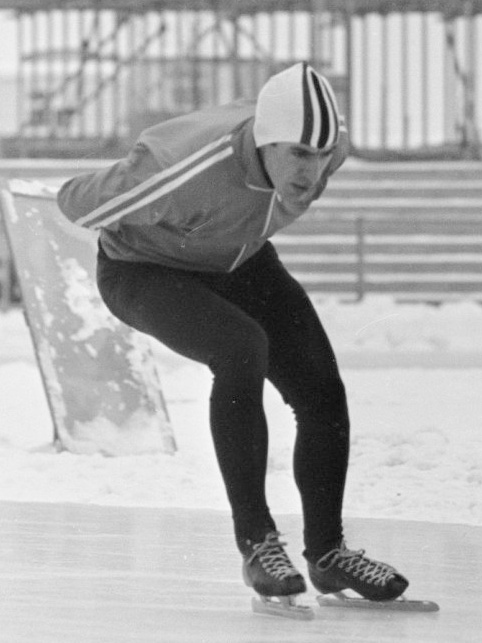
- Ants Antson in 1966

Personal information
- Born: 11 November 1938 Tallinn, Estonia
- Died: 31 October 2015 (aged 76)
- Height: 1.84 m (6 ft 0 in)
- Weight: 84 kg (185 lb)

Sport
- Sport: Speed skating
- Club: Kalev Tallinn
Medal record
Representing the Soviet Union
Olympic Games
Gold medal – first place	1964 Innsbruck	1500 m

Ants Antson (11 November 1938 – 31 October 2015) was an Estonian speed skater who competed for the Soviet Union.

== Biography ==
Antson trained at the Kalev Voluntary Sports Society. Coached by former World, Olympic, and European Champion Boris Shilkov, Antson had his best year in 1964, when he became European Allround Champion, won the 1500 m event at the 1964 Winter Olympics in Innsbruck, and set a new world record in the 3000 m. For his achievements that year, he received the Oscar Mathisen Award.

The two gold medals Antson won in 1964 turned out to be his only international medals, although he did win some national medals at the Soviet Allround Championships – gold in 1967, silver in 1965 and 1968, and bronze in 1966. He participated in the 1500 m at the 1968 Winter Olympics in Grenoble, but despite skating a new personal record, he finished only twelfth.

He retired shortly after the 1968 Games and worked as a sports official, first in the Soviet Estonian Committee for Physical Culture and Sports, and later with the Estonian Olympic Committee. At the 1992 Winter Olympics he became the first flag bearer for Estonia after it became independent from the Soviet Union.

In 1965, Antson married Estonian film actress Eve Kivi, the couple would divorce in 1972. He later married Ene Antson and the couple remained married until his death; one week and four days before his 77th birthday.

== Medals ==
An overview of medals won by Antson at important championships he participated in, listing the years in which he won each:

Championships	Gold medal	Silver medal	Bronze medal
Winter Olympics	1964 (1500 m)	–	–
World Allround	–	–	–
European Allround	1964	–	–
Soviet Allround	1967	1965; 1968	1966

== Records ==
=== World records ===
Over the course of his career, Antson skated one world record:

Discipline	Time	Date	Location
3000 m	4:27.3	11 February 1964	(Norway) Oslo

Source: SpeedSkatingStats.com

== Personal records ==
To put these personal records in perspective, the WR column lists the official world records on the dates that Antson skated his personal records.

Event	Result	Date	Venue	WR
500 m	40.7	16 January 1968	Medeo	39.5
1500 m	2:07.2	16 February 1968	Grenoble	2:02.5
3000 m	4:27.3	11 February 1964	Oslo	4:27.6
5000 m	7:34.8	16 January 1968	Medeo	7:26.2
10000 m	15:57.7	18 January 1964	Oslo	15:33.0
Big combination	177,198	17 January 1968	Medeo	176.982

Source: SpeedskatingResults.com

Antson has an Adelskalender score of 176.465 points. His highest ranking on the Adelskalender was fourth place.

== In popular culture ==
Ants Antson was portrayed in 2026 biographical film, Our Erika, co-written and directed by German Golub. In the film, Kumm was played by the Estonian actor Priit Loog.

Awards
Preceded by (Norway) Nils Aaness	Oscar Mathisen Award; 1964	Succeeded by (Norway) Per Ivar Moe
Preceded by (Estonia) Toomas Leius	Estonian Sportspersonality of the Year; 1964	Succeeded by (Estonia) Toomas Leius
