= Eveli Peterson =

Estonian biathlete (born 1967)

Personal information
- Nationality: Estonian
- Born: 19 October 1967 (age 57)

Sport
- Sport: Biathlon

Eveli Peterson (born 19 October 1967) is a retired Estonian biathlete. She competed at the 1992 Winter Olympics and the 1994 Winter Olympics.
