= Aivo Udras =

Estonian biathlete (born 1970)

Personal information
- Nationality: Estonian
- Born: 15 March 1970 (age 56) Võru, then part of Estonian SSR, Soviet Union

Sport
- Sport: Biathlon

Aivo Udras (born 15 March 1970) is an Estonian biathlete. He competed at the 1992 Winter Olympics and the 1994 Winter Olympics.
