= Kalju Ojaste =

Estonian biathlete (born 1961)

Personal information
- Nationality: Estonian
- Born: 8 December 1961 (age 63); Otepää, Estonia

Sport
- Sport: Biathlon

Kalju Ojaste (born 8 December 1961) is an Estonian biathlete. He competed at the 1992 Winter Olympics, the 1994 Winter Olympics and the 1998 Winter Olympics.

His daughter is cross-country skier Triin Ojaste.

Winter Olympics
Preceded by Allar Levandi	Flagbearer for Estonia; Nagano 1998	Succeeded by Allar Levandi
