= Urmas Kaldvee =

Estonian biathlete (born 1961)

Personal information
- Nationality: Estonian
- Born: 20 November 1961 (age 64) Võru, then part of Estonian SSR, Soviet Union

Sport
- Sport: Biathlon

Urmas Kaldvee (born 20 November 1961) is a former Estonian biathlete. He competed at the 1992 Winter Olympics and the 1994 Winter Olympics.
