= Krista Lepik =

Estonian biathlete (born 1964)

Personal information
- Nationality: Estonian
- Born: 26 April 1964 (age 62) Rakke, Lääne-Viru County, Estonia

Sport
- Sport: Biathlon

Krista Lepik (born 26 April 1964) is a retired Estonian biathlete. She competed at the 1992 Winter Olympics and the 1994 Winter Olympics.
