= Hillar Zahkna =

Estonian biathlete (born 1968)

Personal information
- Nationality: Estonian
- Born: 1 February 1968 (age 57); Vastseliina, Estonia

Sport
- Sport: Biathlon

Hillar Zahkna (born 1 February 1968) is a retired Estonian biathlete. He competed at the 1992 Winter Olympics and the 1994 Winter Olympics. His son is biathlete Rene Zahkna.
