= Peeter Nelis =

Estonian fencer and coach

Peeter Nelis (born 26 December 1953) is an Estonian fencer and coach.

He was born in Haapsalu. His father was prominent fencer Endel Nelis. In 1977 he graduated from Tartu University's Institute of Physical Education.

He started his fencing exercising in 1963, coached by his father. In 1972 he won team epee Estonian championships. 1972–1975 he was a member of Estonian national fencing team.

Since 1974 he is working as a fencing coach. Since 1993 he is a coach at fencing club En Garde. In 2018 he was the head coach of Estonia national épée team. Students: Kaido Kaaberma, Heidi Rohi, Hardo Lehis, Nikolai Novosjolov, Katrina Lehis, Kristina Kuusk.

Awards:

- 2001: (Estonian: Eesti Kultuurkapitali kehakultuuri ja spordi sihtkapitali aastapreemia)
