= Kristina Kuusk =

Estonian fencer (born 1985)

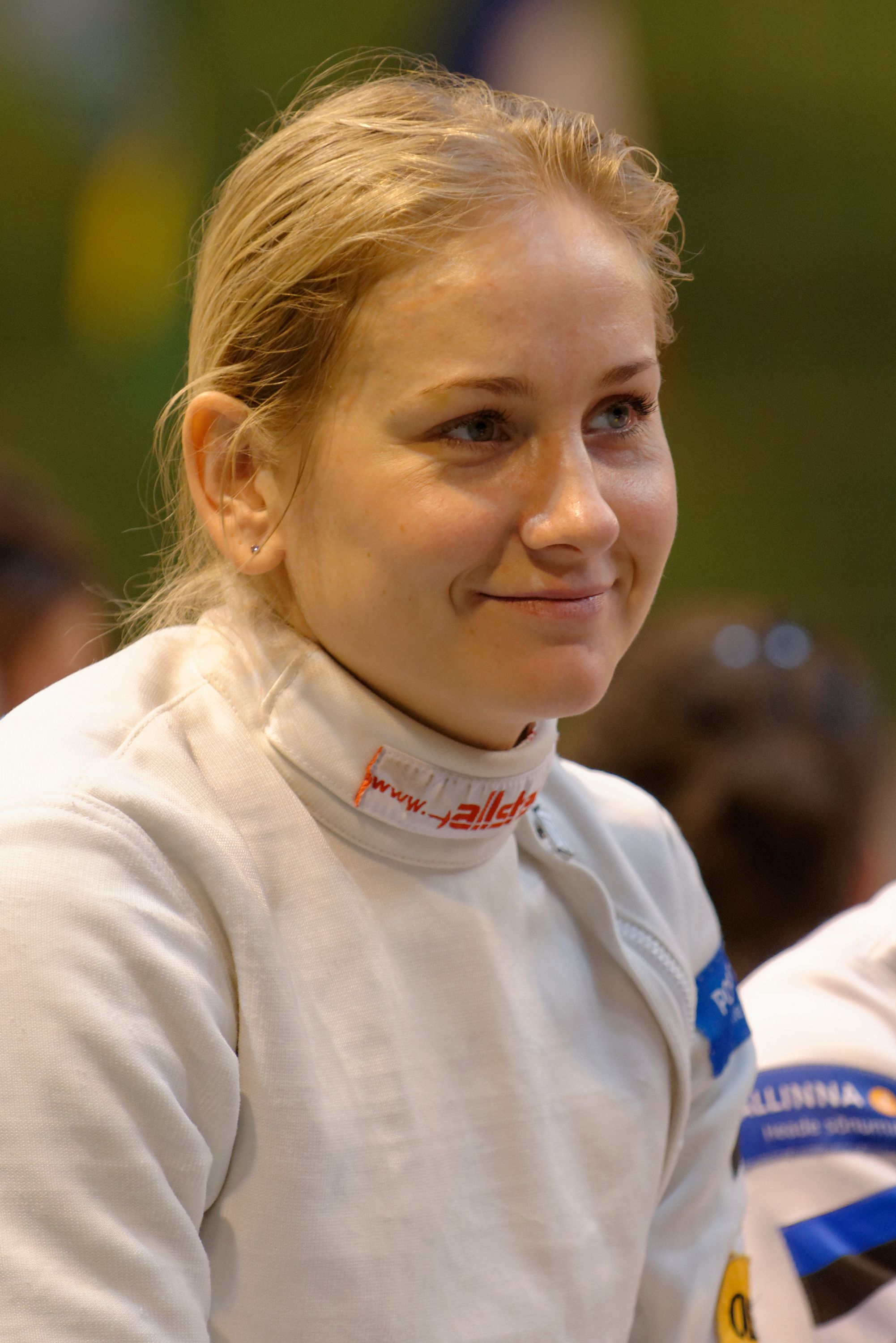
- Kuusk in 2013

Personal information
- Nationality: Estonian
- Born: 16 November 1985 (age 40) Haapsalu, then part of Estonian SSR, Soviet Union
- Height: 1.80 m (5 ft 11 in)
- Weight: 74 kg (163 lb)

Fencing career
- Sport: Fencing
- Weapon: épée
- Hand: right-handed
- FIE ranking: current ranking
Medal record
World Championships
Gold medal – first place	2017 Leipzig	Team épée
Silver medal – second place	2014 Kazan	Team épée
European Championships
Gold medal – first place	2013 Zagreb	Team épée
Gold medal – first place	2016 Toruń	Team épée
Silver medal – second place	2018 Novi Sad	Individual
Bronze medal – third place	2012 Legnano	Team épée
Bronze medal – third place	2018 Novi Sad	Team épée

Kristina Kuusk (born 16 November 1985) is an Estonian épée fencer and coach.

== Career ==
Kuusk began fencing in 1992, coached by Helen Nelis-Naukas, Boris Joffe and Kaido Kaaberma. From 2017, Kuusk began training under Peeter Nelis. She has won team épée gold medals at the 2013 and the 2016 European Fencing Championships and a team épée silver at the 2014 World Fencing Championships. In 2013, 2014 and 2017, Kuusk was named to the Estonian Sports Team of the Year.
