= Nelli Differt =

Estonian fencer

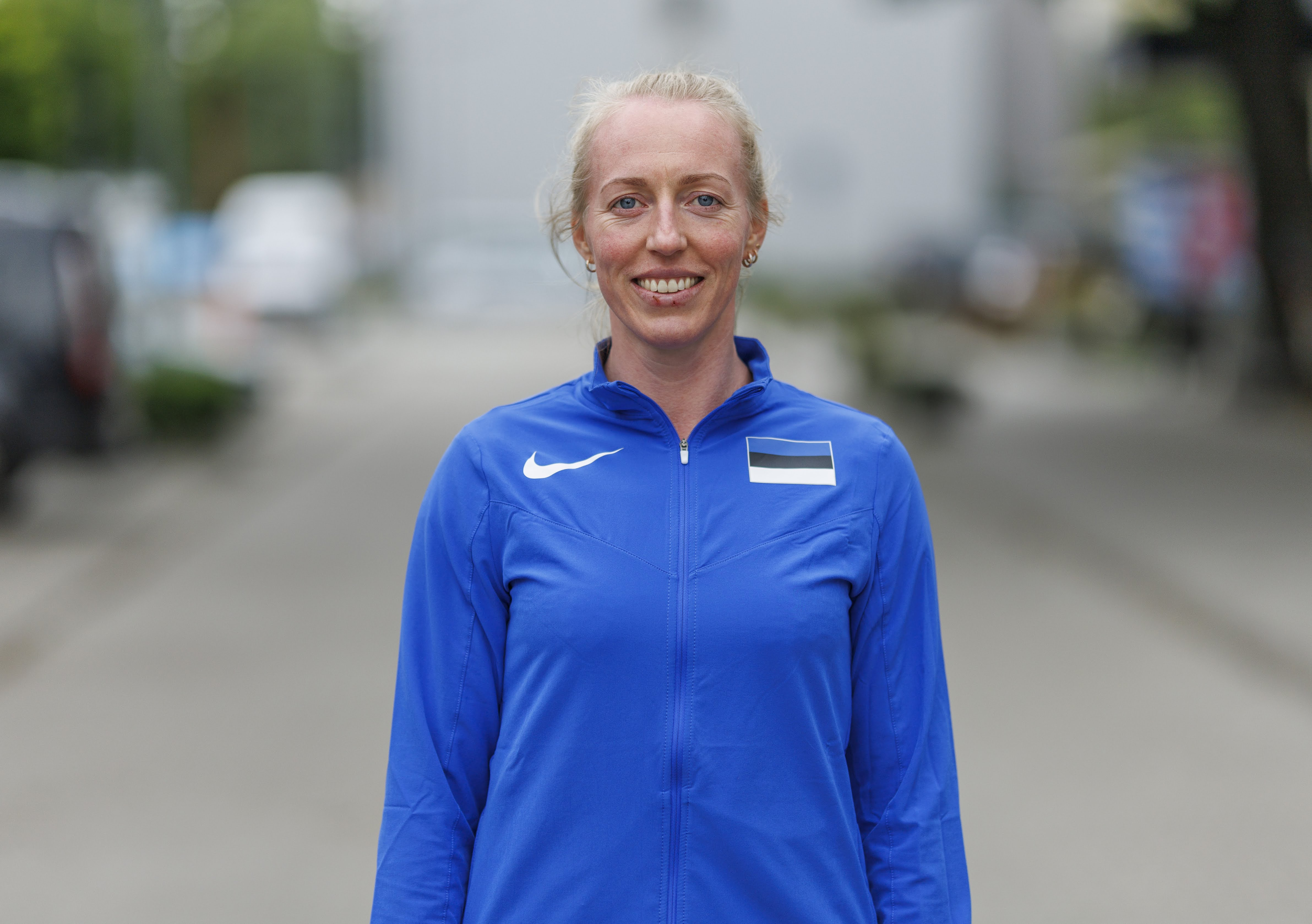
- Differt in 2023

Personal information
- Nationality: Estonia
- Born: Nelli Paju; 24 July 1990 (age 35) Haapsalu, Estonia
Medal record
Fencing
Representing Estonia
European Championships
Bronze medal – third place	2023 Plovdiv	Individual

Nelli Differt (née Paju; born 24 July 1990) is an Estonian fencer. She competed in the women's épée event at the 2024 Summer Olympics. She previously competed at the 2023 European Fencing Championships, winning the bronze medal in the same event.

== Life and career ==
Nelli Paju was born in on 24 July 1989, the daughter of Andres and Leelo Paju. She has two siblings. She graduated from the Haapsalu Wiedemann Gymnasium in 2009. She began training as a fencer in 2000, under the guidance of Helen Nelis-Naukas. In 2012, she graduated as a physiotherapist from the University of Tartu.

In 2007, Differt won the European Junior Championships in fencing with the Estonia women's team. In 2010, she and her team were successful, winning the World Cadets and Juniors Fencing Championships. She took part in Fencing at the 2015 Summer Universiade, taking home the bronze medal in the individual épée event on the first day of the competition. It was Estonia's first medal in fencing for ten years.

Differt competed at the 2023 European Fencing Championships in Plovdiv, winning the bronze medal in the women's épée event, after defeating opponents from Georgia, Estonia, Belgium and France. She lost in the semi-finals to Italian Mara Navarria. At the age of 32, it was her first individual adult medal of her career. She then competed in the women's épée event at the 2024 Summer Olympics, winning three matches to reach the semi finals before losing her last two, finishing fourth place . Her national coach is fencer Kaido Kaaberma.

== Personal life ==
She married Gunnar Differt in 2017, taking his surname.
