= Boris Joffe =

Estonian fencer and coach

Boris Joffe (born 10 December 1950) is an Estonian fencer and coach.

He was born in Haapsalu. In 1974 he graduated from Tallinn Pedagogical Institute's Faculty of Physical Education.

He started his fencing exercising in 1962, coached by Endel Nelis. 1968–1978 his coach was Klavdi Jadlovski, and 1978–1983 Andres Liivak. In 1974 he placed individually and teamly 5th at World Fencing Championships. He is multiple-times Estonian champion. 1969–1980 he was a member of Estonian, and 1972–1980 a member of Soviet Union national fencing team.

1994-2005 he was the senior coach of Estonia national fencing team. Students: Toomas Hint, Kaido Kaaberma, Nikolai Novosjolov.

1952-2012 he taught at Tartu University's Institute of Physical Education.

In 2002 he was awarded as Order of the Estonian Red Cross, IV class.
