= Helen Nelis-Naukas =

Estonian fencer and coach

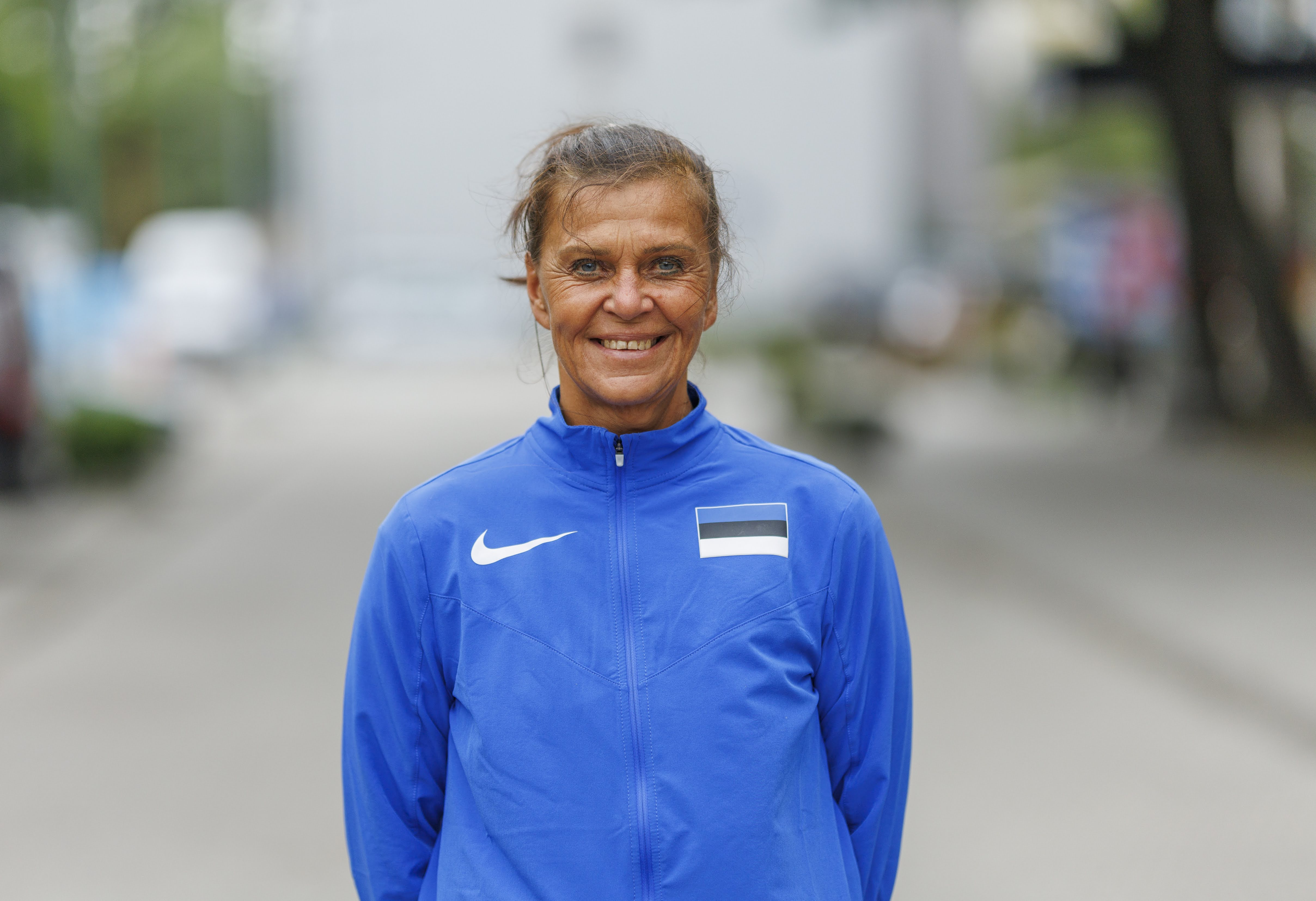
Helen Nelis-Naukas (2023)

Helen Nelis-Naukas (until 1984 Nelis, until 2012 Priinits; born 7 August 1961) is an Estonian fencer and coach.

She was born in Tallinn. Her father was prominent Estonian fencer Endel Nelis. In 1983 she graduated from Tallinn Pedagogical Institute's Faculty of Physical Education.

She started her fencing exercising in 1970, coached by her father, later her coach was Tõnu Nurk. In 1990 he won Estonian Fencing Championships individually.

Since 1983 she is working as a fencing coach. Since 2012 she is working at fencing club En Garde. Students: Marika Koit (Säär), Kristina Kuusk, Nelli Differt (Paju), Katrina Lehis. Her son is fencer Sten Priinits.

Awards:

- 2013: (Estonian: Eesti Kultuurkapitali kehakultuuri ja spordi sihtkapitali aastapreemia)
- 2013: national sport award (Estonian: riiklik spordipreemia)
- 2024 EOK teenetemärk
- 2025 Kultuurikapitali spordi valdkonna peapreemia
