= Alina Karmazina =

Estonian actress (born 1981)

Alina Karmazina (born 19 July 1981) is an Estonian actress.

Karmazina was born in Tallinn. From 2004 to 2009 she worked at the Vanemuine Theatre in Tartu, and since 2013 she is working at the Russian Theatre in Tallinn. She has also played in television series and films.

== Selected roles in television series and films ==
- 2004-2011: Kodu keset linna (television series)
- 2011: Letters to Angel (feature film)
- 2011: Rotilõks (feature film)
- 2012: Europa Blues (feature film)
- 2015: The Fencer (feature film; role: coach from Armenia)
