= Letters to Angel =

2010 film

- Directed by: Sulev Keedus
- Written by: Madis Kõiv; Sulev Keedus
- Produced by: Kaie-Ene Rääk
- Starring: Roman Baskin
- Cinematography: Rein Kotov
- Release date: 27 January 2010
- Running time: 118 minutes
- Country: Estonia
- Language: Estonian

Letters to Angel (Estonian: Kirjad Inglile) is a 2010 Estonian comedy film directed by Sulev Keedus. The film was selected as the Estonian entry for the Best Foreign Language Film at the 84th Academy Awards, but it did not make the final shortlist. It was also nominated to the Estonian Journalists Prize.

== Cast ==
- Roman Baskin
- Ketter Habakukk as Fee
- Alina Karmazina
- Elle Kull
- Katariina Lauk as Hildegard
- Mari-Liis Lill
- Helena Merzin
- Kaie Mihkelson
- Tõnu Oja as Jeremia Juunas Kirotaja
- Ragne Pekarev as Senta
- Mirtel Pohla as Merily
- Rain Simmul as Elvis
- Tiina Tauraite as Edda

== See also ==
- List of submissions to the 84th Academy Awards for Best Foreign Language Film
- List of Estonian submissions for the Academy Award for Best Foreign Language Film
