= Haapsalu shawl =

Traditional shawl originated from Haapsalu, Estonia

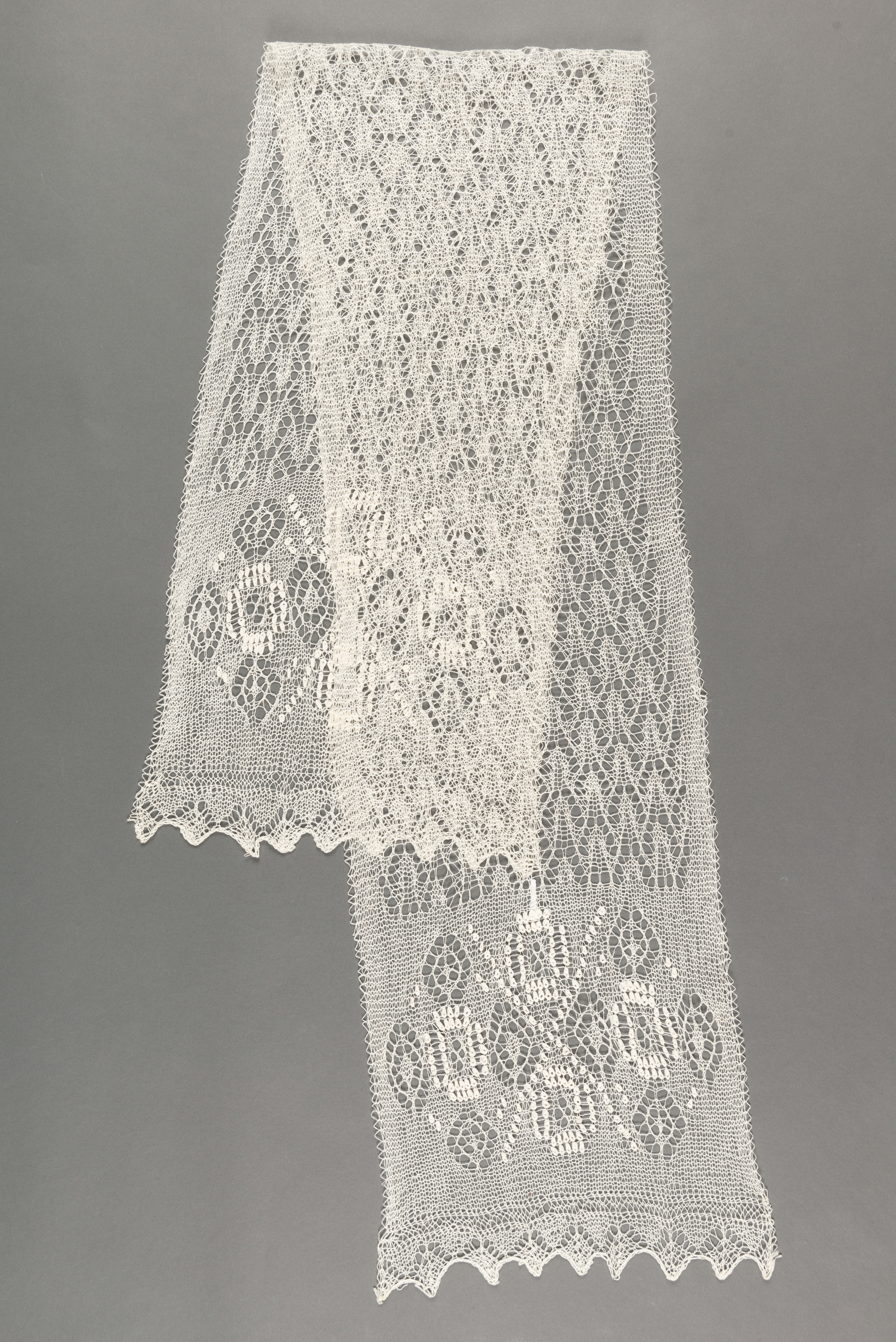
Haapsalu shawl in the collection of Estonian National Museum

A Haapsalu shawl or Haapsalu scarf is a knitted lace shawl that originated in the seaside resort town of Haapsalu, Estonia during the early 19th century.

== Description ==
A traditional Haapsalu shawl is a rectangle measuring 70–80 cm (28–31 in) x 150–170 cm (59–67 in). It consists of three parts: a center section, a border, and an edge, which is knit separately and sewn to the border. The shawls are knit from fine lamb's wool yarn using knitting needles #2-#3. The master artisans knit the shawls so fine that they can be pulled through a lady's wedding ring.

== History ==
Russian aristocrats, including the Romanov family, frequented Haapsalu to bathe in the healing mud salts. Those same spas are in operation today. Those early visitors recognized the trademarks of an artisan and bought the shawls as souvenirs and gifts. Later the Haapsalu shawl became known in Germany and Scandinavia and were sometimes displayed at exhibitions.

== Today ==
The Knitters Guild of Haapsalu has preserved the tradition of the knitted lace shawl. Their works are available at the museum in Haapsalu, Estonia.

Examples of this art can be seen by virtual tour of the Haapsalu Shawl Museum.
