= The Fencer =

2015 film directed by Klaus Härö

- Film poster
- Miekkailija (Finnish); Vehkleja (Estonian)
- Directed by: Klaus Härö
- Written by: Anna Heinämaa
- Produced by: Kaarle Aho; Kai Nordberg
- Starring: Märt Avandi; Ursula Ratasepp; Hendrik Toompere
- Cinematography: Tuomo Hutri
- Edited by: Ueli Christen; Tambet Tasuja
- Music by: Gert Wilden Jr
- Release date: 13 March 2015
- Running time: 98 minutes
- Countries: Estonia; Finland; Germany
- Languages: Estonian; Russian
- Budget: €2 million

The Fencer (Finnish: Miekkailija, Estonian: Vehkleja) is a 2015 biographical drama film about the life of Endel Nelis, an accomplished Estonian fencer and coach. It was directed by Klaus Härö and written by Anna Heinämaa. Filming began in Estonia in late February 2014.

The film was selected as the Finnish entry for the Best Foreign Language Film at the 88th Academy Awards, making the December shortlist of nine films, but it was not nominated. The Fencer was also nominated for the Golden Globe award in the Best Foreign Language Film category as a Finnish-German-Estonian co-production.

The Fencer was released in the U.S. by CFI Releasing in 2017.

== Plot ==
During the Second World War, Estonia was occupied by Nazi Germany, who drafted most of the men into the German army, and then occupied by the Soviet Union, who considered Estonians who had fought in the German army to be criminals. Following the war, the Soviets incorporated Estonia into the USSR.

A young man, Endel Nelis, arrives in Haapsalu in the early 1950s, having left Leningrad to escape the secret police. He finds work as a teacher and founds a sports club for his students, where he starts teaching them his great passion – fencing. Disapproving, the school's principal starts investigating Endel's background. Meanwhile, Endel's Russian friend (and coach) Aleksei warns him not to return to Leningrad under any circumstances.

Fencing becomes a form of self-expression for the children, and Endel becomes a role model and father figure. He learns to love the children, many of whom had been orphaned by the war. When the children want to participate in a national fencing tournament in Leningrad, Endel must make a choice; risk everything to take the children to Leningrad or put his safety first and disappoint them.

== Cast ==
- Märt Avandi – Endel Nelis
- Ursula Ratasepp – Kadri
- Hendrik Toompere Jr. – school principal
- Liisa Koppel – Marta
- Joonas Koff – Jaan
- Lembit Ulfsak – Jaan's grandfather
- Piret Kalda – Jaan's mother
- Egert Kadastu – Toomas
- Ann-Lisett Rebane – Lea
- Elbe Reiter – Tiiu
- Jaak Prints – assistant to the principal
- Kirill Käro – Aleksei
- Leida Rammo – guard in a dormitory
- Raimo Pass – officer
- Erkki Tikan – officer
- Maria Avdjuško – an official in Leningrad
- Alina Karmazina – coach from Armenia

== Critical response ==
On Rotten Tomatoes, the film has an approval rating of 85% based on 55 reviews, and an average score of 6.9/10. The site's critical consensus reads, "The Fencer's inspirational coming-of-age arc is given added heft through sensitive direction, affecting performances, and a moving, fact-based story." On Metacritic, the film has a score of 60 out of 100, based on 13 critics, indicating "mixed or average reviews".

== See also ==
- List of submissions to the 88th Academy Awards for Best Foreign Language Film
- List of Finnish submissions for the Academy Award for Best Foreign Language Film
