= Helena Merzin-Tamm =

Estonian actress

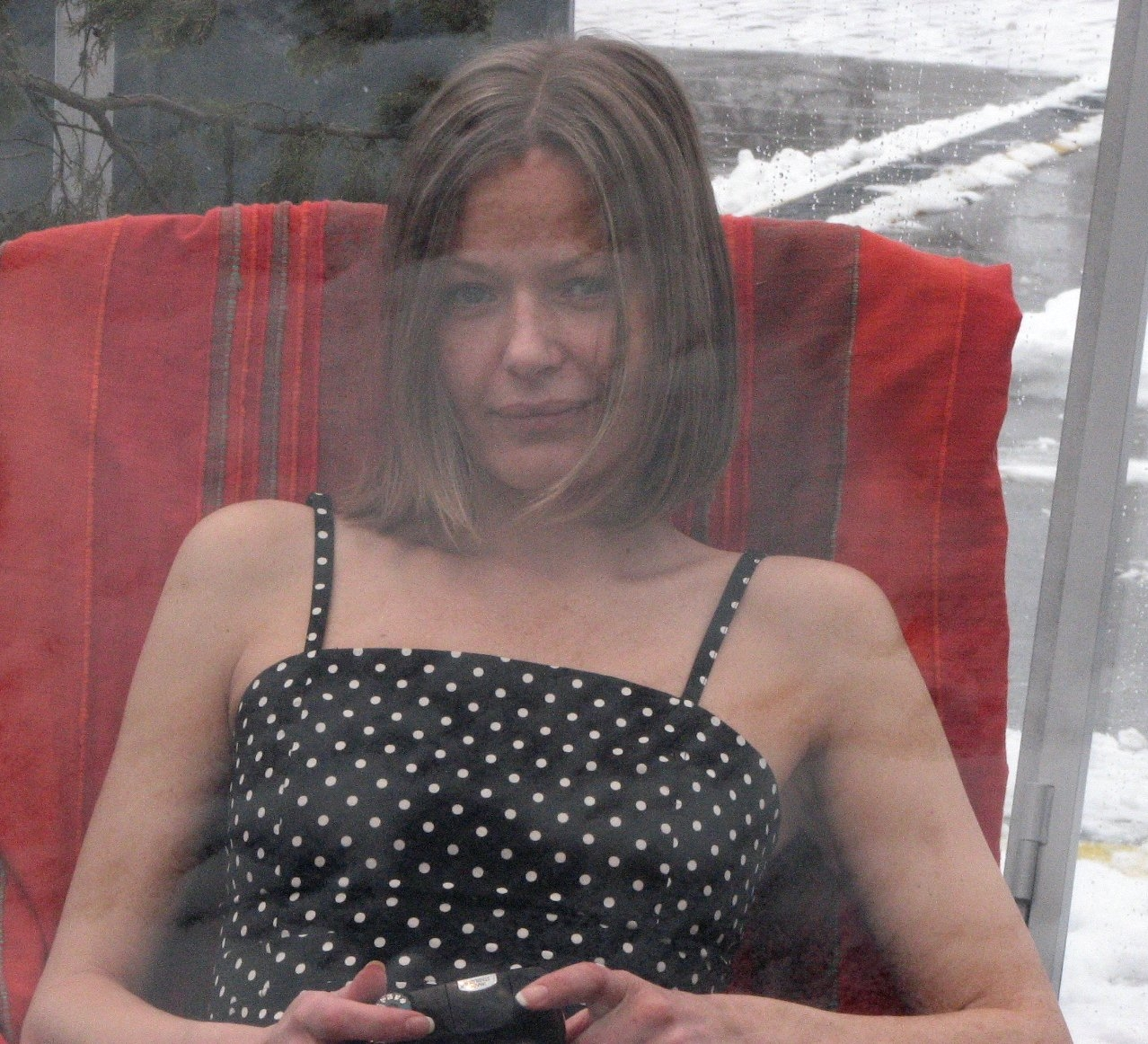
Helena Merzin-Tamm in 2011

Helena Merzin-Tamm (née Merzin; born 7 May 1972) is an Estonian actress.

Helena Merzin was born in Tartu to actor Leonhard Merzin and Tiiu Lukk. She has two half-sisters from her father's previous marriages. In 1990, she graduated from Tartu Secondary School No. 2 (now, the Miina Härma Gymnasium), before enrolling at the Estonian Academy of Music and Theatre, graduating in 1994. From 1994 until 2009, she worked at Vanemuine theatre in Tartu. Besides theatre roles she has played also in several films and television series.

Merzin-Tamm had been in a relationship actor and director Jüri Lumiste, with whom she has a son. Since 2007, she has been married to actor Raivo E. Tamm. The couple have a son.

== Filmography ==
=== Film ===
Year	Title	Role
1993	Candles in the Dark	Natasha Omeltchenko
2008	Taarka	Anna Raudkats
2010	Lumekuninganna	Woman
2011	Rat Trap	Woman with a Van
2011	Letters to Angel	
2011	Vahetus	Signe
2013	Love Is Blind	Maret
2017	Mehetapja/Süütu/Vari	Luise
2018	Portugal	Ann
2018	Take It or Leave It	Social Worker
2021	Kolmapäev	Karin
2022	Feetless Shoes	
2023	Dark Paradise	Woman #1

=== Television ===
Year	Title	Role
1995	Wikmani poisid	Gunilla
1996–1999	Õnne 13	Stella
2012	Alpimaja	Merike Raja
2013–2014	Kerge elu	Stella Karik
2018	Lõks	Doctor
2018	Revenge Office	Vilja Boston
