= Endel Nelis =

Estonian fencer and coach

Endel Nelis (28 September 1925 Karuse Parish, Lääne County – 12 April 1993 Haapsalu) was an Estonian fencer and fencing coach.

In 1950 he graduated from Tartu State University in physical education. From 1950 to 1966 he was a member of Estonian national escadron team. In 1955 and 1961 he was the Estonian champion in fencing. After an active fencing career, he taught fencing at Haapsalu sport school.

The 2015 Finnish-Estonian-German film The Fencer, directed by Klaus Härö, is loosely based on the life of Endel Nelis.

Awards:

- 1967: Estonian SSR merited coach
