= Haapsalu =

Town in Estonia

- Town
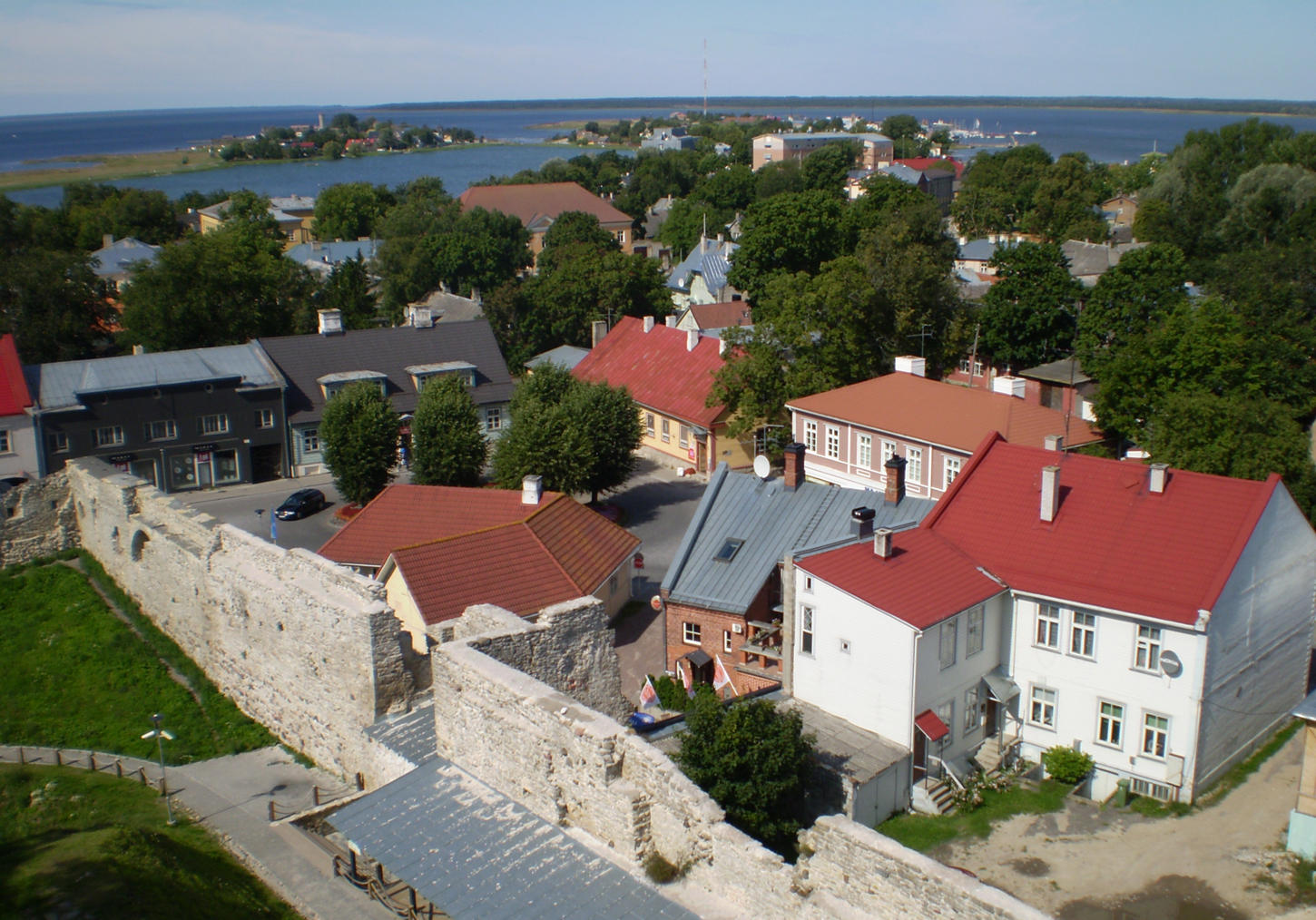
- View from Haapsalu Castle

- Location within Estonia Location within Baltic Sea region Location within Europe
- Coordinates: 58°56′22″N 23°32′27″E
- Country: Estonia
- County: Lääne
- Municipality: Haapsalu
- Town rights: 1279

Area
  - Total: 11.09 km^{2} (4.28 sq mi)
- Elevation: 10 m (33 ft)

Population (2024)
  - Total: 9,812
  - Rank: 14th
  - Density: 884.8/km^{2} (2,292/sq mi)

Ethnicity (2021)
  - Estonians: 83.5%
  - Russians: 11.9%
  - other: 4.6%
- Time zone: UTC+2 (EET)
  - Summer (DST): UTC+3 (EEST)
- Postal code: 90503 to 90507
- Area code: (+372) 047
- Vehicle registration: S

Haapsalu (Estonian pronunciation: [ˈhɑːpsɑlu]) is a seaside resort town located on the west coast of Estonia. It is the administrative centre of Lääne County, and on 1 January 2020 it had a population of 9,375.

== History ==
The name Haapsalu derives from the Estonian words haab 'aspen' and salu in the archaic sense '(forested) island' (now 'grove'). Until the first half of the 20th century, in Swedish and German the town was called Hapsal. Haapsalu and the surrounding area was the center for the Estonian Swedes from the 13th century until the evacuation of almost all ethnic Swedes from Estonia prior to the Soviet invasion of Estonia during World War II in 1944.

The first written record of Haapsalu dates back to 1279, when the town was chartered and became the capital of the Bishopric of Ösel-Wiek, which it remained for the following three centuries. Buildings from those early days remain today, including an episcopal castle, which has the largest single-nave church in Estonia.

== Neighborhoods of Haapsalu ==
There are six neighborhoods of Haapsalu:

- Holmi
- Kesklinn
- Männiku
- Paralepa
- Randsalu
- Vanalinn.

== Healing by sea mud ==
The sea mud in Haapsalu is claimed to have a curative effect. A military doctor, Carl Abraham Hunnius, founded the first mud cure resort in 1825. News of the "curative mud" spread quickly amongst the wealthy customers in then capital city Saint Petersburg, and elsewhere in the former Russian Empire. The mud spas were frequented by the Russian imperial Romanov family. For almost 200 years, Haapsalu has been a popular summer destination where people from all around the world come for medical treatment. At present, there are three "mud cure" establishments in Haapsalu.

== Other attractions ==
The Wonder Land of Ilon Wikland (Wiklandia), a recreation centre for children, is a attraction for the younger kids. Wikland, a famous book illustrator, has had a strong bond with Haapsalu since her childhood.

The August Blues Festival is held every year in August in Haapsalu.

Since 2005, the town hosts Haapsalu Horror and Fantasy Film Festival, an annual film festival dedicated to genre films. In 2017, the pastors of Haapsalu made an open statement calling to end the city's financing of the festival, claiming the horror and violence depicted in the screened films were not fit to represent the resort town image. The same year the festival was held to a record-breaking attendance.

Haapsalu is well-known for its summer festivals and as a resort town it hosts many: American Beauty Summer Meet, Italian Wine Party, August Blues, The White Lady Days, amongst others.

== Demographics ==
Ethnic composition 1922-2021
Ethnicity	1922		1934		1941		1959		1970		1979		1989		2000		2011		2021	
Ethnicity	amount	%	amount	%	amount	%	amount	%	amount	%	amount	%	amount	%	amount	%	amount	%	amount	%
Estonians	3597	84.9	4103	88.3	3580	94.5	6819	79.6	8417	73.3	9058	69.5	9704	66.4	9587	79.5	8404	82.0	8016	83.5
Russians	178	4.20	125	2.69	57	1.50	-	-	2220	19.3	2987	22.9	3726	25.5	1841	15.3	1427	13.9	1140	11.9
Ukrainians	-	-	0	0.00	-	-	-	-	296	2.58	441	3.38	547	3.74	287	2.38	181	1.77	127	1.32
Belarusians	-	-	-	-	-	-	-	-	99	0.86	186	1.43	233	1.59	97	0.80	61	0.60	58	0.60
Finns	-	-	5	0.11	6	0.16	-	-	62	0.54	81	0.62	77	0.53	64	0.53	57	0.56	60	0.63
Jews	9	0.21	5	0.11	0	0.00	-	-	23	0.20	20	0.15	12	0.08	5	0.04	4	0.04	3	0.03
Latvians	-	-	10	0.22	3	0.08	-	-	44	0.38	40	0.31	32	0.22	9	0.07	12	0.12	15	0.16
Germans	304	7.17	251	5.40	-	-	-	-	-	-	46	0.35	48	0.33	16	0.13	8	0.08	6	0.06
Tatars	-	-	0	0.00	-	-	-	-	-	-	38	0.29	38	0.26	15	0.12	10	0.10	11	0.11
Poles	-	-	11	0.24	11	0.29	-	-	-	-	21	0.16	18	0.12	9	0.07	4	0.04	7	0.07
Lithuanians	-	-	0	0.00	1	0.03	-	-	26	0.23	24	0.18	27	0.18	24	0.20	18	0.18	15	0.16
unknown	0	0.00	1	0.02	0	0.00	0	0.00	0	0.00	0	0.00	0	0.00	34	0.28	13	0.13	37	0.39
other	149	3.52	138	2.97	131	3.46	1748	20.4	296	2.58	93	0.71	155	1.06	66	0.55	52	0.51	101	1.05
Total	4237	100	4649	100	3789	100	8567	100	11483	100	13035	100	14617	100	12054	100	10251	100	9595	100.01

== In popular culture ==
Drone video of Haapsalu promenade, peninsula of Krimmi holm, Tagalaht and Haapsalu old town in June 2022

Pyotr Ilyich Tchaikovsky in 1867 wrote a suite of three pieces for piano during his stay in Haapsalu, titled Souvenir de Hapsal.

In the 19th century, the town became famous for its "Haapsalu shawls", a delicate craft made by local women.

Haapsalu has sometimes been called the "Venice of the Baltics" — an apparent exaggeration used mostly to promote the resort town to foreign tourists.

Haapsalu is site of a fencing school founded by Estonian fencer Endel Nelis, used as the setting of the Finnish-Estonian film The Fencer.

== Gallery ==
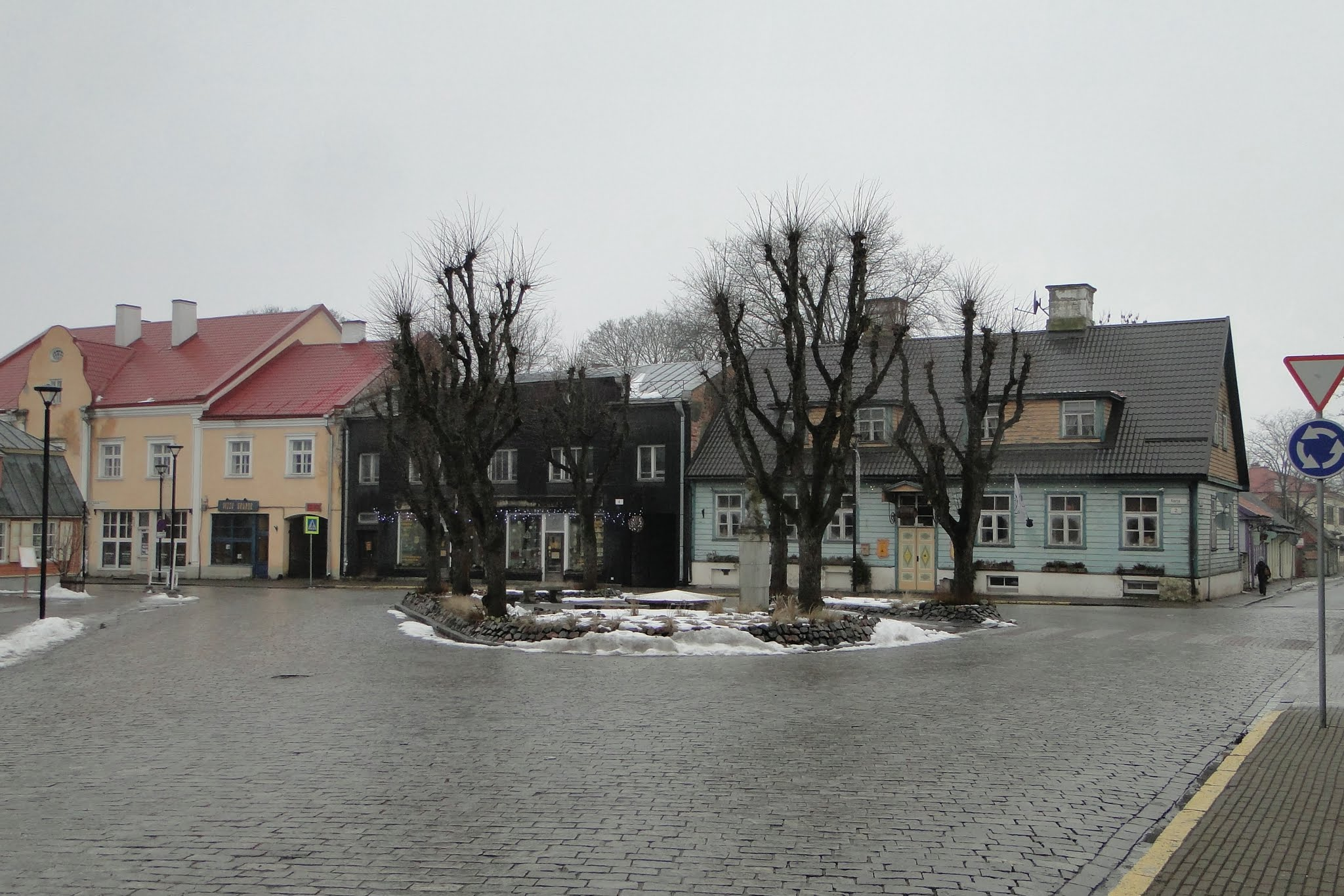
Central square

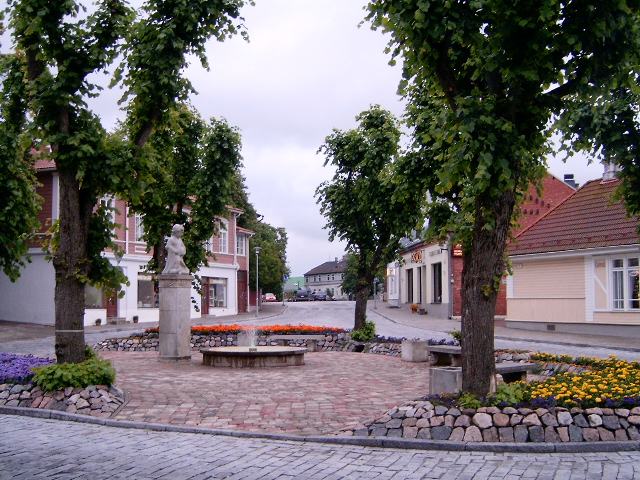
Town centre

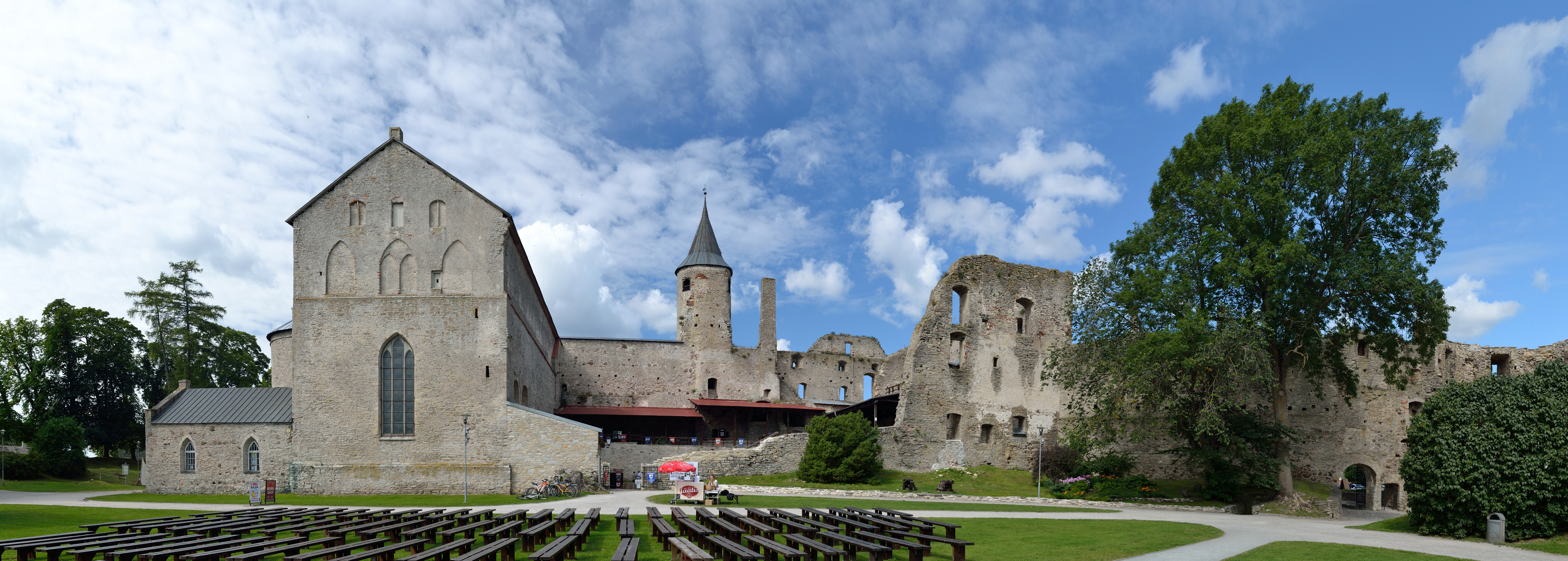
Haapsalu castle

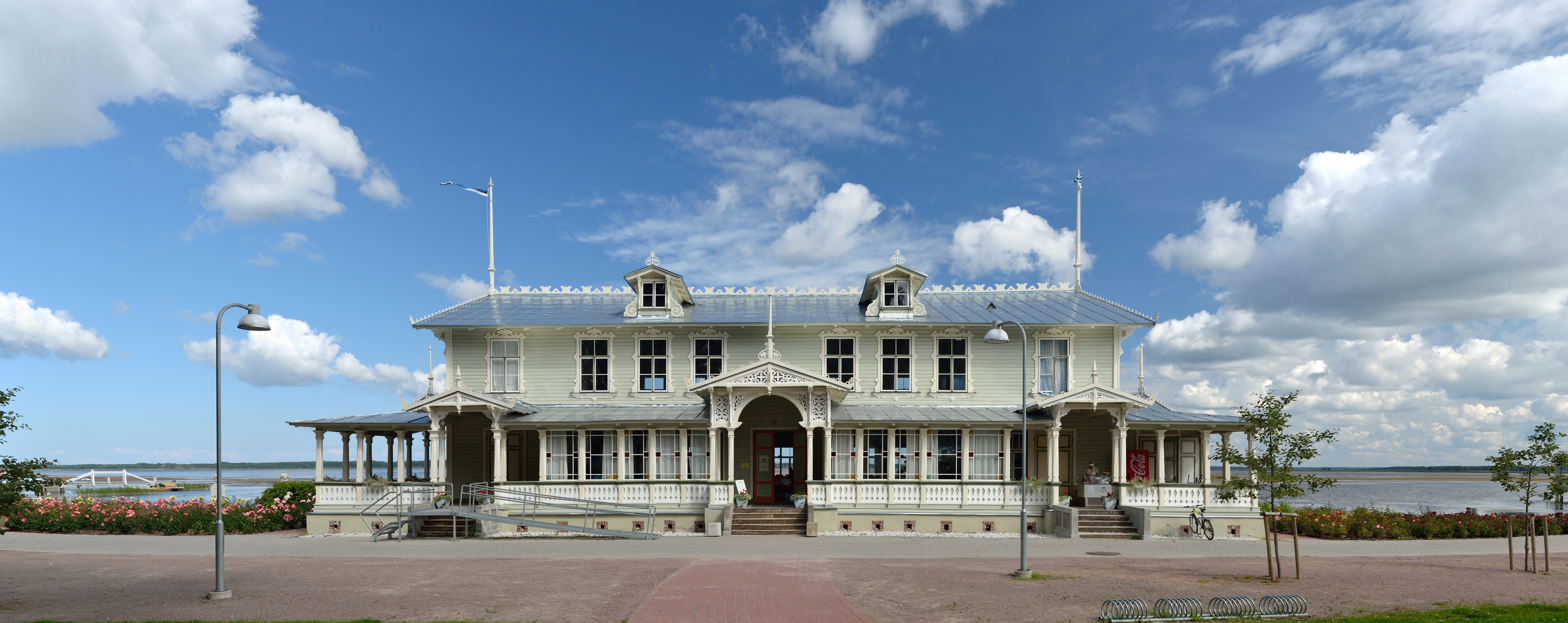
Haapsalu kuursaal (resort hall)

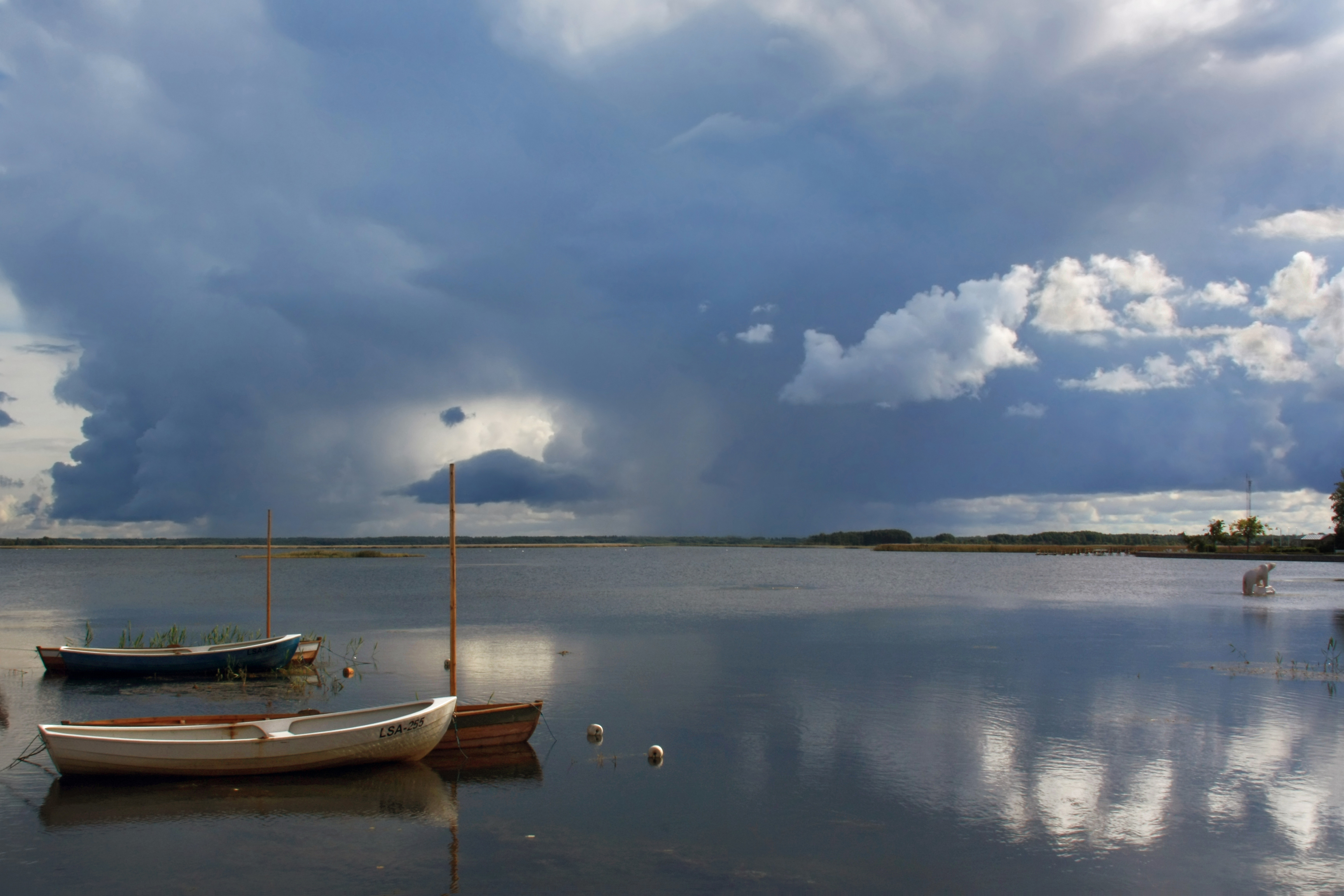
Bay of Haapsalu Tagalaht

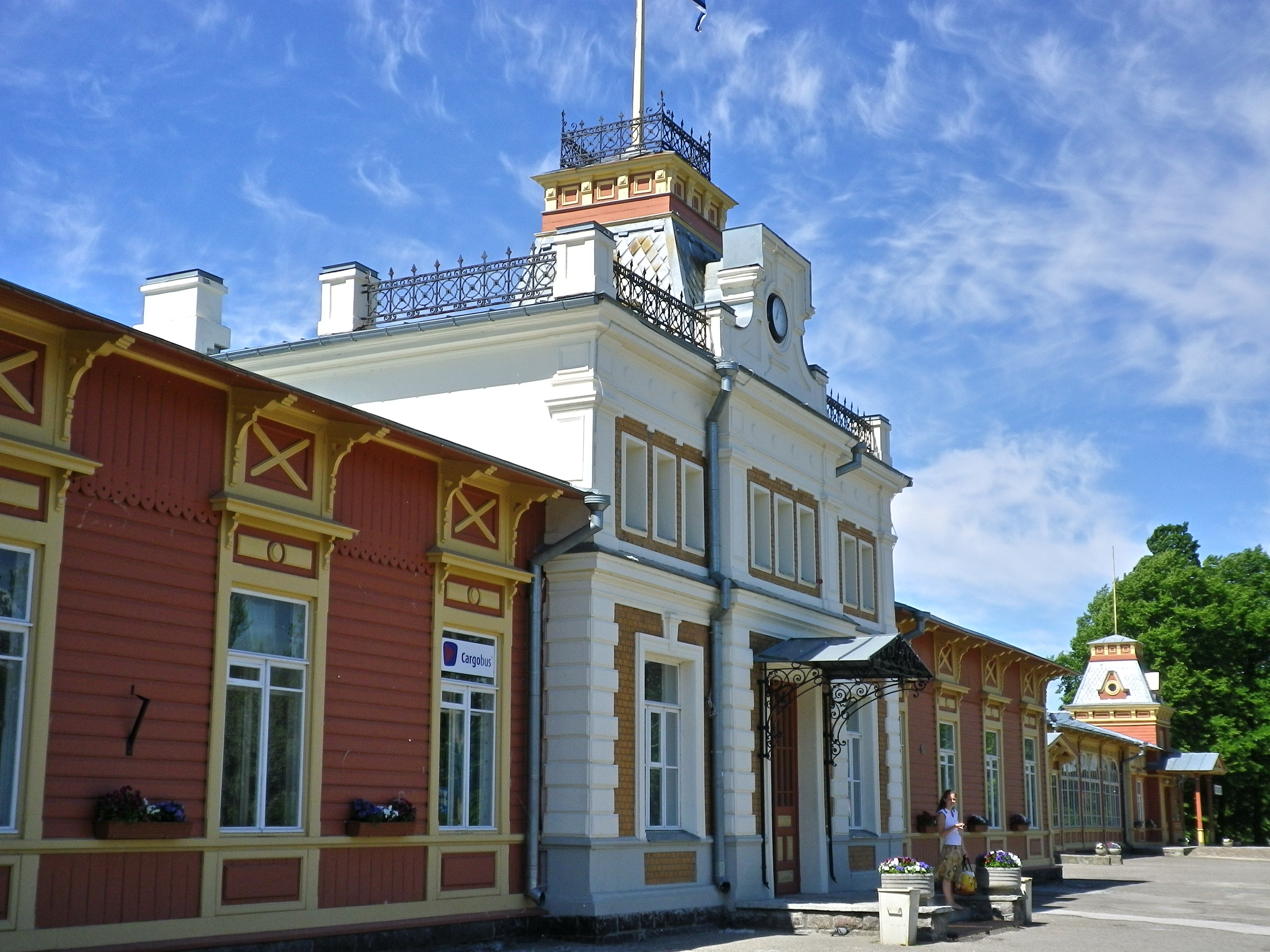
Former train station, notable for the length of its platform canopy.

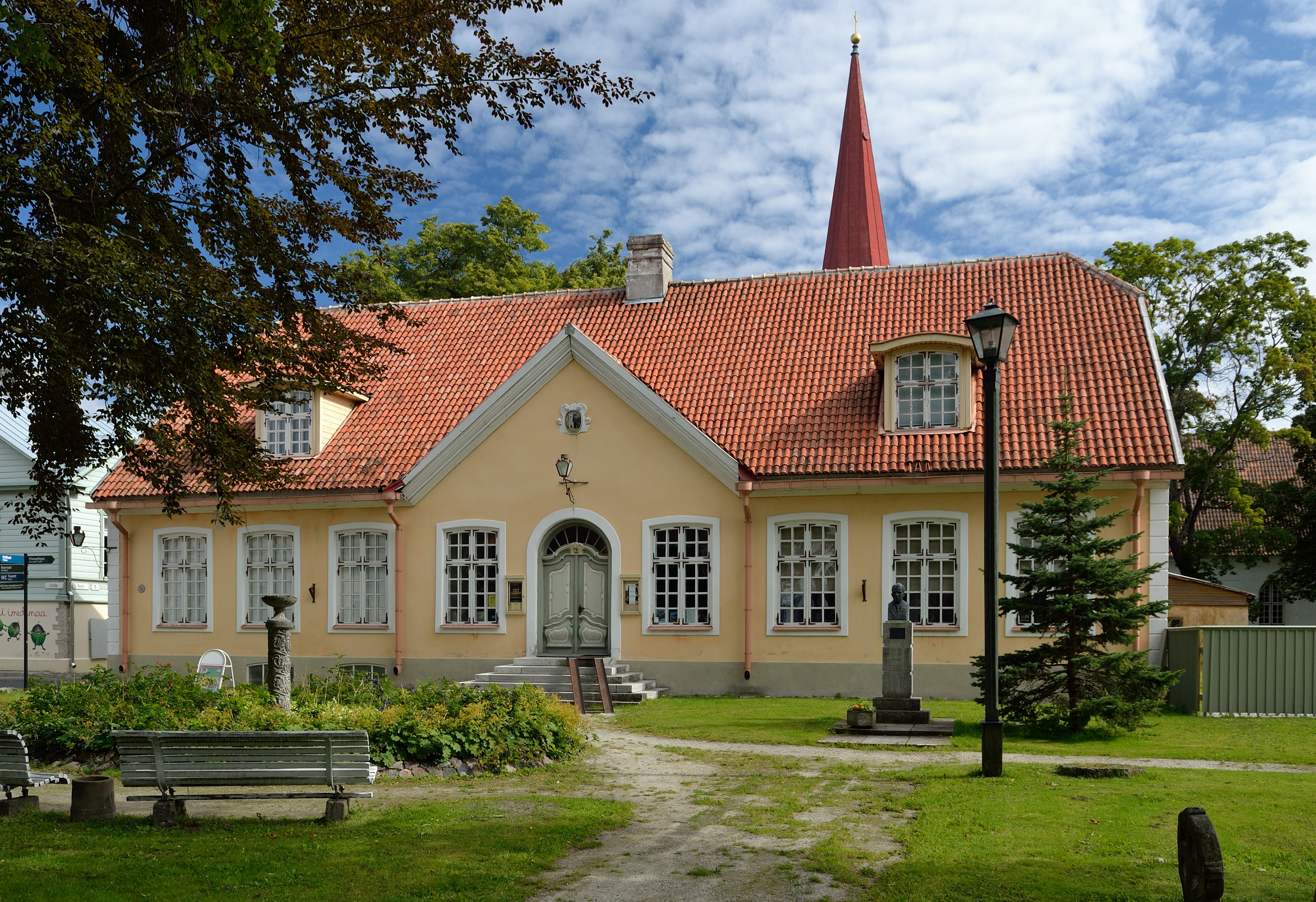
Town Hall

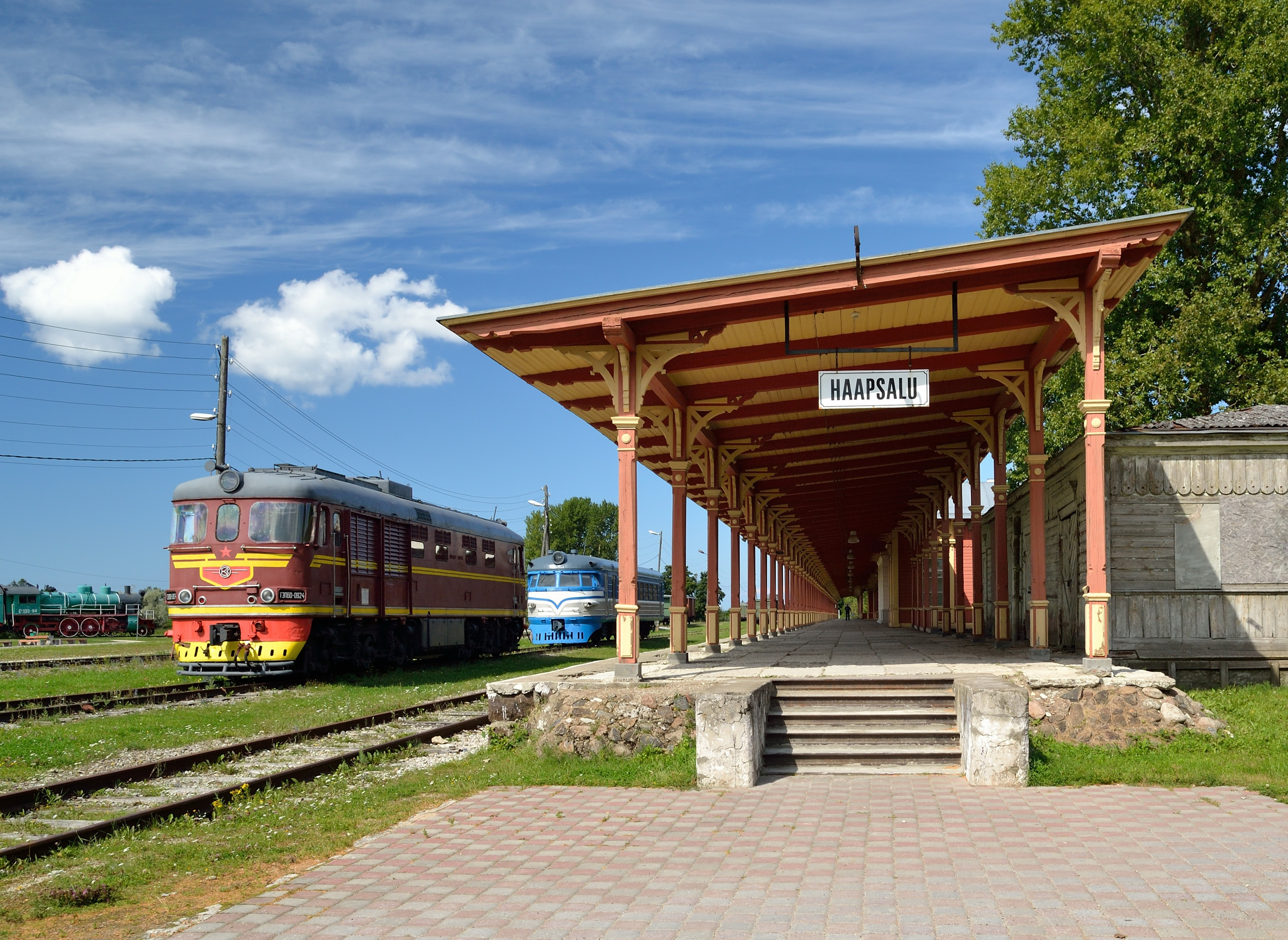
Train station

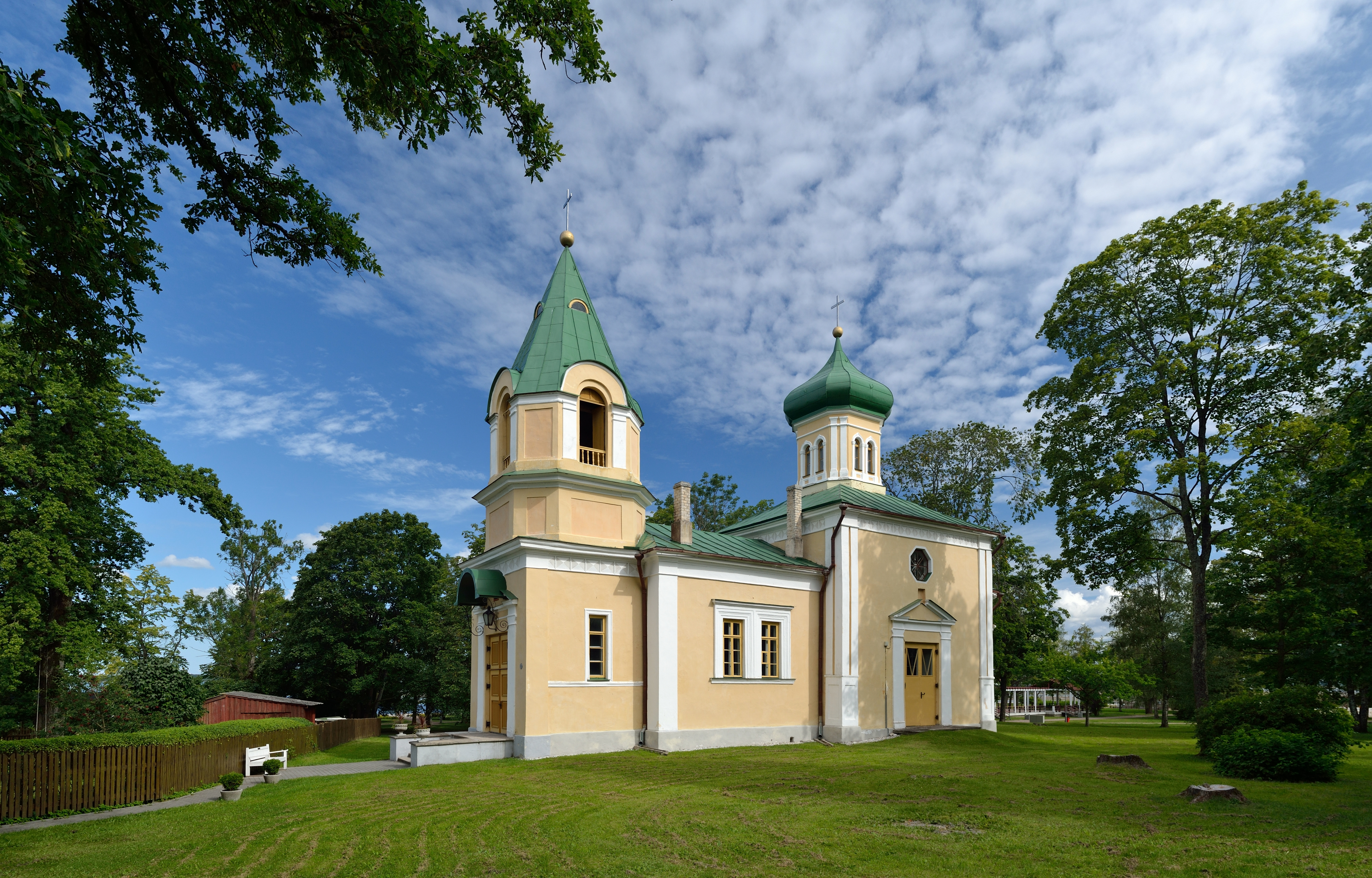
Orthodox Church of St. Mary Magdalene

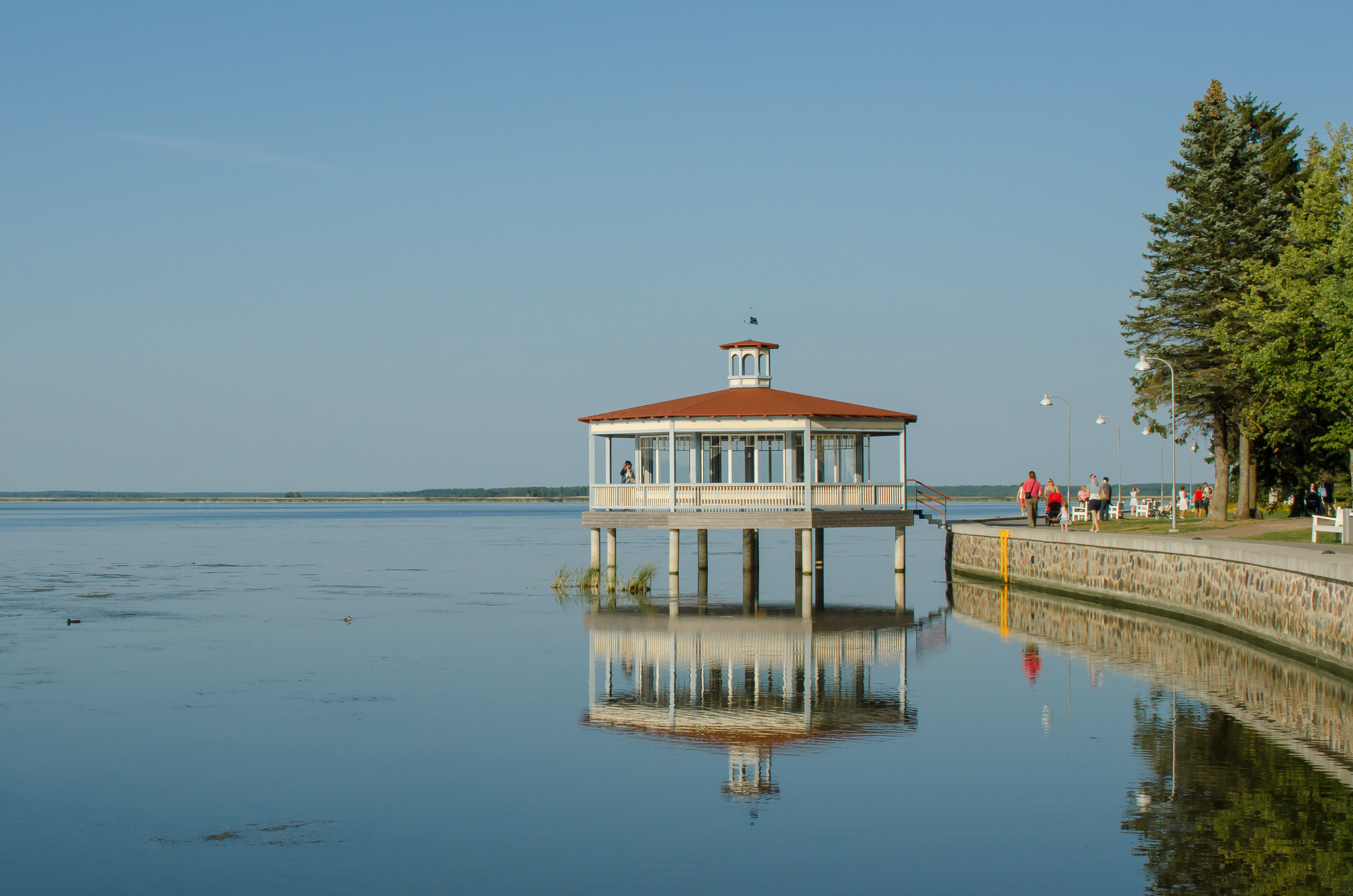
A pavilion by the seaside promenade

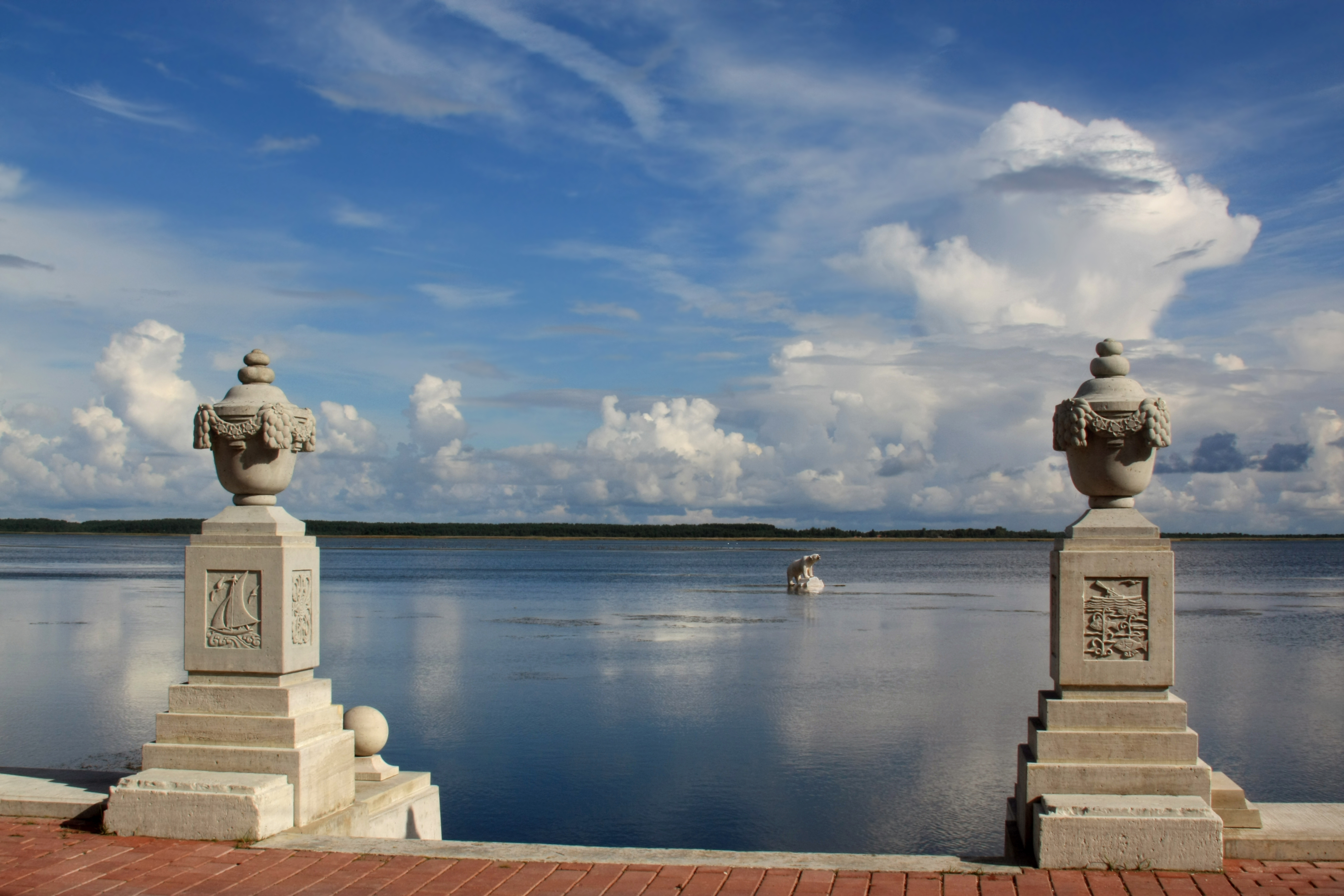
View from the promenade

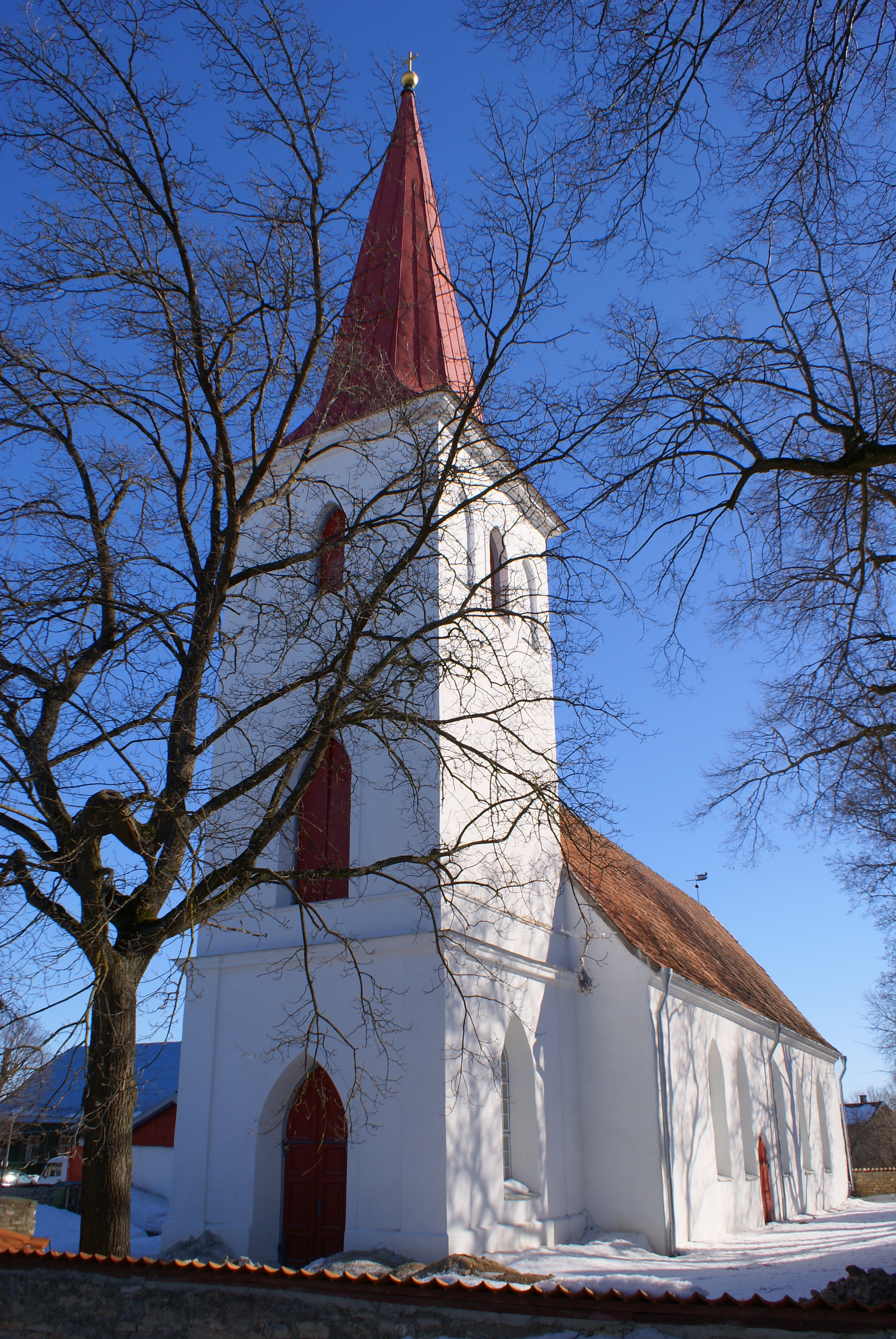
Jaani Lutheran church

== Notable people ==
- Evert Horn (1585–1615), a Swedish field marshal and governor of Narva
- Carl Henrik Wrangel (1681–1755), Field marshal in the Swedish Army
- Prince Alexander Gorchakov (1798–1883), a Russian diplomat and statesman
- Viktor von Maydell (1838–1898), a Baltic German railway engineer and politician and mayor of Reval, 1885 to 1894.
- Anna Hedvig Büll (1887–1981), a missionary who saved the lives of several thousand Armenians
- Cyrillus Kreek (1889–1962), an Estonian composer, died locally.
- Viive Aamisepp (1936–2023), stage and film actress
- Olev Laanjärv (born 1942), lawyer and politician, Minister of the Interior, 1990 to 1992
- Andres Lipstok (born 1957), chairman of the Bank of Estonia, 2005-2012 & VP of the Estonian Olympic Committee 2004-2008.
- Lauri Luik (born 1982), politician, member of the 11th, 12th and 13th Riigikogu

=== Sport ===
- Nikolai Vekšin (1887–1951), sailor and team bronze medallist at the 1928 Summer Olympics
- Nikolai Novosjolov (born 1980), épée fencer, and four-time Olympian competitor
- Rimo Hunt (born 1985), footballer, played over 320 games plus 7 for Estonia
- Katrina Lehis (born 1994), an épée fencer; at the 2020 Summer Olympics, won an individual bronze and a team gold medal

== See also ==
- Haapsalu shawl
- Haapsalu linnastaadion
- August Blues Festival
