= Jaan Talts =

Estonian weightlifter (born 1944)

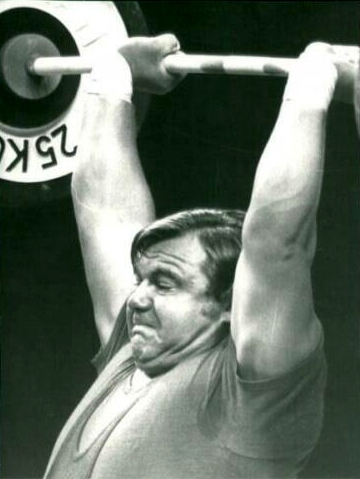
- Talts at the 1972 Summer Olympics

Personal information
- Nationality: Estonian
- Born: 19 May 1944 (age 82) Massiaru, Estonia
- Height: 174 cm (5 ft 9 in)

Sport
- Sport: Weightlifting
Medal record
Representing the Soviet Union
Olympic Games
Gold medal – first place	1972 Munich	-110 kg
Silver medal – second place	1968 Mexico City	-90 kg
World Championships
Gold medal – first place	1970 Columbus	-110 kg
Gold medal – first place	1972 Munich	-110 kg
Silver medal – second place	1968 Mexico City	-90 kg
Silver medal – second place	1969 Warsaw	-110 kg
European Championships
Gold medal – first place	1968 Leningrad	-90 kg
Gold medal – first place	1969 Warsaw	-110 kg
Gold medal – first place	1970 Szombathely	-110 kg
Gold medal – first place	1972 Constanţa	-110 kg

Jaan Talts (born 19 May 1944) is an Estonian former weightlifter. He competed for the Soviet Union at the 1968 and 1972 Olympics and won a silver and a gold medal, respectively. Throughout his career, Talts won two world and four European titles and set approximately 40 world records.

== Biography ==
As a teenager Talts trained in athletics, in throwing events. He took up weightlifting while studying at the Tihemetsa Technical College of Agriculture and Forestry. In 1967 he became the first middle-heavyweight weightlifter to break the 500 kg barrier in the total, and hence was named the best Soviet athlete of the year.

After retiring from competitions Talts coached weightlifters in Estonia, and starting from 2007 headed the Estonian national weightlifting team. Between 1981 and 1988 he served as rector of the Estonian Sports Academy. Since 1989 he works with the Estonian National Olympic Committee in various positions.

In 1995–1996 Talts was member of the Estonian parliament Riigikogu. In 1998 he was inducted into the International Weightlifting Federation hall of fame.

== Major results ==
Year	Venue	Body Weight	Military Press (kg)				Snatch (kg)				Clean & Jerk (kg)				Total	Rank
Year	Venue	Body Weight	1	2	3	Rank	1	2	3	Rank	1	2	3	Rank	Total	Rank
Olympic Games
1972	Munich, West Germany	109.50	~~200.0~~	200.0	210.0 OR	1	157.5	~~165.0~~	165.0	3	~~205.0~~	205.0	~~225.0~~	3	580.0 OR	1st place, gold medalist(s)
European Championships

Key: OR = Olympic record; DNF = did not finish; NVL = no valid lift

Awards
Preceded by Mart Vilt	Estonian Sportsman of the Year; 1967–1970	Succeeded by Vambola Helm
Preceded by Vambola Helm	Estonian Sportsman of the Year; 1972	Succeeded by Ain Vilde
