= Raissa Ruus =

Estonian middle-distance runner

Personal information
- Nationality: Estonian
- Born: 18 September 1942
- Died: 14 January 1986 (aged 43)

Sport
- Sport: Middle-distance running
- Event: 800 metres

Raissa Ruus (18 September 1942 – 14 January 1986) was an Estonian middle-distance runner. She competed in the women's 800 metres at the 1972 Summer Olympics.

Awards and achievements
Preceded by Luule Tull	Estonian Sportswoman of the Year; 1972	Succeeded by Illa Raudik
