= Virve (given name) =

Female given name

Virve is an Estonian and Finnish feminine given name and may refer to:

- Virve Aben (born 1930), Estonian textile artist
- Virve Aruoja (1922–2013), Estonian television and film director and actress
- Virve Eliste (1949–1949), youngest deportee during the Operation Priboi
- Virve Holtsmeier (born 1944), Estonian archer
- Virve Kiil (born 1973), Estonian glass artist
- Virve Kiple (1927–2009), Estonian ballerina and actress
- Virve Koppel (1931–2016), Estonian television and film director
- Virve-Elfriide Köster (1928–2022; better known as Kihnu Virve), Estonian folk singer from Kihnu island
- Virve Laev (born 1928), Estonian film editor
- Virve Osila (born 1946), Estonian poet and playwright
- Virve Reid (born 1956), Canadian adult model
- Virve Rosti (born 1958; better known as Vicky Rosti), Finnish singer
- Virve Sarapik (born 1961), Estonian art scientist and semiotician

Surname

- Tõnu Virve (1946–2019), Estonian theatre and film designer and artist, producer and director

== See also ==
- Virve (disambiguation)
