= Erika Salumäe =

Estonian cyclist

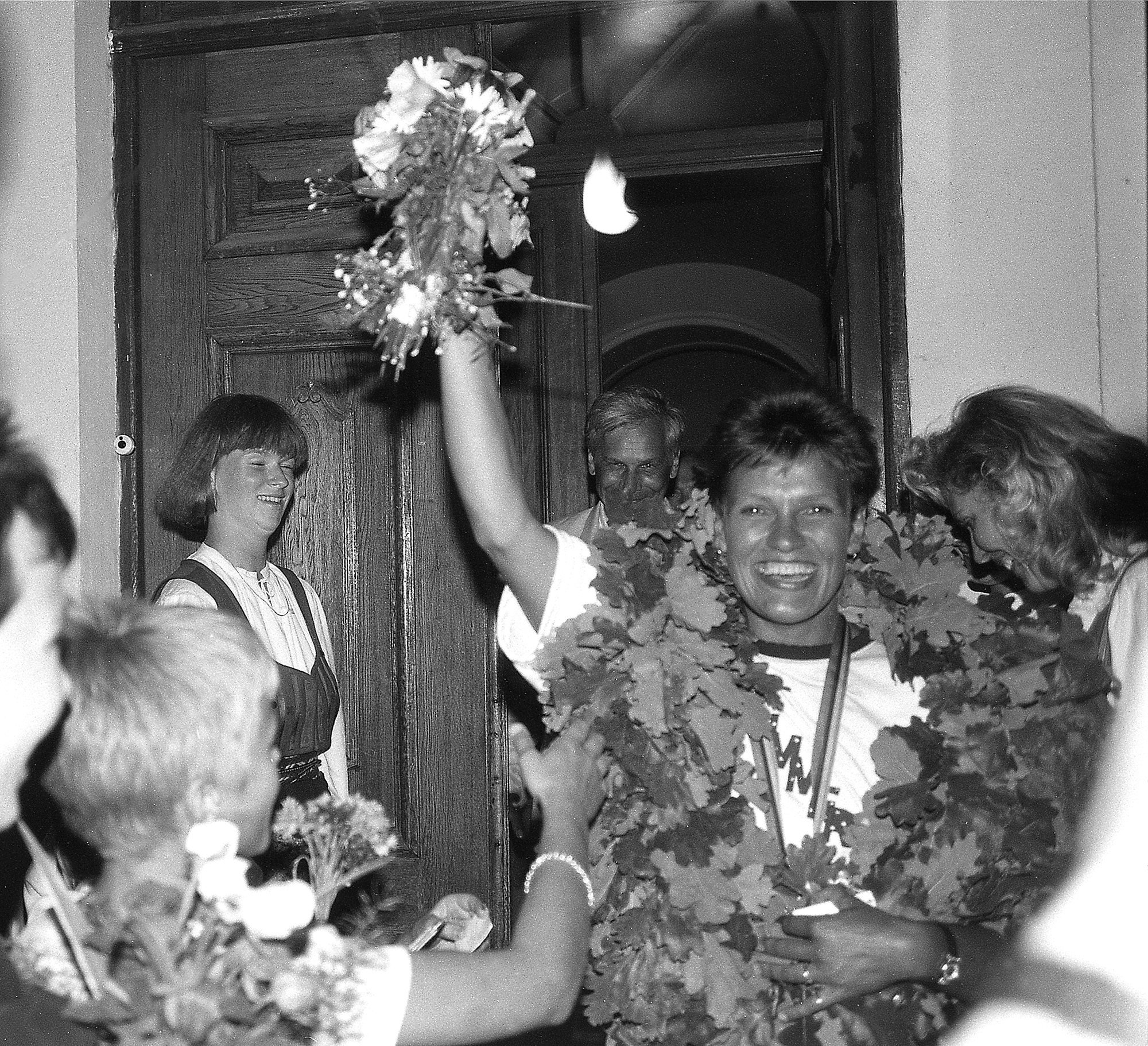
- Erika Salumäe in 1992

Personal information
- Full name: Erika Salumäe
- Born: 11 June 1962 (age 64) Pärnu, then part of Estonian SSR, Soviet Union

Cycling career
- Sport: Cycling
- Discipline: Track cycling
- Role: Rider
Medal record
Women's track cycling
International track cycling competitions
Event	1st	2nd	3rd
Olympic Games	2	0	0
World Championships	2	2	1
Summer Universiade	2	1	0
Total	6	3	1
Representing Estonia
Olympic Games
Gold medal – first place	1992 Barcelona	Sprint
World Championships
Bronze medal – third place	1995 Bogotá	Sprint
Representing the Soviet Union
Olympic Games
Gold medal – first place	1988 Seoul	Sprint
World Championships
Gold medal – first place	1987 Vienna	Sprint
Gold medal – first place	1989 Lyon	Sprint
Silver medal – second place	1984 Barcelona	Sprint
Silver medal – second place	1986 Colorado Springs	Sprint
Summer Universiade
Gold medal – first place	1983 Edmonton	Sprint
Gold medal – first place	1983 Edmonton	Time trial
Silver medal – second place	1983 Edmonton	Points race

Erika Salumäe (born 11 June 1962) is an Estonian track bicycle racer who won the first Olympic gold medal for Estonia in fifty-six years after the country regained independence in 1991.

Salumäe was born in Pärnu, Estonia. She trained at VSS Kalev in Tallinn. At the 1983 Summer Universiade she won two gold medals, in the women's sprint and women's 500 m time trial and the silver medal in the women's points race. Salumäe won the gold medal in track cycling at the 1988 Summer Olympics in Seoul, competing for the USSR team and in the 1992 Summer Olympics in Barcelona, competing for Estonia.

At World Championships from 1984 to 1989, she won 2 golds (1987 and 1989), 2 silvers (1984 and 1986) and 1 bronze (1995). From 1982 to 1989, she set 15 world records and was elected the Best Estonian Athlete in 1983, 1984, 1987–1990, 1992, 1995, and 1996.

Salumäe served in the Riigikogu from 1999 to 2003, and from 2007 until her resignation that year. She also served as a member of Tallinn City Council.

== In popular culture ==
Salumäe is the subject of a 2026 biographical film, Our Erika , co-written and directed by German Golub. In the film, Salumäe is played by the Estonian actor Karolin Jürise.

Awards
Preceded by Inna Rose	Estonian Sportswoman of the Year; 1983 – 1984	Succeeded by Kaija Parve-Helinurm
Preceded by Kaija Parve-Helinurm	Estonian Sportswoman of the Year; 1987 – 1990	Succeeded by Kristiina Nurk
Preceded by Kristiina Nurk	Estonian Sportswoman of the Year; 1992	Succeeded by Oksana Jermakova
Preceded by Margrit Tooman	Estonian Sportswoman of the Year; 1995 – 1996	Succeeded by Kristina Šmigun
