= Indrikson =

Indrikson is a surname. Notable people with the surname include:

- Kaire Indrikson (born 1961), retired Estonian backstroke swimmer
- Ulvi Indrikson, birth name of Ulvi Voog, (born 1937), Estonian former freestyle swimmer

== See also ==
- Indriksons
