= Uno Palu =

Estonian decathlete (1933–2024)

Medal record

Men's athletics

Representing Soviet Union

European Championships
Silver medal – second place	1958 Stockholm	Decathlon

Uno Palu (8 February 1933 – 15 January 2024) was an Estonian decathlete who represented the USSR. He trained at Dynamo in Tallinn.

At the 1956 Summer Olympics he finished fourth in decathlon. He won a silver medal at the 1958 European Championships.

Palu died on 15 January 2024, at the age of 90.

Awards
Preceded by Feliks Pirts	Estonian Sportspersonality of the Year; 1956	Succeeded by Ulvi Voog
Preceded by Ulvi Voog	Estonian Sportspersonality of the Year; 1958	Succeeded by Paul Keres
