= Alo Toom =

Estonian wrestler

Alo Toom (born 18 March 1986) is an Estonian wrestler.

He was born in Vändra, Pärnu County. In 2005 he graduated from Audentes Sports Gymnasium, and 2015 Tallinn University of Technology in electrical technology.

He began his wrestling career in 1993, coached by Karl Pajumäe. Since 2002 his coach was Henn Põlluste. He has competed at the World Wrestling Championships. He is 5-times Estonian champion in Greco-Roman wrestling. From 2005 to 2015 he was a member of the Estonian national wrestling team.
