= Mihkel Leppik =

Estonian rowing coach (1932–2021)

Personal information
- Nationality: Estonian
- Born: 27 October 1932 Tallinn, Estonia
- Died: 7 July 2021 (aged 88)

Sport
- Country: Estonia
- Sport: Rowing

Mihkel Leppik (27 October 1932 – 7 July 2021) was an Estonian rowing coach.

Leppik was born in Tallinn. In 1953 and 1954 he was six times Estonian champion in different rowing disciplines.

From 1950 onwards, he worked as a rowing coach. His students included Jüri Jaanson, Tõnu Endrekson and Tiit Helmja.

== Awards ==
- 1989 and 1990: Estonian Coach of the Year
- 2005: Order of the Estonian Red Cross, IV class
