= Aavo Põhjala =

Estonian judoka

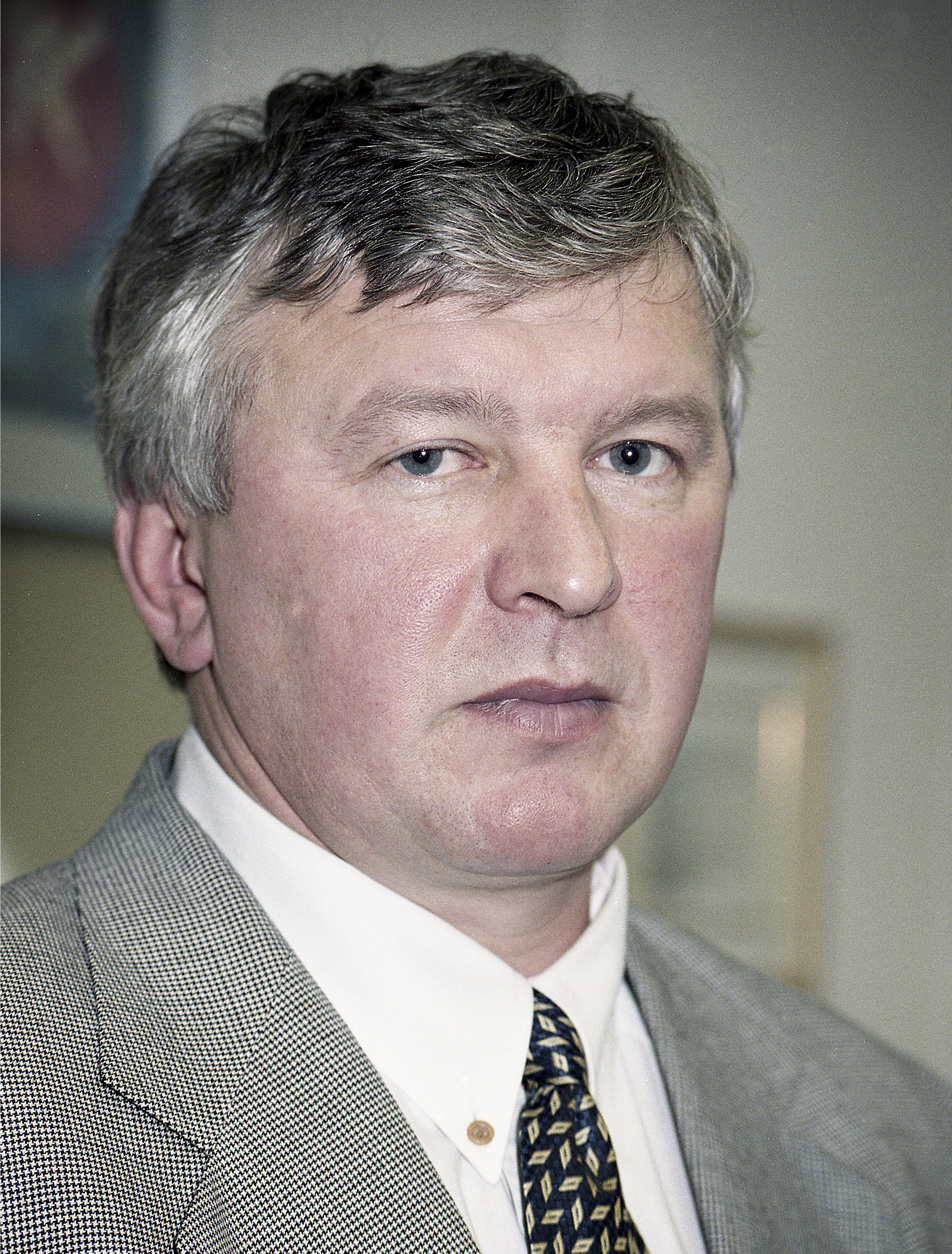
Aavo Põhjala

Aavo Põhjala (born 1 August 1957 in Tartu) is an Estonian judoka and judoka coach.

In 1980 he graduated from Tartu State University in physical education.

1974-1986 he become 14-times Estonian champion in different judo weight categories.

Since 1980 he worked as a judoka coach. 1984-2013 he was the principal coach of Estonian national judoka team.

Students: Indrek Pertelson, Aleksei Budõlin, Dmitri Budõlin, Martin Padar.

Since 2014 he is the president of Estonian Judo Federation.

Awards:

- several times Estonian Judoka of the Year
- 2000: Estonian Coach of the Year
- 2001: Order of the Estonian Red Cross, IV class.
