= Rutt =

Rutt is a both a given name and surname. As a given name, it is most commonly found in Estonia and is a feminine name, a cognate of Ruth, with the name day being 4 January.

Notable people with the surname include:

- Bevan Rutt (1916–1988), Australian architect and philanthropist
- Chris L. Rutt (1859–1936), American journalist and newspaper editor
- John Towill Rutt (1760–1841), English social reformer
- Richard Rutt (1925–2011), English Anglican missionary and Roman Catholic priest
- Nanny Rutt, a fictional character
- Rutt, a character from Disney's Brother Bear

Notable people with the given name include:

- Rutt Hinrikus (1946–2023), Estonian literary scholar and critic
- Rutt Šmigun (born 1954), Estonian cross-country skier
