= Luule =

Female given name

- Gender: Female
- Language: Estonian
- Name day: 22 January

Origin
- Origin: From the Estonian language luule
- Meaning: poetry
- Region of origin: Estonia

Other names
- Related names: Luuli, Lyyli

Luule is an Estonian feminine given name from the Estonian language word luule, meaning "poetry".

As of 1 January 2022, 1,064 women in Estonia have the first name Luule, making it the 170th most popular female name in the country. The name is most common in the 80-84 age group, and most commonly found in Valga County, where 17.27 per 10,000 inhabitants of the county bear the name.

Individuals bearing the name Luule include:

- Luule Epner (born 1953), theatre scholar and literary scholar
- Luule Käis (1929–2022), lawyer and legal scholar
- Luule Komissarov (born 1942), actress
- Luule Sakkeus (born 1956), demographer
- Luule Tull (born 1942), motorcycle racer
- Luule Viilma (1950–2002), physician, esotericist and practitioner of alternative medicine
