= Virve =

Virve may refer to:

- Virve (given name), Estonian feminine given name
- Virve, Estonia, village in Kuusalu Parish, Harju County, Estonia
- VIRVE (Viranomaisradioverkko), Finnish authorities' telecommunications network
