= Kaire Indrikson =

Estonian swimmer

Personal information
- Born: 13 June 1961 (age 65) Tallinn, then part of Estonian SSR, Soviet Union
- Height: 1.78 m (5 ft 10 in)
- Weight: 63 kg (139 lb)

Sport
- Sport: Swimming
- Club: Dynamo
Medal record
Swimming
European Championships
Representing Soviet Union
Silver medal – second place	1977 Jönköping	4×100 m medley
Bronze medal – third place	1977 Jönköping	100 m backstroke

Kaire Indrikson (born 13 June 1961) is a retired Estonian backstroke swimmer who won two medals at the 1977 European Aquatics Championships. The same year she was chosen Estonian Sportspersonality of the year. During her career she set 33 Estonian records, and her record in the 200 m backstroke event stood from 1977 to 2009.

After retiring from competitions she worked as a swimming coach. Her twin sister, Kaja Aljand, is also a former swimmer who competed at the national level.

Awards and achievements
Preceded by Liivi Erm	Estonian Sportswoman of the Year; 1977	Succeeded by Reet Palm
