= Rein Ottoson =

Estonian sailing coach

Rein Ottoson (born 31 October 1953 in Tallinn) is an Estonian sailing coach.

In 1984 he graduated from the University of Tartu in physical education.

1966-1975 he become several times Estonian champion in different sailing disciplines.

Since 1972 he is working as a sailing coach. He has coached Soviet Union and Estonian sailing teams.

Students:

- Tõnu Tõniste, Toomas Tõniste, Krista Kruuv, Peter Šaraškin.

Awards:

- 1988 and 1992: Estonian Coach of the Year
- 2001: Order of the Estonian Red Cross, V class.
