= Sokk =

Family name

Sokk is an Estonian surname. Notable people with the surname include:

- Rein Sokk (born 1959), Estonian sport coach and track and field athlete
- Sten Sokk (born 1989), Estonian professional basketball point guard
- Tanel Sokk (born 1985), Estonian professional basketball point guard
- Tiit Sokk (born 1964), Estonian professional basketball point guard
