= Estonian Coach of the Year =

Estonian award

The Estonian Coach of the Year is chosen annually each December, since 1988. The winner is voted by a group of sports journalists, public, and sports associations. Skiing coach Mati Alaver has won the award a record five times.

== List of award winners ==
Year	Estonian Coach of the Year	
1988	Rein Ottoson	Sailing
1989	Mihkel Leppik	Rowing
1990	Mihkel Leppik (2)	Rowing
1991	Jaak Salumets	Basketball
1992	Rein Ottoson (2)	Sailing
1993	Jaak Salumets (2)	Basketball
1994	Tiit Tamm	Nordic combined
1995	Rein Sokk	Athletics
1996	Rein Sokk (2)	Athletics
1997	Rein Sokk (3)	Athletics
1998	Anatoli Šmigun	Skiing
1999	Mati Alaver	Skiing
2000	Aavo Põhjala	Judo
2001	Mati Alaver (2)	Skiing
2002	Mati Alaver (3)	Skiing
2003	Mati Alaver (4)	Skiing
2004	Igor Grinko	Rowing
2005	Heino Puuste	Javelin throw
2006	Anatoli Šmigun (2)	Skiing
2007	Vésteinn Hafsteinsson	Discus throw
2008	Vésteinn Hafsteinsson (2)	Discus throw
2009	Mati Alaver (5)	Skiing
2010	Avo Keel	Volleyball
2011	Tarmo Rüütli	Association football
2012	Henn Põlluste	Wrestling
2013	Henn Põlluste (2)	Wrestling
2014	Anne Mägi/Taivo Mägi	Athletics
2015	Alar Seim	Weightlifting
2016	Matti Killing	Rowing
2017	Gheorghe Creţu	Volleyball
2018	Gheorghe Creţu (2)	Volleyball
2019	Indrek Tustit/Marek Vister	Athletics
2021	Kaido Kaabermaa	Fencing
2022	Gerd Kanter	Discus throw
2023	Henry Hein	Swimming
2024	Henry Hein (2)	Swimming

== See also ==
- Estonian Athlete of the Year
- Estonian Young Athlete of the Year
- Estonian Sports Team of the Year
