= Rutt Šmigun =

Estonian cross-country skier

Rutt Šmigun (until 1975 Rehemaa; born 4 May 1954) is an Estonian cross-country skier.

She was born in Tartu.

She began her skiing career in 1961, coached by Agnes Nopasson, and later Herbert Abel. He won two silver medal at World Junior Championships in 5 km, and in relay. She is multiple-times Estonian champion in different skiing disciplines.

In 2010 she was named Mother of the Year by Estonian Women's Association.

Her husband is Anatoli Šmigun. Their daughters are skiers Kristina Šmigun-Vähi and Katrin Šmigun.
