= Mati Alaver =

Estonian sport coach and skier (born 1954)

Mati Alaver (born 21 February 1954 in Võru) is a former Estonian skier and sport coach.

From 1981 to 1992, he was the main coach of the Estonian women's cross-country national team, and from 1992 to 2011, the main coach for Estonian cross-country skiing.

His most notable students are Andrus Veerpalu and Jaak Mae.

In 2019, he was involved in the Operation Aderlass doping scandal.

== Awards ==
- 1999, 2001–2003, and 2009: best coach of Estonia
- 2001: ~~Order of the Estonian Red Cross, IV class~~. In 2019, the award was withdrawn due to the doping scandal
- 2003: The International Olympic Committee's yearly award "Sporting Excellence"
- 2006: ~~Order of the White Star, III class~~. In 2019, the award was withdrawn due to the doping scandal
