= Kristina Šmigun-Vähi =

Estonian cross-country skier and politician

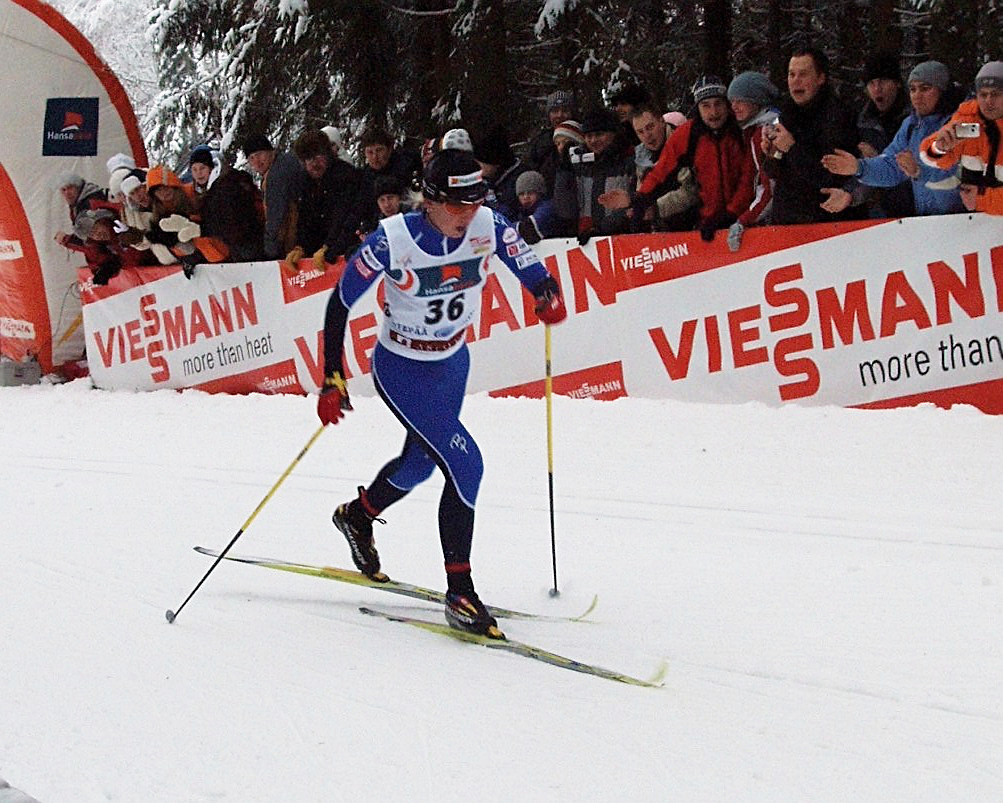
- Kristina Šmigun in Otepää in 2006

Personal information
- Born: 23 February 1977 (age 49) Tartu, then part of Estonian SSR, Soviet Union
- Height: 168 cm (5 ft 6 in)

Sport
- Sport: Skiing
- Club: Oti Sportclub

World Cup career
- Seasons: 16 – (1993–2007, 2010)
- Indiv. starts: 179
- Indiv. podiums: 50
- Indiv. wins: 16
- Team starts: 20
- Team podiums: 0
- Overall titles: 0 – (2nd in 2000 and 2003)
- Discipline titles: 2 – (1 LD, 1 MD)
Medal record
Women's cross-country skiing
Representing Estonia
International nordic ski competitions
Event	1st	2nd	3rd
Olympic Games	2	1	0
World Championships	1	3	2
Total	3	4	2
Olympic Games
Gold medal – first place	2006 Turin	10 km classical
Gold medal – first place	2006 Turin	15 km double pursuit
Silver medal – second place	2010 Vancouver	10 km freestyle
World Championships
Gold medal – first place	2003 Val di Fiemme	10 km double pursuit
Silver medal – second place	1999 Ramsau	15 km freestyle
Silver medal – second place	2003 Val di Fiemme	10 km classical
Silver medal – second place	2003 Val di Fiemme	15 km classical
Bronze medal – third place	1999 Ramsau	30 km classical
Bronze medal – third place	2003 Val di Fiemme	30 km freestyle
Junior World Championships
Gold medal – first place	1997 Canmore	5 km classical
Gold medal – first place	1997 Canmore	15 km freestyle
Silver medal – second place	1995 Gällivare	5 km classical
Silver medal – second place	1995 Gällivare	15 km freestyle
Silver medal – second place	1996 Asiago	5 km classical
Silver medal – second place	1996 Asiago	15 km freestyle
- Updated on 27 January 2019

Kristina Šmigun-Vähi (born 23 February 1977) is a former Estonian female cross-country skier and politician. She is the most successful Estonian female cross-country skier with two Olympic gold medals. Since 2019, Šmigun-Vähi, a member of the Reform Party, has served as a member of the Estonian Parliament.

== Cross-country skiing career ==
On 12 February 2006, she won the Winter Olympics gold medal for the 7.5 km + 7.5 km double pursuit, becoming the first Estonian woman to win a medal at the Winter Olympics. Four days later, she won a second gold medal in the 10 km classical.

On 15 February 2010, she won her third Olympic medal, a silver in the 10 km freestyle race. With two golds and one silver, Šmigun-Vähi is the most successful Estonian athlete in Olympic history (summer or winter), tying the record of men's cross-country skier Andrus Veerpalu.

Šmigun-Vähi has also found success at the FIS Nordic World Ski Championships, earning six medals. This included one gold (2003: 5 km + 5 km double pursuit), three silvers (1999: 15 km, 2003: 10 km, 15 km), and two bronzes (1999, 2003: both in 30 km).

On 2 July 2010, Šmigun-Vähi announced that she will quit her professional sport career to focus on her family and her daughter Victoria-Kris. On 24 October 2016, the World Anti-Doping Agency Athletes' Commission stated that Šmigun-Vähi faced a Court of Arbitration for Sport hearing before the end of October.

== Cross-country skiing results ==
All results are sourced from the International Ski Federation (FIS).

=== Olympic Games ===
- 3 medals – (2 gold, 1 silver)

Year	Age	5 km	10 km	15 km	Pursuit	30 km	Sprint	4 × 5 km relay	Team sprint
1994	17	30	—N/a	28	27	—	—N/a	12	—N/a
1998	21	—	—N/a	—	—	46	—N/a	—	—N/a
2002	25	—N/a	DNF	7	13	7	25	—	—N/a
2006	29	—N/a	Gold	—N/a	Gold	8	—	—	—
2010	33	—N/a	Silver	—N/a	DNF	27	—	—	—

=== World Championships ===
- 6 medals – (1 gold, 3 silver, 2 bronze)

Year	Age	5 km	10 km	15 km	Pursuit	30 km	Sprint	4 × 5 km relay	Team sprint
1993	16	35	—N/a	—	31	—	—N/a	—	—N/a
1995	18	5	—N/a	—	20	—	—N/a	11	—N/a
1997	20	28	—N/a	8	9	—	—N/a	—	—N/a
1999	22	9	—N/a	Silver	6	Bronze	—N/a	—	—N/a
2001	24	—N/a	12	41	—	CNX^{[a]}	19	—	—N/a
2003	26	—N/a	Silver	Silver	Gold	Bronze	—	—	—N/a
2005	28	—N/a	4	—N/a	DNF	14	—	13	—
2007	30	—N/a	9	—N/a	10	6	—	15	—

a. ^{1} Cancelled due to extremely cold weather.

=== World Cup ===
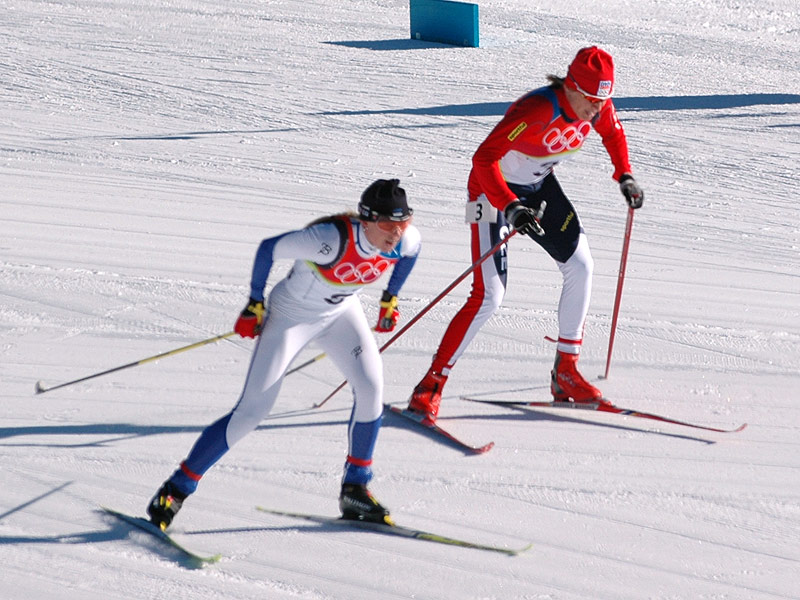
Kristina Šmigun and Kateřina Neumannová in 2006

==== Season titles ====
- 2 titles – (1 long distance, 1 middle distance)

Season
Season	Discipline
1999	Long Distance
2000	Middle Distance

==== Season standings ====
Season	Age	Discipline standings					Ski Tour standings	
Season	Age	Overall	Distance	Long Distance	Middle Distance	Sprint	Tour de Ski	World Cup Final
1993	16	NC	—N/a	—N/a	—N/a	—N/a	—N/a	—N/a
1994	17	60	—N/a	—N/a	—N/a	—N/a	—N/a	—N/a
1995	18	29	—N/a	—N/a	—N/a	—N/a	—N/a	—N/a
1996	19	17	—N/a	—N/a	—N/a	—N/a	—N/a	—N/a
1997	20	13	—N/a	21	—N/a	15	—N/a	—N/a
1998	21	19	—N/a	15	—N/a	27	—N/a	—N/a
1999	22	4	—N/a	1st place, gold medalist(s)	—N/a	3rd place, bronze medalist(s)	—N/a	—N/a
2000	23	2nd place, silver medalist(s)	—N/a	2nd place, silver medalist(s)	1st place, gold medalist(s)	3rd place, bronze medalist(s)	—N/a	—N/a
2001	24	10	—N/a	—N/a	—N/a	23	—N/a	—N/a
2002	25	4	—N/a	—N/a	—N/a	24	—N/a	—N/a
2003	26	2nd place, silver medalist(s)	—N/a	—N/a	—N/a	41	—N/a	—N/a
2004	27	5	3rd place, bronze medalist(s)	—N/a	—N/a	47	—N/a	—N/a
2005	28	4	3rd place, bronze medalist(s)	—N/a	—N/a	70	—N/a	—N/a
2006	29	17	11	—N/a	—N/a	38	—N/a	—N/a
2007	30	11	5	—N/a	—N/a	NC	DNF	—N/a
2010	33	32	22	—N/a	—N/a	84	—	6

==== Individual podiums ====
- 16 victories – (16 WC)
- 50 podiums – (49 WC, 1 SWC)

No.	Season	Date	Location	Race	Level	Place
1	1998–99	27 December 1998	Garmisch-Partenkirchen, Germany	1.0 km Sprint F	World Cup	2nd
2	1998–99	5 January 1999	Otepää, Estonia	10 km C Individual	World Cup	3rd
3	1998–99	12 January 1999	Nové Město, Czech Republic	15 km F Mass Start	World Cup	1st
4	1998–99	19 February 1999	Ramsau, Austria	15 km F Mass Start	World Championships^{[1]}	2nd
5	1998–99	27 February 1999	Ramsau, Austria	30 km C Mass Start	World Championships^{[1]}	3rd
6	1998–99	20 March 1999	Oslo, Norway	30 km F Mass Start	World Cup	3rd
7	1999–2000	5 December 1999	Kiruna, Sweden	5 km C Individual	World Cup	3rd
8	1999–2000	10 December 1999	Sappada, Italy	10 km F Individual	World Cup	1st
9	1999–2000	28 December 1999	Garmisch-Partenkirchen, Germany	1.5 km F Sprint	World Cup	1st
10	1999–2000	8 January 2000	Moscow, Russia	15 km F Mass Start	World Cup	2nd
11	1999–2000	12 January 2000	Nové Město, Czech Republic	15 km F Mass Start	World Cup	2nd
12	1999–2000	16 February 2000	Ulrichen, Switzerland	5 km C Individual	World Cup	1st
13	1999–2000	20 February 2000	Lamoura Mouthe, France	44 km F Mass Start	World Cup	2nd
14	1999–2000	3 March 2000	Lahti, Finland	1.2 km Sprint F	World Cup	1st
15	2000–01	29 November 2000	Beitostølen, Norway	5 km F Individual	World Cup	3rd
16	2000–01	20 December 2000	Davos, Switzerland	15 km C Mass Start	World Cup	3rd
17	2001–02	25 November 2001	Kuopio, Finland	5 km F Individual	World Cup	3rd
18	2001–02	12 December 2001	Brusson, Italy	10 km F Individual	World Cup	3rd
19	2001–02	15 December 2001	Davos, Switzerland	10 km C Individual	World Cup	2nd
20	2001–02	22 December 2001	Ramsau, Austria	15 km F Mass Start	World Cup	1st
21	2001–02	2 March 2002	Lahti, Finland	10 km F Individual	World Cup	1st
22	2001–02	16 March 2002	Oslo, Norway	30 km F Mass Start	World Cup	2nd
23	2002–03	23 November 2002	Kiruna, Sweden	5 km F Individual	World Cup	1st
24	2002–03	30 November 2002	Rukatunturi, Finland	10 km C Individual	World Cup	2nd
25	2002–03	7 December 2002	Davos, Switzerland	10 km F Individual	World Cup	2nd
26	2002–03	14 December 2002	Cogne, Italy	10 km C Mass Start	World Cup	2nd
27	2002–03	21 December 2002	Ramsau, Austria	5 km + 5 km C/F Pursuit	World Cup	3rd
28	2002–03	4 January 2003	Kavgolovo, Russia	5 km F Individual	World Cup	1st
29	2002–03	12 January 2003	Otepää, Estonia	15 km C Mass Start	World Cup	2nd
30	2002–03	18 January 2003	Nové Město, Czech Republic	10 km F Individual	World Cup	3rd
31	2003–04	22 November 2003	Beitostølen, Norway	10 km F Individual	World Cup	1st
32	2003–04	28 November 2003	Rukatunturi, Finland	10 km C Individual	World Cup	2nd
33	2003–04	29 November 2003	Rukatunturi, Finland	7.5 km + 7.5 km C/F Pursuit	World Cup	1st
34	2003–04	6 December 2003	Toblach, Italy	15 km F Mass Start	World Cup	1st
35	2003–04	20 December 2003	Ramsau, Austria	10 km F Individual	World Cup	3rd
36	2003–04	21 December 2003	Ramsau, Austria	7.5 km + 7.5 km C/F Pursuit	World Cup	1st
37	2003–04	6 January 2004	Falun, Sweden	7.5 km + 7.5 km C/F Pursuit	World Cup	3rd
38	2003–04	10 January 2004	Otepää, Estonia	15 km C Mass Start	World Cup	2nd
39	2004–05	20 November 2004	Gällivare, Sweden	10 km C Individual	World Cup	2nd
40	2004–05	26 November 2004	Rukatunturi, Finland	10 km F Individual	World Cup	2nd
41	2004–05	28 November 2004	Rukatunturi, Finland	10 km C Individual	World Cup	1st
42	2004–05	11 December 2004	Lago di Tesero, Italy	7.5 km + 7.5 km C/F Pursuit	World Cup	2nd
43	2004–05	18 December 2004	Ramsau, Austria	15 km F Mass Start	World Cup	1st
44	2005–06	27 November 2005	Rukatunturi, Finland	10 km F Individual	World Cup	3rd
45	2005–06	7 January 2006	Otepää, Estonia	10 km C Individual	World Cup	2nd
46	2006–07	18 November 2006	Gällivare, Sweden	10 km F Individual	World Cup	2nd
47	2006–07	26 November 2006	Rukatunturi, Finland	10 km C Individual	World Cup	3rd
48	2006–07	11 March 2007	Lahti, Finland	10 km C Individual	World Cup	1st
49	2009–10	12 December 2009	Davos, Switzerland	10 km F Individual	World Cup	3rd
50	2009–10	21 March 2010	Falun, Sweden	10 km F Pursuit	Stage World Cup	3rd

Note: ^{1} Until the 1999 World Championships, World Championship and Olympic races were included in the World Cup scoring system.

==== Overall record ====
Result	Distance Races^{[a]}						Sprint	Ski Tours	Individual Events	Team Events		All Events
Result	≤ 5 km^{[b]}	≤ 10 km^{[b]}	≤ 15 km^{[b]}	≤ 30 km^{[b]}	≥ 30 km^{[b]}	Pursuit^{[c]}	Sprint	Ski Tours	Individual Events	Team Sprint	Relay^{[d]}	All Events
1st place	3	5	4	–	–	2	2	–	16	–	–	16
2nd place	–	9	5	1	1	1	1	–	18	–	–	18
3rd place	3	8	1	2	–	2	–	–	16	–	–	16
Podiums	6	22	10	3	1	5	3	–	50	–	–	50
Top 10	16	46	18	7	1	13	8	1	110	–	12	122
Points	27	57	27	9	2	19	22	1	164	1	19	184
Others	2	2	–	–	–	1	4	–	9	–	–	9
DNF	–	–	–	–	–	–	–	1	1	–	–	1
Starts	29	59	27	9	2	20	26	2	174	1	19	194

a. ^{1} Classification is made according to FIS classification.
b. ^{1} ^{2} ^{3} ^{4} ^{5} Includes individual and mass start races.
c. ^{1} Includes pursuit and double pursuit races.
d. ^{1} May be incomplete due to lack of appropriate sources for some relay races prior to 1995/96 World Cup season.

Note: Until 1999 World Championships and 1994 Olympics, World Championship and Olympic races were part of the World Cup. Hence results from those races are included in the World Cup overall record.

== Political career ==
Šmigun-Vähi joined the liberal Reform Party in 2018.

Since 2019, she has been serving as a member of the Estonian Parliament.

== Personal life ==
She is the daughter of former cross-country skiers Rutt and Anatoli Šmigun. Her sister Katrin Šmigun and cousin Aivar Rehemaa were also cross-country skiers.

Šmigun-Vähi is married to her long-time manager Kristjan-Thor Vähi. She missed the 2007–08 and 2008–09 seasons due to pregnancy. She has two children, a daughter born in 2008 and a son born in 2011.

== See also ==
- List of multiple Olympic gold medalists at a single Games

Awards
Preceded by Erika Salumäe	Estonian Sportswoman of the Year; 1997	Succeeded by Jane Salumäe
Preceded by Jane Salumäe	Estonian Sportswoman of the Year; 1999 – 2000	Succeeded by Heidi Rohi
Preceded by Heidi Rohi	Estonian Sportswoman of the Year; 2002 – 2004	Succeeded by Maarika Võsu
Preceded by Maarika Võsu	Estonian Sportswoman of the Year; 2006	Succeeded by Irina Embrich
Preceded by Ksenija Balta	Estonian Sportswoman of the Year; 2010	Succeeded by Triin Aljand
