= Igor Trofymov =

Estonian sailor and coach

Igor Trofymov (until 1992 Karpak; born 4 August 1960) is an Estonian sailor and coach.

He was born in Pavlograd, Ukraine. In 1982, he graduated from Metallurgy Academy in Ukraine.

He started his sailing competitions in 1972. In 1981 he won bronze medal at Soviet Union Championships. In 1981 he placed 5th at Kiel Regatta.

Since 1998 he has been working as a sailing coach. Students: Deniss Karpak.

In 2004, 2007, 2009, 2011 and 2012, he was named Best Sailing Coach of Estonia.

== Personal ==
His wife is former swimmer Marina Trofimova and son is sailor Deniss Karpak.
