= Heidi Rohi =

Estonian fencer (born 1966)

Personal information
- Born: 23 May 1966 (age 60) Haapsalu, then part of Estonian SSR, Soviet Union

Sport
- Sport: Fencing
Medal record
Representing Estonia
Women's fencing
World Championships
| Silver medal – second place | 2002 Lisbon | Team epée |
| Bronze medal – third place | 1995 The Hague | Team epée |
European Championships
| Silver medal – second place | 2003 Bourges | Team épée |
| Bronze medal – third place | 2001 Koblenz | Epée |

Heidi Rohi (born 23 May 1966) is an Estonian fencer. She competed in the individual and team épée events at the 1996 Summer Olympics.

Awards and achievements
| Preceded by Kristina Šmigun | Estonian Sportswoman of the Year; 2001 | Succeeded by Kristina Šmigun |
