= Deniss Karpak =

Estonian sailor

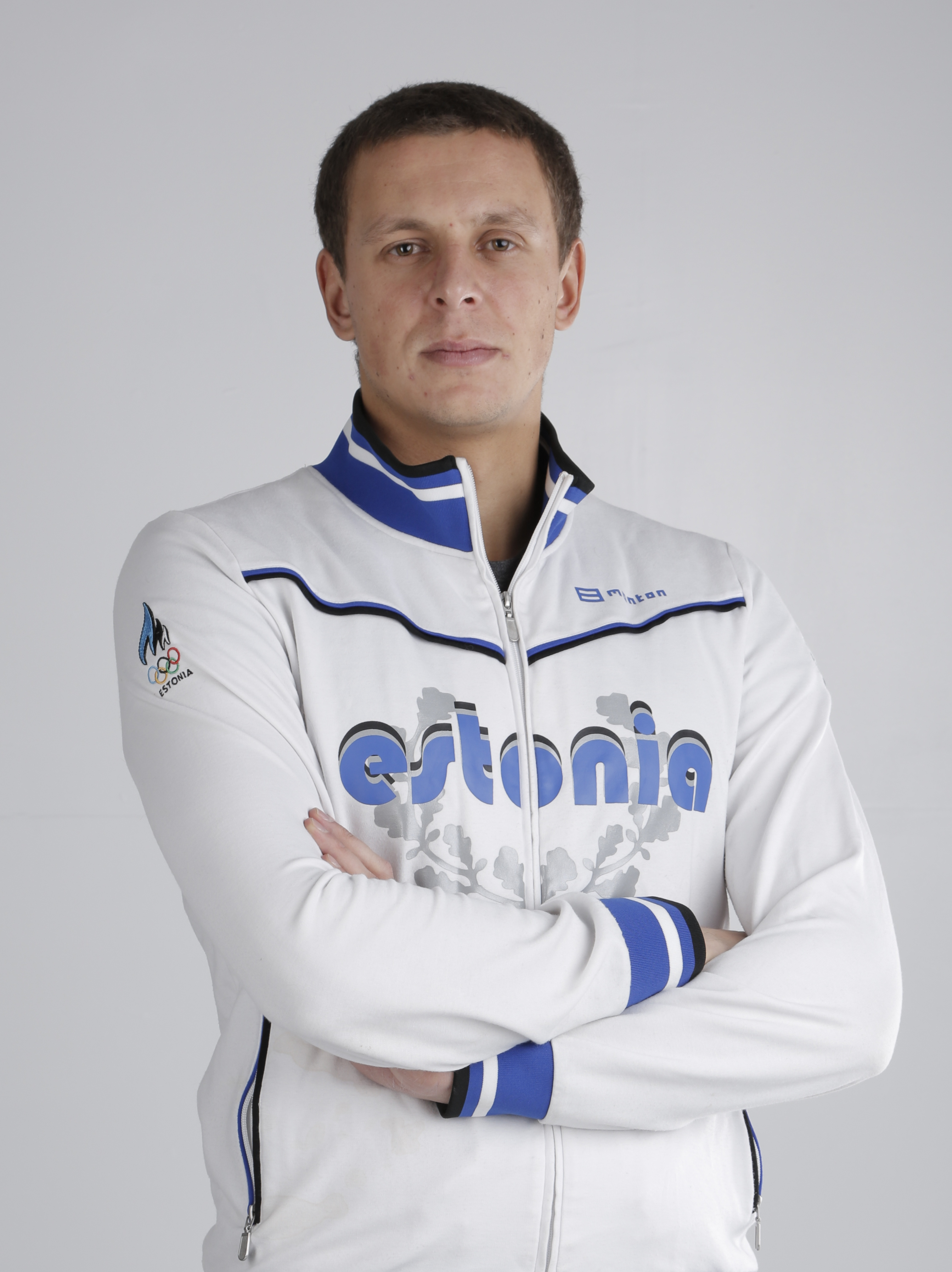
- Karpak in 2013

Personal information
- Born: 18 July 1986 (age 40) Tallinn, then part of Estonian SSR, Soviet Union
- Height: 200 cm (6 ft 7 in)
- Weight: 100 kg (220 lb)

Sailing career
- Sport: Sailing
- Classes: Optimist, Laser, Finn
Medal record
World Championships
Gold medal – first place	2025 Cascais	Finn
Bronze medal – third place	2007 Cascais	Laser
European Championships
Bronze medal – third place	2025 Naples	Finn

Deniss Karpak (born 18 July 1986) is an Estonian sailor.

Karpak was born in Tallinn. He finished 24th at the 2008 Summer Olympics in the Laser class. At the 2012 Summer Olympics he finished 11th in the Finn class and at the 2016 Summer Olympics he finished 20th.

== Biography ==
He was born to sailing athlete Igor Karpak and swimmer Marina Trofimova.

He began his high school education in Odesa, Ukraine. When his family moved back to Estonia, he continued his studies at Tallinna Läänemere Gümnaasium, graduating in 2004.

Karpak had his first sailing experience when he was six with an Optimist. He started to regularly engage in sailing when was 12 years old in 1998 with the sailing club "Baltsail". In 1999 Karpak moved to the sailing club Kalev Sailing School (KPSK). In 2003 he moved over to the Laser class. Since 2009 he has been sailing with the Finn class.

Awards
Preceded by Heiki Nabi	Estonian Young Sports Personality of the Year; 2007	Succeeded by Kaire Leibak
