= Anatoli Šmigun =

Estonian sport coach

Anatoli Šmigun (born on 5 December 1952 in Zlatoust, Chelyabinsk Oblast) is a cross-ski coach and former cross-skier.

He is the father of cross-skiers Kristina Šmigun and Katrin Šmigun.

1977-1982 he won 7 gold, 4 silver and 1 bronze medal in Estonian Skiing Championships.

1982-1986 he was All-Union coach of Dynamo Sports Club.

Awards:

- 1998: Estonian Coach of the Year
- 2006: Estonian Coach of the Year
- 2006: Order of the White Star, III class.
