= Estonian Athlete of the Year =

Estonian award

Athlete of the Year (Aasta Sportlane)
- Country: Estonia
- Presented by: Estonian Olympic Committee
- First award: 1931

Highlights
- Most wins: Erika Salumäe (9)
- Website: https://aastasportlane.eok.ee/

The Estonian Athlete of the Year (Estonian: Eesti Aasta Sportlane) is an annual award presented by the Estonian Olympic Committee (Eesti Olümpiakomitee, EOK) to one male and one female sportsperson judged to have delivered the best performance over the course of the year. The winners of the award, which was first conceived in the 1930s and has been presented every year since 1955, are chosen by an aggregated vote from sporting journalists, national sporting federations, and the public at large.

Initially an accolade presented to one individual, the award was split into male and female categories beginning in 1967. In 2020 the two categories were merged due to the disruption caused by the COVID-19 pandemic to the international and national sporting calendars. The athlete with the most wins is cyclist Erika Salumäe, who has won the award on nine occasions.

== List of award winners ==
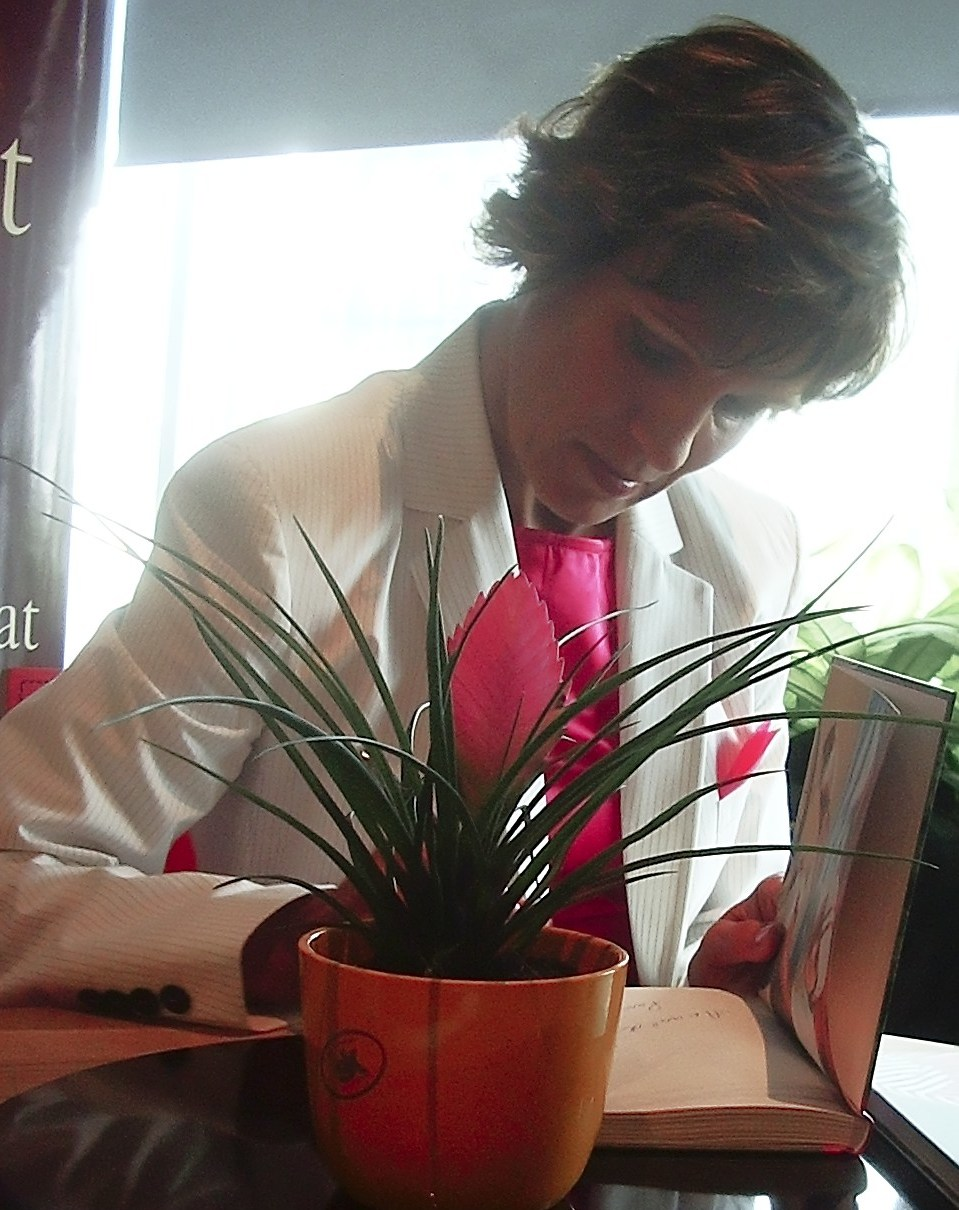
Cyclist Erika Salumäe (pictured in 2009) won Athlete of the Year a record nine times between 1983 and 1996

Cyclist Erika Salumäe has won Athlete of the Year more than any other athlete, male or female, with nine wins between 1983 and 1996. Skier Kristina Šmigun-Vähi is the second-most decorated winner, having been chosen as Female Athlete of the Year on eight occasions. Of male athletes, the most successful are weightlifter Jaan Talts, cyclist Aavo Pikkuus, and skier Andrus Veerpalu, each with five wins. Pikkuus holds the record for the most consecutive awards won, achieving his five successively between 1974 and 1978.

The youngest ever Athlete of the Year recipient is swimmer Kaire Indrikson who won in 1977 at the age of sixteen, while Aavo Pikkuus is the youngest male winner on record, achieving the first of his five wins in 1974 at the age of twenty. With a combined age of 39 years at the time of the 1977 awards, Indrikson and Pikkuus additionally constitute the youngest pair of winners from a single year. Chess player Paul Keres is the oldest person to be recognised as Athlete of the Year, winning his third award in 1962 at the age of 46. The oldest woman to win is fencer Heidi Rohi, who in 2001 was awarded Athlete of the Year at the age of 35. Keres also holds the record for the longest span of time over his awards, his third in 1962 coming 26 years after his first award in 1937. In awards presented solely after the Second World War, this distinction is held among male athletes by rower Jüri Jaanson, who won the award three times over fifteen years (1990–2004), and among female athletes by Erika Salumäe and Kristina Šmigun-Vähi, who each won their awards over fourteen-year periods (1983–1996 and 1997–2010 respectively).

Three members of the same family have each won Athlete of the Year: Ulvi Voog-Indrikson in 1957, her daughter Kaire Indrikson in 1977, and her granddaughter Triin Aljand in 2011 and 2012.

=== By year ===
==== Single award (1955–1966; 2020) ====
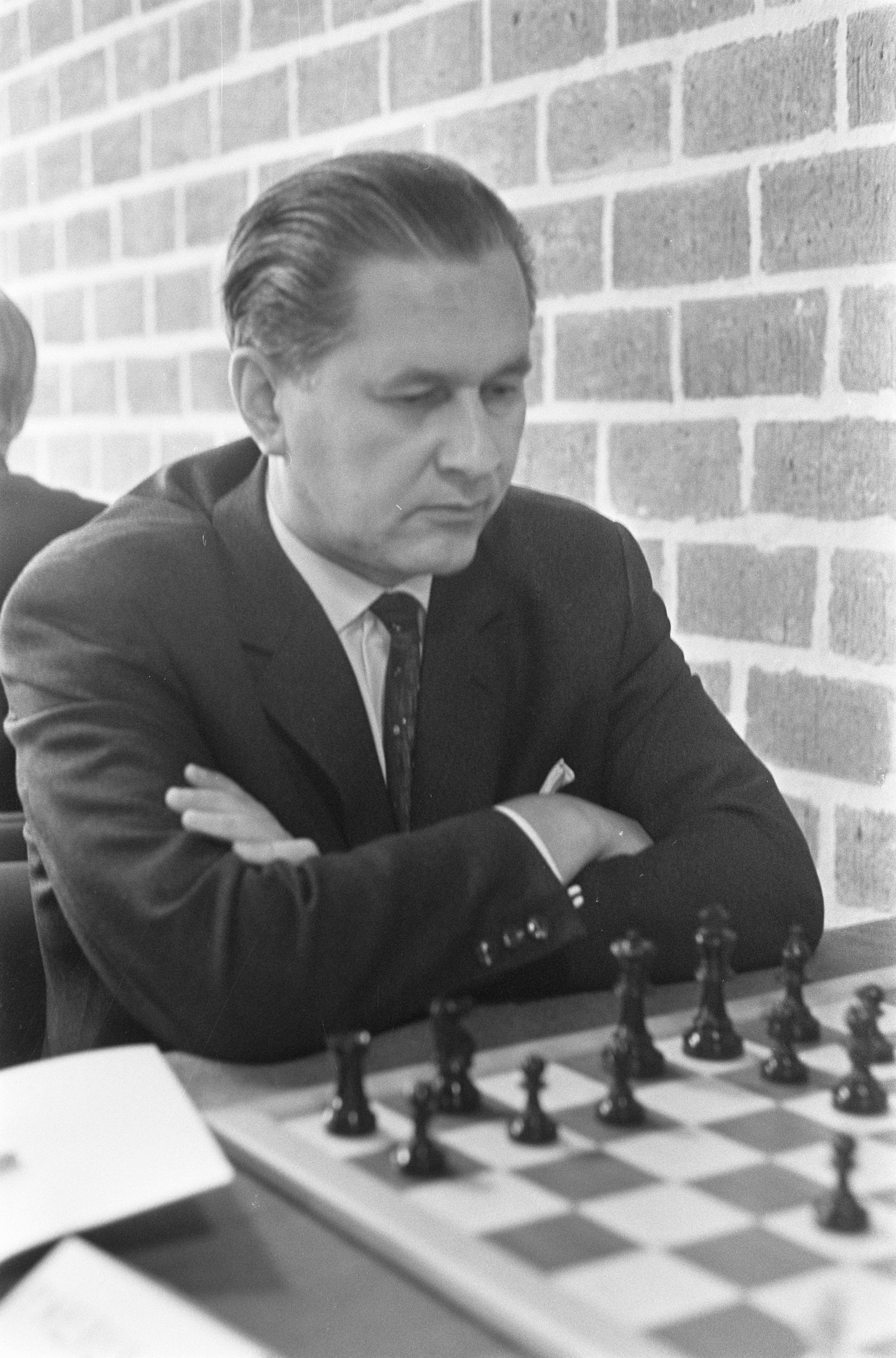
Chess player Paul Keres (pictured in 1969) was awarded Athlete of the Year twice, in 1959 and 1962, following his pre-war win in 1937

Year	Athlete of the Year		Ref.
Year	Athlete	Sport	Ref.
1955	Feliks Pirts	Shot put	
1956	Uno Palu	Decathlon	
1957	Ulvi Voog-Indrikson	Swimming	
1958	Uno Palu (2)	Decathlon	
1959	Paul Keres	Chess	
1960	Hanno Selg	Modern pentathlon	
1961	Toomas Leius	Tennis	
1962	Paul Keres (2)	Chess	
1963	Toomas Leius (2)	Tennis	
1964	Ants Antson	Speed skating	
1965	Toomas Leius (3)	Tennis	
1966	Mart Vilt	Middle-distance running	
From 1967–2019 the award was split into male and female categories (see below)
2020	Ott Tänak (2) and Martin Järveoja	Rallying	

==== Split award (1967–2019; 2021– ) ====
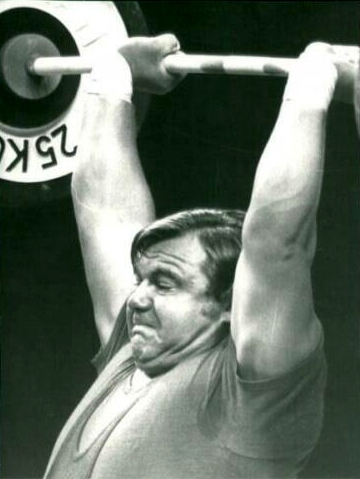
Weightlifter Jaan Talts (pictured in 1972) was a five-time Athlete of the Year winner between 1967 and 1972

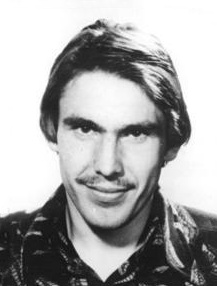
Cyclist Aavo Pikkuus (pictured in 1977) was named the men's Athlete of the Year five times consecutively from 1974 to 1978

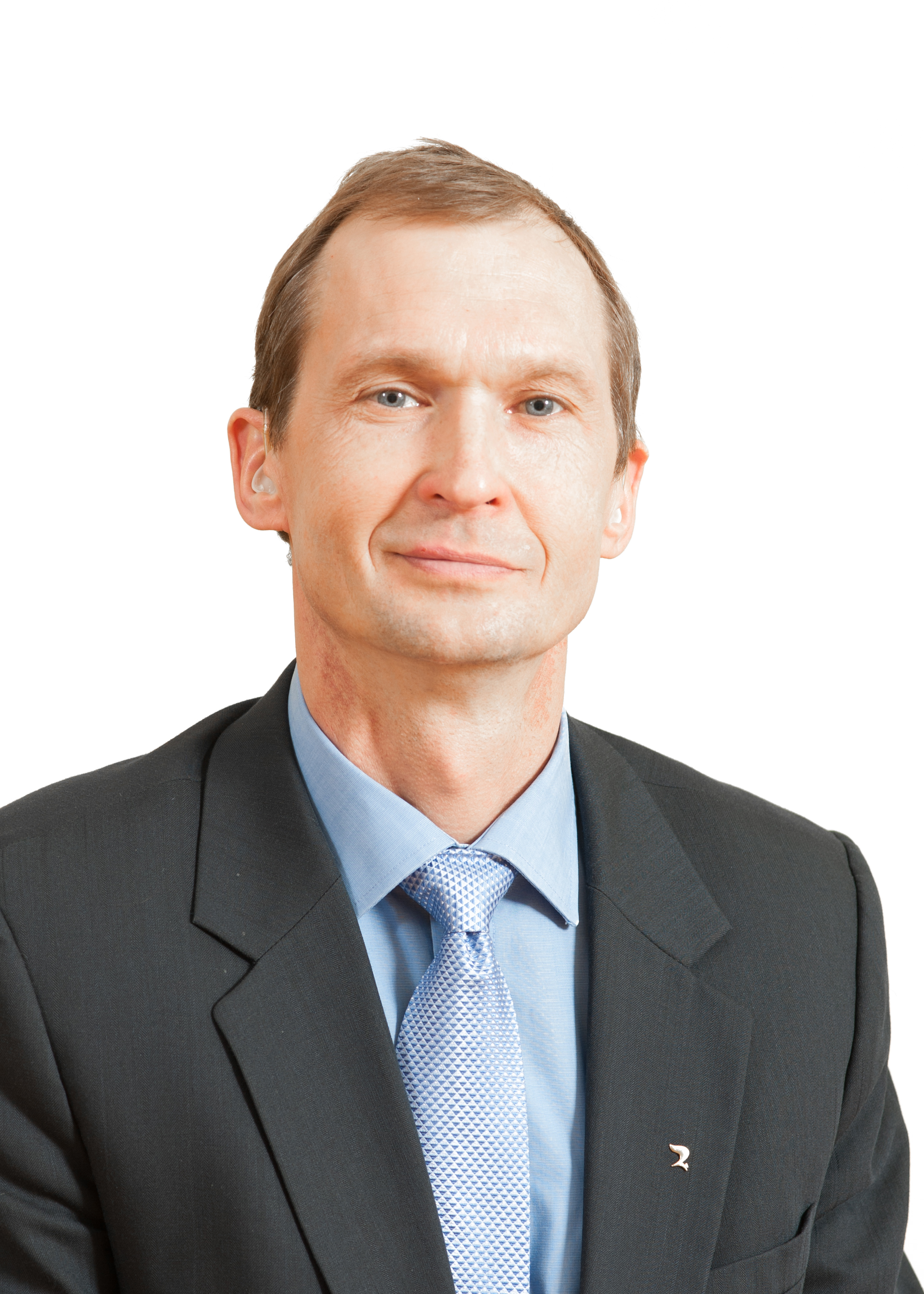
Rower Jüri Jaanson (pictured in 2015) was voted male Athlete of the Year three times between 1990 and 2004

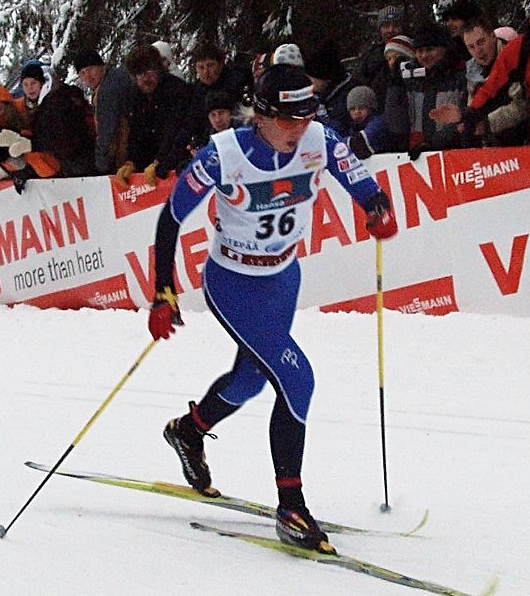
Cross-country skier Kristina Šmigun-Vähi (pictured in 2006) was named the women's Athlete of the Year eight times between 1997 and 2010

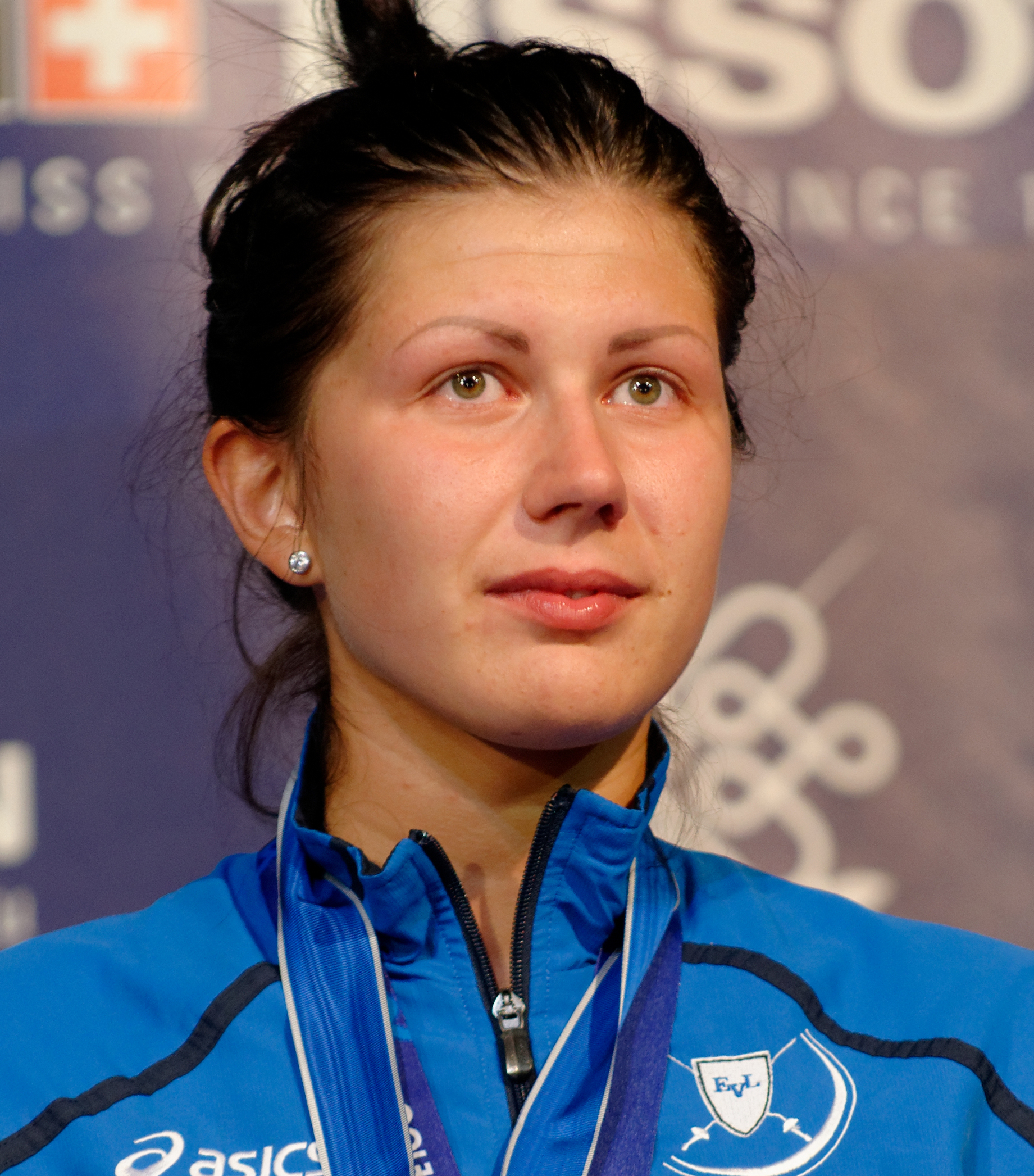
Fencer Julia Beljajeva (pictured in 2013) was selected as the female Athlete of the Year in 2013 and 2017

Year	Male		Female		Ref.
Year	Athlete	Sport	Athlete	Sport	Ref.
1967	Jaan Talts	Weightlifting	Laine Erik	Middle-distance running	
1968	Jaan Talts (2)	Weightlifting	Laine Erik (2)	Middle-distance running	
1969	Jaan Talts (3)	Weightlifting	Svetlana Tširkova	Fencing	
1970	Jaan Talts (4)	Weightlifting	Tiiu Parmas	Tennis	
1971	Vambola Helm	Motorcycle racing	Luule Tull	Motorcycle racing	
1972	Jaan Talts (5)	Weightlifting	Raissa Ruus	Middle-distance running	
1973	Ain Vilde	Ice yachting	Illa Raudik	Underwater orienteering	
1974	Aavo Pikkuus	Cycling	Endla Vellend	Archery	
1975	Aavo Pikkuus (2)	Cycling	Virve Holtsmeier	Archery	
1976	Aavo Pikkuus (3)	Cycling	Liivi Erm	Shooting	
1977	Aavo Pikkuus (4)	Cycling	Kaire Indrikson	Swimming	
1978	Aavo Pikkuus (5)	Cycling	Reet Palm	Rowing	
1979	Jaak Uudmäe	Triple jump	Reet Palm (2)	Rowing	
1980	Jaak Uudmäe (2)	Triple jump	Marina Trofimova	Swimming	
1981	Jüri Poljans	Sprint canoeing	Inna Rose	Shooting	
1982	Heino Puuste	Javelin throw	Inna Rose (2)	Shooting	
1983	Heino Puuste (2)	Javelin throw	Erika Salumäe	Cycling	
1984	Tiit Haagma	Ice yachting	Erika Salumäe (2)	Cycling	
1985	Riho Suun	Cycling	Kaija Parve-Helinurm	Biathlon	
1986	Heino Puuste (3)	Javelin throw	Kaija Parve-Helinurm (2)	Biathlon	
1987	Jaan Ehlvest	Chess	Erika Salumäe (3)	Cycling	
1988	Allar Levandi	Nordic combined	Erika Salumäe (4)	Cycling	
1989	Jaan Ehlvest (2)	Chess	Erika Salumäe (5)	Cycling	
1990	Jüri Jaanson	Rowing	Erika Salumäe (6)	Cycling	
1991	Tiit Sokk	Basketball	Kristiina Nurk	Finswimming	
1992	Kaido Kaaberma	Fencing	Erika Salumäe (7)	Cycling	
1993	Indrek Sei	Swimming	Oksana Jermakova	Fencing	
1994	Ago Markvardt	Nordic combined	Margrit Tooman	Modern pentathlon	
1995	Jüri Jaanson (2)	Rowing	Erika Salumäe (8)	Cycling	
1996	Erki Nool	Decathlon	Erika Salumäe (9)	Cycling	
1997	Erki Nool (2)	Decathlon	Kristina Šmigun	Skiing	
1998	Erki Nool (3)	Decathlon	Jane Salumäe	Long-distance running	
1999	Andrus Veerpalu	Skiing	Kristina Šmigun (2)	Skiing	
2000	Erki Nool (4)	Decathlon	Kristina Šmigun (3)	Skiing	
2001	Andrus Veerpalu (2)	Skiing	Heidi Rohi	Fencing	
2002	Andrus Veerpalu (3)	Skiing	Kristina Šmigun (4)	Skiing	
2003	Andrus Värnik	Javelin throw	Kristina Šmigun (5)	Skiing	
2004	Jüri Jaanson (3)	Rowing	Kristina Šmigun (6)	Skiing	
2005	Andrus Värnik (2)	Javelin throw	Maarika Võsu	Fencing	
2006	Andrus Veerpalu (4)	Skiing	Kristina Šmigun (7)	Skiing	
2007	Gerd Kanter	Discus throw	Irina Embrich	Fencing	
2008	Gerd Kanter (2)	Discus throw	Kaia Kanepi	Tennis	
2009	Andrus Veerpalu (5)	Skiing	Ksenija Balta	Long jump	
2010	Nikolai Novosjolov	Fencing	Kristina Šmigun-Vähi (8)	Skiing	
2011	Gerd Kanter (3)	Discus throw	Triin Aljand	Swimming	
2012	Heiki Nabi	Wrestling	Triin Aljand (2)	Swimming	
2013	Nikolai Novosjolov (2)	Fencing	Julia Beljajeva	Fencing	
2014	Rasmus Mägi	Hurdling	Erika Kirpu	Fencing	
2015	Mart Seim	Weightlifting	Epp Mäe	Wrestling	
2016	Rasmus Mägi (2)	Hurdling	Ksenija Balta (2)	Long jump	
2017	Ott Tänak	Rallying	Julia Beljajeva (2)	Fencing	
2018	Magnus Kirt	Javelin throw	Saskia Alusalu	Speed skating	
2019	Magnus Kirt (2)	Javelin throw	Kelly Sildaru	Freestyle skiing	
2021	Rasmus Mägi (3)	Hurdling	Katrina Lehis	Fencing	
2022	Janek Õiglane	Decathlon	Kelly Sildaru (2)	Freestyle skiing	
2023	Karel Tilga	Decathlon	Eneli Jefimova	Swimming	
2024	Johannes Erm	Decathlon	Eneli Jefimova (2)	Swimming	
2025	Johannes Erm	Decathlon	Eneli Jefimova (3)	Swimming	

=== By number of wins ===
The tables below list the individuals who have won Athlete of the Year more than once.

Key
†	Indicates awards won before separate male and female categories

Athlete of the Year winners (male)
Athlete	Sport	No.	Years won
Jaan Talts	Weightlifting	5	1967, 1968, 1969, 1970, 1972
Aavo Pikkuus	Cycling	5	1974, 1975, 1976, 1977, 1978
Andrus Veerpalu	Skiing	5	1999, 2001, 2002, 2006, 2009
Erki Nool	Decathlon	4	1996, 1997, 1998, 2000
Toomas Leius†	Tennis	3	1961, 1963, 1965
Heino Puuste	Javelin throw	3	1982, 1983, 1986
Jüri Jaanson	Rowing	3	1990, 1995, 2004
Gerd Kanter	Discus throw	3	2007, 2008, 2011
Rasmus Mägi	Hurdling	3	2014, 2016, 2021
Uno Palu†	Decathlon	2	1956, 1958
Paul Keres†	Chess	2	1959, 1962
Jaak Uudmäe	Triple jump	2	1979, 1980
Jaan Ehlvest	Chess	2	1987, 1989
Andrus Värnik	Javelin throw	2	2003, 2005
Nikolai Novosjolov	Fencing	2	2010, 2013
Magnus Kirt	Javelin throw	2	2018, 2019
Ott Tänak	Rallying	2	2017, 2020 (Note: Due to the COVID-19 pandemic, the male and female awards were merged for 2020.) (Note: Shared with Martin Järveoja.)
Johannes Erm	Decathlon	2	2024, 2025

Athlete of the Year winners (female)
Athlete	Sport	No.	Years won
Erika Salumäe	Cycling	9	1983, 1984, 1987, 1988, 1989, 1990, 1992, 1995, 1996
Kristina Šmigun-Vähi	Skiing	8	1997, 1999, 2000, 2002, 2003, 2004, 2006, 2010
Eneli Jefimova	Swimming	3	2023, 2024, 2025
Laine Erik	Middle-distance running	2	1967, 1968
Reet Palm	Rowing	2	1978, 1979
Inna Rose	Shooting	2	1981, 1982
Kaija Parve-Helinurm	Biathlon	2	1985, 1986
Triin Aljand	Swimming	2	2011, 2012
Ksenija Balta	Long jump	2	2009, 2016
Julia Beljajeva	Fencing	2	2013, 2017
Kelly Sildaru	Freestyle skiing	2	2019, 2022

== See also ==
- Estonian Young Athlete of the Year
- Estonian Coach of the Year
- Estonian Sports Team of the Year
