= Alar Seim =

Estonian weightlifter and coach

Alar Seim (born 22 July 1958 in Tallinn) is an Estonian weightlifter and coach.

In 1985 he graduated from Tartu State University in physical education.

1978-1989 he become 10-times Estonian champion in different weight categories.

Since 1982 he worked as a wrestling coach.

Students: Mart Seim.

Awards:

- 2015: Estonian Coach of the Year
