= Endla Vellend =

Estonian archer (born 1945)

Endla Vellend (since 1975 Lipre; born 30 December 1945, in Tallinn) is an Estonian archer.

In 1968 she graduated from Tallinn Polytechnical Institute's Department of Chemistry.

From 1972 to 1974 she was a member of Soviet Union team.

From 1965 to 1973 she became the eleven-time Estonian champion in different arching disciplines.

In 1974 she was named to Estonian Athlete of the Year.
