= Igor Grinko =

Russian rowing coach

Igor Grinko (17 February 1946 – 17 March 2014) was a Russian rowing coach.

Students: Jüri Jaanson.

Awards:

- 2004: Estonian Coach of the Year
