= Marina Trofimova =

Estonian swimmer

Personal information
- Born: February 16, 1964 (age 62) Tallinn, then part of Estonian SSR, Soviet Union
- Education: University of Tartu

Sport
- Sport: Swimming

Marina Trofimova (1981-1986 Karpak; born 16 February 1964) is an Estonian butterfly, freestyle and medley swimmer.

In 1985 she graduated from the Tartu State University in physical education.

From 1981 to 1985 she became 15-times Estonian champion in different disciplines at summer championships, and from 1983 to 1985 10-times at winter championships.

From 1978 to 1985 she was a member of Estonian national swimming team.

In 1980 she was named to Estonian Athlete of the Year.

== Personal ==
Her husband is Igor Trofymov and son is Deniss Karpak.
