= Indriksons =

Indriksons/Indriksone is a Latvian surname, the Latvianized form of Indrikson.

- Arnolds Indriksons (1893 – 1941), Latvian middle-distance runner
- Baiba Indriksone (born 1932), Latvian actress
- Ilze Indriksone (born 1974), Latvian environmental planner and politician
