= Felix Pirts =

Estonian track and field athlete

Felix Pirts (or Feliks Pirts; 9 November 1930 Kabala Parish, Viljandi County – 20 January 2002 Tartu) was an Estonian track and field athlete (shot putter).

In 1955 he graduated from Estonian Agricultural Academy, with a degree in agronomy.

In 1954 and 1957 he became the Estonian champion in shot put. His personal best was 17.01.

In 1955 he was named to Estonian Athlete of the Year.
