= Vambola Helm =

Estonian motorcycle racer and coach (1934–2020)

Vambola Helm (2 May 1934 in Rakvere – 29 February 2020 in Tallinn) was an Estonian motorcycle racer and coach.

From 1958 to 1973, Helm became a 15-time Estonian champion in different motorsport disciplines.

In 1971, Helm was named to Estonian Athlete of the Year.

Students: Rene Aas, Meelis Helm and Vahur Helm.
