= Henn Põlluste =

Estonian wrestler and coach

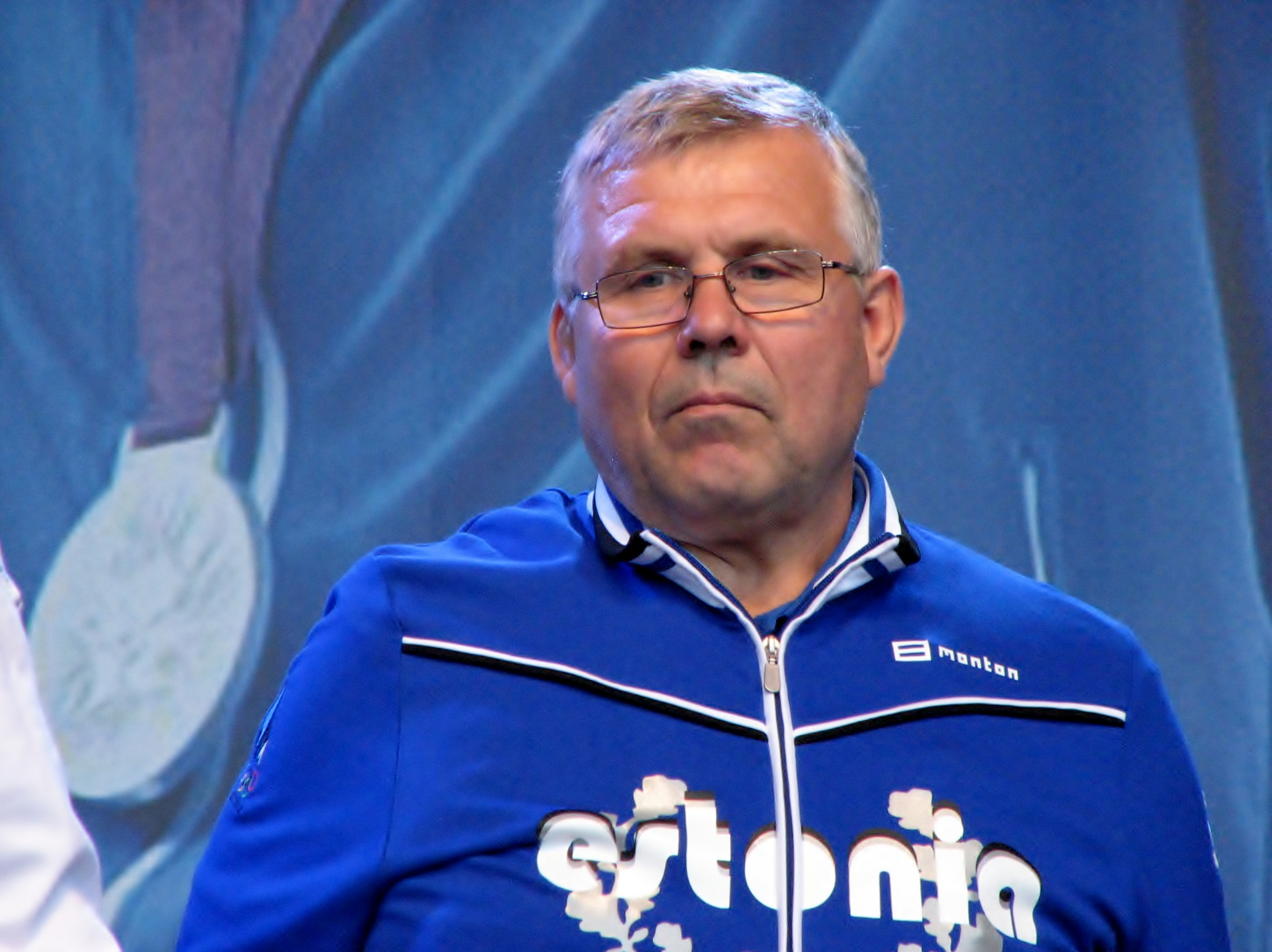
Henn Põlluste

Henn Põlluste (born on 2 September 1952 in Virtsu) is an Estonian wrestler and wrestling coach.

In 1980 he graduated from Tallinn Pedagogical Institute in physical education.

In 1972 he won Ivan Poddubny international competition.

1973-1979 he won several gold medals at Estonian Wrestling Championships.

1979–1990, 2002–2008 and 2010–2016, he was the principal coach of Estonian national wrestling team.

Students: Marko Yli-Hannuksela, Juha Ahokas, Valeri Nikitin, Tarvi Thomberg, Heiki Nabi, Ardo Arusaar.

Awards:

- 2012 and 2013: Estonian Coach of the Year
- 2013: Order of the White Star, III class.
