= Ain Vilde =

Estonian ice yachter and sailor (born 1942)

Ain Vilde (born 11 September 1942 in Sadala Parish, Tartu County) is an Estonian ice yachter and sailor.

In 1973 he won World Ice Yachting Championships (DN-class).

1962-1990 he won many medals at Estonian Ice Yachting and Estonian Sailing Championships.

In 1973 he was named to Estonian Athlete of the Year.
