= Rein Sokk =

Estonian sport coach and pole vaulter

Rein Sokk (born 25 March 1959 in Tallinn) is an Estonian sport coach and former pole vaulter.

1977-1986 he become 3-times Estonian champion in pole vault. In 1983 he set the new Estonian pole vault record: 5.32.

1993-1998 he coached Erki Nool.

Awards:

- 1995, 1996 and 1997: Estonian Coach of the Year
