= Liivi Erm =

Estonian sport shooter and coach

Liivi Erm (born 28 November 1953 in Raikküla Selsoviet, Rapla District) is an Estonian sport shooter and coach.

In 1977 she graduated from Estonian Agricultural Academy in land managing speciality (Estonian: maakorraldusinsener).

1976 she was a member of Soviet Union team. 1973-1983 and 2002, she was a member of Estonian national team.

1973-1985 he become 18-times Estonian champion in different shooting disciplines.

In 1976 he was named Estonian Athlete of the Year.
