= Mart Vilt =

Estonian middle-distance runner (1935–2021)

Mart Vilt (also Märt Vilt; 2 March 1935 Illuka Parish, Virumaa – 25 January 2021) was an Estonian track and field athlete (middle-distance runner).

1958–1969 he became 9-times Estonian champion in different running disciplines.

Personal bests: 800 m: 1.50.2 (1967), and 1000 m: 2.22.4 (1966).

In 1966 he was named Estonian Athlete of the Year.
