= Virve Laev =

Estonian film editor

Virve Laev (née Murre; born 1928) is an Estonian film editor best known for her work in film documentary drama in the 1970s.

She entered film in 1969 working on the adventure picture Viimne reliikvia with director Grigori Kromanov.

== Filmography ==
- 1963 "Jalgrattataltsutajad"
- 1967 "Viini postmark"
- 1969 "Viimne reliikvia"
- 1970 "Metskapten"
- 1973 "Tavatu lugu"
- 1974 ""Ooperiball"
- 1975 "Briljandid proletariaadi diktatuurile"
- 1976 "Aeg elada, aeg armastada"
- 1977 "Karikakramäng"
