= Reet Palm =

Estonian rower

Reet Palm (since 2014 Palm-Killing; born on 14 September 1959 in Tartu) is an Estonian rower and coach.

In 1978 she won bronze medal at World Rowing Championships.

Between 1975 and 2007, she became an 18-times Estonian champion in different rowing disciplines.

Since 1991 she has been working as a rowing coach. One of the rowers trained by her is Allar Raja. Her spouse is the rowing coach Matti Killing.

== Awards ==
- 1978 and 1979: Estonian Athlete of the Year.
