= Ulvi Voog =

Estonian swimmer

Personal information
- Born: 18 February 1937 (age 89) Tallinn, Estonia
- Height: 1.66 m (5 ft 5 in)
- Weight: 62 kg (137 lb)

Sport
- Sport: Swimming
- Club: Dünamo Tallinn
Medal record
Women's swimming
Representing the Soviet Union
European Championships
| Silver medal – second place | 1958 Budapest | 4×100 m medley |

Ulvi Indrikson (née Voog; born 18 February 1937) is an Estonian former freestyle swimmer who won a silver medal in the 4×100 m medley relay at the 1958 European Aquatics Championships. She also competed at the 1960 Summer Olympics in the 100 m and 4×100 m freestyle and finished eighth in the 4×100 m relay. During her career she won 11 national (USSR) titles: in the 100 m freestyle (1955–58, 60), 400 m freestyle (1956–60) and 4×100 m freestyle (1958), and set 10 national records.

Voog graduated from the University of Tartu. She started training in swimming in 1952 and after retirement in 1967 worked as a swimming coach for Dünamo Tallinn (1967–92) and the Soviet swimming team (1977). Around 1960 she changed her name to Indrikson. She is a grandmother of Estonian swimmers Triin, Martti and Berit Aljand. In 1957 she was chosen as the Estonian Sportspersonality of the year.

Awards
| Preceded by Uno Palu | Estonian Sportspersonality of the Year; 1957 | Succeeded by Uno Palu |
