= Virve, Estonia =

Village in Estonia

Coordinates: 59°35′32″N 25°36′24″E

Virve
- Village
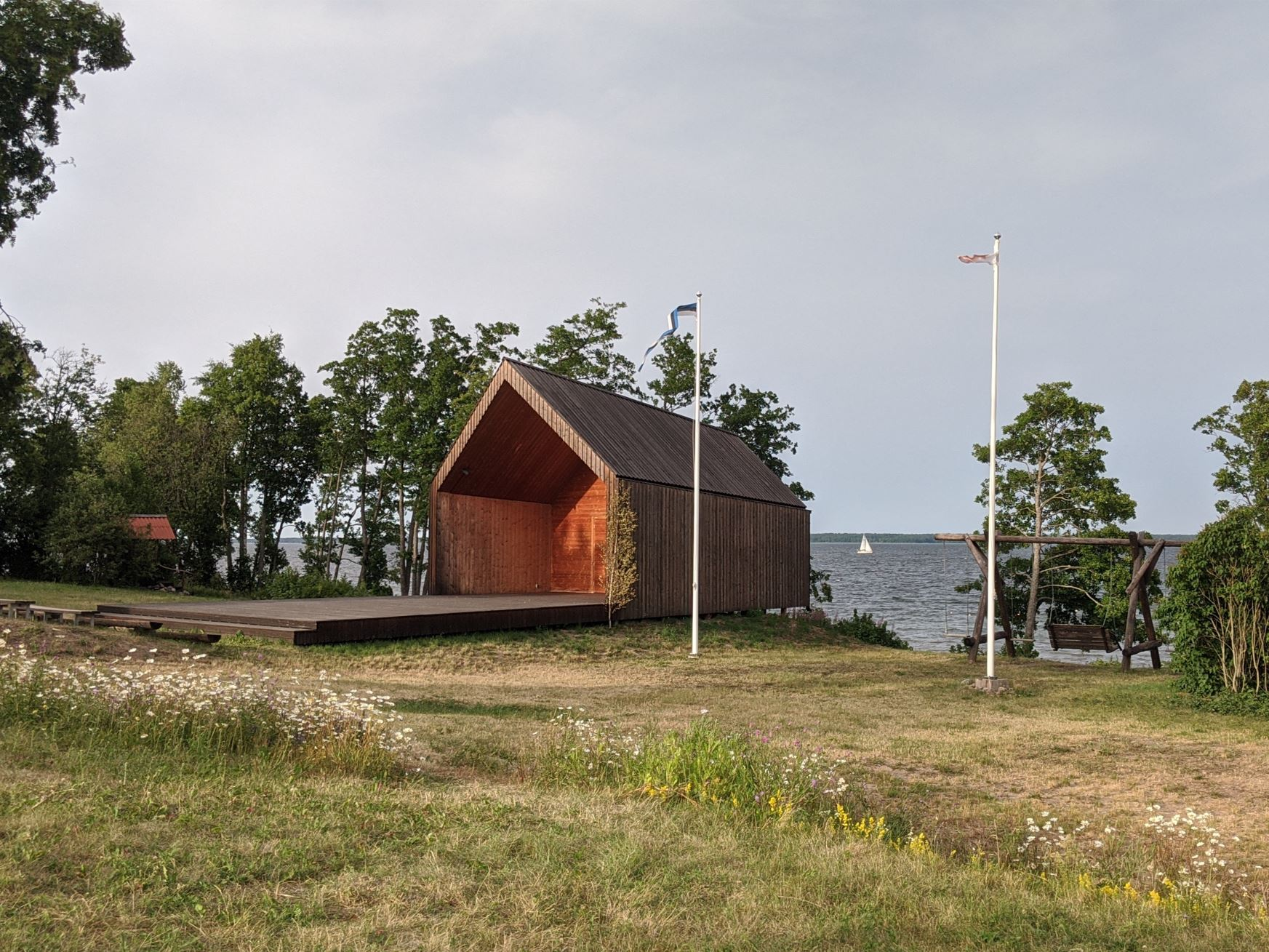
- Virve Song Festival grounds
- Interactive map of Virve
- Country: Estonia
- County: Harju County
- Parish: Kuusalu Parish
- Time zone: UTC+2 (EET)
  - Summer (DST): UTC+3 (EEST)

Virve is a village in Kuusalu Parish, Harju County in northern Estonia, on the territory of Lahemaa National Park. It is located on the Juminda Peninsula.
