= Virve Holtsmeier =

Estonian archer (born 1944)

Virve Holtsmeier (since 1985 Liiri; born 2 November 1944 in Suure-Jaani) is an Estonian archer.

In 1968 she graduated from Tallinn Polytechnical Institute's Department of Chemistry.

From 1969 to 1975 she was a member of Soviet Union team.

In 1971 she won silver and in 1975 gold medal at World Arching Championships.

From 1969 to 1976 she became the 13-time Estonian champion in different arching disciplines.

In 1975 she was named as Estonian Athlete of the Year.
