= Kristiina Nurk =

Estonian swimmer

Personal information
- Nationality: Estonian
- Born: July 8, 1972 (age 53) Kohtla-Järve, then part of Estonian SSR, Soviet Union

Sport
- Sport: Swimming
- Strokes: Finswimming
- Coach: Aleksander Abel
Medal record
Representing Estonia
World Games
Gold medal – first place	1993 The Hague	200m surface
Gold medal – first place	1993 The Hague	4x100m relay
Silver medal – second place	1993 The Hague	100m surface
Silver medal – second place	1993 The Hague	400m surface

Kristina Nurk (since 2018 Nurk-Baker; born on 8 July 1972) is an Estonian finswimmer.

1989 - Junior World Championship - she won two gold and two silver medals

1991 - European Champion

1992 and 1996 she won two bronze medals at World Championships.

1993 - she won silver medal at European Championship

1987-1999 she became individually 24-times Estonian champion in different underwater swimming disciplines.

In 1991 she was named to Estonian Athlete of the Year.

Since 2015 she is living in United Kingdom.
