= Margrit Tooman =

Estonian modern pentathlete

Margrit Tooman (since 1994 Kärp; born on 10 September 1971 in Pärnu) is an Estonian modern pentathlete.

In 1994, she graduated from Tallinn Pedagogical University in physical education.

In 1994 she achieved 5th place at World Modern Pentathlon Championships. 1989–1995 he become 6-times Estonian champion in modern pentathlon.

In 1994 she was named to Estonian Athlete of the Year.
