= Illa Raudik =

Estonian underwater swimmer

Personal information
- Born: January 10, 1944 (age 82) Vastseliina, Voru Parish, Estonia

Sport
- Sport: Swimming

Illa Raudik (born 10 January 1944 in Vastseliina) is an Estonian underwater swimmer.

In 1967, she graduated from Tallinn Pedagogical Institute in physical education.

In 1973, she won two gold medals at World Underwater Orienteering Championships.

From 1968 to 1975, she became a 25-time Estonian champion in different underwater sport disciplines.

In 1973, she was named to Estonian Athlete of the Year.
