= Katrin Šmigun =

Estonian cross-country skier (born 1979)

Personal information
- Nationality: Estonia
- Born: 21 October 1979 (age 46) Tartu, then part of Estonian SSR, Soviet Union

Sport
- Sport: Skiing

World Cup career
- Seasons: 10 – (1995–2003, 2005)
- Indiv. starts: 78
- Indiv. podiums: 0
- Team starts: 15
- Team podiums: 0
- Overall titles: 0 – (60th in 2007)
- Discipline titles: 0
Medal record
Women's cross-country skiing
Representing Estonia
Junior World Championships
Gold medal – first place	1998 Pontresina	5 km freestyle
Silver medal – second place	1997 Canmore	15 km freestyle
Silver medal – second place	1999 Saafelden	15 km freestyle
Bronze medal – third place	1998 Pontresina	15 km classical

Katrin Šmigun (born 21 October 1979) is an Estonian cross-country skier. She competed at the 1998 Winter Olympics and the 2002 Winter Olympics. Her sister is cross-country skier Kristina Šmigun-Vähi.

== Cross-country skiing results ==
All results are sourced from the International Ski Federation (FIS).

=== Olympic Games ===
Year	Age	5 km	10 km	15 km	Pursuit	30 km	Sprint	4 × 5 km relay
1998	18	20	—N/a	13	15	—	—N/a	—
2002	22	—N/a	42	23	—	13	—	—

=== World Championships ===
Year	Age	5 km	10 km	15 km	Pursuit	30 km	Sprint	4 × 5 km relay	Team sprint
1995	15	28	—N/a	—	39	—	—N/a	11	—N/a
1997	17	—	—N/a	66	45	DNF	—N/a	—	—N/a
1999	19	43	—N/a	10	16	19	—N/a	10	—N/a
2001	21	—N/a	—	39	50	CNX^{[a]}	—	—	—N/a
2005	25	—N/a	53	—N/a	—	DNF	—	13	—

a. ^{1} Cancelled due to extremely cold weather.

=== World Cup ===
==== Season standings ====
Season	Age					
Season	Age	Overall	Distance	Long Distance	Middle Distance	Sprint
1995	15	73	—N/a	—N/a	—N/a	—N/a
1996	16	NC	—N/a	—N/a	—N/a	—N/a
1997	17	48	—N/a	41	—N/a	46
1998	18	73	—N/a	47	—N/a	—
1999	19	24	—N/a	19	—N/a	28
2000	20	46	—N/a	33	33	NC
2001	21	92	—N/a	—N/a	—N/a	—
2002	22	87	—N/a	—N/a	—N/a	—
2003	23	69	—N/a	—N/a	—N/a	—
2005	25	NC	NC	—N/a	—N/a	—
