= Luule Tull =

Estonian motorcycle racer

Luule Tull (born 16 October 1942 in Eisma) is an Estonian motorcycle racer.

During her career, Tull became Estonian champion 42 times in different motorcycle racing disciplines. Between 1975 to 1992, she won the Kalev Great Race (Estonian: Kalevi suursõit) nine times.

In 1971, Tullwas named Estonian Athlete of the Year.
