= Order of the Estonian Red Cross =

Estonian state decoration

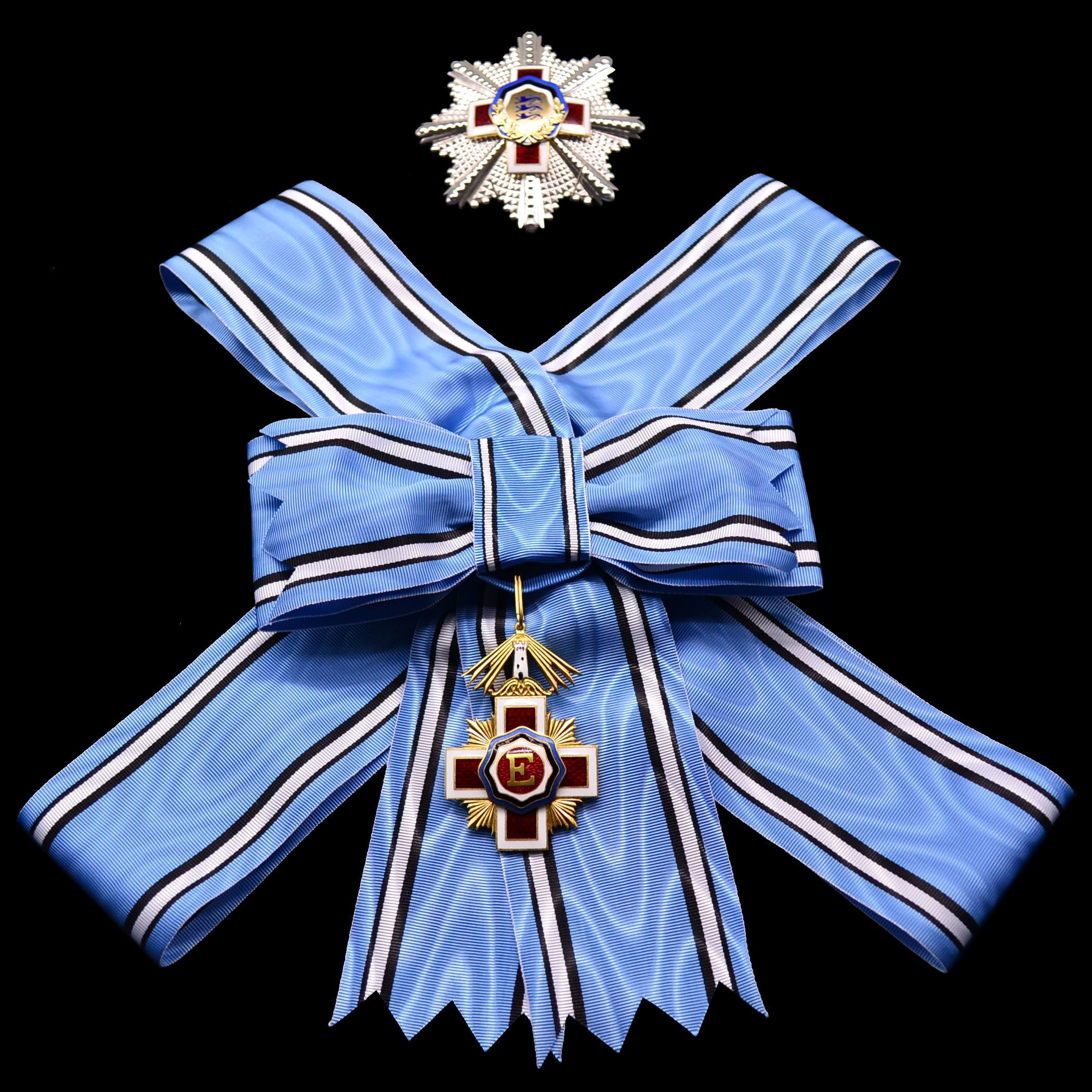
- Sash and star of the 1st class of the order for ladies
- Type: Six class order
- Awarded for: Humanitarian service and for saving life
- Country: Estonia
- Motto: Inter Arma Caritas
- Status: Currently awarded
- Established: 1920; 7 October 1936 as a state order
- 1st Class 2nd Class 3rd Class 4th Class 5th Class Medal Class Ribbon bars of the Order of the Estonian Red Cross

Precedence
- Next (higher): Order of the Cross of the Eagle
- Next (lower): Lowest

The Order of the Estonian Red Cross (Estonian: Eesti Punase Risti teenetemärk; French: Ordre de la Croix-Rouge Estonienne) was instituted in 1920 by the Estonian Red Cross Society. The Order of the Estonian Red Cross is bestowed in order to give recognition for humanitarian services rendered in the interests of the Estonian people and for the saving of life.

The order was banned during the Soviet occupation of Estonia but reinstated in 1994.

Among Estonian orders, the Order of the Estonian Red Cross is below the Order of the Cross of the Eagle and therefore the lowest-ranking. As with all other orders, this one is also bestowed by the President of Estonia.

== Classes ==
The Order of the Estonian Red Cross comprises six classes:

- Five basic classes – 1st, 2nd, 3rd, 4th and 5th class;
- One medal class.

The crosses of all basic classes of the Order of the Estonian Red Cross have the same design.

The blue colour tone of the moiré ribands belonging to the decorations of all the classes of the Order of the Estonian Red Cross is determined according to the international PANTONE colour-table as 297 MC.

== See also ==
- International Red Cross and Red Crescent Movement
