= 2022 World Wrestling Championships – Men's Greco-Roman 130 kg =

Wrestling competitions

Men's Greco-Roman 130 kg at the 2022 World Championships
- Venue: Štark Arena
- Dates: 12–13 September 2022
- Competitors: 25 from 25 nations

Medalists
gold medal	Rıza Kayaalp	Turkey
silver medal	Amin Mirzazadeh	Iran
bronze medal	Mantas Knystautas	Lithuania
bronze medal	Alin Alexuc-Ciurariu	Romania

The men's Greco-Roman 130 kilograms is a competition featured at the 2022 World Wrestling Championships, and was held in Belgrade, Serbia on 12 and 13 September 2022.

This Greco-Roman wrestling competition consists of a single-elimination tournament, with a repechage used to determine the winner of two bronze medals. The two finalists face off for gold and silver medals. Each wrestler who loses to one of the two finalists moves into the repechage, culminating in a pair of bronze medal matches featuring the semifinal losers each facing the remaining repechage opponent from their half of the bracket.

== Results ==
Legend

- F — Won by fall

=== Final ===
Final
Amin Mirzazadeh (IRI)	1
Rıza Kayaalp (TUR)	1

=== Top half ===
Round of 32
Jello Krahmer (GER)	5
Konsta Mäenpää (FIN)	7
Satish Antil (IND)	1
Sabah Shariati (AZE)	10
Alimkhan Syzdykov (KAZ)	0
Amin Mirzazadeh (IRI)	5
Cohlton Schultz (USA)	1
David Ovasapyan (ARM)	1
Dárius Vitek (HUN)	7^{F}
Kim Min-seok (KOR)	0

Round of 16
Iakobi Kajaia (GEO)	8
Konsta Mäenpää (FIN)	0
Sabah Shariati (AZE)	0
Amin Mirzazadeh (IRI)	9
Oskar Marvik (NOR)	5
Cohlton Schultz (USA)	0
Dárius Vitek (HUN)	1
Mantas Knystautas (LTU)	5

Quarterfinals
Iakobi Kajaia (GEO)	1
Amin Mirzazadeh (IRI)	1
Oskar Marvik (NOR)	1
Mantas Knystautas (LTU)	5

Semifinals
Amin Mirzazadeh (IRI)	2
Mantas Knystautas (LTU)	1

=== Bottom half ===
Round of 32
Rafał Krajewski (POL)	0
Danila Sotnikov (ITA)	5
Arata Sonoda (JPN)	0
Eduard Soghomonyan (BRA)	9^{F}
Abdellatif Mohamed (EGY)	2
Delian Alishahi (SUI)	0
Oleksandr Chernetskyi (UKR)	5
Meng Lingzhe (CHN)	0

Round of 16
Yasmani Acosta (CHI)	2
Danila Sotnikov (ITA)	4
Eduard Soghomonyan (BRA)	0
Muminjon Abdullaev (UZB)	8
Alin Alexuc-Ciurariu (ROU)	3
Abdellatif Mohamed (EGY)	1
Oleksandr Chernetskyi (UKR)	1
Rıza Kayaalp (TUR)	5

Quarterfinals
Danila Sotnikov (ITA)	2
Muminjon Abdullaev (UZB)	5
Alin Alexuc-Ciurariu (ROU)	0
Rıza Kayaalp (TUR)	8

Semifinals
Muminjon Abdullaev (UZB)	3
Rıza Kayaalp (TUR)	5

=== Repechage ===
Repechage round 1
Alimkhan Syzdykov (KAZ)	2
Sabah Shariati (AZE)	3

Repechage round 2
Sabah Shariati (AZE)	3
Iakobi Kajaia (GEO)	5
Oleksandr Chernetskyi (UKR)	3
Alin Alexuc-Ciurariu (ROU)	5

Bronze medals
Iakobi Kajaia (GEO)	1
Mantas Knystautas (LTU)	3
Alin Alexuc-Ciurariu (ROU)	5
Muminjon Abdullaev (UZB)	3

== Final standing ==
Rank	Athlete
1st place, gold medalist(s)	Rıza Kayaalp (TUR)
2nd place, silver medalist(s)	Amin Mirzazadeh (IRI)
3rd place, bronze medalist(s)	Mantas Knystautas (LTU)
3rd place, bronze medalist(s)	Alin Alexuc-Ciurariu (ROU)
5	Iakobi Kajaia (GEO)
5	Muminjon Abdullaev (UZB)
7	Sabah Shariati (AZE)
8	Danila Sotnikov (ITA)
9	Dárius Vitek (HUN)
10	Eduard Soghomonyan (BRA)
11	Oleksandr Chernetskyi (UKR)
12	Oskar Marvik (NOR)
13	Abdellatif Mohamed (EGY)
14	Konsta Mäenpää (FIN)
15	Cohlton Schultz (USA)
16	Jello Krahmer (GER)
17	Yasmani Acosta (CHI)
18	Alimkhan Syzdykov (KAZ)
19	David Ovasapyan (ARM)
20	Satish Antil (IND)
21	Delian Alishahi (SUI)
22	Rafał Krajewski (POL)
23	Meng Lingzhe (CHN)
24	Kim Min-seok (KOR)
25	Arata Sonoda (JPN)
