= 2023 World Wrestling Championships – Men's Greco-Roman 130 kg =

Wrestling competitions

Men's Greco-Roman 130 kg at the 2023 World Championships
- Venue: Štark Arena
- Dates: 21–22 September 2023
- Competitors: 30 from 27 nations

Medalists
gold medal	Amin Mirzazadeh	Iran
silver medal	Rıza Kayaalp	Turkey
bronze medal	Abdellatif Mohamed	Egypt
bronze medal	Óscar Pino	Cuba

The men's Greco-Roman 130 kilograms is a competition featured at the 2023 World Wrestling Championships, and was held in Belgrade, Serbia on 21 and 22 September 2023.

This Greco-Roman wrestling competition consists of a single-elimination tournament, with a repechage used to determine the winner of two bronze medals. The two finalists face off for gold and silver medals. Each wrestler who loses to one of the two finalists moves into the repechage, culminating in a pair of bronze medal matches featuring the semifinal losers each facing the remaining repechage opponent from their half of the bracket.

== Results ==
Legend

- F — Won by fall
- WO — Won by walkover

=== Final ===
Final
Rıza Kayaalp (TUR)	2
Amin Mirzazadeh (IRI)	2

=== Top half ===
Round of 32
Paul Morales (MEX)	0
Abdellatif Mohamed (EGY)	8
Heiki Nabi (EST)	1
Vitaly Shchur (AIN)	1
Yasmani Acosta (CHI)	0
Oskar Marvik (NOR)	2
Meng Lingzhe (CHN)	3
Jello Krahmer (GER)	1
Aýbegşazada Kürräýew (TKM)	0
Ilya Yudchyts (AIN)	2
Elias Kuosmanen (FIN)	4
Boris Petrušić (SRB)	0
Beka Kandelaki (AZE)	1
Iakobi Kajaia (GEO)	1

Round of 16
Rıza Kayaalp (TUR)	7
Abdellatif Mohamed (EGY)	2
Heiki Nabi (EST)	1
Oskar Marvik (NOR)	1
Meng Lingzhe (CHN)	4
Ilya Yudchyts (AIN)	1
Elias Kuosmanen (FIN)	1
Iakobi Kajaia (GEO)	1

Quarterfinals
Rıza Kayaalp (TUR)	9
Heiki Nabi (EST)	0
Meng Lingzhe (CHN)	3
Iakobi Kajaia (GEO)	1

Semifinals
Rıza Kayaalp (TUR)	3
Meng Lingzhe (CHN)	1

=== Bottom half ===
Round of 32
Amin Mirzazadeh (IRI)	9
Eduard Soghomonyan (BRA)	0
Mykhailo Vyshnyvetskyi (UKR)	5
Sota Okumura (JPN)	1
Cohlton Schultz (USA)	9^{F}
Marcel Albini (CZE)	1
Romas Fridrikas (LTU)	2
Dárius Vitek (HUN)	1
Óscar Pino (CUB)	WO
Daniel Gastl (AUT)
Mehar Singh (UWW)	0
David Ovasapyan (ARM)	8
Lee Seung-chan (KOR)	5
Temurbek Nasimov (UZB)	3

Round of 16
Amin Mirzazadeh (IRI)	2
Mykhailo Vyshnyvetskyi (UKR)	1
Cohlton Schultz (USA)	0
Romas Fridrikas (LTU)	4^{F}
Óscar Pino (CUB)	4
David Ovasapyan (ARM)	1
Lee Seung-chan (KOR)	1
Alin Alexuc-Ciurariu (ROU)	1

Quarterfinals
Amin Mirzazadeh (IRI)	1
Romas Fridrikas (LTU)	1
Óscar Pino (CUB)	9
Alin Alexuc-Ciurariu (ROU)	0

Semifinals
Amin Mirzazadeh (IRI)	1
Óscar Pino (CUB)	1

=== Repechage ===
Repechage round 1
Eduard Soghomonyan (BRA)	6
Mykhailo Vyshnyvetskyi (UKR)	9

Repechage round 2
Abdellatif Mohamed (EGY)	2
Heiki Nabi (EST)	0
Mykhailo Vyshnyvetskyi (UKR)	0
Romas Fridrikas (LTU)	8^{F}

Bronze medals
Abdellatif Mohamed (EGY)	3
Meng Lingzhe (CHN)	2
Romas Fridrikas (LTU)	1
Óscar Pino (CUB)	5

Olympic wrestle-off
Meng Lingzhe (CHN)	1
Romas Fridrikas (LTU)	1

== Final standing ==
Rank	Athlete
1st place, gold medalist(s)	Amin Mirzazadeh (IRI)
2nd place, silver medalist(s)	Rıza Kayaalp (TUR)
3rd place, bronze medalist(s)	Abdellatif Mohamed (EGY)
3rd place, bronze medalist(s)	Óscar Pino (CUB)
5	Meng Lingzhe (CHN)
5	Romas Fridrikas (LTU)
7	Mykhailo Vyshnyvetskyi (UKR)
8	Iakobi Kajaia (GEO)
9	Heiki Nabi (EST)
10	Cohlton Schultz (USA)
11	David Ovasapyan (ARM)
12	Lee Seung-chan (KOR)
13	Elias Kuosmanen (FIN)
14	Oskar Marvik (NOR)
15	Ilya Yudchyts (AIN)
16	Alin Alexuc-Ciurariu (ROU)
17	Eduard Soghomonyan (BRA)
18	Temurbek Nasimov (UZB)
19	Vitaly Shchur (AIN)
20	Beka Kandelaki (AZE)
21	Dárius Vitek (HUN)
22	Jello Krahmer (GER)
23	Sota Okumura (JPN)
24	Marcel Albini (CZE)
25	Daniel Gastl (AUT)
26	Yasmani Acosta (CHI)
27	Aýbegşazada Kürräýew (TKM)
28	Boris Petrušić (SRB)
29	Paul Morales (MEX)
30	Mehar Singh (UWW)

Qualified for the 2024 Summer Olympics
