= 2015 World Wrestling Championships – Men's Greco-Roman 130 kg =

Men's Greco-Roman 130 kg at the 2015 World Championships
- Venue: Orleans Arena
- Dates: 8 September 2015
- Competitors: 29 from 29 nations

Medalists
gold medal	Rıza Kayaalp	Turkey
silver medal	Mijaín López	Cuba
bronze medal	Oleksandr Chernetskyi	Ukraine
bronze medal	Robby Smith	United States

The men's Greco-Roman 130 kilograms is a competition featured at the 2015 World Wrestling Championships, and was held in Las Vegas, United States on 8 September 2015.

This Greco-Roman wrestling competition consisted of a single-elimination tournament, with a repechage used to determine the winners of two bronze medals.

== Results ==
Legend

- F — Won by fall
- R — Retired

=== Final ===
Final
Rıza Kayaalp (TUR)	1
Mijaín López (CUB)	0

=== Top half ===
Round of 32
Bálint Lám (HUN)	5
Mehdi Aliyari (IRI)	0
Arata Sonoda (JPN)	0
Lukas Hörmann (AUT)	4
Ioseb Chugoshvili (BLR)	0
Rıza Kayaalp (TUR)	2
Oleksandr Chernetskyi (UKR)	7^{F}
Andrés Ayub (CHI)	0
Meng Qiang (CHN)	6
Naveen Sevlia (IND)	2

Round of 16
Lyubomir Dimitrov (BUL)	7
Erwin Caraballo (VEN)	2^{F}
Sabah Shariati (AZE)	3
Bálint Lám (HUN)	1
Lukas Hörmann (AUT)	0
Rıza Kayaalp (TUR)	8
Oleksandr Chernetskyi (UKR)	9^{F}
Meng Qiang (CHN)	0

Quarterfinals
Erwin Caraballo (VEN)	0
Sabah Shariati (AZE)	9
Rıza Kayaalp (TUR)	8
Oleksandr Chernetskyi (UKR)	0

Semifinals
Sabah Shariati (AZE)	0
Rıza Kayaalp (TUR)	6

=== Bottom half ===
Round of 32
Nurmakhan Tinaliyev (KAZ)	1
Eduard Popp (GER)	3
Muminjon Abdullaev (UZB)	4
Robby Smith (USA)	11^{F}
Edgardo López (PUR)	0
Murat Ramonov (KGZ)	8
Edgar Khachatryan (ARM)	2
Eduard Soghomonyan (BRA)	4
Murodjon Tuychiev (TJK)	0
Mindaugas Mizgaitis (LTU)	8
Bilyal Makhov (RUS)	1
Mijaín López (CUB)	2
Iakobi Kajaia (GEO)	0
Heiki Nabi (EST)	1
Kenny Lester (ASA)	1
Kim Yong-min (KOR)	9

Round of 16
Eduard Popp (GER)	2
Robby Smith (USA)	6
Murat Ramonov (KGZ)	6
Eduard Soghomonyan (BRA)	1
Mindaugas Mizgaitis (LTU)	0
Mijaín López (CUB)	3
Heiki Nabi (EST)	3
Kim Yong-min (KOR)	2

Quarterfinals
Robby Smith (USA)	1
Murat Ramonov (KGZ)	1
Mijaín López (CUB)	2
Heiki Nabi (EST)	0

Semifinals
Robby Smith (USA)	0
Mijaín López (CUB)	8

=== Repechage ===
Repechage round 1
Ioseb Chugoshvili (BLR)	3
Lukas Hörmann (AUT)	0
Bilyal Makhov (RUS)	2
Mindaugas Mizgaitis (LTU)	0^{R}

Repechage round 2
Ioseb Chugoshvili (BLR)	0
Oleksandr Chernetskyi (UKR)	8
Bilyal Makhov (RUS)	5
Heiki Nabi (EST)	0

Bronze medals
Oleksandr Chernetskyi (UKR)	4^{F}
Sabah Shariati (AZE)	0
Bilyal Makhov (RUS)	10
Robby Smith (USA)	8

- Bilyal Makhov of Russia originally won the bronze medal but was disqualified in 2025 due to doping offenses. Robby Smith was raised to third and took the bronze medal.
