= Wrestling at the 2022 Asian Games – Men's Greco-Roman 130 kg =

Men's Greco-Roman 130 kg at the 2022 Asian Games
- Venue: Lin'an Sports and Culture Centre
- Date: 5 October 2023
- Competitors: 11 from 11 nations

Medalists
gold medal	Amin Mirzazadeh	Iran
silver medal	Meng Lingzhe	China
bronze medal	Kim Min-seok	South Korea
bronze medal	Alimkhan Syzdykov	Kazakhstan

The men's 130 kilograms Greco-Roman wrestling competition at the 2022 Asian Games was held on 5 October 2023 at the Lin'an Sports and Culture Centre in Hangzhou. The event was competed by 11 competitors from 11 nations. Amin Mirzazadeh of Iran won the gold medal after defeating Meng Lingzhe of China in the final. Kim Min-seok of South Korea and Alimkhan Syzdykov of Kazakhstan won the bronze medals.

== Background ==
Men's Greco-Roman wrestling was first contested at the 1962 Asian Games in Jakarta. It has been contested at every edition of the Asian Games since then.

Uzbekistan's Muminjon Abdullaev was the defending champion, having won the gold medal in the Greco-Roman 130 kg event at the 2018 Asian Games in Jakarta. Nurmakhan Tinaliyev of Kazakhstan won the silver medal, while Japan's Arata Sonoda and South Korea's Kim Min-seok won the bronze medals. Apart from Kim Min-seok, China's Meng Lingzhe, who finished seventh at the 2018 Asian Games, and India's Naveen Sevlia returned to compete in the 2022 Asian Games.

Mirzazadeh won the gold medal at the 2023 World Wrestling Championships after defeating Riza Kayaalp. He has also won a silver medal at the 2022 World Wrestling Championships, and is a two-time Asian champion, having won the title in 2020 and 2023. In the 2023 Asian Wrestling Championships, he defeated Meng 2–0 in the final. Apart from the silver medal at the 2023 Asian Wrestling Championships, Meng had finished fifth in the 130 kg category at the 2023 World Wrestling Championships.

Kyrgyzstan's Roman Kim has won three bronze medals at the Asian Wrestling Championships including in 2023, when he lost to Mirzazadeh in the quarterfinals. Min-seok also has three medals at the Asian Wrestling Championships with best place finishes of second in 2020 and 2022. He was beaten by Mirzazadeh in the finals in 2020 and lost to Kazakhstan's Alimkhan Syzdykov in 2022, who also took part in the contest. Uzbekistan's Temurbek Nasimov finished fifth in the 2023 Asian Wrestling Championships.

== Format ==
The Greco-Roman wrestling competition was competed as a single-elimination tournament. The two finalists competed against each other for the gold and silver medals. Each wrestler who loses to one of the two finalists moves into the repechage rounds, which is used to determine the bronze medals. The losers of the semifinals compete against the remaining repechage opponent from their half of the bracket in the bronze medal bout.

== Schedule ==
The men's Greco-Roman 130 kg event was held on 5 October 2023 held at the Lin'an Sports and Culture Centre in Hangzhou.

All times are China Standard Time (UTC+08:00)

Date	Time	Event
Thursday, 5 October 2023	10:00	1/8 finals
Thursday, 5 October 2023	10:00	1/4 finals
Thursday, 5 October 2023	10:00	Semifinals
Thursday, 5 October 2023	10:00	Repechages
Thursday, 5 October 2023	17:00	Finals

== Summary ==
Mirzazadeh won his first two rounds by technical superiority to reach the semifinals. In the semifinals, he defeated Syzdykov 3–1 to qualify for the final. The other finalist was Meng, who defeated Timothy Loh of Singapore by technical superiority in the opening round and Naveen in the quarterfinals by a score of 3–0 to advance to the semifinals. In the semifinals, Meng and Min-seok were tied with a point apiece at the end of the bout, but Meng won by the tie-breaker criteria.

In the final, both Mirzazadeh and Meng had scored a point apiece at the end of the bout. Both wrestlers had bee awarded a point due to passivity of the opponent at various stages of the match. However, because Mirzazadeh scored the last point, he was declared the winner and won the gold medal, while Meng settled for silver.

Min-seok and Syzdykov won the two bronze medals. Kim defeated Naveen 5–1 in his bronze-medal bout, while Syzdykov defeated Turkmenistan's Aybegshazada Kurrayev by a similar scoreline to claim the other bronze medal.

== Results ==
Legend

- F — Won by fall

=== Main bracket ===
1/8 finals
Meng Lingzhe (CHN)	9
Timothy Loh (SGP)	0
Amin Mirzazadeh (IRI)	9
Nanthawat Panphuek (THA)	0
Sota Okumura (JPN)	0
Temurbek Nasimov (UZB)	9

1/4 finals
Naveen Sevlia (IND)	0
Meng Lingzhe (CHN)	3
Roman Kim (KGZ)	4
Kim Min-seok (KOR)	5
Aýbegşazada Kürräýew (TKM)	0
Amin Mirzazadeh (IRI)	9
Temurbek Nasimov (UZB)	1
Alimkhan Syzdykov (KAZ)	9^{F}

Semifinals
Meng Lingzhe (CHN)	1
Kim Min-seok (KOR)	1
Amin Mirzazadeh (IRI)	3
Alimkhan Syzdykov (KAZ)	1

Gold medal match
Meng Lingzhe (CHN)	1
Amin Mirzazadeh (IRI)	1

=== Repechage ===
Repechage round 1
Timothy Loh (SGP)	0
Naveen Sevlia (IND)	9
Nanthawat Panphuek (THA)	0
Aýbegşazada Kürräýew (TKM)	9

Bronze medal matches
Naveen Sevlia (IND)	1
Kim Min-seok (KOR)	5
Aýbegşazada Kürräýew (TKM)	1
Alimkhan Syzdykov (KAZ)	5

== Final standing ==
Rank	Athlete
1st place, gold medalist(s)	Amin Mirzazadeh (IRI)
2nd place, silver medalist(s)	Meng Lingzhe (CHN)
3rd place, bronze medalist(s)	Kim Min-seok (KOR)
3rd place, bronze medalist(s)	Alimkhan Syzdykov (KAZ)
5	Naveen Sevlia (IND)
5	Aýbegşazada Kürräýew (TKM)
7	Temurbek Nasimov (UZB)
8	Roman Kim (KGZ)
9	Sota Okumura (JPN)
10	Timothy Loh (SGP)
11	Nanthawat Panphuek (THA)
