= 2025 World Wrestling Championships – Men's Greco-Roman 130 kg =

Wrestling competitions

Men's Greco-Roman 130 kg at the 2025 World Championships
- Venue: Arena Zagreb
- Dates: 18–19 September 2025
- Competitors: 27 from 25 nations

Medalists
gold medal	Amin Mirzazadeh	Iran
silver medal	Dárius Vitek	Hungary
bronze medal	Elias Kuosmanen	Finland
bronze medal	Pavel Hlinchuk

The men's Greco-Roman 130 kilograms is a competition featured at the 2025 World Wrestling Championships, and was held in Zagreb, Croatia on 18 and 19 September 2025.

This Greco-Roman wrestling competition consists of a single-elimination tournament, with a repechage used to determine the winner of two bronze medals. The two finalists face off for gold and silver medals. Each wrestler who loses to one of the two finalists moves into the repechage, culminating in a pair of bronze medal matches, featuring the semifinal losers each facing the remaining repechage opponent from their half of the bracket.

== Results ==
Legend

- F — Won by fall

=== Final ===
Final
Amin Mirzazadeh (IRI)	7
Dárius Vitek (HUN)	2

=== Top half ===
Round of 32
Marko Koščević (CRO)	8
Sonu Sharma (IND)	0
Elias Kuosmanen (FIN)	6
Yuta Nara (JPN)	1
Cohlton Schultz (USA)	2
Sergey Semenov (UWW)	5
Jiang Wenhao (CHN)	6^{F}
Ali Yaseen (IRQ)	0
Jello Krahmer (GER)	9
Gino Ávila (HON)	0

Round of 16
Amin Mirzazadeh (IRI)	8
Marko Koščević (CRO)	0
Elias Kuosmanen (FIN)	3
Sergey Semenov (UWW)	3
Mantas Knystautas (LTU)	0
Jiang Wenhao (CHN)	3
Jello Krahmer (GER)	1
Heiki Nabi (EST)	1

Quarterfinals
Amin Mirzazadeh (IRI)	3^{F}
Elias Kuosmanen (FIN)	4
Jiang Wenhao (CHN)	4
Jello Krahmer (GER)	1

Semifinals
Amin Mirzazadeh (IRI)	3
Jiang Wenhao (CHN)	1

=== Bottom half ===
Round of 32
Batbayaryn Nambardagva (MGL)	1
Mykola Kuchmii (UKR)	5
Moisés Pérez (VEN)	0
Lee Seung-chan (KOR)	9
Nurmanbet Raimaly Uulu (KGZ)	3
Dárius Vitek (HUN)	4
Beka Kandelaki (AZE)	1
Razmik Kurdyan (ARM)	1
Pavel Hlinchuk (UWW)	9
Sulkhan Buidze (GEO)	0
Óscar Pino (CUB)	3
Jacob Logård (SWE)	1

Round of 16
Alimkhan Syzdykov (KAZ)	4
Mykola Kuchmii (UKR)	6
Lee Seung-chan (KOR)	5
Dárius Vitek (HUN)	9^{F}
Razmik Kurdyan (ARM)	3
Pavel Hlinchuk (UWW)	5
Óscar Pino (CUB)	1
Hamza Bakır (TUR)	3

Quarterfinals
Mykola Kuchmii (UKR)	1
Dárius Vitek (HUN)	1
Pavel Hlinchuk (UWW)	8^{F}
Hamza Bakır (TUR)	0

Semifinals
Dárius Vitek (HUN)	1
Pavel Hlinchuk (UWW)	1

=== Repechage ===
Repechage round 1
Nurmanbet Raimaly Uulu (KGZ)	4
Lee Seung-chan (KOR)	8

Repechage round 2
Marko Koščević (CRO)	1
Elias Kuosmanen (FIN)	4
Lee Seung-chan (KOR)	1
Mykola Kuchmii (UKR)	3

Bronze medals
Elias Kuosmanen (FIN)	3
Jiang Wenhao (CHN)	3
Mykola Kuchmii (UKR)	1
Pavel Hlinchuk (UWW)	9

== Final standing ==
Rank	Athlete
1st place, gold medalist(s)	Amin Mirzazadeh (IRI)
2nd place, silver medalist(s)	Dárius Vitek (HUN)
3rd place, bronze medalist(s)	Elias Kuosmanen (FIN)
3rd place, bronze medalist(s)	Pavel Hlinchuk (UWW)
5	Jiang Wenhao (CHN)
5	Mykola Kuchmii (UKR)
7	Lee Seung-chan (KOR)
8	Jello Krahmer (GER)
9	Marko Koščević (CRO)
10	Sergey Semenov (UWW)
11	Óscar Pino (CUB)
12	Razmik Kurdyan (ARM)
13	Hamza Bakır (TUR)
14	Nurmanbet Raimaly Uulu (KGZ)
15	Alimkhan Syzdykov (KAZ)
16	Cohlton Schultz (USA)
17	Heiki Nabi (EST)
18	Beka Kandelaki (AZE)
19	Jacob Logård (SWE)
20	Batbayaryn Nambardagva (MGL)
21	Yuta Nara (JPN)
22	Mantas Knystautas (LTU)
23	Ali Yaseen (IRQ)
24	Sonu Sharma (IND)
25	Gino Ávila (HON)
26	Moisés Pérez (VEN)
27	Sulkhan Buidze (GEO)
