= Adam Coon =

American wrestler (born 1994)

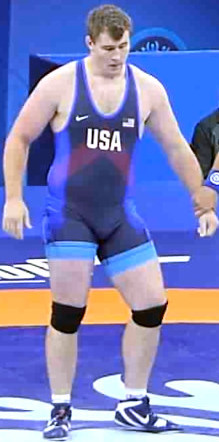
- Coon in 2018

Personal information
- Full name: Adam Jacob Coon
- Born: November 14, 1994 (age 31) Fowlerville, Michigan, U.S.
- Height: 196 cm (6 ft 5 in)

Sport
- Country: United States
- Sport: Wrestling
- Weight class: 130 kg
- Events: Greco-Roman, Freestyle and Folkstyle
- University team: Michigan Wolverines
- Club: Cliff Keen WC; New York AC
Medal record
Representing the United States
Men's Greco-Roman wrestling
World Championships
Silver medal – second place	2018 Budapest	130 kg
Pan American Championships
Gold medal – first place	2019 Buenos Aires	130 kg
Silver medal – second place	2020 Ottawa	130 kg
Junior World Championships
Bronze medal – third place	2014 Zagreb	120 kg
Men's freestyle wrestling
Junior World Championships
Bronze medal – third place	2014 Zagreb	120 kg
Cadet World Championships
Gold medal – first place	2011 Szombathely	100 kg
Representing Cliff Keen WC
University Freestyle Nationals
Gold medal – first place	2014 Akron	125 kg
FILA Junior Freestyle National Championships
Gold medal – first place	2014 Las Vegas	120 kg
Men's collegiate wrestling
Representing the Michigan Wolverines
NCAA Division I Championships
Silver medal – second place	2015 St. Louis	285 lb
Silver medal – second place	2018 Cleveland	285 lb
Bronze medal – third place	2016 New York	285 lb
Big Ten Championships
Silver medal – second place	2016 Iowa City	285 lb
Silver medal – second place	2018 East Lansing	285 lb
Bronze medal – third place	2015 Columbus	285 lb
- Football career

Seattle Sea Dragons
- Position: Offensive guard

Career information
- College: Michigan
- NFL draft: 2018: undrafted

Career history
- Tennessee Titans (2021)*; Seattle Sea Dragons (2023)*
- * Offseason or practice squad member only

Adam Jacob Coon (born November 14, 1994) is an American heavyweight Greco-Roman wrestler. He was also a former professional football player, playing offensive guard for the Seattle Sea Dragons of the XFL, notable for not having played football in college. Coon was an accomplished wrestler at the state, national, and international levels. He was a 2011 Cadet World freestyle gold medalist, 2014 Junior World double bronze medalist in both Greco-Roman and freestyle, two-time NCAA Division I finalist (2015, 2018), 2018 Senior World silver medalist in Greco-Roman, and a Pan American gold medalist in 2019 and silver medalist in 2020.

== Early life ==
Coon was a four-time Michigan state high school champion for Fowlerville High School, winning at 215 pounds in 2010 and 2011 and at 285 pounds in 2012 and 2013, while compiling a 212–3 career record, finishing with three straight undefeated seasons. He became 2011 FILA Cadet World champion at 100kg and two-time USA Wrestling Junior Triple Crown winner by capturing titles in folkstyle, Greco-Roman and freestyle in 2012 and 2013.

For his 2013 performance, Coon was named Detroit Athletic Club HS Athlete of the Year, and received the Dave Schultz High School Excellence Award (Midwest region), Michigan's "Mr. Wrestler" award, and the Junior Schalles Award for best high school pinner. Coon lettered in football and track and field, becoming a state runner-up in discus and shot put. He was also in the National Honor Society and the class of 2013 salutatorian.

== College wrestling career ==
Coon enrolled at the University of Michigan's College of Engineering, majoring in aerospace engineering. In his freshman year at heavyweight, he won the Michigan State Open, the Cliff Keen Las Vegas championship (defeating Nick Gwiazdowski in the quarterfinals), and the Ken Kraft Midlands championship, but went 0–2 at the Big Ten championship, and 2–2 at the 2014 NCAA championships to finish shy of All-American honors. That summer he rebounded by winning University Freestyle Nationals at 125 kg, and freestyle and Greco-Roman 120 kg championships at the 2014 FILA Junior World Team Trials to secure his spot at the World Junior Championships. At the world championships, Coon defeated Arata Sonoda in Greco-Roman and Yunus Emre Dede in freestyle to win double bronze, a rare achievement.

In his sophomore year, Coon was named team co-captain, capturing another MSU Open championship, finishing third at Cliff Keen, second at the Southern Scuffle, and third at the Big Ten championships. At the 2015 NCAA championships, he lost to Gwiazdowski in the heavyweight finals, going 4-1 and earning All-American, Academic All-Big Ten, and NWCA All-Academic honors.

As a junior, Coon won the Greco-Roman 130 kg titles at the 2015 Bill Farrell International Open and at the U.S. Open, placed second at the Big Ten championship after losing to Kyle Snyder in the finals, and went 5–1 at the 2016 NCAA championships to place third behind Snyder and Gwiazdowski, earning All-American and All-Academic honors again. Coon was an alternate in Greco-Roman for the 2016 Olympics in Brazil after placing second at the United States Olympic Team Trials.

Despite redshirting due to injury in his senior year, he received a U-M Athletic Academic Achievement Award. Coon returned with strong showings as a graduate student for the 2017–18 season, winning his third MSU Open title, second Cliff Keen Invitational title, beating no.1 ranked 2016 gold medalist Kyle Snyder in the Clash at Crisler dual meet for Snyder's first loss in over two years, placing second at the Big Ten championships after losing to Snyder in double over-time, and second at the 2018 NCAA championships after losing to Snyder again, earning All-American and All-Academic honors for the third time, and a second Athletic Academic Achievement Award. Coon finished his college career with a 116–15 overall record and .885 win percentage, the sixth highest in U-M history.

== Football career ==
On June 4, 2021, the Tennessee Titans signed Coon to play on the offensive line. He was an All-State linebacker in high school and was an honorable mention offensive lineman. He attended the University of Michigan, but never played college football. On August 12, 2021, Coon was waived/injured by the Titans and placed on injured reserve. He was released on August 20, 2021.

On June 15, 2022, Coon had a workout with the Atlanta Falcons.

Coon was assigned to the Seattle Sea Dragons of the XFL on January 6, 2023.

== Greco-Roman wrestling career ==
After graduating college, Coon pursued an international career in the Greco-Roman style. In 2019, Coon won the gold medal in the 130 kg event at the Pan American Wrestling Championships held in Buenos Aires, Argentina. In the same year, he also represented the United States at the 2019 Pan American Games in the 130 kg event without winning a medal; he was eliminated in his first match by Yasmani Acosta of Chile who went on to win one of the bronze medals.

At the 2019 World Wrestling Championships held in Nur-Sultan, Kazakhstan, he competed in the 130 kg event where he was eliminated in his first match by Meng Lingzhe of China.

In March 2020, at the Pan American Wrestling Championships held in Ottawa, Canada, he won the silver medal in the 130 kg event. A few days later, he competed in the 2020 Pan American Wrestling Olympic Qualification Tournament, also held in Ottawa, Canada, without qualifying for the 2020 Summer Olympics in Tokyo, Japan. In May 2021, he also failed to qualify for the Olympics at the World Olympic Qualification Tournament held in Sofia, Bulgaria.

In January 2023, Coon resumed training in Greco-Roman wrestling, and made the USA Greco-Roman wrestling team for the 2024 Olympics. He competed in the 130 kg event at the Olympics.
