= 2025 European Wrestling Championships – Men's Greco-Roman 130 kg =

Wrestling competition

Men's Greco-Roman 130 kg at the 2025 European Wrestling Championships
- Venue: X-Bionic Sphere
- Location: Bratislava, Slovakia
- Dates: 11-12 April
- Competitors: 14

Medalists
gold medal	Sergey Semenov
silver medal	Hamza Bakır	Turkey
bronze medal	Dáriusz Vitek	Hungary
bronze medal	Jello Krahmer	Germany

The men's Greco-Roman 130 kg is a competition featured at the 2025 European Wrestling Championships, and was held in Bratislava, Slovakia on April 11 and 12.

== Results ==
Legend

- F — Won by fall
- R — Retired

=== Main bracket ===
Round of 16
Dzmitry Zarubski (UWW)	6^{F}
Apostolos Tsiovolos (GRE)	4
Sergey Semenov (UWW)	8
Dáriusz Vitek (HUN)	0
Danila Sotnikov (ITA)	5
Konsta Mäenpää (FIN)	1
Hamza Bakır (TUR)	1
David Ovasapyan (ARM)	1
Beka Kandelaki (AZE)	7^{F}
Mykhailo Vyshnyvetskyi (UKR)	1
Jello Krahmer (GER)	2
Sulkhan Buidze (GEO)	1

Quarterfinals
Mantas Knystautas (LTU)	3^{R}
Dzmitry Zarubski (UWW)	1
Sergey Semenov (UWW)	4
Danila Sotnikov (ITA)	0
Hamza Bakır (TUR)	2
Beka Kandelaki (AZE)	0
Jello Krahmer (GER)	1
Heiki Nabi (EST)	1

Semifinals
Dzmitry Zarubski (UWW)	0
Sergey Semenov (UWW)	8^{F}
Hamza Bakır (TUR)	3
Jello Krahmer (GER)	2

Final
Sergey Semenov (UWW)	1
Hamza Bakır (TUR)	1

=== Repechage ===
Repechage round 1
Dáriusz Vitek (HUN)	6
Danila Sotnikov (ITA)	3
David Ovasapyan (ARM)	0
Beka Kandelaki (AZE)	2

Bronze medal match
Dáriusz Vitek (HUN)	6
Dzmitry Zarubski (UWW)	0
Beka Kandelaki (AZE)	1
Jello Krahmer (GER)	1

== Final standing ==
Rank	Athlete
1st place, gold medalist(s)	Sergey Semenov (UWW)
2nd place, silver medalist(s)	Hamza Bakır (TUR)
3rd place, bronze medalist(s)	Dáriusz Vitek (HUN)
3rd place, bronze medalist(s)	Jello Krahmer (GER)
5	Dzmitry Zarubski (UWW)
5	Beka Kandelaki (AZE)
7	Danila Sotnikov (ITA)
8	Heiki Nabi (EST)
9	Sulkhan Buidze (GEO)
10	David Ovasapyan (ARM)
11	Konsta Mäenpää (FIN)
12	Apostolos Tsiovolos (GRE)
13	Mantas Knystautas (LTU)
14	Mykhailo Vyshnyvetskyi (UKR)
