= 2018 World Wrestling Championships – Men's Greco-Roman 130 kg =

Men's Greco-Roman 130 kg at the 2018 World Championships
- Venue: László Papp Budapest Sports Arena
- Dates: 27–28 October 2018
- Competitors: 24 from 24 nations

Medalists
gold medal	Sergey Semenov	Russia
silver medal	Adam Coon	United States
bronze medal	Óscar Pino	Cuba
bronze medal	Kim Min-seok	South Korea

The men's Greco-Roman 130 kilograms is a competition featured at the 2018 World Wrestling Championships, and was held in Budapest, Hungary on 27 and 28 October.

This Greco-Roman wrestling competition consists of a single-elimination tournament, with a repechage used to determine the winner of two bronze medals. The two finalists face off for gold and silver medals. Each wrestler who loses to one of the two finalists moves into the repechage, culminating in a pair of bronze medal matches featuring the semifinal losers each facing the remaining repechage opponent from their half of the bracket.

== Results ==
Legend

- F — Won by fall
- R — Retired

=== Final ===
Final
Sergey Semenov (RUS)	9
Adam Coon (USA)	0

=== Top half ===
Round of 32
Oleksandr Chernetskyi (UKR)	5
Sabah Shariati (AZE)	2
Shahab Ghourehjili (IRI)	1
Zviadi Pataridze (GEO)	2

Round of 16
Rıza Kayaalp (TUR)	1
Heiki Nabi (EST)	2
Yasmani Acosta (CHI)	8
Mansur Shadukayev (KAZ)	0
Sergey Semenov (RUS)	10
Oleksandr Chernetskyi (UKR)	1
Zviadi Pataridze (GEO)	2
Óscar Pino (CUB)	2

Quarterfinals
Heiki Nabi (EST)	2
Yasmani Acosta (CHI)	1
Sergey Semenov (RUS)	6^{F}
Óscar Pino (CUB)	1

Semifinals
Heiki Nabi (EST)	0
Sergey Semenov (RUS)	2

=== Bottom half ===
Round of 32
Mantas Knystautas (LTU)	4
Ioseb Chugoshvili (BLR)	1
Naveen Sevlia (IND)	1
Oskar Marvik (NOR)	4
Štěpán David (CZE)	1
Kim Min-seok (KOR)	3
Arata Sonoda (JPN)	0
Meng Lingzhe (CHN)	8
Rafał Krajewski (POL)	0
Adam Coon (USA)	8^{F}
Eduard Popp (GER)	9
Abdellatif Mohamed (EGY)	0

Round of 16
Alin Alexuc-Ciurariu (ROU)	3
Mantas Knystautas (LTU)	1
Oskar Marvik (NOR)	1
Kim Min-seok (KOR)	2
Meng Lingzhe (CHN)	1
Adam Coon (USA)	5^{F}
Eduard Popp (GER)	5
Bálint Lám (HUN)	1

Quarterfinals
Alin Alexuc-Ciurariu (ROU)	2
Kim Min-seok (KOR)	3
Adam Coon (USA)	5^{F}
Eduard Popp (GER)	3

Semifinals
Kim Min-seok (KOR)	0
Adam Coon (USA)	7^{F}

=== Repechage ===
Repechage round 1
Rafał Krajewski (POL)	0
Meng Lingzhe (CHN)	10

Repechage round 2
Oleksandr Chernetskyi (UKR)	1^{R}
Óscar Pino (CUB)	1
Meng Lingzhe (CHN)	0
Eduard Popp (GER)	9

Bronze medals
Óscar Pino (CUB)	3
Heiki Nabi (EST)	1
Eduard Popp (GER)	1
Kim Min-seok (KOR)	2
