= Wrestling at the 2026 Asian Games – Men's Greco-Roman 130 kg =

Men's Greco-Roman 130 kg at the 2026 Asian Games
- Venue: Inae Sports Center
- Date: 30 September 2026
- Competitors: 10 from 10 nations

Medalists
gold medal	Amin Mirzazadeh	Iran
silver medal	Rafael Tsitsuashvili	Uzbekistan
bronze medal	Meng Lingzhe	China
bronze medal	Kim Min-seok	South Korea

The men's 130 kilograms Greco-Roman wrestling competition at the 2026 Asian Games was held on 30 September 2026 at the Inae Sports Center in Nagoya. The event was competed by 10 competitors. Amin Mirzazadeh of Iran won the gold medal after defeating Rafael Tsitsuashvili of Uzbekistan in the final. Lingzhe Meng of China and Kim Min-seok of South Korea won the bronze medals.

== Background ==
Men's Greco-Roman wrestling was first contested at the 1962 Asian Games in Jakarta. It has been contested at every edition of the Asian Games since then.

Iran's Amin Mirzazadeh was the defending champion, having won the gold medal in the men's Greco-Roman 130 kg event at the 2022 Asian Games in Hangzhou. Meng Lingzhe of China won the silver medal, while South Korea's Kim Min-seok and Kazakhstan's Alimkhan Syzdykov won the bronze medals. Except Syzdykov, all the other three medalists competed in the 2026 edition.

Amin Mirzazadeh was the bronze medallist at the 2024 Summer Olympics and won the gold medal at the 2023 and 2025 World Wrestling Championships. He is a four-time Asian champion, having won the title in 2020, 2023, 2024, and 2026 editions. Meng Lingzhe had won the bronze medal at the 2024 Summer Olympics and finished fifth in the 130 kg category at the 2023 World Wrestling Championships. Uzbekistan's Rafael Tsitsuashvili won the silver medal at the 2026 Asian Wrestling Championships after losing 9–0 to Mirzazadeh in the final, while South Korea's Kim Min-seok won the bronze medal. Kim had previously won the silver medal at the 2024 Asian Championships.

== Format ==
The Greco-Roman wrestling competition was competed as a single-elimination tournament. The two finalists competed against each other for the gold and silver medals. Each wrestler who loses to one of the two finalists moves into the repechage rounds, which is used to determine the bronze medals. The losers of the semifinals compete against the remaining repechage opponent from their half of the bracket in the bronze medal bout.

== Schedule ==
The men's Greco-Roman 125 kg event was held on 30 September 2026 held at the Inae Sports Center in Nagoya.

All times are Japan Standard Time (UTC+09:00)

Date	Time	Event
Wednesday, 30 September 2026	10:30	1/8 finals
Wednesday, 30 September 2026	10:30	1/4 finals
Wednesday, 30 September 2026	10:30	Semifinals
Wednesday, 30 September 2026	10:30	Repechages
Wednesday, 30 September 2026	18:00	Finals

== Summary ==
Amin Mirzazadeh defeated Murat Botoev of Kyrgyzstan 7–0 in the quarterfinals to reach the semifinals. In the semifinals against Meng Lingzhe, while the final score was tied at one point apiece, Amin Mirzazadeh was declared the winner after having scored the first point. Rafael Tsitsuashvili was the other finalist, having defeated Kim Min-seok in the opening round and Kazakhstan's Olzhas Syrlybay 2–1 in the quarterfinals. In the semifinals, he defeated Turkmenistan's Aslan Agadadaýew by technical superiority to reach the final.

In the final, Amin Mirzazadeh defeated Rafael Tsitsuashvili by a score of 3-1 to successfully defend his Asian Games title. Amin Mirzazadeh scored two points for a roll from the parterre position in the first period and maintained his lead when placed in the defensive position in the second period. Thus, Amin Mirzazadeh won his second consecutive Asian Games gold medal, while Rafael Tsitsuashvili settled for silver.

Meng Lingzhe and Kim Min-seok won the two bronze medals. Meng Lingzhe defeated Murat Botoev 5–0 in his bronze-medal bout, while Kim Min-seok defeated Aslan Agadadaýew 7–2 to win the other bronze medal. This was Kim Min-seok's third consecutive Asian Games medal.

== Results ==
=== Main bracket ===
1/8 finals
Yuta Nara (JPN)	1
Murat Botoev (KGZ)	1
Kim Min-seok (KOR)	1
Rafael Tsitsuashvili (UZB)	1

1/4 finals
Amin Mirzazadeh (IRI)	7
Murat Botoev (KGZ)	0
Meng Lingzhe (CHN)	8
Batbayaryn Nambardagva (MGL)	0
Aslan Agadadaýew (TKM)	9
Anucha Yospanya (THA)	0
Rafael Tsitsuashvili (UZB)	2
Olzhas Syrlybay (KAZ)	1

Semifinals
Amin Mirzazadeh (IRI)	1
Meng Lingzhe (CHN)	1
Aslan Agadadaýew (TKM)	0
Rafael Tsitsuashvili (UZB)	8

Final
Amin Mirzazadeh (IRI)	3
Rafael Tsitsuashvili (UZB)	1

=== Repechage ===
Repechage
Kim Min-seok (KOR)	6
Olzhas Syrlybay (KAZ)	1

Bronze medal matches
Murat Botoev (KGZ)	1
Meng Lingzhe (CHN)	5
Kim Min-seok (KOR)	7
Aslan Agadadaýew (TKM)	2

== Final standing ==
Rank	Athlete
1st place, gold medalist(s)	Amin Mirzazadeh (IRI)
2nd place, silver medalist(s)	Rafael Tsitsuashvili (UZB)
3rd place, bronze medalist(s)	Meng Lingzhe (CHN)
3rd place, bronze medalist(s)	Kim Min-seok (KOR)
5	Murat Botoev (KGZ)
5	Aslan Agadadaýew (TKM)
7	Olzhas Syrlybay (KAZ)
8	Yuta Nara (JPN)
9	Batbayaryn Nambardagva (MGL)
10	Anucha Yospanya (THA)
