= Wrestling at the 2024 Summer Olympics – Men's Greco-Roman 130 kg =

Men's Greco-Roman 130 kg at the Games of the XXXIII Olympiad
- Venue: Grand Palais Éphémère
- Date: 5–6 August 2024
- Competitors: 16 from 16 nations

Medalists
1st place, gold medalist(s)		Mijaín López	Cuba
2nd place, silver medalist(s)		Yasmani Acosta	Chile
3rd place, bronze medalist(s)		Amin Mirzazadeh	Iran
3rd place, bronze medalist(s)		Meng Lingzhe	China

Men's Greco-Roman 130 kg competition at the 2024 Summer Olympics in Paris, France, took place on 5–6 August 2024 at the Grand Palais Éphémère in Champ de Mars.

== Background ==
This was the 14th appearance of the men's Greco-Roman super heavyweight category, debuted in 1976 and it has appeared in every games since then.

- 1976-1984: +100kg,
- 1988-2000: 130kg
- 2004-2012: 120kg
- 2016- current: 130kg

Mijaín López became the first and only athlete in modern Olympics history to win five consecutive gold medals in the same individual event.

== Format ==
This Greco-Roman competition consists of a single-elimination tournament, with a repechage used to determine the winner of two bronze medals. The two finalists face off for gold and silver medals. Each wrestler who loses to one of the two finalists moves into the repechage, culminating in a pair of bronze medal matches featuring the semifinal losers each facing the remaining repechage opponent from their half of the bracket.

== Rules ==
A typical bout consists of two halves of three minutes each separated by a 30-second break. The two competitors compete on a mat, which is nine meters in diameter. Wrestlers try to score points by executing various legal maneuvers. Points ranging from one to five are awarded by the mat referee depending on the degree of difficulty of the maneuvers. Points are also awarded to the opponent in case of infractions such as illegal holds, passivity etc. A wrestler is automatically disqualified if three cautions are awarded during a bout. Forcing an opponent's shoulders to the mat results in an instant victory by fall.

During the course of a match, if a wrestler builds a 10-point advantage over the opponent, the bout is stopped and the leader is declared as the winner by technical superiority. The total scores are totaled at the end of the stipulated six-minute period, and the wrestler with the maximum points wins. In case of a tie, the wrestler who has scored the last point is declared the winner. A competitor might also be declared a winner if the opponent does not turn up or is medically unfit to compete.

== Qualification ==
Sixteen quota places were available with each nation restricted to a maximum of one spot. Five quota places were awarded at the 2023 World Wrestling Championships, which took place from the 16th to 24th of September in Belgrade, Serbia. The finalists of each category in the four continental qualification tournaments (Asia, Europe, the Americas, and the joint Africa & Oceania) were awarded quota places. The remainder of the total quota was allocated at the 2024 World Wrestling Olympic Qualification Tournament, offering a minimum of three quota places.

== Schedule ==
All times are Central European Time (UTC+02:00)

Date	Time	Event
5 August 2024	15:00	Qualification rounds
5 August 2024	21:00	Semifinals
6 August 2024	11:00	Repechage
6 August 2024	20:05	Finals

== Results ==
Sixteen athletes qualified for the competition.

Legend

- F — Won by fall

=== Main bracket ===
Round of 16
Amin Mirzazadeh (IRI)	3
Adam Coon (USA)	1
Mijaín López (CUB)	7
Lee Seung-chan (KOR)	0
Heiki Nabi (EST)	1
Sabah Shariati (AZE)	1
Alimkhan Syzdykov (KAZ)	3
Alin Alexuc-Ciurariu (ROU)	1
Meng Lingzhe (CHN)	4
Jello Krahmer (GER)	1
Oussama Assad (MAR)	0
Mantas Knystautas (LTU)	9
Yasmani Acosta (CHI)	1
Kiril Milov (BUL)	1
Hamza Bakır (TUR)	1
Abdellatif Mohamed (EGY)	3^{F}

Quarterfinals
Amin Mirzazadeh (IRI)	1
Mijaín López (CUB)	3
Sabah Shariati (AZE)	4
Alimkhan Syzdykov (KAZ)	0
Meng Lingzhe (CHN)	1
Mantas Knystautas (LTU)	1
Yasmani Acosta (CHI)	2
Abdellatif Mohamed (EGY)	1

Semifinals
Mijaín López (CUB)	4
Sabah Shariati (AZE)	1
Meng Lingzhe (CHN)	1
Yasmani Acosta (CHI)	1

Final
Mijaín López (CUB)	6
Yasmani Acosta (CHI)	0

=== Repechage ===
Repechage
Lee Seung-chan (KOR)	0
Amin Mirzazadeh (IRI)	9
Kiril Milov (BUL)	4
Abdellatif Mohamed (EGY)	6

Bronze medal matches
Amin Mirzazadeh (IRI)	4
Sabah Shariati (AZE)	0
Abdellatif Mohamed (EGY)	2
Meng Lingzhe (CHN)	5

== Final standing ==
Rank	Athlete
1st place, gold medalist(s)	Mijaín López (CUB)
2nd place, silver medalist(s)	Yasmani Acosta (CHI)
3rd place, bronze medalist(s)	Amin Mirzazadeh (IRI)
3rd place, bronze medalist(s)	Meng Lingzhe (CHN)
5	Sabah Shariati (AZE)
5	Abdellatif Mohamed (EGY)
7	Mantas Knystautas (LTU)
8	Alimkhan Syzdykov (KAZ)
9	Kiril Milov (BUL)
10	Heiki Nabi (EST)
11	Alin Alexuc-Ciurariu (ROU)
12	Adam Coon (USA)
13	Jello Krahmer (GER)
14	Hamza Bakır (TUR)
15	Oussama Assad (MAR)
16	Lee Seung-chan (KOR)
