= 2023 U23 World Wrestling Championships – Men's Greco-Roman 130 kg =

Wrestling competitions

Men's Greco-Roman 130 kg at the 2023 U23 World Championships
- Venue: Tirana Olympic Park
- Dates: 28–29 October
- Competitors: 15 from 12 nations

Medalists
| gold medal | Hamza Bakır | Turkey |
| silver medal | Mykhailo Vyshnyvetskyi | Ukraine |
| bronze medal | Mikhail Laptev | Authorised Neutral Athletes |
| bronze medal | Sarkhan Mammadov | Azerbaijan |

The men's Greco-Roman 130 kilograms is a competition featured at the 2023 U23 World Wrestling Championships, and was held in Tirana, Albania on 28 and 29 October 2023.

This Greco-Roman wrestling competition consists of a single-elimination tournament, with a repechage used to determine the winner of two bronze medals. The two finalists face off for gold and silver medals. Each wrestler who loses to one of the two finalists moves into the repechage, culminating in a pair of bronze medal matches featuring the semifinal losers each facing the remaining repechage opponent from their half of the bracket.

== Results ==
Legend

- F — Won by fall
- WO – Won by walkover

=== Main Bracket ===
Round of 16
Razmik Kurdyan (ARM) | 3
Sota Okumura (JPN) | 1
Mikhail Laptev (ANA) | 0
Hamza Bakır (TUR) | 4
Kaleb Reeves (USA) | 4
Assylbek Zhanibekuly (KAZ) | 5^{F}
Marcel Albini (CZE) | 0
Sarkhan Mammadov (AZE) | 8
Patrick Neumaier (GER) | 5
Mikita Kavalski (ANA) | 0
Giorgi Tsopurashvili (GEO) | 1
Apostolos Tsiovolos (GRE) | 1
Mykhailo Vyshnyvetskyi (UKR) | 4^{F}
Parvesh (UWW) | 0

Quarterfinals
Fekry Eissa (EGY) | 1
Razmik Kurdyan (ARM) | 5
Hamza Bakır (TUR) | 9
Assylbek Zhanibekuly (KAZ) | 0
Sarkhan Mammadov (AZE) | 1
Patrick Neumaier (GER) | 1
Apostolos Tsiovolos (GRE) | 7
Mykhailo Vyshnyvetskyi (UKR) | 4^{F}

Semifinals
Razmik Kurdyan (ARM) | 2
Hamza Bakır (TUR) | 4
Sarkhan Mammadov (AZE) | 1
Mykhailo Vyshnyvetskyi (UKR) | 1

Final
Hamza Bakır (TUR) | 5
Mykhailo Vyshnyvetskyi (UKR) | 3

=== Repechage ===
Repechage round 1
Mikhail Laptev (ANA) | WO
Assylbek Zhanibekuly (KAZ)
Parvesh (UWW) | 3
Apostolos Tsiovolos (GRE) | 7

Bronze medals
Mikhail Laptev (ANA) | 7
Razmik Kurdyan (ARM) | 1
Apostolos Tsiovolos (GRE) | 0
Sarkhan Mammadov (AZE) | 10

== Final standing ==
| Rank | Athlete |
|---|---|
| 1st place, gold medalist(s) | Hamza Bakır (TUR) |
| 2nd place, silver medalist(s) | Mykhailo Vyshnyvetskyi (UKR) |
| 3rd place, bronze medalist(s) | Mikhail Laptev (ANA) |
| 3rd place, bronze medalist(s) | Sarkhan Mammadov (AZE) |
| 5 | Razmik Kurdyan (ARM) |
| 5 | Apostolos Tsiovolos (GRE) |
| 7 | Assylbek Zhanibekuly (KAZ) |
| 8 | Patrick Neumaier (GER) |
| 9 | Parvesh (UWW) |
| 10 | Giorgi Tsopurashvili (GEO) |
| 11 | Sota Okumura (JPN) |
| 12 | Fekry Eissa (EGY) |
| 13 | Kaleb Reeves (USA) |
| 14 | Mikita Kavalski (ANA) |
| 15 | Marcel Albini (CZE) |
