= Amin Mirzazadeh =

Iranian Greco-Roman wrestler

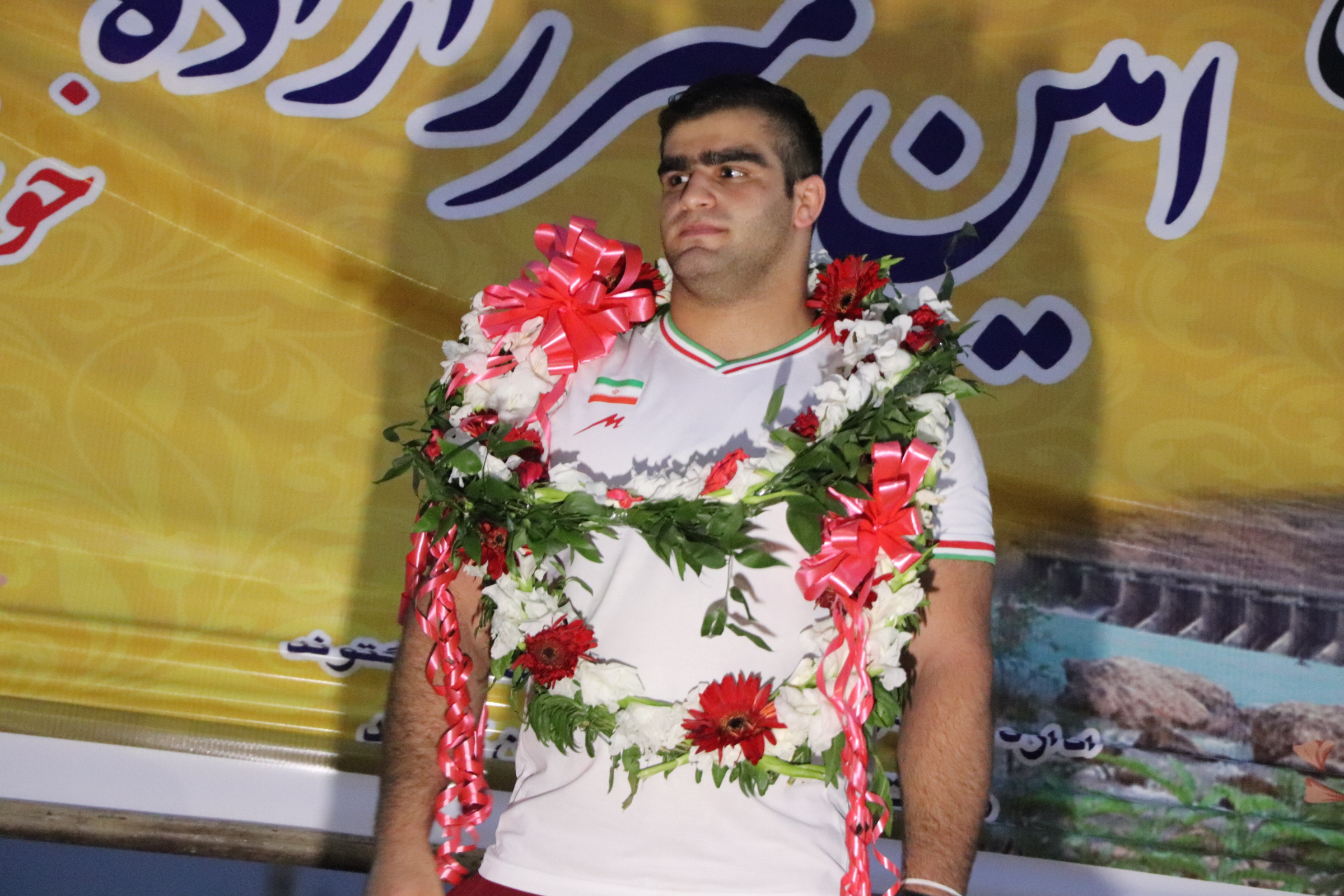
- Mirzazadeh was welcomed in his hometown after the 2020 Summer Olympics

Personal information
- Full name: Amin Mirzazadeh
- Born: 8 January 1998 (age 28) Gotvand, Iran
- Height: 185 cm (6 ft 1 in)
- Website: Official Instagram Profile

Sport
- Country: Iran
- Sport: Amateur wrestling
- Weight class: 130 kg
- Event: Greco-Roman
Medal record
Men's Greco-Roman wrestling
Representing Iran
Olympic Games
Bronze medal – third place	2024 Paris	130 kg
World Championships
Gold medal – first place	2023 Belgrade	130 kg
Gold medal – first place	2025 Zagreb	130 kg
Silver medal – second place	2022 Belgrade	130 kg
Asian Games
Gold medal – first place	2022 Hangzhou	130 kg
Gold medal – first place	2026 Aichi-Nagoya	130 kg
Asian Championships
Gold medal – first place	2020 New Delhi	130 kg
Gold medal – first place	2023 Astana	130 kg
Gold medal – first place	2024 Bishkek	130 kg
Gold medal – first place	2026 Bishkek	130 kg
Military World Games
Bronze medal – third place	2019 Wuhan	130 kg
Vehbi Emre & Hamit Kaplan Tournament
Silver medal – second place	2024 Antalya	130 kg
Grand Prix
Gold medal – first place	2021 Warsaw	130 kg
Gold medal – first place	2023 Bishkek	130 kg
Gold medal – first place	2025 Tirana	130 kg
Bronze medal – third place	2021 Kyiv	130 kg
World U23 Championships
Gold medal – first place	2021 Belgrade	130 kg
World Junior Championship
Gold medal – first place	2018 Trnava	130 kg
Bronze medal – third place	2017 Tampere	130 kg
Asian Junior Championship
Gold medal – first place	2018 New Delhi	130 kg
World Cadet Championships
Gold medal – first place	2015 Sarajevo	100 kg
Asian Cadet Championships
Gold medal – first place	2015 New Delhi	100 kg

Amin Mirzazadeh (Persian: امین میرزازاده, born 8 January 1998) is an Iranian Greco-Roman wrestler. He won the gold medal in the 130 kg event at the 2023 World Wrestling Championships held in Belgrade, Serbia. Mirzazadeh won one of the bronze medals in the 130 kg event at the 2024 Summer Olympics in Paris, France. He represented Iran at the 2020 Summer Olympics in Tokyo, Japan.

He won the gold medal in the 130 kg event at both the 2020 Asian Wrestling Championships held in New Delhi, India and the 2021 U23 World Wrestling Championships held in Belgrade, Serbia.

== Career ==
In 2019, Mirzazadeh represented Iran at the Military World Games held in Wuhan, China and he won one of the bronze medals in the 130 kg event.

In 2020, Mirzazadeh won the gold medal in the 130 kg event at the Asian Wrestling Championships held in New Delhi, India. In the final, he defeated Kim Min-seok of South Korea. In 2021, he won the gold medal in his event at the 2021 Wladyslaw Pytlasinski Cup held in Warsaw, Poland.

In August 2021, he lost his bronze medal match against Rıza Kayaalp of Turkey in the men's 130 kg event at the 2020 Summer Olympics held in Tokyo, Japan. In November 2021, he won the gold medal in the 130 kg event at the U23 World Wrestling Championships held in Belgrade, Serbia.

In April 2023, he won the gold medal in his event at the 2023 Asian Wrestling Championships held in Astana, Kazakhstan by defeating Meng Lingzhe. In September that year, he became world champion by defeating Rıza Kayaalp at the 2023 World Wrestling Championships.

He won the gold medal in the 130 kg event at the 2022 Asian Games held in Hangzhou, China. He defeated Meng Lingzhe of China in his gold medal match. In April 2024, Mirzazadeh won the gold medal in his event at the Asian Wrestling Championships held in Bishkek, Kyrgyzstan. In August 2024, he won one of the bronze medals in the 130 kg event at the Summer Olympics in Paris, France. He defeated Sabah Shariati of Azerbaijan in his bronze medal match.

== Achievements ==
Year	Tournament	Location	Result	Event
2019	Military World Games	Wuhan, China	3rd	Greco-Roman 130 kg
2020	Asian Wrestling Championships	New Delhi, India	1st	Greco-Roman 130 kg
2021	U23 World Championships	Belgrade, Serbia	1st	Greco-Roman 130 kg
2022	World Championships	Belgrade, Serbia	2nd	Greco-Roman 130 kg
2023	Asian Wrestling Championships	Astana, Kazakhstan	1st	Greco-Roman 130 kg
2023	World Championships	Belgrade, Serbia	1st	Greco-Roman 130 kg
2023	Asian Games	Hangzhou, China	1st	Greco-Roman 130 kg
2024	Asian Wrestling Championships	Bishkek, Kyrgyzstan	1st	Greco-Roman 130 kg
2024	Summer Olympics	Paris, France	3rd	Greco-Roman 130 kg
2025	World Championships	Zagreb, Croatia	1st	Greco-Roman 130 kg
