= Robby Smith =

American Greco-Roman wrestler

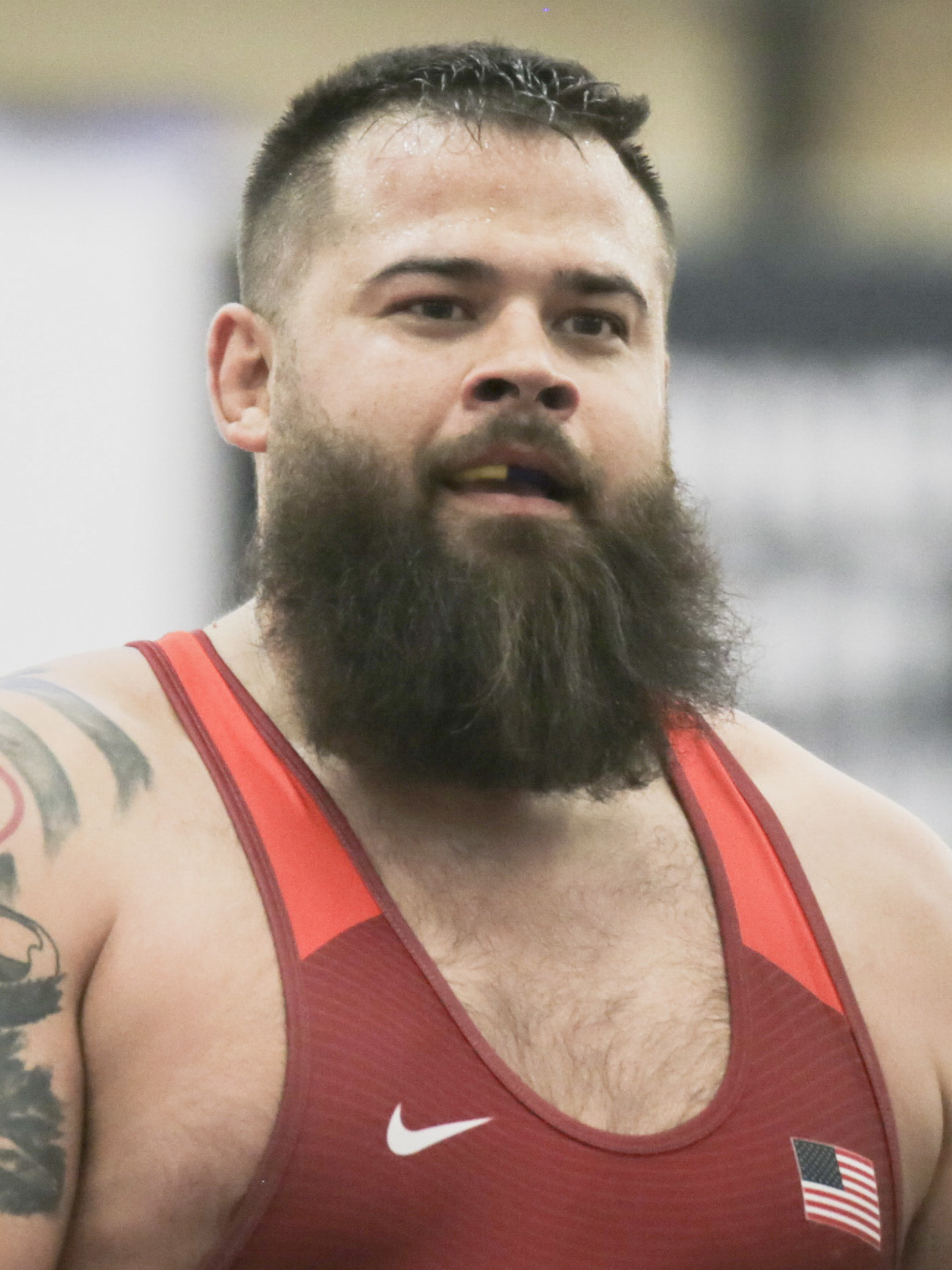
- Smith in 2018

Personal information
- Born: January 30, 1987 (age 39) Danville, California, U.S.
- Height: 6 ft 0 in (183 cm)
- Weight: 130 kg (287 lb)

Sport
- Country: United States
- Sport: Wrestling
- Event: Greco-Roman
- College team: Northern Michigan
- Club: New York Athletic Club
- Team: USA
Medal record
Men's Greco-Roman wrestling
Representing United States
World Championships
Bronze medal – third place	2015 Las Vegas	130 kg
Pan American Games
Bronze medal – third place	2015 Toronto	130 kg
Pan American Championships
Silver medal – second place	2018 Lima	130 kg

Robby Smith (born January 30, 1987) is an American Greco-Roman wrestler who competed at the 2016 Olympics.

He won a bronze medal at the 2015 Pan American Games in the Men's Greco-Roman 130 kg event.

Smith is a three-time competitor at the Wrestling World Championships with his best result being a pair of 5th-place finishes including in 2015. The 2015 5th place finish was upgraded to 3rd in 2025, after it was determined that his opponent in the 3rd place cheated by using a banned substance <https://www.themat.com/news/2025/october/15/robby-smith-upgraded-to-bronze-medal-in-greco-roman-at-2015-senior-world-championships>. This result secured the U.S. a place in the 2016 Olympics in his weight class. Smith won the 2016 U.S. Olympic Trials in the same division and represented the U.S. in Rio. He was defeated in the Round of 16 by Sabah Shariati.

He wrestles for the New York Athletic Club.

Smith attended Northern Michigan University.
