= Wrestling at the 2020 Summer Olympics – Men's Greco-Roman 130 kg =

Men's Greco-Roman 130 kg at the Games of the XXXII Olympiad
- Venue: Makuhari Messe
- Date: 1–2 August 2021
- Competitors: 16 from 16 nations

Medalists
1st place, gold medalist(s)		Mijaín López	Cuba
2nd place, silver medalist(s)		Iakobi Kajaia	Georgia
3rd place, bronze medalist(s)		Rıza Kayaalp	Turkey
3rd place, bronze medalist(s)		Sergey Semenov	ROC

The men's Greco-Roman 130 kilograms competition at the 2020 Summer Olympics in Tokyo, Japan, took place on 1–2 August 2021 at the Makuhari Messe in Mihama-ku.

This freestyle wrestling competition consists of a single-elimination tournament, with a repechage used to determine the winner of two bronze medals. The two finalists face off for gold and silver medals. Each wrestler who loses to one of the two finalists moves into the repechage, culminating in a pair of bronze medal matches featuring the semifinal losers each facing the remaining repechage opponent from their half of the bracket.

Mijaín López won the gold medal, becoming the first male wrestler to win four Olympic gold medals, as well as only the fifth athlete to win four gold medals in the same individual event.

The medals for the competition were presented by Uğur Erdener, IOC Member; Turkey, and the medalists' bouquets were presented by Nenad Lalović, UWW President; Serbia.

== Schedule ==
All times are Japan Standard Time (UTC+09:00)

Date	Time	Event
1 August 2021	11:00	Qualification rounds
1 August 2021	18:15	Semifinals
2 August 2021	11:00	Repechage
2 August 2021	19:30	Finals

== Results ==
Legend

- F — Won by fall

=== Main bracket ===
1/8 finals
Rıza Kayaalp (TUR)	5
Mantas Knystautas (LTU)	1
Eduard Soghomonyan (BRA)	0
Eduard Popp (GER)	2
Alin Alexuc-Ciurariu (ROU)	0
Mijaín López (CUB)	9
Kim Min-seok (KOR)	0
Amin Mirzazadeh (IRI)	6
Muminjon Abdullaev (UZB)	8
Artur Vititin (EST)	0
Yasmani Acosta (CHI)	5
Amine Guennichi (TUN)	1
Iakobi Kajaia (GEO)	9^{F}
Elias Kuosmanen (FIN)	0
Sergey Semenov (ROC)	3
Abdellatif Mohamed (EGY)	1

1/4 finals
Rıza Kayaalp (TUR)	6
Eduard Popp (GER)	2
Mijaín López (CUB)	8
Amin Mirzazadeh (IRI)	0
Muminjon Abdullaev (UZB)	0
Yasmani Acosta (CHI)	2
Iakobi Kajaia (GEO)	3
Sergey Semenov (ROC)	1

Semifinals
Rıza Kayaalp (TUR)	0
Mijaín López (CUB)	2
Yasmani Acosta (CHI)	1
Iakobi Kajaia (GEO)	1

Final
Mijaín López (CUB)	5
Iakobi Kajaia (GEO)	0

=== Repechage ===
Repechage
Alin Alexuc-Ciurariu (ROU)	1
Amin Mirzazadeh (IRI)	5
Elias Kuosmanen (FIN)	0
Sergey Semenov (ROC)	11

Bronze medal matches
Amin Mirzazadeh (IRI)	2
Rıza Kayaalp (TUR)	7
Sergey Semenov (ROC)	1
Yasmani Acosta (CHI)	1

== Final standing ==
Rank	Athlete
1st place, gold medalist(s)	Mijaín López (CUB)
2nd place, silver medalist(s)	Iakobi Kajaia (GEO)
3rd place, bronze medalist(s)	Rıza Kayaalp (TUR)
3rd place, bronze medalist(s)	Sergey Semenov (ROC)
5	Amin Mirzazadeh (IRI)
5	Yasmani Acosta (CHI)
7	Muminjon Abdullaev (UZB)
8	Eduard Popp (GER)
9	Abdellatif Mohamed (EGY)
10	Mantas Knystautas (LTU)
11	Amine Guennichi (TUN)
12	Alin Alexuc-Ciurariu (ROU)
13	Eduard Soghomonyan (BRA)
14	Kim Min-seok (KOR)
15	Artur Vititin (EST)
16	Elias Kuosmanen (FIN)
