= Wrestling at the 2018 Asian Games – Men's Greco-Roman 130 kg =

Men's Greco-Roman 130 kg at the 2018 Asian Games
- Venue: Jakarta Convention Center
- Date: 22 August 2018
- Competitors: 11 from 11 nations

Medalists
gold medal	Muminjon Abdullaev	Uzbekistan
silver medal	Nurmakhan Tinaliyev	Kazakhstan
bronze medal	Arata Sonoda	Japan
bronze medal	Kim Min-seok	South Korea

The men's Greco-Roman 130 kilograms wrestling competition at the 2018 Asian Games in Jakarta was held on 22 August 2018 at the Jakarta Convention Center Assembly Hall.

== Schedule ==
All times are Western Indonesia Time (UTC+07:00)

Date	Time	Event
Wednesday, 22 August 2018	13:00	1/8 finals
Wednesday, 22 August 2018	13:00	Quarterfinals
Wednesday, 22 August 2018	13:00	Semifinals
Wednesday, 22 August 2018	13:00	Repechages
Wednesday, 22 August 2018	19:00	Finals

== Results ==
Legend

- C — Won by 3 cautions given to the opponent
- F — Won by fall

=== Main bracket ===
1/8 finals
Muminjon Abdullaev (UZB)	7
Kim Min-seok (KOR)	0
Naveen Sevlia (IND)	1
Meng Lingzhe (CHN)	4
Murat Ramonov (KGZ)	3
Behnam Mehdizadeh (IRI)	10^{C}

Quarterfinals
Nurmakhan Tinaliyev (KAZ)	8
Papang Ramadhani (INA)	0
Süleýman Belliýew (TKM)	1
Arata Sonoda (JPN)	9
Sukhroj Azizov (TJK)	0
Muminjon Abdullaev (UZB)	9
Meng Lingzhe (CHN)	0
Behnam Mehdizadeh (IRI)	5^{F}

Semifinals
Nurmakhan Tinaliyev (KAZ)	6
Arata Sonoda (JPN)	0
Muminjon Abdullaev (UZB)	2
Behnam Mehdizadeh (IRI)	2

Final
Nurmakhan Tinaliyev (KAZ)	0
Muminjon Abdullaev (UZB)	8

=== Repechage ===
Repechage round 1
Kim Min-seok (KOR)	8
Sukhroj Azizov (TJK)	0

Bronze medals
Papang Ramadhani (INA)	0
Arata Sonoda (JPN)	2^{F}
Kim Min-seok (KOR)	1
Behnam Mehdizadeh (IRI)	1

== Final standing ==
Rank	Athlete
1st place, gold medalist(s)	Muminjon Abdullaev (UZB)
2nd place, silver medalist(s)	Nurmakhan Tinaliyev (KAZ)
3rd place, bronze medalist(s)	Arata Sonoda (JPN)
3rd place, bronze medalist(s)	Kim Min-seok (KOR)
5	Papang Ramadhani (INA)
5	Behnam Mehdizadeh (IRI)
7	Meng Lingzhe (CHN)
8	Naveen Sevlia (IND)
9	Süleýman Belliýew (TKM)
10	Murat Ramonov (KGZ)
11	Sukhroj Azizov (TJK)
