= Wrestling at the 2022 Mediterranean Games – Men's Greco-Roman 130 kg =

Wrestling competitions

Men's Greco-Roman 130 kg at the 2022 Mediterranean Games
- Venue: EMEC Hall
- Date: 26–27 June
- Competitors: 6 from 6 nations

Medalists
gold medal	Osman Yıldırım	Turkey
silver medal	Abdellatif Mohamed	Egypt
bronze medal	Amine Guennichi	Tunisia

The Men's Greco-Roman 130 kg competition of the wrestling events at the 2022 Mediterranean Games in Oran, Algeria, was held from 26 June to 27 June at the EMEC Hall.

== Results ==
26 June

=== Elimination groups ===
==== Group A ====
Pos	Athlete	Pld	W	L	CP	TP
1	Osman Yıldırım (TUR)	2	2	0	7	12
2	Abdellatif Mohamed (EGY)	2	1	1	5	9
3	Nikolaos Ntounias (GRE)	2	0	2	1	1

Source: Oran 2022

	Score		CP
Nikolaos Ntounias (GRE)	1–9	Osman Yıldırım (TUR)	1–4 VSU1
Abdellatif Mohamed (EGY)	8–0	Nikolaos Ntounias (GRE)	4–0 VSU
Osman Yıldırım (TUR)	3–1	Abdellatif Mohamed (EGY)	3–1 VPO1

==== Group B ====
Pos	Athlete	Pld	W	L	CP	TP
1	Amine Guennichi (TUN)	2	2	0	9	14
2	Hichem Kouchit (ALG)	2	1	1	4	10
3	Samuele Varicelli (ITA)	2	0	2	0	0

Source: Oran 2022

	Score		CP
Hichem Kouchit (ALG)	1–5 Fall	Amine Guennichi (TUN)	0–5 VFA
Samuele Varicelli (ITA)	0–9	Hichem Kouchit (ALG)	0–4 VSU
Amine Guennichi (TUN)	9–0	Samuele Varicelli (ITA)	4–0 VSU

Semifinals
Osman Yıldırım (TUR)	8
Hichem Kouchit (ALG)	0
Abdellatif Mohamed (EGY)	2
Amine Guennichi (TUN)	0

Final
Osman Yıldırım (TUR)	5
Abdellatif Mohamed (EGY)	1
Bronze medal
Hichem Kouchit (ALG)	0
Amine Guennichi (TUN)	8
