= 2014 World Junior Wrestling Championships =

Junior Wrestling Championships

- Host city: Zagreb, Croatia
- Dates: August 05–10, 2014

Champions
- Freestyle: Iran
- Greco-Roman: Azerbaijan
- Women: Japan

The 2014 World Junior Wrestling Championships were the 38th edition of the World Junior Wrestling Championships and were held in Zagreb, Croatia between August 5–10, 2014.

== Medal table ==
Rank	Nation	Gold	Silver	Bronze	Total
1	Azerbaijan	6	3	3	12
2	Russia	6	1	5	12
3	Japan	4	0	3	7
4	Iran	3	2	2	7
5	Turkey	1	1	4	6
6	Georgia	1	0	3	4
7	France	1	0	1	2
7	Mongolia	1	0	1	2
9	Canada	1	0	0	1
10	United States	0	2	8	10
11	Kazakhstan	0	2	1	3
11	Ukraine	0	2	1	3
13	Germany	0	2	0	2
14	Armenia	0	1	2	3
14	Hungary	0	1	2	3
14	India	0	1	2	3
17	China	0	1	1	2
17	Lithuania	0	1	1	2
19	Italy	0	1	0	1
19	Kyrgyzstan	0	1	0	1
19	South Korea	0	1	0	1
19	Uzbekistan	0	1	0	1
23	Bulgaria	0	0	1	1
23	Egypt	0	0	1	1
23	Finland	0	0	1	1
23	Greece	0	0	1	1
23	Norway	0	0	1	1
23	Poland	0	0	1	1
23	Romania	0	0	1	1
23	Slovakia	0	0	1	1
Totals (30 entries)		24	24	48	96

== Team ranking ==
Rank	Men's freestyle		Men's Greco-Roman		Women's freestyle	
Rank	Team	Points	Team	Points	Team	Points
1	Iran	65	Azerbaijan	59	Japan	57
2	United States	58	Georgia	44	Russia	45
3	Russia	49	Russia	31	Azerbaijan	33
4	Turkey	42	Armenia	31	Turkey	30
5	Kazakhstan	27	Turkey	28	United States	27

== Medal summary ==
=== Men's freestyle ===
Event	Gold	Silver	Bronze
50 kg	(Russia) Khasankhuseyn Badrudinov	(Uzbekistan) Makhmudjon Shavkatov	(Turkey) Emre Demircan
50 kg	(Russia) Khasankhuseyn Badrudinov	(Uzbekistan) Makhmudjon Shavkatov	(Iran) Saber Sharestani
55 kg	(Russia) Azamat Tuskaev	(Azerbaijan) Michalan Hasanzada	(Turkey) Barış Kaya
55 kg	(Russia) Azamat Tuskaev	(Azerbaijan) Michalan Hasanzada	(United States) Thomas Gilman
60 kg	(Iran) Iman Sadeghi	(United States) Joseph McKenna	(Azerbaijan) Vurghun Aliyev
60 kg	(Iran) Iman Sadeghi	(United States) Joseph McKenna	(Russia) Gadzhimurad Rashidov
66 kg	(Iran) Hassan Yazdani	(United States) Aaron Pico	(Japan) Daichi Takatani
66 kg	(Iran) Hassan Yazdani	(United States) Aaron Pico	(Russia) Rasul Arsanaliev
74 kg	(France) Zelimkhan Khadjiev	(Azerbaijan) Mahammadhaji Mukhutov	(Iran) Reza Mozaffari Jouybari
74 kg	(France) Zelimkhan Khadjiev	(Azerbaijan) Mahammadhaji Mukhutov	(Turkey) Murat Ertürk
84 kg	(Iran) Alireza Karimi	(Kazakhstan) Azamat Dauletbekov	(India) Praveen Praveen
84 kg	(Iran) Alireza Karimi	(Kazakhstan) Azamat Dauletbekov	(United States) Gabe Dean
96 kg	(Russia) Georgii Gogaev	(Turkey) Yusuf Can Zeybek	(Romania) Caras Vasile
96 kg	(Russia) Georgii Gogaev	(Turkey) Yusuf Can Zeybek	(United States) Kyle Snyder
120 kg	(Canada) Amar Dhesi	(Iran) Amin Taheri	(United States) Adam Coon
120 kg	(Canada) Amar Dhesi	(Iran) Amin Taheri	(Poland) Kamil Kościółek

=== Men's Greco-Roman ===
Event	Gold	Silver	Bronze
50 kg	(Azerbaijan) Ibrahim Nurullayev	(Ukraine) Oleksii Zhabskyy	(Slovakia) Zoltan Levai
50 kg	(Azerbaijan) Ibrahim Nurullayev	(Ukraine) Oleksii Zhabskyy	(Armenia) Slavik Galstyan
55 kg	(Azerbaijan) Murad Mammadov	(Kyrgyzstan) Rustam Teiishov	(Georgia (country)) Gizo Meladze
55 kg	(Azerbaijan) Murad Mammadov	(Kyrgyzstan) Rustam Teiishov	(Russia) Aslan Visaitov
60 kg	(Azerbaijan) Elman Mukhtarov	(Armenia) Karen Aslanyan	(France) Yasin Özay
60 kg	(Azerbaijan) Elman Mukhtarov	(Armenia) Karen Aslanyan	(Russia) Sergey Emelin
66 kg	(Georgia (country)) Shmagi Bolkvadze	(Azerbaijan) Ruhim Miraiylov	(Egypt) Ibrahim Ghanem
66 kg	(Georgia (country)) Shmagi Bolkvadze	(Azerbaijan) Ruhim Miraiylov	(Hungary) Zoltan Levai
74 kg	(Turkey) Furkan Bayrak	(Iran) Payam Bouyeri	(Georgia (country)) Gela Bolkvadze
74 kg	(Turkey) Furkan Bayrak	(Iran) Payam Bouyeri	(Armenia) Sarkis Kocharyan
84 kg	(Azerbaijan) Islam Abbasov	(Germany) Denis Kudla	(Greece) Dimitrios Tsekeridis
84 kg	(Azerbaijan) Islam Abbasov	(Germany) Denis Kudla	(Georgia (country)) Lasha Gobadze
96 kg	(Azerbaijan) Orkhan Nuriyev	(South Korea) Kim Seungjun	(Hungary) Zsolt Török
96 kg	(Azerbaijan) Orkhan Nuriyev	(South Korea) Kim Seungjun	(Norway) Felix Baldauf
120 kg	(Russia) Sergey Semenov	(Lithuania) Mantas Knystautas	(Turkey) Osman Yıldırım
120 kg	(Russia) Sergey Semenov	(Lithuania) Mantas Knystautas	(United States) Adam Coon

=== Women's freestyle ===
Event	Gold	Silver	Bronze
44 kg	(Japan) Haruka Uchijo	(India) Ritu Phogat	(Bulgaria) Miglena Selishka
44 kg	(Japan) Haruka Uchijo	(India) Ritu Phogat	(United States) Marina Doi
48 kg	(Japan) Yu Miyahara	(China) Ya Xie	(Russia) Milana Dadasheva
48 kg	(Japan) Yu Miyahara	(China) Ya Xie	(India) Mamta Rani
51 kg	(Russia) Natalia Malysheva	(Hungary) Mercédesz Dénes	(China) Yingfeng Qin
51 kg	(Russia) Natalia Malysheva	(Hungary) Mercédesz Dénes	(Ukraine) Lilya Horishna
55 kg	(Mongolia) Altantsetsegiin Battsetseg	(Ukraine) Tetyana Kit	(Japan) Nanami Irie
55 kg	(Mongolia) Altantsetsegiin Battsetseg	(Ukraine) Tetyana Kit	(Azerbaijan) Solmaz Hashimzade
59 kg	(Japan) Risako Kawai	(Germany) Luisa Niemesch	(Finland) Petra Olli
59 kg	(Japan) Risako Kawai	(Germany) Luisa Niemesch	(United States) Kayla Miracle
63 kg	(Russia) Lyubov Ovcharova	(Kazakhstan) Yekaterina Larionova	(Mongolia) Nyamgerel Burneebaatar
63 kg	(Russia) Lyubov Ovcharova	(Kazakhstan) Yekaterina Larionova	(Japan) Kiwa Sakae
67 kg	(Japan) Masako Furuichi	(Italy) Dalma Caneva	(Lithuania) Danute Domikaityte
67 kg	(Japan) Masako Furuichi	(Italy) Dalma Caneva	(Azerbaijan) Ragneta Gurbanzade
72 kg	(Azerbaijan) Sabira Aliyeva	(Russia) Anzhela Kataeva	(Kazakhstan) Zhamila Bakbergenova
72 kg	(Azerbaijan) Sabira Aliyeva	(Russia) Anzhela Kataeva	(United States) Victoria Francis
