= Amine Guennichi =

Tunisian Greco-Roman wrestler

Personal information
- Full name: Amine Al-Guennichi
- Born: 16 March 1999 (age 27)

Sport
- Country: Tunisia
- Sport: Amateur wrestling
- Weight class: 130 kg
- Event: Greco-Roman
Medal record
Men's Greco-Roman wrestling
Representing Tunisia
African Games
Silver medal – second place	2019 Rabat	130 kg
African Championships
Silver medal – second place	2020 Algiers	130 kg
Silver medal – second place	2022 El Jadida	130 kg
Silver medal – second place	2023 Hammamet	130 kg
Bronze medal – third place	2017 Marrakesh	98 kg
Bronze medal – third place	2018 Port Harcourt	97 kg
Bronze medal – third place	2019 Hammamet	97 kg
Mediterranean Games
Bronze medal – third place	2022 Oran	130 kg
Grand Prix
Silver medal – second place	2022 Tunis	130 kg

Amine Guennichi (born 16 March 1999) is a Tunisian Greco-Roman wrestler. He represented Tunisia at the 2019 African Games held in Rabat, Morocco and he won the silver medal in the 130 kg event. He is also a six-time medalist at the African Wrestling Championships.

== Career ==
He qualified at the 2021 African & Oceania Wrestling Olympic Qualification Tournament to represent Tunisia at the 2020 Summer Olympics in Tokyo, Japan. He competed in the men's 130 kg event.

In November 2021, he competed in the 130 kg event at the U23 World Wrestling Championships held in Belgrade, Serbia.

He won the silver medal in his event at the 2022 African Wrestling Championships held in El Jadida, Morocco. He won the bronze medal in the 130 kg event at the 2022 Mediterranean Games held in Oran, Algeria.

In 2024, he was handed a four-year doping ban.

== Achievements ==
Year	Tournament	Location	Result	Event
2017	African Wrestling Championships	Marrakesh, Morocco	3rd	Greco-Roman 98 kg
2018	African Wrestling Championships	Port Harcourt, Nigeria	3rd	Greco-Roman 97 kg
2019	African Wrestling Championships	Hammamet, Tunisia	3rd	Greco-Roman 97 kg
2019	African Games	Rabat, Morocco	2nd	Greco-Roman 130 kg
2020	African Wrestling Championships	Algiers, Algeria	2nd	Greco-Roman 130 kg
2022	African Wrestling Championships	El Jadida, Morocco	2nd	Greco-Roman 130 kg
2022	Mediterranean Games	Oran, Algeria	3rd	Greco-Roman 130 kg
2023	African Wrestling Championships	Hammamet, Tunisia	2nd	Greco-Roman 130 kg
