= 2021 U23 World Wrestling Championships – Men's Greco-Roman 130 kg =

Greco-Roman event at World Wrestling Championship

The men's Greco-Roman 130 kilograms is a competition featured at the 2021 U23 World Wrestling Championships, and was held in Belgrade, Serbia on 1 and 2 November.

== Medalists ==
Gold	Amin Mirzazadeh (IRI)
Silver	David Ovasapyan (ARM)
Bronze	Mikhail Laptev (RUS)
Bronze	Dáriusz Vitek (HUN)

== Results ==
Legend

- F — Won by fall

=== Final ===
Final
David Ovasapyan (ARM)	1
Amin Mirzazadeh (IRI)	2

=== Top half ===
Round of 32

Round of 16
Amine Guennichi (TUN)	1
Dáriusz Vitek (HUN)	8
Sarkhan Mammadov (AZE)	4^{F}
Diego Almendras (CHI)	0
Vladan Živković (SRB)	1
David Ovasapyan (ARM)	2^{F}
Lenard Berei (ROU)	1
Delian Alishahi (SUI)	1

Quarterfinals
Dáriusz Vitek (HUN)	4
Sarkhan Mammadov (AZE)	1
David Ovasapyan (ARM)	2
Delian Alishahi (SUI)	0

Semifinals
Dáriusz Vitek (HUN)	0
David Ovasapyan (ARM)	3^{F}

=== Bottom half ===
Round of 32
Franz Richter (GER)	6
Giorgi Tsopurashvili (GEO)	1
Nikolaos Ntounias (GRE)	1
Mikhail Laptev (RUS)	9
Amin Mirzazadeh (IRI)	6
Nikola Milatovic (NOR)	1

Round of 16
Brandon Metz (USA)	1
Vladyslav Kovalenko (UKR)	2
Fatih Bozkurt (TUR)	4^{F}
Aryan Panwar (IND)	0
Anton Savenko (KAZ)	9
Franz Richter (GER)	0
Mikhail Laptev (RUS)	1
Amin Mirzazadeh (IRI)	2

Quarterfinals
Vladyslav Kovalenko (UKR)	0
Fatih Bozkurt (TUR)	8
Anton Savenko (KAZ)	1
Amin Mirzazadeh (IRI)	3

Semifinals
Fatih Bozkurt (TUR)	1
Amin Mirzazadeh (IRI)	5

=== Repechage ===
Repechage round 1
Nikola Milatovic (NOR)	0
Mikhail Laptev (RUS)	8

Repechage round 2
Vladan Živković (SRB)	1
Delian Alishahi (SUI)	9
Mikhail Laptev (RUS)	8
Anton Savenko (KAZ)	0

Bronze medals
Delian Alishahi (SUI)	1
Dáriusz Vitek (HUN)	3
Mikhail Laptev (RUS)	6
Fatih Bozkurt (TUR)	0
