= 2022 European Wrestling Championships – Men's Greco-Roman 130 kg =

Wrestling competition

Men's Greco-Roman 130 kg at the 2022 European Wrestling Championships
- Venue: BOK Sports Hall
- Location: Budapest, Hungary
- Dates: 1-2 April
- Competitors: 15

Medalists
gold medal	Rıza Kayaalp	Turkey
silver medal	Danila Sotnikov	Italy
bronze medal	Konsta Mäenpää	Finland
bronze medal	Dáriusz Vitek	Hungary

The Men's Greco-Roman 130 kg is a competition featured at the 2022 European Wrestling Championships, and was held in Budapest, Hungary on April 1 and 2.

== Results ==
Legend

- F — Won by fall

=== Main Bracket ===
1/8 finals
Franz Richter (GER)	7
Marko Koščević (CRO)	3
Danila Sotnikov (ITA)	9
Štěpán David (CZE)	0
Konsta Mäenpää (FIN)	1
Mantas Knystautas (LTU)	1
Beka Kandelaki (AZE)	10
Mykhailo Vyshnyvetskyi (UKR)	0
David Ovasapyan (ARM)	3
Rafał Krajewski (POL)	1
Dáriusz Vitek (HUN)	2
Delian Alishahi (SUI)	1
Alin Alexuc-Ciurariu (ROU)	0
Rıza Kayaalp (TUR)	9

Quarterfinals
Iakobi Kajaia (GEO)	1
Franz Richter (GER)	4
Danila Sotnikov (ITA)	4^{F}
Konsta Mäenpää (FIN)	0
Beka Kandelaki (AZE)	5
David Ovasapyan (ARM)	1
Dáriusz Vitek (HUN)	0
Rıza Kayaalp (TUR)	6

Semifinals
Franz Richter (GER)	0
Danila Sotnikov (ITA)	4^{F}
Beka Kandelaki (AZE)	1
Rıza Kayaalp (TUR)	1

Final
Danila Sotnikov (ITA)	0
Rıza Kayaalp (TUR)	4

=== Repechage ===
Repechage round 1
Štěpán David (CZE)	1
Konsta Mäenpää (FIN)	5
Alin Alexuc-Ciurariu (ROU)	1
Dáriusz Vitek (HUN)	1

Bronze medal match
Konsta Mäenpää (FIN)	1
Franz Richter (GER)	1
Dáriusz Vitek (HUN)	4
Beka Kandelaki (AZE)	1

== Final standing ==
Rank	Athlete	UWW Points
1st place, gold medalist(s)	Rıza Kayaalp (TUR)	13000
2nd place, silver medalist(s)	Danila Sotnikov (ITA)	11000
3rd place, bronze medalist(s)	Konsta Mäenpää (FIN)	9500
3rd place, bronze medalist(s)	Dáriusz Vitek (HUN)	9500
5	Beka Kandelaki (AZE)	8000
5	Franz Richter (GER)	8000
7	David Ovasapyan (ARM)	7400
8	Marko Koščević (CRO)	7000
9	Mantas Knystautas (LTU)	6500
10	Delian Alishahi (SUI)	6100
11	Rafał Krajewski (POL)	4000
12	Iakobi Kajaia (GEO)	3800
13	Alin Alexuc-Ciurariu (ROU)	3600
14	Štěpán David (CZE)	3400
15	Mykhailo Vyshnyvetskyi (UKR)	3200
