= Wrestling at the 2015 Pan American Games – Men's Greco-Roman 130 kg =

Men's Greco-Roman 130 kg at the 2015 Pan American Games
- Venue: Mississauga Sports Centre
- Dates: July 16
- Competitors: 8 from 8 nations

Medalists
| Gold medal | Mijaín López; Cuba |
| Silver medal | Andrés Ayub; Chile |
| Bronze medal | Josue Encarnación; Dominican Republic |
| Bronze medal | Robby Smith; United States |

The Men's Greco-Roman 130 kg competition of the Wrestling events at the 2015 Pan American Games in Toronto were held on July 16 at the Mississauga Sports Centre.

== Schedule ==
All times are Eastern Daylight Time (UTC-4).

| Date | Time | Round |
|---|---|---|
| July 16, 2015 | 15:29 | Quarterfinals |
| July 16, 2015 | 16:59 | Semifinals |
| July 16, 2015 | 20:32 | Bronze medal matches |
| July 16, 2015 | 20:50 | Final |

== Results ==
Legend

- F — Won by fall
- WO - Won by Walkover

=== Final ===
| Quarterfinals | | Semifinals | | Finals |
| Luciano del Rio (ARG) | 5 |
| Josue Encarnación (DOM) | 6 | Josue Encarnación (DOM) | 3 |
| Andrés Ayub (CHI) | 10 | Andrés Ayub (CHI) | 3 |
| Charles Thoms (CAN) | 2 | | | Andrés Ayub (CHI) | 0 |
| Edgardo Lopez (PUR) | 0 | | | Mijaín López (CUB) | 8 |
| Robby Smith (USA) | 4^{F} | Robby Smith (USA) | 0 |
| Mijaín López (CUB) | 9 | Mijaín López (CUB) | 8 |
| Moisés Pérez (VEN) | 0 |

=== Repechage ===
Bronze medal match
Charles Thoms (CAN) | 0
Josue Encarnación (DOM) | 2
Moisés Pérez (VEN)
Robby Smith (USA) | WO
