= Kim Min-seok (wrestler) =

South Korean Greco-Roman wrestler

Personal information
- Native name: 김민석
- Born: 9 February 1993 (age 33)

Sport
- Country: South Korea
- Sport: Amateur wrestling
- Weight class: 130 kg
- Event: Greco-Roman
Medal record
Men's Greco-Roman wrestling
Representing South Korea
World Championships
Bronze medal – third place	2018 Budapest	130 kg
Asian Games
Bronze medal – third place	2018 Jakarta	130 kg
Bronze medal – third place	2022 Hangzhou	130 kg
Bronze medal – third place	2026 Aichi-Nagoya	130 kg
Asian Championships
Silver medal – second place	2020 New Delhi	130 kg
Silver medal – second place	2022 Ulaanbaatar	130 kg
Silver medal – second place	2024 Bishkek	130 kg
Bronze medal – third place	2017 New Delhi	130 kg
Bronze medal – third place	2026 Bishkek	130 kg
Grand Prix
Gold medal – first place	2026 Ulaanbaatar	130 kg
Ranking Series
Bronze medal – third place	2019 Oleg Karavaev, Belarus	130 kg
Bronze medal – third place	2019 Matteo Pellicone, Italy	130 kg

Kim Min-seok (born 9 February 1993) is a South Korean Greco-Roman wrestler. He won one of the bronze medals in the 130 kg event at the 2018 World Wrestling Championships held in Budapest, Hungary. In 2018, he also won one of the bronze medals in the 130 kg event at the Asian Games held in Jakarta, Indonesia.

== Career ==
Kim competed in the 130 kg event at the 2017 World Wrestling Championships held in Paris, France where he was eliminated in his first match.

In 2020, Kim won the silver medal in the 130 kg event at the Asian Wrestling Championships held in New Delhi, India.

In 2021, Kim competed in the men's 130 kg event at the 2020 Summer Olympics held in Tokyo, Japan.

He won the silver medal in his event at the 2022 Asian Wrestling Championships held in Ulaanbaatar, Mongolia. He competed in the 130 kg event at the 2022 World Wrestling Championships held in Belgrade, Serbia.

Kim won one of the bronze medals in the 130 kg event at the 2022 Asian Games held in Hangzhou, China. In 2024, he won the silver medal in his event at the Asian Wrestling Championships held in Bishkek, Kyrgyzstan.

== Achievements ==
Year	Competition	Venue	Position	Event	Notes
Representing South Korea
2017	Asian Championships	New Delhi, India	3rd	Greco-Roman 130 kg	
2018	Asian Games	Jakarta, Indonesia	3rd	Greco-Roman 130 kg	
2018	World Championships	Budapest, Hungary	3rd	Greco-Roman 130 kg	
2020	Asian Championships	New Delhi, India	2nd	Greco-Roman 130 kg	
2022	Asian Championships	Ulaanbaatar, Mongolia	2nd	Greco-Roman 130 kg	
