= Andrés Ayub =

Chilean Greco-Roman wrestler

Personal information
- Full name: Andrés Antonio Ayub Valenzuela
- Born: 1 January 1982 (age 44) Santiago, Chile
- Height: 1.91 m (6 ft 3 in)
- Weight: 120 kg (265 lb)

Sport
- Style: Greco-Roman
- Coach: Eugenio Deultelmoser
Medal record
Men's Greco-Roman wrestling
Representing Chile
Pan American Games
Silver medal – second place	2015 Toronto	-130 kg

Andrés Antonio Ayub Valenzuela (Note: In this Spanish name, the first or paternal surname is Ayub and the second or maternal family name is Valenzuela.) (born 1 January 1982) is an amateur Chilean Greco-Roman wrestler, who competes in the men's super heavyweight category.

Ayub became the first Chilean wrestler in history to compete at the Summer Olympics at the 2012 Summer Olympics in London. He qualified for the men's 120 kg class, after placing second from the Pan American Qualification Tournament in Kissimmee, Florida. He received a bye through to his round of sixteen match, before losing out to Georgia's Guram Pherselidze, who was able to score four points in two straight periods, leaving Ayub without a single point.

He won a silver medal at the 2015 Pan American Games in the Men's Greco-Roman 130 kg event.
