= Eduard Soghomonyan =

Armenian-born Brazilian wrestler

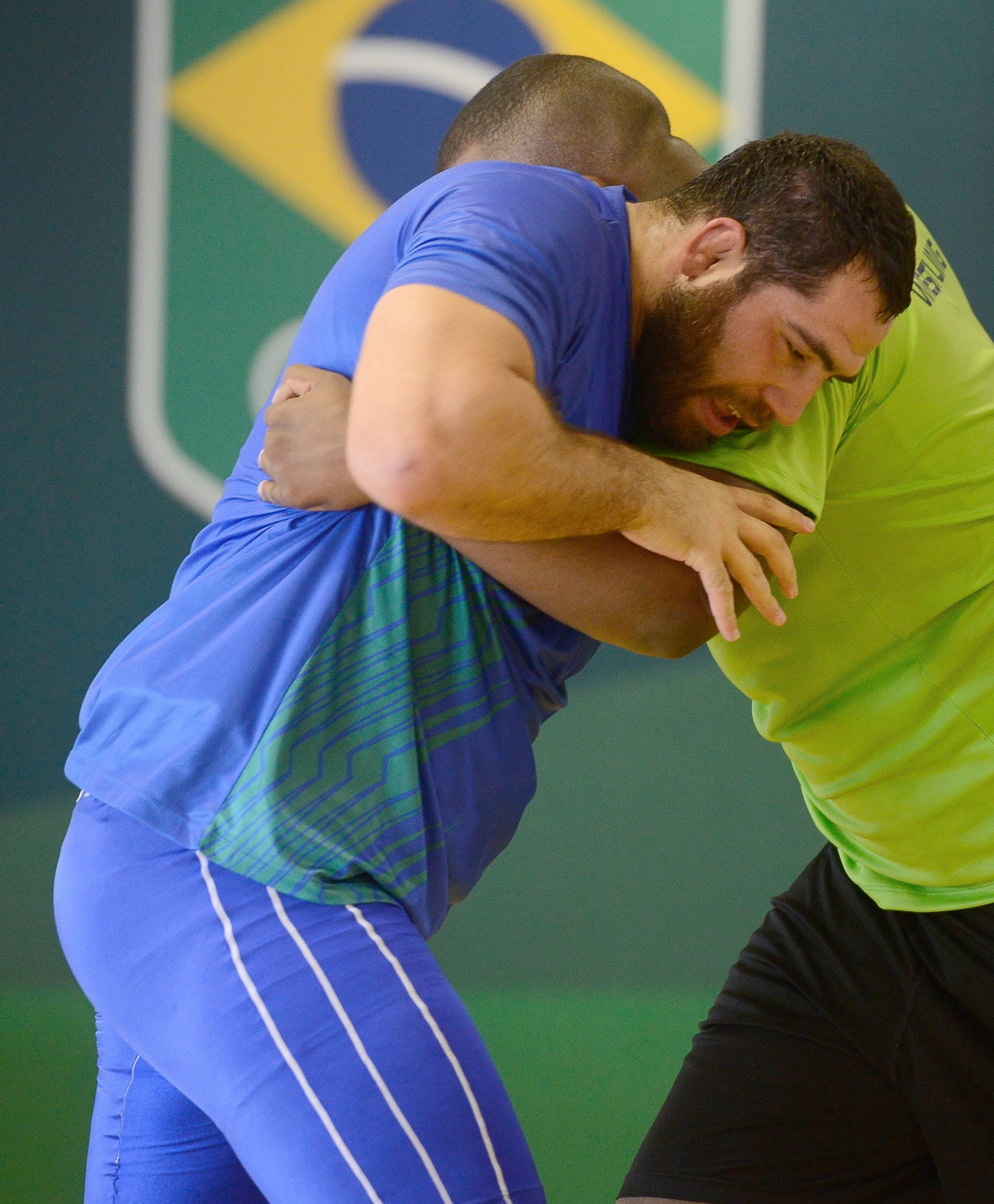
- Soghomonyan in 2016

Personal information
- Born: 19 February 1990 (age 36) Yerevan, Armenian SSR, Soviet Union (now Yerevan, Armenia)
- Height: 190 cm (6 ft 3 in)
- Weight: 125 kg (276 lb)

Sport
- Sport: Greco-Roman wrestling
- Club: Centro Olímpico
- Coached by: Ángel Torres, Eduard Sahaguan, Jean-Louis Maren
Medal record
Men's Greco-Roman wrestling
Representing Brazil
Pan American Championships
Silver medal – second place	2016 Frisco	130 kg
Silver medal – second place	2022 Acapulco	130 kg
Bronze medal – third place	2023 B.Aires	130 kg

Eduard Soghomonyan (born 19 February 1990) is an Armenian-born heavyweight Greco-Roman wrestler. He has competed for Brazil since 2015 and was naturalized as a Brazilian in 2016.

== Career ==
The fighter arrived in São Paulo in 2012 after making friends with members of the Brazilian delegation, accompanied by him during the Pan-Armenian Games a year earlier. Eduard has competed for Brazil since 2015, but using a so-called sports passport.

At the 2015 World Wrestling Championships held in Las Vegas, USA, he won his first fight but lost in the round of 16.

Soghomonyan represented Brazil at the 2015 South American Wrestling Championships, held in Buenos Aires, Argentina, in November, and won his first gold medal for the country in the 130 kg category.

At the 2016 Pan American Wrestling Championships held in Frisco, USA, he won the silver medal in the 130 kg category. He faced Cuban Oscar Pino Hunds in the final, after beating Venezuelan Erwin Cabrera, Honduran Randy Martinez and North American Toby Ericson. In a disputed decision, the Cuban won the first round 2-0 and Eduard had to take a risk with just 10 seconds remaining. Oscar counterattacked, got the stoppage and the gold medal.

In June 2016, he was naturalized as a Brazilian citizen. Thus, he was able to defend Brazil at the Rio Olympic Games in August.

He competed for Brazil at the 2016 Summer Olympics, but was eliminated in the first bout.

He represented Brazil at the 2020 Summer Olympics held in Tokyo, Japan. He competed in the men's 130 kg event.

He won the silver medal in his event at the 2022 Pan American Wrestling Championships held in Acapulco, Mexico.

He competed in the 130 kg event at the 2022 World Wrestling Championships held in Belgrade, Serbia, where he won the first fight but was eliminated in the round of 16.

At the 2023 Pan American Wrestling Championships, he obtained a bronze medal in the 130 kg category.

At the 2023 Pan American Games, he reached the bronze medal fight, but did not win the medal, finishing in 5th place. He competed at the 2024 Pan American Wrestling Olympic Qualification Tournament held in Acapulco, Mexico hoping to qualify for the 2024 Summer Olympics in Paris, France. He was eliminated in the semifinals by Yasmani Acosta of Chile.

In October 9, 2026 he will have his first Power Slap match in Power Slap 24

https://armeniansportsnews.com/2026/09/27/eduard-soghomonyan-shifts-from-olympic-wrestling-to-power-slap-debut/
