= Konsta Mäenpää =

Finnish Greco-Roman wrestler

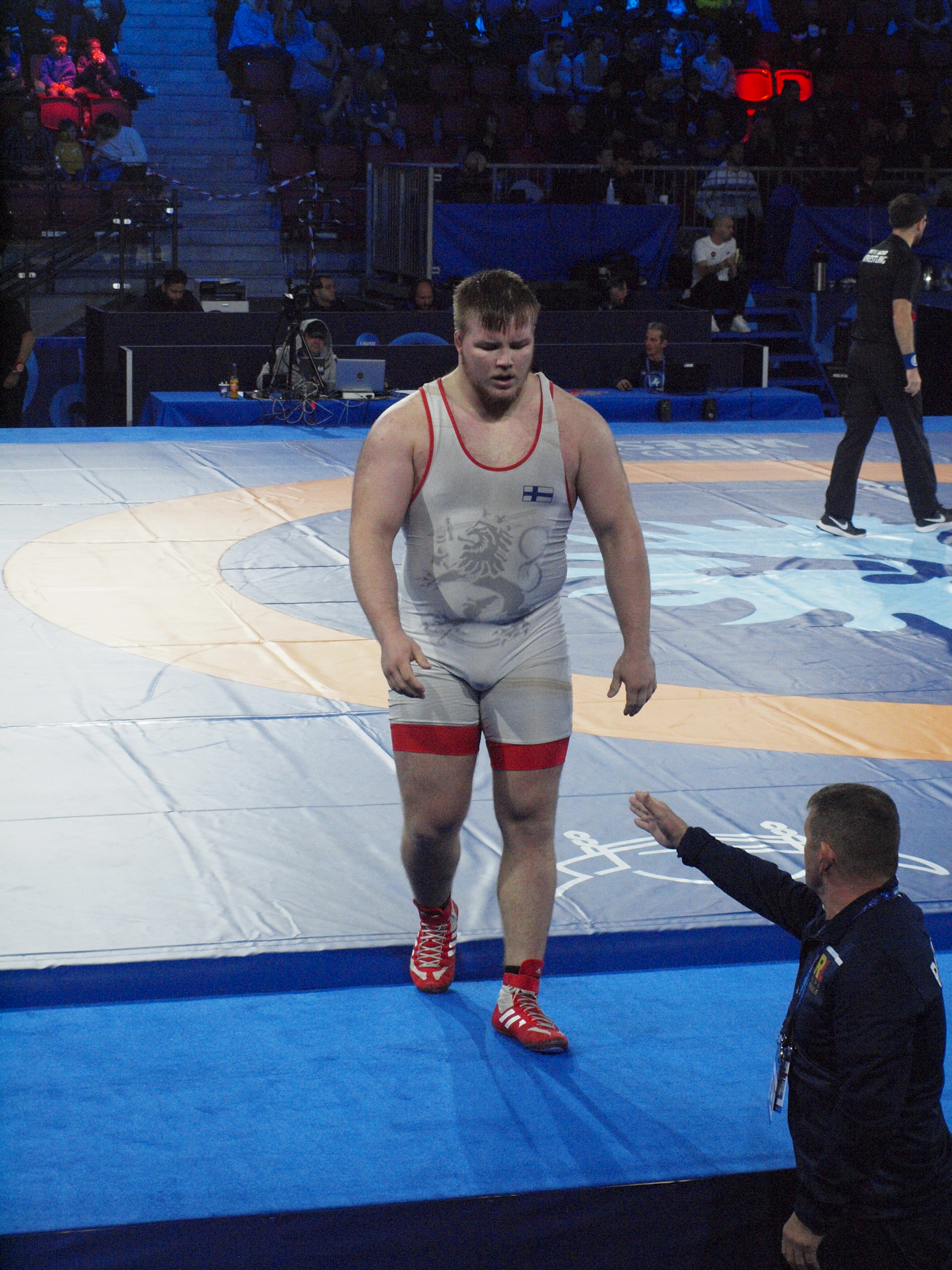

Personal information
- Full name: Konsta Johannes Mäenpää
- Born: 23 October 1997 (age 29) South Ostrobothnia, Finland
- Height: 1.83 m (6 ft 0 in)
- Weight: 130 kg (290 lb; 20 st)

Sport
- Country: Finland
- Sport: Greco-Roman
- Event: 130 kg
Medal record
Men's Greco-Roman wrestling
Representing Finland
European Championships
Bronze medal – third place	2022 Budapest	130 kg
Dan Kolov - Nikola Petrov Tournament
Silver medal – second place	2023 Sofia	130 kg
Grand Prix
Silver medal – second place	2025 Zagreb	130 kg
Silver medal – second place	2026 Tirana	130 kg
Bronze medal – third place	2022 Zagreb	130 kg
World Juniors Championships
Bronze medal – third place	2017 Tampere	120 kg
European Juniors Championships
Bronze medal – third place	2017 Rome	120 kg

Konsta Mäenpää (born 23 October 1997) is a Finnish Greco-Roman wrestler competing in the 130 kg division.

== Career ==
Konsta Mäenpää's father is Juha Mäenpää, Member of Parliament.

Mäenpää finished seventh in the 96 kg category at the European Youth Championships in 2016. He achieved World Youth Championship bronze in the 120 kg weight category in 2017. He finished fifth in the under-23 World Championships in the 130 kg category in 2018 and 2019. He won the Nordic Youth Championship in the 120 kg category in 2017.

Mäenpää won the European bronze medal in the 130 kg category in Budapest 2022, beating Franz Richter of Germany in the bronze medal match.

== Achievements ==
Year	Tournament	Location	Result	Event
2022	European Championships	Budapest, Hungary	3rd	Greco-Roman 130 kg
