= Dárius Vitek =

Hungarian Greco-Roman wrestler

Personal information
- Full name: Dárius Attila Vitek
- Born: 23 October 1999 (age 27) Budapest, Hungary
- Height: 1.80 m (5 ft 11 in)
- Weight: 130 kg (290 lb; 20 st)

Sport
- Country: Hungary
- Sport: Greco-Roman
- Event: 130 kg
Medal record
Men's Greco-Roman wrestling
Representing Hungary
World Championships
Silver medal – second place	2025 Zagreb	130 kg
Silver medal – second place	2026 Astana	130 kg
European Championships
Bronze medal – third place	2022 Budapest	130 kg
Bronze medal – third place	2025 Bratislava	130 kg
Grand Prix
Silver medal – second place	2025 Budapest	130 kg
Bronze medal – third place	2024 Zagreb	130 kg
Bronze medal – third place	2024 Budapest	130 kg
Vehbi Emre & Hamit Kaplan Tournament
Gold medal – first place	2025 Kocaeli	130 kg
Dan Kolov & Nikola Petrov Tournament
Bronze medal – third place	2022 Veliko Tarnovo	130 kg
World U23 Championships
Bronze medal – third place	2021 Belgrade	130 kg
Bronze medal – third place	2022 Pontevedra	130 kg
European U23 Championship
Gold medal – first place	2022 Plovdiv	130 kg
Bronze medal – third place	2021 Skopje	130 kg
World Juniors Championships
Bronze medal – third place	2019 Tallinn	130 kg

Dárius Vitek (born 23 October 1999) is a Hungarian Greco-Roman wrestler competing in the 130 kg division.

== Career ==
He won a bronze medal by defeating Georgian Beka Kandelaki, who competed for Azerbaijan, 4–1 in the third place match of the 2022 European Wrestling Championships in Budapest, Hungary in the 130 kg category. He drew 1–1 with Fatih Bozkurt in the final match of the 2022 European U23 Wrestling Championships in Filipe, Bulgaria, and won the gold medal by beating his opponent from the last point advantage.

Dárius Vitek won the bronze medal at the 2022 World U23 Wrestling Championships in Pontevedra, Spain, with a 12-2 technical superiority over his Greek opponent Nikolaos Ntounias in the third place match.

He competed at the 2024 European Wrestling Olympic Qualification Tournament in Baku, Azerbaijan hoping to qualify for the 2024 Summer Olympics in Paris, France. He was eliminated in his first match and he did not qualify for the Olympics. He also competed at the 2024 World Wrestling Olympic Qualification Tournament held in Istanbul, Turkey without qualifying for the Olympics.

== Achievements ==
Year	Tournament	Location	Result	Event
2022	European Championships	Budapest, Hungary	3rd	Greco-Roman 130 kg
2025	European Championships	Bratislava, Slovakia	3rd	Greco-Roman 130 kg
2025	World Championships	Zagreb, Croatia	2nd	Greco-Roman 130 kg
