= Muminjon Abdullaev =

Uzbekistani Greco-Roman wrestler

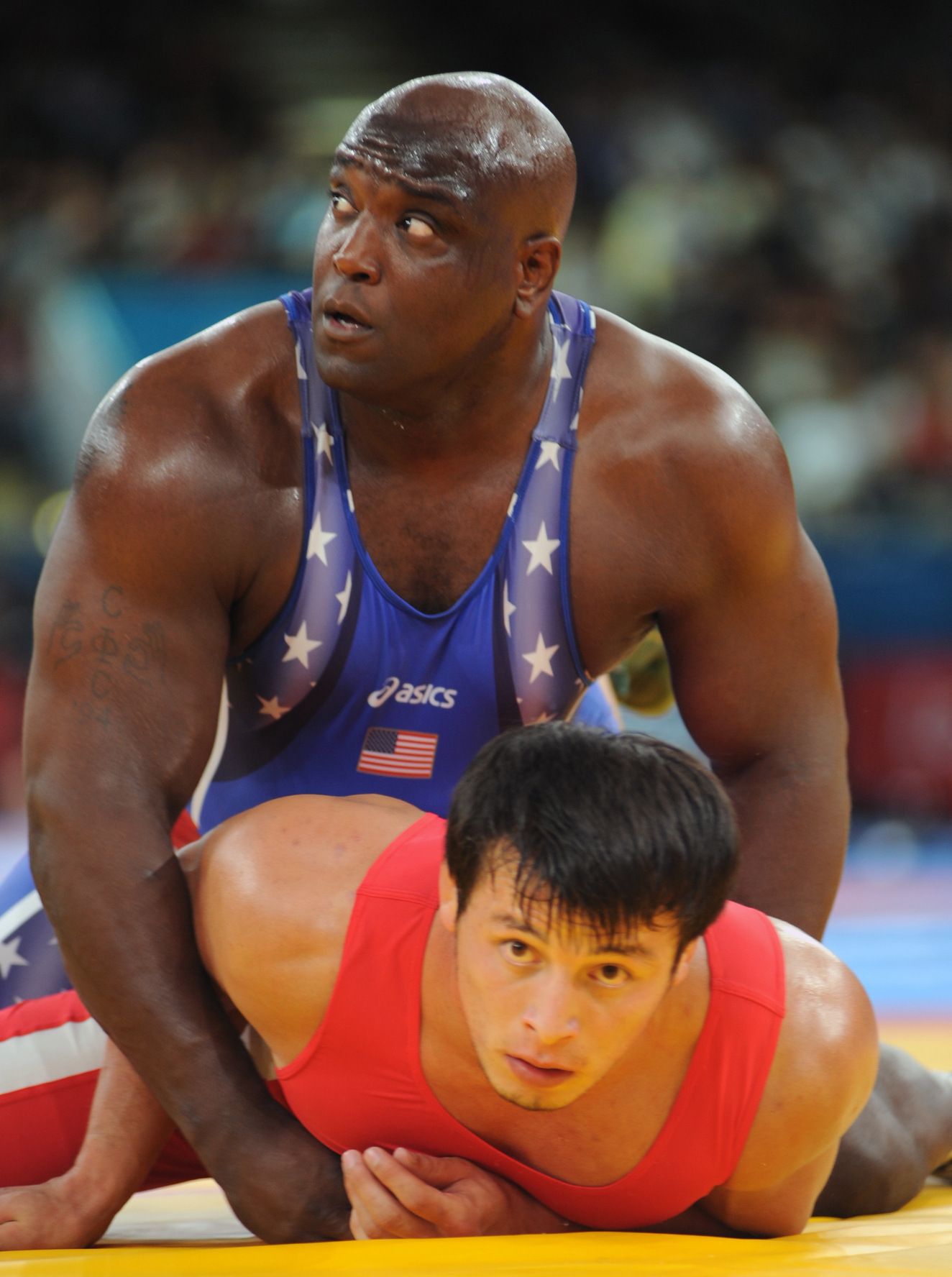
- Abdullaev (below) and Dremiel Byers (top) at the 2012 Summer Olympics

Personal information
- Native name: Муминжон Абдуллаев
- Nationality: Uzbekistan
- Born: 24 December 1989 (age 36) Samarqand Province, Uzbek SSR, Soviet Union
- Height: 1.87 m (6 ft 2 in)

Sport
- Country: Uzbekistan
- Sport: Greco-Roman wrestling
- Weight class: 130 kg
- Club: Batir, Tashkent
- Coached by: Hakim Nakibov
Medal record
Representing Uzbekistan
Asian Games
Gold medal – first place	2018 Jakarta	130 kg
Asian Championships
Silver medal – second place	2018 Bishkek	130 kg
Bronze medal – third place	2022 Ulaanbaatar	130 kg
Bronze medal – third place	2017 New Delhi	130 kg
Bronze medal – third place	2010 New Delhi	96 kg
Asian Indoor Games
Silver medal – second place	2017 Ashgabat	130 kg
Islamic Solidarity Games
Silver medal – second place	2017 Baku	130 kg

Muminjon Abdullaev (born 24 December 1989) is an Uzbekistani Greco-Roman wrestler.

== Career ==
He who won a bronze medal at the 2010 Asian Wrestling Championships in the 96 kg division. He competed in the 120 kg event at the 2012 Summer Olympics and was eliminated in the 1/8 finals by Dremiel Byers.

Later in 2012 Abdullaev tested positive for nandrolone, an anabolic steroid, and was banned for two years until 20 November 2014.

In 2021, he competed in the men's 130 kg event at the 2020 Summer Olympics held in Tokyo, Japan.

In 2022, he won one of the bronze medals in his event at the Vehbi Emre & Hamit Kaplan Tournament held in Istanbul, Turkey. He lost his bronze medal match in the 130 kg event at the 2022 World Wrestling Championships held in Belgrade, Serbia.
