= Arata Sonoda =

Japanese Greco-Roman wrestler

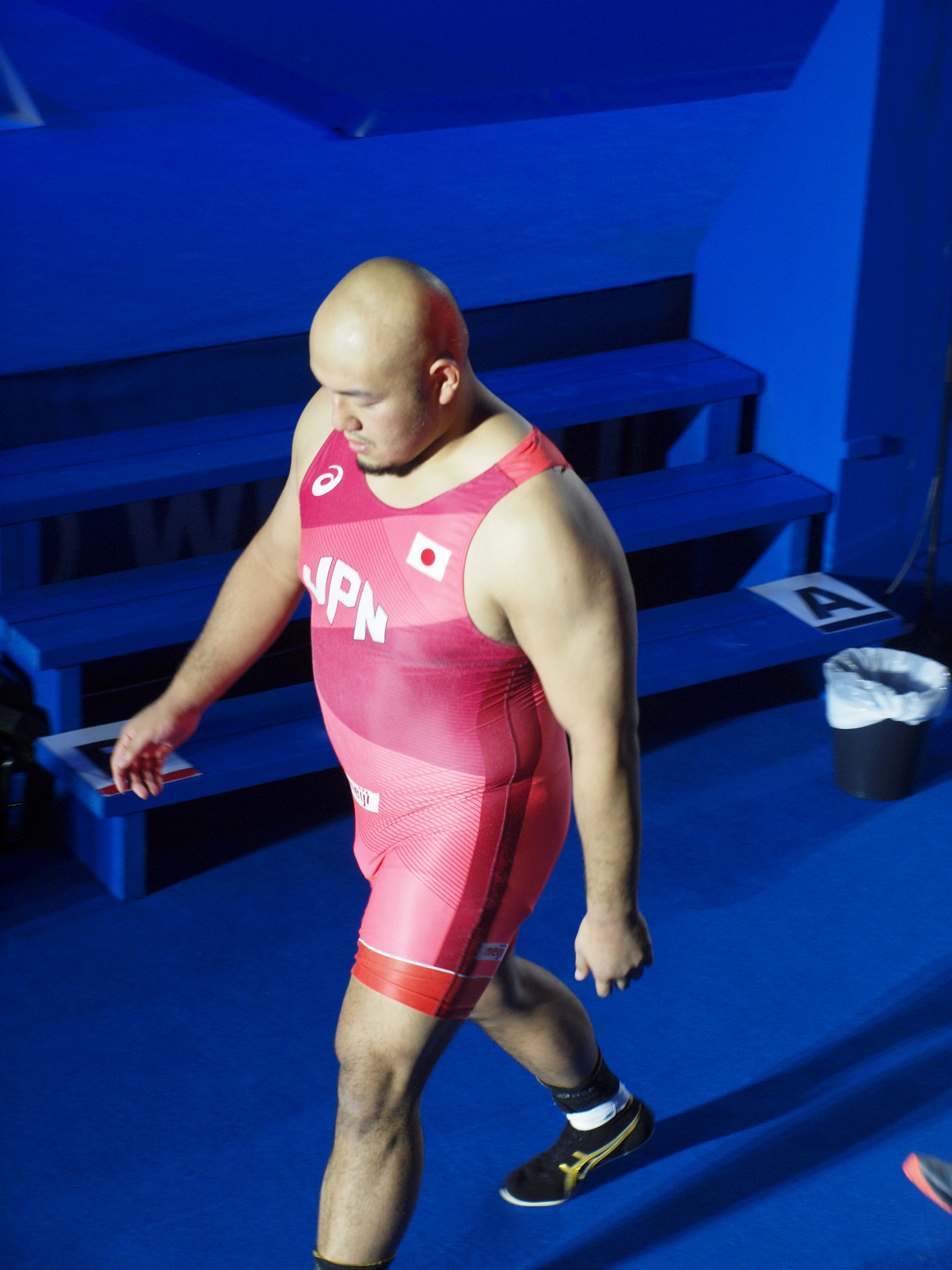
- Arata Sonoda at the 2021 World Wrestling Championships in Oslo, Norway

Personal information
- Born: 5 July 1994 (age 32)
- Height: 186 cm (6 ft 1 in)

Sport
- Country: Japan
- Sport: Amateur wrestling
- Weight class: 130 kg
- Event: Greco-Roman
Medal record
Men's Greco-Roman wrestling
Representing Japan
Asian Games
| Bronze medal – third place | 2018 Jakarta | 130 kg |

Arata Sonoda (born 5 July 1994) is a Japanese Greco-Roman wrestler. He won one of the bronze medals in the 130 kg event at the 2018 Asian Games held in Jakarta, Indonesia.

== Career ==
In 2014, he competed in the 130 kg event at the World Wrestling Championships where he was eliminated in his first match by Bilyal Makhov of Russia. The following year, he competed again in the 130 kg event with the same result; he was eliminated from the competition in his first match, this time against Lukas Hörmann.

In 2017, he competed in the 130 kg event at the World Wrestling Championships held in Paris, France where he lost his only match against Levan Arabuli. In 2018, he was also eliminated in his first match and the same thing happened in the 130 kg event in 2019.

In 2020, he competed at the 2020 Asian Wrestling Championships held in New Delhi, India where he lost his bronze medal match against Mansur Shadukayev. In April 2021, he competed at the Asian Olympic Qualification Tournament hoping to qualify for the 2020 Summer Olympics in Tokyo, Japan. He did not qualify at this tournament and, in May 2021, he also failed to qualify for the Olympics at the World Olympic Qualification Tournament held in Sofia, Bulgaria.

He competed in the 130 kg event at the 2022 World Wrestling Championships held in Belgrade, Serbia.

== Achievements ==
| Year | Tournament | Location | Result | Event |
|---|---|---|---|---|
| 2018 | Asian Games | Jakarta, Indonesia | 3rd | Greco-Roman 130 kg |
