= Nurmakhan Tinaliyev =

Kazakhstani sport wrestler

Nurmankhan Tinaliyev
- Born: 10 January 1988 (age 38); Alma-ata, Kazakh SSR, Soviet Union
- Height: 1.97 m (6.5 ft)

Nurmakhan Tinaliyev
Medal record

Men's Greco-Roman wrestling

Representing Kazakhstan

World Championships
Bronze medal – third place	2010 Moscow	120 kg
Bronze medal – third place	2011 Istanbul	120 kg
Bronze medal – third place	2013 Budapest	120 kg

Asian Games
Gold medal – first place	2010 Guangzhou	120 kg
Gold medal – first place	2014 Incheon	130 kg
Silver medal – second place	2018 Jakarta	130 kg

Asian Championships
Gold medal – first place	2015 Doha	130 kg
Gold medal – first place	2013 New Delhi	130 kg

Nurmakhan Tinaliyev (born 10 January 1988) is a male wrestler from Kazakhstan. He was flag bearer at the 2012 Summer Olympics.

Olympic Games
Preceded by Dias Keneshev	Flagbearer for Kazakhstan; London 2012	Succeeded by Yerdos Akhmadiyev
