= Alimkhan Syzdykov =

Kazakhstani Greco-Roman wrestler

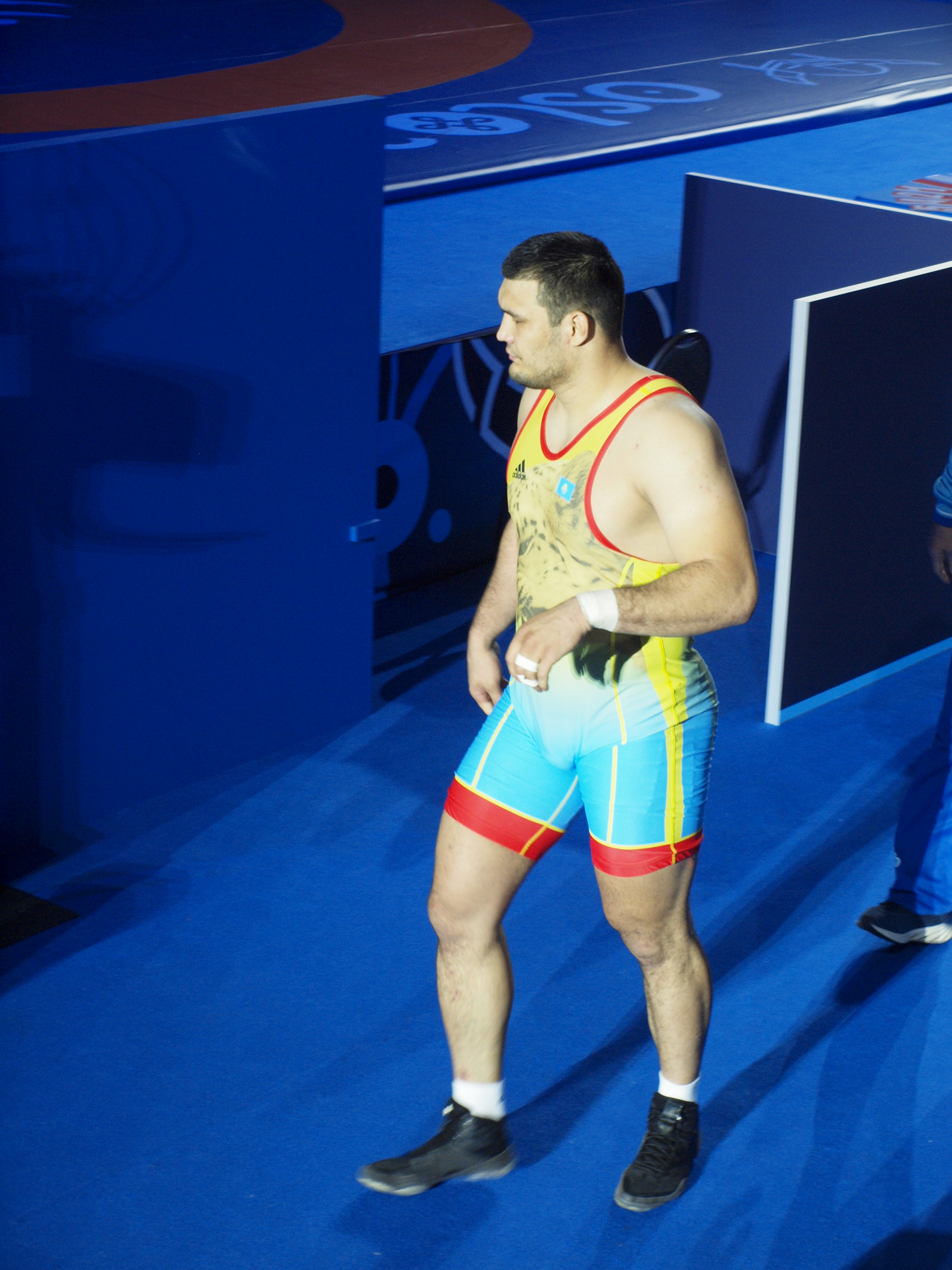

Personal information
- Born: 14 June 1994 (age 32) Kazakhstan
- Height: 1.92 m (6 ft 4 in)
- Weight: 130 kg (287 lb)

Sport
- Country: Kazakhstan
- Sport: Amateur wrestling
- Event: Greco-Roman
- Coached by: Besolt Deziev
Medal record
Men's Greco-Roman wrestling
Representing Kazakhstan
Asian Championships
Gold medal – first place	2022 Ulaanbaatar	130 kg
Silver medal – second place	2021 Almaty	130 kg
Silver medal – second place	2025 Amman	130 kg
Bronze medal – third place	2023 Astana	130 kg
Asian Games
Bronze medal – third place	2022 Hangzhou	130 kg
World Military Championships
Gold medal – first place	2024 Yerevan	130 kg
Vehbi Emre & Hamit Kaplan Tournament
Bronze medal – third place	2016 Istanbul	98 kg
Grand Prix
Silver medal – second place	2015 Semey	98 kg
Silver medal – second place	2022 Bucharest	130 kg
Bronze medal – third place	2018 Alma Ata	97 kg
Bronze medal – third place	2023 Alexandria	130 kg
Bronze medal – third place	2023 Dortmund	130 kg
Bronze medal – third place	2025 Budapest	130 kg
Asian Juniors Championships
Silver medal – second place	2014 Ulaanbaatar	96 kg

Alimkhan Syzdykov (born 14 June 1994) is a Kazakh Greco-Roman wrestler competing in the 130 kg division.

== Career ==
Asian Games bronze medallist in 2022. Asian champion in 2022; second in 2021; third in 2023. Fourth in the 2016 World Cup and seventh in 2017. Asian junior runner-up in 2014.

On 9 April 2023 in Astana, defeating Kim Min-seok from South Korea in the bout for 3rd place, he won the bronze medal of the Asian Championships.

He competed at the 2024 Asian Wrestling Olympic Qualification Tournament in Bishkek, Kyrgyzstan and he earned a quota place for Kazakhstan for the 2024 Summer Olympics in Paris, France. He competed in the 130 kg event at the Olympics.
