= Hamza Bakır =

Turkish Greco-Roman wrestler (born 2001)

Personal information
- Nationality: Turkish
- Born: 20 January 2001 (age 25) Istanbul, Turkey

Sport
- Country: Turkey
- Sport: Wrestling
- Weight class: 130 kg
- Event: Greco-Roman
- Club: Ankara ASKİ
Medal record
Men's Greco-Roman
Representing Turkey
European Championships
Silver medal – second place	2025 Bratislava	130 kg
World U23 Championships
Gold medal – first place	2023 Tirana	130 kg
European U23 Championships
Bronze medal – third place	2023 Bucharest	130 kg
Bronze medal – third place	2024 Baku	130 kg

Muhammet Hamza Bakır (born 20 January 2001) is a Turkish Greco-Roman wrestler competing in the 130 kg category. He won the silver medal at the 2025 European Wrestling Championships and the gold medal at the 2023 World U23 Wrestling Championships, and represented Turkey at the 2024 Summer Olympics.

== Career ==
Bakır won the European and world cadet titles in 2018 and the European junior title in 2019, adding a bronze at the 2019 World Junior Championships. In 2020 he beat the 2019 world champion Heiki Nabi at the Pytlasinski tournament, and in 2021 he won both the European junior and the world junior titles at 130 kg.

After a bronze at the 2023 European U23 Championships, Bakır won the 2023 World U23 title in Tirana by beating Mykhailo Vyshnyvetskyi in the final, and took another European U23 bronze in 2024.

He competed in the 130 kg Greco-Roman event at the 2024 Summer Olympics in Paris, losing his opening bout to Abdellatif Mohamed of Egypt and finishing 14th. At the 2025 European Championships in Bratislava he reached the final, where he lost to Sergey Semyonov on the last-point criterion after a 1–1 tie, taking silver.

He won a bronze at the 2026 Vehbi Emre & Hamit Kaplan Tournament in Antalya.

== Personal life ==
His father Fatih Bakır and his brother Cemal Yusuf Bakır are also Greco-Roman wrestlers. He graduated from Istanbul Aydın University.
