= Meng Lingzhe =

Chinese Greco-Roman wrestler

Personal information
- Native name: 孟令哲
- Nationality: China
- Born: 16 April 1998 (age 28) Dingtao District, Heze, Shandong, China
- Education: Shandong Sport University
- Height: 190 cm (6 ft 3 in)
- Weight: 130 kg (287 lb)

Sport
- Country: China
- Sport: Amateur wrestling
- Weight class: 130 kg
- Event: Greco-Roman
Medal record
Men's Greco-Roman wrestling
Representing China
Olympic Games
Bronze medal – third place	2024 Paris	130 kg
Asian Games
Silver medal – second place	2022 Hangzhou	130 kg
Bronze medal – third place	2026 Aichi-Nagoya	130 kg
Asian Championships
Silver medal – second place	2023 Astana	130 kg
Bronze medal – third place	2024 Bishkek	130 kg
Grand Prix
Silver medal – second place	2024 Zagreb	130 kg
Bronze medal – third place	2023 Zagreb	130 kg
Bronze medal – third place	2020 Rome	130 kg
Silver medal – second place	2018 Gyoer	130 kg
Bronze medal – third place	2016 Paris	98 kg
Poland Open
Silver medal – second place	2022 Warsaw	130 kg
Silver medal – second place	2019 Warsaw	130 kg
National Games of China
Bronze medal – third place	2021 Shaanxi	130 kg
Bronze medal – third place	2017 Tianjin	98 kg

Meng Lingzhe (born 16 April 1998) is a Chinese Greco-Roman wrestler. He won one of the bronze medals in the 130 kg event at the 2024 Summer Olympics in Paris, France.

== Background ==
Meng was born on 16 April 1998, in Dingtao District, Heze, Shandong. When he was four years old, he started training in martial arts.

When Meng was six years old, his talent was discovered by a coach and was taken to Heze City Sports School to train in wrestling.

In December 2009, Meng went to the provincial team for training and soon became part of it.

In September 2014, Meng became part of the national Greco-Roman wrestling team for China.

== Career ==
Meng's first success in international competition at senior level came in January 2016 where he won a bronze medal at the 2016 Paris Grand Prix.

In September 2017, Meng competed at the 98 kg event of Greco-Roman wrestling at the 2017 National Games of China in Tianjin where he won a bronze medal.

In 2018, Meng moved up in weight class to compete at 130 kg. In June that year, he won a silver medal at the Hungary Grand Prix losing to Nurmakhan Tinaliyev in the final.

In April 2021, Meng participated in the 2021 Asian Wrestling Olympic Qualification Tournament. However he came third place and missed out competing in the 2020 Summer Olympics.

In September 2021, Meng competed at the 130 kg event of Greco-Roman wrestling at the 2021 National Games of China in Shaanxi where he won a bronze medal.

In April 2023, Meng competed at the 2023 Asian Wrestling Championships where got a silver medal after losing to Amin Mirzazadeh in the finals.

In September 2023, Meng competed at the 2023 World Wrestling Championships. He lost the bronze medal bout to Abdellatif Mohamed and came fifth overall. However he defeated Romas Fridrikas from Lithuania in the Olympic wrestle-off which secured him a spot at the 2024 Summer Olympics in Paris, France.

In October 2023, Meng competed at the 2022 Asian Games where got a silver medal after losing to Mirzazadeh again in the finals. In April 2024, he won one of the bronze medals in his event at the Asian Wrestling Championships held in Bishkek, Kyrgyzstan. In August 2024, he won one of the bronze medals in the 130 kg event at the Summer Olympics. He defeated Abdellatif Mohamed of Egypt in his bronze medal match.
