= Abdellatif Mohamed =

Egyptian Greco-Roman wrestler

Personal information
- Full name: Abdellatif Mohamed Ahmed Mohamed
- Born: 8 December 1995 (age 30) Dakahlia, Egypt
- Height: 1.92 m (6 ft 4 in)
- Weight: 130 kg (287 lb)

Sport
- Country: Egypt
- Sport: Greco-Roman wrestling
Medal record
Men's Greco-Roman wrestling
Representing Egypt
World Championships
Bronze medal – third place	2023 Belgrade	130 kg
African Championships
Gold medal – first place	2015 Alexandria	130 kg
Gold medal – first place	2016 Alexandria	130 kg
Gold medal – first place	2017 Marrakesh	130 kg
Gold medal – first place	2019 Hammamet	130 kg
Gold medal – first place	2020 Algiers	130 kg
Gold medal – first place	2022 El Jadida	130 kg
Gold medal – first place	2023 Hammamet	130 kg
Gold medal – first place	2024 Alexandria	130 kg
Gold medal – first place	2025 Casablanca	130 kg
African Games
Gold medal – first place	2015 Brazzaville	130 kg
Gold medal – first place	2019 Rabat	130 kg
Gold medal – first place	2023 Accra	130 kg
Military World Games
Bronze medal – third place	2019 Wuhan	130 kg
Islamic Solidarity Games
Silver medal – second place	2025 Riyadh	130 kg
Mediterranean Games
Silver medal – second place	2022 Oran	130 kg
Grand Prix
Gold medal – first place	2020 Rome	130 kg
Silver medal – second place	2019 Minsk	130 kg
Silver medal – second place	2019 Russe	130 kg
Silver medal – second place	2021 Rome	130 kg
World U23 Championships
Bronze medal – third place	2018 Bucharest	130 kg

Abdellatif Mohamed (Arabic: عبد اللطيف محمد, born 8 December 1995) is an Egyptian Greco-Roman wrestler. He competed in the men's Greco-Roman 130 kg event at the 2016 Summer Olympics, in which he was eliminated in the round of 32 by Oleksandr Chernetskyi.

In 2021, he competed in the men's 130 kg event at the 2020 Summer Olympics held in Tokyo, Japan.

He won the gold medal in his event at the 2022 African Wrestling Championships held in El Jadida, Morocco. He won the silver medal in the 130 kg event at the 2022 Mediterranean Games held in Oran, Algeria. He competed in the 130 kg event at the 2022 World Wrestling Championships held in Belgrade, Serbia.

He lost his bronze medal match in the 130 kg event at the 2024 Summer Olympics in Paris, France.
