= Jello Krahmer =

German Greco-Roman wrestler

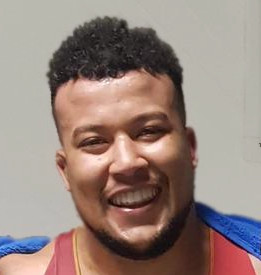
- Jello Krahmer (2020)

Personal information
- Nationality: German
- Born: 19 November 1995 (age 30) Stuttgart, Germany
- Height: 1.92 m (6 ft 4 in)
- Weight: 125 kg (276 lb)

Sport
- Country: Germany
- Sport: Wrestling
- Event: Greco-Roman
- Club: ASV Schorndorf
- Coached by: Sedat Sevsay
Medal record
Men's Greco-Roman wrestling
Representing Germany
European Championships
Bronze medal – third place	2020 Rome	130 kg
Bronze medal – third place	2025 Bratislava	130 kg
World U23 Championships
Bronze medal – third place	2017 Bydgoszcz	130 kg

Jello Krahmer (born 19 November 1995 in Stuttgart) is a heavy weight German Greco-Roman wrestler. He won the Thor Masters tournament in 2020 and is the bronze medal winner of the 2020 European Wrestling Championships in his weight class. Krahmer trains at ASV Schorndorf in Schorndorf, Germany, coached by Sedat Sevsay.

== Career ==
Jello Krahmer was born in 1995 in Hedelfingen near Stuttgart (Germany) and was raised in Lorch (Württemberg). When he was a schoolboy, his mother introduced him to wrestling in Schorndorf.

In spring 2017, during his second appearance at the European championships, in the Hungarian city of Szombathely, he came within a whisker of the bronze medal. At the Juniors World Wrestling Championships in the same year in Bydgoszcz he sensationally won it. He was second in the German Championships in 2019 and won the "Thor Masters" tournament in Nykøbing Falster in 2020 which earned him the nomination for the 2020 European Wrestling Championships in Rome. There he made a dream come true in winning his first medal at an international senior's championships. Krahmer competed at the 2024 European Wrestling Olympic Qualification Tournament where he earned a quota place for Germany at the 2024 Summer Olympics in men's 130 kg Greco-Roman wrestling. He competed in the 130 kg event at the Olympics.

After successfully completing his studies in International Sales Management and Technology at Aalen University at the end of 2019, Krahmer is currently a member of the German military's sports promotion group.

== International achievements ==
Year	Rank	Competition	Weight class	Achievement
2015	14.	Junior-ECh in Istanbul	120 kg	Winner: Zviadi Pataridze (Georgia)
2015	7.	Junior-WCh in Salvador da Bahia	120 kg	Winner: Zviadi Pataridze (Georgia)
2016	7.	"Thor Masters" in Nykøbing Falster	130 kg	Winner: Eduard Popp (Germany)
2016	8.	Student-WCh in Çorum	130 kg	Winner: Bálint Lám (Hungary)
2017	6.	"Thor Masters" in Nykøbing Falster	130 kg	Winner: Robert Smith (USA)
2017	5.	U23 ECh in Szombathely	130 kg	Winner: Osman Yildirim (Turkey)
2017	3.	U23 WCh in Bydgoszcz	130 kg	behind Zviadi Pataridze (Georgia) and Sergey Semenov (Russian Federation)
2018	5.	"Thor Masters" in Nykøbing Falster	130 kg	Winner: Christian John (Germany)
2018	2.	"Kristjan Palusalu Memorial" in Tallinn	130 kg	Winner: Vitali Shchur (Russian Federation)
2018	8.	U23 ECh in Istanbul	130 kg	Winner: Zviadi Pataridze (Georgia)
2018	19.	Gran Prix of Germany in Dortmund	130 kg	Winner: Iakob Kajaia (Georgia)
2018	8.	U23 WCh in Bucharest	130 kg	Winner: Zviadi Pataridze (Georgia)
2019	8.	RS Grand Prix of Hungary in Gyoer	130 kg	Winner: Heiki Nabi (Estonia)
2019	9.	"Thor Masters" in Nykøbing Falster	130 kg	Winner: Christian John (Germany)
2019	12.	European Games in Minsk	130 kg	Winner: Iakob Kajaia (Georgia)
2019	7.	Gran Prix of Germany in Dortmund	130 kg	Winner: Konsta Johannes Maeenpaeae (Finland)
2020	1.	"Thor Masters" in Nykøbing Falster	130 kg	2nd Hamza Bakir (Turkey), 3rd Christian John (Germany)
2020	3.	ECh in Rome	130 kg	Gold: Alin Alexuc-Ciurariu (Romania), Silver: Levan Arabuli (Georgia)

- all competitions are held in Greco-Roman style of wrestling
- ECh – European Championships; WCh – World Championships
- 130 kg is the heavy weight class in UWW classification.

== German Championships ==
(only Senior)

Year	Place	Weight class	Comment
2015	5.	130 kg	Winner: Eduard Popp (VfL Neckargartach)
2016	3.	130 kg	Winner: Christian John (Eisenhüttenstädter RC)
2019	2.	130 kg	Winner: Eduard Popp (VfL Neckargartach)
