= List of Oirats =

This is a list of notable Oirats:

== Political figures ==
- Qutuqa Beki
- Al-Adil Kitbugha 10th Mamluk Sultan of Egypt from December 1294 to November 1296
- Vladimir Lenin
- Ilya Ulyanov
- Yumjaagiin Tsedenbal
- Jambyn Batmönkh

=== Leaders of Four Oirat ===
- Esen (1438–1454)
- Kharkhul (Unknown–1634)

=== Leaders of the Dzungar Khanate ===
- Erdeni Batur (1634–1653)
- Sengge (1653–1671)
- Galdan Boshughtu Khan (1671–1697)
- Tsewang Rabtan Khan (1697–1727)
- Galdan Tseren Khan (1727–1745)
- Tsewang Dorji Namjal (1745–1750)
- Lama Dorji (1750–1752)
- Dawachi (1752–1755)
- Amursana (1755–1757)

=== Khans of the Kalmyk Khanate ===
- Kho Orluk (Unknown–1644)
- Shukhur Daichin (1654–1661)
- Puntsug (Monchak) (1661–1669)
- Ayuka Khan (1669–1724)
- Tseren Donduk Khan (1724–1735)
- Donduk Ombo Khan (1735–1741)
- Donduk Dashi Khan (1741–1761)
- Ubashi Khan (1761–1771)

=== Khans of the Khoshut Khanate ===
- Güshi Khan — 1642–1655
- Dayan Khan — 1655–1668
- Tenzin Dalai Khan — 1668–1696
- Tenzin Wangchuk Khan — 1696–1697
- Lha-bzang Khan — 1703–1717

== Notable Kalmyk religious leaders ==
=== Šajin Lama of the Kalmyk people ===
- Chimid Baldanov
- Lubsan Sharab Tepkin
- Erdne Ombadykow

=== Lama of the Don Kalmyks ===
- Arkad Chubanov
- Djimba Mikulinov
- Menko Bormanzhinov
- Shurguchi Nimgirov
- Ivan Bultinovich Kitanov

=== Other notable Kalmyk Lamas ===
- Ja Lama
- Zaya Pandit
- Ngawang Wangyal

== Notable Kalmyk military officers ==
- Oka Gorodovikov
- Lavr Kornilov

== Fictional ==
- Ivan Skavinsky Skavar, a character in William Percy French's song, Abdul Abulbul Amir

== Sportspeople ==
- Tömöriin Artag — freestyle wrestler from Mongolia and Mongolian national wrestler, 1968 Summer Olympics bronze medalist.
- Batu Khasikov — kickboxer from Russia, Kalmyk, kickboxing champion of 2010 and 2012 (World Association of Kickboxing Organizations); International Sport Karate Association's champion of 2007.
- Khorloogiin Bayanmönkh — wrestler from Mongolia, he is Mongolian national wrestler, freestyle wrestler, sambo wrestler, 1972 Summer Olympics silver medalist, 1975 World Wrestling Championships gold medalist, 1974 World Sambo Championships gold medalist.
- Liudmila Bodnieva — handball player from Russia, Kalmyk, 2001 and 2005 World Women's Handball Championship's gold medalist.
- Sainjargalyn Nyam-Ochir — judoka for Mongolia, 2012 Summer Olympics bronze medalist.
- Mingiyan Semenov — Greco-Roman wrestler representing Russia, Kalmyk, 2012 Summer Olympics bronze medalist, 2014 World Wrestling Championships silver medalist.
- Khashbaataryn Tsagaanbaatar — judoka from Mongolia, 2004 Summer Olympics bronze medalist, 2009 World Judo Championships gold medalist.
- Ravdangiin Davaadalai – judoka from Mongolia, bronze medalist at the 1980 Summer Olympics
- Dorjsürengiin Sumiyaa – female judoka from Mongolia, silver medalist at the 2016 Summer Olympics, gold medalist at the 2017 World Judo Championships
- Avirmediin Enkhee – freestyle wrestler from mongolia , he completed 1988 Summer Olympics, silver medalist at the 1985 World Wrestling Championships
- Tömör-Ochiryn Tulga – freestyle wrestler from mongolia, he completed at the 2020 Summer Olympics, silver medalist at the 2025 World Wrestling Championships
- Baatarjavyn Shoovdor – female freestyle wrestler from mongolia, won bronze medal World Wrestling Championships
- Bat-Ochiryn Bolortuyaa – female freestyle wrestler from mongolia, bronze medalist at the 2020 Summer Olympics, bronze medalist at the 2019 World Wrestling Championships
- Terunofuji Haruo (Gantulgyn Gan-erdene) – Mongolian sumo wrestler, 73rd Yokozuna(highest rank in sumo)
- Kyokushūzan Noboru (Davaagiin Batbayar) – former Mongolian sumo wrestler, He was the first wrestler from Mongolia to reach sumo's top Makuuchi division.
- Baatarsükhiin Chinzorig – Mongolian amateur boxer, silver medalist at the 2019 World Boxing Championships, gold medalist at the 2021 Asian Amateur Boxing Championships
- Baatarkhuyagiin Otgonbold — archer from Mongolia, he competed at the 2020 Summer Olympics, gold medalist in the men’s individual event at the 2022 Asian Games.
- Youri Djorkaeff — former professional footballer from France, member of the France national football team that won the 1998 FIFA World Cup and UEFA Euro 2000.

== Others ==
- David Nikitich Kugultinov
- Jean Djorkaeff
- Kirsan Ilyumzhinov
- Ochirtu Khan

== See also ==
- List of Mongolians
- List of Buryats
