= 2018 Wrestling World Cup – Women's freestyle =

2018 Wrestling World Cup - Women's freestyle
- Host city: Takasaki, Japan
- Dates: March 17–18, 2018
- Stadium: Takasaki Arena

Champions
- Women: (gold) Japan; (silver) China; (bronze) Mongolia

The 2018 Wrestling World Cup - Women's freestyle was the first of a set of three Wrestling World Cups which were held in Takasaki, Japan on 17–18 March 2018.

== Pool stage ==
Teams qualified for the 1st place match
Teams qualified for the 3rd place match
Teams qualified for the 5th place match
Teams qualified for the 7th place match

=== Pool A ===
Pos	Team	Pld	W	L	CP	TP
1	Japan	3	3	0	104	202
2	United States	3	2	1	82	151
3	Canada	3	1	2	57	96
4	Sweden	3	0	3	14	28

POOL A
Round I

Japan 10 – 0 Sweden
Weight	Japan	result	Sweden
50 kg	Miho Igarashi	4^{F} – 0	Lovisa Ljungström
53 kg	Haruna Okuno	10 – 0	Daniela Lundström
55 kg	Saki Igarashi	10 – 0	Liliana Juarez
57 kg	Katsuki Sakagami	10 – 0	Johanna Lindborg
59 kg	Yukako Kawai	3^{F} – 2	Emma Johansson
62 kg	Yurika Itō	10 – 0	Therese Persson
65 kg	Kiwa Sakae	4 – 2	Moa Nygren
68 kg	Miwa Morikawa	5 – 1	Alexandra Sandahl
72 kg	Masako Furuichi	2 – 2	Jenny Fransson
76 kg	Yasuha Matsuyuki	6^{F} – 4	Denise Makota-Ström

Canada 2 – 8 United States
Weight	Canada	result	United States
50 kg	Jessica MacDonald	4 – 8	Victoria Anthony
53 kg	Diana Weicker	6 – 1	Haley Augello
55 kg	Jade Parsons	0 – 4^{F}	Becka Leathers
57 kg	Samantha Stewart	0 – 10	Allison Ragan
59 kg	Emily Schaefer	6 – 17	Kayla Miracle
62 kg	Jessica Brouillette	0 – 11	Mallory Velte
65 kg	Braxton Stone-Papadopoulos	0 – 10	Julia Salata
68 kg	Olivia Di Bacco	2 – 5	Tamyra Mensah
72 kg	Erica Wiebe	10^{F} – 0	Victoria Francis
76 kg	Justina Di Stasio	2 – 10	Adeline Gray

Round II

Japan 8 – 2 Canada
Weight	Japan	result	Canada
50 kg	Yuki Irie	13^{F} – 2	Jessica MacDonald
53 kg	Yu Miyahara	11^{F} – 2	Diana Weicker
55 kg	Mayu Mukaida	10 – 0	Jade Parsons
57 kg	Sae Nanjō	10 – 0	Samantha Stewart
59 kg	Yuzuru Kumano	10 – 0	Emily Schaefer
62 kg	Risako Kawai	10 – 0	Jessica Brouillette
65 kg	Ayana Gempei	WO –	Braxton Stone
68 kg	Sara Dosho	2 – 1	Danielle Lappage
72 kg	Naruha Matsuyuki	0 – 8	Erica Wiebe
76 kg	Hiroe Minagawa	3 – 3	Justina Di Stasio

Sweden 1 – 9 United States
Weight	Sweden	result	United States
50 kg	Lovisa Ljungström	0 – 4^{F}	Erin Golston
53 kg	Daniela Lundström	0 – 10	Sarah Hildebrandt
55 kg	Liliana Juarez	0 – 4^{F}	Jacarra Winchester
57 kg	Johanna Lindborg	0 – 10	Allison Ragan
59 kg	Emma Johansson	0 – 4^{F}	Kayla Miracle
62 kg	Therese Persson	– WO	Mallory Velte
65 kg	Moa Nygren	0 – 4	Forrest Molinari
68 kg	Alexandra Sandahl	0 – 10	Tamyra Mensah
72 kg	Jenny Fransson	10 – 0	Victoria Francis
76 kg	Denise Makota-Ström	0 – 2^{F}	Adeline Gray

Round III

Japan 8 – 2 United States
Weight	Japan	result	United States
50 kg	Yuki Irie	8 – 2	Victoria Anthony
53 kg	Haruna Okuno	7 – 6	Sarah Hildebrandt
55 kg	Mayu Mukaida	10 – 0	Becka Leathers
57 kg	Katsuki Sakagami	10 – 0	Allison Ragan
59 kg	Yukako Kawai	12 – 1	Kayla Miracle
62 kg	Risako Kawai	5 – 0	Mallory Velte
65 kg	Ayana Gempei	5 – 2	Julia Salata
68 kg	Miwa Morikawa	2 – 8	Tamyra Mensah
72 kg	Masako Furuichi	9 – 2	Victoria Francis
76 kg	Hiroe Minagawa	1 – 6	Adeline Gray

Sweden 1 – 9 Canada
Weight	Sweden	result	Canada
50 kg	Lovisa Ljungström	0 – 4^{F}	Jessica MacDonald
53 kg	Daniela Lundström	0 – 10	Diana Weicker
55 kg	Liliana Juarez	0 – 10	Jade Parsons
57 kg	Johanna Lindborg	3 – 6	Samantha Stewart
59 kg	Emma Johansson	0 – 4^{F}	Emily Schaefer
62 kg	Therese Persson	– WO	Jessica Brouillette
65 kg	Moa Nygren	WO –	Braxton Stone
68 kg	Alexandra Sandahl	0 – 10	Danielle Lappage
72 kg	Jenny Fransson	4 – 4	Erica Wiebe
76 kg	Denise Makota-Ström	0 – 2^{F}	Justina Di Stasio

=== Pool B ===
Pos	Team	Pld	W	L	CP	TP
1	China	3	3	0	119	220
2	Mongolia	3	2	1	74	151
3	Belarus	3	1	2	49	71
4	Romania	3	0	3	26	60

POOL B
Round I

Belarus 7 – 3 Romania
Weight	Belarus	result	Romania
50 kg	Kseniya Stankevich	7 – 14^{F}	Alina Vuc
53 kg	Vanesa Kaladzinskaya	9^{F} – 0	Estera Tămăduianu-Dobre
55 kg	Iryna Kurachkina	10^{F} – 0	Simona Pricob
57 kg	Zalina Sidakova	4 – 0	Kateryna Zhydachevska
59 kg	Katsiaryna Hanchar-Yanushkevich	WO –	-none 59 kg-
62 kg	Veranika Ivanova	3 – 0	Kriszta Incze
65 kg	Krystsina Fedarashka	1 – 1	Adina Popescu
68 kg	Hanna Sadchanka	0 – 6	Alexandra Anghel
72 kg	-none 72 kg-	– WO	Cătălina Axente
76 kg	Vasilisa Marzaliuk	WO –	-none 76 kg-

Mongolia 1 – 9 China
Weight	Mongolia	result	China
50 kg	Tsogt-Ochiryn Namuuntsetseg	0 – 10	Sun Yanan
53 kg	Erdenechimegiin Sumiyaa	8^{F} – 7	Ouyang Junling
55 kg	Erkhembayaryn Davaachimeg	5 – 6	Zhang Qi
57 kg	Altantsetsegiin Battsetseg	1 – 9	Rong Ningning
59 kg	Baatarjavyn Shoovdor	3 – 3	Pei Xingru
62 kg	Pürevdorjiin Orkhon	– WO	Luo Xiaojuan
65 kg	Soronzonboldyn Battsetseg	4 – 6	Tang Chuying
68 kg	Sharkhüügiin Tümentsetseg	5 – 16	Zhou Feng
72 kg	Ochirbatyn Nasanburmaa	4 – 15	Han Yue
76 kg	Amgalanbaataryn Chantsalnyamaa	0 – 14^{F}	Zhou Qian

Round II

Belarus 4 – 6 Mongolia
Weight	Belarus	result	Mongolia
50 kg	Kseniya Stankevich	6 – 10	Erdenesükhiin Narangerel
53 kg	Vanesa Kaladzinskaya	7 – 6	Ganbaataryn Otgonjargal
55 kg	Iryna Kurachkina	5 – 5	Erkhembayaryn Davaachimeg
57 kg	Zalina Sidakova	2 – 1	Altantsetsegiin Battsetseg
59 kg	Katsiaryna Hanchar	3 – 14	Baatarjavyn Shoovdor
62 kg	Veranika Ivanova	6^{F} – 11	Pürevdorjiin Orkhon
65 kg	Krystsina Fedarashka	0 – 10	Soronzonboldyn Battsetseg
68 kg	Hanna Sadchanka	2 – 11^{F}	Sharkhüügiin Tümentsetseg
72 kg	-none 72 kg-	– WO	Ochirbatyn Nasanburmaa
76 kg	Vasilisa Marzaliuk	4 – 1	Amgalanbaataryn Chantsalnyamaa

Romania 0 – 10 China
Weight	Romania	result	China
50 kg	Alina Vuc	0 – 10	Zhu Jiang
53 kg	Estera Tămăduianu-Dobre	0 – 11^{F}	Ouyang Junling
55 kg	Simona Pricob	0 – 10	Zhang Qi
57 kg	Kateryna Zhydachevska	4 – 8	Yang Nan
59 kg	-none 59 kg-	– WO	Bao Lingling
62 kg	Kriszta Incze	2 – 3	Luo Xiaojuan
65 kg	Adina Popescu	0 – 10	Tang Chuying
68 kg	Alexandra Anghel	0 – 11^{F}	Zhou Feng
72 kg	Cătălina Axente	0 – 11	Wang Juan
76 kg	-none 76 kg-	– WO	Pa Liha

Round III

Belarus 0 – 10 China
Weight	Belarus	result	China
50 kg	Kseniya Stankevich	0 – 2^{F}	Sun Yanan
53 kg	Vanesa Kaladzinskaya	– WO	Ouyang Junling
55 kg	Iryna Kurachkina	0 – 10	Zhang Qi
57 kg	Zalina Sidakova	0 – 10	Rong Ningning
59 kg	Katsiaryna Hanchar	0 – 10	Pei Xingru
62 kg	Veranika Ivanova	0 – 4^{F}	Luo Xiaojuan
65 kg	Krystsina Fedarashka	0 – 10	Tang Chuying
68 kg	Hanna Sadchanka	0 – 11	Zhou Feng
72 kg	-none 72 kg-	– WO	Han Yue
76 kg	Vasilisa Marzaliuk	2 – 3	Zhou Qian

Romania 2 – 8 Mongolia
Weight	Romania	result	Mongolia
50 kg	Alina Vuc	10 – 0	Tsogt-Ochiryn Namuuntsetseg
53 kg	Estera Tămăduianu-Dobre	8 – 9^{F}	Ganbaataryn Otgonjargal
55 kg	Simona Pricob	0 – 3	Erkhembayaryn Davaachimeg
57 kg	Kateryna Zhydachevska	5 – 11	Altantsetsegiin Battsetseg
59 kg	-none 59 kg-	–	Baatarjavyn Shoovdor
62 kg	Kriszta Incze	WO –	Pürevdorjiin Orkhon
65 kg	Adina Popescu	0 – 9^{F}	Soronzonboldyn Battsetseg
68 kg	Alexandra Anghel	10 – 16^{F}	Sharkhüügiin Tümentsetseg
72 kg	Cătălina Axente	0 – 4^{F}	Ochirbatyn Nasanburmaa
76 kg	-none 76 kg-	– WO	Amgalanbaataryn Chantsalnyamaa

== Medal Matches ==
Medal Matches
First Place Match

Japan 6 – 4 China
Weight	Japan	result	China
50 kg	Yuki Irie	10^{F} – 0	Sun Yanan
53 kg	Haruna Okuno	4^{F} – 0	Ouyang Junling
55 kg	Mayu Mukaida	10 – 0	Xie Mengyu
57 kg	Katsuki Sakagami	4 – 15	Rong Ningning
59 kg	Yukako Kawai	3 – 1	Pei Xingru
62 kg	Risako Kawai	10 – 4	Luo Xiaojuan
65 kg	Ayana Gempei	6 – 3	Tang Chuying
68 kg	Miwa Morikawa	0 – 9	Zhou Feng
72 kg	Masako Furuichi	7 – 10	Han Yue
76 kg	Hiroe Minagawa	1 – 7	Zhou Qian

Third Place Match

United States 4 – 6 Mongolia
Weight	United States	result	Mongolia
50 kg	Victoria Anthony	8^{F} – 2	Erdenesükhiin Narangerel
53 kg	Sarah Hildebrandt	6 – 10	Erdenechimegiin Sumiyaa
55 kg	Jacarra Winchester	6 – 9	Erkhembayaryn Davaachimeg
57 kg	Allison Ragan	0 – 10	Altantsetsegiin Battsetseg
59 kg	Kayla Miracle	4 – 5	Baatarjavyn Shoovdor
62 kg	Mallory Velte	11 – 9	Pürevdorjiin Orkhon
65 kg	Forrest Molinari	4^{F} – 4	Soronzonboldyn Battsetseg
68 kg	Tamyra Mensah	5 – 4^{F}	Sharkhüügiin Tümentsetseg
72 kg	Victoria Francis	3 – 11	Ochirbatyn Nasanburmaa
76 kg	Adeline Gray	10 – 0	Amgalanbaataryn Chantsalnyamaa

Fifth Place Match

Canada 5 – 5.df Belarus
Weight	Canada	result	Belarus
50 kg	Jessica MacDonald	6^{F} – 2	Kseniya Stankevich
53 kg	Diana Weicker	WO –	Vanesa Kaladzinskaya
55 kg	Jade Parsons	4 – 10	Iryna Kurachkina
57 kg	Samantha Stewart	7 – 0	Zalina Sidakova
59 kg	Emily Schaefer	2 – 12	Katsiaryna Hanchar
62 kg	Jessica Brouillette	0 – 4^{F}	Veranika Ivanova
65 kg	Braxton Stone	– WO	Krystsina Fedarashka
68 kg	Olivia Di Bacco	5 – 2	Hanna Sadchanka
72 kg	Erica Wiebe	WO –	-none 72 kg-
76 kg	Justina Di Stasio	4 – 6	Vasilisa Marzaliuk

Seventh Place Match

Sweden 5 – 5.df Romania
Weight	Sweden	result	Romania
50 kg	Lovisa Ljungström	0 – 8^{F}	Alina Vuc
53 kg	Daniela Lundström	0 – 10	Estera Tămăduianu-Dobre
55 kg	Liliana Juarez	0 – 10	Simona Pricob
57 kg	Johanna Lindborg	3 – 10^{F}	Kateryna Zhydachevska
59 kg	Emma Johansson	WO –	-none 59 kg-
62 kg	Therese Persson	– WO	Kriszta Incze
65 kg	Moa Nygren	6^{F} – 2	Adina Popescu
68 kg	Alexandra Sandahl	9 – 2	Alexandra Anghel
72 kg	Jenny Fransson	10 – 0	Cătălina Axente
76 kg	Denise Makota-Ström	WO –	-none 76 kg-

== Final ranking ==
Team	Pld	W	L
Japan	4	4	0
China	4	3	1
Mongolia	4	3	1
United States	4	2	2
Canada	4	2	2
Belarus	4	1	3
Romania	4	1	3
Sweden	4	0	4

== See also ==
- 2018 Wrestling World Cup - Men's Greco-Roman
- 2018 Wrestling World Cup - Men's freestyle
