= 2019 World Wrestling Championships – Women's freestyle 59 kg =

Women's freestyle 59 kg at the 2019 World Championships
- Venue: Barys Arena
- Dates: 18–19 September 2019
- Competitors: 18 from 18 nations

Medalists
gold medal	Linda Morais	Canada
silver medal	Lyubov Ovcharova	Russia
bronze medal	Pei Xingru	China
bronze medal	Baatarjavyn Shoovdor	Mongolia

The women's freestyle 59 kilograms is a competition featured at the 2019 World Wrestling Championships, and was held in Nur-Sultan, Kazakhstan on 18 and 19 September.

This freestyle wrestling competition consists of a single-elimination tournament, with a repechage used to determine the winner of two bronze medals. The two finalists face off for gold and silver medals. Each wrestler who loses to one of the two finalists moves into the repechage, culminating in a pair of bronze medal matches featuring the semifinal losers each facing the remaining repechage opponent from their half of the bracket.

== Results ==
Legend

- F — Won by fall

=== Final ===
Final
Lyubov Ovcharova (RUS)	6
Linda Morais (CAN)	3^{F}

=== Top half ===
Round of 32

Round of 16
Yuzuka Inagaki (JPN)	4^{F}
Choi Yeon-woo (KOR)	0
Katsiaryna Hanchar (BLR)	2
Pooja Dhanda (IND)	12
Lyubov Ovcharova (RUS)	5^{F}
Gulnora Toshpulatova (UZB)	0
Madina Bakbergenova (KAZ)	0
Pei Xingru (CHN)	10

Quarterfinals
Yuzuka Inagaki (JPN)	8
Pooja Dhanda (IND)	11
Lyubov Ovcharova (RUS)	8^{F}
Pei Xingru (CHN)	8

Semifinals
Pooja Dhanda (IND)	0
Lyubov Ovcharova (RUS)	10

=== Bottom half ===
Round of 32
Tetiana Omelchenko (AZE)	6^{F}
Ana Moceyawa (NZL)	0
Anhelina Lysak (UKR)	6^{F}
Alli Ragan (USA)	2

Round of 16
Baatarjavyn Shoovdor (MGL)	4
Kateryna Zhydachevska (ROU)	0
Sandra Paruszewski (GER)	6
Elif Yanık (TUR)	3
Đào Thị Hương (VIE)	2
Tetiana Omelchenko (AZE)	10
Anhelina Lysak (UKR)	2
Linda Morais (CAN)	12

Quarterfinals
Baatarjavyn Shoovdor (MGL)	6
Sandra Paruszewski (GER)	2
Tetiana Omelchenko (AZE)	4
Linda Morais (CAN)	6

Semifinals
Baatarjavyn Shoovdor (MGL)	1
Linda Morais (CAN)	3

=== Repechage ===
Repechage round 2
Gulnora Toshpulatova (UZB)	0
Pei Xingru (CHN)	12
Anhelina Lysak (UKR)	6
Tetiana Omelchenko (AZE)	6

Bronze medals
Pei Xingru (CHN)	5
Pooja Dhanda (IND)	3
Anhelina Lysak (UKR)	0
Baatarjavyn Shoovdor (MGL)	8^{F}
