= Wrestling at the 2018 Asian Games =

- Venue: Jakarta Convention Center
- Dates: 19–22 August 2018
- Competitors: 249 from 29 nations

Wrestling at the 2018 Asian Games was held at the Jakarta Convention Center Assembly Hall, Jakarta, Indonesia from 19 to 22 August 2018.

== Schedule ==
| P | Preliminary rounds & Repechage | F | Finals |

| Event↓/Date → | 19th Sun | | 20th Mon | | 21st Tue | | 22nd Wed | |
|---|---|---|---|---|---|---|---|---|
| Men's freestyle 57 kg | P | F | | | | | | |
| Men's freestyle 65 kg | P | F | | | | | | |
| Men's freestyle 74 kg | P | F | | | | | | |
| Men's freestyle 86 kg | P | F | | | | | | |
| Men's freestyle 97 kg | P | F | | | | | | |
| Men's freestyle 125 kg | | | P | F | | | | |
| Men's Greco-Roman 60 kg | | | | | P | F | | |
| Men's Greco-Roman 67 kg | | | | | P | F | | |
| Men's Greco-Roman 77 kg | | | | | | | P | F |
| Men's Greco-Roman 87 kg | | | | | | | P | F |
| Men's Greco-Roman 97 kg | | | | | | | P | F |
| Men's Greco-Roman 130 kg | | | | | | | P | F |
| Women's freestyle 50 kg | | | P | F | | | | |
| Women's freestyle 53 kg | | | P | F | | | | |
| Women's freestyle 57 kg | | | P | F | | | | |
| Women's freestyle 62 kg | | | P | F | | | | |
| Women's freestyle 68 kg | | | | | P | F | | |
| Women's freestyle 76 kg | | | | | P | F | | |

== Medalists ==
=== Men's freestyle ===
| Event | Gold | Silver | Bronze |
|---|---|---|---|
| 57 kg | Erdenebatyn Bekhbayar; Mongolia | Kang Kum-song; North Korea | Yuki Takahashi; Japan |
| 57 kg | Erdenebatyn Bekhbayar; Mongolia | Kang Kum-song; North Korea | Reza Atri; Iran |
| 65 kg | Bajrang Punia; India | Daichi Takatani; Japan | Sirojiddin Khasanov; Uzbekistan |
| 65 kg | Bajrang Punia; India | Daichi Takatani; Japan | Sayatbek Okassov; Kazakhstan |
| 74 kg | Bekzod Abdurakhmonov; Uzbekistan | Daniyar Kaisanov; Kazakhstan | Gong Byung-min; South Korea |
| 74 kg | Bekzod Abdurakhmonov; Uzbekistan | Daniyar Kaisanov; Kazakhstan | Yuhi Fujinami; Japan |
| 86 kg | Hassan Yazdani; Iran | Domenic Abounader; Lebanon | Adilet Davlumbayev; Kazakhstan |
| 86 kg | Hassan Yazdani; Iran | Domenic Abounader; Lebanon | Orgodolyn Üitümen; Mongolia |
| 97 kg | Alireza Karimi; Iran | Magomed Musaev; Kyrgyzstan | Magomed Ibragimov; Uzbekistan |
| 97 kg | Alireza Karimi; Iran | Magomed Musaev; Kyrgyzstan | Kim Jae-gang; South Korea |
| 125 kg | Parviz Hadi; Iran | Deng Zhiwei; China | Nam Kyung-jin; South Korea |
| 125 kg | Parviz Hadi; Iran | Deng Zhiwei; China | Davit Modzmanashvili; Uzbekistan |

=== Men's Greco-Roman ===
| Event | Gold | Silver | Bronze |
|---|---|---|---|
| 60 kg | Shinobu Ota; Japan | Kanybek Zholchubekov; Kyrgyzstan | Meirambek Ainagulov; Kazakhstan |
| 60 kg | Shinobu Ota; Japan | Kanybek Zholchubekov; Kyrgyzstan | Mehrdad Mardani; Iran |
| 67 kg | Ryu Han-su; South Korea | Almat Kebispayev; Kazakhstan | Amantur Ismailov; Kyrgyzstan |
| 67 kg | Ryu Han-su; South Korea | Almat Kebispayev; Kazakhstan | Mohammad Reza Geraei; Iran |
| 77 kg | Mohammad Ali Geraei; Iran | Akzhol Makhmudov; Kyrgyzstan | Kim Hyeon-woo; South Korea |
| 77 kg | Mohammad Ali Geraei; Iran | Akzhol Makhmudov; Kyrgyzstan | Yang Bin; China |
| 87 kg | Hossein Nouri; Iran | Rustam Assakalov; Uzbekistan | Şyhazberdi Öwelekow; Turkmenistan |
| 87 kg | Hossein Nouri; Iran | Rustam Assakalov; Uzbekistan | Azamat Kustubayev; Kazakhstan |
| 97 kg | Cho Hyo-chul; South Korea | Xiao Di; China | Yerulan Iskakov; Kazakhstan |
| 97 kg | Cho Hyo-chul; South Korea | Xiao Di; China | Uzur Dzhuzupbekov; Kyrgyzstan |
| 130 kg | Muminjon Abdullaev; Uzbekistan | Nurmakhan Tinaliyev; Kazakhstan | Arata Sonoda; Japan |
| 130 kg | Muminjon Abdullaev; Uzbekistan | Nurmakhan Tinaliyev; Kazakhstan | Kim Min-seok; South Korea |

=== Women's freestyle ===
| Event | Gold | Silver | Bronze |
|---|---|---|---|
| 50 kg | Vinesh Phogat; India | Yuki Irie; Japan | Kim Son-hyang; North Korea |
| 50 kg | Vinesh Phogat; India | Yuki Irie; Japan | Kim Hyung-joo; South Korea |
| 53 kg | Pak Yong-mi; North Korea | Zhuldyz Eshimova; Kazakhstan | Haruna Okuno; Japan |
| 53 kg | Pak Yong-mi; North Korea | Zhuldyz Eshimova; Kazakhstan | Erdenechimegiin Sumiyaa; Mongolia |
| 57 kg | Jong Myong-suk; North Korea | Pei Xingru; China | Altantsetsegiin Battsetseg; Mongolia |
| 57 kg | Jong Myong-suk; North Korea | Pei Xingru; China | Katsuki Sakagami; Japan |
| 62 kg | Aisuluu Tynybekova; Kyrgyzstan | Risako Kawai; Japan | Nguyễn Thị Mỹ Hạnh; Vietnam |
| 62 kg | Aisuluu Tynybekova; Kyrgyzstan | Risako Kawai; Japan | Rim Jong-sim; North Korea |
| 68 kg | Zhou Feng; China | Sharkhüügiin Tümentsetseg; Mongolia | Divya Kakran; India |
| 68 kg | Zhou Feng; China | Sharkhüügiin Tümentsetseg; Mongolia | Meerim Zhumanazarova; Kyrgyzstan |
| 76 kg | Zhou Qian; China | Hiroe Minagawa; Japan | Elmira Syzdykova; Kazakhstan |
| 76 kg | Zhou Qian; China | Hiroe Minagawa; Japan | Aiperi Medet Kyzy; Kyrgyzstan |

== Medal table ==
| Rank | Nation | Gold | Silver | Bronze | Total |
|---|---|---|---|---|---|
| 1 | Iran (IRI) | 5 | 0 | 3 | 8 |
| 2 | China (CHN) | 2 | 3 | 1 | 6 |
| 3 | Uzbekistan (UZB) | 2 | 1 | 3 | 6 |
| 4 | North Korea (PRK) | 2 | 1 | 2 | 5 |
| 5 | South Korea (KOR) | 2 | 0 | 6 | 8 |
| 6 | India (IND) | 2 | 0 | 1 | 3 |
| 7 | Japan (JPN) | 1 | 4 | 5 | 10 |
| 8 | Kyrgyzstan (KGZ) | 1 | 3 | 4 | 8 |
| 9 | Mongolia (MGL) | 1 | 1 | 3 | 5 |
| 10 | Kazakhstan (KAZ) | 0 | 4 | 6 | 10 |
| 11 | Lebanon (LBN) | 0 | 1 | 0 | 1 |
| 12 | Turkmenistan (TKM) | 0 | 0 | 1 | 1 |
| 12 | Vietnam (VIE) | 0 | 0 | 1 | 1 |
| Totals (13 entries) | | 18 | 18 | 36 | 72 |

== Participating nations ==
A total of 249 athletes from 29 nations competed in wrestling at the 2018 Asian Games:

- Afghanistan (6)
- Bahrain (1)
- Bangladesh (3)
- Cambodia (5)
- China (18)
- Chinese Taipei (6)
- India (18)
- Indonesia (18)
- Iran (12)
- Japan (18)
- Kazakhstan (17)
- Kyrgyzstan (13)
- Lebanon (1)
- Mongolia (12)
- Nepal (3)
- North Korea (8)
- Pakistan (4)
- Palestine (2)
- Philippines (2)
- Qatar (2)
- South Korea (18)
- Sri Lanka (1)
- Syria (2)
- Tajikistan (9)
- Thailand (12)
- Turkmenistan (10)
- Uzbekistan (15)
- Vietnam (9)
- Yemen (4)
