= 2016 World Wrestling Championships – Women's freestyle 60 kg =

Women's freestyle 60 kg at the 2016 World Championships
- Venue: SYMA Sports and Conference Centre
- Dates: 11 December 2016
- Competitors: 19 from 19 nations

Medalists
gold medal	Pei Xingru	China
silver medal	Alli Ragan	United States
bronze medal	Emese Barka	Hungary
bronze medal	Linda Morais	Canada

The women's freestyle 60 kilograms is a competition featured at the 2016 World Wrestling Championships, and was held in Budapest, Hungary on 11 December.

== Results ==
Legend

- F — Won by fall

=== Final ===
Final
Pei Xingru (CHN)	6
Alli Ragan (USA)	0

=== Top half ===
Round of 32

Round of 16
Tetiana Omelchenko (AZE)	0
Emese Barka (HUN)	10
Pei Xingru (CHN)	10
Therese Persson (SWE)	0
Yui Sakano (JPN)	10
Yulia Prontsevich (RUS)	1
Zalina Sidakova (BLR)	1
Baatarjavyn Shoovdor (MGL)	4

Quarterfinals
Emese Barka (HUN)	4
Pei Xingru (CHN)	8
Yui Sakano (JPN)	4
Baatarjavyn Shoovdor (MGL)	3

Semifinals
Pei Xingru (CHN)	8
Yui Sakano (JPN)	6

=== Bottom half ===
Round of 32
Li Chia-hsin (TPE)	0
Laura Mertens (GER)	8^{F}
Sarita Mor (IND)	4
Alli Ragan (USA)	8
Derya Bayhan (TUR)	0
Linda Morais (CAN)	6^{F}

Round of 16
Katarzyna Mądrowska (POL)	7^{F}
Anhelina Lysak (UKR)	9
Viktoria Bobeva (BUL)	7
Ayaulym Kassymova (KAZ)	8
Kateryna Zhydachevska (ROU)	3
Laura Mertens (GER)	6
Alli Ragan (USA)	6
Linda Morais (CAN)	3

Quarterfinals
Katarzyna Mądrowska (POL)	2
Ayaulym Kassymova (KAZ)	8
Laura Mertens (GER)	0
Alli Ragan (USA)	5

Semifinals
Ayaulym Kassymova (KAZ)	4
Alli Ragan (USA)	14

=== Repechage ===
Repechage round 1
Sarita Mor (IND)	0
Linda Morais (CAN)	5

Repechage round 2
Therese Persson (SWE)	0
Emese Barka (HUN)	10
Linda Morais (CAN)	6^{F}
Laura Mertens (GER)	2

Bronze medals
Emese Barka (HUN)	7
Yui Sakano (JPN)	4
Linda Morais (CAN)	10
Ayaulym Kassymova (KAZ)	0
