= 2018 World Wrestling Championships – Women's freestyle 59 kg =

Women's freestyle 59 kg at the 2018 World Championships
- Venue: László Papp Budapest Sports Arena
- Dates: 22–23 October 2018
- Competitors: 21 from 21 nations

Medalists
gold medal	Risako Kawai	Japan
silver medal	Elif Jale Yeşilırmak	Turkey
bronze medal	Pei Xingru	China
bronze medal	Baatarjavyn Shoovdor	Mongolia

The women's freestyle 59 kilograms is a competition featured at the 2018 World Wrestling Championships, and was held in Budapest, Hungary on 22 and 23 October.

This freestyle wrestling competition consists of a single-elimination tournament, with a repechage used to determine the winner of two bronze medals. The two finalists face off for gold and silver medals. Each wrestler who loses to one of the two finalists moves into the repechage, culminating in a pair of bronze medal matches featuring the semifinal losers each facing the remaining repechage opponent from their half of the bracket.

== Results ==
Legend

- F — Won by fall
- R — Retired
- WO — Won by walkover

=== Final ===
Final
Risako Kawai (JPN)	8
Elif Jale Yeşilırmak (TUR)	0

=== Top half ===
Round of 32

Round of 16
Svetlana Lipatova (RUS)	4
Tetiana Omelchenko (AZE)	0
Joseph Essombe (CMR)	10^{F}
Nes Marie Rodríguez (PUR)	2
Katsiaryna Hanchar (BLR)	8
Marwa Amri (TUN)	4
Risako Kawai (JPN)	6
Pei Xingru (CHN)	0

Quarterfinals
Svetlana Lipatova (RUS)	13
Joseph Essombe (CMR)	2
Katsiaryna Hanchar (BLR)	0
Risako Kawai (JPN)	10^{F}

Semifinals
Svetlana Lipatova (RUS)	0
Risako Kawai (JPN)	10

=== Bottom half ===
Round of 32
Kim Bo-bae (KOR)	1
Sarita Mor (IND)	8
Đào Thị Hương (VIE)	0
Sofiia Bodnar (UKR)	11
Mariana Cherdivara (MDA)	3
Altynay Satylgan (KAZ)	3
Alejandra Romero (MEX)	8
Tamara Dollák (HUN)	0
~~Fatoumata Camara (GUI)~~
Linda Morais (CAN)	WO

Round of 16
Baatarjavyn Shoovdor (MGL)	1
Jenna Burkert (USA)	1
Sarita Mor (IND)	4
Sofiia Bodnar (UKR)	0^{R}
Altynay Satylgan (KAZ)	3
Alejandra Romero (MEX)	5
Linda Morais (CAN)	3
Elif Jale Yeşilırmak (TUR)	5

Quarterfinals
Baatarjavyn Shoovdor (MGL)	10
Sarita Mor (IND)	0
Alejandra Romero (MEX)	0
Elif Jale Yeşilırmak (TUR)	3

Semifinals
Baatarjavyn Shoovdor (MGL)	1
Elif Jale Yeşilırmak (TUR)	11

=== Repechage ===
Repechage round 2
Pei Xingru (CHN)	4
Katsiaryna Hanchar (BLR)	3
Linda Morais (CAN)	3
Alejandra Romero (MEX)	5^{F}

Bronze medals
Pei Xingru (CHN)	7
Svetlana Lipatova (RUS)	1
Alejandra Romero (MEX)	2
Baatarjavyn Shoovdor (MGL)	4
