= 2019 World Wrestling Championships – Women's freestyle 62 kg =

Women's freestyle 62 kg at the 2019 World Championships
- Venue: Barys Arena
- Dates: 19–20 September 2019
- Competitors: 34 from 34 nations

Medalists
gold medal	Aisuluu Tynybekova	Kyrgyzstan
silver medal	Taybe Yusein	Bulgaria
bronze medal	Henna Johansson	Sweden
bronze medal	Yukako Kawai	Japan

The women's freestyle 62 kilograms is a competition featured at the 2019 World Wrestling Championships, and was held in Nur-Sultan, Kazakhstan on 19 and 20 September.

== Results ==
Legend

- F — Won by fall

=== Finals ===
Semifinals		Final
Taybe Yusein (BUL)	10
Marianna Sastin (HUN)	0	Taybe Yusein (BUL)	3
Aisuluu Tynybekova (KGZ)	7	Aisuluu Tynybekova (KGZ)	5
Rim Jong-sim (PRK)	0

=== Top half ===
==== Section 1 ====
Round of 64

Round of 32
Taybe Yusein (BUL)	10
Luo Xiaojuan (CHN)	0
Elmira Gambarova (AZE)	2
Kriszta Incze (ROU)	3^{F}
Krystsina Fedarashka (BLR)	0
Henna Johansson (SWE)	3^{F}
Tayla Ford (NZL)	2
Lydia Pérez (ESP)	6

Round of 16
Taybe Yusein (BUL)	6^{F}
Kriszta Incze (ROU)	1
Henna Johansson (SWE)	11
Lydia Pérez (ESP)	0

Quarterfinals
Taybe Yusein (BUL)	10
Henna Johansson (SWE)	5

==== Section 2 ====
Round of 64

Round of 32
Mariana Cherdivara (MDA)	6
Ayaulym Kassymova (KAZ)	1
Nathaly Grimán (VEN)	10
Katarzyna Mądrowska (POL)	0
Choi Ji-ae (KOR)	10
Cansu Aksoy (TUR)	6
Aurora Campagna (ITA)	2
Marianna Sastin (HUN)	7

Round of 16
Mariana Cherdivara (MDA)	6
Nathaly Grimán (VEN)	6
Choi Ji-ae (KOR)	0
Marianna Sastin (HUN)	10

Quarterfinals
Mariana Cherdivara (MDA)	3
Marianna Sastin (HUN)	5

=== Bottom half ===
==== Section 3 ====
Round of 64

Round of 32
Yukako Kawai (JPN)	7
Luisa Niemesch (GER)	0
Alejandra Romero (MEX)	0
Aisuluu Tynybekova (KGZ)	8
Sakshi Malik (IND)	7
Aminat Adeniyi (NGR)	10
Yuliya Tkach (UKR)	12
Jackeline Rentería (COL)	2

Round of 16
Yukako Kawai (JPN)	3
Aisuluu Tynybekova (KGZ)	3^{F}
Aminat Adeniyi (NGR)	2
Yuliya Tkach (UKR)	4^{F}

Quarterfinals
Aisuluu Tynybekova (KGZ)	9
Yuliya Tkach (UKR)	6

==== Section 4 ====
Round of 64
Marwa Amri (TUN)	5
Rim Jong-sim (PRK)	12
Nabira Esenbaeva (UZB)	0
Kayla Miracle (USA)	11

Round of 32
Nguyễn Thị Mỹ Hạnh (VIE)	4
Ana Godinez (CAN)	10
Maria Kuznetsova (RUS)	3
Enkhbatyn Gantuyaa (MGL)	6
Berthe Etane Ngolle (CMR)	1
Rim Jong-sim (PRK)	12
Kayla Miracle (USA)	15
Laís Nunes (BRA)	4

Round of 16
Ana Godinez (CAN)	1
Enkhbatyn Gantuyaa (MGL)	2
Rim Jong-sim (PRK)	6
Kayla Miracle (USA)	6

Quarterfinals
Enkhbatyn Gantuyaa (MGL)	5
Rim Jong-sim (PRK)	6

=== Repechage ===
Repechage round 2
Luo Xiaojuan (CHN)	2
Kriszta Incze (ROU)	10
Alejandra Romero (MEX)	0
Yukako Kawai (JPN)	9

Repechage round 3
Kriszta Incze (ROU)	0
Henna Johansson (SWE)	4
Yukako Kawai (JPN)	3
Yuliya Tkach (UKR)	0

Bronze medals
Henna Johansson (SWE)	4
Marianna Sastin (HUN)	1
Yukako Kawai (JPN)	12
Rim Jong-sim (PRK)	1
