= 2017 World Wrestling Championships – Women's freestyle 60 kg =

Women's freestyle 60 kg at the 2017 World Championships
- Venue: AccorHotels Arena
- Dates: 24 August 2017
- Competitors: 23 from 23 nations

Medalists
gold medal	Risako Kawai	Japan
silver medal	Alli Ragan	United States
bronze medal	Anastasija Grigorjeva	Latvia
bronze medal	Johanna Mattsson	Sweden

The women's freestyle 60 kilograms is a competition featured at the 2017 World Wrestling Championships, and was held in Paris, France on 24 August 2017.

This freestyle wrestling competition consisted of a single-elimination tournament, with a repechage used to determine the winners of two bronze medals.

== Results ==
Legend

- F — Won by fall
- R — Retired
- WO — Won by walkover

=== Final ===
Final
Alli Ragan (USA)	0
Risako Kawai (JPN)	13

=== Top half ===
Round of 32
Tetiana Omelchenko (AZE)	0
Anastasija Grigorjeva (LAT)	2

Round of 16
Alli Ragan (USA)	10
Gabriella Sleisz (HUN)	0
Luisa Niemesch (GER)	3
Sakshi Malik (IND)	2
Nguyễn Thị Mỹ Hạnh (VIE)	8^{F}
Derya Bayhan (TUR)	2
Nes Marie Rodríguez (PUR)	6
Anastasija Grigorjeva (LAT)	9^{F}

Quarterfinals
Alli Ragan (USA)	4
Luisa Niemesch (GER)	0
Nguyễn Thị Mỹ Hạnh (VIE)	0
Anastasija Grigorjeva (LAT)	10^{F}

Semifinals
Alli Ragan (USA)	6^{F}
Anastasija Grigorjeva (LAT)	3

=== Bottom half ===
Round of 32
Lyubov Ovcharova (RUS)	2^{R}
Risako Kawai (JPN)	2
Aurélie Basset (FRA)	0
Linda Morais (CAN)	10
Anastasiya Huchok (BLR)	5
Kwon Hyeon-ju (KOR)	15
Katarzyna Mądrowska (POL)	2
Johanna Mattsson (SWE)	4^{F}
Sun Yazhen (CHN)	4
Mimi Hristova (BUL)	10^{F}
Sofiia Bodnar (UKR)	2
Kriszta Incze (ROU)	6

Round of 16
Baatarjavyn Shoovdor (MGL)	2
Risako Kawai (JPN)	6
Linda Morais (CAN)	15
Kwon Hyeon-ju (KOR)	4
Johanna Mattsson (SWE)	2^{F}
Mimi Hristova (BUL)	1
Kriszta Incze (ROU)	7
Ayaulym Kassymova (KAZ)	3

Quarterfinals
Risako Kawai (JPN)	10
Linda Morais (CAN)	0
Johanna Mattsson (SWE)	7
Kriszta Incze (ROU)	3

Semifinals
Risako Kawai (JPN)	6
Johanna Mattsson (SWE)	0

=== Repechage ===
Repechage round 1
Lyubov Ovcharova (RUS)
Baatarjavyn Shoovdor (MGL)	WO

Repechage round 2
Gabriella Sleisz (HUN)	1
Luisa Niemesch (GER)	6
Baatarjavyn Shoovdor (MGL)	11^{F}
Linda Morais (CAN)	8

Bronze medals
Luisa Niemesch (GER)	2
Anastasija Grigorjeva (LAT)	3
Baatarjavyn Shoovdor (MGL)	3
Johanna Mattsson (SWE)	8
