= Rim Jong-sim (wrestler) =

North Korean freestyle wrestler

Personal information
- Born: 25 April 1994 (age 32)

Sport
- Country: North Korea
- Sport: Amateur wrestling
- Event: Freestyle
Medal record
Women's freestyle wrestling
Representing North Korea
Asian Games
Bronze medal – third place	2018 Jakarta	62 kg
Asian Championships
Silver medal – second place	2016 Bangkok	63 kg

Rim Jong-sim (born 25 April 1994) is a North Korean freestyle wrestler. She won one of the bronze medals in the women's freestyle 62 kg event at the 2018 Asian Games held in Jakarta, Indonesia.

== Career ==
At the 2016 Asian Wrestling Championships held in Bangkok, Thailand, she won the silver medal in the women's 63 kg event.

In 2019, she competed in the women's freestyle 62 kg event at the World Wrestling Championships held in Nur-Sultan, Kazakhstan. In this competition she lost her bronze medal match against Yukako Kawai of Japan.

== Achievements ==
Year	Tournament	Location	Result	Event
2018	Asian Games	Jakarta, Indonesia	3rd	Freestyle 62 kg
