= Wrestling at the 2018 Commonwealth Games – Women's freestyle 57 kg =

Wrestling – Women's freestyle 57 kg at the 2018 Commonwealth Games
- Venue: Carrara Sports and Leisure Centre
- Dates: 13 April 2018
- Competitors: 7 from 7 nations

Medalists
gold medal	Odunayo Adekuoroye	Nigeria
silver medal	Pooja Dhanda	India
bronze medal	Emily Schaefer	Canada

The women's freestyle 57 kg freestyle wrestling competition at the 2018 Commonwealth Games in Gold Coast, Australia was held on 13 April 2018 at the Carrara Sports and Leisure Centre.

== Results ==
As there were less than 6 competitors entered in this event, the competition was contested as a Nordic round with each athlete playing every other athlete. The medallists were determined by the standings after the completion of the Nordic round.

Legend

- F — Won by fall

=== Elimination groups ===
==== Group A ====
Pos	Athlete	Pld	W	L	CP	TP
1	Odunayo Adekuoroye (NGR)	3	3	0	12	34
2	Joseph Essombe (CMR)	3	2	1	11	15
3	Sarah McDaid (NIR)	3	1	2	5	4
4	Noellancia Genave (MRI)	3	0	3	0	0

Source: UWW

	Score		CP
Noellancia Genave (MRI)	0–4 Fall	Joseph Essombe (CMR)	0–5 VFA
Sarah McDaid (NIR)	0–11	Odunayo Adekuoroye (NGR)	0–4 VSU
Noellancia Genave (MRI)	0–4 Fall	Sarah McDaid (NIR)	0–5 VFA
Joseph Essombe (CMR)	2–13	Odunayo Adekuoroye (NGR)	1–4 VSU1
Noellancia Genave (MRI)	0–10	Odunayo Adekuoroye (NGR)	0–4 VSU
Joseph Essombe (CMR)	9–0 Fall	Sarah McDaid (NIR)	5–0 VFA

==== Group B ====
Pos	Athlete	Pld	W	L	CP	TP
1	Pooja Dhanda (IND)	2	2	0	8	20
2	Emily Schaefer (CAN)	2	1	1	6	8
3	Ana Moceyawa (NZL)	2	0	2	0	0

Source: UWW

	Score		CP
Emily Schaefer (CAN)	3–0 Fall	Ana Moceyawa (NZL)	5–0 VFA
Emily Schaefer (CAN)	5–12	Pooja Dhanda (IND)	1–3 VPO1
Pooja Dhanda (IND)	8–0 Fall	Ana Moceyawa (NZL)	5–0 VFA

=== Knockout round ===
Semifinals
Odunayo Adekuoroye (NGR)	10
Emily Schaefer (CAN)	0
Pooja Dhanda (IND)	11
Joseph Essombe (CMR)	5

Finals
Odunayo Adekuoroye (NGR)	7
Pooja Dhanda (IND)	5
Bronze medal match
Emily Schaefer (CAN)	13
Joseph Essombe (CMR)	3
