= 2021 World Wrestling Championships – Women's freestyle 59 kg =

Wrestling competitions

Women's freestyle 59 kg at the 2021 World Championships
- Venue: Nye Jordal Amfi
- Dates: 6–7 October 2021
- Competitors: 17 from 17 nations

Medalists
gold medal	Bilyana Dudova	Bulgaria
silver medal	Akie Hanai	Japan
bronze medal	Baatarjavyn Shoovdor	Mongolia
bronze medal	Sarita Mor	India

The women's freestyle 59 kilograms is a competition featured at the 2021 World Wrestling Championships, and was held in Oslo, Norway on 6 and 7 October.

This freestyle wrestling competition consists of a single-elimination tournament, with a repechage used to determine the winner of two bronze medals. The two finalists face off for gold and silver medals. Each wrestler who loses to one of the two finalists moves into the repechage, culminating in a pair of bronze medal matches featuring the semifinal losers each facing the remaining repechage opponent from their half of the bracket.

== Results ==
Legend

- F — Won by fall

=== Final ===
Final
Akie Hanai (JPN)	4
Bilyana Dudova (BUL)	6

=== Top half ===
Round of 32

Round of 16
Diana Kayumova (KAZ)	4
Akie Hanai (JPN)	7^{F}
Svetlana Lipatova (RWF)	1
Baatarjavyn Shoovdor (MGL)	2
Alyona Kolesnik (AZE)	4
Krystsina Sazykina (BLR)	8
Ebru Dağbaşı (TUR)	0
Maya Nelson (USA)	7

Quarterfinals
Akie Hanai (JPN)	6
Baatarjavyn Shoovdor (MGL)	0
Krystsina Sazykina (BLR)	2
Maya Nelson (USA)	8^{F}

Semifinals
Akie Hanai (JPN)	4
Maya Nelson (USA)	1

=== Bottom half ===
Round of 32
Linda Morais (CAN)	9^{F}
Grace Bullen (NOR)	10

Round of 16
Bilyana Dudova (BUL)	10
Ineta Dantaitė (LTU)	0
Jowita Wrzesień (POL)	2
Johanna Lindborg (SWE)	8
Sandra Paruszewski (GER)	5
Oksana Kukhta (UKR)	3
Linda Morais (CAN)	4
Sarita Mor (IND)	8

Quarterfinals
Bilyana Dudova (BUL)	10
Johanna Lindborg (SWE)	0
Sandra Paruszewski (GER)	1
Sarita Mor (IND)	3

Semifinals
Bilyana Dudova (BUL)	3
Sarita Mor (IND)	0

=== Repechage ===
Repechage round 2
Diana Kayumova (KAZ)	0
Baatarjavyn Shoovdor (MGL)	6
Ineta Dantaitė (LTU)	0
Johanna Lindborg (SWE)	10

Bronze medals
Baatarjavyn Shoovdor (MGL)	4
Maya Nelson (USA)	3
Johanna Lindborg (SWE)	2
Sarita Mor (IND)	8

== Final standing ==
Rank	Athlete
1st place, gold medalist(s)	Bilyana Dudova (BUL)
2nd place, silver medalist(s)	Akie Hanai (JPN)
3rd place, bronze medalist(s)	Baatarjavyn Shoovdor (MGL)
3rd place, bronze medalist(s)	Sarita Mor (IND)
5	Maya Nelson (USA)
5	Johanna Lindborg (SWE)
7	Linda Morais (CAN)
8	Sandra Paruszewski (GER)
9	Krystsina Sazykina (BLR)
10	Alyona Kolesnik (AZE)
11	Oksana Kukhta (UKR)
12	Jowita Wrzesień (POL)
13	Svetlana Lipatova (RWF)
14	Grace Bullen (NOR)
15	Diana Kayumova (KAZ)
16	Ebru Dağbaşı (TUR)
17	Ineta Dantaitė (LTU)
