= Pei Xingru =

Chinese freestyle wrestler

Personal information
- Born: 11 October 1998 (age 27)

Sport
- Country: China
- Sport: Amateur wrestling
- Event: Freestyle
Medal record
Women's freestyle wrestling
Representing China
World Championships
Gold medal – first place	2016 Budapest	60 kg
Bronze medal – third place	2018 Budapest	59 kg
Bronze medal – third place	2019 Nur-Sultan	59 kg
Asian Championships
Gold medal – first place	2018 Bishkek	57 kg
Asian Indoor and Martial Arts Games
Gold medal – first place	2017 Ashgabat	58 kg
Asian Games
Silver medal – second place	2018 Jakarta–Palembang	57 kg
Summer Youth Olympics
Silver medal – second place	2014 Nanjing	60 kg

Pei Xingru (born 11 October 1998) is a Chinese freestyle wrestler. She won the gold medal in the women's 60 kg event at the 2016 World Wrestling Championships held in Budapest, Hungary. She also won one of the bronze medals both in the women's 59 kg event in 2018 and in the women's 59 kg event in 2019.

== Career ==
At the 2014 Summer Youth Olympics held in Nanjing, China, she won the silver medal in the girls' 60 kg event. In the final, she lost against Grace Bullen of Norway.

In 2017, she won the gold medal in the women's 58 kg event at the Asian Indoor and Martial Arts Games held in Ashgabat, Turkmenistan. The following year, she won the gold medal in the women's 57 kg event at the 2018 Asian Wrestling Championships held in Bishkek, Kyrgyzstan. In the same month, she also competed in the women's freestyle event as part of the 2018 Wrestling World Cup. Later that year, she won the silver medal in the women's 57 kg event at the 2018 Asian Games held in Jakarta and Palembang, Indonesia. In the final, she lost against Jong Myong-suk of North Korea.

== Achievements ==
Year	Tournament	Location	Result	Event
2016	World Championships	Budapest, Hungary	1st	Freestyle 60 kg
2017	Asian Indoor and Martial Arts Games	Ashgabat, Turkmenistan	1st	Freestyle 58 kg
2018	Asian Championships	Bishkek, Kyrgyzstan	1st	Freestyle 57 kg
2018	Asian Games	Jakarta, Indonesia	2nd	Freestyle 57 kg
2018	World Championships	Budapest, Hungary	3rd	Freestyle 59 kg
2019	World Championships	Nur-Sultan, Kazakhstan	3rd	Freestyle 59 kg
