= Wrestling at the 2018 Asian Games – Women's freestyle 57 kg =

Women's freestyle 57 kg at the 2018 Asian Games
- Venue: Jakarta Convention Center
- Date: 20 August 2018
- Competitors: 12 from 12 nations

Medalists
gold medal	Jong Myong-suk	North Korea
silver medal	Pei Xingru	China
bronze medal	Altantsetsegiin Battsetseg	Mongolia
bronze medal	Katsuki Sakagami	Japan

The women's freestyle 57 kilograms wrestling competition at the 2018 Asian Games in Jakarta was held on 20 August 2018 at the Jakarta Convention Center Assembly Hall.

== Schedule ==
All times are Western Indonesia Time (UTC+07:00)

Date	Time	Event
Monday, 20 August 2018	13:00	1/8 finals
Monday, 20 August 2018	13:00	Quarterfinals
Monday, 20 August 2018	13:00	Semifinals
Monday, 20 August 2018	13:00	Repechages
Monday, 20 August 2018	19:00	Finals

== Results ==
Legend

- F — Won by fall

=== Main bracket ===
1/8 finals
Pooja Dhanda (IND)	10
Orasa Sookdongyor (THA)	0
Nabira Esenbaeva (UZB)	7^{F}
Mutiara Ayuningtias (INA)	0
Dorn Srors (CAM)	0
Emma Tissina (KAZ)	4^{F}
Jong Myong-suk (PRK)	9
Katsuki Sakagami (JPN)	6

Quarterfinals
Altantsetsegiin Battsetseg (MGL)	13
Kiều Thị Ly (VIE)	1
Um Ji-eun (KOR)	4
Pei Xingru (CHN)	5^{F}
Pooja Dhanda (IND)	12
Nabira Esenbaeva (UZB)	1
Emma Tissina (KAZ)	0
Jong Myong-suk (PRK)	10

Semifinals
Altantsetsegiin Battsetseg (MGL)	1
Pei Xingru (CHN)	4
Pooja Dhanda (IND)	0
Jong Myong-suk (PRK)	10

Final
Pei Xingru (CHN)	4
Jong Myong-suk (PRK)	5

=== Repechage ===
Repechage round 1
Katsuki Sakagami (JPN)	11
Emma Tissina (KAZ)	0

Bronze medals
Um Ji-eun (KOR)	2
Altantsetsegiin Battsetseg (MGL)	5
Katsuki Sakagami (JPN)	6
Pooja Dhanda (IND)	1

== Final standing ==
Rank	Athlete
1st place, gold medalist(s)	Jong Myong-suk (PRK)
2nd place, silver medalist(s)	Pei Xingru (CHN)
3rd place, bronze medalist(s)	Altantsetsegiin Battsetseg (MGL)
3rd place, bronze medalist(s)	Katsuki Sakagami (JPN)
5	Um Ji-eun (KOR)
5	Pooja Dhanda (IND)
7	Nabira Esenbaeva (UZB)
8	Emma Tissina (KAZ)
9	Kiều Thị Ly (VIE)
10	Dorn Srors (CAM)
11	Mutiara Ayuningtias (INA)
12	Orasa Sookdongyor (THA)
