= List of Buryats =

This is a list of notable ethnic Buryats, sorted by field and last name regardless of citizenship / nationality.

Buryat ethnicity is associated with one's father's ethnicity alone. In case mother is of another ethnicity it is not specifically expressed.

Buryats are also sorted in Category:Buryat people. Territorially related are List of Mongolians, Category:People from Buryatia, Category:People from Zabaykalsky Krai.

== Scientists ==
- Byambyn Rinchen (1905–1977) — Mongolian linguist and historian, also fiction writer and poet
- Gombojab Tsybikov (1873–1930) — early photographer of Tibet, ethnographer and historian
- Tsyben Zhamtsarano (1881–1942) — ethnographer and historian, Corresponding Member of the Academy of the Soviet Union, also a politician in Russia and Mongolia, pan-mongolist

== Writers ==
- Bavasan Abiduev (1909–1940) — poet and one of the founders of Buryat children's literature
- Sengiin Erdene (1929–2000) — novelist from Mongolia

== Actors ==
- Valéry Inkijinoff (1895–1973) — film and theatre actor in the Soviet Union and France

Irina Pantaeva

- Irina Pantaeva (born 1967) — model and actress in Russia, Germany, and the U.S.
- Alexander Vampilov (1937–1972) — Russian playwright / screenwriter
- Yul Brynner (born Yuliy Borisovich Briner, Russian: Юлий Борисович Бринер; July 11, 1920 – October 10, 1985) — Russian-born film and stage actor of partial Buryat ancestry

== Musicians ==
- Namgar Lhasaranova — female singer, leader of traditional / ethno rock group Namgar

== Political figures ==
For politicians, only highest achieved positions are given in this list.

- Dashiin Byambasüren (born 1942) — Prime Minister of Mongolia

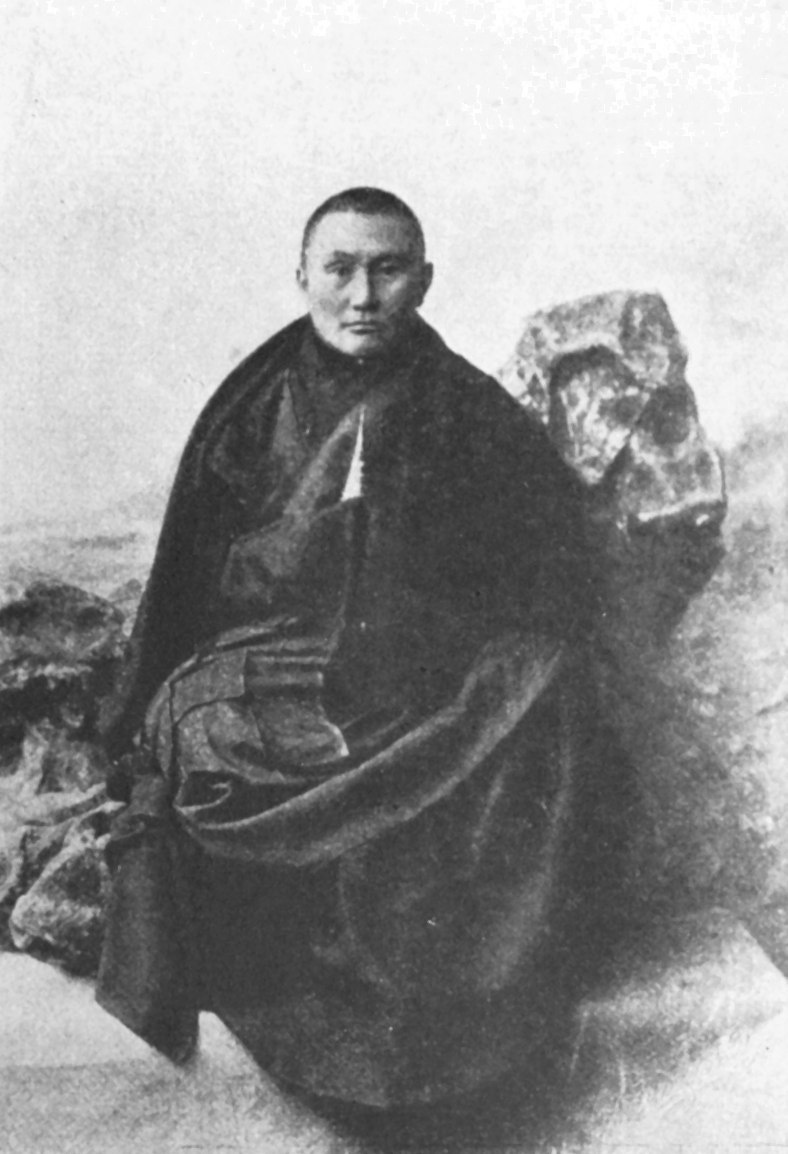
Dorzhiyev, before 1917 as Khambo Lama

- Agvan Dorzhiev (1854–1938) — Minister of Finance in Tibet
- Rinchingiin Elbegdorj (1888–1938) — Russian revolutionary, Mongolian Government member
- Yuriy Yekhanurov (born 1948) — Prime Minister of Ukraine
- Said Buryatsky (1982–2010) — Jihadist ideologue in Chechnya and Ingushetia
- Gunsyn Tsydenova (1909–1994) — Chairman of the Presidium of the Supreme Soviet of the Buryat-Mongol ASSR
- Bolot Ayushiyev
- Tsyren-Dashi Dorzhiev
- Sanjaasürengiin Zorig – pro-democracy leader and Minister of Infrastructure, assassinated in 1998
- Erdeniin Bat-Üül – Mongolian politician, democracy activist, former mayor of Ulaanbaatar

== Religious figures ==
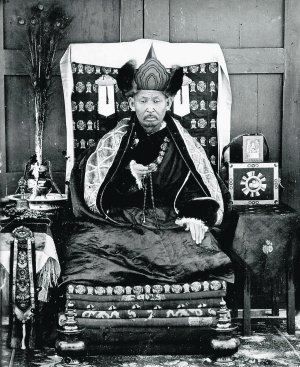
Lama Itigelov, before 1917

- Bidia Dandaron (1914–1974) — Buddhist teacher and writer in the Soviet Union
- Dashi-Dorzho Itigilov (1852–1927) — mummified Buddhist leader of Siberia

== Sportspeople ==
- Yuliya Adushnayeva — female taekwondo athlete, champion of the 2008 European Taekwondo Championships
- Oleg Aleksandrovich Alekseev — wrestler for the Soviet Union, champion of 1979 FILA Wrestling European Championships
- Bair Badënov (born 1976) — archer for Russia, bronze medalist of the 2008 Olympics
- Boris Baglayev — champion of the 2011 World Taekwondo Championships
- Aldar Balzhinimaev (born 1993) — Russian wrestler
- Velikton Barannikov (1938–2007) — boxer for the Soviet Union, bronze medalist of the 1964 Olympics
- Bazar Bazarguruev (born 1985) — freestyle wrestler for Kyrgyzstan, bronze medalist of the 2007 World Wrestling Championships
- Boris Budayev — freestyle wrestler for Soviet Union, champion of the 1989 FILA Wrestling World Championships
- Irina Ologonova (born 1990) — female freestyle wrestler for Russia, silver medalist of the 2014 World Wrestling Championships
- Natalia Bolotova (born 1963) — female archer for Russia, silver medalist of the 1993 World Championships
- Miroslava Dagbaeva (born 1987) — female archer for Mongolia
- Alexander Dambaev (born 1989) — archer for Russia, silver medalist of the 2013 World Championships.
- Tuyana Dashidorzhieva (born 1996) — female Russian archer
- Natalia Erdyniyeva (born 1988) — female archer for Russia, bronze medalist of the 2007 World Championships
- Sergey Khalmakshinov — champion of the IAAF World Championships in Athletics
- Inna Stepanova (born 1990) — female Russian archer
- Bolot Tsybzhitov (born 1994) — Russian archer
- Balzhinima Tsyrempilov (born 1975) — archer for Russia, silver medalist of the 2007 World Championships
- Bair Vanjilov — combat sambo athlete for Russia, champion of the World Sambo Championships
- Bato-Munko Vankeev (born 1977) — boxer from Belarus
- Vladimir Yesheyev (born 1958) — archer for the Soviet Union, world champion of 1987
- Orora Satoshi (born 1983) — sumo wrestler
- Lada Baglaeva (born 2000) female tennis player

== See also ==
- List of Mongolians
- List of Oirats
- ru:Портал:Бурятия/Список бурят (Russian-language listing with a lot of red links and list of sources)
