= Djimba Mikulinov =

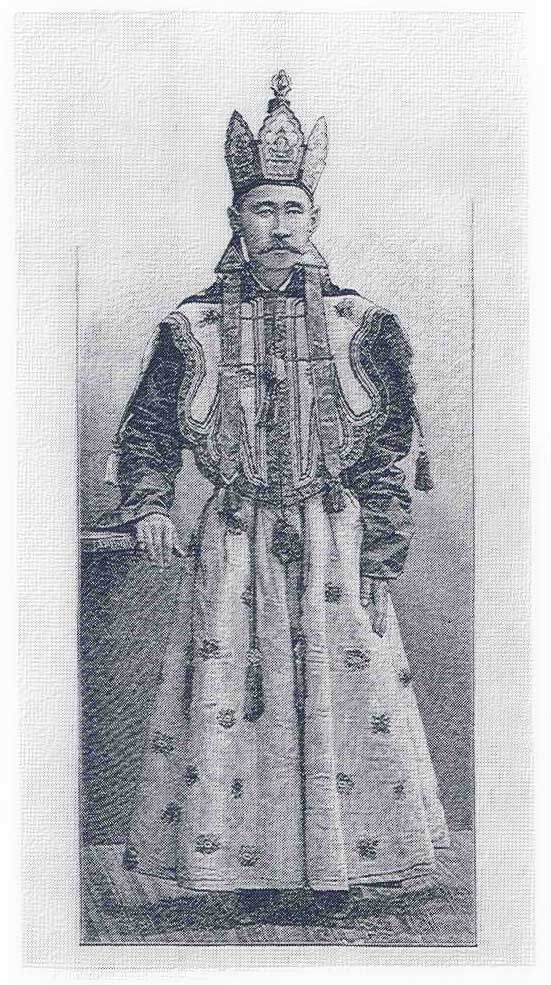
Djimba Mikulinov, Lama of the Don Kalmyks, 1894-1896

Djimba Mikulinov was a 19th-century Buddhist priest of Kalmyk origin who was most likely born in the Ike Burul aimak in the Salsk District of the Don Cossack Host. His dates of birth and death are unknown.

Djimba Mikulinov was the Baksha of the Ike Burul aimak when he was chosen to succeed Arkad Chubanov as the Lama of the Don Kalmyks in 1894. He was known as the controversial lama who served for only two years.

The controversy began two years after Mikulinov's appointment when he, his secretary and the ataman of the Ike Burul aimak were charged with forging the will of the late Lama Arkad Chubanov. According to local Don Cossack authorities, the provision in Arkad Chubanov's will nominating Djimba Mikulinov as his successor was forged. Therefore, Djimba Mikulinov's appointment was improper. The Russian court, however, ruled otherwise on all charges, freeing Djimba Mikulinov and his co-defendants, but his career as Lama of the Don Kalmyks was over.

It is believed the Don Cossack authorities and Russian Orthodox missionaries instigated the controversy to eliminate the institution of the head lama of the Don Kalmyks. Since Arkad Chubanov's reign, both entities have attempted on numerous occasions to close Don Kalmyk khuruls.

After his removal as the head lama, Mikulinov was not formally replaced until 1903, when Menko Bormanzhinov was elected to become the spiritual leader of the Don Kalmyks. During the intervening years, the Don Kalmyks were led by the Baksha of the Ike Burul aimak, Boka Kuliushov who acted as the deputy head lama.
