= Akie Hanai =

Japanese freestyle wrestler

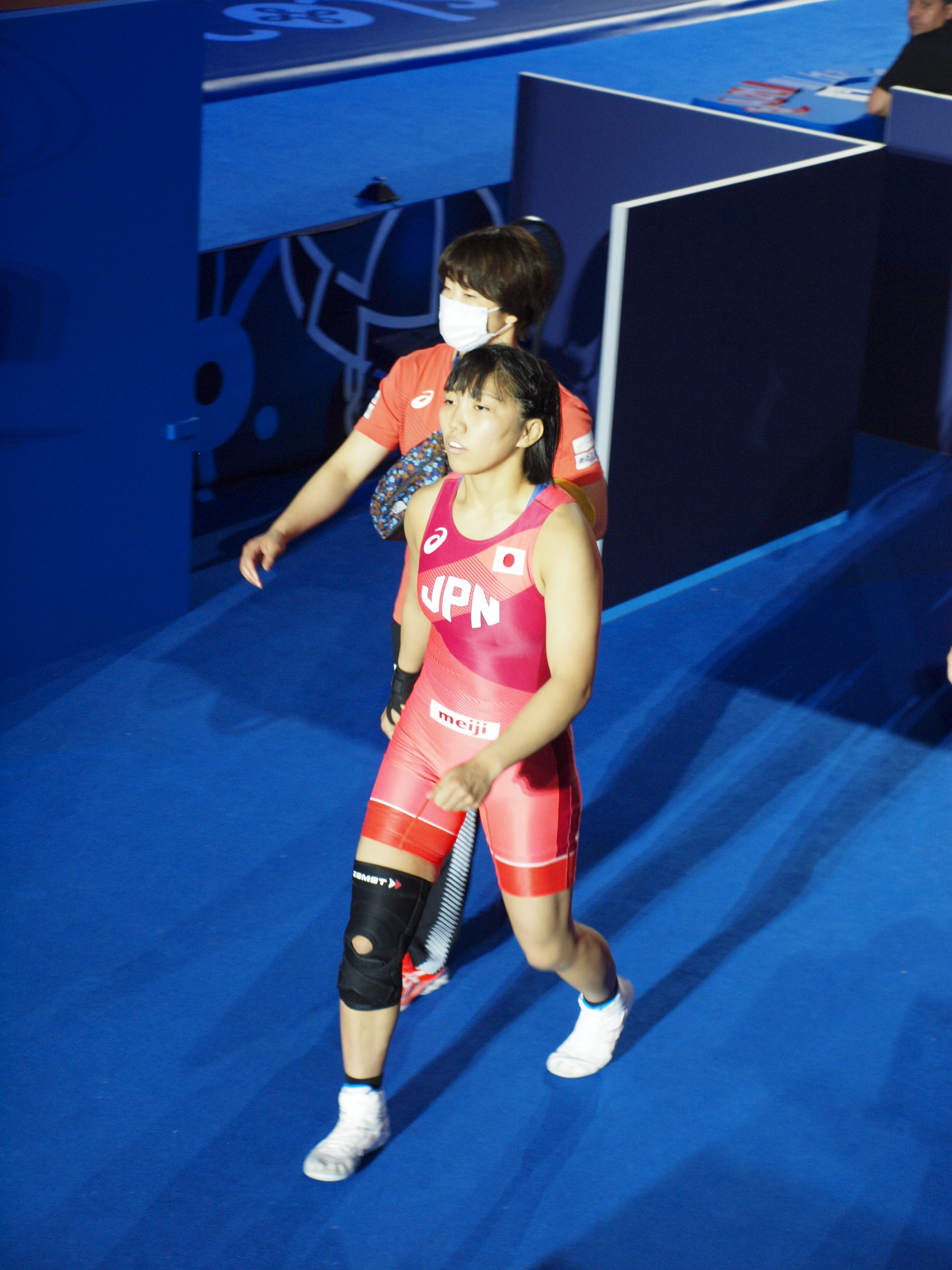
- Akie Hanai at the 2021 World Wrestling Championships in Oslo, Norway

Personal information
- Nationality: Japanese
- Born: 22 July 1999 (age 27)

Sport
- Country: Japan
- Event: Freestyle
Medal record
Women's freestyle wrestling
Representing Japan
World Championships
Silver medal – second place	2021 Oslo	59 kg
Asian Indoor and Martial Arts Games
Bronze medal – third place	2017 Ashgabat	58 kg
World U23 Championships
Silver medal – second place	2018 Bucharest	57 kg
Golden Grand Prix Ivan Yarygin
Bronze medal – third place	2017 Krasnoyarsk	58 kg

Akie Hanai (Japanese: 花井 瑛絵, born 22 July 1999) is a Japanese freestyle wrestler. She won the silver medal in the women's 59 kg event at the 2021 World Wrestling Championships in Oslo, Norway.
