= Wrestling at the 2018 Asian Games – Women's freestyle 62 kg =

Women's freestyle 62 kg at the 2018 Asian Games
- Venue: Jakarta Convention Center
- Date: 20 August 2018
- Competitors: 11 from 11 nations

Medalists
gold medal	Aisuluu Tynybekova	Kyrgyzstan
silver medal	Risako Kawai	Japan
bronze medal	Nguyễn Thị Mỹ Hạnh	Vietnam
bronze medal	Rim Jong-sim	North Korea

The women's freestyle 62 kilograms wrestling competition at the 2018 Asian Games in Jakarta was held on 20 August 2018 at the Jakarta Convention Center Assembly Hall.

On 3 September 2018, it was announced that Pürevdorjiin Orkhon had tested positive for stanozolol in a urine test conducted on 20 August 2018. Orkhon was disqualified and stripped of her gold medal.

== Schedule ==
All times are Western Indonesia Time (UTC+07:00)

Date	Time	Event
Monday, 20 August 2018	13:00	1/8 finals
Monday, 20 August 2018	13:00	Quarterfinals
Monday, 20 August 2018	13:00	Semifinals
Monday, 20 August 2018	13:00	Repechages
Monday, 20 August 2018	19:00	Finals

== Results ==
Legend

- F — Won by fall

=== Main bracket ===
1/8 finals
Aisuluu Tynybekova (KGZ)	6
Rim Jong-sim (PRK)	6
Sakshi Malik (IND)	10
Salinee Srisombat (THA)	0
Dewi Atiya (INA)	0
Ayaulym Kassymova (KAZ)	10

Quarterfinals
Nguyễn Thị Mỹ Hạnh (VIE)	0
Pürevdorjiin Orkhon (MGL)	4^{F}
Hang Jung-won (KOR)	1
Risako Kawai (JPN)	12
Xu Rui (CHN)	0
Aisuluu Tynybekova (KGZ)	3
Sakshi Malik (IND)	10
Ayaulym Kassymova (KAZ)	0

Semifinals
Pürevdorjiin Orkhon (MGL)	2^{F}
Risako Kawai (JPN)	2
Aisuluu Tynybekova (KGZ)	9
Sakshi Malik (IND)	7

Final
Pürevdorjiin Orkhon (MGL)	11
Aisuluu Tynybekova (KGZ)	0

=== Repechage ===
Repechage round 1
Rim Jong-sim (PRK)	10
Xu Rui (CHN)	0

Bronze medals
Nguyễn Thị Mỹ Hạnh (VIE)	0
Risako Kawai (JPN)	10
Rim Jong-sim (PRK)	12
Sakshi Malik (IND)	2

== Final standing ==
Rank	Athlete
1st place, gold medalist(s)	Aisuluu Tynybekova (KGZ)
2nd place, silver medalist(s)	Risako Kawai (JPN)
3rd place, bronze medalist(s)	Nguyễn Thị Mỹ Hạnh (VIE)
3rd place, bronze medalist(s)	Rim Jong-sim (PRK)
5	Sakshi Malik (IND)
6	Ayaulym Kassymova (KAZ)
7	Hang Jung-won (KOR)
8	Dewi Atiya (INA)
8	Salinee Srisombat (THA)
10	Xu Rui (CHN)
DQ	Pürevdorjiin Orkhon (MGL)

- Pürevdorjiin Orkhon of Mongolia originally won the gold medal, but was disqualified after she tested positive for Stanozolol.
