= 2016 World Wrestling Championships =

- Host city: Budapest, Hungary
- Dates: 10–11 December 2016
- Stadium: SYMA Sports and Conference Centre

The 2016 UWW World Wrestling Championships for non-Olympic weights were held from December 10 to 11 in SYMA Sports and Conference Centre, Budapest, Hungary.

== Medal table ==
Rank	Nation	Gold	Silver	Bronze	Total
1	Russia	2	1	1	4
2	United States	1	1	0	2
3	Hungary	1	0	2	3
4	China	1	0	0	1
4	Japan	1	0	0	1
6	Kazakhstan	0	1	1	2
7	Georgia	0	1	0	1
7	Moldova	0	1	0	1
7	Turkey	0	1	0	1
10	Azerbaijan	0	0	2	2
11	Canada	0	0	1	1
11	Iran	0	0	1	1
11	Kyrgyzstan	0	0	1	1
11	Mongolia	0	0	1	1
11	Romania	0	0	1	1
11	Uzbekistan	0	0	1	1
Totals (16 entries)		6	6	12	24

== Medal summary ==
=== Men's freestyle ===
Event	Gold	Silver	Bronze
61 kg	Logan Stieber; United States	Beka Lomtadze; Georgia	Akhmed Chakaev; Russia
61 kg	Logan Stieber; United States	Beka Lomtadze; Georgia	Akhmednabi Gvarzatilov; Azerbaijan
70 kg	Magomed Kurbanaliev; Russia	Nurlan Bekzhanov; Kazakhstan	Elaman Dogdurbek Uulu; Kyrgyzstan
70 kg	Magomed Kurbanaliev; Russia	Nurlan Bekzhanov; Kazakhstan	Mostafa Hosseinkhani; Iran

=== Men's Greco-Roman ===
Event	Gold	Silver	Bronze
71 kg	Bálint Korpási; Hungary	Daniel Cataraga; Moldova	Hasan Aliyev; Azerbaijan
71 kg	Bálint Korpási; Hungary	Daniel Cataraga; Moldova	Ilie Cojocari; Romania
80 kg	Ramazan Abacharaev; Russia	Aslan Atem; Turkey	Jonibek Otabekov; Uzbekistan
80 kg	Ramazan Abacharaev; Russia	Aslan Atem; Turkey	László Szabó; Hungary

=== Women's freestyle ===
Event	Gold	Silver	Bronze
55 kg	Mayu Mukaida; Japan	Irina Ologonova; Russia	Aiyim Abdildina; Kazakhstan
55 kg	Mayu Mukaida; Japan	Irina Ologonova; Russia	Davaasükhiin Otgontsetseg; Mongolia
60 kg	Pei Xingru; China	Alli Ragan; United States	Emese Barka; Hungary
60 kg	Pei Xingru; China	Alli Ragan; United States	Linda Morais; Canada

== Participating nations ==
142 competitors from 37 nations participated.

- Algeria (1)
- Armenia (4)
- Austria (2)
- Azerbaijan (6)
- Belarus (6)
- Bulgaria (6)
- Canada (2)
- China (5)
- Chinese Taipei (2)
- Croatia (2)
- Czech Republic (2)
- Estonia (1)
- Finland (1)
- France (4)
- Georgia (4)
- Germany (6)
- Greece (1)
- Hungary (6)
- India (6)
- Iran (4)
- Japan (6)
- Kazakhstan (6)
- Kyrgyzstan (4)
- Moldova (5)
- Mongolia (4)
- Palau (1)
- Poland (6)
- Romania (4)
- Russia (6)
- Serbia (2)
- Slovakia (2)
- Sweden (2)
- Tajikistan (1)
- Turkey (6)
- Ukraine (6)
- United States (6)
- Uzbekistan (4)

== See also ==
- Wrestling at the 2016 Summer Olympics
