= Katsuki Sakagami =

Japanese freestyle wrestler

Personal information
- Born: 7 November 1992 (age 33)

Sport
- Country: Japan
- Sport: Amateur wrestling
- Event: Freestyle
Medal record
Women's freestyle wrestling
Representing Japan
Asian Games
Bronze medal – third place	2018 Jakarta	57 kg
Asian Championships
Bronze medal – third place	2017 New Delhi	58 kg
Golden Grand Prix Ivan Yarygin
Gold medal – first place	2017 Krasnoyarsk	60 kg

Katsuki Sakagami (born 7 November 1992) is a Japanese freestyle wrestler. She won one of the bronze medals in the women's freestyle 57 kg event at the 2018 Asian Games held in Jakarta, Indonesia.

In 2013, she won the silver medal in the women's 58 kg freestyle event in belt wrestling at the Summer Universiade held in Kazan, Russia.

At the 2017 Asian Wrestling Championships held in New Delhi, India, she won one of the bronze medals in the women's 58 kg event.

== Achievements ==
Year	Tournament	Location	Result	Event
2017	Asian Championships	New Delhi, India	3rd	Freestyle 58 kg
2018	Asian Games	Jakarta, Indonesia	3rd	Freestyle 57 kg
