= Shurguchi Nimgirov =

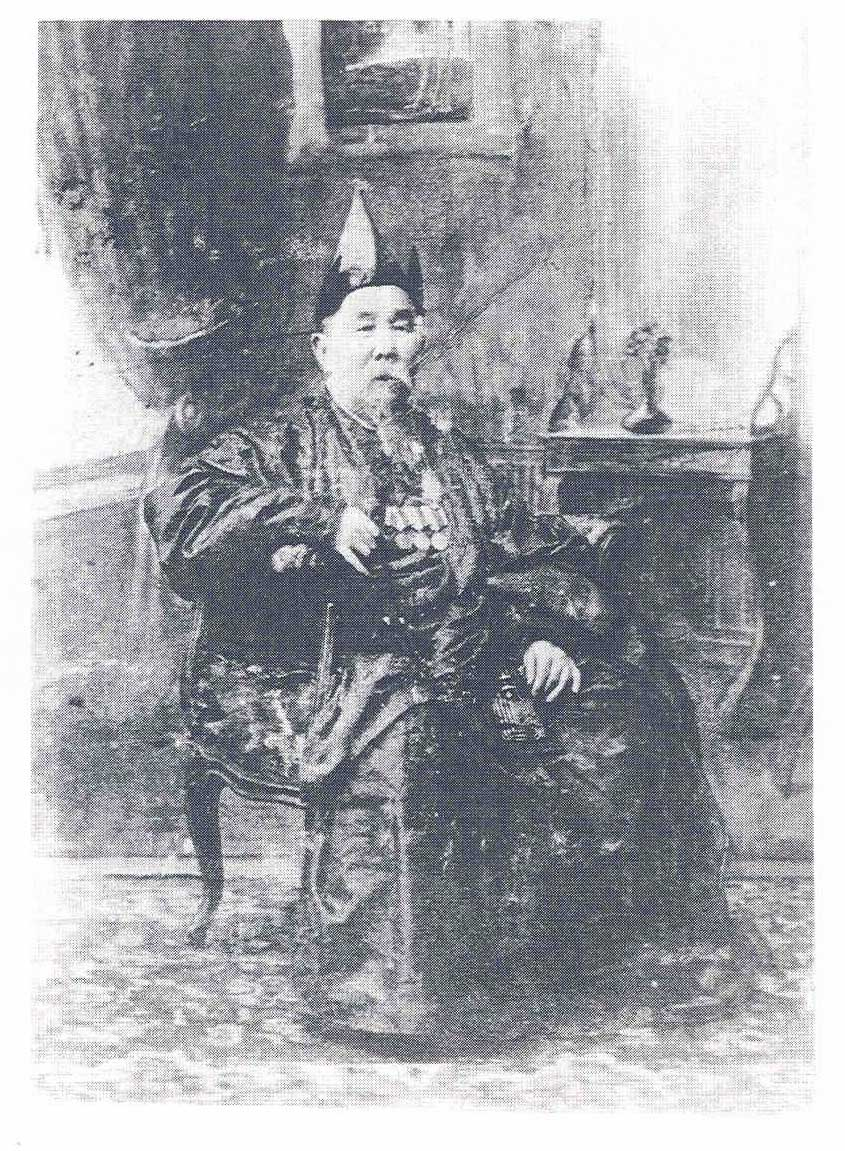
Shurguchi Nimgirov, Lama of the Don Kalmyks, 1919-1920

Shurguchi Nimgirov (died 1920) was a Buddhist priest of Kalmyk origin who was born in the Bayuda aimak (Batlaevskaia stanista) in the Salsk District of the Don Cossack Host.

Lama Nimgirov was Baksha of the khurul in the Bayuda aimak when, in 1919, he succeeded Menko Bormanzhinov as "Lama of the Don Kalmyks." One year later, Lama Nimgirov fled from the Bolsheviks to a refugee camp on Lemnos, an island in the northern part of the Aegean Sea where he later died from advanced age. He was succeeded as Lama of the Don Kalmyks by Ivan Bultinovich Kitanov, the Baksha of the khurul in the Beliavin aimak .
