= Altantsetsegiin Battsetseg =

Mongolian freestyle wrestler

Personal information
- Born: 6 August 1994 (age 31)
- Height: 159 cm (5 ft 3 in)
- Weight: 60 kg (132 lb)

Sport
- Country: Mongolia
- Sport: Amateur wrestling
- Weight class: 57 kg
- Event: Freestyle
- Team: Mongolia
Medal record
Women's freestyle wrestling
Representing Mongolia
Asian Games
Bronze medal – third place	2018 Jakarta–Palembang	57 kg

Altantsetsegiin Battsetseg (born 6 August 1994) is a Mongolian freestyle wrestler. In 2018, she won one of the bronze medals in the women's 57 kg event at the 2018 Asian Games held in Jakarta and Palembang, Indonesia.

In 2020, Battsetseg won the silver medal in the 59 kg event at the 2020 Asian Wrestling Championships in New Delhi, India.

== Major results ==
Year	Tournament	Location	Result	Event
2018	Asian Games	Jakarta, Indonesia	3rd	Freestyle 57 kg
