= Ivan Bultinovich Kitanov =

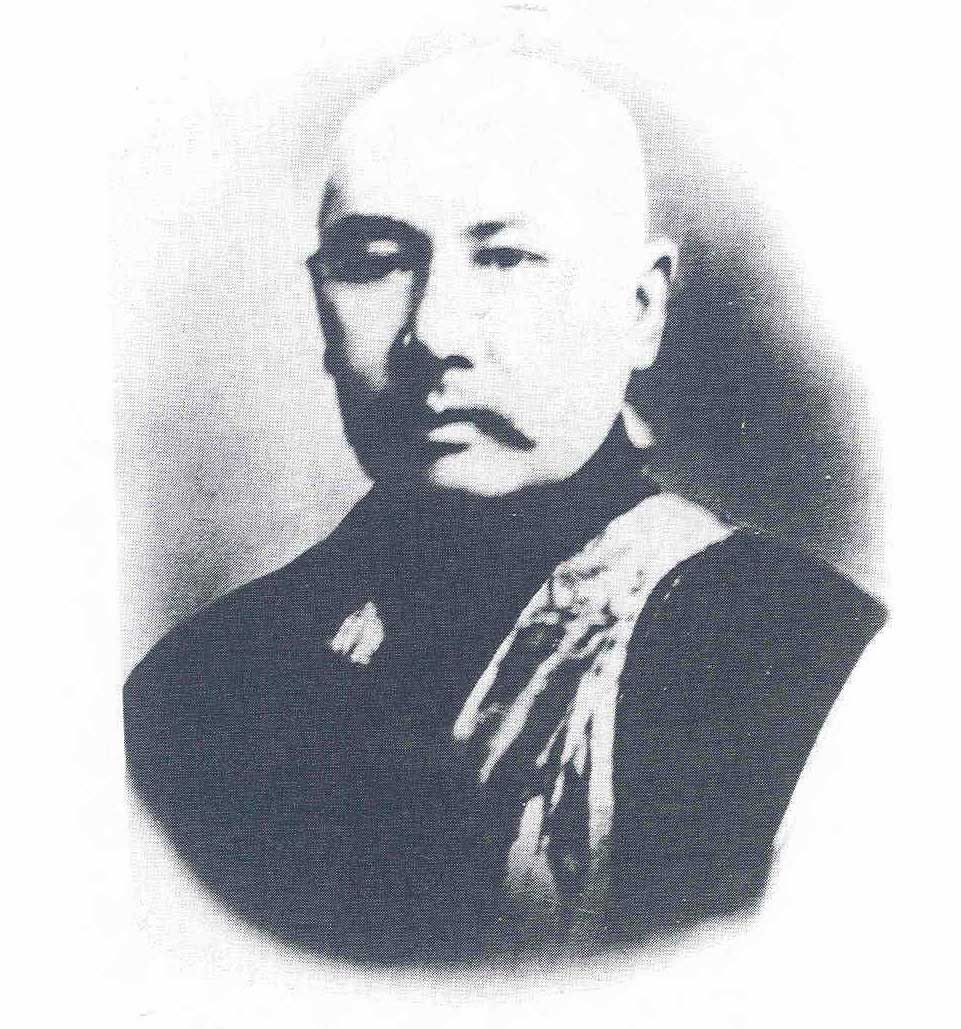
Gavang Arash Kitanov, Lama of the Don Kalmyks, 1920-1925

Ivan Bultinovich Kitanov (1858–1926) was a Buddhist priest of Kalmyk origin who was born in the Beliavin aimak (Beliaevskaia stanitsa) in the Salsk District of the Don Cossack Host.

Lama Kitanov was born in the lunar year of the sheep sometime in 1858. By the age of 27, he became the Baksha of the khurul in his native aimak. His flock knew him by his ecclesiastic name, "Gavang Arash." In 1920, Gavang Arash succeeded Shurguchi Nimgirov as the "Lama of the Don Kalmyks" and was the last person to officially hold that title. Gavang Arash held that position until 1925 when he was forced to resign due to the anti-religion policies of the Bolsheviks in the Don Host. One year later in the lunar year of the tiger (1926), Gavang Arash died at the age of 68 on the 25th day of the Tsagaan Sar.
