= Menko Bormanzhinov =

Kalmyk Buddhist lama (1855–1919)

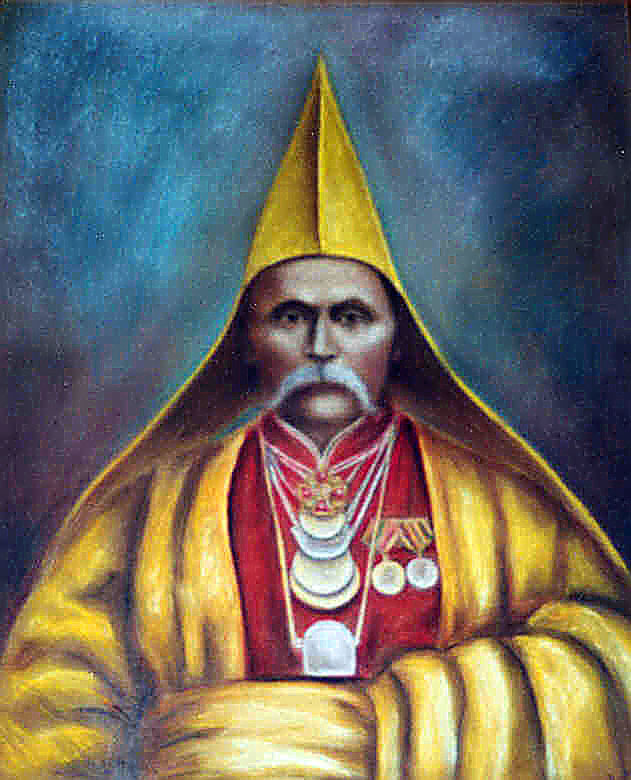
- Portrait of Bormanzhinov by Alexander Burtschinow

Lama of the Don Kalmyks
- In office 1903 – April 1919
- Succeeded by: Shurguchi Nimgirov

Personal life
- Born: 1855 Don Cossack Host, Russian Empire
- Died: April 1919 (aged 63–64)

Religious life
- Religion: Tibetan Buddhism

Senior posting
- Teacher: Djimba Gandjinov; Sandji Yavanov

Menko Bormanzhinov (Russian: Менько Борманжинов, 1855 – April 1919) was a Kalmyk Buddhist lama who was born in the Bokshirgankan aimak in the Salsk District of the Don Cossack Host sometime in 1855.

Lama Bormanzhinov was born to Bakar and Djindeng Bormanzhinov in the year of the wood-hare. At age 12 in 1867, he began studying to become a monk under lama Djimba Gandjinov. After the death of Gandjinov in 1869, Bormanzhinov studied in the Bolshederbotovskii ulus under the guidance of Sandji Yavanov, the Ochir Lama.

In 1883, Bormanzhinov became Baksha of his native khurul. He remained in that position until 1903, when he was elected Lama of the Don Kalmyks - the spiritual leader of the Kalmyk community in the Salsk District of the Don Cossack Host.

Bormanzhinov was noted for promoting public education among the Don Kalmyks. He also followed Ochir Lama and Arkad Chubanov in publishing the lunar calendar. Moreover, both he and Lubsan Sharab Tepkin were responsible for the publication of at least 12 titles of sacred Buddhist text in the Kalmyk language.

Bormanzhinov died of typhus in April 1919 after returning to his native aimak from a refugee camp in the Kuban, where he fled persecution from the Bolsheviks. He was succeeded as Lama of the Don Kalmyks by Shurguchi Nimgirov, the Baksha of the khurul in the Bayuda aimak.
