= Chimid Baldanov =

Buddhist priest of Kalmyk origin

Chimid Baldanov (Russian: Чимид Балданов, born c. 1844) was a Buddhist priest of Kalmyk origin. He was elected religious head of the Kalmyks by leaders of the Kalmyk community at a Kalmyk Congress, which assembled after the February Revolution on March 25, 1917, and on July 23–25, 1917, to discuss spiritual, cultural, and economic issues.
