= Lubsan Sharab Tepkin =

Kalmyk Buddhist religious leader; 11th Šajin Lama from 1925 to 1931 (1875–1941?)

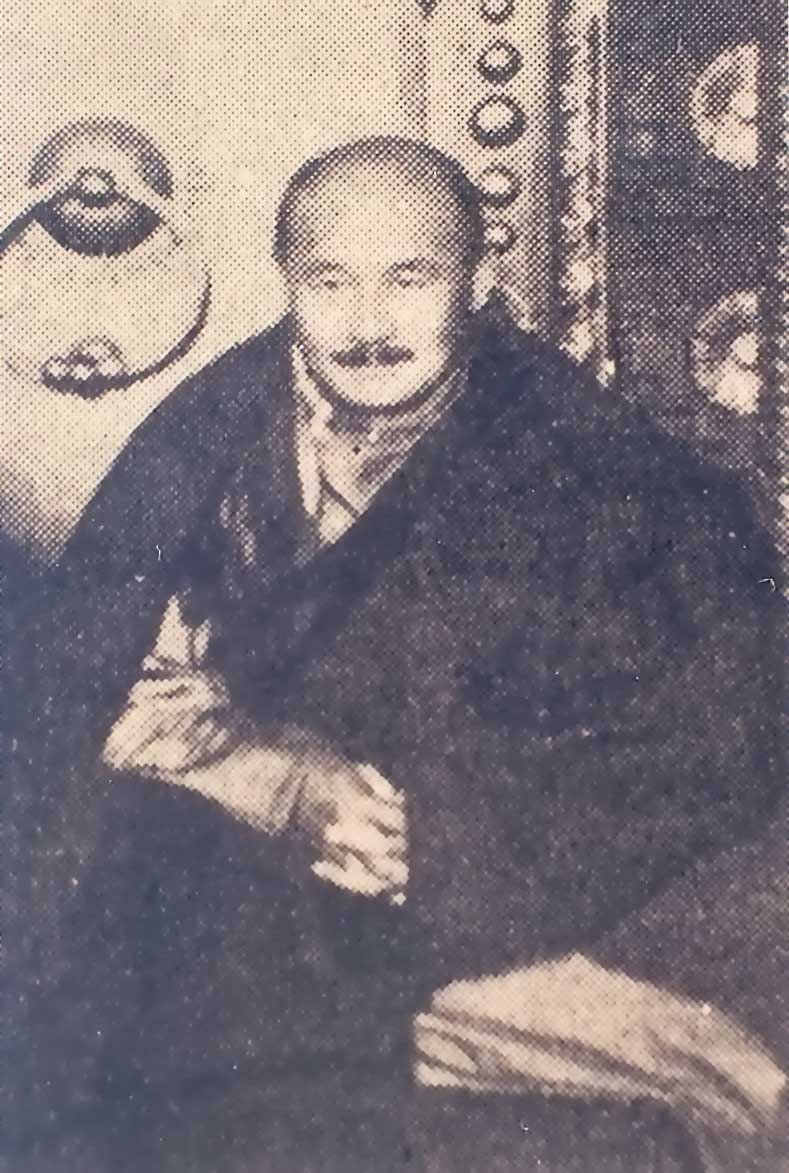

11th Šajin Lama
- In office 1925–1931

Personal life
- Born: 1875 Denisovsky, Russian Empire
- Died: After 1941 (aged 65–66) Near Tashkent, Uzbek SSR, Soviet Union

Religious life
- Religion: Tibetan Buddhism

Senior posting
- Predecessor: Chempel Basliyev
- Successor: Position abolished Erdne Ombadykow (1992)

Lubsan Sharab Tepkin (Russian: Лувсан-Шарап Тепкин, romanized: Luvsan-Sharap Tepkin; 1875 – after 1941) was a Kalmyk Buddhist lama who served as the 11th Šajin Lama, serving from 1925 to 1931. He was later arrested by the NKVD and was last heard of in 1941.

== Biography ==
Lubsan Tepkin was born to Dandun Tepkin, a horsebreeder and a member of a prominent family. He joined the Kalmyk clergy at a young age and became Baksha of the khurul in his native aimak by the age of 28 in 1903. In so doing, Lama Tepkin replaced Menko Bormanzhinov who became lama of the Don Kalmyks. In 1911, Tepkin abdicated his position and moved to Tibet, where he would remain until the autumn of 1922.

Tepkin moved to Petrograd in the autumn of 1922 to become a deputy Tibetan envoy and a lecturer in Mongolian and Tibetan at the Leningrad Institute of Oriental Living Languages. Three years later in 1925, Lama Tepkin traveled to the Kalmyk Autonomous Oblast to attend the second conference of the Kalmyk Buddhist clergy where he was elected Šajin Lama of the Kalmyk people.

Tepkin held the position of Šajin Lama until his arrest by the NKVD in 1931. He was sentenced to imprisonment without a formal trial by an NKVD tribunal. Tepkin reportedly spent the last years of his life working as a clerk on a dairy farm near Tashkent, where he was last heard of in 1941.
