= Alli Ragan =

American freestyle wrestler

Personal information
- Full name: Allison Mackenzie Ragan
- Born: June 16, 1992 (age 34)

Sport
- Country: United States
- Sport: Amateur wrestling
- Event: Freestyle
Medal record
Women's freestyle wrestling
Representing United States
World Championships
Silver medal – second place	2016 Budapest	60 kg
Silver medal – second place	2017 Paris	60 kg
Pan American Championships
Gold medal – first place	2017 Lauro de Freitas	60 kg
Golden Grand Prix Ivan Yarygin
Silver medal – second place	2018 Krasnoyarsk	59 kg
Bronze medal – third place	2017 Krasnoyarsk	60 kg
World University Games
Silver medal – second place	2013 Kazan	59 kg
Junior World Championships
Bronze medal – third place	2011 Bucarest	63 kg
Bronze medal – third place	2012 Thailand	63 kg

Alli Ragan (born June 16, 1992) is an American freestyle wrestler. She is a two-time silver medalist at the World Wrestling Championships.

== Career ==
In 2013, Ragan represented the United States at the Summer Universiade and she won the silver medal in the women's 59 kg event.

Ragan won the silver medal in the women's freestyle 60 kg event at the 2016 World Wrestling Championships held in Budapest, Hungary and in that same event at the 2017 World Wrestling Championships held in Paris, France.

In April 2026, Ragan was named the first head coach of the Iowa State University women's wrestling program.

== Achievements ==
Year	Tournament	Location	Result	Event
2016	World Championships	Budapest, Hungary	2nd	Freestyle 60 kg
2017	World Championships	Paris, France	2nd	Freestyle 60 kg
