= Sarita Mor =

Indian freestyle wrestler

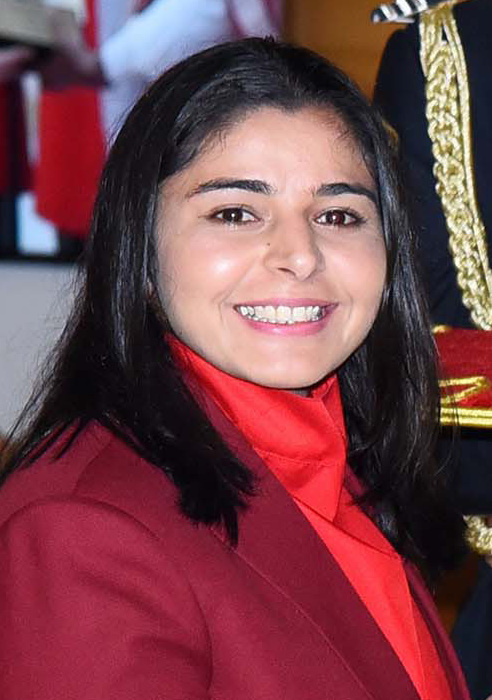
- Mor in 2022

Personal information
- Born: 16 April 1995 (age 31) Sonipat district, Haryana, India
- Weight: 59 kg (130 lb)
- Spouse: Rahul Mann

Sport
- Country: India
- Sport: Freestyle wrestling
- Event: 59 kg
- Partner: Rahul Mann
Medal record
Women's freestyle wrestling
Representing India
World Championships
Bronze medal – third place	2021 Oslo	59 kg
Asian Championships
Gold medal – first place	2021 Almaty	59 kg
Gold medal – first place	2020 New Delhi	59 kg
Silver medal – second place	2017 New Delhi	58 kg
Bronze medal – third place	2022 Ulaanbaatar	59 kg

Sarita Mor (born 16 April 1995) is an Indian freestyle wrestler. Highest world ranking 1

== Career ==
She won the silver medal at the 2017 Asian Wrestling Championships in the 58 kg weight class and the gold medal at the 2020 Asian Wrestling Championships in the 59 kg weight class.

In 2021, she won the silver medal in the 57 kg event at the Matteo Pellicone Ranking Series 2021 held in Rome, Italy. She also won the bronze medal at the 2021 World Wrestling Championships held in Oslo, Norway. She competed in the 57 kg event at the 2022 World Wrestling Championships held in Belgrade, Serbia.

== Personal life ==
Sarita Mor is from Sonipat district in Haryana. She started playing kabaddi and wrestling in her school when she was 12. She works with the Indian Railways. She is married to Rahul Maan, she gave birth to baby boy on 7 October 2025.
