= Nguyễn Thị Mỹ Hạnh =

Vietnamese freestyle wrestler

Personal information
- Born: 28 September 1997 (age 29)

Sport
- Country: Vietnam
- Sport: Amateur wrestling
- Weight class: 62 kg
- Event: Freestyle
Medal record
Women's freestyle wrestling
Representing Vietnam
Asian Games
Bronze medal – third place	2018 Jakarta	62 kg
Asian Beach Games
Bronze medal – third place	2026 Sanya	60 kg
Southeast Asian Games
Gold medal – first place	2019 Philippines	62 kg
Gold medal – first place	2023 Phnom Penh	62 kg

Nguyễn Thị Mỹ Hạnh (born 28 September 1997) is a Vietnamese freestyle wrestler. She is a gold medalist at the Southeast Asian Games and a bronze medalist at the Asian Games.

== Career ==
She won one of the bronze medals in the women's freestyle 62 kg event at the 2018 Asian Games held in Jakarta, Indonesia.

In 2019, she won the gold medal in the women's 62 kg event at the Southeast Asian Games held in the Philippines. She again won the gold medal at the 2023 Southeast Asian Games in the 62 kg event.

== Achievements ==
Year	Tournament	Location	Result	Event
2018	Asian Games	Jakarta, Indonesia	3rd	Freestyle 62 kg
2019	Southeast Asian Games	Philippines	1st	Freestyle 62 kg
2023	Southeast Asian Games	Phnom Penh, Cambodia	1st	Freestyle 62 kg
