= Baatarjavyn Shoovdor =

Mongolian freestyle wrestler

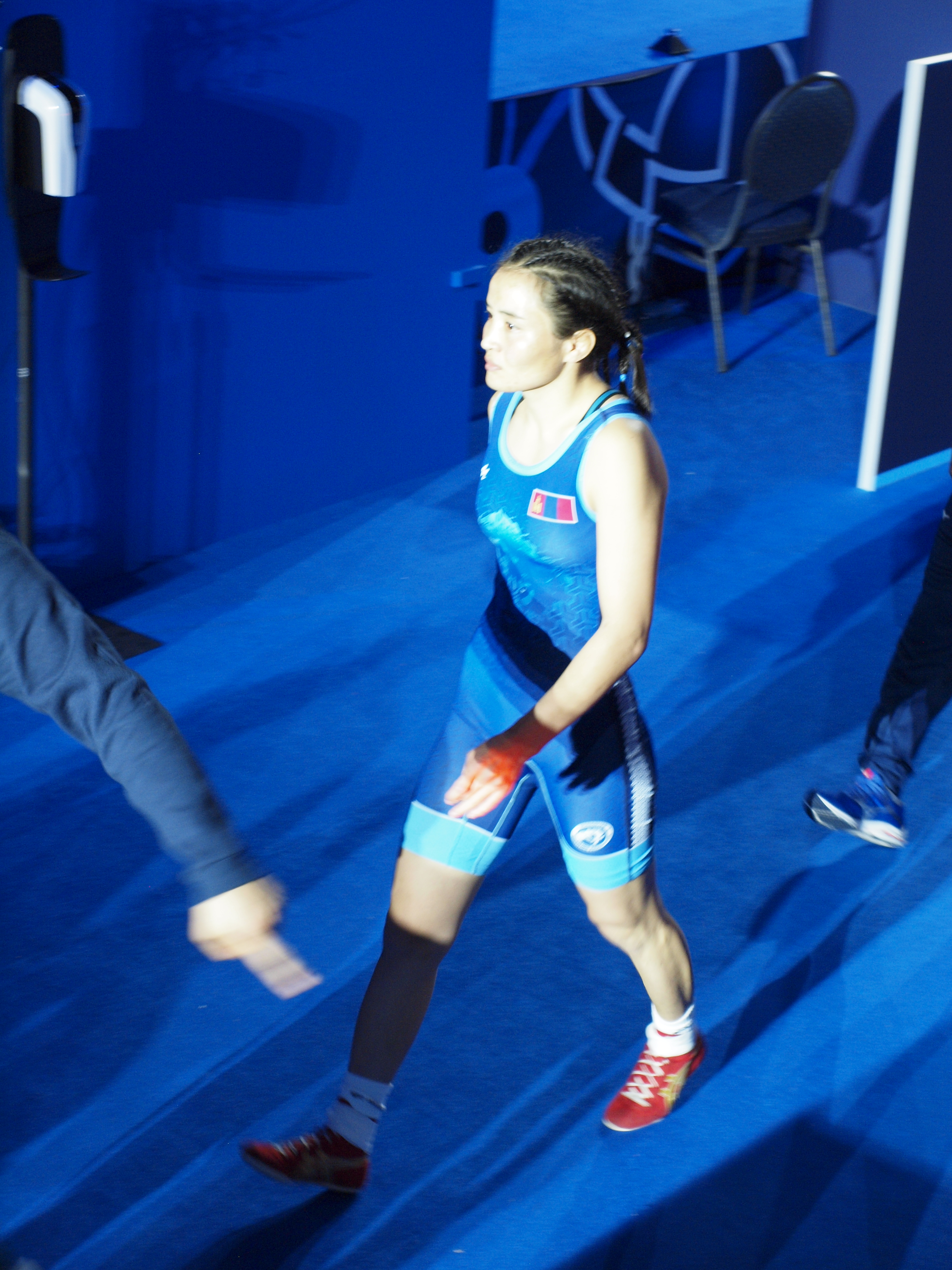
- Baatarjavyn Shoovdor at the 2021 World Wrestling Championships in Oslo, Norway

Personal information
- Native name: Баатаржавын Шоовдор
- Nationality: Mongolia
- Born: 20 November 1990 (age 35)
- Height: 168 cm (5 ft 6 in)

Sport
- Country: Mongolia
- Sport: Amateur wrestling
- Weight class: 59 kg
- Event: Freestyle
- Coached by: Batnyam

Achievements and titles
- World finals: 5th (2017)
Medal record
Women's freestyle wrestling
Representing Mongolia
World Championships
Bronze medal – third place	2021 Oslo	59 kg
Bronze medal – third place	2019 Nur-Sultan	59 kg
Bronze medal – third place	2018 Budapest	59 kg
World Cup
Bronze medal – third place	2018 Takasaki	59 kg
Bronze medal – third place	2015 St.Petersburg	58 kg
Asian Championships
Silver medal – second place	2022 Ulaanbaatar	59 kg
Silver medal – second place	2021 Almaty	59 kg
Silver medal – second place	2014 Astana	58 kg
Bronze medal – third place	2018 Bishkek	59 kg
Golden Grand Prix Ivan Yarygin
Gold medal – first place	2021 Krasnoyarsk	59 kg
Gold medal – first place	2020 Krasnoyarsk	59 kg
Gold medal – first place	2015 Krasnoyarsk	58 kg
Bronze medal – third place	2016 Krasnoyarsk	58 kg
Bronze medal – third place	2022 Krasnoyarsk	59 kg

Baatarjavyn Shoovdor (Mongolian: Баатаржавын Шоовдор; born 20 November 1990) is a Mongolian freestyle wrestler. She is a three-time bronze medalist at the World Wrestling Championships.

== Career ==
At the 2014 Asian Wrestling Championships she won the silver medal in the women's 58 kg event. At the 2018 Asian Wrestling Championships she won one of the bronze medals in the women's 59 kg event.

At the 2019 World Wrestling Championships held in Nur-Sultan, Kazakhstan, she won one of the bronze medals in the women's 59 kg event. She also won one of the bronze medals in this event at the 2018 World Wrestling Championships held in Budapest, Hungary.

At the Golden Grand Prix Ivan Yarygin 2020 held in Krasnoyarsk, Russia, she won the gold medal in the women's 59 kg event. In 2022, she won one of the bronze medals in the women's 59 kg event at the Golden Grand Prix Ivan Yarygin held in Krasnoyarsk, Russia.

== Achievements ==
Year	Tournament	Location	Result	Event
2014	Asian Championships	Astana, Kazakhstan	2nd	Freestyle 58 kg
2018	Asian Championships	Bishkek, Kyrgyzstan	3rd	Freestyle 59 kg
2018	World Championships	Budapest, Hungary	3rd	Freestyle 59 kg
2019	World Championships	Nur-Sultan, Kazakhstan	3rd	Freestyle 59 kg
2021	Asian Championships	Almaty, Kazakhstan	2nd	Freestyle 59 kg
2021	World Championships	Oslo, Norway	3rd	Freestyle 59 kg
2022	Asian Championships	Ulaanbaatar, Mongolia	2nd	Freestyle 59 kg
