= Risako Kinjo =

Japanese freestyle wrestler

Risako Kinjo 金城 梨沙子
- Kinjo in 2021

Personal information
- Nationality: Japanese
- Born: 21 November 1994 (age 31) Tsubata, Ishikawa Prefecture, Japan
- Height: 160 cm (5 ft 3 in) (2016)
- Weight: 61 kg (134 lb) (2016)

Sport
- Country: Japan
- Sport: Wrestling
- Event: Freestyle
Medal record
Women's freestyle wrestling
Representing Japan
Olympic Games
Gold medal – first place	2016 Rio de Janeiro	63 kg
Gold medal – first place	2020 Tokyo	57 kg
World Championships
Gold medal – first place	2017 Paris	60 kg
Gold medal – first place	2018 Budapest	59 kg
Gold medal – first place	2019 Nur-Sultan	57 kg
Gold medal – first place	2024 Tirana	59 kg
Silver medal – second place	2015 Las Vegas	63 kg
Asian Championships
Gold medal – first place	2014 Astana	63 kg
Gold medal – first place	2016 Bangkok	63 kg
Gold medal – first place	2017 New Delhi	60 kg
Gold medal – first place	2020 New Delhi	57 kg
Bronze medal – third place	2024 Bishkek	59 kg
Asian Games
Silver medal – second place	2018 Jakarta	62 kg

Risako Kinjo (金城 梨沙子, Kinjo Risako; née Kawai) is a Japanese wrestler. She is a two-time gold medalist at the Olympic Games, a three-time gold medalist at the World Wrestling Championships and a four-time gold medalist at the Asian Wrestling Championships.

She finished second at the 2015 World Wrestling Championships in Las Vegas and represented her country at the 2016 Summer Olympics, where she won the first of her Olympic gold medals, by defeating Maria Mamashuk of Belarus 3-0.

She celebrated her Olympic gold medal victory by delivering two fireman's carry takedowns to her coach (Kazuhito Sakae).

Kawai's Olympic gold was one of four won by Japan's women's wrestling team at the 2016 Rio games.

In 2021, Kawai won the gold medal in the 57 kg wrestling division at the Tokyo Olympics. Her younger sister Yukako had won gold in the 62 kg division the previous day.

== Championships and accomplishments ==
- Tokyo Sports
  - Wrestling Special Award (2016, 2017)
