= Ana Moceyawa =

New Zealand wrestler and judoka

Ana Moceyawa (born 2 November 1989) is a wrestler from New Zealand. In 2018 she is competing in the 2018 Commonwealth Games.

Moceyawa was born in Christchurch, and lives in Tauranga. Her father is Fijian, from the Yasawa islands. She is the 2016 and 2017 Oceania champion. In 2017 she won a bronze medal at the Commonwealth Championships in Wrestling under 57kg.

Moceyawa has also represented New Zealand in judo and from 2007 to 2011 she lived in Germany to focus on the sport.
