= Arkad Chubanov =

Kalmyk Buddhist lama (1840–1894)

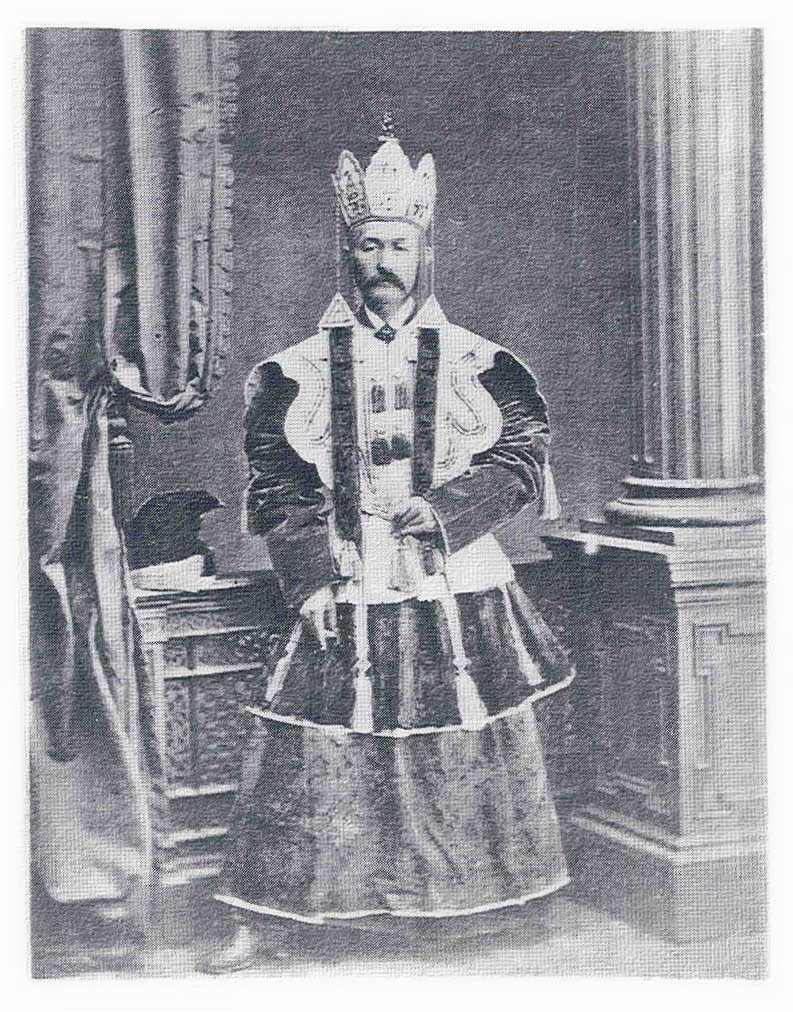

Lama of the Don Kalmyks
- In office 1873–1894
- Preceded by: Koti Badjuginov
- Succeeded by: Djimba Mikulinov

Personal life
- Born: 1840 Namrovskaia, Russian Empire
- Died: 1894 (aged 53–54)

Religious life
- Religion: Tibetan Buddhism

Senior posting
- Teacher: Djimba Gandjinov; Sandji Yavanov

Arkad Chubanov (Russian: Аркад Чубанов; 1840–1894) was a Kalmyk Buddhist lama who was born in the Iki-Burul aimak in the Salsk District of the Don Cossack Host sometime in 1840.

Lama Chubanov was born in 1840 in the Namrovskaia sotnia of the Ike Burul aimak. He was the second son of Chuban Manzhikov. His uncle, Roman Manzhikov, was the Baksha of the khurul in his native aimak. Following his uncle's path, Chubanov became a mandji (novice) at the age of nine, serving until the age of 13 in 1853. He then furthered his studies of Buddhism under the guidance of lama Djimba Gandjinov and then in the Bolshederbotovskii ulus under Sandji Yavanov, the Ochir Lama.

After he completed his studies in 1872, Chubanov returned home to become a monk in his native khurul. He remained in that position until 1873, when he was elected to replace Koti Badjuginov as "Lama of the Don Kalmyks" - the spiritual leader of the Kalmyk community in the Salsk District of the Don Cossack Host.

Upon becoming the Lama of the Don Kalmyks, Chubanov promoted education among Buzava (or Don Kalmyk) youth. In his native Namrovskaia sotnia, for example, Chubanov established a parish school, the first official school for Buzava youth in the Salsk District and perhaps the first school for Kalmyk boys in general. Chubanov also compiled and published the Kalmyk lunar calendar.

Chubanov died in 1894 after serving 21 years as Lama of the Don Kalmyks. He was succeeded by Djimba Mikulinov, the Baksha of the khurul in the Ike Burul aimak.

== See also ==
- Buddhism in Russia
- Buddhism in Kalmykia
- Dashi-Dorzho Itigilov
