= Pooja Dhanda =

Indian wrestler (born 1994)

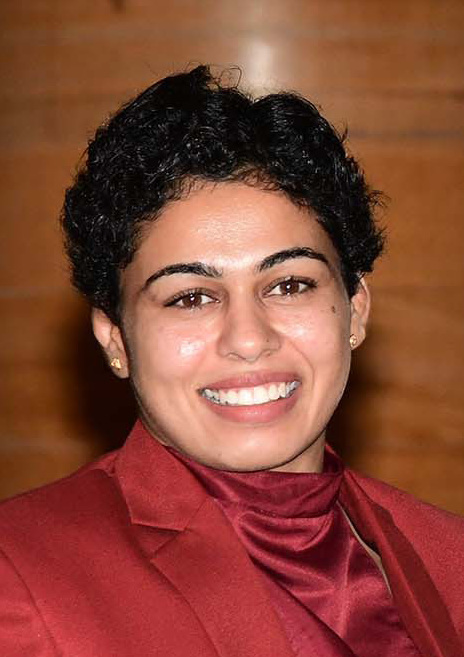

Personal information
- Nationality: Indian
- Born: 1 January 1994 (age 32) Budana village, Hisar district, Haryana, India
- Occupation: Wrestling Coach at Haryana Sports Department
- Height: 162 cm (5 ft 4 in)
- Weight: 57 kg (126 lb)

Sport
- Country: India
- Sport: Wrestling
- Event: Freestyle wrestling
- College team: government college of Hissar
- Coached by: Kuldeep Singh Bishnoi, Chander Soni
Medal record
Representing India
World Championships
Bronze medal – third place	2018 Budapest	57 kg
Women's Freestyle wrestling
2014 Asian Wrestling Championships
Bronze medal – third place	2014 Astana	58 kg
Asian Indoor and Martial Arts Championships
Bronze medal – third place	2017 Ashgabat	58 kg
Commonwealth Games
Silver medal – second place	2018 Gold Coast	57 kg
Youth Olympic Games
Silver medal – second place	2010 Singapore	60 kg
- Updated on 25 August 2018

Pooja Dhanda (born 1 January 1994) is an Indian wrestler from Budana village of Hisar district in Haryana, who won bronze medal at the 2018 World Championships at Budapest in 57 kg weight class. She won silver medals at 2010 Summer Youth Olympics and 2018 Commonwealth Games at Gold Coast in 60 kg and 57 kg category respectively. The grappler also won a Bronze at the 2014 Asian Wrestling Championship. Pooja has defeated Olympic and World Championship medalists. Government of India honoured her with the Arjuna award for outstanding performance in the field of Sports.

== Early life ==
Pooja was born in Budana village of Hisar district in Haryana. The daughter of a tractor driver with the Haryana Animal Husbandry Centre in Hisar, Dhanda started as a judo player at Mahabir Stadium but switched to wrestling in 2009. Pooja Dhanda is the daughter of Kamlesh Dhanda and father, Ajmer who was an athlete himself. She began her sporting journey with Judo in 2007. She was still below the minimum age required to participate in wrestling federation competitions, and hence started playing Judo. Pooja first secured a bronze medal at Asian Cadet Judo Championship at Hyderabad in 2007 and then won a Gold at the same event in its 2008 edition.

Despite the achievements, former India wrestler and coach Kripa Shankar Bishnoi advised her to make wrestling her career. Pooja began to train for wrestling under coach Subhash Chander Soni at Hisar in 2009.

In 2010 Pooja won Silver in wrestling at the Summer Youth Olympics in Singapore. Pooja won against famous grappler Babita Phogat in the final of the National Championship in 2013 and then won a bronze medal at the Asian Championship in 2014. But a ligament injury in 2015 almost ended her career.

The challenge was not only psychological but also of lack of financial resources. She had to undergo surgeries in Mumbai and follow a long process of rehabilitation. Government paid for her treatment, but rehabilitation costs, physiotherapist's fee and rent were significant. Employed with Haryana Sports Department as a wrestling coach, Pooja was on leave without pay.

== Career ==
After switching to wrestling in 2009, as a young sportswoman, Pooja's career took off on a promising note when she won the silver medal at the 2010 Summer Youth Olympics in the 60 kg category. After she debuted in the national championship in 2013, she participated in the World Wrestling Championship for the first time but was out of the event after a loss in the first round. she defeated Babita Phogat in the final, followed by a bronze medal in Asian Wrestling Championship at Astana in 2014. and has since won all four senior national championships by 2017. In the Pro Wrestling League season 3, she has defeated World and Olympic champion Helen Maroulis of the USA twice, World Championship silver medallist and Olympic bronze medallist Odunayo Adekuoroye of Nigeria and World Championship silver medallist Marwa Amri.

Pooja was screened and originally selected to play the role of Babita Phogat in blockbuster Dangal (2016), which she could not play due to an injury. However, Pooja later competed against and defeated senior Phogat sister Geeta Phogat in the real-life 2018 Commonwealth Games selection trials.

She won silver medal in the 2018 Commonwealth Games at Gold Coast in the women's 57 kg freestyle wrestling after losing to Nigeria's Odunayo Adekuoroye 7–5 in the final at the Carrara Sports Arena 1.
