= Linda Morais =

Canadian wrestler (born 1993)

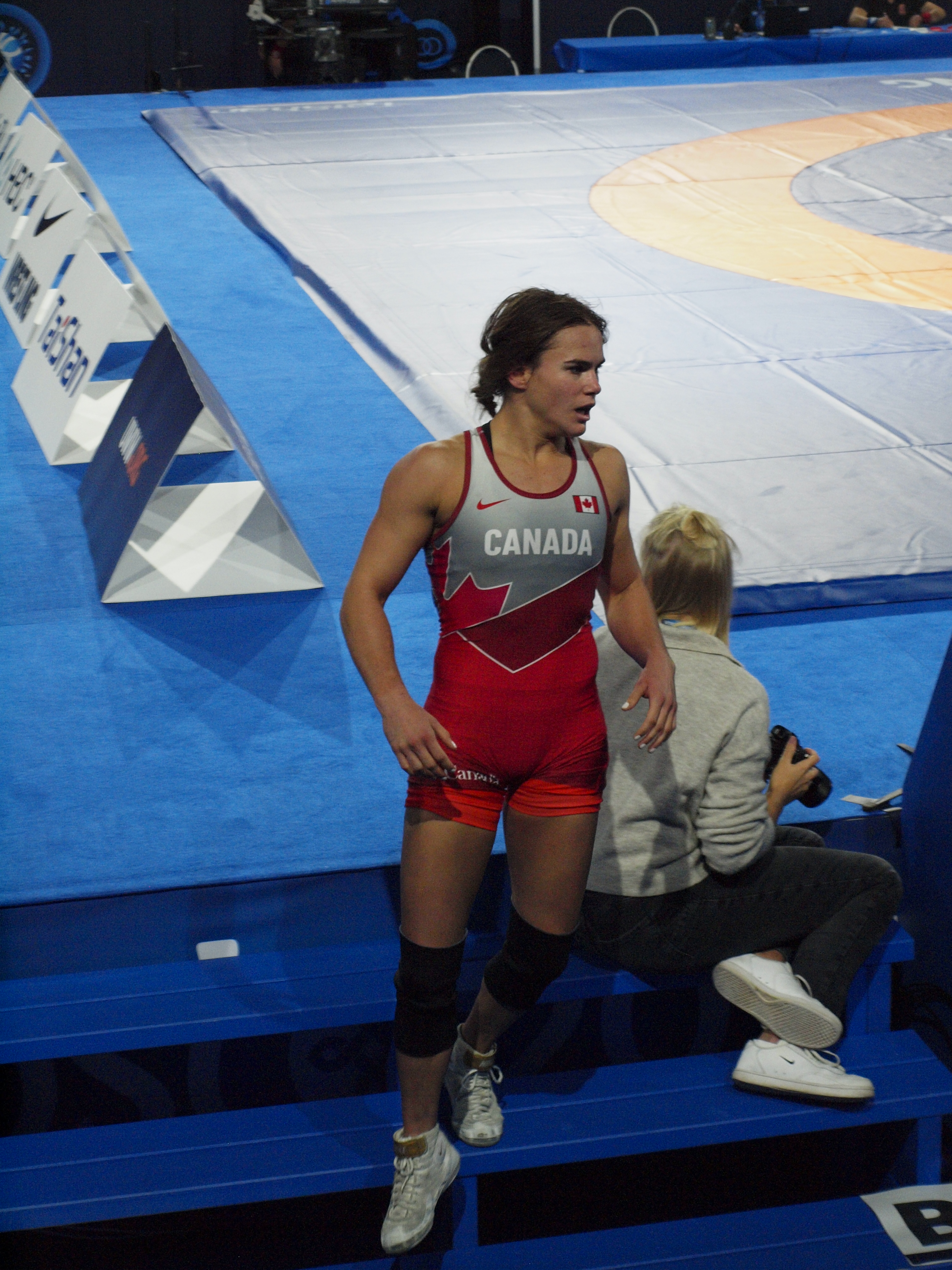
- Linda Morais at the 2021 World Wrestling Championships in Oslo, Norway

Personal information
- Born: 31 July 1993 (age 33) Tecumseh, Ontario, Canada
- Height: 167 cm (5 ft 6 in)
- Weight: 68 kg (150 lb)

Sport
- Sport: Wrestling
- Event: Freestyle
- Club: Montreal YMHA
- Coached by: David Zilberman
Medal record
Women's freestyle wrestling
Representing Canada
World Championships
Gold medal – first place	2019 Nur-Sultan	59 kg
Bronze medal – third place	2016 Budapest	60 kg
Bronze medal – third place	2022 Belgrade	68 kg
Commonwealth Games
Silver medal – second place	2022 Birmingham	68 kg
Commonwealth Wrestling Championship
Gold medal – first place	2016 Singapore	60 kg
Francophone Games
Silver medal – second place	2013 Nice	63 kg
Silver medal – second place	2017 Abidjan	63 kg

Linda Morais (born 31 July 1993) is a wrestler competing for Canada.

== Early life ==
Morais was born in Tecumseh, Ontario and grew up in Southwestern Ontario.

== Wrestling career ==
She won a gold medal in the 59 kg freestyle at the 2019 World Wrestling Championships and a bronze medal in the 60 kg freestyle at the 2016 World Wrestling Championships. She won one of the bronze medals in the 68 kg event at the 2022 World Wrestling Championships held in Belgrade, Serbia. She is also a two-time (2018 & 2016) World University Championship gold medallist.

Morais placed first in the 57 kg freestyle at the 2019 Canadian Wrestling Trials held in Niagara, Canada, earning a spot for the Canadian Olympic team at the Olympic qualifiers. However, she was unable to secure a spot in the top 2 in her weight-class at both the 2020 Pan-American Olympic Qualification Tournament and the 2021 World Olympic Qualification Tournament, failing to qualify for the 2020 Summer Olympics as a result.

Morais competed at the 2024 Pan American Wrestling Olympic Qualification Tournament held in Acapulco, Mexico hoping to qualify for the 2024 Summer Olympics in Paris, France. She was eliminated in her first match by Soleymi Caraballo of Venezuela. In May 2024, Morais qualified by earning the last quota spot available at the 2024 World Wrestling Olympic Qualification Tournament in Istanbul, Turkey. She defeated Alexandra Anghel of Romania in her Olympic wrestle-off match. She competed in the women's 68 kg event at the Olympics.

In December 2025, Morias announced her retirement.

== Coaching career ==
Morais has returned home to southwestern Ontario, where her career began. She has become a teacher and started coaching the sport at L’Essor High School.
