= 2019 World Wrestling Championships =

Competitive wrestling event held in Kazakhstan

- Host city: Nur-Sultan, Kazakhstan
- Dates: 14–22 September 2019
- Stadium: Barys Arena

Champions
- Freestyle: Russia
- Greco-Roman: Russia
- Women: Japan

The 2019 World Wrestling Championships were held in Nur-Sultan, Kazakhstan from 14 September to 22 September 2019.

The tournament served as qualification for the 2020 Summer Olympics, the top six wrestlers from each category earned their NOCs a qualification.

== Medal table ==
Rank	Nation	Gold	Silver	Bronze	Total
1	Russia	9	5	5	19
2	United States	5	0	2	7
3	Georgia	4	0	2	6
4	Japan	3	3	3	9
5	Azerbaijan	1	3	2	6
6	Turkey	1	2	1	4
6	Ukraine	1	2	1	4
8	Iran	1	1	5	7
9	Hungary	1	1	2	4
10	Cuba	1	1	0	2
11	Canada	1	0	0	1
11	Kyrgyzstan	1	0	0	1
11	North Korea	1	0	0	1
14	Kazakhstan	0	3	5	8
15	Sweden	0	2	1	3
16	China	0	1	6	7
17	India	0	1	4	5
18	Uzbekistan	0	1	2	3
19	Armenia	0	1	1	2
19	Bulgaria	0	1	1	2
21	Italy	0	1	0	1
21	Romania	0	1	0	1
23	Germany	0	0	4	4
24	Mongolia	0	0	3	3
25	Estonia	0	0	2	2
25	Serbia	0	0	2	2
27	Belarus	0	0	1	1
27	Nigeria	0	0	1	1
27	North Macedonia	0	0	1	1
27	Poland	0	0	1	1
27	Slovakia	0	0	1	1
27	Switzerland	0	0	1	1
Totals (32 entries)		30	30	60	120

== Team ranking ==
Rank	Men's freestyle		Men's Greco-Roman		Women's freestyle	
Rank	Team	Points	Team	Points	Team	Points
1	Russia	194	Russia	132	Japan	137
2	Kazakhstan	108	Uzbekistan	80	Russia	108
3	Iran	96	Georgia	79	United States	105
4	United States	94	Iran	75	China	102
5	Georgia	85	Kazakhstan	72	Ukraine	92
6	India	79	Japan	65	Kazakhstan	53
7	Azerbaijan	56	Hungary	64	Mongolia	51
8	Turkey	48	Cuba	57	Azerbaijan	48
9	Uzbekistan	34	Armenia	55	Germany	42
10	Japan	34	Germany	50	Sweden	41

== Medal summary ==
=== Men's freestyle ===
Event	Gold	Silver	Bronze
57 kg	Zaur Uguev; Russia	Süleyman Atlı; Turkey	Nurislam Sanayev; Kazakhstan
57 kg	Zaur Uguev; Russia	Süleyman Atlı; Turkey	Ravi Kumar Dahiya; India
61 kg	Beka Lomtadze; Georgia	Magomedrasul Idrisov; Russia	Behnam Ehsanpour; Iran
61 kg	Beka Lomtadze; Georgia	Magomedrasul Idrisov; Russia	Rahul Aware; India
65 kg	Gadzhimurad Rashidov; Russia	Daulet Niyazbekov; Kazakhstan	Bajrang Punia; India
65 kg	Gadzhimurad Rashidov; Russia	Daulet Niyazbekov; Kazakhstan	Iszmail Muszukajev; Hungary
70 kg	David Baev; Russia	Nurkozha Kaipanov; Kazakhstan	Magomedmurad Gadzhiev; Poland
70 kg	David Baev; Russia	Nurkozha Kaipanov; Kazakhstan	Younes Emami; Iran
74 kg	Zaurbek Sidakov; Russia	Frank Chamizo; Italy	Daniyar Kaisanov; Kazakhstan
74 kg	Zaurbek Sidakov; Russia	Frank Chamizo; Italy	Jordan Burroughs; United States
79 kg	Kyle Dake; United States	Jabrayil Hasanov; Azerbaijan	Gadzhi Nabiev; Russia
79 kg	Kyle Dake; United States	Jabrayil Hasanov; Azerbaijan	Tajmuraz Salkazanov; Slovakia
86 kg	Hassan Yazdani; Iran	Deepak Punia; India	Stefan Reichmuth; Switzerland
86 kg	Hassan Yazdani; Iran	Deepak Punia; India	Artur Naifonov; Russia
92 kg	J'den Cox; United States	Alireza Karimi; Iran	Irakli Mtsituri; Georgia
92 kg	J'den Cox; United States	Alireza Karimi; Iran	Alikhan Zhabrailov; Russia
97 kg	Abdulrashid Sadulaev; Russia	Sharif Sharifov; Azerbaijan	Kyle Snyder; United States
97 kg	Abdulrashid Sadulaev; Russia	Sharif Sharifov; Azerbaijan	Magomedgaji Nurov; North Macedonia
125 kg	Geno Petriashvili; Georgia	Taha Akgül; Turkey	Oleksandr Khotsianivskyi; Ukraine
125 kg	Geno Petriashvili; Georgia	Taha Akgül; Turkey	Deng Zhiwei; China

=== Men's Greco-Roman ===
Event	Gold	Silver	Bronze
55 kg	Nugzari Tsurtsumia; Georgia	Khorlan Zhakansha; Kazakhstan	Eldaniz Azizli; Azerbaijan
55 kg	Nugzari Tsurtsumia; Georgia	Khorlan Zhakansha; Kazakhstan	Shota Ogawa; Japan
60 kg	Kenichiro Fumita; Japan	Sergey Emelin; Russia	Meirambek Ainagulov; Kazakhstan
60 kg	Kenichiro Fumita; Japan	Sergey Emelin; Russia	Alireza Nejati; Iran
63 kg	Shinobu Ota; Japan	Stepan Maryanyan; Russia	Slavik Galstyan; Armenia
63 kg	Shinobu Ota; Japan	Stepan Maryanyan; Russia	Almat Kebispayev; Kazakhstan
67 kg	Ismael Borrero; Cuba	Artem Surkov; Russia	Frank Stäbler; Germany
67 kg	Ismael Borrero; Cuba	Artem Surkov; Russia	Mate Nemeš; Serbia
72 kg	Abuyazid Mantsigov; Russia	Aram Vardanyan; Uzbekistan	Aik Mnatsakanian; Bulgaria
72 kg	Abuyazid Mantsigov; Russia	Aram Vardanyan; Uzbekistan	Bálint Korpási; Hungary
77 kg	Tamás Lőrincz; Hungary	Alex Kessidis; Sweden	Mohammad Ali Geraei; Iran
77 kg	Tamás Lőrincz; Hungary	Alex Kessidis; Sweden	Jalgasbay Berdimuratov; Uzbekistan
82 kg	Lasha Gobadze; Georgia	Rafig Huseynov; Azerbaijan	Qian Haitao; China
82 kg	Lasha Gobadze; Georgia	Rafig Huseynov; Azerbaijan	Saeid Abdevali; Iran
87 kg	Zhan Beleniuk; Ukraine	Viktor Lőrincz; Hungary	Rustam Assakalov; Uzbekistan
87 kg	Zhan Beleniuk; Ukraine	Viktor Lőrincz; Hungary	Denis Kudla; Germany
97 kg	Musa Evloev; Russia	Artur Aleksanyan; Armenia	Mikheil Kajaia; Serbia
97 kg	Musa Evloev; Russia	Artur Aleksanyan; Armenia	Cenk İldem; Turkey
130 kg	Rıza Kayaalp; Turkey	Óscar Pino; Cuba	Heiki Nabi; Estonia
130 kg	Rıza Kayaalp; Turkey	Óscar Pino; Cuba	Iakobi Kajaia; Georgia

=== Women's freestyle ===
Event	Gold	Silver	Bronze
50 kg	Mariya Stadnik; Azerbaijan	Alina Vuc; Romania	Valentina Islamova; Kazakhstan
50 kg	Mariya Stadnik; Azerbaijan	Alina Vuc; Romania	Ekaterina Poleshchuk; Russia
53 kg	Pak Yong-mi; North Korea	Mayu Mukaida; Japan	Vinesh Phogat; India
53 kg	Pak Yong-mi; North Korea	Mayu Mukaida; Japan	Pang Qianyu; China
55 kg	Jacarra Winchester; United States	Nanami Irie; Japan	Olga Khoroshavtseva; Russia
55 kg	Jacarra Winchester; United States	Nanami Irie; Japan	Bat-Ochiryn Bolortuyaa; Mongolia
57 kg	Risako Kawai; Japan	Rong Ningning; China	Iryna Kurachkina; Belarus
57 kg	Risako Kawai; Japan	Rong Ningning; China	Odunayo Adekuoroye; Nigeria
59 kg	Linda Morais; Canada	Lyubov Ovcharova; Russia	Pei Xingru; China
59 kg	Linda Morais; Canada	Lyubov Ovcharova; Russia	Baatarjavyn Shoovdor; Mongolia
62 kg	Aisuluu Tynybekova; Kyrgyzstan	Taybe Yusein; Bulgaria	Henna Johansson; Sweden
62 kg	Aisuluu Tynybekova; Kyrgyzstan	Taybe Yusein; Bulgaria	Yukako Kawai; Japan
65 kg	Inna Trazhukova; Russia	Iryna Koliadenko; Ukraine	Wang Xiaoqian; China
65 kg	Inna Trazhukova; Russia	Iryna Koliadenko; Ukraine	Elis Manolova; Azerbaijan
68 kg	Tamyra Mensah-Stock; United States	Jenny Fransson; Sweden	Soronzonboldyn Battsetseg; Mongolia
68 kg	Tamyra Mensah-Stock; United States	Jenny Fransson; Sweden	Anna Schell; Germany
72 kg	Natalia Vorobieva; Russia	Alina Berezhna; Ukraine	Masako Furuichi; Japan
72 kg	Natalia Vorobieva; Russia	Alina Berezhna; Ukraine	Paliha; China
76 kg	Adeline Gray; United States	Hiroe Minagawa; Japan	Epp Mäe; Estonia
76 kg	Adeline Gray; United States	Hiroe Minagawa; Japan	Aline Rotter-Focken; Germany

== Participating nations ==
872 competitors from 95 nations participated.

- Albania (3)
- Algeria (7)
- American Samoa (1)
- Argentina (2)
- Armenia (15)
- Australia (3)
- Austria (8)
- Azerbaijan (28)
- Bahrain (2)
- Belarus (26)
- Brazil (6)
- Bulgaria (19)
- Burkina Faso (1)
- Cameroon (2)
- Canada (18)
- Chad (1)
- Chile (1)
- China (29)
- Chinese Taipei (7)
- Colombia (8)
- Costa Rica (1)
- Croatia (5)
- Cuba (12)
- Czech Republic (7)
- Denmark (3)
- Ecuador (3)
- Egypt (9)
- Estonia (5)
- Federated States of Micronesia (1)
- Finland (7)
- France (10)
- Georgia (20)
- Germany (23)
- Great Britain (2)
- Greece (5)
- Guam (4)
- Guinea (2)
- Guinea-Bissau (2)
- Honduras (2)
- Hungary (18)
- India (30)
- Iran (20)
- Israel (6)
- Italy (10)
- Jamaica (1)
- Japan (30)
- Kazakhstan (30)
- Kosovo (1)
- Kyrgyzstan (22)
- Latvia (2)
- Lebanon (1)
- Lithuania (11)
- Mexico (6)
- Moldova (19)
- Mongolia (21)
- Morocco (4)
- Nauru (1)
- Netherlands (2)
- New Zealand (4)
- Nigeria (6)
- North Korea (8)
- North Macedonia (4)
- Norway (6)
- Palau (3)
- Palestine (1)
- Panama (1)
- Peru (1)
- Philippines (1)
- Poland (21)
- Portugal (2)
- Puerto Rico (3)
- Qatar (2)
- Romania (14)
- Russia (30)
- San Marino (2)
- Serbia (6)
- Singapore (1)
- Slovakia (3)
- Slovenia (1)
- South Korea (30)
- Spain (6)
- Sweden (12)
- Switzerland (6)
- Syria (1)
- Tajikistan (7)
- Tunisia (2)
- Turkey (30)
- Turkmenistan (7)
- Uganda (1)
- Ukraine (30)
- United States (30)
- Uzbekistan (27)
- Venezuela (10)
- Vietnam (7)
- Yemen (1)
