= Wrestling at the 2014 Asian Games – Men's Greco-Roman 130 kg =

Men's Greco-Roman 130 kg at the 2014 Asian Games
- Venue: Dowon Gymnasium
- Date: 1 October 2014
- Competitors: 10 from 10 nations

Medalists
gold medal	Nurmakhan Tinaliyev	Kazakhstan
silver medal	Kim Yong-min	South Korea
bronze medal	Meng Qiang	China
bronze medal	Bashir Babajanzadeh	Iran

The men's Greco-Roman 130 kilograms wrestling competition at the 2014 Asian Games in Incheon was held on 1 October 2014 at the Dowon Gymnasium.

This wrestling competition consisted of a single-elimination tournament, with a repechage used to determine the winner of two bronze medals. The two finalists faced off for gold and silver medals. Each wrestler who lost to one of the two finalists moved into the repechage.

== Schedule ==
All times are Korea Standard Time (UTC+09:00)

Date	Time	Event
Wednesday, 1 October 2014	13:00	1/8 finals
Wednesday, 1 October 2014	13:00	Quarterfinals
Wednesday, 1 October 2014	13:00	Semifinals
Wednesday, 1 October 2014	13:00	Repechages
Wednesday, 1 October 2014	19:00	Finals

== Results ==
=== Main bracket ===
1/8 finals
Abror Mamasoliev (UZB)	2
Nurmakhan Tinaliyev (KAZ)	11
Dharmender Dalal (IND)	0
Bashir Babajanzadeh (IRI)	8

Quarterfinals
Kim Yong-min (KOR)	3
Hani Al-Marafi (JOR)	0
Meng Qiang (CHN)	8
Ali Nadhim (IRQ)	0
Murodjon Tuychiev (TJK)	0
Murat Ramonov (KGZ)	1
Nurmakhan Tinaliyev (KAZ)	1
Bashir Babajanzadeh (IRI)	0

Semifinals
Kim Yong-min (KOR)	3
Meng Qiang (CHN)	1
Murat Ramonov (KGZ)	1
Nurmakhan Tinaliyev (KAZ)	5

Gold medal
Kim Yong-min (KOR)	0
Nurmakhan Tinaliyev (KAZ)	5

=== Repechage ===
Repechage
Abror Mamasoliev (UZB)	0
Bashir Babajanzadeh (IRI)	5

Bronze medals
Hani Al-Marafi (JOR)	2
Meng Qiang (CHN)	7
Bashir Babajanzadeh (IRI)	4
Murat Ramonov (KGZ)	1

== Final standing ==
Rank	Athlete
1st place, gold medalist(s)	Nurmakhan Tinaliyev (KAZ)
2nd place, silver medalist(s)	Kim Yong-min (KOR)
3rd place, bronze medalist(s)	Meng Qiang (CHN)
3rd place, bronze medalist(s)	Bashir Babajanzadeh (IRI)
5	Hani Al-Marafi (JOR)
5	Murat Ramonov (KGZ)
7	Abror Mamasoliev (UZB)
8	Murodjon Tuychiev (TJK)
9	Ali Nadhim (IRQ)
9	Dharmender Dalal (IND)
