= Wrestling at the 2006 Asian Games – Men's Greco-Roman 120 kg =

Men's Greco-Roman 120 kg at the 2006 Asian Games
- Venue: Aspire Hall 4
- Date: 10 December 2006
- Competitors: 11 from 11 nations

Medalists
gold medal	Kim Gwang-seok	South Korea
silver medal	Mehdi Sharabiani	Iran
bronze medal	Nurbek Ibragimov	Kyrgyzstan
bronze medal	Liu Deli	China

The men's Greco-Roman 120 kilograms wrestling competition at the 2006 Asian Games in Doha was held on 10 December 2006 at the Aspire Hall 4.

This Greco-Roman wrestling competition consisted of a single-elimination tournament, with a repechage used to determine the winner of two bronze medals. The two finalists faced off for gold and silver medals. Each wrestler who lost to one of the two finalists moved into the repechage, culminating in a pair of bronze medal matches featuring the semifinal losers each facing the remaining repechage opponent from their half of the bracket.

Each bout consisted of up to three rounds, lasting two minutes apiece. The wrestler who scored more points in each round was the winner of that rounds; the bout finished when one wrestler had won two rounds (and thus the match).

== Schedule ==
All times are Arabia Standard Time (UTC+03:00)

Date	Time	Event
Sunday, 10 December 2006	09:00	Preliminary
Sunday, 10 December 2006	09:00	Quarterfinals
Sunday, 10 December 2006	09:00	Semifinals
Sunday, 10 December 2006	18:00	Finals

== Results ==
Legend

- F — Won by fall
- WO — Won by walkover

=== Main bracket ===
Preliminary
Dharmender Dalal (IND)	0	0
Murodjon Tuychiev (TJK)	7	3^{F}
Liu Deli (CHN)	4	3
Jasim Breesam (IRQ)	0	1
Bilal Ghorabi (LIB)	0	0
Gennadiy Lyashenko (KAZ)	3	7

Quarterfinals
Sami Al-Batneeji (PLE)	1	1
Mehdi Sharabiani (IRI)	2	4
Tserendashdorjiin Magaljav (MGL)	0	1
Nurbek Ibragimov (KGZ)	3	5
Kim Gwang-seok (KOR)	1	1	1
Murodjon Tuychiev (TJK)	1	1	1
Liu Deli (CHN)	1	3
Gennadiy Lyashenko (KAZ)	1	2

Semifinals
Mehdi Sharabiani (IRI)	2	2
Nurbek Ibragimov (KGZ)	0	0
Kim Gwang-seok (KOR)	1	2
Liu Deli (CHN)	1	0

Gold medal match
Mehdi Sharabiani (IRI)	1	1
Kim Gwang-seok (KOR)	1	1

=== Repechage ===
Bronze medal match
Sami Al-Batneeji (PLE)	0
Nurbek Ibragimov (KGZ)	5^{F}
Murodjon Tuychiev (TJK)
Liu Deli (CHN)	W	O

== Final standing ==
Rank	Athlete
1st place, gold medalist(s)	Kim Gwang-seok (KOR)
2nd place, silver medalist(s)	Mehdi Sharabiani (IRI)
3rd place, bronze medalist(s)	Nurbek Ibragimov (KGZ)
3rd place, bronze medalist(s)	Liu Deli (CHN)
5	Sami Al-Batneeji (PLE)
5	Murodjon Tuychiev (TJK)
7	Gennadiy Lyashenko (KAZ)
8	Jasim Breesam (IRQ)
9	Tserendashdorjiin Magaljav (MGL)
10	Dharmender Dalal (IND)
10	Bilal Ghorabi (LIB)
