= Wrestling at the 2010 Asian Games – Men's Greco-Roman 120 kg =

Men's Greco-Roman 120 kg at the 2010 Asian Games
- Venue: Huagong Gymnasium
- Date: 23 November 2010
- Competitors: 13 from 13 nations

Medalists
gold medal	Nurmakhan Tinaliyev	Kazakhstan
silver medal	Liu Deli	China
bronze medal	Murodjon Tuychiev	Tajikistan
bronze medal	Ali Nadhim	Iraq

The men's Greco-Roman 120 kilograms wrestling competition at the 2010 Asian Games in Guangzhou was held on 23 November 2010 at the Huagong Gymnasium.

This Greco-Roman wrestling competition consisted of a single-elimination tournament, with a repechage used to determine the winner of two bronze medals. The two finalists faced off for gold and silver medals. Each wrestler who lost to one of the two finalists moved into the repechage, culminating in a pair of bronze medal matches featuring the semifinal losers each facing the remaining repechage opponent from their half of the bracket.

Each bout consisted of up to three rounds, lasting two minutes apiece. The wrestler who scored more points in each round was the winner of that rounds; the bout finished when one wrestler had won two rounds (and thus the match).

== Schedule ==
All times are China Standard Time (UTC+08:00)

Date	Time	Event
Tuesday, 23 November 2010	09:30	1/8 finals
Tuesday, 23 November 2010	09:30	Quarterfinals
Tuesday, 23 November 2010	09:30	Semifinals
Tuesday, 23 November 2010	16:00	Repechages
Tuesday, 23 November 2010	17:00	Finals

== Results ==
Legend

- D — Disqualified
- F — Won by fall

=== Main bracket ===
1/8 finals
Hani Al-Marafi (JOR)	1	1
Soslan Farniev (UZB)	0	0
Ali Nadhim (IRQ)	2	1
Kim Gwang-seok (KOR)	0	0
Murat Ramonov (KGZ)	0	0
Amir Aliakbari (IRI)	1	2
Nurmakhan Tinaliyev (KAZ)	4^{F}
Chum Chivinn (CAM)	0
Hirokazu Shinjo (JPN)	0	1	0
Dharmender Dalal (IND)	1	0	1

Quarterfinals
Murodjon Tuychiev (TJK)	5^{F}
Hadi Aoun (LIB)	0
Liu Deli (CHN)	2	1
Hani Al-Marafi (JOR)	0	0
Ali Nadhim (IRQ)	0	0
Amir Aliakbari (IRI)	1	1
Nurmakhan Tinaliyev (KAZ)	7	1
Dharmender Dalal (IND)	0	0

Semifinals
Murodjon Tuychiev (TJK)	0	0
Liu Deli (CHN)	1	2
Amir Aliakbari (IRI)	0	1	0^{D}
Nurmakhan Tinaliyev (KAZ)	1	0	1

Final
Liu Deli (CHN)	0	0
Nurmakhan Tinaliyev (KAZ)	1	2

=== Repechage ===
Repechage round 1
Chum Chivinn (CAM)	0	0
Dharmender Dalal (IND)	3	1

Bronze medals
Hani Al-Marafi (JOR)	0	1	0
Murodjon Tuychiev (TJK)	1	0	1
Dharmender Dalal (IND)	0	0
Ali Nadhim (IRQ)	1	2

- Amir Aliakbari got disqualified due to infringement of the rules and was replaced by Ali Nadhim, who lost to Aliakbari in the previous round.

== Final standing ==
Rank	Athlete
1st place, gold medalist(s)	Nurmakhan Tinaliyev (KAZ)
2nd place, silver medalist(s)	Liu Deli (CHN)
3rd place, bronze medalist(s)	Murodjon Tuychiev (TJK)
3rd place, bronze medalist(s)	Ali Nadhim (IRQ)
5	Hani Al-Marafi (JOR)
5	Dharmender Dalal (IND)
7	Hirokazu Shinjo (JPN)
8	Soslan Farniev (UZB)
9	Murat Ramonov (KGZ)
9	Kim Gwang-seok (KOR)
11	Hadi Aoun (LIB)
12	Chum Chivinn (CAM)
—	Amir Aliakbari (IRI)
