= Yasmani Acosta =

Chilean wrestler (born 1988)

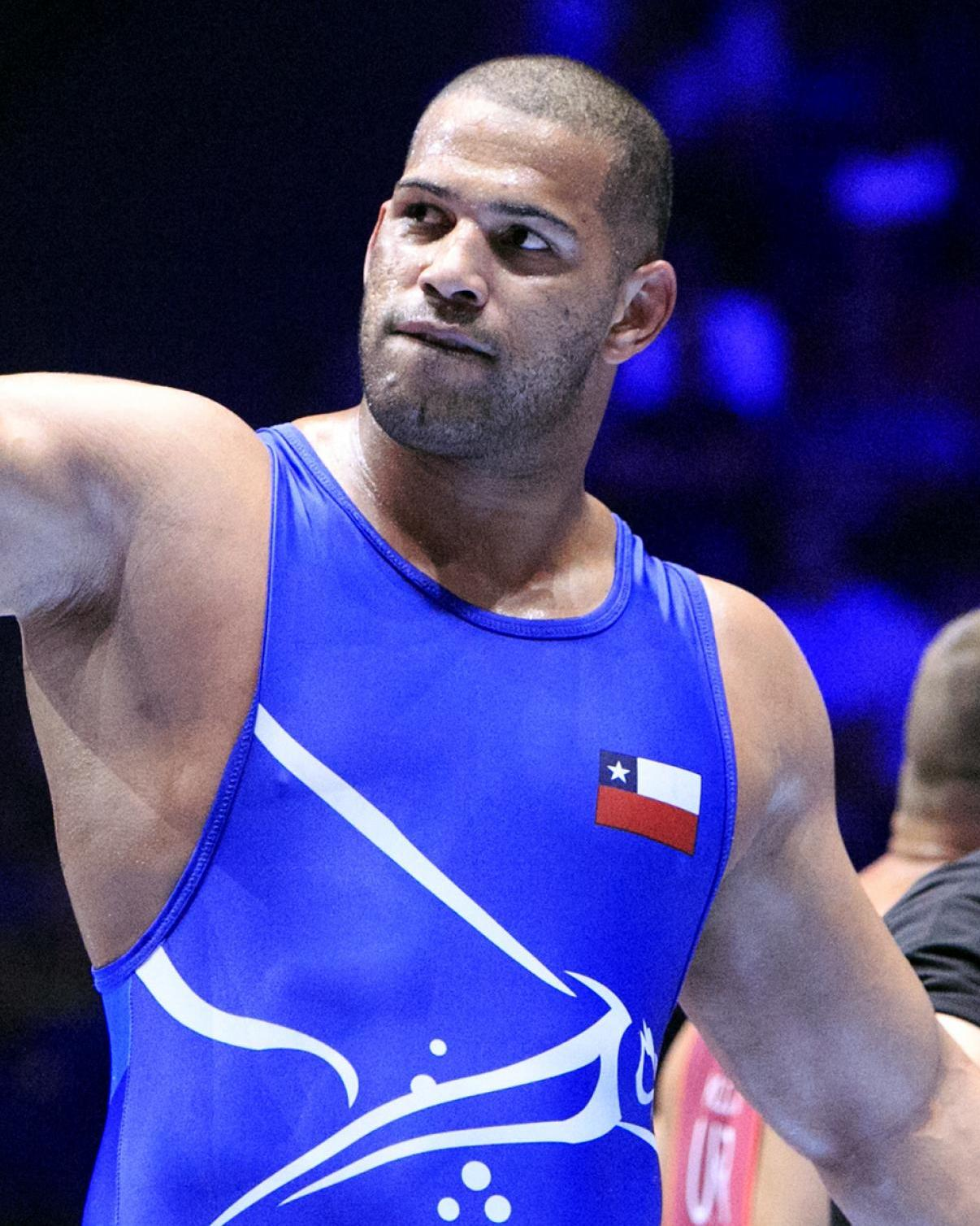
- Acosta at the 2017 World Wrestling Championships

Personal information
- Full name: Yasmani Acosta Fernández
- Citizenship: Chile (since 2018)
- Born: 16 July 1988 (age 38) Agramonte, Cuba
- Height: 1.93 m (6 ft 4 in)
- Weight: 130 kg (287 lb)

Sport
- Sport: Amateur wrestling
- Event: Greco-Roman
Medal record
Men's Greco-Roman wrestling
Representing Chile
Olympic Games
Silver medal – second place	2024 Paris	130 kg
World Championships
Bronze medal – third place	2017 Paris	130 kg
Pan American Games
Bronze medal – third place	2019 Lima	130 kg
Bronze medal – third place	2023 Santiago	130 kg
Pan American Championships
Gold medal – first place	2024 Acapulco	130 kg
Silver medal – second place	2017 Lauro de Freitas	130 kg
Bronze medal – third place	2018 Lima	130 kg
Bronze medal – third place	2022 Acapulco	130 kg
South American Games
Gold medal – first place	2018 Cochabamba	130 kg
Gold medal – first place	2022 Asunción	130 kg
Bolivarian Games
Gold medal – first place	2022 Valledupar	130 kg
Representing Cuba
Pan American Championships
Gold medal – first place	2011 Rionegro	120 kg
Bronze medal – third place	2015 Santiago	130 kg

Yasmani Acosta Fernández (Note: In this name that follows Hispanic American naming customs, the first or paternal surname is Acosta and the second or maternal family name is Fernández.) (born 16 July 1988) is a Chilean-Cuban Greco-Roman wrestler competing in the 130-kilogram weight class. He won a silver medal in the men's 130 kg event at the 2024 Summer Olympics in Paris, and a bronze medal at the 2017 World Championships. He has also won gold medals at the 2024 Pan American Wrestling Championships, the 2018 and 2022 South American Games, and the 2022 Bolivarian Games, as well as bronze medals at the 2019 and 2023 Pan American Games and a silver medal at the 2017 Pan American Wrestling Championships. He finished fifth at the 2020 Summer Olympics.

Born in Agramonte, Cuba, Acosta began his career representing Cuba, winning the 2011 Pan American Games title and a bronze medal at the 2015 edition held in Santiago, Chile, where he defected from the Cuban delegation and remained in the country. He was granted Chilean citizenship in 2018 and has competed internationally for Chile since 2017.

== Career ==
Acosta started wrestling in Cuba when he was 10 years old. While representing Cuba, he won multiple medals in South American competitions such as the Pan American Championships and the Cerro Pelado International. After competing at the 2015 Pan American Championships in Santiago, Chile, Acosta never returned to Cuba, stating that, since three–time Olympic Champion Mijaín López was always the wrestler who represented Cuba at the biggest tournaments in his weight class, he would have more opportunities if he represented Chile. However, Acosta was not able to represent Chile, as he did not have Cuba's permission. As a result, Acosta worked as a security guard for two years without training of any kind while trying to get permission. When he got consent in 2017, he started competing internationally again, residing in the Chilean Olympic Center.

He quickly saw results during his first year officially competing for Chile, earning a silver medal from the Pan American Championships and a bronze medal from the World Championships. In 2018, Acosta was granted Chilean citizenship. During the year, he went on to win a bronze medal at the Pan American Championships, a gold medal at the South American Games, and placed eighth at the World Championships. In 2019 he earned a bronze at the Pan American Championships and competed at multiple Grand Prix around Europe. In 2020, he won the Pan American Wrestling Olympic Qualification Tournament and earned a spot at the 2020 Summer Olympics. He competed in the men's 130 kg event.

He won one of the bronze medals in his event at the 2022 Pan American Wrestling Championships held in Acapulco, Mexico. He won the gold medal in his event at the 2022 Bolivarian Games held in Valledupar, Colombia. He competed in the 130 kg event at the 2022 World Wrestling Championships held in Belgrade, Serbia. He won the gold medal in his event at the 2022 South American Games held in Asunción, Paraguay.

He won the gold medal in his event at the 2024 Pan American Wrestling Championships held in Acapulco, Mexico. A few days later, at the Pan American Wrestling Olympic Qualification Tournament held in Acapulco, Mexico, he earned a quota place for Chile for the 2024 Summer Olympics held in Paris, France. At the 2024 Olympic Games, he won a silver medal in the 130 kg Greco-Roman final, where he faced Cuba's Mijaín López.

== Achievements ==
Year	Tournament	Location	Result	Event
2010	Wrestling World Cup	Yerevan, Armenia	5th	Greco-Roman 120 kg
2011	Wrestling World Cup	(Belarus) Minsk, Bielorussia	8th	Greco-Roman 120 kg
2011	Pan American Wrestling Championships	Rionegro, Colombia	1st	Greco-Roman 120 kg
2015	Pan American Wrestling Championships	Santiago, Chile	3rd	Greco-Roman 130 kg
2017	Pan American Wrestling Championships	Lauro de Freitas, Brazil	2nd	Greco-Roman 130 kg
2017	World Wrestling Championships	Paris, France	3rd	Greco-Roman 130 kg
2018	Pan American Wrestling Championships	(Peru) Lima, Perú	3rd	Greco-Roman 130 kg
2018	South American Games	Cochabamba, Bolivia	1st	Greco-Roman 130 kg
2018	World Wrestling Championships	Budapest, Hungary	8th	Greco-Roman 130 kg
2019	Pan American Games	(Peru) Lima, Perú	3rd	Greco-Roman 130 kg
2019	World Wrestling Championships	Nur-Sultan, Kazakhstan	12th	Greco-Roman 130 kg
2020	Pan American Wrestling Championships	Ottawa, Canada	8th	Greco-Roman 130 kg
2020	Pan American Wrestling Olympic Qualification	Ottawa, Canada	1st	Greco-Roman 130 kg
2020	Individual World Cup	Belgrade, Serbia	7th	Greco-Roman 130 kg
2021	Henri Deglane Challenge	Nice, France	1st	Greco-Roman 130 kg
2021	Matteo Pellicone Ranking Series	Rome, Italy	5th	Greco-Roman 130 kg
2022	Pan American Wrestling Championships	Acapulco, Mexico	3rd	Greco-Roman 130 kg
2022	Bolivarian Games	Valledupar, Colombia	1st	Greco-Roman 130 kg
2022	South American Games	Asunción, Paraguay	1st	Greco-Roman 130 kg
2024	Olympic Games	Paris, France	2nd	Greco-Roman 130 kg
