= Murat Ramonov =

Kyrgyzstani Greco-Roman wrestler

Personal information
- Nationality: Osset
- Born: July 21, 1990 (age 35) Bishkek, Kyrgyzstan
- Height: 1.86 m (6 ft 1 in)
- Weight: 115 kg (254 lb)

Sport
- Sport: Wrestling
- Event: Greco-Roman
Medal record
Representing Kyrgyzstan
Men's Greco-Roman wrestling
Asian Championships
Silver medal – second place	2016 Bangkok	130 kg
Bronze medal – third place	2021 Almaty	130 kg
Bronze medal – third place	2019 Xi'an	130 kg
Bronze medal – third place	2018 Bishkek	130 kg
Bronze medal – third place	2013 New Delhi	120 kg
Bronze medal – third place	2011 Tashkent	120 kg
Bronze medal – third place	2009 Pattaya	120 kg
- Updated on 23 April 2018

Murat Ramonov (born July 21, 1990) is a Kyrgyzstani Greco-Roman wrestler. He competed in the men's Greco-Roman 130 kg event at the 2016 Summer Olympics, in which he was eliminated in the round of 32 by Sergey Semenov.

== Major results ==
Year	Tournament	Venue	Result	Event
2009	Asian Championships	Pattaya, Thailand	3rd	Greco-Roman 120 kg
2010	World Championships	Moscow, Russia	15th	Greco-Roman 120 kg
2010	Asian Games	Guangzhou, China	9th	Greco-Roman 120 kg
2011	Asian Championships	Tashkent, Uzbekistan	3rd	Greco-Roman 120 kg
2011	World Championships	Istanbul, Turkey	21st	Greco-Roman 120 kg
2013	Asian Championships	New Delhi, India	3rd	Greco-Roman 120 kg
2013	Summer Universiade	Kazan, Russia	15th	Greco-Roman 120 kg
2014	Asian Games	Incheon, South Korea	5th	Greco-Roman 130 kg
2015	Asian Championships	Doha, Qatar	10th	Greco-Roman 130 kg
2015	World Championships	Las Vegas, United States	7th	Greco-Roman 130 kg
2016	Asian Championships	Bangkok, Thailand	2nd	Greco-Roman 130 kg
2016	Olympic Games	Rio de Janeiro, Brazil	11th	Greco-Roman 130 kg
2017	World Championships	Paris, France	16th	Greco-Roman 130 kg
2017	Asian Indoor and Martial Arts Games	Ashgabat, Turkmenistan	7th	Greco-Roman 130 kg
2018	Asian Championships	Bishkek, Kyrgyzstan	3rd	Greco-Roman 130 kg
2018	Asian Championships	Bishkek, Kyrgyzstan	7th	Freestyle 125 kg
2018	Asian Games	Jakarta, Indonesia	10th	Greco-Roman 130 kg
2019	Asian Championships	Xi'an, China	3rd	Greco-Roman 130 kg
2019	World Championships	Nur-Sultan, Kazakhstan	7th	Greco-Roman 130 kg
2021	Asian Championships	Almaty, Kazakhstan	3rd	Greco-Roman 130 kg
