= 2017 World Wrestling Championships – Men's Greco-Roman 130 kg =

Men's Greco-Roman 130 kg at the 2017 World Championships
- Venue: AccorHotels Arena
- Dates: 22 August 2017
- Competitors: 27 from 27 nations

Medalists
gold medal	Rıza Kayaalp	Turkey
silver medal	Heiki Nabi	Estonia
bronze medal	Óscar Pino	Cuba
bronze medal	Yasmani Acosta	Chile

The men's Greco-Roman 130 kilograms is a competition featured at the 2017 World Wrestling Championships, and was held in Paris, France on 22 August 2017.

This Greco-Roman wrestling competition consisted of a single-elimination tournament, with a repechage used to determine the winners of two bronze medals.

== Results ==
Legend

- F — Won by fall

=== Final ===
Final
Rıza Kayaalp (TUR)	2
Heiki Nabi (EST)	1

=== Top half ===
Round of 32
Miloslav Metodiev (BUL)	6
Tuomas Lahti (FIN)	4
Óscar Pino (CUB)	5
Bálint Lám (HUN)	1
Mu Jijie (CHN)	0
Alin Alexuc-Ciurariu (ROU)	4
Eduard Popp (GER)	2
Naveen Sevlia (IND)	1

Round of 16
Rıza Kayaalp (TUR)	2
Muminjon Abdullaev (UZB)	0
Nikolaos Leon (GRE)	1
Kiryl Hryshchanka (BLR)	2
Miloslav Metodiev (BUL)	0
Óscar Pino (CUB)	4
Alin Alexuc-Ciurariu (ROU)	1
Eduard Popp (GER)	3

Quarterfinals
Rıza Kayaalp (TUR)	3
Kiryl Hryshchanka (BLR)	1
Óscar Pino (CUB)	3
Eduard Popp (GER)	1

Semifinals
Rıza Kayaalp (TUR)	2
Óscar Pino (CUB)	1

=== Bottom half ===
Round of 32
Robby Smith (USA)	6^{F}
Tamás Soós (SVK)	0
Yasmani Acosta (CHI)	9^{F}
Kim Min-seok (KOR)	0
Vitaly Shchur (RUS)	1
Abdellatif Mohamed (EGY)	2
Levan Arabuli (GEO)	5
Arata Sonoda (JPN)	1
Murat Ramonov (KGZ)	1
Shahab Ghourehjili (IRI)	2
Matthieu Lorentz (FRA)	0
Heiki Nabi (EST)	5
Mykola Kuchmii (UKR)	2
Mantas Knystautas (LTU)	1

Round of 16
Robby Smith (USA)	1
Yasmani Acosta (CHI)	3
Abdellatif Mohamed (EGY)	3
Levan Arabuli (GEO)	11
Shahab Ghourehjili (IRI)	1
Heiki Nabi (EST)	4
Mykola Kuchmii (UKR)	2
Sabah Shariati (AZE)	1

Quarterfinals
Yasmani Acosta (CHI)	5^{F}
Levan Arabuli (GEO)	2
Heiki Nabi (EST)	4
Mykola Kuchmii (UKR)	1

Semifinals
Yasmani Acosta (CHI)	1
Heiki Nabi (EST)	2

=== Repechage ===
Repechage round 1
Matthieu Lorentz (FRA)	0
Shahab Ghourehjili (IRI)	5

Repechage round 2
Muminjon Abdullaev (UZB)	5
Kiryl Hryshchanka (BLR)	6
Shahab Ghourehjili (IRI)	0
Mykola Kuchmii (UKR)	2

Bronze medals
Kiryl Hryshchanka (BLR)	1
Óscar Pino (CUB)	3
Mykola Kuchmii (UKR)	0
Yasmani Acosta (CHI)	2
