= 2021 Pan American Wrestling Championships =

2021 Pan American Championship
- Host city: Guatemala City, Guatemala
- Dates: 27–30 May
- Stadium: Teodoro Palacios Flores Stadium

Champions
- Freestyle: United States
- Greco-Roman: United States
- Women: United States

The 2021 Pan American Wrestling Championships was held in Guatemala City, Guatemala, from 27 to 30 May 2021.

== Team ranking ==
Rank	Men's freestyle		Men's Greco-Roman		Women's freestyle	
Rank	Team	Points	Team	Points	Team	Points
1	United States	250	United States	205	United States	240
2	Canada	116	Brazil	95	Brazil	144
3	Mexico	114	Mexico	94	Canada	115
4	Dominican Republic	94	Guatemala	73	Ecuador	72
5	Guatemala	80	Colombia	72	Mexico	57
6	Brazil	73	Dominican Republic	60	Colombia	43
7	Colombia	56	Ecuador	53	Peru	38
8	Chile	47	Peru	42	Dominican Republic	35
9	Argentina	45	El Salvador	27	El Salvador	31
10	Peru	40	Honduras	25	Argentina	30

== Medal table ==
* Host nation (Guatemala)

Rank	Nation	Gold	Silver	Bronze	Total
1	United States (USA)	24	4	1	29
2	Dominican Republic (DOM)	1	4	4	9
3	Brazil (BRA)	1	3	12	16
4	Ecuador (ECU)	1	3	0	4
5	Colombia (COL)	1	1	0	2
6	Honduras (HON)	1	0	0	1
7	Canada (CAN)	0	6	3	9
8	Mexico (MEX)	0	4	6	10
9	Guatemala (GUA)*	0	1	5	6
10	Peru (PER)	0	1	2	3
11	Chile (CHI)	0	1	0	1
11	Panama (PAN)	0	1	0	1
13	Argentina (ARG)	0	0	3	3
14	Puerto Rico (PUR)	0	0	2	2
15	Costa Rica (CRC)	0	0	1	1
Totals (15 entries)		29	29	39	97

== Medal summary ==
=== Men's freestyle ===
Event	Gold	Silver	Bronze
57 kg	Vitali Arujau; United States	Roberto Alejandro; Mexico	Alexander Fernández; Dominican Republic
57 kg	Vitali Arujau; United States	Roberto Alejandro; Mexico	Samuel Alva; Peru
61 kg	Shelton Mack; United States	Juan Rubelín Ramírez; Dominican Republic	Jorge Olvera; Mexico
65 kg	Joseph McKenna; United States	Marcos Siqueira; Brazil	Jonnathan Pérez; Guatemala
65 kg	Joseph McKenna; United States	Marcos Siqueira; Brazil	Álbaro Rudesindo; Dominican Republic
70 kg	Alec Pantaleo; United States	Carlos Romero Millaqueo; Chile	Vincent De Marinis; Canada
70 kg	Alec Pantaleo; United States	Carlos Romero Millaqueo; Chile	Enrique Pérez; Guatemala
74 kg	Kyle Dake; United States	Víctor Hernández; Mexico	Jonathan Parrilla; Puerto Rico
74 kg	Kyle Dake; United States	Víctor Hernández; Mexico	Julio Rodríguez; Dominican Republic
79 kg	Thomas Gantt; United States	Néstor Tafur; Colombia	Sam Barmish; Canada
86 kg	David Taylor; United States	Clayton Pye; Canada	Noel Torres; Mexico
86 kg	David Taylor; United States	Clayton Pye; Canada	Thales Reis; Brazil
92 kg	Nathan Jackson; United States	Jérémy Poirier; Canada	Ángel Bautista; Mexico
97 kg	Kyle Snyder; United States	Luis Miguel Pérez; Dominican Republic	Maxwell Lacey; Costa Rica
125 kg	Gable Steveson; United States	Aly Barghout; Canada	Catriel Muriel; Argentina

=== Men's Greco-Roman ===
Event	Gold	Silver	Bronze
55 kg	no competitors		
60 kg	Dicther Toro; Colombia	Ildar Hafizov; United States	Maikol Josefa; Dominican Republic
60 kg	Dicther Toro; Colombia	Ildar Hafizov; United States	Marat Garipov; Brazil
63 kg	Andrés Montaño; Ecuador	Randon Miranda; United States	Emerson Felipe; Guatemala
67 kg	Xavier Johnson; United States	Enyer Feliciano; Dominican Republic	Diego Martínez; Mexico
67 kg	Xavier Johnson; United States	Enyer Feliciano; Dominican Republic	Calebe Ferreira; Brazil
72 kg	Jamel Johnson; United States	Juan Ruiz; Mexico	Carlos Fuentes; Guatemala
77 kg	Peyton Walsh; United States	Joílson Júnior; Brazil	Marciano Ali; Puerto Rico
77 kg	Peyton Walsh; United States	Joílson Júnior; Brazil	Reinier Jiménez; Guatemala
82 kg	Ben Provisor; United States	David Choc; Guatemala	Alexis Martínez; Mexico
87 kg	John Stefanowicz; United States	Daniel Vicente; Mexico	Ronisson Brandão; Brazil
97 kg	Kevin Mejía; Honduras	Braxton Amos; United States	Igor Queiroz; Brazil
130 kg	Leo Santana; Dominican Republic	Donald Longendyke; United States	Isaque Conserva; Brazil

=== Women's freestyle ===
Event	Gold	Silver	Bronze
50 kg	Sarah Hildebrandt; United States	Jacqueline Mollocana; Ecuador	Kamila Barbosa; Brazil
50 kg	Sarah Hildebrandt; United States	Jacqueline Mollocana; Ecuador	Patricia Bermúdez; Argentina
53 kg	Ronna Heaton; United States	Luisa Valverde; Ecuador	Sabrina Tapajós; Brazil
55 kg	Jacarra Winchester; United States	Virginie Kaze-Gascon; Canada	Anny Ramírez; Dominican Republic
57 kg	Giullia Penalber; Brazil	Alexandria Town; Canada	Cameron Guerin; United States
59 kg	Maya Nelson; United States	Linda Morais; Canada	Karoline Santana; Brazil
62 kg	Kayla Miracle; United States	Laís Nunes; Brazil	Alejandra Romero; Mexico
65 kg	Jennifer Rogers; United States	Ashley Zárate; Panama	Amanda Savard; Canada
68 kg	Tamyra Mensah-Stock; United States	Yessica Oviedo; Dominican Republic	Luz Vázquez; Argentina
68 kg	Tamyra Mensah-Stock; United States	Yessica Oviedo; Dominican Republic	Gabriela Rocha; Brazil
72 kg	Alexandria Glaude; United States	Yanet Sovero; Peru	Brenda Aguiar; Brazil
76 kg	Adeline Gray; United States	Génesis Reasco; Ecuador	Aline Ferreira; Brazil

== Participating nations ==
196 wrestlers from 19 nations competed.

- Argentina (8)
- Brazil (21)
- Canada (17)
- Chile (10)
- Colombia (19)
- Costa Rica (1)
- Dominican Republic (11)
- Ecuador (11)
- El Salvador (8)
- Guatemala (15)
- Honduras (2)
- Mexico (20)
- Nicaragua (1)
- Panama (4)
- Paraguay (2)
- Peru (11)
- Puerto Rico (4)
- United States (29)
- Venezuela (2)

== Results ==
Legend

- C — Won by 3 cautions given to the opponent
- DSQ — Disqualified
- F — Won by fall
- R — Retired
- WO — Won by walkover

=== Men's freestyle ===
==== Men's freestyle 57 kg ====
30 May

Round of 16
Edwin Segura (GUA)	0
Roberto Alejandro (MEX)	11

Quarterfinals
Diego Zuluaga (COL)	0
Alexander Fernández (DOM)	10
Bryan Oliveira (BRA)	0
Vito Arujau (USA)	10
Samuel Alva (PER)	5
Guesseppe Rea (ECU)	2
Yerson Henao (CHI)	1
Roberto Alejandro (MEX)	6

Semifinals
Alexander Fernández (DOM)	0
Vito Arujau (USA)	11
Samuel Alva (PER)	3
Roberto Alejandro (MEX)	5

Final
Vito Arujau (USA)	10
Roberto Alejandro (MEX)	0

Repechage round 1
Edwin Segura (GUA)	12
Yerson Henao (CHI)	2

Bronze medal match
Bryan Oliveira (BRA)	1
Alexander Fernández (DOM)	9
Edwin Segura (GUA)	3
Samuel Alva (PER)	5

==== Men's freestyle 61 kg ====
30 May

Pos	Athlete	Pld	W	L	CP	TP	DOM	GUA	PER
1	Juan Rubelín Ramírez (DOM)	2	2	0	8	20	—	10–0	10–0
2	Esteban Pérez (GUA)	2	1	1	3	10	0–4 SU	—	10–6
3	José Benites (PER)	2	0	2	1	6	0–4 SU	1–3 PO1	—

Source: UWW

Pos	Athlete	Pld	W	L	CP	TP	USA	MEX	ESA
1	Shelton Mack (USA)	2	2	0	8	22	—	12–2	10–0
2	Jorge Olvera (MEX)	2	1	1	4	12	1–4 SU1	—	10–8
3	Víctor López (ESA)	2	0	2	1	8	0–4 SU	1–3 PO1	—

Source: UWW

Semifinals
Juan Rubelín Ramírez (DOM)	10
Jorge Olvera (MEX)	0
Shelton Mack (USA)	10
Esteban Pérez (GUA)	0

Final
Juan Rubelín Ramírez (DOM)	0
Shelton Mack (USA)	2
Bronze medal
Jorge Olvera (MEX)	3
Esteban Pérez (GUA)	1

==== Men's freestyle 65 kg ====
30 May

Round of 16
~~Mauricio Sánchez (ECU)~~
Álbaro Rudesindo (DOM)	WO
Juan Antonio Rodríguez (ESA)	0
Joseph McKenna (USA)	10
Sebastian Rivera (PUR)	10
Alexis Olvera (MEX)	0
Dillon Williams (CAN)	2
Agustín Destribats (ARG)	4

Quarterfinals
Marcos Siqueira (BRA)	7
David Pinilla (PAN)	3
Jonnathan Pérez (GUA)	10^{F}
José González (COL)	2
Álbaro Rudesindo (DOM)	6
Joseph McKenna (USA)	17
Sebastian Rivera (PUR)	6
Agustín Destribats (ARG)	1

Semifinals
Marcos Siqueira (BRA)	12
Jonnathan Pérez (GUA)	1
Joseph McKenna (USA)	10
Sebastian Rivera (PUR)	0

Final
Marcos Siqueira (BRA)	0
Joseph McKenna (USA)	10

Repechage round 1
Juan Antonio Rodríguez (ESA)	0
Álbaro Rudesindo (DOM)	10

Bronze medal match
David Pinilla (PAN)	1
Jonnathan Pérez (GUA)	3
Álbaro Rudesindo (DOM)	10
Sebastian Rivera (PUR)	0

==== Men's freestyle 70 kg ====
30 May

Quarterfinals		Semifinals		Final
Alec Pantaleo (USA)	10
João Victor Santos (BRA)	0	Alec Pantaleo (USA)	11
Sixto Auccapiña (PER)	5	Vincent De Marinis (CAN)	0
Vincent De Marinis (CAN)	7			Alec Pantaleo (USA)	12
Enrique Pérez (GUA)	4			Carlos Romero (CHI)	0
Iván González (MEX)	3	Enrique Pérez (GUA)	9
Sebastián Sosa (PAR)	0	Carlos Romero (CHI)	15
Carlos Romero (CHI)	10

Bronze medals
João Victor Santos (BRA)	0
Vincent De Marinis (CAN)	4^{F}
Sebastián Sosa (PAR)	0
Enrique Pérez (GUA)	12

==== Men's freestyle 74 kg ====
30 May

Round of 16
Jasmit Phulka (CAN)	10
Pablo Vera (PAR)	0
~~Eliezer Baltodano (NCA)~~
Antony Iparraguirre (PER)	WO
Hossman Carvajal (COL)	0
Renato da Silva (BRA)	10
Julio Rodríguez (DOM)	0
Kyle Dake (USA)	10

Quarterfinals
Victor Hernández (MEX)	9
Jonathan Parrilla (PUR)	0
León Peralta (CHI)	11
Malhcon Pineda (GUA)	0
Jasmit Phulka (CAN)	10
Antony Iparraguirre (PER)	0
Renato da Silva (BRA)	0
Kyle Dake (USA)	10

Semifinals
Victor Hernández (MEX)	7
León Peralta (CHI)	3
Jasmit Phulka (CAN)	0
Kyle Dake (USA)	10

Final
Victor Hernández (MEX)	0
Kyle Dake (USA)	10

Repechage round 1
Julio Rodríguez (DOM)	10
Renato da Silva (BRA)	0

Bronze medal match
Jonathan Parrilla (PUR)	4
León Peralta (CHI)	4
Julio Rodríguez (DOM)	4
Jasmit Phulka (CAN)	0

==== Men's freestyle 79 kg ====
29 May

Pos	Athlete	Pld	W	L	CP	TP	COL	ARG	MEX
1	Néstor Tafur (COL)	2	2	0	8	10	—	4–0	6–0 Fall
2	Jorge Llano (ARG)	2	1	1	3	7	0–3 PO	—	7–0
3	Javier Salazar (MEX)	2	0	2	0	0	0–5 FA	0–3 PO	—

Source: UWW

Pos	Athlete	Pld	W	L	CP	TP	USA	CAN	GUA
1	Thomas Gantt (USA)	2	2	0	8	21	—	11–1	10–0
2	Sam Barmish (CAN)	2	1	1	4	12	1–4 SU1	—	11–6
3	David Choc (GUA)	2	0	2	1	6	0–4 SU	1–3 PO1	—

Source: UWW

Semifinals
Néstor Tafur (COL)	10
Sam Barmish (CAN)	0
Thomas Gantt (USA)	10
Jorge Llano (ARG)	0

Final
Néstor Tafur (COL)	0
Thomas Gantt (USA)	8
Bronze medal
Sam Barmish (CAN)	6
Jorge Llano (ARG)	0

==== Men's freestyle 86 kg ====
30 May

Quarterfinals		Semifinals		Final
David Taylor (USA)	10
Noel Torres (MEX)	0	David Taylor (USA)	10
Jorge Andy (ECU)	10	Juan Sebastián Rivera (COL)	0
Juan Sebastián Rivera (COL)	3^{F}			David Taylor (USA)	10
Emanuel Chamorro (ARG)	0			Clayton Pye (CAN)	0
Clayton Pye (CAN)	4^{F}	Clayton Pye (CAN)	10
Thales Reis (BRA)	12	Thales Reis (BRA)	0
Sergio Mendoza (GUA)	2

Bronze medals
Noel Torres (MEX)	10
Juan Sebastián Rivera (COL)	0
Emanuel Chamorro (ARG)	0
Thales Reis (BRA)	8^{F}

==== Men's freestyle 92 kg ====
29 May

Pos	Athlete	Pld	W	L	CP	TP	USA	CAN	MEX	VEN	PAN
1	Nathan Jackson (USA)	4	4	0	18	20	—	10–0	10–0	WO	WO
2	Jérémy Poirier (CAN)	4	3	1	14	10	0–4 SU	—	10–0	WO	WO
3	Ángel Bautista (MEX)	4	2	2	10	4	0–4 SU	0–4 SU	—	4–0 Fall	WO
—	Gilberto Ayala (VEN)	4	0	4	0	0	0–5 FO	0–5 IN	0–5 FA	—	
—	Eric Ramos (PAN)	4	0	4	0	0	0–5 FO	0–5 FO	0–5 FO	0–0 2FO	—

Source: UWW

==== Men's freestyle 97 kg ====
30 May

Pos	Athlete	Pld	W	L	CP	TP	USA	CRC	CAN	COL
1	Kyle Snyder (USA)	3	3	0	12	32	—	10–0	10–0	12–0
2	Maxwell Lacey (CRC)	3	2	1	8	24	0–4 SU	—	14–3	10–0
3	Richard DesChatelets (CAN)	3	1	2	5	13	0–4 SU	1–4 SU1	—	10–0
4	Kenett Martínez (COL)	3	0	3	0	0	0–4 SU	0–4 SU	0–4 SU	—

Source: UWW

Pos	Athlete	Pld	W	L	CP	TP	DOM	BRA	CHI
1	Luis Miguel Pérez (DOM)	2	2	0	8	21	—	10–0	11–0
2	Marcos Carrozzino (BRA)	2	1	1	3	9	0–4 SU	—	9–0
3	Matías Uribe (CHI)	2	0	2	0	0	0–4 SU	0–3 PO	—

Source: UWW

Semifinals
Kyle Snyder (USA)	10
Marcos Carrozzino (BRA)	0
Luis Miguel Pérez (DOM)	11
Maxwell Lacey (CRC)	0

Final
Kyle Snyder (USA)	11
Luis Miguel Pérez (DOM)	0
Bronze medal
Marcos Carrozzino (BRA)	6
Maxwell Lacey (CRC)	12^{F}

==== Men's freestyle 125 kg ====
30 May

Pos	Athlete	Pld	W	L	CP	TP	USA	CAN	GUA	COL
1	Gable Steveson (USA)	3	3	0	12	32	—	10–0	10–0	10–0
2	Aly Barghout (CAN)	3	2	1	8	24	0–4 SU	—	12–0	10–0
3	Christian Chajón (GUA)	3	1	2	5	13	0–4 SU	0–4 SU	—	4–0 Fall
4	Santiago Restrepo (COL)	3	0	3	0	0	0–4 SU	0–4 SU	0–5 FA	—

Source: UWW

Pos	Athlete	Pld	W	L	CP	TP	ARG	MEX	DOM
1	Catriel Muriel (ARG)	2	2	0	8	21	—	8–0	4–0 Fall
2	Eduardo García (MEX)	2	1	1	3	9	0–3 PO	—	6–3
3	Elison Adames (DOM)	2	0	2	0	0	0–5 FA	1–3 PO1	—

Source: UWW

Semifinals
Gable Steveson (USA)	10
Eduardo García (MEX)	0
Catriel Muriel (ARG)	0
Aly Barghout (CAN)	4^{F}

Final
Gable Steveson (USA)	10
Aly Barghout (CAN)	0
Bronze medal
Eduardo García (MEX)	1
Catriel Muriel (ARG)	5

=== Men's Greco-Roman ===
==== Men's Greco-Roman 60 kg ====
27 May

Quarterfinals		Semifinals		Final
Dicther Toro (COL)	8
Víctor López (ESA)	0	Dicther Toro (COL)	9
Maikol Josefa (DOM)	9	Maikol Josefa (DOM)	1
Pedro Gutiérrez (CHI)	0			Dicther Toro (COL)	7
Ildar Hafizov (USA)	9			Ildar Hafizov (USA)	3
Joshua Medina (PUR)	0	Ildar Hafizov (USA)	10
Jeremy Peralta (ECU)	0	Marat Garipov (BRA)	1
Marat Garipov (BRA)	8

Bronze medals
Víctor López (ESA)	0
Maikol Josefa (DOM)	9
Joshua Medina (PUR)	0
Marat Garipov (BRA)	9

==== Men's Greco-Roman 63 kg ====
27 May

Pos	Athlete	Pld	W	L	CP	TP	ECU	USA	COL	ESA
1	Andrés Montaño (ECU)	3	3	0	12	23	—	5–0	8–0 Fall	10–0
2	Randon Miranda (USA)	3	2	1	8	18	0–3 PO	—	8–0	10–0
3	Víctor Mena (COL)	3	1	2	4	12	0–5 FA	0–4 SU	—	12–4
4	Juan Antonio Rodríguez (ESA)	3	0	3	1	4	0–4 SU	0–4 SU	1–4 SU1	—

Source: UWW

Pos	Athlete	Pld	W	L	CP	TP	GUA	PER	ARG
1	Emerson Felipe (GUA)	2	2	0	8	23	—	14–6	9–0
2	Joao Benavides (PER)	2	1	1	6	15	1–4 SU1	—	9–1 Fall
3	Atila Repetto (ARG)	2	0	2	0	1	0–4 SU	0–5 FA	—

Source: UWW

Semifinals
Andrés Montaño (ECU)	8
Joao Benavides (PER)	0
Emerson Felipe (GUA)	2
Randon Miranda (USA)	11

Final
Andrés Montaño (ECU)	7
Randon Miranda (USA)	8
Bronze medal
Joao Benavides (PER)	4
Emerson Felipe (GUA)	5

==== Men's Greco-Roman 67 kg ====
27 May

Round of 16
Xavier Johnson (USA)	9
Daniel Coles (CAN)	0

Quarterfinals
Alejandro Varela (GUA)	3
Juan Palma (COL)	5
Diego Martínez (MEX)	2
Enyer Feliciano (DOM)	3
Cristóbal Torres (CHI)	1
Calebe Ferreira (BRA)	9
Nilton Soto (PER)	3
Xavier Johnson (USA)	7

Semifinals
Juan Palma (COL)	2
Enyer Feliciano (DOM)	5
Calebe Ferreira (BRA)	0
Xavier Johnson (USA)	11

Final
Enyer Feliciano (DOM)	0
Xavier Johnson (USA)	11

Repechage round 1
Daniel Coles (CAN)	2
Nilton Soto (PER)	4

Bronze medal match
Diego Martínez (MEX)	9
Juan Palma (COL)	0
Nilton Soto (PER)	1
Calebe Ferreira (BRA)	6

==== Men's Greco-Roman 72 kg ====
27 May

Pos	Athlete	Pld	W	L	CP	TP	USA	MEX	GUA	PER
1	Jamel Johnson (USA)	3	3	0	10	24	—	9–0	7–3	8–5
2	Juan Ruiz (MEX)	3	2	1	6	16	0–4 SU	—	7–3	9–8
3	Carlos Fuentes (GUA)	3	1	2	6	17	1–3 PO1	1–3 PO1	—	11–2
4	Gerardo Oliva (PER)	3	0	3	3	15	1–3 PO1	1–3 PO1	1–4 SU1	—

Source: UWW

==== Men's Greco-Roman 77 kg ====
28 May

Quarterfinals		Semifinals		Final
Peyton Walsh (USA)	11
Marciano Ali (PUR)	0	Peyton Walsh (USA)	8
Enrique Cuero (ECU)	8	Enrique Cuero (ECU)	0
Ryan Cubas (PER)	0			Peyton Walsh (USA)	5
Reinier Jiménez (GUA)	10			Joílson Júnior (BRA)	5
Brandon Calle (COL)	0	Reinier Jiménez (GUA)	1
Joílson Júnior (BRA)	8	Joílson Júnior (BRA)	10
Matías Cabezas (CHI)	0

Bronze medals
Marciano Ali (PUR)	13^{F}
Enrique Cuero (ECU)	2
Matías Cabezas (CHI)	0
Reinier Jiménez (GUA)	8

==== Men's Greco-Roman 82 kg ====
28 May

Pos	Athlete	Pld	W	L	CP	TP	USA	GUA	MEX
1	Ben Provisor (USA)	2	2	0	8	17	—	9–0	8–0
2	David Choc (GUA)	2	1	1	4	11	0–4 SU	—	11–3
3	Alexis Martínez (MEX)	2	0	2	1	3	0–4 SU	1–4 SU1	—

Source: UWW

==== Men's Greco-Roman 87 kg ====
28 May

Pos	Athlete	Pld	W	L	CP	TP	HON	USA	COL
1	Ariel Alfonso (HON)	2	2	0	7	12	—	4–3	8–0
2	John Stefanowicz (USA)	2	1	1	5	11	1–3 PO1	—	8–0
3	José Mosquera (COL)	2	0	2	0	0	0–4 SU	0–4 SU	—

Source: UWW

Pos	Athlete	Pld	W	L	CP	TP	BRA	MEX	PAN
1	Ronisson Brandão (BRA)	2	2	0	7	12	—	3–2	9–0
2	Daniel Vicente (MEX)	2	1	1	5	11	1–3 PO1	—	9–0
3	Eric Ramos (PAN)	2	0	2	0	0	0–4 SU	0–4 SU	—

Source: UWW

Semifinals
Ariel Alfonso (HON)	5
Daniel Vicente (MEX)	3
Ronisson Brandão (BRA)	0
John Stefanowicz (USA)	6

Final
~~Ariel Alfonso (HON)~~	1^{DSQ}
John Stefanowicz (USA)	2
Bronze medal
Daniel Vicente (MEX)	1
Ronisson Brandão (BRA)	1

==== Men's Greco-Roman 97 kg ====
27 May

Pos	Athlete	Pld	W	L	CP	TP	HON	USA	COL	ESA
1	Kevin Mejía (HON)	3	3	0	13	21	—	9–0	8–0	4–0 Fall
2	Braxton Amos (USA)	3	2	1	8	19	0–4 SU	—	11–0	8–0
3	Santiago Echeverry (COL)	3	1	2	4	9	0–4 SU	0–4 SU	—	9–0
4	Rafael Escamilla (ESA)	3	0	3	0	0	0–5 FA	0–4 SU	0–4 SU	—

Source: UWW

Pos	Athlete	Pld	W	L	CP	TP	BRA	MEX	VEN
1	Igor Queiroz (BRA)	2	2	0	7	25	—	5–1	9–0
2	Ricardo Mancilla (MEX)	2	1	1	6	5	1–3 PO1	—	4–0 Fall
3	Gilberto Ayala (VEN)	2	0	2	0	0	0–4 SU	0–5 FA	—

Source: UWW

Semifinals
Kevin Mejía (HON)	4^{F}
Ricardo Mancilla (MEX)	0
Igor Queiroz (BRA)	0
Braxton Amos (USA)	3

Final
Kevin Mejía (HON)	9
Braxton Amos (USA)	0
Bronze medal
Ricardo Mancilla (MEX)	3
Igor Queiroz (BRA)	7

==== Men's Greco-Roman 130 kg ====
27 May

Pos	Athlete	Pld	W	L	CP	TP	USA	MEX	ARG
1	Donald Longendyke (USA)	2	2	0	6	13	—	5–2	8–4
2	Luis Alberto Román (MEX)	2	1	1	4	7	1–3 PO1	—	5–0
3	Catriel Muriel (ARG)	2	0	2	1	4	1–3 PO1	0–3 PO	—

Source: UWW

Pos	Athlete	Pld	W	L	CP	TP	DOM	BRA	COL
1	Leo Santana (DOM)	2	2	0	8	11	—	7–2	4–0 Fall
2	Isaque Conserva (BRA)	2	1	1	6	6	1–3 PO1	—	4–0 Fall
3	Steven Riaño (COL)	2	0	2	0	0	0–5 FA	0–5 FA	—

Source: UWW

Semifinals
Donald Longendyke (USA)	6
Isaque Conserva (BRA)	1
Leo Santana (DOM)	3
Luis Alberto Román (MEX)	1

Final
Donald Longendyke (USA)	0
Leo Santana (DOM)	3
Bronze medal
Isaque Conserva (BRA)	3^{F}
Luis Alberto Román (MEX)	1

=== Women's freestyle ===
==== Women's freestyle 50 kg ====
29 May

Quarterfinals		Semifinals		Final
Yusmy Chaparro (COL)	2
Jacqueline Mollocana (ECU)	12	Jacqueline Mollocana (ECU)	3^{F}
Kamila Barbosa (BRA)	8	Kamila Barbosa (BRA)	0
Daniela Hernández (MEX)	3			Jacqueline Mollocana (ECU)	0
Madison Parks (CAN)	4			Sarah Hildebrandt (USA)	10
Thalía Mallqui (PER)	0	Madison Parks (CAN)	0
Patricia Bermúdez (ARG)	0	Sarah Hildebrandt (USA)	10
Sarah Hildebrandt (USA)	10

Bronze medals
Yusmy Chaparro (COL)	0
Kamila Barbosa (BRA)	3
Patricia Bermúdez (ARG)	5
Madison Parks (CAN)	2

==== Women's freestyle 53 kg ====
29 May

Pos	Athlete	Pld	W	L	CP	TP	ECU	USA	CAN	COL
1	Luisa Valverde (ECU)	3	3	0	14	22	—	10–0	8–0 Fall	4–0 Fall
2	Ronna Heaton (USA)	3	2	1	9	16	0–4 SU	—	6–4 Fall	10–0
3	Jayd Davis (CAN)	3	1	2	4	14	0–5 FA	0–5 FA	—	10–0
4	Yineth Romero (COL)	3	0	3	0	0	0–5 FA	0–4 SU	0–4 SU	—

Source: UWW

Pos	Athlete	Pld	W	L	CP	TP	MEX	BRA	ESA
1	Laura Peredo (MEX)	2	2	0	7	18	—	8–1	10–0
2	Sabrina Tapajós (BRA)	2	1	1	5	12	1–3 PO1	—	11–0
3	Karla Hernández (ESA)	2	0	2	0	0	0–4 SU	0–4 SU	—

Source: UWW

Semifinals
Luisa Valverde (ECU)	6^{F}
Sabrina Tapajós (BRA)	0
Laura Peredo (MEX)	0
Ronna Heaton (USA)	10

Final
Luisa Valverde (ECU)	6
Ronna Heaton (USA)	9
Bronze medal
Sabrina Tapajós (BRA)	2
Laura Peredo (MEX)	2

==== Women's freestyle 55 kg ====
28 May

Pos	Athlete	Pld	W	L	CP	TP	USA	CAN	DOM	GUA	CHI
1	Jacarra Winchester (USA)	4	4	0	17	35	—	5–0 Fall	10–0	10–0	10–0
2	Virginie Kaze-Gascon (CAN)	4	3	1	12	30	0–5 FA	—	10–0	10–0	10–0
3	Anny Ramírez (DOM)	4	2	2	8	21	0–4 SU	0–4 SU	—	10–0	11–0
4	Neidy Vásquez (GUA)	4	1	3	3	12	0–4 SU	0–4 SU	0–4 SU	—	12–9
5	Dafne Palacios (CHI)	4	0	4	1	9	0–4 SU	0–4 SU	0–4 SU	1–3 PO1	—

Source: UWW

==== Women's freestyle 57 kg ====
29 May

Pos	Athlete	Pld	W	L	CP	TP	BRA	CAN	ESA	CHI
1	Giullia Penalber (BRA)	3	3	0	14	16	—	4–4 Fall	10–0	2–0 Fall
2	Alexandria Town (CAN)	3	2	1	8	24	0–5 FA	—	10–0	10–0
3	Carolina Ochoa (ESA)	3	1	2	3	5	0–4 SU	0–4 SU	—	5–1
4	Javiera Roco (CHI)	3	0	3	1	1	0–5 FA	0–4 SU	1–3 PO1	—

Source: UWW

Pos	Athlete	Pld	W	L	CP	TP	USA	MEX	COL
1	Cameron Guerin (USA)	2	2	0	8	14	—	8–6	6–1 Fall
2	Alma Valencia (MEX)	2	1	1	6	16	1–3 PO1	—	10–0 Fall
3	Leydi Almeida (COL)	2	0	2	0	1	0–5 FA	0–5 FA	—

Source: UWW

Semifinals
Giullia Penalber (BRA)	8
Alma Valencia (MEX)	2
Cameron Guerin (USA)	0
Alexandria Town (CAN)	10

Final
Giullia Penalber (BRA)	9^{F}
Alexandria Town (CAN)	2
Bronze medal
Alma Valencia (MEX)	4
Cameron Guerin (USA)	7

==== Women's freestyle 59 kg ====
28 May

Pos	Athlete	Pld	W	L	CP	TP	USA	CAN	BRA
1	Maya Nelson (USA)	2	2	0	7	17	—	5–5	12–2
2	Linda Morais (CAN)	2	1	1	5	15	1–3 PO1	—	10–0
3	Karoline Santana (BRA)	2	0	2	1	2	1–4 SU1	0–4 SU	—

Source: UWW

==== Women's freestyle 62 kg ====
29 May

Pos	Athlete	Pld	W	L	CP	TP	MEX	ECU	CAN
1	Alejandra Romero (MEX)	2	2	0	6	13	—	10–0	5–0
2	Leonela Ayoví (ECU)	2	1	1	4	7	0–4 SU	—	4–0 Fall
3	Jessica Brouillette (CAN)	2	0	2	1	4	0–3 PO	0–5 FA	—

Source: UWW

Pos	Athlete	Pld	W	L	CP	TP	USA	BRA	COL
1	Kayla Miracle (USA)	2	2	0	8	21	—	11–1	10–0
2	Laís Nunes (BRA)	2	1	1	6	11	1–4 SU1	—	10–0 Fall
3	Jessica Torres (COL)	2	0	2	0	0	0–4 SU	0–5 FA	—

Source: UWW

Semifinals
Alejandra Romero (MEX)	0
Laís Nunes (BRA)	5
Kayla Miracle (USA)	11
Leonela Ayoví (ECU)	0

Final
Laís Nunes (BRA)	0
Kayla Miracle (USA)	6
Bronze medal
Alejandra Romero (MEX)	11
Leonela Ayoví (ECU)	0

==== Women's freestyle 65 kg ====
28 May

Pos	Athlete	Pld	W	L	CP	TP	USA	PAN	BRA
1	Jennifer Rogers (USA)	2	2	0	9	16	—	11–1	5–0 Fall
2	Ashley Zárate (PAN)	2	1	1	4	8	1–4 SU1	—	7–4
3	Meiriele Hora (BRA)	2	0	2	1	4	0–5 FA	1–3 PO1	—

Source: UWW

Pos	Athlete	Pld	W	L	CP	TP	PER	CAN	GUA
1	Diana Cruz (PER)	2	2	0	8	21	—	3–2	11–3
2	Amanda Savard (CAN)	2	1	1	6	11	1–3 PO1	—	4–3
3	Silvia Hernández (GUA)	2	0	2	0	0	1–3 PO1	1–3 PO1	—

Source: UWW

Semifinals
Jennifer Rogers (USA)	11
Amanda Savard (CAN)	0
Diana Cruz (PER)	2
Ashley Zárate (PAN)	4

Final
Jennifer Rogers (USA)	4^{F}
Ashley Zárate (PAN)	0
Bronze medal
Amanda Savard (CAN)	2
Diana Cruz (PER)	1

==== Women's freestyle 68 kg ====
29 May

Quarterfinals		Semifinals		Final
Yessica Oviedo (DOM)	10
Luz Vázquez (ARG)	0	Yessica Oviedo (DOM)	3
Ámbar Garnica (MEX)	12	Ámbar Garnica (MEX)	2
Nicoll Parrado (COL)	2			Yessica Oviedo (DOM)	4
Gabriela Rocha (BRA)	5^{F}			Tamyra Mensah-Stock (USA)	10
Isidora Díaz (CHI)	0	Gabriela Rocha (BRA)	0
Alexia Sherland (CAN)	0	Tamyra Mensah-Stock (USA)	2^{F}
Tamyra Mensah-Stock (USA)	10

Bronze medals
Luz Vázquez (ARG)	2^{F}
Ámbar Garnica (MEX)	3
Alexia Sherland (CAN)	0
Gabriela Rocha (BRA)	10

==== Women's freestyle 72 kg ====
28 May

Pos	Athlete	Pld	W	L	CP	TP	USA	PER	BRA
1	Alexandria Glaudé (USA)	2	2	0	9	14	—	4–0 Fall	10–0
2	Yanet Sovero (PER)	2	1	1	4	11	0–5 FA	—	11–0
3	Brenda Aguiar (BRA)	2	0	2	1	2	0–4 SU	0–4 SU	—

Source: UWW

==== Women's freestyle 76 kg ====
29 May

Pos	Athlete	Pld	W	L	CP	TP	USA	ECU	BRA	ESA	COL
1	Adeline Gray (USA)	4	4	0	17	24	—	12–2	8–0	4–0 Fall	WO
2	Génesis Reasco (ECU)	4	3	1	14	25	1–4 SU1	—	11–0	12–2	WO
3	Aline Ferreira (BRA)	4	2	2	8	2	0–3 PO	0–4 SU	—	2–1	WO
4	Josselyn Portillo (ESA)	4	1	3	7	3	0–5 FA	1–4 SU1	1–3 PO1	—	WO
—	Luisa Mosquera (COL)	4	0	4	0	0	0–5 FO	0–5 FO	0–5 FO	0–5 FO	—

Source: UWW
