= John Stefanowicz =

American Greco-Roman wrestler

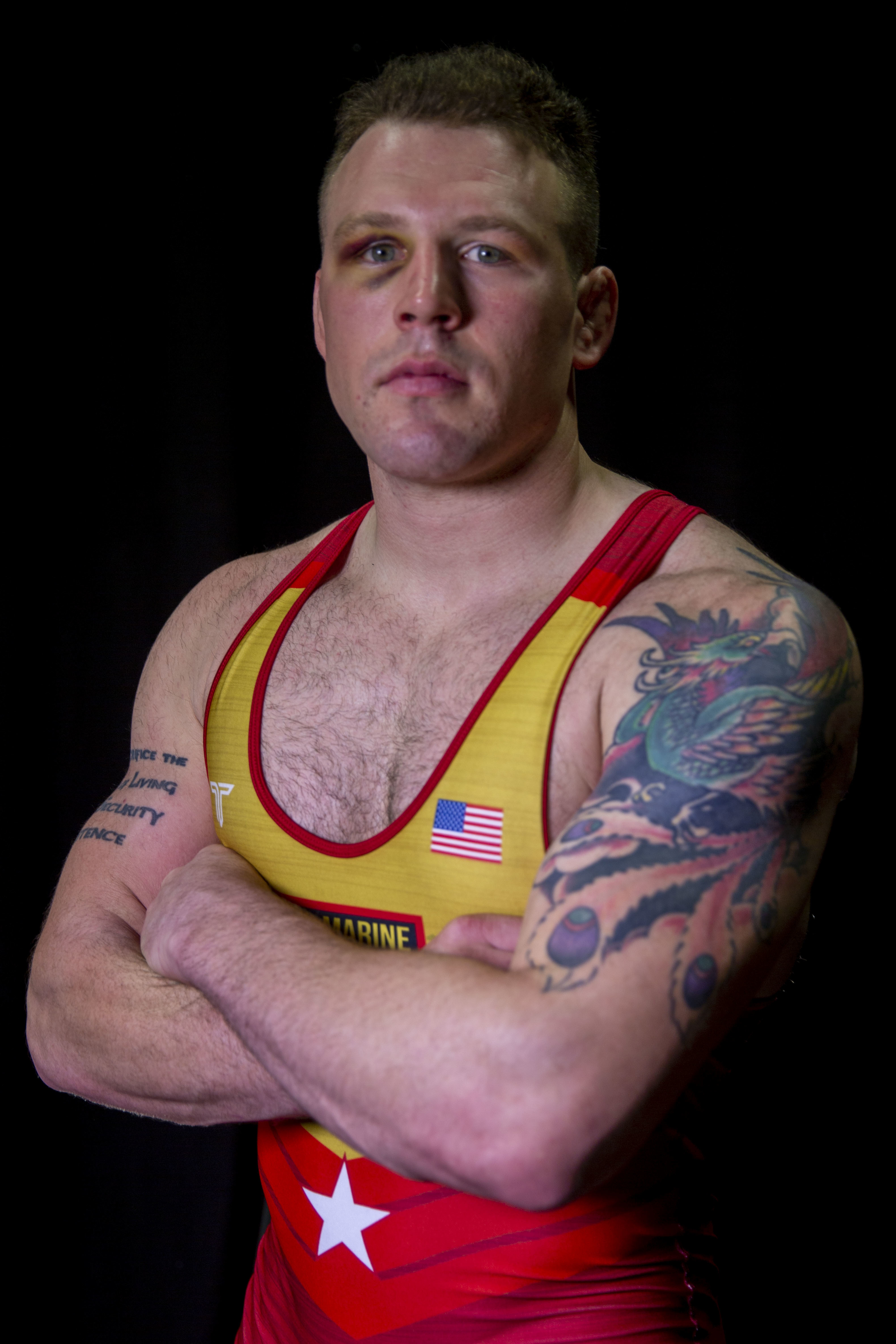
- Stefanowicz in 2021

Personal information
- Born: September 20, 1991 (age 34) Baltimore, Maryland, U.S.
- Home town: Fawn Grove, Pennsylvania, U.S.
- Relative: Chance Marsteller (brother)

Sport
- Country: United States
- Sport: Amateur wrestling
- Weight class: 87 kg
- Event: Greco-Roman
- Club: U.S. Marine Corps
- Team: USA
Medal record
Men's Greco-Roman wrestling
Representing United States
Pan American Championships
Gold medal – first place	2020 Ottawa	82 kg
Gold medal – first place	2021 Guatemala City	87 kg
World Military Championships
Bronze medal – third place	2023 Baku	87 kg
Armed Forces Championships (Greco-Roman)
Gold medal – first place	2018 Camp Lejeune	82 kg
Gold medal – first place	2019 El Paso	82 kg
Gold medal – first place	2020 Kitsap	82 kg
Gold medal – first place	2023 Colorado Springs	87 kg
Silver medal – second place	2013 Fort Dix	74 kg
Silver medal – second place	2014 Camp Lejeune	75 kg
Silver medal – second place	2017 Fort Dix	75 kg
Armed Forces Championships (Freestyle)
Gold medal – first place	2018 Camp Lejeune	92 kg
Gold medal – first place	2020 Kitsap	86 kg
Gold medal – first place	2023 Colorado Springs	87 kg
Silver medal – second place	2013 Fort Dix	74 kg
Silver medal – second place	2014 Camp Lejeune	74 kg
Silver medal – second place	2017 Fort Dix	74 kg
Silver medal – second place	2019 El Paso	86 kg
Haparanda Cup
Gold medal – first place	2019 Haparanda	87 kg
Bronze medal – third place	2018 Haparanda	82 kg

John Stefanowicz (born September 20, 1991) is an American Greco-Roman wrestler. He is a USA Olympian as a member of the Tokyo 2020 Olympic team that competed in August 2021. In 2023, he earned a world bronze medal at the 2023 CISM Military World Championships held in Baku, Azerbaijan. He is a two-time gold medalist at the Pan American Wrestling Championships.

Stefanowicz won the Olympic Trials at 87 kg, qualifying him for the 2020 Summer Olympics. In the finals he beat Joe Rau in a controversial match. He competed in the men's 87 kg event at the Olympics, finishing 12th overall.

Stefanowicz wrestled for the United States Marine Corps, becoming the first Marine member of the U.S. Olympic wrestling team since 1992. He holds the rank of Gunnery Sergeant. Following the Olympics, he moved to Annapolis, Maryland where he was a combative instructor and military representative coach to the U.S. Naval Academy wrestling team.
