= 2019 World Wrestling Championships – Men's Greco-Roman 130 kg =

Men's Greco-Roman 130 kg at the 2019 World Championships
- Venue: Barys Arena
- Dates: 16–17 September 2019
- Competitors: 31 from 31 nations

Medalists
gold medal	Rıza Kayaalp	Turkey
silver medal	Óscar Pino	Cuba
bronze medal	Heiki Nabi	Estonia
bronze medal	Iakobi Kajaia	Georgia

The men's Greco-Roman 130 kilograms is a competition featured at the 2019 World Wrestling Championships, and was held in Nur-Sultan, Kazakhstan on 16 and 17 September.

This Greco-Roman wrestling competition consists of a single-elimination tournament, with a repechage used to determine the winner of two bronze medals. The two finalists face off for gold and silver medals. Each wrestler who loses to one of the two finalists moves into the repechage, culminating in a pair of bronze medal matches featuring the semifinal losers each facing the remaining repechage opponent from their half of the bracket.

== Results ==
Legend

- C — Won by 3 cautions given to the opponent
- F — Won by fall

=== Final ===
Final
Óscar Pino (CUB)	1
Rıza Kayaalp (TUR)	3

=== Top half ===
Round of 32
Amir Ghasemi Monjazi (IRI)	3
Štěpán David (CZE)	1
Miloslav Metodiev (BUL)	1
Muminjon Abdullaev (UZB)	3
Marko Koščević (CRO)	2
Mykola Kuchmii (UKR)	1
Rafał Krajewski (POL)	0
Murat Ramonov (KGZ)	10^{F}
Konsta Mäenpää (FIN)	3
Mansur Shadukayev (KAZ)	8^{F}
Óscar Pino (CUB)	9
Naveen Sevlia (IND)	0
Moisés Pérez (VEN)	0
Heiki Nabi (EST)	9

Round of 16
Sergey Semenov (RUS)	4
Amir Ghasemi Monjazi (IRI)	6
Muminjon Abdullaev (UZB)	6
Marko Koščević (CRO)	1
Murat Ramonov (KGZ)	2
Mansur Shadukayev (KAZ)	1
Óscar Pino (CUB)	2
Heiki Nabi (EST)	1

Quarterfinals
Amir Ghasemi Monjazi (IRI)	3
Muminjon Abdullaev (UZB)	1
Murat Ramonov (KGZ)	4
Óscar Pino (CUB)	6

Semifinals
Amir Ghasemi Monjazi (IRI)	2
Óscar Pino (CUB)	6

=== Bottom half ===
Round of 32
Kim Min-seok (KOR)	1
Eduard Popp (GER)	3
Beka Kandelaki (AZE)	4^{F}
Pavel Rudakou (BLR)	0
Luciano del Río (ARG)	1
Mantas Knystautas (LTU)	2
Arata Sonoda (JPN)	1
Abdellatif Mohamed (EGY)	3
Alin Alexuc-Ciurariu (ROU)	6
Bálint Lám (HUN)	3
Oskar Marvik (NOR)	1
Iakobi Kajaia (GEO)	5
Rıza Kayaalp (TUR)	4
Yasmani Acosta (CHI)	0
Meng Lingzhe (CHN)	3
Adam Coon (USA)	1

Round of 16
Eduard Popp (GER)	17
Beka Kandelaki (AZE)	7
Mantas Knystautas (LTU)	1
Abdellatif Mohamed (EGY)	5^{F}
Alin Alexuc-Ciurariu (ROU)	0
Iakobi Kajaia (GEO)	9
Rıza Kayaalp (TUR)	4
Meng Lingzhe (CHN)	0

Quarterfinals
Eduard Popp (GER)	2
Abdellatif Mohamed (EGY)	1
Iakobi Kajaia (GEO)	1
Rıza Kayaalp (TUR)	5

Semifinals
Eduard Popp (GER)	1
Rıza Kayaalp (TUR)	4

=== Repechage ===
Repechage round 1
Naveen Sevlia (IND)	0
Heiki Nabi (EST)	9
Yasmani Acosta (CHI)	3
Meng Lingzhe (CHN)	0

Repechage round 2
Heiki Nabi (EST)	3
Murat Ramonov (KGZ)	1
Yasmani Acosta (CHI)	1
Iakobi Kajaia (GEO)	2

Bronze medals
Heiki Nabi (EST)	8^{C}
Amir Ghasemi Monjazi (IRI)	0
Iakobi Kajaia (GEO)	5
Eduard Popp (GER)	0
