= 2017 Pan American Wrestling Championships =

2017 Pan American Championship
- Host city: Salvador da Bahia, Brazil
- Dates: 5–7 May

Champions
- Freestyle: United States
- Greco-Roman: United States
- Women: Canada

The 2017 Pan American Wrestling Championships was held in Salvador da Bahia, Brazil, from 5 to 7 May 2017.

== Medal table ==
* Host nation (Brazil)

Rank	Nation	Gold	Silver	Bronze	Total
1	United States (USA)	11	0	6	17
2	Cuba (CUB)	7	2	4	13
3	Canada (CAN)	5	2	4	11
4	Ecuador (ECU)	1	0	4	5
5	Dominican Republic (DOM)	0	5	1	6
6	Brazil (BRA)*	0	4	3	7
7	Venezuela (VEN)	0	2	8	10
8	Colombia (COL)	0	2	4	6
9	Puerto Rico (PUR)	0	2	2	4
10	Peru (PER)	0	2	1	3
11	Mexico (MEX)	0	1	4	5
12	Chile (CHI)	0	1	1	2
13	El Salvador (ESA)	0	1	0	1
14	Argentina (ARG)	0	0	2	2
Totals (14 entries)		24	24	44	92

== Team ranking ==
Rank	Men's freestyle		Men's Greco-Roman		Women's freestyle	
Rank	Team	Points	Team	Points	Team	Points
1	United States	70	United States	59	Canada	71
2	Cuba	63	Cuba	49	United States	60
3	Canada	52	Brazil	47	Brazil	54
4	Venezuela	36	Venezuela	45	Venezuela	39
5	Colombia	30	Dominican Republic	39	Colombia	32
6	Dominican Republic	30	Mexico	36	Peru	27
7	Brazil	30	Colombia	32	Mexico	27
8	Puerto Rico	22	Ecuador	26	Puerto Rico	17
9	Chile	19	Chile	21	Argentina	14
10	Peru	18	Peru	15	Dominican Republic	9

== Medal summary ==
=== Men's freestyle ===
Event	Gold	Silver	Bronze
57 kg	Tyler Lee Graff; United States	Aso Palani; Canada	Reineri Andreu; Cuba
57 kg	Tyler Lee Graff; United States	Aso Palani; Canada	Wber Muñoz; Colombia
61 kg	Dabian Jaime; Cuba	David Washington Moreira; Brazil	Tommy Sanchez; Dominican Republic
61 kg	Dabian Jaime; Cuba	David Washington Moreira; Brazil	Logan Stieber; United States
65 kg	Franklin Castillo; Cuba	Franklin Gomez Matos; Puerto Rico	Dillon Williams; Canada
65 kg	Franklin Castillo; Cuba	Franklin Gomez Matos; Puerto Rico	Wilfredo Bocaney; Venezuela
70 kg	James Green; United States	Luis Isaias Mejia; El Salvador	Mauricio Javier Saltos; Ecuador
70 kg	James Green; United States	Luis Isaias Mejia; El Salvador	Carlos Romero; Chile
74 kg	Kyle Ruschell; United States	Nestor Tafur; Colombia	Luis Esteban Martinez; Cuba
74 kg	Kyle Ruschell; United States	Nestor Tafur; Colombia	Pedro Soto Cordero; Puerto Rico
86 kg	Yurieski Torreblanca; Cuba	Pedro Francisco Fuentes; Venezuela	Gabe Dean; United States
86 kg	Yurieski Torreblanca; Cuba	Pedro Francisco Fuentes; Venezuela	Jordan Steen; Canada
97 kg	Kyle Snyder; United States	Luis Miguel Pérez; Dominican Republic	Nishan Randhawa; Canada
97 kg	Kyle Snyder; United States	Luis Miguel Pérez; Dominican Republic	Andres Ramos Dinza; Cuba
125 kg	Dominique Bradley; United States	Yudenny Estevez; Cuba	Korey Jarvis; Canada
125 kg	Dominique Bradley; United States	Yudenny Estevez; Cuba	Luis Antonio Diaz; Venezuela

=== Men's Greco-Roman ===
Event	Gold	Silver	Bronze
59 kg	Andres Roberto Arroyo; Ecuador	Jancel Gonzalez; Dominican Republic	Dicther Toro; Colombia
59 kg	Andres Roberto Arroyo; Ecuador	Jancel Gonzalez; Dominican Republic	Jose Luis Durand; Peru
66 kg	Miguel Palacio; Cuba	Joílson Júnior; Brazil	Wuileixis Rivas; Venezuela
66 kg	Miguel Palacio; Cuba	Joílson Júnior; Brazil	José Jelmar Betancourt; Ecuador
71 kg	Patrick Harrison Smith; United States	Luis Alfredo de Leon; Dominican Republic	Francisco Barrio; Argentina
71 kg	Patrick Harrison Smith; United States	Luis Alfredo de Leon; Dominican Republic	Fernando Vicente Gomez; Mexico
75 kg	Yurislandy Rios; Cuba	Juan Angel Escobar; Mexico	Luis Eduardo Rojas; Venezuela
75 kg	Yurislandy Rios; Cuba	Juan Angel Escobar; Mexico	Ângelo Moreira; Brazil
80 kg	Cheney Haight; United States	Johan Antonio Batista; Dominican Republic	Daniel Vicente Gomez; Mexico
80 kg	Cheney Haight; United States	Johan Antonio Batista; Dominican Republic	Enrique Javier Ortiz; Ecuador
85 kg	Ben Provisor; United States	Daniel Hechavarria; Cuba	Carlos Muñoz; Colombia
85 kg	Ben Provisor; United States	Daniel Hechavarria; Cuba	Alfonso Yepez; Mexico
98 kg	Yasmany Cabrera; Cuba	Luillys Mora; Venezuela	Davi Albino; Brazil
98 kg	Yasmany Cabrera; Cuba	Luillys Mora; Venezuela	G'Angelo Hancock; United States
130 kg	Óscar Pino; Cuba	Yasmani Acosta; Chile	Robert Timothy Smith; United States
130 kg	Óscar Pino; Cuba	Yasmani Acosta; Chile	Erwin Cabrera; Venezuela

=== Women's freestyle ===
Event	Gold	Silver	Bronze
48 kg	Victoria Anthony; United States	Thalía Mallqui; Peru	Patricia Bermúdez; Argentina
48 kg	Victoria Anthony; United States	Thalía Mallqui; Peru	Caroline Melo; Brazil
53 kg	Jessica MacDonald; Canada	Carolina Castillo; Colombia	Laura Torres; Mexico
53 kg	Jessica MacDonald; Canada	Carolina Castillo; Colombia	Luisa Valverde; Ecuador
55 kg	Becka Leathers; United States	Brianne Barry; Canada	Andribeth Belliard; Puerto Rico
58 kg	Michelle Fazzari; Canada	Yessica Oviedo; Dominican Republic	Aguis Gonzalez; Venezuela
58 kg	Michelle Fazzari; Canada	Yessica Oviedo; Dominican Republic	Kayla Miracle; United States
60 kg	Allison Ragan; United States	Nes Marie Rodríguez; Puerto Rico	Laurence Beauregard; Canada
63 kg	Braxton Stone; Canada	Yanet Sovero; Peru	Nathaly Grimán; Venezuela
63 kg	Braxton Stone; Canada	Yanet Sovero; Peru	Yaquelin Estornell; Cuba
69 kg	Olivia di Bacco; Canada	Dailane dos Reis; Brazil	Maria Jose Acosta; Venezuela
69 kg	Olivia di Bacco; Canada	Dailane dos Reis; Brazil	Forrest Molinari; United States
75 kg	Justina di Stasio; Canada	Aline Ferreira; Brazil	Andrea Olaya; Colombia
