= Óscar Pino =

Cuban wrestler (born 1993)

Personal information
- Full name: Óscar Pino Hinds
- Born: 26 October 1993 (age 33)

Sport
- Country: Cuba
- Sport: Amateur wrestling
- Weight class: 125 kg (freestyle); 130 kg (Greco-Roman)
- Events: Freestyle; Greco-Roman
Medal record
Men's Greco-Roman wrestling
Representing Cuba
World Championships
Silver medal – second place	2019 Nur-Sultan	130 kg
Bronze medal – third place	2017 Paris	130 kg
Bronze medal – third place	2018 Budapest	130 kg
Bronze medal – third place	2023 Belgrade	130 kg
Pan American Games
Gold medal – first place	2023 Santiago	130 kg
Central American and Caribbean Games
Gold medal – first place	2026 Santo Domingo	130 kg
Pan American Championships
Gold medal – first place	2016 Frisco	130 kg
Gold medal – first place	2017 Lauro de Freitas	130 kg
Gold medal – first place	2018 Lima	130 kg
Gold medal – first place	2022 Acapulco	130 kg
Gold medal – first place	2023 Buenos Aires	130 kg
Gold medal – first place	2025 Monterrey	130 kg
Silver medal – second place	2024 Acapulco	130 kg
Silver medal – second place	2026 Coralville	130 kg
Men's freestyle wrestling
Representing Cuba
Pan American Games
Silver medal – second place	2019 Lima	125 kg
Pan American Championships
Bronze medal – third place	2019 Buenos Aires	125 kg
Bronze medal – third place	2020 Ottawa	125 kg

Óscar Pino Hinds (Note: In this Spanish name, the first or paternal surname is Pino and the second or maternal family name is Hinds.) (born 26 October 1993) is a Cuban wrestler competing both in Greco-Roman and freestyle competitions.

== Career ==
In 2016, he won the gold medal in the men's Greco-Roman 130 kg event at the Pan American Wrestling Championships held in Frisco, United States. He repeated this in the same event at the Pan American Wrestling Championships in 2017 and 2018. In 2019 and 2020, he competed in the men's freestyle 125 kg event winning a bronze medal on both occasions.

At the World Wrestling Championships he won a total of three medals: in 2019 he won the silver medal and both in 2017 and in 2018 he won one of the bronze medals.

He won the gold medal in his event at the 2022 Pan American Wrestling Championships held in Acapulco, Mexico.

He won the gold medal in the 130 kg event at the 2023 Pan American Games held in Santiago, Chile.

== Achievements ==
Year	Tournament	Location	Result	Event
2017	World Championships	Paris, France	3rd	Greco-Roman 130 kg
2019	World Championships	Nur-Sultan, Kazakhstan	2nd	Greco-Roman 130 kg
