= Carlos Romero (wrestler, born 1997) =

Chilean wrestler

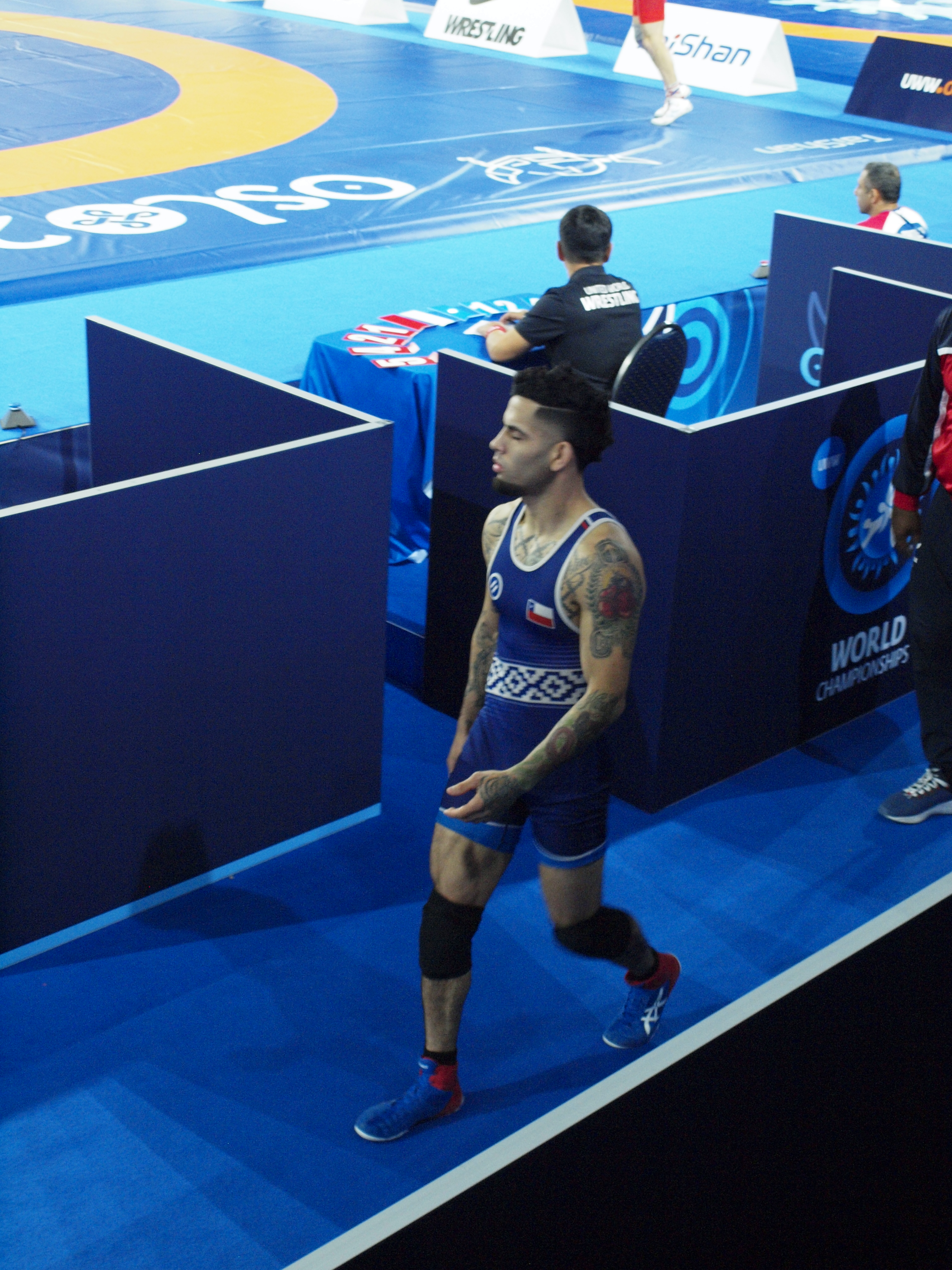

Personal information
- Full name: Carlos Eduardo Romero Millaqueo
- Born: 2 January 1997 (age 29) Chile
- Height: 1.77 m (5 ft 10 in)
- Weight: 70 kg (154 lb)

Sport
- Sport: Amateur wrestling
- Event: Freestyle
- Club: Weichan Wrestling Club
Medal record
Men's freestyle wrestling
Representing Chile
Pan American Championships
Silver medal – second place	2021 Guatemala City	70 kg
Bronze medal – third place	2017 Lauro de Freitas	70 kg
South American Championships
Bronze medal – third place	2015 Buenos Aires	65 kg

Carlos Eduardo Romero Millaqueo (Note: In this Spanish name, the first or paternal surname is Romero and the second or maternal family name is Millaqueo.) (born 2 January 1997) is a Chilean freestyle wrestler who currently competes at 70 kilograms. Romero is a two–time medalist of the Pan American Continental Championships (2017 and 2021).

== Career ==
A late starter, Romero started competing internationally when he was 18 years old in 2015. He has competed multiple times at a variety of events, such as the World Championships (junior level), the Pan American Championships (five times, including thrice as a junior), the South American Championships (twice) and a couple of Grand Prixes.

== Major results ==
Year	Tournament	Location	Result	Event
2015	South American Wrestling Championships	Buenos Aires, Argentina	3rd	Freestyle 65 kg
2016	South American Wrestling Championships	Cartagena de Indias, Colombia	4th	Freestyle 70 kg
2016	Brazil Cup	Rio de Janeiro, Brazil	3rd	Freestyle 70 kg
2017	Pan American Wrestling Championships	Lauro de Freitas, Brazil	3rd	Freestyle 70 kg
2017	Waclaw Ziolkowski Memorial	Warsaw, Poland	15th	Freestyle 70 kg
2018	Pan American Wrestling Championships	Lima, Peru	5th	Freestyle 74 kg
2020	Granma y Cerro Pelado	Havana, Cuba	8th	Freestyle 74 kg
2021	Dan Kolov – Nikola Petrov	Plovdiv, Bulgaria	8th	Freestyle 74 kg
2021	Pan American Wrestling Championships	Guatemala City, Guatemala	2nd	Freestyle 70 kg
