= Wrestling at the 2023 Pan American Games – Men's Greco-Roman 130 kg =

Men's Greco-Roman 130 at the 2023 Pan American Games
- Venue: Olympic Training Center in Ñuñoa
- Dates: November 4
- Competitors: 9 from 9 nations

Medalists
Gold medal	Óscar Pino	Cuba
Silver medal	Cohlton Schultz	United States
Bronze medal	Yasmani Acosta	Chile
Bronze medal	Moisés Pérez	Venezuela

The men's Greco-Roman 130 kg competition of the Wrestling events at the 2023 Pan American Games in Ñuñoa was held on November 4.

== Qualification ==
The winner of each weight category at the 2021 Junior Pan American Games in Cali, Colombia qualified directly, along with the top four at the 2022 Pan American Wrestling Championships and 2023 Pan American Wrestling Championships. The host country (Chile) is guaranteed a spot in each event, but its athletes must compete in both the 2022 and 2023 Pan American Championship. If Chile does not qualify at any of the first two events, it will take the fourth spot available at the 2023 Pan American Championships. A further six wildcards (four men and two women) will be awarded to nations without any qualified athlete but took part in the qualification tournaments.

== Schedule ==
All times are local (UTC−3)

Date	Time	Event
Wednesday, 4 November 2023	10:00	Round of 16
Wednesday, 4 November 2023	11:00	Quarterfinals
Wednesday, 4 November 2023	12:00	Semifinals
Wednesday, 4 November 2023	17:00	Finals

== Results ==
Legend

- C — Won by 3 cautions given to the opponent
- F — Won by fall

=== Main Bracket ===
Round of 16
Gino Ávila (HON)	2
Leo Santana (DOM)	1

Quarterfinals
Eduard Soghomonyan (BRA)	9
Gino Ávila (HON)	0
Yasmani Acosta (CHI)	1
Óscar Pino (CUB)	3
Edgardo López (PUR)	0
Cohlton Schultz (USA)	6^{F}
Moisés Pérez (VEN)	5
Paul Morales (MEX)	1

Semifinals
Eduard Soghomonyan (BRA)	0
Óscar Pino (CUB)	11^{C}
Cohlton Schultz (USA)	5
Moisés Pérez (VEN)	2

Finals
Óscar Pino (CUB)	6
Cohlton Schultz (USA)	0

=== Repechage ===
Bronze medal match
Yasmani Acosta (CHI)	9
Eduard Soghomonyan (BRA)	0
Edgardo López (PUR)	2
Moisés Pérez (VEN)	10

== Final standing ==
Rank	Athlete
1st place, gold medalist(s)	Óscar Pino (CUB)
2nd place, silver medalist(s)	Cohlton Schultz (USA)
3rd place, bronze medalist(s)	Yasmani Acosta (CHI)
3rd place, bronze medalist(s)	Moisés Pérez (VEN)
5	Eduard Soghomonyan (BRA)
5	Edgardo López (PUR)
7	Gino Ávila (HON)
8	Leo Santana (DOM)
9	Paul Morales (MEX)
