= Cohlton Schultz =

American Greco-Roman wrestler (born 2000)

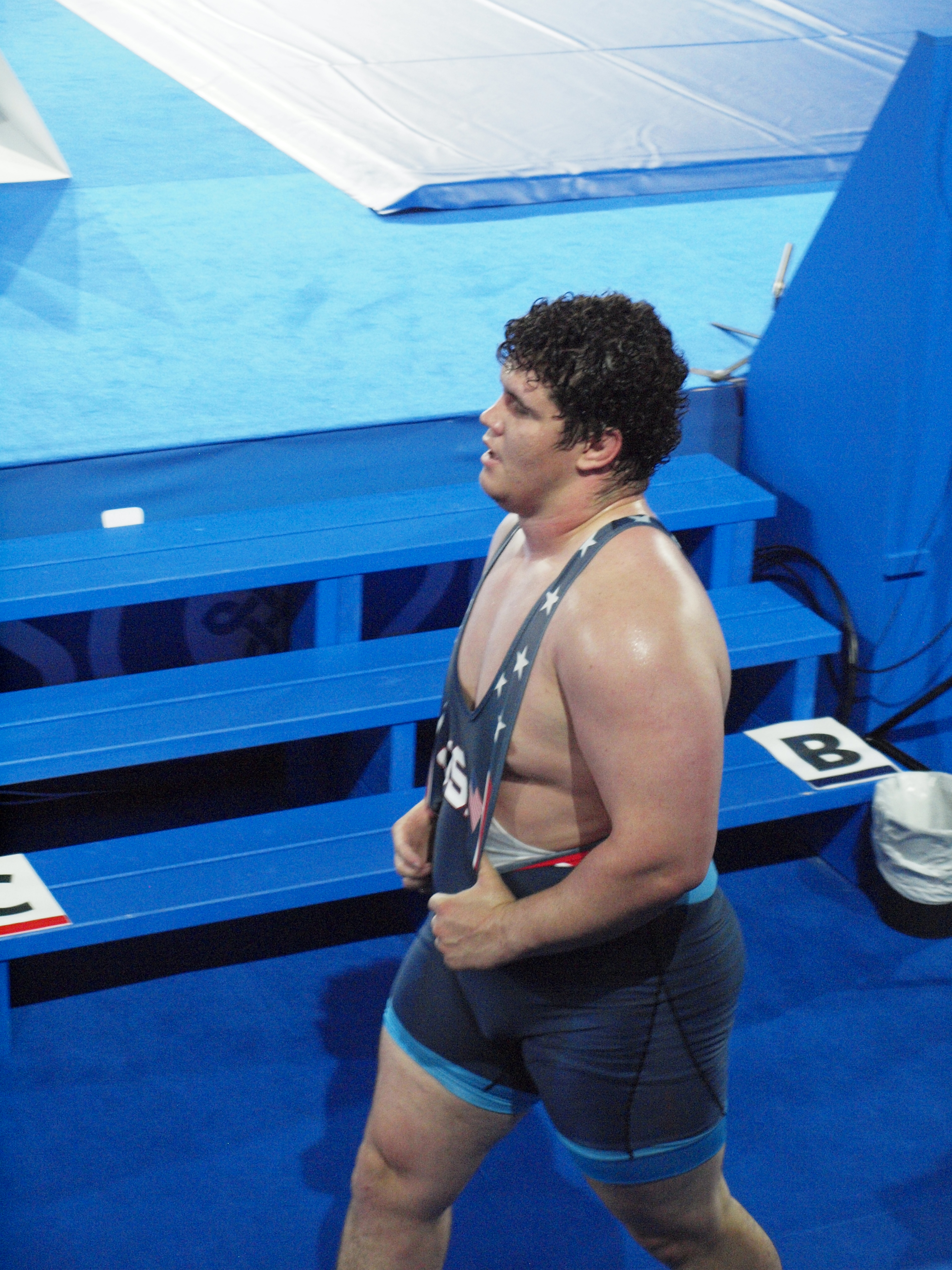
- Schultz at the 2021 World Championships

Personal information
- Full name: Cohlton Michael Schultz
- Born: September 27, 2000 (age 26) Parker, Colorado, U.S.
- Height: 1.88 m (6 ft 2 in)
- Weight: 130 kg (290 lb)

Sport
- Country: United States
- Sport: Wrestling
- Weight class: 130 kg (290 lb)
- Events: Greco-Roman and Folkstyle
- College team: Arizona State
- Club: U.S. OTC; Sunkist Kids Wrestling Club
- Coached by: Ike Anderson
Medal record
Men's Greco-Roman wrestling
Representing United States
Pan American Games
Silver medal – second place	2023 Santiago	130 kg
Pan American Championships
Gold medal – first place	2026 Coralville	130 kg
Silver medal – second place	2025 Monterrey	130 kg
Bronze medal – third place	2024 Acapulco	130 kg
Grand Prix
Silver medal – second place	2026 Zagreb	130 kg
World Juniors Championships
Silver medal – second place	2019 Tallinn	130 kg
Bronze medal – third place	2018 Trnava	130 kg
World Cadets Championships
Gold medal – first place	2017 Athens	100 kg
Men's collegiate wrestling
NCAA Division I Championships
Silver medal – second place	2022 Detroit	285 lb
Bronze medal – third place	2025 Philadelphia	285 lb
Big 12 Championships
Silver medal – second place	2025 Tulsa	285 lb
Pac-12 Championships
Gold medal – first place	2021 Corvallis	285 lb
Gold medal – first place	2022 Tempe	285 lb
Gold medal – first place	2023 Stanford	285 lb
Gold medal – first place	2024 Corvallis	285 lb

Cohlton Michael Schultz (born September 27, 2000) is an American Greco-Roman wrestler competing in the 130 kg division. He won the silver medal in the 130 kg event at the 2023 Pan American Games held in Santiago, Chile.

== Career ==
Schultz is a wrestler for the Arizona State Sun Devils who is an NCAA All-American and a Cadet Greco-Roman World Champion as a representative of the United States. He has also earned Junior World Championships podium finishes twice with a bronze medal in 2017 and a silver medal in 2018.

Schultz won the silver medal in the 130 kg event at the 2023 Pan American Games held in Santiago, Chile.

He won a bronze medal in his event at the 2024 Pan American Wrestling Championships held in Acapulco, Mexico. A few days later, at the Pan American Wrestling Olympic Qualification Tournament held in Acapulco, Mexico, he earned a quota place for the United States for the 2024 Summer Olympics held in Paris, France.
