= Meng Qiang =

Chinese Greco-Roman wrestler

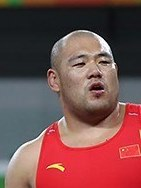
- Meng at the 2016 Summer Olympics

Personal information
- Nationality: China
- Born: 3 July 1987 (age 39)
- Height: 1.86 m (6 ft 1 in)
- Weight: 122 kg (269 lb)

Sport
- Sport: Greco-Roman wrestling

Meng Qiang (born 3 July 1987) is a Chinese Greco-Roman wrestler. He competed in the 130 kg event at the 2016 Summer Olympics and was eliminated in the round of 16 by Bashir Babajanzadeh, from Iran.
