= Liu Deli =

Chinese wrestler (born 1980)

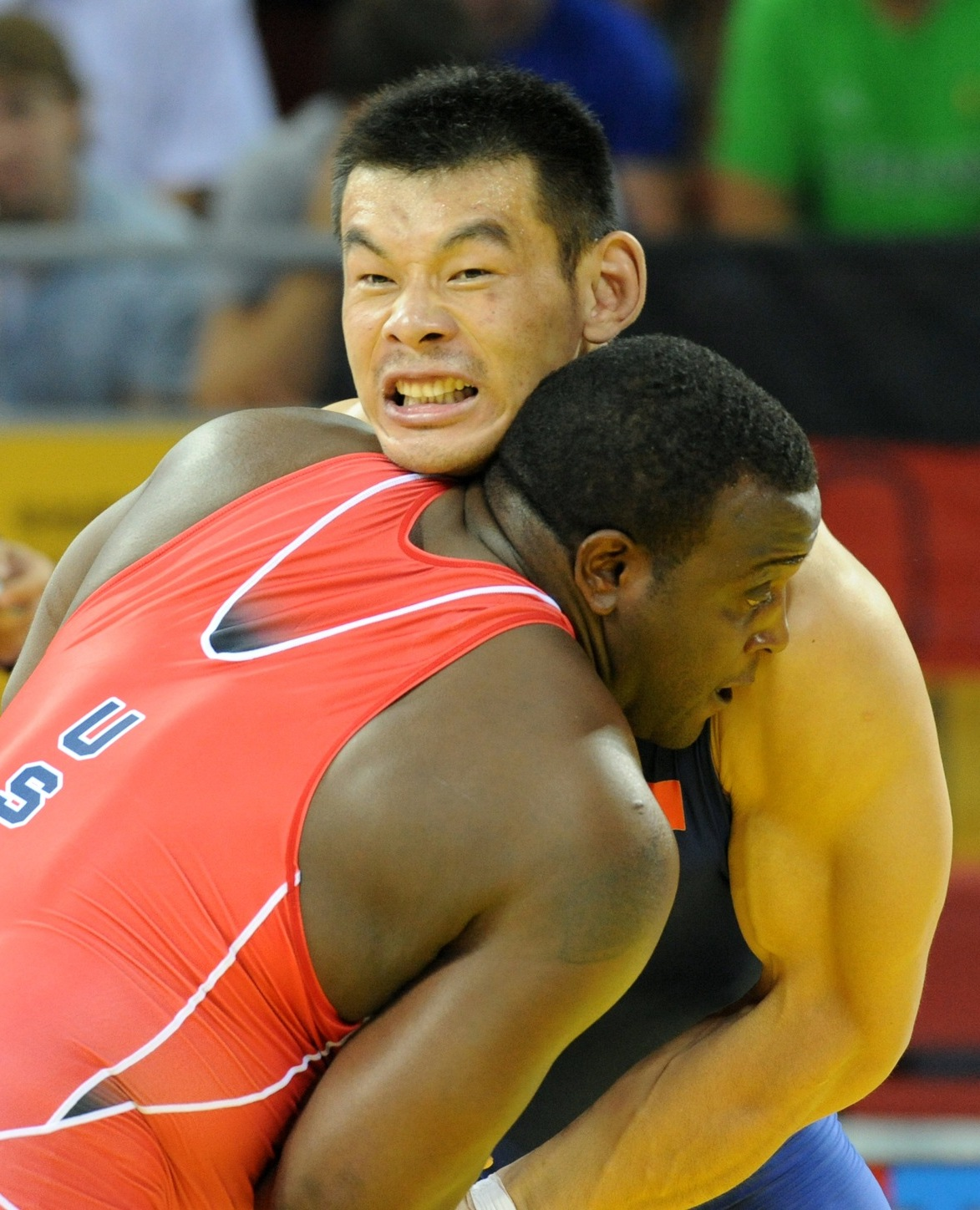
- Liu Deli vs. Dremiel Byers at the 2008 Olympics

Personal information
- Born: January 1, 1980 (age 46) Heilongjiang, China
- Height: 2.03 m (6 ft 8 in)
- Weight: 120 kg (265 lb)

Sport
- Sport: Greco-Roman wrestling
- Club: Heilongjiang Wrestling Club
- Coached by: Wang Changsheng
Medal record
Representing China
Asian Championships
Gold medal – first place	2007	120 kg
Asian Games
Silver medal – second place	2010 Guangzhou	120 kg

Liu Deli (劉德利; born January 1, 1980) is a Chinese wrestler who competed at the 2008 and 2012 Summer Olympics in the Greco-Roman super-heavyweight division. In 2008, he lost in the third round to Dremiel Byers, and in 2012, he lost in the first round to Mihály Deák-Bárdos.

Liu Deli won the 2007 Asian Championships, and finished second at the 2010 Asian Games.
