= Ali Nadhim =

Iraqi Greco-Roman wrestler

Ali Nadhim Salman
Personal information
- Full name: Ali Nadhim Salman
- Nationality: (Iraq) Iraqi
- Born: 15 December 1981 (age 44) Baghdad, Iraq
- Height: 1.90 m (6 ft 3 in)
- Weight: 120 kg (265 lb)

Sport
- Country: Iraq
- Sport: Greco-Roman wrestling
- Event: Men's 120kg
- Club: Air Force Sports Club, Iraq
- Coached by: Jamal Nasser

Achievements and titles
- Olympic finals: London 2012 (Qualification)

Ali Nadhim Salman (Arabic: علي ناظم سلمان, born 15 December 1981) is an Iraqi Greco-Roman wrestler, best known for representing Iraq at London 2012 in the Men's 120kg Greco-Roman event. He was defeated in the qualification round by Bashir Babajanzadeh.
