= Kim Gwang-seok (wrestler) =

South Korean wrestler

Medal record

Representing South Korea

Men's Greco-Roman wrestling
Gold medal – first place	2006 Doha	120 kg

Kim Gwang Seok is a South Korean Greco-Roman Wrestler. He won gold medal at 2006 Asian Games at Doha in 120 kg match.
