= Kyle Snyder (wrestler) =

American freestyle wrestler (born 1995)

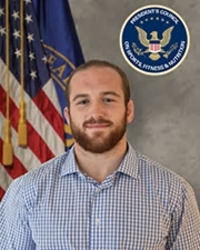
- Snyder for the President's Council on Sports, Fitness & Nutrition

Personal information
- Full name: Kyle Frederick Snyder
- Born: November 20, 1995 (age 31) Woodbine, Maryland, U.S.
- Height: 5 ft 11 in (180 cm)
- Weight: 97 kg (214 lb)
- Website: snyderwrestling.com

Sport
- Country: United States
- Sport: Wrestling
- Events: Freestyle and Folkstyle
- College team: Ohio State
- Club: Nittany Lion Wrestling Club; Titan Mercury Wrestling Club
- Team: USA
- Coached by: Cael Sanderson; Tom Ryan
Medal record
Event	1st	2nd	3rd
Olympic Games	1	1	0
World Championship	5	2	2
Pan American Championships	7	0	0
Pan American Games	3	0	0
World Cup	2	1	0
Other	14	1	6
Total	30	5	8
Men's freestyle wrestling
Representing the United States
Olympic Games
Gold medal – first place	2016 Rio de Janeiro	97 kg
Silver medal – second place	2020 Tokyo	97 kg
World Championships
Gold medal – first place	2015 Las Vegas	97 kg
Gold medal – first place	2017 Paris	97 kg
Gold medal – first place	2022 Belgrade	97 kg
Gold medal – first place	2025 Zagreb	97 kg
Gold medal – first place	2026 Astana	97 kg
Silver medal – second place	2018 Budapest	97 kg
Silver medal – second place	2021 Oslo	97 kg
Bronze medal – third place	2019 Nur-Sultan	97 kg
Bronze medal – third place	2023 Belgrade	97 kg
World Cup
Gold medal – first place	2018 Iowa City	Team
Gold medal – first place	2022 Coralville	Team
Silver medal – second place	2017 Kermanshah	Team
Pan American Games
Gold medal – first place	2015 Toronto	97 kg
Gold medal – first place	2019 Lima	97 kg
Gold medal – first place	2023 Santiago	97 kg
Pan American Championships
Gold medal – first place	2017 Salvador	97 kg
Gold medal – first place	2019 Buenos Aires	97 kg
Gold medal – first place	2020 Ottawa	97 kg
Gold medal – first place	2021 Guatemala City	97 kg
Gold medal – first place	2022 Acapulco	97 kg
Gold medal – first place	2023 Buenos Aires	97 kg
Gold medal – first place	2024 Acapulco	97 kg
Yasar Dogu Tournament
Gold medal – first place	2019 Istanbul	97 kg
Bronze medal – third place	2018 Istanbul	97 kg
Dan Kolov & Nikola Petrov Tournament
Gold medal – first place	2019 Russe	97 kg
Gold medal – first place	2023 Sofia	97 kg
Golden Grand Prix Ivan Yarygin
Gold medal – first place	2017 Krasnoyarsk	97 kg
Gold medal – first place	2018 Krasnoyarsk	97 kg
Gold medal – first place	2022 Krasnoyarsk	97 kg
Bronze medal – third place	2016 Krasnoyarsk	97 kg
Grand Prix
Gold medal – first place	2017 Madrid	97 kg
Gold medal – first place	2017 Minsk	97 kg
Gold medal – first place	2019 Vladikavkaz	97 kg
Gold medal – first place	2021 Nice	97 kg
Gold medal – first place	2022 Tunis	97 kg
Gold medal – first place	2023 Zagreb	97 kg
Gold medal – first place	2023 Budapest	97 kg
Gold medal – first place	2025 Zagreb	97 kg
Silver medal – second place	2024 Zagreb	97 kg
Bronze medal – third place	2016 Dortmund	97 kg
Bronze medal – third place	2020 Rome	97 kg
Bronze medal – third place	2026 Tirana	97 kg
Junior World Championships
Gold medal – first place	2013 Sofia	96 kg
Bronze medal – third place	2014 Zagreb	96 kg
Men's collegiate wrestling
Representing the Ohio State Buckeyes
NCAA Division I Championships
Gold medal – first place	2016 New York	285 lb
Gold medal – first place	2017 St. Louis	285 lb
Gold medal – first place	2018 Cleveland	285 lb
Silver medal – second place	2015 St. Louis	197 lb
Big Ten Championships
Gold medal – first place	2016 Iowa City	285 lb
Gold medal – first place	2017 Bloomington	285 lb
Gold medal – first place	2018 East Lansing	285 lb
Silver medal – second place	2015 Columbus	197 lb

Kyle Frederick Snyder (born November 20, 1995) is an American freestyle wrestler and graduated folkstyle wrestler who competes at 97 kilograms. He currently competes in the Light Heavyweight division of Real American Freestyle (RAF), where he is the current RAF Light Heavyweight Champion.

Snyder is the youngest wrestler ever to win the world, NCAA, and Olympic championships in the same year—a triple crown of American wrestling not accomplished in a generation until he completed his sweep at the 2016 Rio Olympics.

Snyder, nicknamed "Snyderman", became the first Olympic gold medalist to return to college and win an NCAA title, clinching his second consecutive NCAA heavyweight title in 2017 despite tearing cartilage in his chest in the quarter-finals and being outweighed by upwards of 40 pounds throughout the tournament. In 2018, Snyder won his third straight individual NCAA title as a heavyweight, this time being outweighed by nearly 60 pounds "in one of the biggest size differences in an NCAA championship match in history", and became the first three-time NCAA heavyweight champion in nearly 30 years.

Along the way he became the youngest American, and only the eleventh ever, to win the Ivan Yarygin Memorial Grand Prix, widely considered the toughest open wrestling tournament in the world. Snyder dominated it with three technical-falls and then a pin in the finals. The following year Snyder became the first American man not only to win back-to-back Yarygin titles, but the only one to win the prestigious tournament more than once at all, earning him Best Foreign Wrestler honors from his Russian hosts.

In 2017, Snyder defeated Abdulrashid Sadulaev at the 2017 World Championships, marking Sadulaev's first loss in his last 75 matches and the third one in his senior career. This come-from-behind victory earned Team USA its first World Championship in over 20 years and Snyder his third consecutive individual World or Olympic championship, and led to Snyder being ranked as the best pound-for-pound freestyle wrestler on the planet by Flowrestling in September 2017, a title he would retain in their June 2018 rankings. Snyder's accomplishments led him to being named the winner of the 2017 AAU Sullivan Award, presented annually to top amateur athlete in the United States. He ended his collegiate career as the second wrestler to win the NCAA, World, and Olympic championships as a student athlete.

== Career ==
In his first three years of high school at Our Lady of Good Counsel High School in Olney, Maryland, Snyder amassed a 179–0 record, won three prep national championships, and only conceded a single takedown. Named the national high school wrestler of the year by both Intermat and ASICS, Snyder was also ranked as the #1 pound-for-pound high school wrestler in America by FloWrestling after his junior season. He spent his senior year training at the United States Olympic Training Center, competing internationally for Team USA. He won a junior world championship in 2013, while becoming the youngest two-time junior world medalist in American history in 2014.

To begin his collegiate wrestling career, Snyder accepted a scholarship from the Ohio State Buckeyes, helping them to an NCAA team championship as a true freshman by finishing as runner-up to a fifth-year senior, Iowa State's Kyven Gadson, in the national finals. A few weeks later, he defeated returning Olympic gold medalist Jake Varner to represent the U.S. on its 2015 World Team, then became the youngest world champion in American wrestling history by dethroning the reigning world champion. Snyder continued his extraordinary run by returning to Ohio State and rallying for an overtime victory over NC State's Nick Gwiazdowski, the returning back-to-back heavyweight national champion. Even giving away more than 30 pounds, Snyder ended Gwiazdowski's 88-match win streak and earn his first individual NCAA title as a true sophomore.

A few months later, Snyder won his historic gold at the 2016 Rio Olympics, capping his unprecedented streak of winning wrestling's three most prestigious championships in succession before his 21st birthday, defeating the man holding each title along the way.

After returning to Ohio State and winning his second consecutive NCAA heavyweight title at the end of an undefeated 2016–2017 wrestling season, Snyder would avenge his loss to Gadson in the finals of America's 2017 World Team Trials, sweeping him with two straight tech falls and a cumulative score of 23–2. He then faced another historic bout in the finals of the 2017 Paris World Championships: with Russia and the U.S. tied for first place at 53 points, Snyder stepped onto the mat for "The Match of the Century"—the team championship, an individual title at 97 kg, and two young legacies were on the line. His opponent was Abdulrashid Sadulaev, a young Russian phenom on a three-year undefeated streak that included two world championships as well as an Olympic gold, who was then considered the best pound-for-pound wrestler in the world.

Sadulaev moved up a weight class to challenge Snyder, and quickly took a 2–0 lead early in their finals match. Snyder battled back and tied the match 3–3 before the end of the first period, only to have Sadulaev score another takedown and regain the lead. A lead that lasted until the final 20 seconds of the match when Snyder's furious pace allowed him to score a late takedown at the edge of the mat—sealing Team USA's first World Championship in over 20 years, Snyder's third consecutive individual World or Olympic championship, and wresting the title of best pound-for-pound wrestler on the planet away from Sadulaev.

In a story recounted to The Washington Post by his college coach, Tom Ryan, after Snyder's thrilling come-from-behind overtime victory to clinch his first NCAA heavyweight title in front of a sold-out Madison Square Garden, a match chosen by fans to be the final one of the night and broadcast live in primetime to millions on ESPN – a maintenance worker approached Ryan to let him know what made Snyder, who'd already made wrestling history as America's youngest world champion and was named Most Outstanding Wrestler of those NCAA Championships, stand out from his competition the most that weekend: he'd been the only athlete in the tournament who continually thanked him for refilling the stadium's water jugs.

Snyder (USA) lost 0:10 early to Akhmed Tazhudinov (Bahrain) at the World Wrestling Championships in Belgrade 2023.

At the 2026 World Wrestling Championships, Snyder defeated Abdulrashid Sadulaev in the quarterfinals of the men's freestyle 97 kg event, winning 4–4 on criteria after overcoming a 4–1 deficit in the second period. The victory brought their head-to-head record to 3–2 in Sadulaev's favor.

== Freestyle record ==
Senior Freestyle Matches
Res.	Record	Opponent	Score	Date	Event	Location
RAF Georgia at 215 lb for the RAF Light Heavyweight Championship
Win	216-22	(Russia) Abdulrashid Sadulaev	Fall	11 July 2026	RAF Georgia	(Georgia (country)) Tbilisi, Georgia
RAF 09 at 215 lb for the RAF Light Heavyweight Championship
Win	215-22	(Georgia (country)) Givi Matcharashvili	TF 10–0	30 May 2026	RAF 09	(United States) Arlington, Texas
RAF 08 at 215 lb for the RAF Light Heavyweight Championship
Win	214-22	(Kazakhstan) Rizabek Aitmukhan	12–6	18 April 2026	RAF 08	(United States) Philadelphia, Pennsylvania
RAF 07 at 215 lb for the vacant RAF Light Heavyweight Championship
Win	213-22	(Bahrain) Akhmed Tazhudinov	3–3	28 March 2026	RAF 07	(United States) Tampa, Florida
2026 Muhamet Malo Ranking Series (bronze) at 97 kg
Win		(Azerbaijan) Magomedkhan Magomedov	FF	February 25, 2026	2026 Muhamet Malo Tournament	Tirana, Albania
Win	212-22	(Hungary) Richárd Végh	TF 10-0	February 25, 2026	2026 Muhamet Malo Tournament	Tirana, Albania
Loss	211-22	(Russia) Mukhamed-Takhir Khaniev	4-10	February 25, 2026	2026 Muhamet Malo Tournament	Tirana, Albania
Win	211-21	(Moldova) Radu Lefter	9-4	February 25, 2026	2026 Muhamet Malo Tournament	Tirana, Albania
Win	210-21	(Germany) Ertuğrul Ağca	3-0	February 25, 2026	2026 Muhamet Malo Tournament	Tirana, Albania
2025 World Championships (gold) at 97 kg
Win	209-21	(Iran) Amir Ali Azarpira	4-2	September 14-15, 2025	2025 World Championships	Zagreb, Croatia
Win	208-21	(Japan) Arash Yoshida	9-1	September 14-15, 2025	2025 World Championships	Zagreb, Croatia
Win	207-21	(Poland) Zbigniew Baranowski	5-0	September 14-15, 2025	2025 World Championships	Zagreb, Croatia
Win	206-21	(Venezuela) Cristian Sarco	TF 10–0	September 14-15, 2025	2025 World Championships	Zagreb, Croatia
2025 Final X (gold) at 97 kg
Win	205-21	(United States) Hayden Zillmer	8–2	June 14, 2025	2025 Final X	(United States) Newark, New Jersey
Win	204-21	(United States) Hayden Zillmer	8–0	June 14, 2025	2025 Final X	(United States) Newark, New Jersey
2025 US Open (gold) at 97 kg
Win	203-21	(United States) Jonathan Aiello	TF 11–0	April 23, 2025	2025 US Open	(United States) Las Vegas, Nevada
Win	202-21	(United States) Gavin Hoffman	TF 10–0	April 23, 2025	2025 US Open	(United States) Las Vegas, Nevada
Win	201-21	(United States) Tyrie Houghton	TF 10–0	April 23, 2025	2025 US Open	(United States) Las Vegas, Nevada
Win	200-21	(United States) Austin Kohlhofer	TF 10–0	April 23, 2025	2025 US Open	(United States) Las Vegas, Nevada
2025 Muhamet Malo Tournament (bronze) at 97 kg
Win	199–21	(Georgia (country)) Dato Piruzashvili	TF 11–0	February 27, 2025	2025 Muhamet Malo Tournament	Tirana, Albania
Loss	198–21	(Japan) Arash Yoshida	5–5	February 27, 2025	2025 Muhamet Malo Tournament	Tirana, Albania
Win	198–20	(Belarus) Aliaksandr Hushtyn	3–0	February 27, 2025	2025 Muhamet Malo Tournament	Tirana, Albania
Win	197–20	(Iran) Mojtaba Goleij	3–2	February 27, 2025	2025 Muhamet Malo Tournament	Tirana, Albania
Win	196–20	(Kazakhstan) Rizabek Aitmukhan	8–0	February 25, 2025	PWL 8	Almaty, Kazakhstan
Win	195–20	(Russia) Konstantin Pshenichnikov	7–3	February 25, 2025	PWL 8	Almaty, Kazakhstan
2025 Zagreb Open (gold) at 97 kg
Win	194-20	(Iran) Abolfazl Babaloo	TF 12-1	February 6, 2025	2025 Zagreb Open	Zagreb, Croatia
Win	193-20	(Slovakia) Batyrbek Tsakulov	TF 10–0	February 6, 2025	2025 Zagreb Open	Zagreb, Croatia
Win	192-20	(Hungary) Richárd Végh	TF 11-0	February 6, 2025	2025 Zagreb Open	Zagreb, Croatia
2024 Bill Farrell Memorial International (gold) at 97 kg
Win	191-20	(United States) Michael Macchiavello	TF 11-1	November 8-9, 2024	2024 Bill Farrell Memorial International	(United States) New York City, New York
Win	190-20	(United States) Gary Traub	TF 10-0	November 8-9, 2024	2024 Bill Farrell Memorial International	(United States) New York City, New York
2024 Summer Olympics 5th at 97 kg
Loss	189–20	(Iran) Amir Ali Azarpira	1–4	11 August 2024	2024 Summer Olympics	Paris, France
Loss	189–19	(Bahrain) Akhmed Tazhudinov	4–6	10 August 2024	2024 Summer Olympics	Paris, France
Win	189–18	(Cuba) Arturo Silot	Fall	10 August 2024	2024 Summer Olympics	Paris, France
Win	188–18	(China) Habila Awusayiman	9–5	10 August 2024	2024 Summer Olympics	Paris, France
2024 US Olympic Team Trials (gold) at 97 kg
Win	187-18	(United States) Isaac Trumble	4–0	April 20, 2024	2024 US Olympic Team Trials	(United States) State College, Pennsylvania
Win	186-18	(United States) Isaac Trumble	5–0	April 20, 2024	2024 US Olympic Team Trials	(United States) State College, Pennsylvania
2024 Pan American Championships (gold) at 97 kg
Win	185-18	(Cuba) Arturo Silot	10–5	February 24, 2024	2024 Pan American Continental Championships	Acapulco, Mexico
Win	184-18	(Chile) Matias Uribe	TF 11–0	February 24, 2024	2024 Pan American Continental Championships	Acapulco, Mexico
Win	183-18	(Dominican Republic) Luis Miguel Pérez	Fall	February 24, 2024	2024 Pan American Continental Championships	Acapulco, Mexico
2024 Grand Prix Zagreb Open (silver) at 97 kg
Loss	182-18	(Iran) Amir Ali Azarpira	3-6	January 10, 2024	2024 Grand Prix Zagreb Open	Zagreb, Croatia
Win	182–17	(Iran) Kamran Ghasempour	4-0	January 10, 2024	2024 Grand Prix Zagreb Open	Zagreb, Croatia
Win	181–17	(Venezuela) Cristian Sarco Colmenarez	TF 10-0	January 10, 2024	2024 Grand Prix Zagreb Open	Zagreb, Croatia
Win	180-17	(Turkey) Erhan Yaylacı	TF 10-0	January 10, 2024	2024 Grand Prix Zagreb Open	Zagreb, Croatia
Win	179-17	(China) Tuerxunbieke Muheite	TF 11-1	January 10, 2024	2024 Grand Prix Zagreb Open	Zagreb, Croatia
2023 Pan American Games (gold) at 97 kg
Win	178–17	(Cuba) Arturo Silot	TF 14–4	November 2, 2023	2023 Pan American Games	Santiago, Chile
Win	177–17	(Costa Rica) Maxwell Lacey	TF 10–0	November 2, 2023	2023 Pan American Games	Santiago, Chile
Win	176–17	(Canada) Nishan Randhawa	TF 10–0	November 2, 2023	2023 Pan American Games	Santiago, Chile
2023 World Championships (bronze) at 97 kg
Win	175–17	(Authorised Neutral Athletes) Abdulrashid Sadulaev	WO	September 19, 2023	2023 World Championships	Belgrade, Serbia
Win	174–17	(Uzbekistan) Magomed Ibragimov	10–6	September 19, 2023	2023 World Championships	Belgrade, Serbia
Loss	173–17	(Bahrain) Akhmed Tazhudinov	TF 0–11	September 18, 2023	2023 World Championships	Belgrade, Serbia
Win	173–16	(Moldova) Radu Lefter	TF 12–1	September 18, 2023	2023 World Championships	Belgrade, Serbia
Win	172–16	(Canada) Nishan Randhawa	TF 10–0	September 18, 2023	2023 World Championships	Belgrade, Serbia
2023 Pan American Championships (gold) at 97 kg
Win	171–16	(Cuba) Arturo Silot	TF 14–3	May 6, 2023	2023 Pan American Championships	Buenos Aires, Argentina
Win	170–16	(Dominican Republic) Luis Miguel Pérez	Fall	May 6, 2023	2023 Pan American Championships	Buenos Aires, Argentina
Win	169–16	(Costa Rica) Maxwell Lacey	TF 10–0	May 6, 2023	2023 Pan American Championships	Buenos Aires, Argentina
2023 Dan Kolov & Nikola Petrov (gold)
Win	168–16	(South Korea) Juhwan Seo	TF 12–1	March 5, 2023	2023 Dan Kolov & Nikola Petrov	Sofia, Bulgaria
Win	167–16	(Iran) Danyal Shariatinia	TF 14–4	March 4, 2023	2023 Dan Kolov & Nikola Petrov	Sofia, Bulgaria
Win	166–16	(Finland) Juho Joel Ruusila	TF 10–0	March 4, 2023	2023 Dan Kolov & Nikola Petrov	Sofia, Bulgaria
Win	165–16	(Ukraine) Daniil Pidlypenets	TF 10–0	March 4, 2023	2023 Dan Kolov & Nikola Petrov	Sofia, Bulgaria
2023 Zagreb Open (gold)
Win	164–16	(Iran) Amir Ali Azarpira	3–0	February 2, 2023	2023 Zagreb Open	Zagreb, Croatia
Win	163–16	(Poland) Radosław Baran	TF 10–0	February 2, 2023	2023 Zagreb Open	Zagreb, Croatia
Win	162–16	(Japan) Takashi Ishiguro	TF 12–1	February 2, 2023	2023 Zagreb Open	Zagreb, Croatia
Win	161–16	(Azerbaijan) Magomedkhan Magomedov	7-4	February 2, 2023	2023 Zagreb Open	
2022 World Cup (gold)
Win	160–16	(Iran) Kamran Ghasempour	5–0	December 11, 2022	2022 World Cup	Iowa, United States
Win	159–16	(Georgia (country)) Givi Matcharashvili	6–0	December 10, 2022	2022 World Cup	Iowa, United States
Win	158–16	(Mongolia) Ölziisaikhany Batzul	WO	December 10, 2022	2022 World Cup	Iowa, United States
2022 World Championships (gold) at 97 kg
Win	157–16	(Slovakia) Batyrbek Tsakulov	6–0	October 18, 2022	2022 World Championships	Belgrade, Serbia
Win	156–16	(Iran) Mohammad Hossein Mohammadian	4–1	October 17, 2022	2022 World Championships	Belgrade, Serbia
Win	155–16	(Azerbaijan) Magomedkhan Magomedov	TF 10–0	October 17, 2022	2022 World Championships	Belgrade, Serbia
Win	154–16	(Poland) Zbigniew Baranowski	TF 4–1	October 17, 2022	2022 World Championships	Belgrade, Serbia
2022 Zouhaier Sghaier Ranking Series (gold) at 97 kg
Win	153–16	(Kazakhstan) Mamed Ibragimov	TF 11–0	July 18, 2022	2022 Zouhaier Sghaier Ranking Series	Tunis, Tunisia
Win	152–16	(Turkey) Polat Polatçı	TF 12–1	July 18, 2022	2022 Zouhaier Sghaier Ranking Series	Tunis, Tunisia
Win	151–16	(Turkey) Burak Bilal Şahin	Fall	July 18, 2022	2022 Zouhaier Sghaier Ranking Series	Tunis, Tunisia
2022 US World Team Trials (gold) at 97 kg
Win	150–16	(United States) Kollin Moore	TF 12–2	June 3, 2022	2022 Final X: Stillwater	(United States) Stillwater, Oklahoma
Win	149–16	(United States) Kollin Moore	TF 11–0	June 3, 2022	2022 Final X: Stillwater	(United States) Stillwater, Oklahoma
2022 Pan American Championships (gold) at 97 kg
Win	148–16	(Cuba) Arturo Silot	TF 12–1	May 8, 2022	2022 Pan American Continental Championships	Acapulco, Mexico
Win	147–16	(Canada) Nishan Randhawa	TF 11–0	May 8, 2022	2022 Pan American Continental Championships	Acapulco, Mexico
Win	146–16	(Dominican Republic) Luis Miguel Pérez	TF 10–0	May 8, 2022	2022 Pan American Continental Championships	Acapulco, Mexico
RUDIS+ Super Match (gold) at 97 kg
Win	145–16	(United States) J'den Cox	7–2	March 16, 2022	RUDIS+ Super Match: Snyder vs. Cox	(United States) Detroit, Michigan
Win	144–16	(United States) J'den Cox	5–5	March 16, 2022	RUDIS+ Super Match: Snyder vs. Cox	(United States) Detroit, Michigan
Win	143–16	(Poland) Zbigniew Baranowski	TF 12–0	February 12, 2022	2022 Bout at the Ballpark	(United States) Arlington, Texas
2022 Ivan Yarygin Golden Grand Prix (gold) at 97 kg
Win	142–16	(Russia) Shamil Musaev	8–3	January 27–30, 2022	Golden Grand Prix Ivan Yarygin 2022	Krasnoyarsk, Russia
Win	141–16	(Russia) Soslan Dzhagaev	TF 14–4	January 27–30, 2022	Golden Grand Prix Ivan Yarygin 2022	Krasnoyarsk, Russia
Win	140–16	(Russia) Igor Ovsyannikov	TF 12–2	January 27–30, 2022	Golden Grand Prix Ivan Yarygin 2022	Krasnoyarsk, Russia
Win	139–16	(Russia) Devid Dzugaev	TF 11–0	January 27–30, 2022	Golden Grand Prix Ivan Yarygin 2022	Krasnoyarsk, Russia
2021 Russian International Tournament (gold) at 97 kg
Win	138–16	(Russia) Ali Aliyev	TF 18–8	December 10, 2021	2021 International in Memory of the XIX–XX Wrestlers	Khasavyurt, Russia
Win	137–16	(Russia) Shamil Musaev	TF 13–3	December 10, 2021	2021 International in Memory of the XIX–XX Wrestlers	Khasavyurt, Russia
Win	136–16	(Russia) Aslanbek Sotiev	TF 11–0	December 10, 2021	2021 International in Memory of the XIX–XX Wrestlers	Khasavyurt, Russia
Win	135–16	(Russia) Khokh Khugaev	TF 10–0	December 10, 2021	2021 International in Memory of the XIX–XX Wrestlers	Khasavyurt, Russia
2021 World Championships (silver) at 97 kg
Loss	134–16	(Russia) Abdulrashid Sadulaev	0–6	October 5, 2021	2021 World Championships	Oslo, Norway
Win	134–15	(Iran) Mojtaba Goleij	3–2	October 4, 2021	2021 World Championships	Oslo, Norway
Win	133–15	(North Macedonia) Magomedgaji Nurov	TF 11–0	October 4, 2021	2021 World Championships	Oslo, Norway
Win	132–15	(Mongolia) Ölziisaikhany Batzul	TF 14–4	October 4, 2021	2021 World Championships	Oslo, Norway
2020 Summer Olympics (silver) at 97 kg
Loss	131–15	(Russia) Abdulrashid Sadulaev	3–6	August 6–7, 2021	2020 Summer Olympics	Tokyo, Japan
Win	131–14	(Turkey) Süleyman Karadeniz	5–0	August 6–7, 2021	2020 Summer Olympics	Tokyo, Japan
Win	130–14	(Italy) Abraham Conyedo	6–0	August 6–7, 2021	2020 Summer Olympics	Tokyo, Japan
Win	129–14	(Canada) Jordan Steen	TF 12–2	August 6–7, 2021	2020 Summer Olympics	Tokyo, Japan
2021 Pan American Championships (gold) at 97 kg
Win	128–14	(Dominican Republic) Luis Miguel Pérez	TF 11–0	May 30, 2021	2021 Pan American Continental Championships	Guatemala City, Guatemala
Win	127–14	(Brazil) Marcos Carrozzino	TF 10–0	May 30, 2021	2021 Pan American Continental Championships	Guatemala City, Guatemala
Win	126–14	(Costa Rica) Maxwell Lacey	TF 10–0	May 30, 2021	2021 Pan American Continental Championships	Guatemala City, Guatemala
Win	125–14	(Colombia) Kenett Andrey Martínez Viloria	TF 12–0	May 30, 2021	2021 Pan American Continental Championships	Guatemala City, Guatemala
Win	124–14	(Canada) Richard Deschatelets	TF 10–0	May 30, 2021	2021 Pan American Continental Championships	Guatemala City, Guatemala
2020 US Olympic Team Trials (gold) at 97 kg
Win	123–14	(United States) Kollin Moore	5–1	April 3, 2021	2020 US Olympic Team Trials	(United States) Fort Worth, Texas
Win	122–14	(United States) Kollin Moore	TF 10–0	April 3, 2021	2020 US Olympic Team Trials	(United States) Fort Worth, Texas
Win	121–14	(United States) Gabe Dean	TF 13–2	February 23, 2021	NLWC V	(United States) State College, Pennsylvania
Win	120–14	(United States) Scott Boykin	TF 11–0	February 23, 2021	NLWC V	(United States) State College, Pennsylvania
Win	119–14	(United States) Nate Jackson	6–1	February 23, 2021	NLWC V	(United States) State College, Pennsylvania
2021 Henri Deglane Grand Prix (gold) at 97 kg
Win	118–14	(Moldova) Radu Lefter	TF 11–0	January 16, 2021	Grand Prix de France Henri Deglane 2021	Nice, France
Win	117–14	(Poland) Radosław Baran	9–2	January 16, 2021	Grand Prix de France Henri Deglane 2021	Nice, France
Win	116–14	(Germany) Erik Thiele	TF 11–1	January 16, 2021	Grand Prix de France Henri Deglane 2021	Nice, France
Win	115–14	(United States) Ty Walz	TF 10–0	December 22, 2020	NLWC IV	(United States) State College, Pennsylvania
2020 US Nationals 6th at 97 kg
Win	114–14	(United States) Jakob Woodley	TF 10–0	October 10–11, 2020	2020 US Senior Nationals	(United States) Coralville, Iowa
Win	113–14	(United States) William Baldwin	TF 12–0	October 10–11, 2020	2020 US Senior Nationals	(United States) Coralville, Iowa
Win	112–14	(United States) Jeremiah Casto	Fall	October 10–11, 2020	2020 US Senior Nationals	(United States) Coralville, Iowa
Win	111–14	(United States) Michael Macchiavello	TF 12–1	September 19, 2020	NLWC I	(United States) State College, Pennsylvania
2020 Pan American Championships (gold) at 97 kg
Win	110–14	(Cuba) Reineris Salas	TF 11–1	March 6–9, 2020	2020 Pan American Wrestling Championships	Ottawa, Canada
Win	109–14	(Venezuela) José Daniel Díaz	9–1	March 6–9, 2020	2020 Pan American Wrestling Championships	Ottawa, Canada
Win	108–14	(Puerto Rico) Evan Ramos	TF 12–2	March 6–9, 2020	2020 Pan American Wrestling Championships	Ottawa, Canada
Win	107–14	(Dominican Republic) Luis Miguel Pérez	TF 14–4	March 6–9, 2020	2020 Pan American Wrestling Championships	Ottawa, Canada
2020 Matteo Pellicone RS (bronze) at 97 kg
Win	106–14	(Italy) Abraham Conyedo	TF 12–1	January 15–18, 2020	2020 Matteo Pellicone Ranking Series	Rome, Italy
Loss	105–14	(Iran) Mohammad Hossein Mohammadian	Fall	January 15–18, 2020	2020 Matteo Pellicone Ranking Series	Rome, Italy
Win	105–13	(Turkey) İbrahim Bölükbaşı	12–4	January 15–18, 2020	2020 Matteo Pellicone Ranking Series	Rome, Italy
Win	104–13	(Kazakhstan) Iliskhan Chilayev	TF 10–0	January 15–18, 2020	2020 Matteo Pellicone Ranking Series	Rome, Italy
2019 World Championships (bronze) at 97 kg
Win	103–13	(Georgia (country)) Elizbar Odikadze	5–0	September 21–22, 2019	2019 World Wrestling Championships	Nur-Sultan, Kazakhstan
Loss	102–13	(Azerbaijan) Sharif Sharifov	2–5	September 21–22, 2019	2019 World Wrestling Championships	Nur-Sultan, Kazakhstan
Win	102–12	(Uzbekistan) Magomed Ibragimov	TF 13–3	September 21–22, 2019	2019 World Wrestling Championships	Nur-Sultan, Kazakhstan
Win	101–12	(India) Mausam Khatri	TF 10–0	September 21–22, 2019	2019 World Wrestling Championships	Nur-Sultan, Kazakhstan
2019 Pan American Games (gold) at 97 kg
Win	100–12	(Venezuela) José Daniel Díaz	9–3	August 10, 2019	2019 Pan American Games	Lima, Peru
Win	99–12	(Cuba) Reineris Salas	3–1	August 10, 2019	2019 Pan American Games	Lima, Peru
Win	98–12	(Puerto Rico) Evan Ramos	TF 10–0	August 10, 2019	2019 Pan American Games	Lima, Peru
2019 Yaşar Doğu (gold) at 97 kg
Win	97–12	(Iran) Ali Shabani	2–1	July 11–14, 2019	2019 Yaşar Doğu International	Istanbul, Turkey
Win	96–12	(Hungary) Pavlo Oliynyk	TF 10–0	July 11–14, 2019	2019 Yaşar Doğu International	Istanbul, Turkey
Win	95–12	(Turkey) Baki Şahin	TF 13–2	July 11–14, 2019	2019 Yaşar Doğu International	Istanbul, Turkey
2019 Final X: Lincoln (gold) at 97 kg
Win	94–12	(United States) Kyven Gadson	4–0	June 14–15, 2019	2019 US World Team Trials	(United States) Lincoln, Nebraska
Win	93–12	(United States) Kyven Gadson	TF 10–0	June 14–15, 2019	2019 US World Team Trials	(United States) Lincoln, Nebraska
Win	92–12	(Canada) Nishan Randhawa	TF 15-1	May 6, 2019	2019 Beat the Streets	(United States) New York City, New York
2019 Pan American Championships (gold) at 97 kg
Win	91–12	(Canada) Jordan Steen	TF 10–0	April 21, 2019	2019 Pan American Wrestling Championships	Buenos Aires, Argentina
Win	90–12	(Argentina) Evan Ramos	TF 11–1	April 21, 2019	2019 Pan American Wrestling Championships	Buenos Aires, Argentina
2019 Dan Kolov – Nikola Petrov (gold) at 97 kg
Win	89–12	(Ukraine) Valeriy Andriytsev	4–0	February 28 – March 3, 2019	2019 Dan Kolov – Nikola Petrov Memorial	Ruse, Bulgaria
Win	88–12	(Turkey) Baki Şahin	TF 11–0	February 28 – March 3, 2019	2019 Dan Kolov – Nikola Petrov Memorial	Ruse, Bulgaria
Win	87–12	(Ukraine) Murazi Mchedlidze	8–5	February 28 – March 3, 2019	2019 Dan Kolov – Nikola Petrov Memorial	Ruse, Bulgaria
Win	86–12	(United States) Ty Walz	TF 12–1	February 28 – March 3, 2019	2019 Dan Kolov – Nikola Petrov Memorial	Ruse, Bulgaria
2019 Golden Grand Prix Ivan Yarygin 10th at 97 kg
Loss	85–12	(Dagestan) Rasul Magomedov	5–6	January 24, 2019	2019 Ivan Yarygin Golden Grand Prix	Krasnoyarsk, Russia
2018 World Championships (silver) at 97 kg
Loss	85–11	(Russia) Abdulrashid Sadulaev	Fall	October 22–23, 2017	2018 World Wrestling Championships	Budapest, Hungary
Win	85–10	(Hungary) Pavlo Oliynyk	3–0	October 22–23, 2017	2018 World Wrestling Championships	Budapest, Hungary
Win	84–10	(Italy) Abraham Conyedo	11–2	October 22–23, 2017	2018 World Wrestling Championships	Budapest, Hungary
Win	83–10	(American Samoa) Nathaniel Tuamoheloa	TF 10–0	October 22–23, 2017	2018 World Wrestling Championships	Budapest, Hungary
Win	82–10	(Mongolia) Ölziisaikhany Batzul	8–3	October 22–23, 2017	2018 World Wrestling Championships	Budapest, Hungary
2018 Yaşar Doğu (bronze) at 97 kg
Win	81–10	(Turkey) Rıza Yıldırım	TF 11–0	July 27–29, 2018	2018 Yaşar Doğu International	Istanbul, Turkey
Loss	80–10	(Azerbaijan) Aslanbek Alborov	3-3	July 27–29, 2018	2018 Yaşar Doğu International	Istanbul, Turkey
Win	80–9	(Iran) Alireza Goodarzi	TF 10–0	July 27–29, 2018	2018 Yaşar Doğu International	Istanbul, Turkey
2018 US World Team Trials (gold) at 97 kg
Win	79–9	(United States) Kyven Gadson	10–2	June 8–9, 2018	2018 Final X: Lincoln	(United States) Lincoln, Nebraska
Win	78–9	(United States) Kyven Gadson	9–0	June 8–9, 2018	2018 Final X: Lincoln	(United States) Lincoln, Nebraska
Win	77–9	(Cuba) Reineris Salas	9–8	May 17, 2018	2018 Beat the Streets	(United States) New York City, New York
2018 World Cup (gold) at 97 kg
Win	76–9	(Azerbaijan) Roman Bakirov	TF 14–3	April 7–8, 2018	2018 Wrestling World Cup - Men's freestyle	(United States) Iowa City, Iowa
Win	75–9	(Georgia (country)) Givi Matcharashvili	TF 10–0	April 7–8, 2018	2018 Wrestling World Cup - Men's freestyle	(United States) Iowa City, Iowa
Win	74–9	(Japan) Taira Sonoda	TF 10–0	April 7–8, 2018	2018 Wrestling World Cup - Men's freestyle	(United States) Iowa City, Iowa
Win	73–9	(India) Viky Viky	TF 10–0	April 7–8, 2018	2018 Wrestling World Cup - Men's freestyle	(United States) Iowa City, Iowa
2018 Ivan Yarygin Golden Grand Prix (gold) at 97 kg
Win	72–9	(Dagestan) Ruslan Magomedov	4–1	January 28, 2018	Golden Grand Prix Ivan Yarygin 2018	Krasnoyarsk, Russia
Win	71–9	(North Ossetia–Alania) Vladislav Baitcaev	5–1	January 28, 2018	Golden Grand Prix Ivan Yarygin 2018	Krasnoyarsk, Russia
Win	70–9	(Turkey) Yunus Dede	6–2	January 28, 2018	Golden Grand Prix Ivan Yarygin 2018	Krasnoyarsk, Russia
Win	69–9	(Turkmenistan) Sohbet Belliyev	TF 10–0	January 28, 2018	Golden Grand Prix Ivan Yarygin 2018	Krasnoyarsk, Russia
2017 World Clubs Cup (silver) for TMWC at 97 kg
Win	68–9	(Russia) Vladislav Baitcaev	TF 11–0	December 7–8, 2017	2017 World Wrestling Clubs Cup - Men's freestyle	Tehran, Iran
Win	67–9	(Mongolia) Batsukh Zorigtbaatar	TF 12–2	December 7–8, 2017	2017 World Wrestling Clubs Cup - Men's freestyle	Tehran, Iran
Win	66–9	(Bulgaria) Dimitar Karaivanov	TF 10–0	December 7–8, 2017	2017 World Wrestling Clubs Cup - Men's freestyle	Tehran, Iran
Win	65–9	(India) Somveer Kadian	TF 10–0	December 7–8, 2017	2017 World Wrestling Clubs Cup - Men's freestyle	Tehran, Iran
Win	64–9	(Iran) Khajeh Salehani	9–3	December 7–8, 2017	2017 World Wrestling Clubs Cup - Men's freestyle	Tehran, Iran
2017 World Championships (gold) at 97 kg
Win	61–9	(Russia) Abdulrashid Sadulaev	6–5	August 26, 2017	2017 World Wrestling Championships	Paris, France
Win	60–9	(Azerbaijan) Aslanbek Alborov	9–2	August 26, 2017	2017 World Wrestling Championships	Paris, France
Win	59–9	(Japan) Naoya Akaguma	TF 10–0	August 26, 2017	2017 World Wrestling Championships	Paris, France
Win	58–9	(Kazakhstan) Mamed Ibragimov	TF 10–0	August 26, 2017	2017 World Wrestling Championships	Paris, France
2017 Spain Grand Prix (gold) at 97 kg
Win	57–9	(South Africa) Martin Erasmus	TF 10–0	July 15–16, 2017	2017 Grand Prix of Spain	Madrid, Spain
Win	56–9	(Iran) Hossein Shahbazigazvar	TF 10–0	July 15–16, 2017	2017 Grand Prix of Spain	Madrid, Spain
Win	55–9	(Russia) Adam Kariaev	TF 10–0	July 15–16, 2017	2017 Grand Prix of Spain	Madrid, Spain
Win	54–9	(Sweden) Sven Engström	TF 10–0	July 15–16, 2017	2017 Grand Prix of Spain	Madrid, Spain
2017 US World Team Trials (gold) at 97 kg
Win	53–9	(United States) Kyven Gadson	TF 13–2	June 9–10, 2017	2017 US World Team Trials	(United States) Lincoln, Nebraska
Win	52-9	(United States) Kyven Gadson	TF 10–0	June 9–10, 2017	2017 US World Team Trials	(United States) Lincoln, Nebraska
Win	51–9	(Japan) Koki Yamamoto	TF 10–0	May 17, 2017	2017 Beat the Streets	(United States) New York City, New York
2017 Pan American Championships (gold) at 97 kg
Win	50–9	(Dominican Republic) Luis Miguel Pérez	TF 10–0	May 5–7, 2017	2017 Pan American Wrestling Championships	Salvador, Brazil
Win	49–9	(Canada) Nishan Randhawa	TF 10–0	May 5–7, 2017	2017 Pan American Wrestling Championships	Salvador, Brazil
Win	48–9	(Brazil) Felipe Cesar Camilo de Oliveira	TF 11–0	May 5–7, 2017	2017 Pan American Wrestling Championships	Salvador, Brazil
2017 World Cup (gold) at 97 kg
Win	47–9	(Iran) Amir Mohammadi	6–0	February 16–17, 2017	2017 Wrestling World Cup – Men's freestyle	(United States) Los Angeles, California
Loss	46–9	(Azerbaijan) Aslanbek Alborov	4–5	February 16–17, 2017	2017 Wrestling World Cup – Men's freestyle	(United States) Los Angeles, California
Win	46–8	(Russia) Yuri Belonovski	11–2	February 16–17, 2017	2017 Wrestling World Cup – Men's freestyle	(United States) Los Angeles, California
Win	45–8	(Georgia (country)) Zviadi Metreveli	TF 11–0	February 16–17, 2017	2017 Wrestling World Cup – Men's freestyle	(United States) Los Angeles, California
2017 Ivan Yarygin Golden Grand Prix (gold) at 97 kg
Win	44–8	(Dagestan) Ruslan Magomedov	Fall	January 27–29, 2017	Golden Grand Prix Ivan Yarygin 2017	Krasnoyarsk, Russia
Win	43–8	(Iran) Hossein Ramezanian	TF 11–1	January 27–29, 2017	Golden Grand Prix Ivan Yarygin 2017	Krasnoyarsk, Russia
Win	42–8	(Mongolia) Munkhzhargal Belgutei	TF 11–1	January 27–29, 2017	Golden Grand Prix Ivan Yarygin 2017	Krasnoyarsk, Russia
Win	41–8	(China) Chaganhzana	TF 11–0	January 27–29, 2017	Golden Grand Prix Ivan Yarygin 2017	Krasnoyarsk, Russia
2016 World Clubs Cup (gold) as TMWC at 97 kg
Loss	40–8	(Iran) Abbas Tahan	1-3	November 30 - December 1, 2016	2016 World Wrestling Clubs Cup	Kharkiv, Ukraine
Win	40–7	(Ukraine) Murazi Mchedlidze	6–3	November 30 - December 1, 2016	2016 World Wrestling Clubs Cup	Kharkiv, Ukraine
Loss	39–7	(Georgia (country)) Elizbar Odikadze	2–2	November 30 - December 1, 2016	2016 World Wrestling Clubs Cup	Kharkiv, Ukraine
Win	39–6	(Ukraine) Andriy Vlasov	Fall	November 30 - December 1, 2016	2016 World Wrestling Clubs Cup	Kharkiv, Ukraine
2016 Summer Olympics (gold) at 97 kg
Win	38–6	(Azerbaijan) Khetag Gazyumov	2–1	August 21, 2016	2016 Summer Olympics	Rio de Janeiro, Brazil
Win	37–6	(Georgia (country)) Elizbar Odikadze	9–4	August 21, 2016	2016 Summer Olympics	Rio de Janeiro, Brazil
Win	36–6	(Romania) Albert Saritov	7–0	August 21, 2016	2016 Summer Olympics	Rio de Janeiro, Brazil
Win	35–6	(Cuba) Javier Cortina	10–3	August 21, 2016	2016 Summer Olympics	Rio de Janeiro, Brazil
2016 Germany Grand Prix (bronze) at 97 kg
Win	34–6	(Turkey) Serdar Böke	Fall	July 2–3, 2016	2016 Grand Prix of Germany	Dortmund, Germany
Loss	33–6	(Azerbaijan) Khetag Gazyumov	1–2	July 2–3, 2016	2016 Grand Prix of Germany	Dortmund, Germany
Win	33–5	(Venezuela) José Daniel Díaz	9–1	July 2–3, 2016	2016 Grand Prix of Germany	Dortmund, Germany
Win	32–5	(Moldova) Nicolai Ceban	9–4	July 2–3, 2016	2016 Grand Prix of Germany	Dortmund, Germany
2016 World Cup (gold) at 97 kg
Win	31–5	(Georgia (country)) Elizbar Odikadze	3–3	June 11–12, 2016	2016 Wrestling World Cup – Men's freestyle	(United States) Los Angeles, California
Win	30–5	(Azerbaijan) Aslanbek Alborov	2–1	June 11–12, 2016	2016 Wrestling World Cup – Men's freestyle	(United States) Los Angeles, California
Win	29–5	(Iran) Abbas Tahan	8–1	June 11–12, 2016	2016 Wrestling World Cup – Men's freestyle	(United States) Los Angeles, California
Win	28–5	(India) Satyawart Kadian	TF 10–0	June 11–12, 2016	2016 Wrestling World Cup – Men's freestyle	(United States) Los Angeles, California
2016 US Olympic Team Trials (gold) at 97 kg
Win	27–5	(United States) Jake Varner	6–1	April 8–10, 2016	2016 US Olympic Team Trials	(United States) Iowa City, Iowa
Win	26–5	(United States) Jake Varner	4–0	April 8–10, 2016	2016 US Olympic Team Trials	(United States) Iowa City, Iowa
Loss	25–5	(United States) Jake Varner	4–4	April 8–10, 2016	2016 US Olympic Team Trials	(United States) Iowa City, Iowa
2016 Alexandr Medved Prizes (bronze) at 97 kg
Win	25–4	(Germany) Erik Thiele	3–0	February 18–19, 2016	2016 Alexandr Medved Prizes	Minsk, Belarus
Loss	24–4	(Russia) Khadzhimurat Gatsalov	2–5	February 18–19, 2016	2016 Alexandr Medved Prizes	Minsk, Belarus
Win	24–3	(Russia) Yury Belonovskiy	5–1	February 18–19, 2016	2016 Alexandr Medved Prizes	Minsk, Belarus
Win	23–3	(Uzbekistan) Magomed Ibragimov	7–0	February 18–19, 2016	2016 Alexandr Medved Prizes	Minsk, Belarus
2016 Ivan Yarygin Golden Grand Prix (bronze) at 97 kg
Win	22–3	(Dagestan) Zaynula Kurbanov	8–2	January 27–29, 2016	Golden Grand Prix Ivan Yarygin 2016	Krasnoyarsk, Russia
Loss	21–3	(Chechnya) Anzor Boltukaev	0–3	January 27–29, 2016	Golden Grand Prix Ivan Yarygin 2016	Krasnoyarsk, Russia
Win	21–2	(Russia) Tornike Kvitatiani	INJ (4–0)	January 27–29, 2016	Golden Grand Prix Ivan Yarygin 2016	Krasnoyarsk, Russia
Win	20–2	(Russia) Georgi Dzukaev	TF 10–0	January 27–29, 2016	Golden Grand Prix Ivan Yarygin 2016	Krasnoyarsk, Russia
2015 Brazil Cup (gold) at 97 kg
Win	19–2	(Brazil) Paulo Victor	TF 10–0	December 11–12, 2015	2015 Brazil Cup	Contagem, Brazil
Win	18–2	(Brazil) Robson Kato	TF 10–0	December 11–12, 2015	2015 Brazil Cup	Contagem, Brazil
2015 World Championships (gold) at 97 kg
Win	17–2	(Russia) Abdusalam Gadisov	5–5	September 11, 2015	2015 World Wrestling Championships	(United States) Las Vegas, Nevada
Win	16–2	(Iran) Abbas Tahan	6–3	September 11, 2015	2015 World Wrestling Championships	(United States) Las Vegas, Nevada
Win	15–2	(Venezuela) José Daniel Díaz	TF 11–1	September 11, 2015	2015 World Wrestling Championships	(United States) Las Vegas, Nevada
Win	14–2	(Poland) Radosław Baran	8–0	September 11, 2015	2015 World Wrestling Championships	(United States) Las Vegas, Nevada
Win	13–2	(Ukraine) Pavlo Oliynyk	2–1	September 11, 2015	2015 World Wrestling Championships	(United States) Las Vegas, Nevada
2015 Pan American Games (gold) at 97 kg
Win	12–2	(Canada) Arjun Gill	TF 12–2	July 18, 2015	2015 Pan American Games	Toronto, Canada
Win	11–2	(Venezuela) José Daniel Díaz	TF 10–0	July 18, 2015	2015 Pan American Games	Toronto, Canada
Win	10–2	(Argentina) Yuri Maier	TF 11–1	July 18, 2015	2015 Pan American Games	Toronto, Canada
2015 US World Team Trials (gold) at 97 kg
Win	9–2	(United States) Jake Varner	3–0	June 12–14, 2015	2015 US World Team Trials	(United States) Madison, Wisconsin
Win	8–2	(United States) Jake Varner	4–1	June 12–14, 2015	2015 US World Team Trials	(United States) Madison, Wisconsin
Win	7–2	(Cuba) Javier Cortina	4–0	May 21, 2015	2015 Beat the Streets	(United States) New York City, New York
2015 US Senior Nationals (gold) at 97 kg
Win	6–2	(United States) Jake Varner	2–1	May 7–9, 2015	2015 US Senior National Championships	(United States) Las Vegas, Nevada
Win	5–2	(United States) J'den Cox	4–3	May 7–9, 2015	2015 US Senior National Championships	(United States) Las Vegas, Nevada
Win	4–2	(United States) Dustin Kilgore	TF 13–3	May 7–9, 2015	2015 US Senior National Championships	(United States) Las Vegas, Nevada
Win	3–2	(United States) Romero Cotton	TF 10–0	May 7–9, 2015	2015 US Senior National Championships	(United States) Las Vegas, Nevada
Loss	2–2	(Russia) Khadzhimurat Gatsalov	3–6	May 8, 2014	2014 Beat the Streets	(United States) New York City, New York
2013 Henri Deglane Grand Prix (bronze) at 96 kg
Win	2–1	(Georgia (country)) Nodar Kurtanidze	7–0	November 29, 2013	2013 Grand Prix de France Henri Deglane	Nice, France
Win	1–1	(France) Jeremy Latour	7–0	November 29, 2013	2013 Grand Prix de France Henri Deglane	Nice, France
Loss	0–1	(United Kingdom) Leon Rattigan	3–3	November 29, 2013	2013 Grand Prix de France Henri Deglane	Nice, France

=== High school and junior ===
Snyder amassed a 179–0 record in his first three years of high school before becoming the youngest American in over 20 years to win a FILA Junior World Championship in August 2013. Snyder was coached by two former World Champions during his gold medal match: Bill Zadick of the Iowa Hawkeyes, who was a college teammate of Jeff McGinness, the youngest ever American FILA Junior World Champion who won the tournament in 1992, as well as Zeke Jones. Although Snyder did not repeat his gold-medal run in 2014, he brought home a bronze medal and became the youngest two-time junior world medalist in American history.

Before bringing home his junior world title in 2013, Snyder had already decided to forgo his senior year of high-school competition and instead compete internationally as a resident athlete at the United States Olympic Training Center beginning in fall 2013. In the spring of 2014, at 18 years of age, Snyder was selected to represent Team USA as the youngest-ever member of the Beat the Streets All-Star team that faced off against top-ranked wrestlers from across the world, where he wrestled alongside fellow Americans with multiple NCAA championships and Olympic gold medals such as David Taylor, Brent Metcalf and Jordan Burroughs. Snyder, who competes internationally at 96 kg, lost a tightly contested exhibition match 6–3 against Khadzhimurat Gatsalov, the No. 1-ranked wrestler in the world at 120 kg who at 31 years old had won five World Championships and an Olympic gold medal. A few weeks later, Snyder secured a place on his second consecutive United States Junior World Team, winning by technical fall in the national finals.

Snyder hoped to repeat his championship run at the Junior World Championships in 2014, though fell short and lost to Georgy Gogaev of Russia from North Ossetia-Alania in the quarterfinals, and wrestled back for a bronze. Earlier in 2014, Gogaev had defeated two former Division I (NCAA) champions Dustin Kilgore and Cam Simaz, both of whom had won their NCAA titles years earlier, in 2011 and 2012 respectively – while Snyder was still competing in high school.

==== Junior record ====
Junior matches
Res.	Record	Opponent	Score	Date	Event	Location
2014 Junior World (bronze) at 96 kg
Win	8–1	(Iran) Hamidreza Jamshidi	7–1	August 8, 2014	Junior World Championship	(Croatia) Zagreb
Win	7–1	(Bulgaria) Angel Gochev	Tech Fall	August 8, 2014	Junior World Championship	(Croatia) Zagreb
Loss	6–1	(Russia) Georgi Gogaev	1–8	August 8, 2014	Junior World Championship	(Croatia) Zagreb
Win	6–0	(Azerbaijan) Said Gamidov	8–2	August 8, 2014	Junior World Championship	(Croatia) Zagreb
Win	5–0	(Cyprus) Alxios Kaouslidis	Tech Fall	August 8, 2014	Junior World Championship	(Croatia) Zagreb
2013 Junior World (gold) at 96 kg
Win	4–0	(Armenia) Viktor Kazishvili	11–4	August 17, 2013	Junior World Championship	(Bulgaria) Sofia
Win	3–0	(Germany) Robin Ferdinand	8–0	August 17, 2013	Junior World Championship	(Bulgaria) Sofia
Win	2–0	(Russia) Yasup Malachmagomedov	3–1	August 17, 2013	Junior World Championship	(Bulgaria) Sofia
Win	1–0	(Moldova) Radu Balaur	4–1	August 17, 2013	Junior World Championship	(Bulgaria) Sofia

=== Olympic, collegiate, and senior ===
Snyder, just 19 years old at the time, defeated the reigning World Champion at 97 kg, Russia's Abdusalam Gadisov, for his 2015 World Championship in Las Vegas. And then less than one year later, Snyder bested Azerbaijan's Khetag Gazyumov, a former World Champion and two-time Olympic medalist, for his Rio Olympic gold. Additionally, to earn the honor of representing the United States of America on each of those national teams, Snyder had to beat reigning London 2012 Olympic gold medalist Jake Varner in both America's 2015 World Team Trials and the 2016 Olympic Team Trials. Since USA Wrestling's National Team Trials use a best two-out-of-three format for their finals, Snyder had to beat the returning Olympic gold medalist a total of four times, which he did with a cumulative score of 21–6 over the course of their matches.

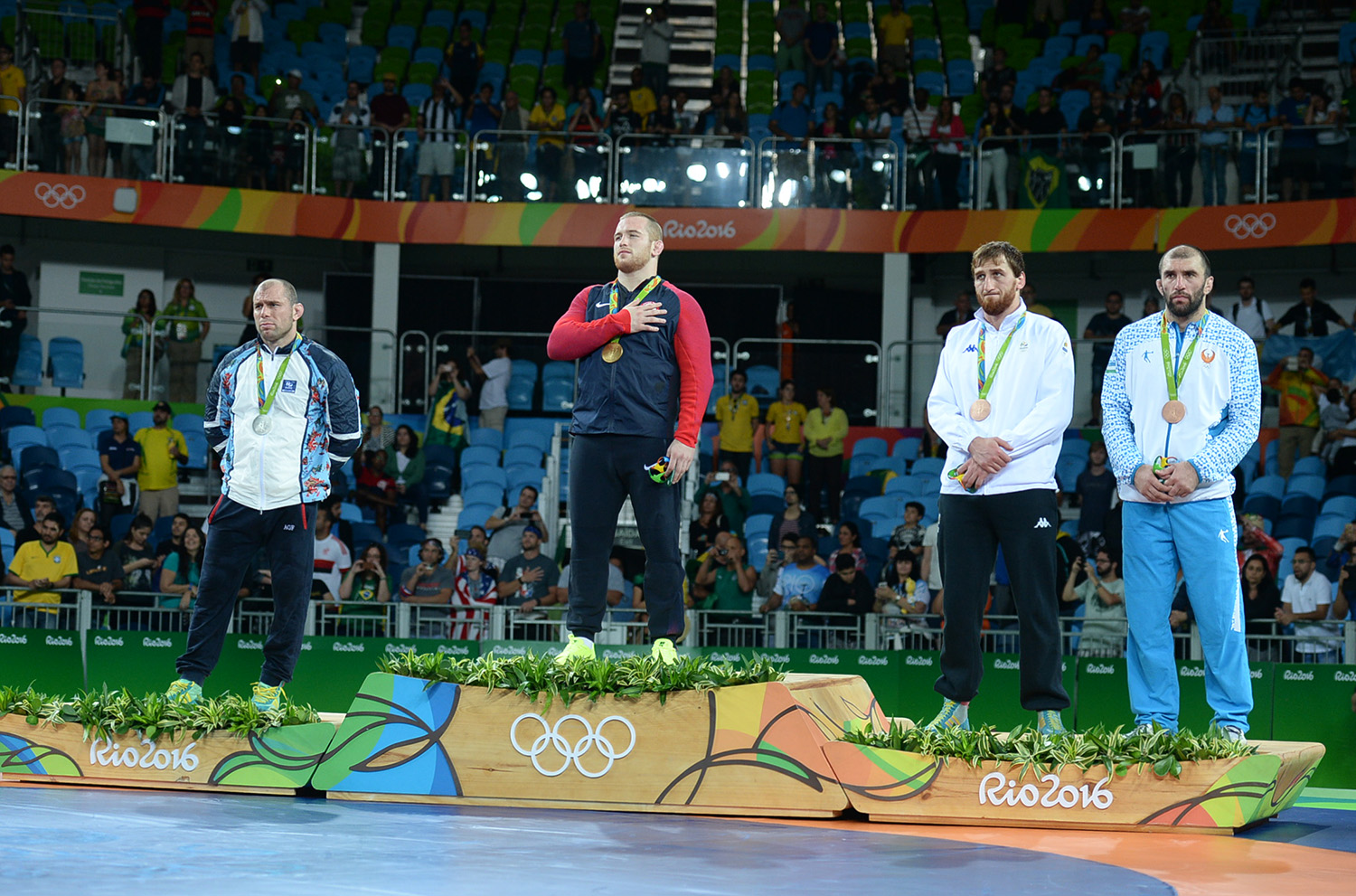
2016 Summer Olympics, Men's Freestyle Wrestling 97 kg awarding ceremony

Snyder, who wrestled collegiately for the Ohio State Buckeyes, is also a three-time NCAA Division I National Champion. His first was won with an overtime victory in a sold-out Madison Square Garden which snapped his opponent's 88-match winning streak, preventing North Carolina State University's Nick Gwiazdowski from winning his third consecutive NCAA heavyweight title. Weighing in for the 285 lb. Heavyweight division at just 226 pounds, Snyder was the lightest heavyweight in the field and was named Most Outstanding Wrestler of the tournament.

For his two international championships Snyder was rewarded with over a quarter million dollars by the Living the Dream Medal Fund, which was founded by "two former collegiate wrestlers-turned Wall Street tycoons," billionaire investment banker Michael E. Novogratz and real estate developer David Barry. Snyder was well endowed with $250,000 for his 2016 Summer Olympics gold and earlier received $50,000 for his 2015 World Championship, money he is allowed to keep since the NCAA made an exception to its rules against student-athlete financial compensation for the Fund.

==== NCAA record ====
NCAA record
Res.	Record	Opponent	Score	Date	Event
NCAA (gold) at 285 lbs
Win	75–5	Adam Coon	3–2	March 15, 2018	NCAA Championships
Win	74–5	Jacob Kasper	10–5	March 15, 2018	NCAA Championships
Win	73–5	Derek White	6–3	March 15, 2018	NCAA Championships
Win	72–5	Jere Heino	Tech Fall	March 15, 2018	NCAA Championships
Win	71–5	Ryan Solomon	15–5	March 15, 2018	NCAA Championships
Big Ten (gold) at 285 lbs
Win	70–5	Adam Coon	4–2	Mar 3, 2018	Big Ten Championships
Win	69–5	Nick Nevills	14–5	Mar 3, 2018	Big Ten Championships
Win	68–5	Shawn Streck	17–6	Mar 3, 2018	Big Ten Championships
Win	67–5	Fletcher Miller	Tech Fall	Mar 3, 2018	Big Ten Championships
Win	66–5	Michael Boykin	Tech Fall	Feb 18, 2018	Ohio State – North Carolina Dual
Loss	65–5	Adam Coon	1–3	Feb 11, 2018	Ohio State – Michigan Dual
Win	65–4	Nick Nevills	15–10	Feb 3, 2018	Ohio State – Penn State Dual
Win	64–4	Steven Holloway	Tech Fall	Jan 21, 2018	Iowa – Ohio State Dual
Win	63–4	Rylee Streifel	Tech Fall	Jan 12, 2018	Minnesota – Ohio State Dual
Win	62–4	Razohnn Gross	Fall	Jan 7, 2018	Ohio State – Rutgers Dual
Win	61–4	Stacey Ben	Fall	Dec 17, 2017	Ohio State – Chattanooga Dual
Win	60–4	Devin Nye	Fall	Nov 21, 2017	Kent State – Ohio State Dual
Win	59–4	Austin Harris	Fall	Nov 12, 2017	Arizona State – Ohio State Dual
NCAA (gold) at 285 lbs
Win	58–4	Conor Medbery	6–3	Mar 16, 2017	NCAA Championships
Win	57–4	Jacob Kasper	19–6	Mar 16, 2017	NCAA Championships
Win	56–4	Michael Kroells	13–7	Mar 16, 2017	NCAA Championships
Win	55–4	Ryan Garrett	Tech Fall	Mar 16, 2017	NCAA Championships
Win	54–4	Jake Gunning	Tech Fall	Mar 16, 2017	NCAA Championships
Big Ten (gold) at 285 lbs
Win	53–4	Connor Medbery	8–5	Mar 4, 2017	Big Ten Championship
Win	52–4	Michael Kroells	14–7	Mar 4, 2017	Big Ten Championship
Win	51–4	Razohnn Gross	Tech Fall	Mar 4, 2017	Big Ten Championship
Win	50–4	Colin Jensen	16–6	Feb 10, 2017	Ohio State – Nebraska Dual
Win	49–4	Razohnn Gross	Tech Fall	Feb 6, 2017	Rutgers – Ohio State Dual
Win	48–4	Nick Nevills	19–9	Feb 3, 2017	Penn State – Ohio State Dual
Win	47–4	Hemida Youssef	Tech Fall	Jan 22, 2017	Maryland – Ohio State Dual
Win	46–4	Deuce Rachal	Fall	Jan 15, 2017	Illinois – Ohio State Dual
Win	45–4	Austin Myers	Fall	Dec 8, 2016	Missouri – Ohio State Dual
Win	44–4	Devin Nye	Fall	Nov 22, 2016	Ohio State – Kent State Dual
Win	43–4	Michael Furbee	Fall	Nov 22, 2016	Ohio State – Cleveland State Dual
Win	42–4	Tanner Hall	20–18	Nov 19, 2016	Ohio State – Arizona State Dual
NCAA (gold) at 285 lbs
Win	41–4	Nick Gwiazdowski	7–5	Mar 17, 2016	NCAA Championship
Win	40–4	Ty Walz	10–6	Mar 17, 2016	NCAA Championship
Win	39–4	Amarveer Dhesi	16–5	Mar 17, 2016	NCAA Championship
Win	38–4	Tanner Harms	Tech Fall	Mar 17, 2016	NCAA Championship
Win	37–4	Antonio Pelusi	Fall	Mar 17, 2016	NCAA Championship
Big Ten (gold) at 285 lbs
Win	36–4	Adam Coon	7–4	Mar 5, 2016	Big Ten Championship
Win	35–4	Collin Jensen	Tech Fall	Mar 5, 2016	Big Ten Championship
Win	34–4	Brooks Black	Tech Fall	Mar 5, 2016	Big Ten Championship
Win	33–4	Brock Horwath	Tech Fall	Feb 12, 2016	Wisconsin – Ohio State Dual
Win	32–4	Jan Johnson	Tech Fall	Feb 5, 2016	Ohio State – Penn State Dual
Win	31–4	Collin Jensen	20–9	Jan 17, 2016	Nebraska – Ohio State Dual
Loss	30–4	Kyven Gadson	Fall	Mar 19, 2015	NCAA Championships
Win	30–3	J'den Cox	3–2	Mar 19, 2015	NCAA Championships
Win	29–3	Scott Schiller	3–2	Mar 19, 2015	NCAA Championships
Win	28–3	Shane Woods	14–5	Mar 19, 2015	NCAA Championships
Win	27–3	Braden Atwood	12–4	Mar 19, 2015	NCAA Championships
Loss	26–3	Morgan McIntosh	1–4	Mar 7, 2015	Big Ten Championships
Win	26–2	Nathan Burak	3–2	Mar 7, 2015	Big Ten Championships
Win	25–2	Timmy McCall	6–2	Mar 7, 2015	Big Ten Championships
Win	24–2	Elliot Riddick	9–1	Feb 21, 2015	Ohio State – Lehigh Dual
Win	23–2	Vince Pickett	Tech Fall	Feb 15, 2015	Ohio State – Edinboro Dual
Win	22–2	Scott Schiller	3–1	Feb 6, 2015	Minnesota – Ohio State Dual
Win	21–2	Hayden Hrymack	Tech Fall	Feb 1, 2015	Ohio State – Rutgers Dual
Win	20–2	Tanner Lynde	18–7	Jan 30, 2015	Purdue – Ohio State Dual
Win	19–2	Rob Fitzgerals	19–9	Jan 25, 2015	Ohio State – Maryland Dual
Win	18–2	Luke Sheridan	18–7	Jan 23, 2015	Indiana – Ohio State Dual
Win	17–2	Max Hunyley	5–2	Jan 18, 2015	Ohio State – Michigan Dual
Win	16–2	Nick McDiarmid	17–6	Jan 16, 2015	Ohio State – Michigan State Dual
Win	15–2	Morgan McIntosh	6–1	Jan 11, 2015	Penn State – Ohio State Dual
Loss	14–2	Nathan Burak	1–2	Jan 4, 2015	Iowa – Ohio State Dual
Win	14–1	Johnny Eblen	15–5	Dec 14, 2014	Missouri – Ohio State Dual
Win	13–1	Jace Bennett	18–7	Dec 5, 2014	Cliff Keen Las Vegas Invitational
Win	12–1	Trent Noon	16–6	Dec 5, 2014	Cliff Keen Las Vegas Invitational
Loss	11–1	Kyven Gadson	2–3	Dec 5, 2014	Cliff Keen Las Vegas Invitational
Win	11–0	Lucas Sheridan	14–4	Dec 5, 2014	Cliff Keen Las Vegas Invitational
Win	10–0	Micah Barnes	14–4	Dec 5, 2014	Cliff Keen Las Vegas Invitational
Win	9–0	Josh Popple	13–7	Dec 5, 2014	Cliff Keen Las Vegas Invitational
Win	8–0	Chance McClure	20–6	Nov 24, 2014	Ohio State – Virginia Dual
Win	7–0	Jared Haught	8–5	Nov 23, 2014	Ohio State – Virginia Tech Dual
Win	6–0	Josh DaSilveira	21–8	Nov 15, 2014	Arizona State – Ohio State Dual
Win	5–0	Cole Baxter	11–6	Nov 13, 2014	Kent State – Ohio State Dual
Win	4–0	Max Huntley	10–5	Nov 2, 2014	Michigan State Open
Win	3–0	Phil Wellington	11–4	Nov 2, 2014	Michigan State Open
Win	2–0	Nick McDiarmid	8–2	Nov 2, 2014	Michigan State Open
Win	1–0	Jake Smith	21–7	Nov 2, 2014	Michigan State Open

==== NCAA stats ====
Season	Year	School	Rank	Weigh class	Record	Win	Bonus
2018	Senior	Ohio State	#1	285	17–1	94.44%	76.92%
2017	Junior	Ohio State	#1	285	17–0	100.00%	76.47%
2016	Sophomore	Ohio State	#1	285	11–0	100.00%	72.73%
2015	Freshman	Ohio State	#3	197	30–4	88.24%	50.00%
Career					75–5	93.75%	64.00%

=== Highlights ===
In the early minutes of his gold medal Junior World Championships match in 2013, Snyder was thrown to his back by his Armenian opponent, Viktor Kazishvili, and nearly pinned. After fighting off his back and down 4–1, Snyder then ran off 10 unanswered points to secure the victory by technical fall in four minutes and four seconds, his third in his four matches at the tournament.

During his 179–0 run during his first three years of high school, Snyder only gave up a single takedown. Snyder, who stopped playing football for his nationally ranked high school team following his sophomore season, is a two-time Washington Post All-Met Wrestler of the Year, and was named the male 2013 ASICS Wrestler of the Year as well as Intermat's 2013 Wrestler of the Year. In November 2013, Snyder became the #1 ranked "Pound for pound" (P4P) American high school wrestler according to Flowrestling.org.

Undefeated in what are considered the top 3 toughest high school wrestling tournaments in America, Snyder won the Walsh Ironman twice, Beast of the East three times, and the Powerade Wrestling Tournament once. Snyder began wrestling for the Ohio State Buckeyes in 2014, placing second in the NCAA championships his freshman year at the 197-pound class individually, and winning a National Championship as part of the Buckeyes' 2014–15 team.

He initially planned to take an Olympic redshirt for the 2015–16 season, but instead chose to return for the Buckeyes and enroll in classes for the spring semester. At the NCAA championships, Snyder won at heavyweight, defeating two-time defending national champion Nick Gwiazdowski of North Carolina State University in overtime 7–5. Snyder was the lightest heavyweight in the field at 226 pounds and finished 11–0 on the season.

Snyder is a 2015 UWW world champion at age 19.

At the 2016 Summer Olympics, he won the Gold Medal bout 2–1 en route to becoming the youngest Olympic Wrestling Champion in USA history at the age of 20, beating Henry Cejudo's record.

Snyder had expressed interest in mixed martial arts, but later backtracked saying, "I don't think it's even down the road. I don't think that I'm going to fight. I think I'm going to wrestle as long as I can as long as [God] wants me to. We'll see what happens after that. I don't foresee it being fighting."

=== Awards and honors ===
2022

- (gold) Pan American Championship 97 kg

2021

- (silver) 2020 Summer Olympics 97 kg

2019

- (bronze) World Championship 97 kg
- (gold) Pan American Games 97 kg
- (gold) Yaşar Doğu 97 kg
- (gold) Pan American Championship 97 kg
- (gold) Dan Kolov Grand Prix 97 kg

2018

- (silver) World Championship 97 kg
- (bronze) Yaşar Doğu 97 kg
- (gold) NCAA Division I 285 lbs
- (gold) Big Ten Conference 285 lbs
- (gold) Ivan Yarygin Grand Prix 97 kg

2017

- (gold) World Championship 97 kg
- (gold) Ivan Yarygin 97 kg
- (gold) Pan American Championships 97 kg
- (gold) NCAA Division I 285 lbs
- (gold) Big Ten Conference 285 lbs
- Ohio State University Male Athlete of the Year
- James E. Sullivan Award Winner

2016

- (gold) 2016 Summer Olympics 97 kg
- (gold) NCAA Division I 285 lbs
- (gold) Big Ten Conference 285 lbs
- Most Outstanding Wrestler NCAA Division I championships
- Ohio State University Male Athlete of the Year

2015

- USA Freestyle Wrestler of the Year
- (gold) World Championship world 97 kg
- (gold) Pan American Games 97 kg
- (silver) NCAA Division I 197 lbs
- (silver) Big Ten Conference 197 lbs
- (gold) NCAA Division I (team championship as a member of the Buckeyes)

2014

- (bronze) UWW junior world 96 kg

2013

- ASICS High School Wrestler of the Year
- (gold) UWW junior world 96 kg
- (gold) Maryland State Division I 220 lbs

2012

- (bronze) Junior Nationals 96 kg
- (gold) Junior Nationals (Greco Roman) 96 kg
- (gold) Maryland State Division I 220 lbs

2011

- (gold) Cadet World 96 kg
- (gold) Cadet World (Greco Roman) 96 kg
- (gold) Maryland State Division I 215 lbs

== Personal life ==
Kyle Snyder is married to former Syracuse soccer player Maddie Pack Snyder. Snyder is a Christian.

In May 2018, President Donald Trump appointed Snyder to be a member of his Council on Sports, Fitness & Nutrition.

== Legal issues ==
On May 9, 2025, Snyder was arrested at a hotel as part of a prostitution sting operation in Columbus, Ohio. He was released from custody the same day, and had a court appearance set for May 19, 2025. Snyder pleaded guilty to a reduced charge of disorderly conduct after completing a john school class, and was issued a $250 fine.
