= Golden Grand Prix Ivan Yarygin 2018 – Men's freestyle 97 kg =

The men's freestyle 97 kg is a competition featured at the Golden Grand Prix Ivan Yarygin 2018, and was held in Krasnoyarsk, Russia, on 28 January.

== Medalists ==
Gold
Silver
Bronze

== Results ==
Legend

- F — Won by fall

=== Final ===
Final
(Dagestan) Rasul Magomedov	1
(United States) Kyle Snyder	4

=== Top half ===
- qualification: Rasul Magomedov def. Magomed Magomedov of Dagestan (10–2)
- qualification: Shamil Musaev of Dagestan vs. Igor Ovsyannikov of Krasnoyarsk Krai def. (2–4)

==== Section 1 ====
Qualification
(Dagestan) Rasul Magomedov	6
(Uzbekistan) Magomed Ibragimov	0
(Georgia (country)) Givi Matcharashvili	5
(Krasnoyarsk Krai) Igor Ovsyannikov	6
(North Ossetia–Alania) Vladislav Baitcaev	10
(China) Chaoqiang Yang	0
(Tajikistan) Rustam Iskandarov	4
(Turkey) Yunus Dede	15
(United States) Kyle Snyder	10
(Turkmenistan) Sohbet Belliyev	0

Round of 8
(Turkey) Ibrahim Ciftci	2
(Mongolia) Batzul Ulziisaikhan	5
(United States) Nathan Burak	0
(Dagestan) Rasul Magomedov	8
(Krasnoyarsk Krai) Igor Ovsyannikov	2
(North Ossetia–Alania) Vladislav Baitcaev	6
(Turkey) Yunus Dede	2
(United States) Kyle Snyder	6

Semifinals
(Mongolia) Batzul Ulziisaikhan	1
(Dagestan) Rasul Magomedov	12
(North Ossetia–Alania) Vladislav Baitcaev	1
(United States) Kyle Snyder	5

Final
-
-

== Repechage ==
Repechage round 1
-
-
-
-

Repechage round 2
(Uzbekistan) Magomed Ibragimov	4
(United States) Nathan Burak	0
(Turkmenistan) Sohbet Belliyev	1
(Turkey) Yunus Dede	12

Bronze medals
(Uzbekistan) Magomed Ibragimov	10
(Mongolia) Batzul Ulziisaikhan	0
(Turkey) Yunus Dede	0
(North Ossetia–Alania) Vladislav Baitcaev	11
