= Wrestling at the 2015 Pan American Games – Men's freestyle 97 kg =

Men's Freestyle 97 kg at the 2015 Pan American Games
- Venue: Mississauga Sports Centre
- Dates: July 18
- Competitors: 8 from 8 nations

Medalists
Gold medal	Kyle Snyder	United States
Silver medal	Arjun Gill	Canada
Bronze medal	José Daniel Díaz	Venezuela
Bronze medal	Jesse Ruiz	Mexico

The men's freestyle 97 kg competition of the Wrestling events at the 2015 Pan American Games in Toronto were held on July 18 at the Mississauga Sports Centre.

== Schedule ==
All times are Eastern Daylight Time (UTC-4).

Date	Time	Round
July 18, 2015	14:44	Quarterfinals
July 18, 2015	16:41	Semifinals
July 18, 2015	21:03	Bronze medal matches
July 18, 2015	21:21	Final

== Results ==
Legend

- R — Retired

=== Final ===
Quarterfinals		Semifinals		Finals
José Daniel Díaz (VEN)	7
Javier Cortina (CUB)	4	José Daniel Díaz (VEN)	0
Yuri Maier (ARG)	1	Kyle Snyder (USA)	10
Kyle Snyder (USA)	11			Kyle Snyder (USA)	10
Jesse Ruíz (MEX)	0			Arjun Gill (CAN)	0
Arjun Gill (CAN)	10	Arjun Gill (CAN)	6
Marcos Santos (PUR)	0	Marcos Santos (PUR)	1
Jarlys Mosquera (COL)	0^{R}

=== Repechage ===
Bronze medal match
Yuri Maier (ARG)	0
José Daniel Díaz (VEN)	9
Jesse Ruíz (MEX)	4
Marcos Santos (PUR)	1
