= Beast of the East (wrestling) =

American high school wrestling tournament

The Beast of the East is an American high school folkstyle wrestling tournament which has taken place since 1993. Since 1997, the tournament has been held at the University of Delaware's Bob Carpenter Center.

It is widely considered one of the top three in-season high school wrestling tournaments in the United States, along with the Walsh Jesuit Ironman and the Powerade Wrestling Tournament. Beast of the East champions have gone on to win collegiate and Olympic championships. Past champions include Kyle Snyder, David Taylor, Jordan Oliver, Franklin Gomez, Lance Palmer, and Ed Ruth.
