= Powerade Wrestling Tournament =

US high school folkstyle wrestling tournament

The Powerade Wrestling Tournament is an American high school folkstyle wrestling tournament.

It is widely considered one of the top three in-season high school wrestling tournaments in the United States, along with the Beast of the East and the Walsh Jesuit Ironman.
