= Arjun Gill =

Canadian wrestler (born 1991)

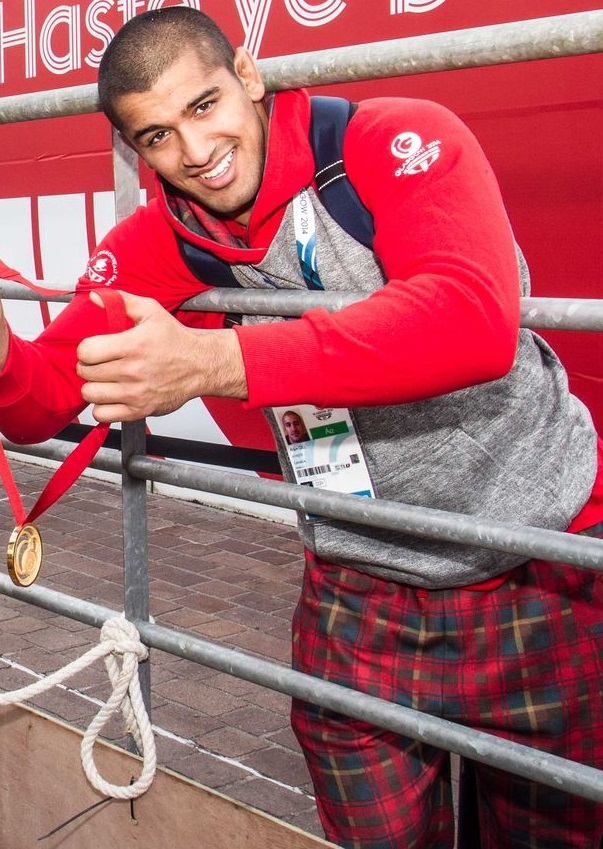
- Arjun Gill (with a buzz cut), holding his gold medal he won at the 2014 Commonwealth Games

Personal information
- Nationality: Canadian
- Born: 6 November 1991 (age 34) Quesnel, British Columbia, Canada
- Height: 1.87 m (6 ft 2 in)
- Weight: 89 kg (196 lb)

Sport
- Sport: Wrestling
- Club: Simon Fraser University
Medal record
Wrestling
Pan American Games
Silver medal – second place	2015 Toronto	97 kg freestyle
Commonwealth Games
Gold medal – first place	2014 Glasgow	97 kg freestyle

Arjun Gill (born November 6, 1991) is a wrestler competing for Canada. He won a gold medal in the 97 kg freestyle at the 2014 Commonwealth Games in Glasgow. The following year on home soil, Gill won silver at the 2015 Pan American Games in Toronto.
