= Intermat =

- Frequency: Every 3 years
- Locations: Parc des Expositions de Villepinte, Paris France
- Inaugurated: 1988
- Previous event: 2024
- Next event: 2027
- Participants: 1 500 exhibitors (70% international)
- Attendance: 183 000 visitors
- Organiser: Comexposium

INTERMAT (formerly EXPOMAT) is an international exhibition of equipment, machinery and techniques for the construction and materials industries, held every three years in Paris. The exhibition is organised by C-MAT and EVOLIS, French professional trade unions for the equipment industry, together with Comexposium, a French trade show organiser.

== History ==
The exhibition was initially held at the Paris – Le Bourget Airport, and known as EXPOMAT. In 1988, it moved to the Parc des Expositions de Villepinte and was renamed INTERMAT.

Several manufacturers display their construction machinery and equipment in an outdoor demonstration area called INTERMAT Demo, where they can demonstrate machinery and equipment performance in simulated working conditions. The programme includes demonstrations of site machinery: backhoe loaders, mechanical diggers, mini-excavators, loaders and graders.

Construction equipment manufacturers who showcase their products at the exhibition include Caterpillar, Komatsu, Hitachi, Volvo, Liebherr, JCB, Bobcat Company, Haulotte Group, Case New Holland, John Deere, and Michelin.
