= Walsh Jesuit Ironman =

American amateur wrestling tournament

The Ironman Wrestling Tournament is an American high school folkstyle wrestling invitational tournament. The IRONMAN Wrestling Tournament is one of the most prestigious and competitive high school wrestling tournaments in the country. Held every December at Walsh Jesuit High School in Cuyahoga Falls, Ohio, the IRONMAN attracts the best wrestlers from all over the country and some of the top college coaches.

The tournament is divided into two divisions: the division for boys and the girls division. They each have 14 weight classes. Each weight class has a championship bracket and a consolation bracket. Both tournaments will be wrestled folkstyle. The IRONMAN is a three-day tournament.

The IRONMAN is a grueling tournament. Wrestlers often have to wrestle multiple matches in a day. The tournament is expected to draw over 600 wrestlers from over 150 schools each year.

It is widely considered one of the top three in-season high school wrestling tournaments in the United States, along with the Beast of the East and the Powerade Wrestling Tournament.
